= 2013–14 Pittsburgh Penguins season =

NHL team season

2013–14 Pittsburgh Penguins
- Metropolitan Division champions
- Division: 1st Metropolitan
- Conference: 2nd Eastern
- 2013–14 record: 51–24–7
- Home record: 28–9–4
- Road record: 23–15–3
- Goals for: 249
- Goals against: 207

Team information
- General manager: Ray Shero
- Coach: Dan Bylsma
- Captain: Sidney Crosby
- Alternate captains: Chris Kunitz; Evgeni Malkin; Brooks Orpik
- Arena: Consol Energy Center
- Average attendance: 18,618 (101.3%) (41 games)
- Minor league affiliates: WBS Penguins (AHL); Wheeling Nailers (ECHL)

Team leaders
- Goals: Sidney Crosby (36)
- Assists: Sidney Crosby (68)
- Points: Sidney Crosby (104)
- Penalty minutes: Tanner Glass (90)
- Plus/minus: Matt Niskanen (+33)
- Wins: Marc-Andre Fleury (39)
- Goals against average: Marc-Andre Fleury (2.37)

The 2013–14 Pittsburgh Penguins season was the 47th season for the National Hockey League (NHL) franchise that was established on June 5, 1967.

== Pre-season ==
=== Game log ===
The Penguins released their 2013 pre-season schedule on June 26, 2013.

2013 Pre-season game log: 3–2–1 (Home: 1–2–0; Road: 2–0–1)

#	Sept	Time (ET)	Visitor	Score	Home	Television	Record
1	15	6:00 pm	Pittsburgh Penguins	4–5 (OT)	Columbus Blue Jackets	ROOT	0–0–1
2	16	7:00 pm	Detroit Red Wings	4–1	Pittsburgh Penguins	WPCW	0–1–1
3	19	8:00 pm	Pittsburgh Penguins	4–3 (SO)	Chicago Blackhawks	ROOT	1–1–1
4	21	4:00 pm	Columbus Blue Jackets	5–3	Pittsburgh Penguins	ROOT	1–2–1
5	23	7:00 pm	Chicago Blackhawks	2–3 (SO)	Pittsburgh Penguins	WPCW	2–2–1
6	25	7:30 pm	Pittsburgh Penguins	5–1	Detroit Red Wings	ROOT	3–2–1

Legend: = Win = Loss = OT/SO Loss

=== Statistics ===
Updated as of September 25, 2013
Note – Statistics compiled from Official Game/Event Summaries from NHL.com

Preseason statistics

Skaters
Player	GP	G	A	Pts	+/−	PIM
Craig Adams	3	1	0	1	0	0
Beau Bennett	4	0	1	1	0	4
Robert Bortuzzo	4	0	1	1	−1	14
Chris Conner	1	0	1	1	0	0
Sidney Crosby	4	1	2	3	2	10
Matt D'Agostini	3	0	0	0	−2	2
Simon Despres	3	0	0	0	−1	2
Nick Drazenovic	1	0	0	0	0	0
Brian Dumoulin	1	0	1	1	1	0
Pascal Dupuis	4	1	0	1	−4	0
Andrew Ebbett	1	0	2	2	1	0
Deryk Engelland	3	0	1	1	−2	6
Bobby Farnham	1	0	0	0	0	0
Brian Gibbons	1	0	0	0	0	0
Tanner Glass	4	0	0	0	−1	2
Scott Harrington	1	0	0	0	−1	0
Dustin Jeffrey	5	1	2	3	−1	0
Jussi Jokinen	3	4	0	4	1	0
Chuck Kobasew	5	2	0	2	0	0
Tom Kuhnhackl	1	0	2	2	1	0
Chris Kunitz	4	2	3	5	0	2
Kris Letang	4	2	0	2	0	6
Pierre-Luc Letourneau-Leblond	1	0	0	0	−1	2
Olli Maatta	3	0	0	0	2	0
Steve MacIntyre	1	0	0	0	0	0
Evgeni Malkin	4	0	5	5	2	8
Paul Martin	2	0	2	2	−2	0
Jayson Megna	2	0	0	0	0	0
Brendan Mikkelson	1	0	0	0	−2	0
James Neal	4	1	3	4	1	4
Matt Niskanen	4	0	2	2	−1	0
Brooks Orpik	3	0	0	0	−3	0
Adam Payerl	2	0	0	0	0	5
Derrick Pouliot	2	1	0	1	−1	2
Philip Samuelsson	1	0	0	0	0	0
Rob Scuderi	4	0	1	1	4	0
Zach Sill	2	0	0	0	−2	0
Brandon Sutter	4	1	0	1	−3	2
Dominik Uher	1	0	0	0	0	2
Joe Vitale	3	1	0	1	−1	9
Harry Zolnierczyk	3	0	0	0	−1	4
Totals		18	29	47	−15	86

Goaltenders
Player	GP	GS	TOI	W	L	OT	GA	GAA	SA	SV%	SO	G	A	PIM
Marc-Andre Fleury	3	3	159:29	1	1	0	7	2.63	52	0.865	0	0	1	0
Eric Hartzell	1	0	20:00	0	0	0	0	0.00	14	1.000	0	0	0	0
Tomas Vokoun	2	2	104:45	1	1	0	7	4.01	48	0.854	0	0	0	0
Jeff Zatkoff	2	1	89:29	1	0	1	5	3.35	46	0.891	0	0	0	0
Totals		6	373:43	3	2	1	19	3.06	160	0.881	0	0	1	0

=== Injuries ===
Player	Injury	Date	Returned	Games missed
Tomas Vokoun	Blood clot in pelvis	September 21, 2013	–	3 games
Matt D'Agostini	Lower-body-injury	September 25, 2013	–	1 game
Total				4 games

== Regular season ==
=== Game log ===
2013–14 schedule
October: 9–4–0 (Home: 6–2–0; Road: 3–2–0), 18 Points

#	Oct	Time (ET)	Visitor	Score	Home	Location/Attendance	Record	Points
1	3	7:00 pm	New Jersey Devils	0–3	Pittsburgh Penguins	Consol Energy Center (18,621)	1–0–0	2
2	5	7:00 pm	Buffalo Sabres	1–4	Pittsburgh Penguins	Consol Energy Center (18,641)	2–0–0	4
3	8	7:00 pm	Carolina Hurricanes	2–5	Pittsburgh Penguins	Consol Energy Center (18,451)	3–0–0	6
4	11	7:30 pm	Pittsburgh Penguins	3–6	Florida Panthers	BB&T Center (18,584)	3–1–0	6
5	12	7:00 pm	Pittsburgh Penguins	5–4	Tampa Bay Lightning	Times Forum (18,939)	4–1–0	8
6	15	7:00 pm	Edmonton Oilers	2–3	Pittsburgh Penguins	Consol Energy Center (18,410)	5–1–0	10
7	17	7:00 pm	Pittsburgh Penguins	4–1	Philadelphia Flyers	Wells Fargo Center (19,735)	6–1–0	12
8	19	1:00 pm	Vancouver Canucks	3–4 SO	Pittsburgh Penguins	Consol Energy Center (18,657)	7–1–0	14
9	21	7:30 pm	Colorado Avalanche	1–0	Pittsburgh Penguins	Consol Energy Center (18,606)	7–2–0	14
10	25	7:00 pm	New York Islanders	4–3	Pittsburgh Penguins	Consol Energy Center (18,664)	7–3–0	14
11	26	7:00 pm	Pittsburgh Penguins	1–4	Toronto Maple Leafs	Air Canada Centre (19,539)	7–4–0	14
12	28	7:00 pm	Pittsburgh Penguins	3–1	Carolina Hurricanes	PNC Arena (15,042)	8–4–0	16
13	30	8:00 pm	Boston Bruins	2–3	Pittsburgh Penguins	Consol Energy Center (18,627)	9–4–0	18

November: 9–5–1 (Home: 5–1–0; Road: 4–4–1), 19 Points

#	Nov	Time (ET)	Visitor	Score	Home	Location/Attendance	Record	Points
14	1	7:00 pm	Columbus Blue Jackets	2–4	Pittsburgh Penguins	Consol Energy Center (18,620)	10–4–0	20
15	2	7:00 pm	Pittsburgh Penguins	3–0	Columbus Blue Jackets	Nationwide Arena (18,634)	11–4–0	22
16	6	7:30 pm	Pittsburgh Penguins	1–5	New York Rangers	Madison Square Garden (18,006)	11–5–0	22
17	9	8:00 pm	Pittsburgh Penguins	1–2	St. Louis Blues	Scottrade Center (18,685)	11–6–0	22
18	13	8:00 pm	Philadelphia Flyers	1–2	Pittsburgh Penguins	Consol Energy Center (18,656)	11–7–0	22
19	15	7:00 pm	Nashville Predators	1–4	Pittsburgh Penguins	Consol Energy Center (18,606)	12–7–0	24
20	16	7:00 pm	Pittsburgh Penguins	1–4	New Jersey Devils	Prudential Center (14,205)	12–8–0	24
21	18	7:30 pm	Anaheim Ducks	1–3	Pittsburgh Penguins	Consol Energy Center (18,604)	13–8–0	26
22	20	7:30 pm	Pittsburgh Penguins	4–0	Washington Capitals	Verizon Center (18,506)	14–8–0	28
23	22	7:00 pm	New York Islanders	3–4	Pittsburgh Penguins	Consol Energy Center (18,515)	15–8–0	30
24	23	7:00 pm	Pittsburgh Penguins	2–3	Montreal Canadiens	Bell Centre (21,273)	15–9–0	30
25	25	7:00 pm	Pittsburgh Penguins	3–4 OT	Boston Bruins	TD Garden (17,565)	15–9–1	31
26	27	7:30 pm	Toronto Maple Leafs	5–6 SO	Pittsburgh Penguins	Consol Energy Center (18,660)	16–9–1	33
27	29	4:00 pm	Pittsburgh Penguins	3–0	Tampa Bay Lightning	Times Forum (19,065)	17–9–1	35
28	30	7:00 pm	Pittsburgh Penguins	5–1	Florida Panthers	BB&T Center (17,583)	18–9–1	37

December: 11–3–0 (Home: 6–0–0; Road: 5–3–0), 22 Points

#	Dec	Time (ET)	Visitor	Score	Home	Location/Attendance	Record	Points
29	3	7:00 pm	Pittsburgh Penguins	3–2 OT	New York Islanders	Nassau Coliseum (13,915)	19–9–1	39
30	5	7:00 pm	San Jose Sharks	1–5	Pittsburgh Penguins	Consol Energy Center (18,522)	20–9–1	41
31	7	7:00 pm	Pittsburgh Penguins	2–3	Boston Bruins	TD Garden (17,565)	20–10–1	41
32	9	7:30 pm	Columbus Blue Jackets	1–2	Pittsburgh Penguins	Consol Energy Center (18,520)	21–10–1	43
33	13	7:00 pm	New Jersey Devils	2–3	Pittsburgh Penguins	Consol Energy Center (18,582)	22–10–1	45
34	14	7:00 pm	Pittsburgh Penguins	4–1	Detroit Red Wings	Joe Louis Arena (20,066)	23–10–1	47
35	16	7:00 pm	Toronto Maple Leafs	1–3	Pittsburgh Penguins	Consol Energy Center (18,573)	24–10–1	49
36	18	8:00 pm	Pittsburgh Penguins	4–3 SO	New York Rangers	Madison Square Garden (18,006)	25–10–1	51
37	19	7:00 pm	Minnesota Wild	2–5	Pittsburgh Penguins	Consol Energy Center (18,623)	26–10–1	53
38	21	1:00 pm	Calgary Flames	3–4	Pittsburgh Penguins	Consol Energy Center (18,663)	27–10–1	55
39	23	7:30 pm	Pittsburgh Penguins	0–5	Ottawa Senators	Canadian Tire Centre (19,838)	27–11–1	55
40	27	7:00 pm	Pittsburgh Penguins	4–3 OT	Carolina Hurricanes	PNC Arena (18,124)	28–11–1	57
41	29	6:00 pm	Pittsburgh Penguins	5–3	Columbus Blue Jackets	Nationwide Arena (18,871)	29–11–1	59
42	31	1:00 pm	Pittsburgh Penguins	1–2	New Jersey Devils	Prudential Center (16,592)	29–12–1	59

January: 9–2–1 (Home: 5–1–0; Road: 4–1–1), 19 Points

#	Jan	Time (ET)	Visitor	Score	Home	Location/Attendance	Record	Points
43	3	7:00 pm	New York Rangers	2–5	Pittsburgh Penguins	Consol Energy Center (18,668)	30–12–1	61
44	5	1:00 pm	Winnipeg Jets	5–6	Pittsburgh Penguins	Consol Energy Center (18,652)	31–12–1	63
45	7	10:00 pm	Pittsburgh Penguins	5–4 SO	Vancouver Canucks	Rogers Arena (18,910)	32–12–1	65
46	10	10:00 pm	Pittsburgh Penguins	3–4 OT	Edmonton Oilers	Rexall Place (16,839)	32–12–2	66
47	11	10:00 pm	Pittsburgh Penguins	2–1	Calgary Flames	Scotiabank Saddledome (19,289)	33–12–2	68
48	15	8:00 pm	Washington Capitals	3–4	Pittsburgh Penguins	Consol Energy Center (18,667)	34–12–2	70
49	20	7:00 pm	Florida Panthers	5–1	Pittsburgh Penguins	Consol Energy Center (18,660)	34–13–2	70
50	22	7:00 pm	Montreal Canadiens	1–5	Pittsburgh Penguins	Consol Energy Center (18,617)	35–13–2	72
51	23	7:30 pm	Pittsburgh Penguins	6–4	New York Islanders	Nassau Coliseum (15,012)	36–13–2	74
52	25	8:00 pm	Pittsburgh Penguins	0–3	Dallas Stars	American Airlines Center (18,532)	36–14–2	74
53	27	7:30 pm	Buffalo Sabres	0–3	Pittsburgh Penguins	Consol Energy Center (18,563)	37–14–2	76
54	30	10:30 pm	Pittsburgh Penguins	4–1	Los Angeles Kings	Staples Center (18,118)	38–14–2	78

February: 2–1–2 (Home: 1–0–2; Road: 1–1–0), 6 Points

#	Feb	Time (ET)	Visitor	Score	Home	Location/Attendance	Record	Points
55	1	8:00 pm	Pittsburgh Penguins	1–3	Phoenix Coyotes	Jobing.com Arena (17,362)	38–15–2	78
56	3	7:00 pm	Ottawa Senators	1–2 OT	Pittsburgh Penguins	Consol Energy Center (18,579)	39–15–2	80
57	5	7:30 pm	Pittsburgh Penguins	5–1	Buffalo Sabres	First Niagara Center (18,408)	40–15–2	82
58	7	7:00 pm	New York Rangers	4–3 SO	Pittsburgh Penguins	Consol Energy Center (18,661)	40–15–3	83
Olympic break (February 9–25)
59	27	7:00 pm	Montreal Canadiens	6–5 SO	Pittsburgh Penguins	Consol Energy Center (18,636)	40–15–4	84

March: 8–7–1 (Home: 4–4–0; Road: 4–3–1), 17 Points

#	Mar	Time (ET)	Visitor	Score	Home	Location/Attendance	Record	Points
60	1	8:00 pm	Pittsburgh Penguins	1–5	Chicago Blackhawks	Soldier Field (62,921)	40–16–4	84
61	4	8:00 pm	Pittsburgh Penguins	3–1	Nashville Predators	Bridgestone Arena (17,113)	41–16–4	86
62	6	10:30 pm	Pittsburgh Penguins	3–5	San Jose Sharks	SAP Center (17,562)	41–17–4	86
63	7	10:00 pm	Pittsburgh Penguins	3–2 SO	Anaheim Ducks	Honda Center (17,518)	42–17–4	88
64	10	7:00 pm	Pittsburgh Penguins	3–2	Washington Capitals	Verizon Center (18,506)	43–17–4	90
65	11	7:30 pm	Washington Capitals	0–2	Pittsburgh Penguins	Consol Energy Center (18,646)	44–17–4	92
66	15	1:00 pm	Pittsburgh Penguins	0–4	Philadelphia Flyers	Wells Fargo Center (19,993)	44–18–4	92
67	16	7:30 pm	Philadelphia Flyers	4–3	Pittsburgh Penguins	Consol Energy Center (18,647)	44–19–4	92
68	18	7:00 pm	Dallas Stars	1–5	Pittsburgh Penguins	Consol Energy Center (18,659)	45–19–4	94
69	20	7:30 pm	Pittsburgh Penguins	4–5 OT	Detroit Red Wings	Joe Louis Arena (20,066)	45–19–5	95
70	22	1:00 pm	Tampa Bay Lightning	3–4 OT	Pittsburgh Penguins	Consol Energy Center (18,668)	46–19–5	97
71	23	1:00 pm	St. Louis Blues	1–0	Pittsburgh Penguins	Consol Energy Center (18,662)	46–20–5	97
72	25	7:00 pm	Phoenix Coyotes	3–2	Pittsburgh Penguins	Consol Energy Center (18,632)	46–21–5	97
73	27	7:00 pm	Los Angeles Kings	3–2	Pittsburgh Penguins	Consol Energy Center (18,650)	46–22–5	97
74	28	7:00 pm	Pittsburgh Penguins	2–1	Columbus Blue Jackets	Nationwide Arena (18,908)	47–22–5	99
75	30	7:30 pm	Chicago Blackhawks	1–4	Pittsburgh Penguins	Consol Energy Center (18,655)	48–22–5	101

April: 3–2–2 (Home: 1–1–2; Road: 2–1–0), 8 Points

#	Apr	Time (ET)	Visitor	Score	Home	Location/Attendance	Record	Points
76	1	7:00 pm	Carolina Hurricanes	4–1	Pittsburgh Penguins	Consol Energy Center (18,635)	48–23–5	101
77	3	8:00 pm	Pittsburgh Penguins	4–2	Winnipeg Jets	MTS Centre (15,004)	49–23–5	103
78	5	8:00 pm	Pittsburgh Penguins	0–4	Minnesota Wild	Xcel Energy Center (19,409)	49–24–5	103
79	6	8:00 pm	Pittsburgh Penguins	3–2 SO	Colorado Avalanche	Pepsi Center (18,007)	50–24–5	105
80	9	8:00 pm	Detroit Red Wings	3–4 SO	Pittsburgh Penguins	Consol Energy Center (18,620)	51–24–5	107
81	12	3:00 pm	Philadelphia Flyers	4–3 OT	Pittsburgh Penguins	Consol Energy Center (18,673)	51–24–6	108
82	13	7:00 pm	Ottawa Senators	3–2 OT	Pittsburgh Penguins	Consol Energy Center (18,663)	51–24–7	109

Legend: = Win = Loss = OT/SO Loss

=== Season standings ===
Metropolitan Division
Pos	Team	GP	W	L	OTL	ROW	GF	GA	GD	Pts
1	y – Pittsburgh Penguins	82	51	24	7	44	249	207	+42	109
2	x – New York Rangers	82	45	31	6	41	218	193	+25	96
3	x – Philadelphia Flyers	82	42	30	10	39	236	235	+1	94
4	x – Columbus Blue Jackets	82	43	32	7	38	231	216	+15	93
5	Washington Capitals	82	38	30	14	28	235	240	−5	90
6	New Jersey Devils	82	35	29	18	35	197	208	−11	88
7	Carolina Hurricanes	82	36	35	11	34	207	230	−23	83
8	New York Islanders	82	34	37	11	25	225	267	−42	79

Source: National Hockey League
x – Clinched playoff spot; y – Clinched division

=== Detailed records ===
Final

Eastern Conference
Atlantic	GP	W	L	OT	SHOTS	GF	GA	PP	PK	FO W–L
Boston Bruins	3	1	1	1	92–68	8	9	3–10	1–6	75–94
Tampa Bay Lightning	3	3	0	0	84–63	12	7	7–14	3–10	98–83
Montreal Canadiens	3	1	1	1	94–82	12	10	5–13	2–11	85–105
Detroit Red Wings	3	2	0	1	92–96	12	9	5–13	1–13	86–72
Ottawa Senators	3	1	1	1	103–87	4	9	2–14	3–10	92–89
Toronto Maple Leafs	3	2	1	0	117–80	10	10	4–9	3–11	114–99
Florida Panthers	3	1	2	0	97–98	9	12	1–7	3–11	102–79
Buffalo Sabres	3	3	0	0	103–70	12	2	1–7	0–6	97–75
Division Total	24	14	6	4	782–644	79	68	28–87	16–78	749–696

Metropolitan	GP	W	L	OT	SHOTS	GF	GA	PP	PK	FO W–L
Pittsburgh Penguins										
New York Rangers	4	2	1	1	118–133	13	14	5–14	3–16	131–133
Philadelphia Flyers	5	1	3	1	150–142	11	15	1–21	6–15	131–165
Columbus Blue Jackets	5	5	0	0	145–155	16	7	5–19	1–14	140–140
Washington Capitals	4	4	0	0	131–111	13	5	2–11	1–11	115–93
New Jersey Devils	4	2	2	0	92–118	8	8	0–7	0–11	103–92
Carolina Hurricanes	4	3	1	0	123–117	13	10	2–8	2–9	136–113
New York Islanders	4	3	1	0	139–117	16	13	5–16	1–12	148–118
Division Total	30	20	8	2	898–893	90	72	20–96	14–88	904–854
Conference Total	54	34	14	6	1680–1537	169	140	48–183	30–166	1653–1550

Western Conference
Central	GP	W	L	OT	SHOTS	GF	GA	PP	PK	FO W–L
Colorado Avalanche	2	1	1	0	66–55	3	3	1–9	0–8	54–55
St. Louis Blues	2	0	2	0	53–59	1	3	1–7	0–5	56–61
Chicago Blackhawks	2	1	1	0	59–66	5	6	0–8	0–4	66–66
Minnesota Wild	2	1	1	0	56–46	5	6	1–6	0–7	47–69
Dallas Stars	2	1	1	0	56–61	5	4	0–7	2–6	60–58
Nashville Predators	2	2	0	0	52–37	7	2	2–9	0–6	60–52
Winnipeg Jets	2	2	0	0	60–49	10	7	2–5	0–6	51–51
Division Total	14	8	6	0	402–373	36	31	7–51	2–42	394–412

Pacific	GP	W	L	OT	SHOTS	GF	GA	PP	PK	FO W–L
Anaheim Ducks	2	2	0	0	44–59	6	3	1–6	0–4	60–48
San Jose Sharks	2	1	1	0	52–92	8	6	3–6	0–7	61–53
Los Angeles Kings	2	1	1	0	59–63	6	4	2–10	2–7	50–64
Phoenix Coyotes	2	0	2	0	49–59	3	6	1–3	1–9	59–61
Vancouver Canucks	2	2	0	0	63–65	9	7	1–6	0–3	61–58
Calgary Flames	2	2	0	0	49–58	6	4	0–6	1–9	55–47
Edmonton Oilers	2	1	0	1	56–53	6	6	2–7	2–7	52–58
Division Total	14	9	4	1	372–449	44	36	10–44	6–46	398–389
Conference Total	28	17	10	1	774–822	80	67	17–95	8–88	792–801
NHL Total	82	51	24	7	2454–2359	249	207	65–278	38–254	2445–2351

=== Injuries ===
Final

Player	Injury	Date	Returned	Games missed
Tomas Vokoun	Blood clot in pelvis	From pre-season	–	82 games
Matt D'Agostini	Lower-body-injury	From pre-season	October 26, 2013	10 games
Kris Letang	Lower-body-injury	September 27, 2013	October 25, 2013	9 games
James Neal	Upper-body-injury	October 4, 2013	November 9, 2013	15 games
Beau Bennett	Lower-body-injury	October 13, 2013	November 9, 2013	11 games
Rob Scuderi	Lower-body-injury (broken ankle)	October 27, 2013	December 29, 2013	29 games
Chuck Kobasew	Lower-body-injury	October 29, 2013	December 5, 2013	17 games
Paul Martin	Lower-body-injury	November 9, 2013	November 15, 2013	2 games
Beau Bennett	Upper-body-injury (wrist surgery)	November 23, 2013	March 22, 2014	46 games
Tanner Glass	Upper-body-injury (broken hand)	November 24, 2013	December 27, 2013	15 games
Paul Martin	Lower-body-injury (fractured tibia)	November 26, 2013	January 20, 2014	23 games
Evgeni Malkin	Lower-body-injury	December 5, 2013	December 9, 2013	2 games
Andrew Ebbett	Lower-body-injury (broken ankle)	December 6, 2013	January 25, 2014	21 games
Pascal Dupuis	Lower-body-injury	December 6, 2013	December 7, 2013	0 games
Brooks Orpik	Concussion	December 8, 2013	December 27, 2013	8 games
Kris Letang	Upper-body-injury (elbow infection)	December 14, 2013	January 5, 2014	10 games
Evgeni Malkin	Lower-body-injury	December 15, 2013	January 5, 2014	9 games
Jayson Megna	Lower-body-injury	December 17, 2013	January 20, 2014	13 games
Pascal Dupuis	Lower-body-injury (torn ACL)	December 24, 2013	–	42 games
Chris Conner	Upper-body-injury (hand)	January 2, 2014	–	39 games
Chuck Kobasew	Lower-body-injury	January 4, 2014	January 20, 2014	6 games
Joe Vitale	Upper-body-injury	January 10, 2014	February 27, 2014	12 games
Brian Gibbons	Lower-body-injury	January 11, 2014	January 27, 2014	5 games
James Neal	Upper-body-injury	January 15, 2014	January 20, 2014	1 game
Kris Letang	Illness (Stroke)	January 31, 2014	April 9, 2014	26 games
Taylor Pyatt	Lower-body-injury	February 3, 2014	February 27, 2014	2 games
Paul Martin	Upper-body-injury (broken hand)	February 25, 2014	April 3, 2014	18 games
Brian Gibbons	Lower-body-injury	March 7, 2014	March 11, 2014	2 games
Robert Bortuzzo	Upper-body-injury	March 7, 2014	March 11, 2014	2 games
James Neal	Concussion	March 14, 2014	March 18, 2014	2 games
Chris Kunitz	Lower-body-injury (Leg)	March 15, 2014	March 18, 2014	2 games
Joe Vitale	Upper-body-injury	March 21, 2014	–	13 games
Evgeni Malkin	Lower-body-injury (Foot)	March 25, 2014	–	11 games
Marcel Goc	Lower-body-injury (Ankle)	March 27, 2014	–	9 games
Olli Maatta	Upper-body-injury	April 5, 2014	April 9, 2014	2 games
Jussi Jokinen	Upper-body-injury	April 5, 2014	April 6, 2014	1 game
Chris Kunitz	Lower-body-injury	April 6, 2014	April 9, 2014	1 game
Sidney Crosby	Upper-body-injury	April 6, 2014	April 9, 2014	1 game
Brooks Orpik	Lower-body-injury	April 6, 2014	April 9, 2014	1 game
Chris Kunitz	Lower-body-injury	April 12, 2014	April 13, 2014	1 game
Brooks Orpik	Lower-body-injury	April 12, 2014	April 13, 2014	1 game
Taylor Pyatt	Undisclosed	April 12, 2014	April 13, 2014	1 game
Total				523 games

=== Suspensions/fines ===
Player	Explanation	Length	Salary	Date issued
James Neal	Kneeing Boston Bruins forward Brad Marchand during NHL Game No. 438 in Boston on Saturday, December 7, 2013, at 11:06 of the first period.	5 games	$128,205.15	December 9, 2013
Deryk Engelland	An illegal check to the head of Detroit Red Wings forward Justin Abdelkader during NHL Game No. 491 in Detroit on Saturday, December 14, 2013, at 19:30 of the first period.	5 games	$14,529.90	December 18, 2013
James Neal	Cross-checking Detroit Red Wings forward Luke Glendening in NHL Game No. 1046 in Detroit on Thursday, March 20, 2014, at 5:19 of the second period.	–	$5,000	March 21, 2014

== Playoffs ==
=== Game log ===
The Pittsburgh Penguins entered the playoffs as the Metropolitan Division's first seed. They defeated the Columbus Blue Jackets in the first round 4–2. After taking a 3–1 second round series lead following Game 4, they went on to lose the final three games as the New York Rangers defeated the Penguins in a 2–1 Game 7 decision.

2014 Stanley Cup Playoffs
Eastern Conference First Round vs. Columbus Blue Jackets: Pittsburgh won series 4–2

#	Date	Visitor	Score	Home	OT	Decision	Attendance	Series	Recap
1	April 16	Columbus	3–4	Pittsburgh		Fleury	18,646	1–0	Recap
2	April 19	Columbus	4–3	Pittsburgh	2OT	Fleury	18,619	1–1	Recap
3	April 21	Pittsburgh	4–3	Columbus		Fleury	19,148	2–1	Recap
4	April 23	Pittsburgh	3–4	Columbus	OT	Fleury	18,970	2–2	Recap
5	April 26	Columbus	1–3	Pittsburgh		Fleury	18,618	3–2	Recap
6	April 28	Pittsburgh	4–3	Columbus		Fleury	19,189	4–2	Recap

Eastern Conference Second Round vs. New York Rangers: New York won series 4–3

#	Date	Visitor	Score	Home	OT	Decision	Attendance	Series	Recap
1	May 2	New York	3–2	Pittsburgh	OT	Fleury	18,622	0–1	Recap
2	May 4	New York	0–3	Pittsburgh		Fleury	18,638	1–1	Recap
3	May 5	Pittsburgh	2–0	New York		Fleury	18,006	2–1	Recap
4	May 7	Pittsburgh	4–2	New York		Fleury	18,006	3–1	Recap
5	May 9	New York	5–1	Pittsburgh		Fleury	18,633	3–2	Recap
6	May 11	Pittsburgh	1–3	New York		Fleury	18,006	3–3	Recap
7	May 13	New York	2–1	Pittsburgh		Fleury	18,635	3–4	Recap

Legend: = If needed = Win = Loss = Playoff series win

=== Injuries ===
Final

Player	Injury	Date	Returned	Games missed
Evgeni Malkin	Lower-body-injury (Foot)	From season	April 16, 2014	0 games
Joe Vitale	Mid-body-injury	From season	April 16, 2014	0 games
Tomas Vokoun	Blood clot in pelvis	From pre-season		13 games
Pascal Dupuis	Lower-body-injury (torn ACL)	From season		13 games
Chris Conner	Upper-body-injury (hand)	From season		13 games
Marcel Goc	Lower-body-injury (Ankle)	From season	April 26, 2014	4 games
Brian Gibbons	Upper-body-injury	April 19, 2014	May 4, 2014	5 games
Brooks Orpik	Undisclosed injury	April 26, 2014	May 7, 2014	5 games
Brooks Orpik	Undisclosed injury	May 8, 2014		3 games
Total				56 games

== Post-season ==
=== Injuries ===
Player	Injury	Date	Recovery
Derrick Pouliot	Shoulder surgery	May 21, 2014	4–6 months
Olli Maatta	Shoulder surgery	May 22, 2014	4–6 months
Beau Bennett	Wrist surgery	May 22, 2014	4 months

== Player statistics ==
Skaters

Regular season
Player	GP	G	A	Pts	+/−	PIM
Sidney Crosby	80	36	68	104	18	46
Evgeni Malkin	60	23	49	72	10	62
Chris Kunitz	78	35	33	68	25	66
James Neal	59	27	34	61	15	55
Jussi Jokinen	81	21	36	57	12	18
Matt Niskanen	81	10	36	46	33	51
Olli Maatta	78	9	20	29	8	14
Brandon Sutter	81	13	13	26	-9	12
Kris Letang	37	11	11	22	-8	16
Pascal Dupuis	39	7	13	20	6	8
Brian Gibbons	41	5	12	17	5	6
Paul Martin	39	3	12	15	-4	10
Joe Vitale	53	1	13	14	-1	29
Tanner Glass	67	4	9	13	-8	90
Brooks Orpik	72	2	11	13	-3	46
Deryk Engelland	56	6	6	12	-6	58
Craig Adams	82	5	6	11	-16	46
Lee Stempniak^{†}	21	4	7	11	5	4
Robert Bortuzzo	54	0	10	10	-3	74
Jayson Megna	36	5	4	9	1	6
Beau Bennett	21	3	4	7	-2	0
Chris Conner	19	4	1	5	-3	2
Simon Despres	34	0	5	5	4	26
Taylor Pyatt^{†}	34	4	0	4	-15	10
Rob Scuderi	53	0	4	4	-8	2
Chuck Kobasew	33	2	0	2	1	15
Harry Zolnierczyk	13	2	0	2	0	12
Marcel Goc^{†}	12	0	2	2	0	4
Matt D'Agostini	8	0	1	1	-1	4
Andrew Ebbett	9	0	1	1	-4	0
Dustin Jeffrey	10	0	1	1	-2	2
Brian Dumoulin	6	0	1	1	1	4
Pierre-Luc Letourneau-Leblond	1	0	0	0	0	0
Nick Drazenovic	1	0	0	0	-1	2
Zach Sill	20	0	0	0	-4	12
Philip Samuelsson	5	0	0	0	-1	0
Adam Payerl	2	0	0	0	-1	2
Total		242	423	665	—	814

Playoffs
Player	GP	G	A	Pts	+/−	PIM
Evgeni Malkin	13	6	8	14	6	8
Jussi Jokinen	13	7	3	10	5	10
Matt Niskanen	13	2	7	9	-2	8
Sidney Crosby	13	1	8	9	-4	4
Chris Kunitz	13	3	5	8	-4	16
Paul Martin	13	0	8	8	7	6
Brandon Sutter	13	5	2	7	7	2
Kris Letang	13	2	4	6	2	14
Beau Bennett	12	1	4	5	-1	8
James Neal	13	2	2	4	2	24
Olli Maatta	13	0	4	4	2	0
Lee Stempniak	13	2	1	3	-4	6
Brian Gibbons	8	2	1	3	2	2
Craig Adams	13	1	1	2	2	2
Brooks Orpik	5	1	1	2	6	0
Marcel Goc	9	0	1	1	-1	4
Robert Bortuzzo	8	0	1	1	1	4
Rob Scuderi	13	0	0	0	-4	6
Tanner Glass	8	0	0	0	0	4
Joe Vitale	13	0	0	0	0	4
Jayson Megna	2	0	0	0	-1	0
Total		35	61	96	—	132

Goaltenders

Regular season
Player	GP	GS	TOI	W	L	OT	GA	GAA	SA	SV%	SO	G	A	PIM
Marc-Andre Fleury	64	64	3792:24	39	18	5	150	2.37	1774	0.915	5	0	0	4
Jeff Zatkoff	20	18	1171:22	12	6	2	51	2.61	582	0.912	1	0	1	0
Total		82	4963:46	51	24	7	201	2.43	2356	0.915	6	0	1	4

Playoffs
Player	GP	GS	TOI	W	L	OT	GA	GAA	SA	SV%	SO	G	A	PIM
Marc-Andre Fleury	13	13	799:40	7	6	--	32	2.40	378	0.915	2	0	0	0
Total		13	799:40	7	6	0	32	2.40	378	0.915	2	0	0	0

^{†}Denotes player spent time with another team before joining the Penguins. Stats reflect time with the Penguins only.
^{‡}Denotes player was traded mid-season. Stats reflect time with the Penguins only.

== Team statistics ==
Regular season
Summary
GP	W	L	OT	P	ROW	HROW	AROW
82	51	24	7	109	44	25	19

Goals by Period - Average Goals Per Game
SF	SA	SF/G	SA/G	GF 1st	GF 2nd	GF 3rd	GF OT
2,454	2,359	29.9	28.8	68	86	84	4

Special Teams
Powerplay
HPP	HPP%	APP	APP%	PP	PP%	SHGA
32/136	23.5%	33/142	23.2%	65/278	23.4%	6
Penalty Kill
HPK	HPK%	APK	APK%	PK	PK%	SHG
94/111	84.7%	122/143	85.3%	216/254	85%	4

Misc
Hits	BS	MS	GVA	TKA	FOW	FOL	FO%
2,162	1,187	865	609	306	2,445	2,351	51%

Playoffs
Summary
GP	W	L	OT	P	ROW	HROW	AROW
13	7	6	3	–	7	3	4

Goals by Period - Average Goals Per Game
SF	SA	SF/G	SA/G	GF 1st	GF 2nd	GF 3rd	GF OT
437	379	33.6	29.2	11	14	10	0

Special Teams
Powerplay
HPP	HPP%	APP	APP%	PP	PP%	SHGA
5/27	18.5%	2/22	9.1%	7/49	14.3%	3
Penalty Kill
HPK	HPK%	APK	APK%	PK	PK%	SHG
18/25	72%	25/28	89.3%	43/53	81.1%	3

Misc
Hits	BS	MS	GVA	TKA	FOW	FOL	FO%
348	183	161	118	72	427	390	52.3%

– Denotes league leader.

== Notable achievements ==
=== Awards ===
Regular season
Player	Award	Awarded
M. Fleury	NHL Third Star of the Week	October 7, 2013
S. Crosby	NHL Second Star of the Week	October 21, 2013
M. Fleury	NHL Second Star of the Week	November 4, 2013
E. Malkin	NHL First Star of the Week	November 25, 2013
E. Malkin	NHL First Star of the Week	December 2, 2013
S. Crosby	NHL Second Star of the Week	December 23, 2013
J. Neal	NHL Third Star of the Week	December 30, 2013
S. Crosby	NHL Second Star of December	January 3, 2014

Post Season
Player	Award	Awarded
S. Crosby	Hart Memorial Trophy	June 24, 2014
S. Crosby	Ted Lindsay Award	June 24, 2014
S. Crosby	Art Ross Trophy	June 24, 2014

=== Team awards ===
Awarded week of April 6

Player	Award	Notes
Matt Niskanen	Baz Bastien Memorial Award	Presented by the Pittsburgh Chapter of the Professional Hockey Writers Association to the player who the local media of the PHWA want to acknowledge for his cooperation throughout the year. The award is presented in memory of the late Aldege "Baz" Bastien, Penguins general manager from 1976 to 1983. Sponsor: UPMC
Kris Letang	Bill Masterton Memorial Trophy nominee	The Pittsburgh Chapter of the Professional Hockey Writers Association votes for the Penguins' Masterton nominee. Each NHL team selects a Masterton candidate from which the overall winner is chosen. The Masterton candidate is nominated as the player who best exemplifies the qualities of perseverance, sportsmanship and dedication to hockey. Sponsor: Trib Total Media
Sidney Crosby; Marc-Andre Fleury	A. T. Caggiano Memorial Booster Club Cup	Presented in memory of A.T. Caggiano, long-time Penguins' locker room attendant & Booster Club supporter, the award is presented by Penguins Booster Club members, who vote for the three stars after every home game and tally votes at the end of the regular season.
Olli Maatta	Rookie of the Year Award	Presented in memory of former Penguins forward Michel Briere to the player who makes a substantial contribution during his rookie season. Sponsor: Highmark
Brooks Orpik	Player's Player Award	The players hold a vote at the end of the season for the player they feel exemplifies leadership for the team, both on and off the ice, a player dedicated to teamwork. Sponsor: American Eagle Outfitters
Marc-Andre Fleury	Edward J. DeBartolo Award	The award recognizes the player who has donated a tremendous amount of time and effort during the season working on community and charity projects. Sponsor: Verizon Wireless
Matt Niskanen	Defensive Player of the Year	This award honors the defensive skills of an individual player on the team. Sponsor: PNC Wealth Management
Sidney Crosby	Most Valuable Player	Based on the overall contribution the player makes to the team. Sponsor: CONSOL Energy

=== Milestones ===
Regular season
Player	Milestone	Reached
C. Adams	800th Career NHL Game	October 3, 2013
P. Dupuis	200th Career NHL Assist	October 3, 2013
M. Fleury	250th Career NHL Win	October 3, 2013
O. Maatta	1st Career NHL Game	October 3, 2013
P. Dupuis	800th Career NHL Game	October 5, 2013
O. Maatta	1st Career NHL Assist; 1st Career NHL Point	October 8, 2013
J. Zatkoff	1st Career NHL Game	October 11, 2013
M. Niskanen	100th Career NHL Assist	October 12, 2013
O. Maatta	1st Career NHL Goal	October 19, 2013
J. Megna	1st Career NHL Game	October 25, 2013
J. Megna	1st Career NHL Goal; 1st Career NHL Assist; 1st Career NHL Point	October 28, 2013
J. Zatkoff	1st Career NHL Win; 1st Career NHL Shutout	November 2, 2013
D. Jeffrey	100th Career NHL Game	November 6, 2013
P. Martin	600th Career NHL Game	November 6, 2013
D. Engelland	200th Career NHL Game	November 15, 2013
C. Kunitz	600th Career NHL Game	November 15, 2013
Z. Sill	1st Career NHL Game	November 16, 2013
B. Gibbons	1st Career NHL Game; 1st Career NHL Goal; 1st Career NHL Assist; 1st Career NHL Point	November 18, 2013
J. Jokinen	600th Career NHL Game	November 18, 2013
M. Fleury	25th Career NHL Shutout	November 20, 2013
S. Crosby	250th Career NHL Goal	November 22, 2013
K. Letang	400th Career NHL Game	November 23, 2013
S. Crosby	700th Career NHL Point	November 29, 2013
S. Crosby	500th Career NHL Game	December 5, 2013
B. Dumoulin	1st Career NHL Game	December 14, 2013
E. Malkin	600th Career NHL Point	December 14, 2013
P. Samuelsson	1st Career NHL Game	December 16, 2013
B. Dumoulin	1st Career NHL Assist; 1st Career NHL Point	December 16, 2013
M. Fleury	500th Career NHL Game	December 27, 2013
R. Scuderi	600th Career NHL Game	January 5, 2014
E. Malkin	500th Career NHL Game	January 27, 2014
J. Neal	300th Career NHL Point	February 27, 2014
J. Jokinen	400th Career NHL Point	February 27, 2014
C. Kobasew	600th Career NHL Game	March 4, 2014
C. Kunitz	200th Career NHL Goal	March 4, 2014
J. Neal	400th Career NHL Game	March 20, 2014
B. Orpik	700th Career NHL Game	April 3, 2014
A. Payerl	1st Career NHL Game	April 6, 2014
A. Ebbett	200th Career NHL Game	April 6, 2014

Playoffs
Player	Milestone	Reached
B. Bennett	1st Career Playoff Assist	April 16, 2014
B. Gibbons	1st Career Playoff Game	April 16, 2014
O. Maata	1st Career Playoff Game; 1st Career Playoff Assist; 1st Career Playoff Point	April 16, 2014
C. Kunitz	100th Career Playoff Game	April 16, 2014
R. Scuderi	100th Career Playoff Game	April 16, 2014
B. Gibbons	1st Career Playoff Goal; 1st Career Playoff Point	April 19, 2014
J. Megna	1st Career Playoff Game	April 21, 2014
L. Stempniak	1st Career Playoff Goal	April 21, 2014
E. Malkin	100th Career Playoff Point	April 21, 2014
R. Bortuzzo	1st Career Playoff Game	April 26, 2014
E. Malkin	2nd Career Playoff Hat Trick	April 28, 2014
C. Adams	100th Career Playoff Game	May 2, 2014
M. Fleury	50th Career Playoff Win; Franchise Playoff Shutout Record	May 4, 2014
R. Bortuzzo	1st Career Playoff Assist; 1st Career Playoff Point	May 5, 2014

== Transactions ==
The Penguins have been involved in the following transactions during the 2013–14 season:

=== Trades ===
June 30, 2013	To San Jose Sharks rights to Tyler Kennedy	To Pittsburgh Penguins 2nd-round pick in 2013 (#50 – Dillon Heatherington)
June 30, 2013	To Columbus Blue Jackets SJS's 2nd-round pick in 2013 (#50 – Dillon Heatherington); 3rd-round pick in 2013 (#89 – Oliver Bjorkstrand)	To Pittsburgh Penguins 2nd-round pick in 2013 (#44 – Tristan Jarry)
February 6, 2014	To Columbus Blue Jackets Paul Thompson	To Pittsburgh Penguins Spencer Machacek
March 5, 2014	To Florida Panthers 5th-round pick in 2014 (#143–Miguel Fidler); 3rd-round pick in 2015 (#77–Samuel Montembeault)	To Pittsburgh Penguins Marcel Goc
March 5, 2014	To Calgary Flames 3rd-round pick in 2014 (to CHI–#83–Matheson Iacopelli)	To Pittsburgh Penguins Lee Stempniak

=== Free agents ===
Player	Acquired from	Lost to	Date	Contract terms
Riley Holzapfel		HV71	July 4, 2013	2 years
Rob Scuderi	Los Angeles Kings		July 5, 2013	4 years/$13.5 million
Andrew Ebbett	Vancouver Canucks		July 5, 2013	1 year/$550,000^{[a]}
Chris Conner	Phoenix Coyotes		July 5, 2013	1 year/$550,000^{[a]}
Nick Drazenovic	Columbus Blue Jackets		July 5, 2013	1 year/$550,000^{[a]}
Bobby Farnham	Wilkes-Barre/Scranton Penguins		July 5, 2013	1 year/$550,000^{[a]}
Matt Cooke		Minnesota Wild	July 5, 2013	3 years/$7.5 million
Jarome Iginla		Boston Bruins	July 5, 2013	1 year/$6 million
Trevor Smith		Toronto Maple Leafs	July 5, 2013	1 year/$550,000
Matt D'Agostini	New Jersey Devils		July 10, 2013	1 year/$550,000
Brad Thiessen		HIFK	July 15, 2013	1 year
Brendan Mikkelson	Tampa Bay Lightning		July 19, 2013	1 year/$550,000^{[a]}
Douglas Murray		Montreal Canadiens	August 22, 2013	1 year/$1.5 million
Keven Veilleux		Phoenix Coyotes	September 10, 2013	Tryout Contract
Chuck Kobasew	Colorado Avalanche		September 11, 2013	Tryout Contract
Brenden Morrow		St. Louis Blues	September 23, 2013	1 year/$1.5 million
Pierre-Luc Letourneau-Leblond	Wilkes-Barre/Scranton Penguins		November 7, 2013	2 years/$1.1 million^{[a]}

=== Waivers ===
Player	Claimed from	Lost to	Date
Steve MacIntyre		Edmonton Oilers	September 23, 2013
Dustin Jeffrey		Dallas Stars	November 17, 2013
Matt D'Agostini		Buffalo Sabres	November 27, 2013
Taylor Pyatt	New York Rangers		January 2, 2014

=== Signings ===
Player	Date	Contract terms
Kris Letang	July 2, 2013	8 years/$58 million (contract extension)
Pascal Dupuis	July 2, 2013	4 years/$15 million
Craig Adams	July 5, 2013	2 years/$1.4 million
Zach Sill	July 9, 2013	1 year/$550,000^{[a]}
Paul Thompson	July 9, 2013	1 year/$550,000^{[a]}
Harry Zolnierczyk	July 12, 2013	1 year/$550,000^{[a]}
Dustin Jeffrey	July 18, 2013	1 year/$625,000
Eric Hartzell	July 20, 2013	2 years/$1.1 million^{[a]}
Robert Bortuzzo	July 24, 2013	2 years/$1.2 million
Brian Gibbons	July 29, 2013	1 year/$550,000^{[a]}
Matt Murray	September 4, 2013	3 years/$1.9525 million^{[b]}
Tristan Jarry	September 4, 2013	3 years/$1.9525 million^{[b]}
Jean-Sebastien Dea	September 17, 2013	3 years/$1.795 million^{[b]}
Chuck Kobasew	October 2, 2013	1 year/$550,000
Matia Marcantuoni	October 19, 2013	3 years/$1.900 million^{[b]}
Jeff Zatkoff	December 21, 2013	2 years/$1.2 million (contract extension)
Bryan Rust	April 1, 2014	2 years/$1.305 million^{[b]}
Scott Wilson	April 2, 2014	2 years/$1.310 million^{[b]}
Josh Archibald	May 16, 2014	3 years/$2.775 million^{[b]}
Oskar Sundqvist	May 31, 2014	3 years/$2.775 million^{[b]}

=== Other ===
Name	Date	Details
Jacques Martin	August 9, 2013	Hired as assistant coach
Mike Bales	August 19, 2013	Promoted to goaltending coach
Mike Buckley	September 4, 2013	Hired as goalie development coach
Ray Shero	May 16, 2014	Relieved of duties as general manager
Jason Botterill	May 16, 2014	Named as interim general manager
Jim Rutherford	June 6, 2014	Named as general manager
Jason Botterill	June 6, 2014	Promoted to Associate general manager
Tom Fitzgerald	June 6, 2014	Promoted to Assistant general manager
Bill Guerin	June 6, 2014	Promoted to Assistant general manager
Dan Bylsma	June 6, 2014	Relieved of duties as Head Coach
Jason Karmanos	June 12, 2014	Named as Vice President of Hockey Operations
Mike Johnston	June 25, 2014	Named as Head Coach
Rick Tocchet	June 25, 2014	Named as Assistant Coach
Tony Granato	June 25, 2014	Relieved of duties of Assistant Coach
Todd Reirden	June 25, 2014	Relieved of duties of Assistant Coach

Notes

- ^{a} – Two-way contract
- ^{b} – Entry-level contract

== Draft picks ==
Pittsburgh Penguins' picks at the 2013 NHL entry draft, which was held in Newark, New Jersey on June 30, 2013.

Round	#	Player	Pos	Nationality	College/Junior/Club team (League)
2	44^{[a]}	Tristan Jarry	Goalie	Canada	Edmonton Oil Kings (WHL)
3	77^{[b]}	Jake Guentzel	Center	United States	Sioux City Musketeers (USHL)
4	119	Ryan Segalla	Defence	United States	Salisbury School (USHS-CT)
6	164^{[c]}	Dane Birks	Defence	Canada	Merritt Centennials (BCHL)
6	179	Blaine Byron	Center	Canada	Smiths Falls Bears (CCHL)
7	209	Troy Josephs	Left wing	Canada	St. Michael's Buzzers (OJHL)

Draft notes

- The Pittsburgh Penguins' first-round pick went to the Calgary Flames as the result of a March 28, 2013 trade that sent Jarome Iginla to the Penguins in exchange for the rights to Kenny Agostino, Ben Hanowski and this pick.
- The Pittsburgh Penguins' second-round pick went to the San Jose Sharks as the result of a March 25, 2013 trade that sent Douglas Murray to the Penguins in exchange for a 2014 second-round pick and this pick.
- ^{a} The Columbus Blue Jackets second-round pick went to the Pittsburgh Penguins as a result of a June 30, 2013 trade that sent a 2013 second-round pick (#50–from San Jose) and a 2013 third-round pick (#89) to the Blue Jackets in exchange for this pick.
- ^{b} The Minnesota Wild's third-round pick went to the Pittsburgh Penguins (via Philadelphia and Dallas) as a result of a March 24, 2013 trade that sent Joe Morrow and a 2013 fifth-round pick to the Stars in exchange for Brenden Morrow and this pick.
- The Pittsburgh Penguins' fifth-round pick went to the Dallas Stars as the result of a March 24, 2013 trade that sent Brenden Morrow and a 2013 third-round pick to the Penguins in exchange for a Joe Morrow and this pick.
- ^{c} The Winnipeg Jets' sixth-round pick went to the Pittsburgh Penguins as a result of a February 13, 2013 trade that sent Eric Tangradi to the Jets in exchange for this pick.
