= 2013–14 Wilkes-Barre/Scranton Penguins season =

2013–14 Wilkes-Barre/Scranton Penguins
- Division: 2nd East Division
- Conference: 6th Eastern Conference
- 2013–14 record: 42–26–3–5 (92 pts)
- Home record: 21–16–2–1
- Road record: 21–10–1–4
- Goals for: 206
- Goals against: 185

Team information
- General manager: Ray Shero
- Coach: John Hynes
- Assistant coach: Alain Nasreddine
- Captain: Tom Kostopoulos
- Arena: Mohegan Sun Arena at Casey Plaza

Team leaders
- Goals: Tom Kostopoulos (22)
- Assists: Brendan Mikkelson (30)
- Points: Tom Kostopoulos (47)
- Penalty minutes: Pierre-Luc Letourneau-Leblond (259)
- Plus/minus: (+) Simon Despres (+19) (−) Paul Thompson (−8)
- Wins: Jeff Deslauriers (20)
- Goals against average: Peter Mannino (1.56)

The 2013–14 Wilkes-Barre/Scranton Penguins season is the franchise's 15th season in the American Hockey League, which began on October 5, 2013. The team saw several roster changes from the previous season, including the loss of its top three scorers.

== Off-season ==
The Wilkes-Barre/Scranton Penguins saw roster changes during the 2013 off-season, including the loss of the previous year's top scorers Chad Kolarik, Trevor Smith and Riley Holzapfel. Other off-season departures included Alex Grant, Derek Nesbitt, Joey Mormina, Warren Peters, and Brad Thiessen. The Penguins signed several new players, including forwards Mike Carman, Chris Conner, Nick Drazenovic, Andrew Ebbett, Pierre-Luc Létourneau-Leblond, Denver Manderson, Christiaan Minella, and Harry Zolnierczyk; defensemen Brendan Mikkelson, Scott Harrington, Olli Maatta, Peter Merth, Dustin Stevenson, Harrison Ruopp, Nick D'Agostino and Clark Seymour; and goaltenders Peter Mannino, and Eric Hartzell. Also returning this season is Derrick Pouliot, the 19-year-old defenseman who played in a single Penguins playoff the previous year. The team also re-signed forwards Zach Sill, Paul Thompson, and Brian Gibbons. Out of 17 players from the 2012–13 roster with experience in more than 200 professional games, only Tom Kostopoulos and Sill remained this season. Kostopoulos was named the team's new captain.

A Wilkes-Barre/Scranton Penguins Hall of Fame was created to celebrate the team's 15th season, with the inaugural inductions to be two players and a builder who will be voted on by fans, media and personnel. Effective this season, Mike O'Brien became the Penguins' play-by-play announcer, replacing long-time broadcaster Tom Grace. Teddy Richards, who had been the WBS Penguins equipment manager for 11 years, was promoted to the Pittsburgh Penguins staff. Over the summer, WBS Penguins head coach John Hynes ran the on-ice portion of the Pittsburgh Penguins organization's development camp, and later coached the Penguins' prospects in a rookie tournament that started in London, Ontario. They were ultimately eliminated from the tournament by a 3–2 loss against the Chicago Blackhawks' rookies.

Before the preseason began, Wilkes-Barre/Scranton's starting goaltender Jeff Zatkoff temporarily became the Pittsburgh Penguins back-up goalie due to Tomas Vokoun suffering an injury. Following a training camp began on September 21 at Ice Rink at Coal Street Park, the Penguins played four preseason games: two against the Rochester Americans on September 25 and 27, and two against the Hershey Bears on September 28 and 29. Both Rochester match-ups were decided in overtime, with the Penguins losing the first one 3–2, and winning the second 2–1. Cody Sylvester's game-winner was initially waved off by the referee, but upon further review was deemed a good goal. The Penguins also split their preseason series against Hershey. They lost 6–1 in the first game, with Adam Payerl scoring their only goal, but won the second game 2–1, with Samuelsson scoring the game-winner. Manderson and Minella were loaned to ECHL's Wheeling Nailers after the preseason games concluded.

2013–14 Preseason Game Log: 2–1–1–0 (Home: 2–1–0–0; Road: 0–0–1–0)

#	Date	Visitor	Score	Home	OT	Decision	Record
1	September 25	WB/Scranton	2–3	Rochester	OT	Chiodo	0–0–1–0
2	September 27	Rochester	1–2	WB/Scranton	OT	Hartzell	1–0–1–0
3	September 28	Hershey	6–1	WB/Scranton		Chiodo	1–1–1–0
4	September 29	Hershey	1–2	WB/Scranton		Gill	2–1–1–0

== Regular season ==
=== October ===
Wilkes-Barre/Scranton won their first six games of the season, marking their best start since winning nine straight games in 2010–11. They scored a league-leading 27 goals in the season's first six games, compared to 15 goals in that time the previous season, and they showed particular strength in the third period, where they outscored their opponents 15–4 across the six games. They won their season opener 5–2 against the Bridgeport Sound Tigers on October 5, breaking the tie with two goals 11 seconds apart in the third period. Chris Conner scored two goals, including the game-winner. Wilkes-Barre/Scranton also won their home opener on October 12, defeating the Hershey Bears 3–1 after scoring two goals in the final three minutes. The Penguins defeated the Syracuse Crunch 6–3 the next day, coming back from a 2–1 deficit by scoring five goals in the third period. Kostopoulos scored two power play goals in the game.

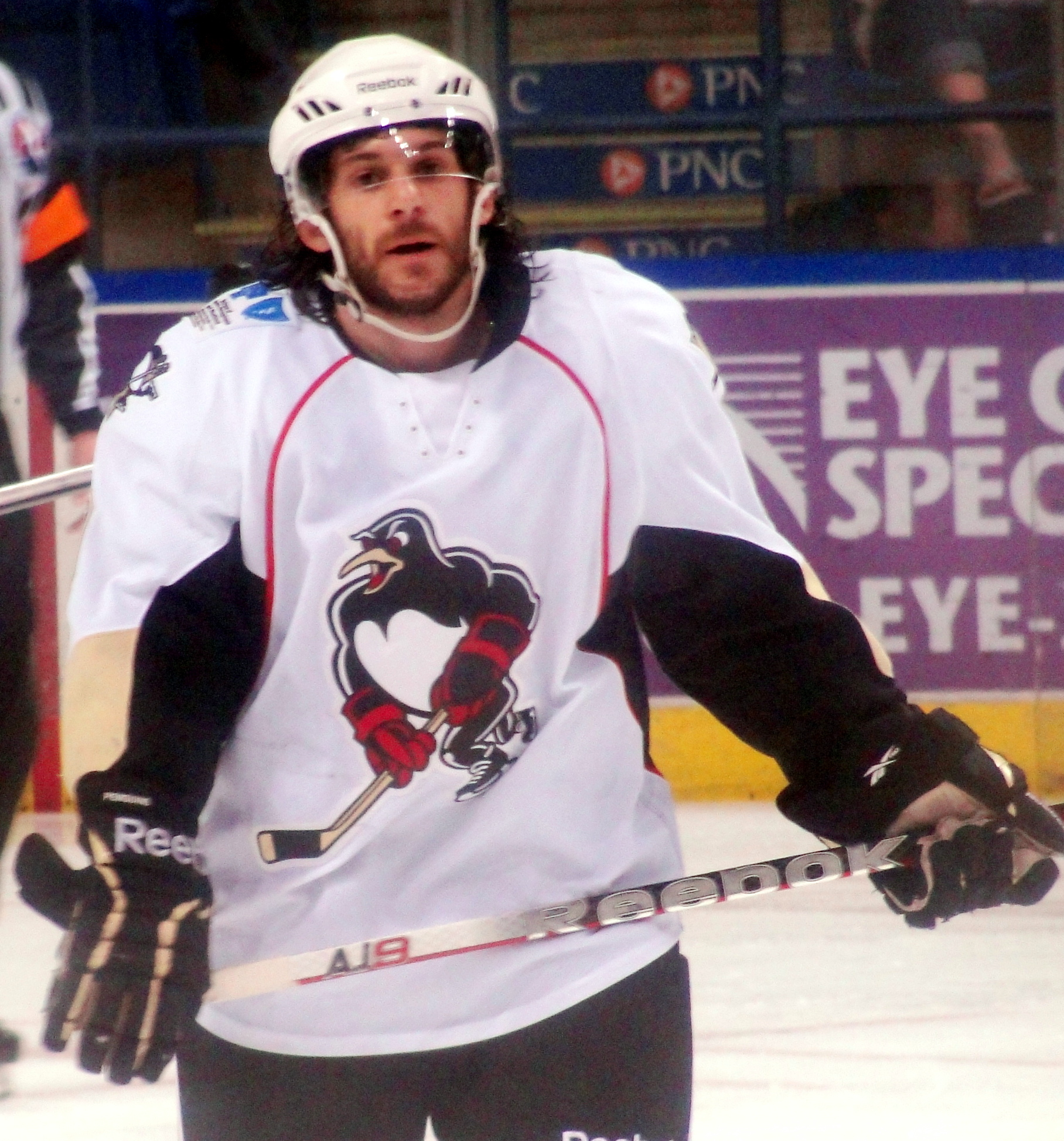
Brian Gibbons scored five goals for the Penguins in October, becoming the second-leading scorer in the league.

Zolnierczyk and Conner, each of whom had three goals in the first three games of the season, were called up to the Pittsburgh Penguins shortly afterward. Wilkes-Barre/Scranton next won three games in as many days from October 18 to 20, including a 3–2 comeback victory over the Worcester Sharks on October 19 in which they scored three goals in the third period, two of which came from Tom Kühnhackl. They also defeated the Manchester Monarchs 4–3 the next day when Mikkelson scored within 22 seconds of the overtime period. Gibbons had two goals and two assists, marking his fourth multi-point game in six games. Forward Jayson Megna was recalled to the Pittsburgh Penguins on October 24, while Conner and Zolnierczyk were sent back down.

Wilkes-Barre/Scranton suffered their first loss of the season on October 25, falling 4–3 to the Binghamton Senators. The Penguins rallied from a 3–1 deficit in the third period to tie the game, bringing their third period rate of outscoring opponents to 17–4, but nevertheless lost in the shootout. Gibbons scored his fifth goal of the season and 14th point, making him the second-leading scorer in the league. The game marked the seventh consecutive game with the Penguins scoring at least three goals, but also the first in which they allowed a power play goal in the first period. Wilkes-Barre/Scranton saw their first regulation loss on October 26 in a 2–1 decision against the Norfolk Admirals. In contrast to their previously strong third periods, the Penguins gave up the tie-breaking goal, took three penalties and failed to capitalize on two power plays. Goalie Eric Hartzell, who had not played a game all season due to an injury, was assigned to ECHL's Wheeling Nailers on October 31.

=== November ===
Wilkes-Barre/Scranton won two consecutive games against the Hershey Bears on November 1 and 2, the first time having done so since 2005. The Penguins won the first 3–2 in overtime after Mikkelson scored a power play goal with 25 seconds left in the extra period. Deslauriers also stopped a penalty shot from winger Matt Watkins in overtime. The game marked the third time in four games that the Penguins won after trailing the first two periods. The Penguins won the second Hershey game 4–2, coming back from an early 2–0 deficit after scoring on three of 22 shots in the second period.

== Schedule and results ==
2013–14 Regular season
October: 6–1–0–1 (Home: 4–1–0–0; Road: 2–0–0–1)

#	Oct	Time (ET)	Visitor	Score	Home	OT	Decision	Attendance	Record	Points
1	5	7:00 PM	WB/Scranton	5–2	Bridgeport		Deslauriers	7,886	1–0–0–0	2
2	12	7:05 PM	Hershey	1–3	WB/Scranton		Deslauriers	7,156	2–0–0–0	4
3	13	5:00 PM	WB/Scranton	6–3	Syracuse		Deslauriers	4,049	3–0–0–0	6
4	18	7:05 PM	Adirondack	3–6	WB/Scranton		Deslauriers	4,414	4–0–0–0	8
5	19	7:00 PM	WB/Scranton	3–2	Worcester		Mannino	5,476	5–0–0–0	10
6	20	3:00 PM	WB/Scranton	4–3	Manchester	OT	Deslauriers	3,186	6–0–0–0	12
7	25	7:05 PM	WB/Scranton	3–4	Binghamton	SO	Deslauriers	2,860	6–0–0–1	13
8	26	7:05 PM	Norfolk	2–1	WB/Scranton		Mannino	5,205	6–1–0–1	13

November: 7–4–2–0 (Home: 4–2–1–0; Road: 3–2–1–0)

#	Nov	Time (ET)	Visitor	Score	Home	OT	Decision	Attendance	Record	Points
9	1	7:05 PM	Hershey	2–3	WB/Scranton	OT	Deslauriers	5,019	7–1–0–1	15
10	2	7:00 PM	WB/Scranton	4–2	Hershey		Deslauriers	8,563	8–1–0–1	17
11	6	7:05 PM	Syracuse	4–3	WB/Scranton	OT	Deslauriers	4,934	8–1–1–1	18
12	8	7:05 PM	Albany	6–5	WB/Scranton		Deslauriers	5,821	8–2–1–1	18
13	10	3:00 PM	WB/Scranton	3–4	Springfield		Deslauriers	3,825	8–3–1–1	18
14	15	7:00 PM	WB/Scranton	5–3	Syracuse		Deslauriers	5,112	9–3–1–1	20
15	16	7:05 PM	Hershey	1–3	WB/Scranton		Deslauriers	6,008	10–3–1–1	22
16	20	7:05 PM	WB/Scranton	3–1	Rochester		Deslauriers	2,860	11–3–1–1	24
17	22	7:05 PM	St. John's	2–1	WB/Scranton		Deslauriers	4,136	11–4–1–1	24
18	23	7:05 PM	St. John's	2–5	WB/Scranton		Hartzell	5,102	12–4–1–1	26
19	27	7:00 PM	WB/Scranton	1–3	Adirondack		Deslauriers	3,431	12–5–1–1	26
20	29	7:05 PM	Binghamton	0–1	WB/Scranton		Hartzell	5,235	13–5–1–1	28
21	30	7:00 PM	WB/Scranton	2–3	Hershey	OT	Deslauriers	10,081	13–5–1–2	29

December: 5–4–0–1 (Home: 4–3–0–0; Road: 1–1–0–1)

#	Dec	Time (ET)	Visitor	Score	Home	OT	Decision	Attendance	Record	Points
22	6	7:30 PM	WB/Scranton	0–5	St. John's		Hartzell	6,287	13–6–1–2	29
23	7	7:30 PM	WB/Scranton	3–0	St. John's		Deslauriers	6,287	14–6–1–2	31
24	11	7:05 PM	Springfield	3–2	WB/Scranton		Deslauriers	4,190	14–7–1–2	31
25	13	7:05 PM	Hershey	3–5	WB/Scranton		Hartzell	5,947	15–7–1–2	33
26	14	7:05 PM	Utica	0–1	WB/Scranton		Hartzell	6,492	16–7–1–2	35
27	20	7:05 PM	Worcester	4–1	WB/Scranton		Hartzell	4,121	16–8–1–2	35
28	21	7:05 PM	Syracuse	1–2	WB/Scranton		Deslauriers	6,118	17–8–1–2	37
29	27	7:05 PM	Norfolk	3–1	WB/Scranton		Deslauriers	5,832	17–9–1–2	37
30	28	7:00 PM	WB/Scranton	1–2	Hershey	SO	Hartzell	10,708	17–9–1–3	38
31	31	5:05 PM	Syracuse	2–5	WB/Scranton		Deslauriers	4,581	18–9–1–3	40

January: 8–6–0–0 (Home: 3–3–0–0; Road: 4–3–0–0)

#	Jan	Time (ET)	Visitor	Score	Home	OT	Decision	Attendance	Record	Points
32	3	7:00 PM	WB/Scranton	2–1	Hartford		Deslauriers	3,049	19–9–1–3	42
33	4	7:05 PM	Manchester	4–2	WB/Scranton		Deslauriers	7,422	19–10–1–3	42
34	5	4:05 PM	Binghamton	1–4	WB/Scranton		Hartzell	4,162	20–10–1–3	44
35	8	7:05 PM	Syracuse	4–2	WB/Scranton		Deslauriers	3844	20–11–1–3	44
36	10	7:00 PM	WB/Scranton	4–1	Adirondack		Deslauriers	3,802	21–11–1–3	46
37	11	7:05 PM	Hartford	3–5	WB/Scranton		Deslauriers	8,188	22–11–1–3	48
38	17	7:05 PM	WB/Scranton	1–5	Providence		Deslauriers	9,090	22–12–1–3	48
39	18	7:00 PM	WB/Scranton	4–2	Portland		Hartzell	2,961	23–12–1–3	50
40	19	3:05 PM	WB/Scranton	5–1	Providence		Hartzell	7,705	24–12–1–3	52
41	24	7:30 PM	WB/Scranton	1–4	Norfolk		Deslauriers	5,930	24–13–1–3	52
42	25	7:15 PM	WB/Scranton	2–1	Norfolk	SO	Hartzell	6,310	25–13–1–3	54
43	26	5:00 PM	WB/Scranton	0–2	Hershey		Hartzell	9,485	25–14–1–3	54
44	29	7:05 PM	Syracuse	0–4	WB/Scranton		Hartzell	4,574	26–14–1–3	56
45	31	7:05 PM	Norfolk	2–1	WB/Scranton		Hartzell	5,117	26–15–1–3	56

February: 3–5–2–1 (Home: 3–2–1–1; Road: 0–3–1–0)

#	Feb	Time (ET)	Visitor	Score	Home	OT	Decision	Attendance	Record	Points
46	1	7:05 PM	Rochester	4–0	WB/Scranton		Hartzell	6,902	26–16–1–3	56
47	7	7:05 PM	Portland	1–5	WB/Scranton		Hartzell	4,264	27–16–1–3	58
48	8	7:05 PM	Adirondack	2–3	WB/Scranton		Deslauriers	6,348	28–16–1–3	60
49	9	5:00 PM	WB/Scranton	3–4	Hershey	OT	Hartzell	9,827	28–16–2–3	61
50	14	7:05 PM	WB/Scranton	2–6	Binghamton		Hartzell	3,650	28–17–2–3	61
51	15	7:00 PM	WB/Scranton	4–5	Hershey		Deslauriers	5,896	28–18–2–3	61
52	16	4:05 PM	Hershey	3–1	WB/Scranton		Deslauriers	5,896	28–19–2–3	61
53	19	7:05 PM	Binghamton	4–3	WB/Scranton	OT	Deslauriers	3,815	28–19–3–3	62
54	22	7:05 PM	Providence	3–4	WB/Scranton	SO	Deslauriers	8,183	28–19–3–4	63
55	25	7:05 PM	Hershey	5–6	WB/Scranton		Deslauriers	4,391	29–19–3–4	65
56	28	7:00 PM	WB/Scranton	0–4	Syracuse		Deslauriers	5,045	29–20–3–4	65

March: 9–2–0–1 (Home: 2–2–0–0; Road: 7–0–0–1)

#	March	Time (ET)	Visitor	Score	Home	OT	Decision	Attendance	Record	Points
57	1*	5:00 PM	WB/Scranton	2–1	Albany		Mannino	3,019	30–20–3–4	67
58	7	7:00 PM	WB/Scranton	1–2	Utica	SO	Mannino	3,815	30–20–3–5	68
59	8	7:00 PM	WB/Scranton	4–2	Hamilton		Mannino	4,744	31–20–3–5	70
60	9	3:00 PM	WB/Scranton	4–3	Toronto	SO	Deslauriers	5,394	32–20–3–5	72
61	14	7:05 PM	Hamilton	1–5	WB/Scranton		Mannino	5,778	33–20–3–5	74
62	15	7:05 PM	Norfolk	0–4	WB/Scranton		Mannino	7,715	34–20–3–5	76
63	21	7:00 PM	WB/Scranton	2–0	Syracuse		Mannino	5,076	35–20–3–5	78
64	22	7:05 PM	Utica	2–1	WB/Scranton		Mannino	8,163	35–21–3–5	78
65	23*	4:00 PM	WB/Scranton	3–2	Albany	OT	Deslauriers	3,431	36–21–3–5	80
66	26	7:05 PM	Providence	2–1	WB/Scranton		Mannino	5,970	36–22–3–5	80
67	28	7:30 PM	WB/Scranton	2–1	Norfolk		Mannino	5,130	37–22–3–5	82
68	29	7:15 PM	WB/Scranton	2–1	Norfolk		Mannino	6,039	38–22–3–5	84
* Game to be played in Atlantic City, New Jersey

April: 4–4–0–0 (Home: 1–3–0–0; Road: 3–1–0–0)

#	April	Time (ET)	Visitor	Score	Home	OT	Decision	Attendance	Record	Points
69	4	7:05 PM	WB/Scranton	3–0	Bridgeport		Mannino	6,993	39–22–3–5	86
70	5	7:05 PM	WB/Scranton	1–0	Albany	OT	Mannino	7,905	40–22–3–5	88
71	6	3:05 PM	Binghamton	6–2	WB/Scranton		Hartzell	3,335	40–23–3–5	88
72	11	7:00 PM	Syracuse	2–3	WB/Scranton	SO	Vokoun	4,789	41–23–3–5	90
73	12	7:05 PM	WB/Scranton	2–1	Binghamton		Mannino	8,096	42–23–3–5	92
74	13	4:05 PM	WB/Scranton	2–3	Toronto		Vokoun	6,519	42–24–3–5	92
75	18	7:05 PM	Binghamton	5–4	WB/Scranton		Mannino	3,674	42–25–3–5	92
76	19	7:00 PM	Utica	2–0	WB/Scranton		Murray	3,815	42–26–3–5	92

Legend: = Win = Loss = OT/SO Loss

== Playoffs ==
=== Game log ===
The Wilkes-Barre Scranton Penguins entered the Calder Cup playoffs as the 6th seed in the Eastern Conference. They began the playoffs playing the Binghamton Senators where they went on to win the series in 4 games. In the Eastern Conference Semifinals they had a rematch from last season against the Providence Bruins. The series ended in a thrilling Game 7 where the Penguins claimed an early 5–0 lead in the 2nd period and the Bruins scored a shorthanded goal late in the period. They would add 3 more goals in the 3rd to come within one of tying, but the Penguins were able to hold on and advance to the Eastern Conference Finals for the second straight season.

They faced the St. John's IceCaps in the Eastern Conference Finals where they fell behind 3–1 after game 4. They were able to force a game 6 where they eventually lost 5–0 and the IceCaps won the Richard F. Canning Trophy.

2014 Calder Cup Playoffs
Eastern Conference Quarterfinals vs. Binghamton Senators: Wilkes-Barre/Scranton won series 3–1

#	Date	Visitor	Score	Home	OT	Decision	Attendance	Series	Recap
1	April 16	Wilkes-Barre/Scranton	3–2	Binghamton	OT	Mannino	3,016	1–0	Recap
2	April 19	Wilkes-Barre/Scranton	3–4	Binghamton	OT	Mannino	3,306	1–1	Recap
3	April 21	Binghamton	2–3	Wilkes-Barre/Scranton	OT	Mannino	6,237	2–1	Recap
4	April 23	Binghamton	1–5	Wilkes-Barre/Scranton		Mannino	6,991	3–1	Recap

Eastern Conference Semifinals vs. Providence Bruins: Wilkes-Barre/Scranton won series 4–3

#	Date	Visitor	Score	Home	OT	Decision	Attendance	Series	Recap
1	May 2	Providence	4–0	Wilkes-Barre/Scranton		Mannino	3,170	0–1	Recap
2	May 4	Providence	1–6	Wilkes-Barre/Scranton		Mannino	3,488	1–1	Recap
3	May 5	Wilkes-Barre/Scranton	5–4	Providence	2OT	Mannino	2,045	2–1	Recap
4	May 7	Wilkes-Barre/Scranton	2–3	Providence	OT	Mannino	3,188	2–2	Recap
5	May 9	Wilkes-Barre/Scranton	3–2	Providence		Mannino	2,729	3–2	Recap
6	May 11	Providence	4–1	Wilkes-Barre/Scranton		Mannino	3,563	3–3	Recap
7	May 13	Providence	4–5	Wilkes-Barre/Scranton		Mannino	3,613	4–3	Recap

Eastern Conference Final vs. St. John's IceCaps: St. John's won series 4–2

#	Date	Visitor	Score	Home	OT	Decision	Attendance	Series	Recap
1	May 24	Wilkes-Barre/Scranton	3–2	St. John's		Mannino	6,287	1–0	Recap
2	May 25	Wilkes-Barre/Scranton	1–2	St. John's		Mannino	6,287	1–1	Recap
3	May 28	St. John's	5–0	Wilkes-Barre/Scranton		Mannino	3,553	1–2	Recap
4	May 29	St. John's	2–1	Wilkes-Barre/Scranton		Mannino	3,382	1–3	Recap
5	May 31	St. John's	2–4	Wilkes-Barre/Scranton		Mannino	4,660	2–3	Recap
6	June 3	Wilkes-Barre/Scranton	0–5	St. John's		Mannino	6,287	2–4	Recap

Legend: = If needed = Win = Loss = Playoff series win

== Player statistics ==
Final Stats

Skaters

Regular season
Player	GP	G	A	Pts	+/−	PIM
Tom Kostopoulos	71	22	25	47	4	72
Nick Drazenovic	63	13	29	42	3	28
Andrew Ebbett	44	13	27	40	10	28
Brendan Mikkelson	73	8	30	38	10	62
Harry Zolnierczyk	57	18	18	36	9	75
Spencer Machacek^{†}	56	19	14	33	11	39
Brian Gibbons	28	11	19	30	9	43
Dominik Uher	68	7	17	24	9	66
Scott Harrington*	76	5	19	24	9	55
Simon Despres	36	6	16	22	19	39
Philip Samuelsson	64	3	19	22	17	66
Brian Dumoulin	53	5	16	21	2	21
Anton Zlobin*	46	8	11	19	15	16
Jayson Megna	25	9	6	15	13	4
Bobby Farnham	64	7	7	14	−2	166
Mike Carman	63	6	8	14	2	34
Chuck Kobasew	12	11	2	13	7	20
Chris Conner	17	6	5	11	1	8
Adam Payerl	43	5	6	11	0	39
Denver Manderson*	36	2	9	11	1	4
Tom Kuhnhackl*	48	8	2	10	−4	22
Nick D'Agostino	48	1	9	10	−4	15
Paul Thompson^{‡}	39	4	3	7	−8	50
Zack Torquato*	18	2	5	7	1	22
Barry Goers	23	1	6	7	1	10
Zach Sill	18	3	3	6	3	34
Pierre-Luc Letourneau-Leblond	66	2	4	6	−7	259
Reid McNeill	55	1	4	5	9	119
Carter Rowney*	24	2	2	4	−2	6
Cody Sylvester	17	2	0	2	−4	18
Josh Archibald	7	1	0	1	0	13
Beau Bennett	3	0	1	1	0	0
Jean-Sebastien Dea	1	0	0	0	0	0
Matia Marcantuoni	1	0	0	0	0	2
Scott Wilson	1	0	0	0	0	2
Peter Merth	2	0	0	0	1	7
Bryan Rust	2	0	0	0	0	0
Conor Sheary	2	0	0	0	0	0
C. J. Severyn	4	0	0	0	−3	4
Dustin Stevenson	7	0	0	0	−1	7
Harrison Ruopp*	21	0	0	0	−5	34
Total		206	334	536	122	1509

Playoffs
Player	GP	G	A	Pts	+/-	PIM
Chuck Kobasew	14	8	6	14	9	40
Brian Dumoulin	17	3	9	12	5	22
Conor Sheary	15	6	5	11	4	0
Anton Zlobin	15	6	4	10	3	4
Tom Kostopoulos	17	4	6	10	0	20
Harry Zolnierczyk	17	3	7	10	−1	10
Simon Despres	17	2	7	9	5	32
Andrew Ebbett	6	2	6	8	4	14
Brendan Mikkelson	17	1	5	6	−1	22
Spencer Machacek	13	1	4	5	−5	18
Nick Drazenovic	9	1	3	4	0	2
Brian Gibbons	10	1	2	3	2	18
Reid McNeill	10	1	2	3	2	14
Jayson Megna	13	1	2	3	−2	4
Zach Sill	17	1	2	3	−2	18
Mike Carman	7	1	1	2	2	4
Adam Payerl	13	1	1	2	1	10
Carter Rowney	7	0	2	2	−4	2
Barry Goers	16	0	2	2	−1	2
Josh Archibald	2	1	0	1	−1	0
Dominik Uher	12	1	0	1	−1	4
Philip Samuelsson	8	0	1	1	−2	8
Scott Harrington	16	0	1	1	−2	12
Harrison Ruopp	1	0	0	0	−1	2
Bryan Rust	1	0	0	0	0	0
Tom Kuhnhackl	2	0	0	0	0	2
Pierre-Luc Letourneau-Leblond	2	0	0	0	0	12
Bobby Farnham	12	0	0	0	−3	30
Total		45	78	123	11	334

=== Goaltenders ===
Regular season
Player	GP	TOI	W	L	OT	GA	GAA	SA	SV%	SO	G	A	PIM
Peter Mannino	18	1035:31	11	4	1	27	1.56	372	0.932	0	0	0	2
Matt Murray	1	60:00	0	1	0	2	2.00	23	0.920	0	0	0	0
Tomas Vokoun	2	124:34	1	1	0	5	2.41	41	0.891	0	0	0	0
Eric Hartzell*	25	1233:45	10	8	1	51	2.48	467	0.902	3	0	1	2
Jeff Deslauriers	40	2139:58	20	15	3	92	2.58	783	0.895	1	0	1	19
Totals		4618:31	42	29	5	180	2.34	1686	0.904	8	0	2	23

Playoffs
Player	GP	TOI	W	L	GA	GAA	SV	SA	SV%	SO	G	A	PIM
Peter Mannino	17	1050:09	9	8	47	2.69	421	468	.900	0	0	0	0
Matt Murray	1	20:00	0	0	0	0.00	8	8	1.000	0	0	0	0
Totals		1080:22	9	8	49	2.72	429	476	.897	0	0	0	0

^{†}Denotes player spent time with another team before joining team. Stats reflect time with the team only.
^{‡}Left the team mid-season
^{*}Rookie

== Milestones ==
Regular season
Player	Milestone	Reached
John Hynes	150th AHL Win	October 20, 2013
