= Nick Drazenovic =

Canadian ice hockey player (born 1987)

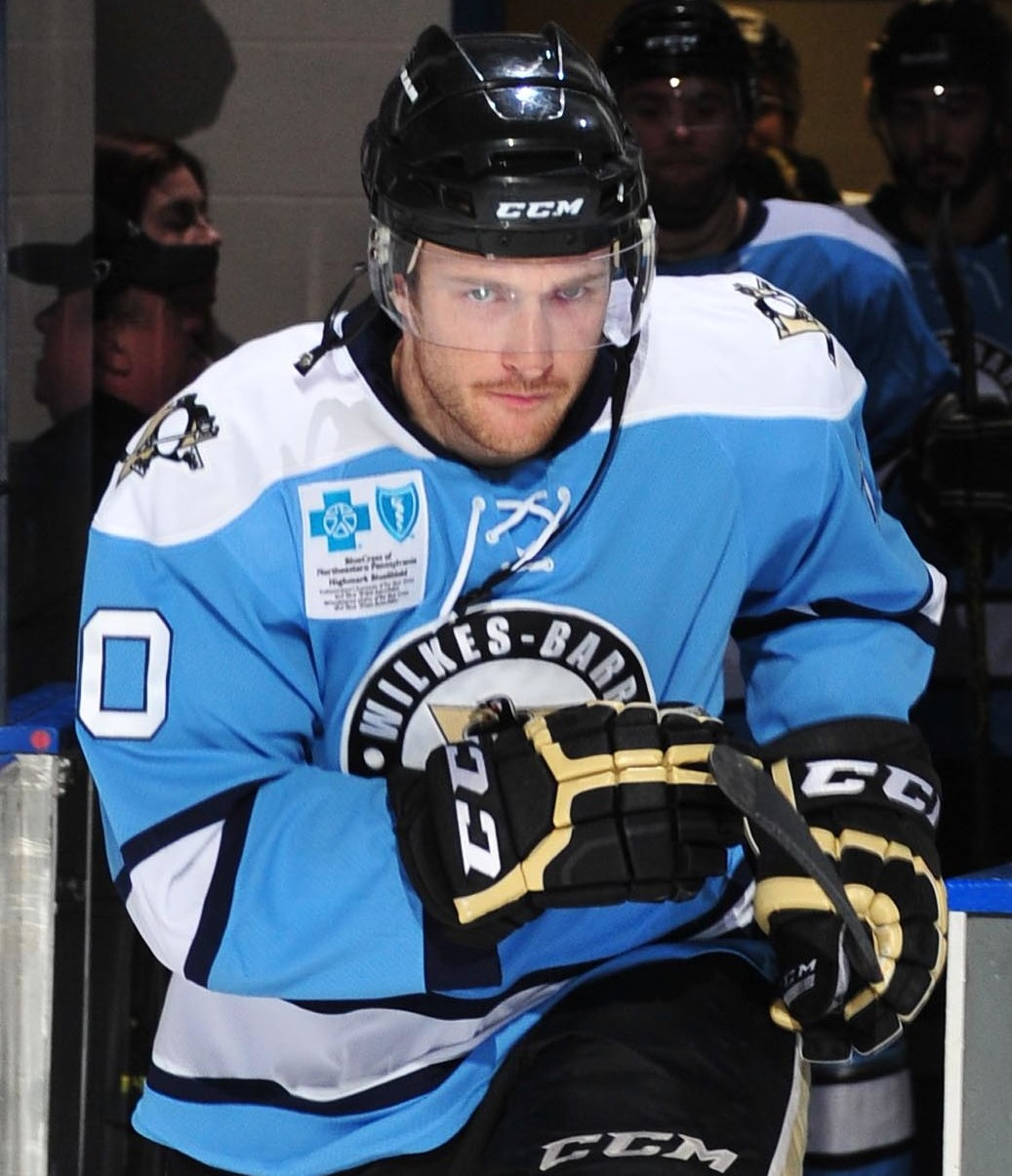
- Drazenovic with the Wilkes-Barre/Scranton Penguins in 2014
- Born: January 14, 1987 (age 39) Prince George, British Columbia, Canada
- Height: 6 ft 0 in (183 cm)
- Weight: 205 lb (93 kg; 14 st 9 lb)
- Position: Centre
- Shot: Left
- Played for: St. Louis Blues; Columbus Blue Jackets; Pittsburgh Penguins
- NHL draft: 171st overall, 2005; St. Louis Blues
- Playing career: 2007–2016

Nicholas Drazenovic (born January 14, 1987) is a Canadian former professional ice hockey centre of Croatian ancestry. He most recently played with the San Antonio Rampage of the American Hockey League (AHL). Drazenovic was selected by the St. Louis Blues in the 6th round (171st overall) of the 2005 NHL entry draft.

== Playing career ==
During the 2010–11 season, in November the Blues recalled Drazenovic from the AHL affiliate, the Peoria Rivermen. He played in three NHL games before being returned to Peoria for the remainder of the year.

On July 7, 2011, after he was not tendered an offer by the Blues, Drazenovic signed a one-year contract with the Columbus Blue Jackets. He was assigned to play with affiliate the Springfield Falcons for the start of the 2011–12 season.

On July 5, 2013, Drazenovic signed a one-year, two-way contract with the Pittsburgh Penguins that will pay him $550,000 at the NHL level. He was assigned to begin the 2013–14 season in the AHL with affiliate, the Wilkes-Barre/Scranton Penguins. On January 14, 2014, Drazenovic was recalled and played a solitary game with Pittsburgh in a 4-3 victory over the Washington Capitals the following day. He was promptly returned to the AHL, where he finished the season with 13 goals and 42 points in 63 games.

Drazenovic was re-signed by the Penguins to a one-year deal on July 1, 2014. Hampered by injury, Drazenovic was unable to improve upon his previous season with the Penguins, featuring in only 25 games for the 2014–15 season in Wilkes-Barre, however was still able to contribute offensively with 19 points.

As an un-signed free agent over the summer, Drazenovic belatedly returned to professional hockey in the 2015–16 season, signing a professional try-out contract in the AHL with the San Antonio Rampage on December 21, 2015. He made his debut with the Rampage that day in a 2-1 victory over the Iowa Wild. After a month with the depleted Rampage, Drazenovic secured an AHL contract as he was signed for the remainder of the campaign on January 26, 2015.

== Career statistics ==
=== Regular season and playoffs ===
			Regular season					Playoffs
Season	Team	League	GP	G	A	Pts	PIM	GP	G	A	Pts	PIM
2002–03	Prince George Cougars	WHL	15	4	4	8	0	—	—	—	—	—
2003–04	Prince George Cougars	WHL	65	7	30	37	38	—	—	—	—	—
2004–05	Prince George Cougars	WHL	72	18	38	56	24	—	—	—	—	—
2005–06	Prince George Cougars	WHL	71	30	33	63	51	5	0	0	0	4
2006–07	Prince George Cougars	WHL	58	18	32	50	63	15	9	10	19	6
2007–08	Peoria Rivermen	AHL	69	16	26	42	38	—	—	—	—	—
2008–09	Peoria Rivermen	AHL	76	12	21	33	43	5	1	0	1	2
2009–10	Peoria Rivermen	AHL	58	19	20	39	40	—	—	—	—	—
2010–11	Peoria Rivermen	AHL	75	23	23	46	24	4	0	1	1	2
2010–11	St. Louis Blues	NHL	3	0	0	0	0	—	—	—	—	—
2011–12	Springfield Falcons	AHL	41	13	28	41	16	—	—	—	—	—
2012–13	Springfield Falcons	AHL	62	17	36	53	30	8	2	2	4	2
2012–13	Columbus Blue Jackets	NHL	8	0	0	0	4	—	—	—	—	—
2013–14	Wilkes–Barre/Scranton Penguins	AHL	63	13	29	42	28	9	1	3	4	2
2013–14	Pittsburgh Penguins	NHL	1	0	0	0	2	—	—	—	—	—
2014–15	Wilkes–Barre/Scranton Penguins	AHL	25	8	11	19	18	3	0	1	1	0
2015–16	San Antonio Rampage	AHL	35	2	8	10	12	—	—	—	—	—
AHL totals			504	123	202	325	249	29	4	7	11	8
NHL totals			12	0	0	0	6	—	—	—	—	—

Medal record

Men's ice hockey

Representing (Canada)

World U-17 Hockey Challenge
Silver medal – second place	2004 Newfoundland and Labrador	

=== International ===
Year	Team	Event	Result	GP	G	A	Pts	PIM
2004	Canada Pacific	U17	2nd place, silver medalist(s)	6	1	4	5	4
Junior totals				6	1	4	5	4
