= Jayson Megna =

American ice hockey player (born 1990)

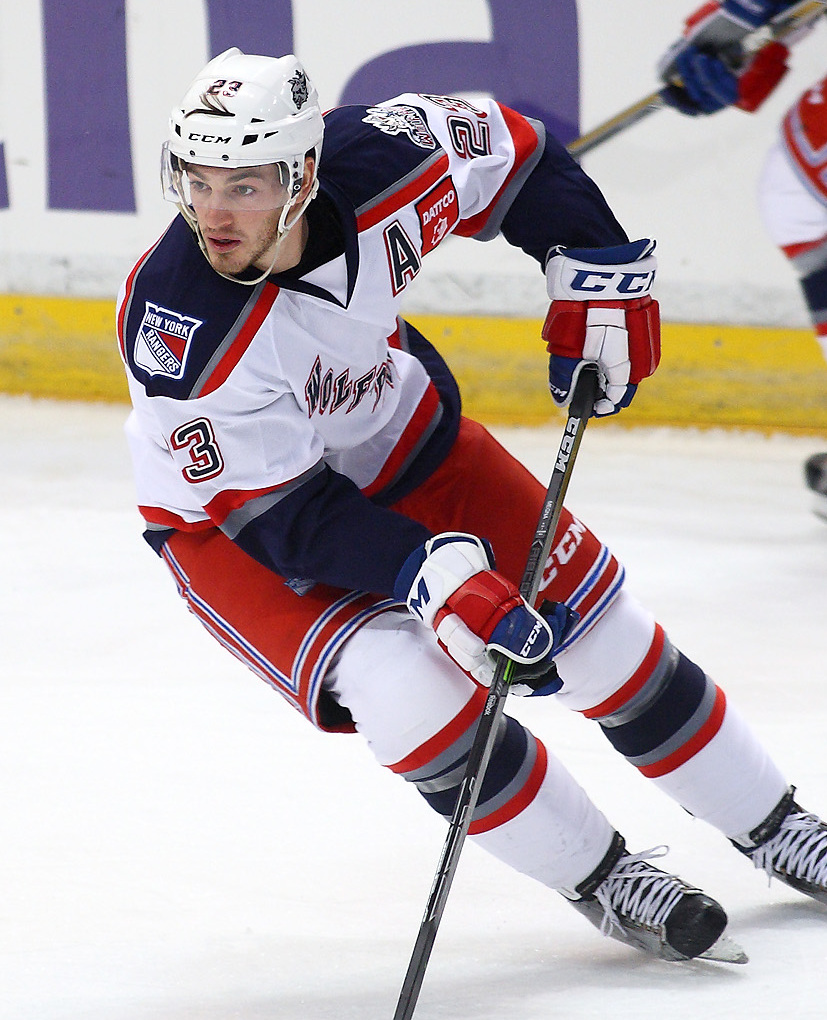
- Megna with the Hartford Wolf Pack in 2016
- Born: February 1, 1990 (age 36) Fort Lauderdale, Florida, U.S.
- Height: 6 ft 1 in (185 cm)
- Weight: 195 lb (88 kg; 13 st 13 lb)
- Position: Center
- Shoots: Right
- AHL team Former teams: Colorado Eagles; Pittsburgh Penguins; New York Rangers; Vancouver Canucks; Colorado Avalanche; Anaheim Ducks; Boston Bruins
- NHL draft: Undrafted
- Playing career: 2012–present

Jayson Megna (born February 1, 1990) is an American professional ice hockey forward who is currently the captain of the Colorado Eagles of the American Hockey League (AHL). Megna was born in Fort Lauderdale, Florida, but grew up in Northbrook, Illinois where he started to play hockey at the age of 7.

== Playing career ==
=== Amateur ===
As a youth, Megna played in the 2003 Quebec International Pee-Wee Hockey Tournament with the Chicago Young Americans minor ice hockey team.

He played high school hockey at Glenbrook North High School and Tabor Academy. He graduated in 2009 and then went to the USHL where he played two seasons with the Cedar Rapids Roughriders. After two seasons with Cedar Rapids, Jayson went to University of Nebraska at Omaha where he played on the same team as his brother Jaycob Megna. While there, Jayson was named to the WCHA All-Rookie Team.

=== Professional ===
==== Pittsburgh Penguins ====
Following his freshman year Jayson attended the Pittsburgh Penguins development camp and on August 1, 2012 he signed a two-way contract with an annual value of $925,000. In the 2013–14 season, on October 24, 2013, Jayson was recalled from the Wilkes-Barre/Scranton Penguins (AHL). He made his NHL debut versus the New York Islanders on October 25, 2013. He scored his first NHL point, an assist, and also his first NHL goal against the Carolina Hurricanes on October 28, 2013.

==== New York Rangers ====
On July 1, 2015, Megna left the Penguins organization as a free agent and signed a one-year, two-way contract with the New York Rangers. He began the 2015–16 season with the Rangers' AHL affiliate the Hartford Wolfpack, and was promoted to the Rangers on November 30, 2015. Megna returned to the Wolfpack on January 22, 2016 for a brief stint. He was later recalled by the Rangers on April 20, 2016, from the team's AHL affiliate, the Hartford Wolf Pack.

==== Vancouver Canucks ====
With his contract with the Rangers completed, Megna secured a one-year, one-way deal as a free agent with the Vancouver Canucks on July 1, 2016. He was reassigned to the Canucks' AHL affiliate, the Utica Comets to start the season but was recalled to the Canucks on October 24, 2016. On December 8, 2016 he scored two goals to help the Canucks defeat the Tampa Bay Lightning by a score of 5–1 for his first career multi-goal game.

On April 2, 2017, Megna signed a one-year extension with the Canucks for the 2017–18 season.

==== Washington Capitals ====
On July 1, 2018, Megna signed as a free agent to a one-year, two-way contract with the Washington Capitals for the 2018–19 season. Playing with the Capitals AHL affiliate, the Hershey Bears, Megna was used in a top six forward role to produce 20 goals and 43 points in 71 games during the regular season and added 8 points in 9 postseason outings.

==== Colorado Avalanche ====
As a free agent from the Capitals, Megna agreed to one-year, two-way $700,000 contract with his fifth NHL club, the Colorado Avalanche on July 1, 2019. After attending his first Avalanche training camp, Megna was amongst the last cuts re-assigned to begin the 2019–20 season with AHL affiliate, the Colorado Eagles. Collecting 4 points through his first 8 games, Megna was recalled to the NHL and made his Avalanche debut in a 4-3 overtime defeat against the Florida Panthers on October 30, 2019. Megna made 8 appearances throughout the season going scoreless, returning to the AHL he notched 18 goals and 34 points in 43 regular season games before the season was halted due to the COVID-19 pandemic.

On October 11, 2020, Megna was re-signed to a one-year, two-way extension with the Avalanche. In the pandemic delayed 2021–22 season, Megna appeared with both the Eagles and Avalanche, primarily assigned as a part of the Avalanche's taxi squad. He recorded his first points with the Avalanche, notching two assists in two consecutive games against the Los Angeles Kings on May 12, 13. He remained on the Avalanche's extended roster throughout the post-season, despite not featuring.

Megna continued his tenure with the Avalanche on June 16, 2021, agreeing to a two-year, two-way contract extension.

==== Anaheim Ducks ====
In the final year of his contract, Megna was re-assigned to the AHL to resume his role as captain of the Eagles to open the 2022–23 season. After two games with the Eagles, he was recalled by the injury depleted Avalanche to assume fourth-line center duties. Megna went scoreless through 14 games with the Avalanche before he was placed on waivers and claimed the following day by the Anaheim Ducks on December 6, 2022. Megna remained on the Ducks roster for the duration of the season and made his most NHL appearances since 2017, in finishing with 2 goals and 8 points in a combined 55 games.

==== Boston Bruins ====
As a free agent from the Ducks, Megna was signed to a one-year, two-way contract with the Boston Bruins for the 2023–24 season on July 1, 2023. Towards the end of a successful year with the Providence Bruins having recorded 19 goals and 37 assists through 69 appearances, Megna was rewarded for his efforts with a recall to the NHL club on April 16, 2024. He made his Bruins debut later that day against the Ottawa Senators, in the final game of the regular season.

==== Return to Colorado ====
At the conclusion of his contract with the Bruins, Megna left as a free agent and opted to return to Colorado in signing a two-year AHL contract with the Eagles on July 9, 2024. He was restored as team captain of the Eagles in advance of the 2024–25 season, his fifth year with the club.

== Personal life ==
Megna's younger brother Jaycob (born December 10, 1992) is also a professional hockey player, playing with the Henderson Silver Knights. His father, Jay, was a defensive back for the Miami Dolphins and the New Orleans Saints in the 1980s.

He is married to Taylor Craig, daughter of 1980 U.S. Olympic goaltender, Jim Craig; the couple welcomed their first daughter in 2021.

== Career statistics ==
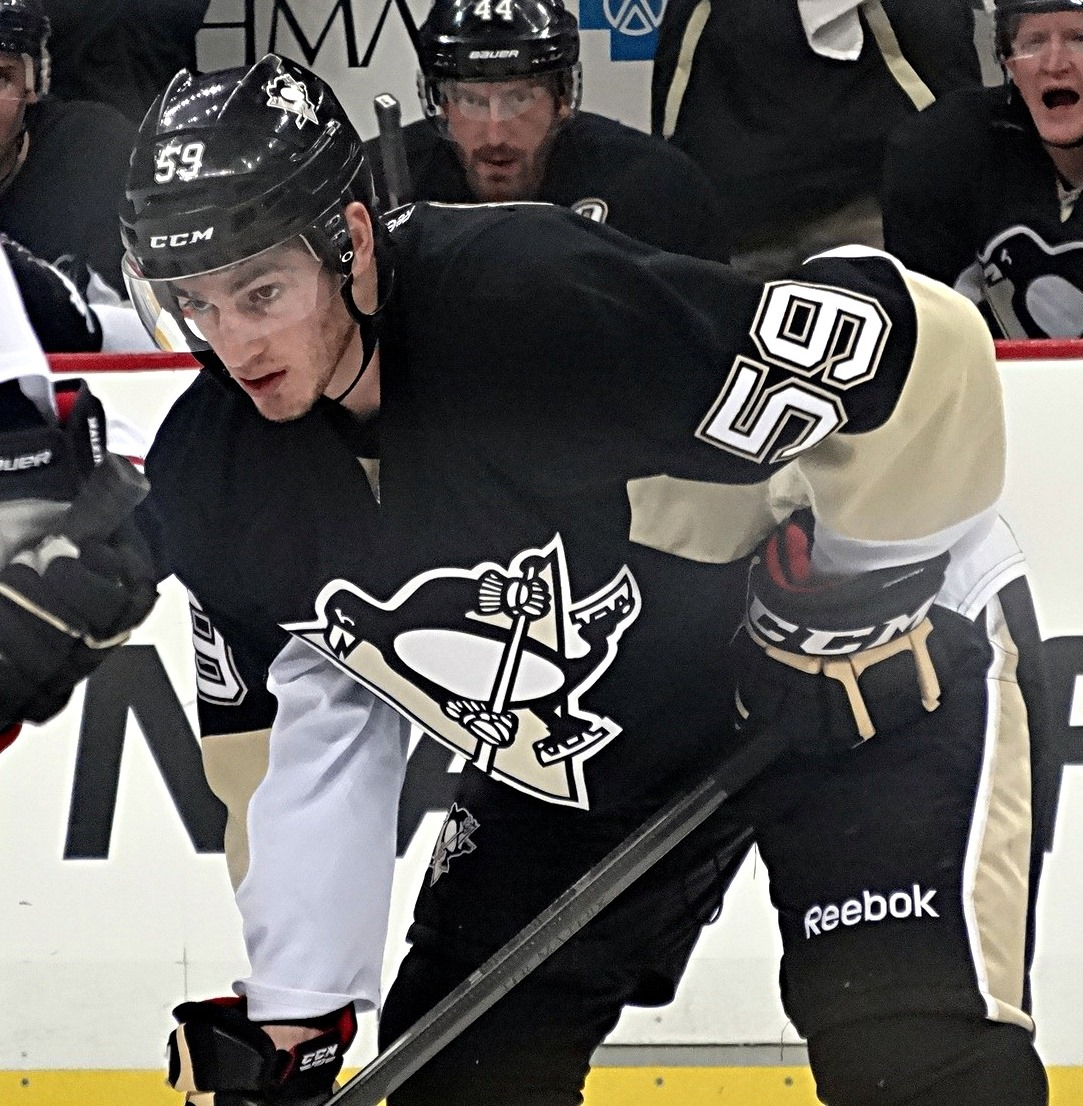
Megna with the Pittsburgh Penguins in 2013

| | | | Regular season | | | | | Playoffs |
| Season | Team | League | GP | G | A | Pts | PIM | GP | G | A | Pts | PIM |
|---|---|---|---|---|---|---|---|---|---|---|---|---|
| 2009–10 | Cedar Rapids RoughRiders | USHL | 56 | 11 | 15 | 26 | 62 | 5 | 0 | 0 | 0 | 6 |
| 2010–11 | Cedar Rapids RoughRiders | USHL | 60 | 30 | 28 | 58 | 45 | 8 | 4 | 3 | 7 | 4 |
| 2011–12 | Nebraska–Omaha Mavericks | WCHA | 38 | 13 | 18 | 31 | 27 | — | — | — | — | — |
| 2012–13 | Wilkes-Barre/Scranton Penguins | AHL | 56 | 5 | 7 | 12 | 28 | 12 | 2 | 3 | 5 | 0 |
| 2013–14 | Wilkes-Barre/Scranton Penguins | AHL | 25 | 9 | 6 | 15 | 4 | 13 | 1 | 2 | 3 | 4 |
| 2013–14 | Pittsburgh Penguins | NHL | 36 | 5 | 4 | 9 | 6 | 2 | 0 | 0 | 0 | 0 |
| 2014–15 | Wilkes-Barre/Scranton Penguins | AHL | 63 | 26 | 13 | 39 | 40 | 8 | 1 | 4 | 5 | 2 |
| 2014–15 | Pittsburgh Penguins | NHL | 12 | 0 | 1 | 1 | 14 | — | — | — | — | — |
| 2015–16 | Hartford Wolf Pack | AHL | 65 | 15 | 29 | 44 | 22 | — | — | — | — | — |
| 2015–16 | New York Rangers | NHL | 6 | 1 | 1 | 2 | 2 | — | — | — | — | — |
| 2016–17 | Utica Comets | AHL | 4 | 1 | 2 | 3 | 0 | — | — | — | — | — |
| 2016–17 | Vancouver Canucks | NHL | 58 | 4 | 4 | 8 | 6 | — | — | — | — | — |
| 2017–18 | Utica Comets | AHL | 25 | 4 | 9 | 13 | 6 | — | — | — | — | — |
| 2017–18 | Vancouver Canucks | NHL | 1 | 0 | 0 | 0 | 0 | — | — | — | — | — |
| 2018–19 | Hershey Bears | AHL | 71 | 20 | 23 | 43 | 34 | 9 | 4 | 4 | 8 | 6 |
| 2019–20 | Colorado Eagles | AHL | 43 | 18 | 16 | 34 | 22 | — | — | — | — | — |
| 2019–20 | Colorado Avalanche | NHL | 8 | 0 | 0 | 0 | 2 | — | — | — | — | — |
| 2020–21 | Colorado Avalanche | NHL | 7 | 0 | 2 | 2 | 0 | — | — | — | — | — |
| 2020–21 | Colorado Eagles | AHL | 13 | 7 | 2 | 9 | 2 | — | — | — | — | — |
| 2021–22 | Colorado Avalanche | NHL | 20 | 0 | 3 | 3 | 4 | — | — | — | — | — |
| 2021–22 | Colorado Eagles | AHL | 38 | 13 | 20 | 33 | 18 | 9 | 6 | 3 | 9 | 8 |
| 2022–23 | Colorado Eagles | AHL | 9 | 3 | 3 | 6 | 12 | — | — | — | — | — |
| 2022–23 | Colorado Avalanche | NHL | 14 | 0 | 0 | 0 | 2 | — | — | — | — | — |
| 2022–23 | Anaheim Ducks | NHL | 41 | 2 | 6 | 8 | 4 | — | — | — | — | — |
| 2023–24 | Providence Bruins | AHL | 69 | 19 | 37 | 56 | 16 | 4 | 2 | 1 | 3 | 2 |
| 2023–24 | Boston Bruins | NHL | 1 | 0 | 0 | 0 | 0 | — | — | — | — | — |
| 2024–25 | Colorado Eagles | AHL | 65 | 19 | 32 | 51 | 21 | 9 | 5 | 3 | 8 | 2 |
| 2025–26 | Colorado Eagles | AHL | 69 | 26 | 25 | 51 | 30 | 7 | 2 | 1 | 3 | 0 |
| NHL totals | | | 204 | 12 | 21 | 33 | 40 | 2 | 0 | 0 | 0 | 0 |

== Awards and honors ==
| Award | Year |
|---|---|
College
| All-WCHA Rookie Team | 2011–12 |
