= Beau Bennett =

American ice hockey player (born 1991)

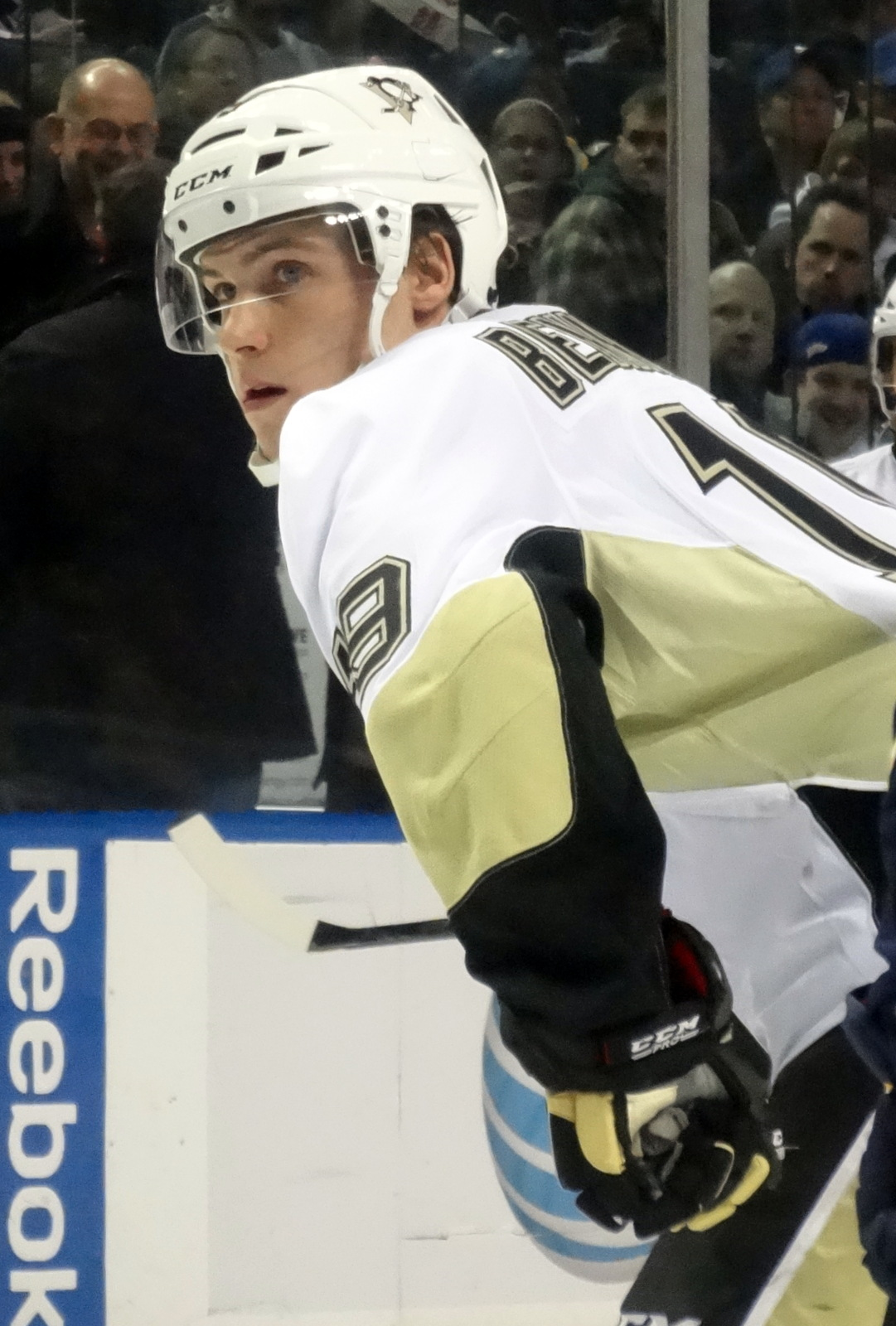
- Bennett with the Pittsburgh Penguins in 2013
- Born: November 27, 1991 (age 34) Gardena, California, U.S.
- Height: 6 ft 2 in (188 cm)
- Weight: 195 lb (88 kg; 13 st 13 lb)
- Position: Forward
- Shot: Right
- Played for: Pittsburgh Penguins; New Jersey Devils; St. Louis Blues; Dinamo Minsk
- NHL draft: 20th overall, 2010; Pittsburgh Penguins
- Playing career: 2012–2020

Beau Daniel Bennett (born November 27, 1991) is an American former professional ice hockey forward.

Bennett attended the University of Denver until 2012. He was drafted into the National Hockey League (NHL) by the Pittsburgh Penguins in the first round, 20th overall, in the 2010 NHL entry draft. Bennett is the highest-drafted California born-and-trained player in NHL history and is the first California born-and-trained player to win the Stanley Cup when he won it as a member of the Penguins in 2016. However, his name was not engraved on the Cup due to not meeting NHL requirements for number of games played during the season.

== Playing career ==
=== Minor ===
Bennett started out playing inline hockey and made a transition to playing ice hockey full-time. He played in the 2003 and 2004 Quebec International Pee-Wee Hockey Tournaments with the Los Angeles Junior Kings.

=== Junior ===
Bennett committed in June 2009 to play for Penticton's British Columbia Hockey League (BCHL) team, the Penticton Vees. He chose Penticton over the Western Hockey League's (WHL) Calgary Hitmen and the United States Hockey League's (USHL) Tri-City Storm, the two teams owning his major junior and USHL playing rights, respectively. While only a rookie, Bennett was placed on the top forward line alongside team captain Denver Manderson at center and Alex Szczechura at left wing.

Bennett had a strong start to his season before being named to represent the United States at the 2009 World Junior A Challenge. After contributing three goals and four points and winning a gold medal, Bennett returned to Penticton to record 10 goals and 10 assists in nine games. In December 2009, he was named top forward at the Canadian Junior Hockey League (CJHL) prospects games in Winkler, Manitoba. In January 2010, Bennett played in the BCHL All-Star Game.

Towards the end of the 2009–10 season, due to an injury to the top line's center, Denver Manderson, Bennett was switched to center, a position he had never played. He flourished in the position, and in the final regular season game, he scored four points to tie Mark Zengerle for the league scoring title with 120 points (Bennett had 41 goals and 79 assists; Zengerle had 33 goals and 87 assists).

In the Interior Conference finals, the Vees were facing elimination by the opposing Vernon Vipers. The Vipers hosted game 5, which went into triple overtime. After helping force a 2–2 tie by scoring a goal, Bennett set up the play that gave the Vees another chance at victory. After receiving a pass, he beat the Vipers' defenders and approached the right side of the net, followed-up by teammate Denver Manderson as well as Vernon defensemen. Feinting an attempt at a wraparound goal, he used a backhand pass through his skates to Manderson that the Vernon goaltender, Graeme Gordon, did not notice. Making as though he still carried the puck, he swept around the back of the net, with Gordon following to cover his right (net's left) side of the net, leaving his left (net's right) wide open for Manderson to shoot the perfectly-placed puck into the net. Despite the game 5 victory in overtime, however, the Vees went on to be defeated in the subsequent game 6.

Despite the less-than-perfect end to his season, Bennett was named the BCHL's Rookie of the Year, as well as the recipient of the Penticton Vees' Leading Scorer Award and the Rookie of the Year Award.

=== College ===
In his freshman season, Bennett played 37 games for the University of Denver, recording 25 points (nine goals and 16 assists). He recorded four multi-point games – two points in games against Bemidji State, Lake Superior State, Minnesota State and Alaska Anchorage. He tallied six assists during a six-game point streak from March 4 through March 19, 2011, and added 98 hits and 15 blocked shots throughout the campaign. He missed five games, however, from December 4, 2010, through January 1 with a right knee injury.

In his sophomore season, Bennett played 10 games and scored 13 points (four goals and nine assists). He injured his wrist during practice on October 26, 2011, and missed four games, returning to the lineup on November 12. He recorded five points (two goals and three assists) in a four-game point streak from November 12 to 25. On December 8, Bennett had surgery to repair a ruptured tendon in his wrist. The injury forced him to miss the final 29 games of the season. He was named to the All-WCHA Academic Team.

On April 13, 2012, Bennett signed a three-year, entry-level contract with the Pittsburgh Penguins. Bennett finished his Denver career with 38 points on 13 goals and 25 assists in 47 games.

=== Professional ===
On February 14, 2013, Bennett was called up to the NHL from Pittsburgh's American Hockey League (AHL) affiliate, the Wilkes-Barre/Scranton Penguins. He played in his first NHL game against the Winnipeg Jets on February 15. On February 24, he scored his first NHL goal, on the power play, against Tampa Bay Lightning goaltender Mathieu Garon. Bennett's play during the regular season earned him a spot in the starting lineup for the Penguins' first game in the 2013 Stanley Cup playoffs. He scored a power play goal in his first-ever playoff game, coming against New York Islanders goaltender Evgeni Nabokov on May 1.

During the 2013–14 season, Bennett's year was interrupted due to a broken wrist he suffered whilst playing against the Islanders on November 22, 2013. He had surgery the following week and returned to the lineup four months later on March 28, 2014, in a game against the Columbus Blue Jackets, where he scored the game-winning goal in a 2–1 Penguins victory.

On June 12, 2016, Bennett became the first California born-and-trained player to become a Stanley Cup champion as part of the Penguins' 2016 Stanley Cup championship over the San Jose Sharks. He played 33 games for the Penguins in the 2015–16 season, and one playoff game due to injuries. He did not meet the requirements to have his name placed on the Stanley Cup.

On June 25, 2016, Bennett was traded to the New Jersey Devils in exchange for the Detroit Red Wings' third-round draft pick in the 2016 NHL entry draft.

As a free agent after his lone season with the Devils, Bennett signed a one-year, $650,000 contract with the St. Louis Blues on July 1, 2017. In the following 2017–18 season, after attending the Blues' training camp, Bennett was placed on waivers and reassigned to begin the year with the club's AHL affiliate, the Chicago Wolves. He was later recalled and appeared in six scoreless games with St. Louis before returning to finish with 57 points in 60 games with the Wolves.

In the off-season, as a restricted free agent, Bennett opted to halt his North American career after agreeing to a one-year contract with Belarusian club Dinamo Minsk of the Kontinental Hockey League (KHL) on July 6, 2018. In the 2018–19 season, Bennett appeared in five games with Minsk, registering one assist before opting to mutually terminate his contract with the club on September 19, 2018.

Bennett returned to North America and sat out the remainder of the season. As a free agent on July 1, 2019, Bennett agreed to a one-year, two-way contract with the Arizona Coyotes. On June 26, 2021, Bennett announced his retirement.

== Personal life ==
Bennett graduated from Valley Christian High School in Cerritos, California.

Bennett's nickname is "Sunshine" after the Remember the Titans character from the same state.

In order to be allowed to play ice hockey, Bennett's parents made him learn to play an instrument. Bennett chose piano, which he played from the age of 8 to 13.

== Career statistics ==
Medal record

Men's ice hockey

Representing the United States

World Junior A Challenge
Gold medal – first place	2009 Summerside	

			Regular season					Playoffs
Season	Team	League	GP	G	A	Pts	PIM	GP	G	A	Pts	PIM
2008–09	Los Angeles Junior Kings 18U AAA	T1EHL	46	25	33	58	10	—	—	—	—	—
2009–10	Penticton Vees	BCHL	56	41	79	120	20	15	5	9	14	6
2010–11	University of Denver	WCHA	37	9	16	25	18	—	—	—	—	—
2011–12	University of Denver	WCHA	10	4	9	13	25	—	—	—	—	—
2012–13	Wilkes-Barre/Scranton Penguins	AHL	39	7	21	28	18	—	—	—	—	—
2012–13	Pittsburgh Penguins	NHL	26	3	11	14	6	6	1	0	1	0
2013–14	Pittsburgh Penguins	NHL	21	3	4	7	0	12	1	4	5	8
2013–14	Wilkes-Barre/Scranton Penguins	AHL	3	0	1	1	0	—	—	—	—	—
2014–15	Pittsburgh Penguins	NHL	49	4	8	12	16	2	0	0	0	0
2015–16	Pittsburgh Penguins	NHL	33	6	6	12	10	1	0	0	0	0
2016–17	New Jersey Devils	NHL	65	8	11	19	20	—	—	—	—	—
2017–18	Chicago Wolves	AHL	60	12	45	57	30	1	0	0	0	2
2017–18	St. Louis Blues	NHL	6	0	0	0	0	—	—	—	—	—
2018–19	Dinamo Minsk	KHL	5	0	1	1	2	—	—	—	—	—
2019–20	Tucson Roadrunners	AHL	55	12	28	40	18	—	—	—	—	—
NHL totals			200	24	40	64	52	21	2	4	6	8

== Awards and honors ==
Awards	Year	Ref
BCHL
Rookie of the Year	2010	
Brett Hull Trophy	2010	
NHL
Stanley Cup champion	2016	

Awards and achievements
Preceded by Simon Després	Pittsburgh Penguins first-round draft pick 2010	Succeeded by Joe Morrow
