= Philip Samuelsson =

Swedish-American ice hockey player

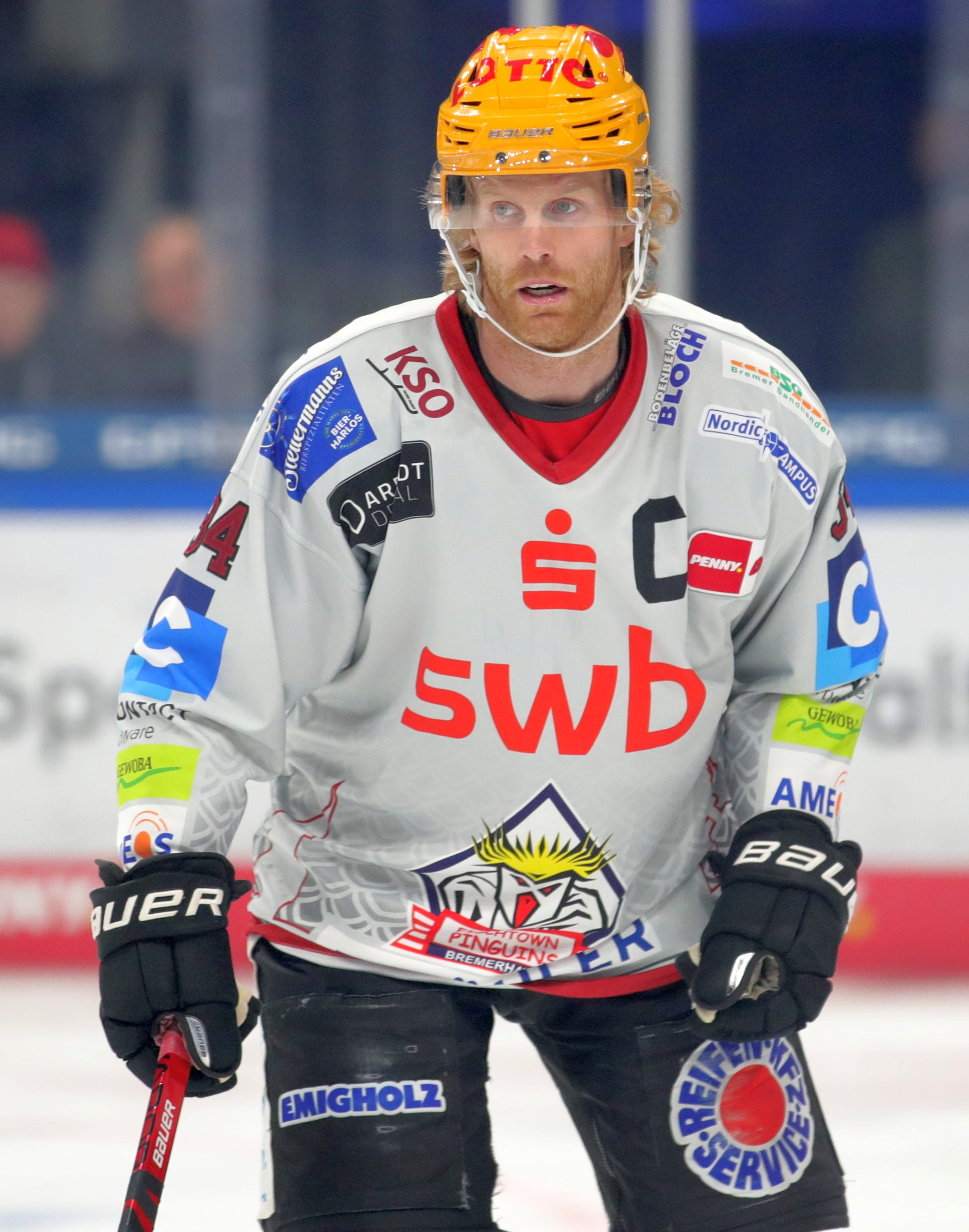
- With the Fischtown Pinguins in November 2022
- Born: July 26, 1991 (age 35) Leksand, Sweden
- Height: 6 ft 2 in (188 cm)
- Weight: 198 lb (90 kg; 14 st 2 lb)
- Position: Defence
- Shoots: Left
- DEL team Former teams: Straubing Tigers; Pittsburgh Penguins; Arizona Coyotes; Mountfield HK; Leksands IF; IK Oskarshamn; Fischtown Pinguins
- NHL draft: 61st overall, 2009; Pittsburgh Penguins
- Playing career: 2011–present

Philip Bo Samuelsson (born July 26, 1991) is a Swedish-American professional ice hockey defenceman for Straubing Tigers of the Deutsche Eishockey Liga (DEL). Samuelsson was drafted in the second round, 61st overall, of the 2009 NHL entry draft by the Pittsburgh Penguins. He is the son of two-time Penguins Stanley Cup winner, Ulf Samuelsson.

== Background ==
Samuelsson was born in Leksand, Sweden, and raised in the United States where his father played in the National Hockey League (NHL) until 2000. As a youth, he played in the 2004 Quebec International Pee-Wee Hockey Tournament with the Philadelphia Flyers minor ice hockey team. Samuelsson played at Avon Old Farms in 2005–06, and two seasons for PF Changs of the Midwest Elite Hockey League while living in Scottsdale, Arizona where his father was an assistant coach for the Phoenix Coyotes. His younger brother Henrik currently plays for Manchester Storm in the EIHL.

== Playing career ==
He began playing junior hockey with the US National Development Program before joining the Chicago Steel of the USHL in 2008–09. In his season in Chicago, Samuelsson recorded 22 assists in 54 games and was an East Division All-Star.

He competed in the 2009 IIHF World U18 Championships and won the gold medal with Team USA. After playing only one season of junior hockey, Samuelsson began playing college hockey with Boston College in 2009. He helped the Boston College Eagles to the 2010 NCAA Tournament title in his freshman year.

Philip made his NHL debut with the Pittsburgh Penguins on December 16, 2013. On December 5, 2014 Samuelsson was traded to the Arizona Coyotes for Rob Klinkhammer and a conditional fifth round pick of the 2016 NHL entry draft.

Following the 2014–15 NHL season Samuelsson became a restricted free agent under the NHL Collective Bargaining Agreement. The Arizona Coyotes made him a qualifying offer to retain his NHL rights and, on July 5, 2015, Samuelsson filed for Salary Arbitration.

On July 2, 2016, Samuelsson agreed as a free agent to a one-year, two-way contract with the Montreal Canadiens. He was assigned to AHL affiliate, the St. John's IceCaps to begin the 2016–17 season. In 40 games with the IceCaps, Samuelsson posted only 5 points from the blueline before he was traded by the Canadiens to the Carolina Hurricanes in exchange for defenseman Keegan Lowe on February 21, 2017. His father, Ulf, is currently an assistant coach with the Chicago Blackhawks.

On October 4, 2018, Samuelsson signed a one-year contract with the Lehigh Valley Phantoms.

== Career statistics ==
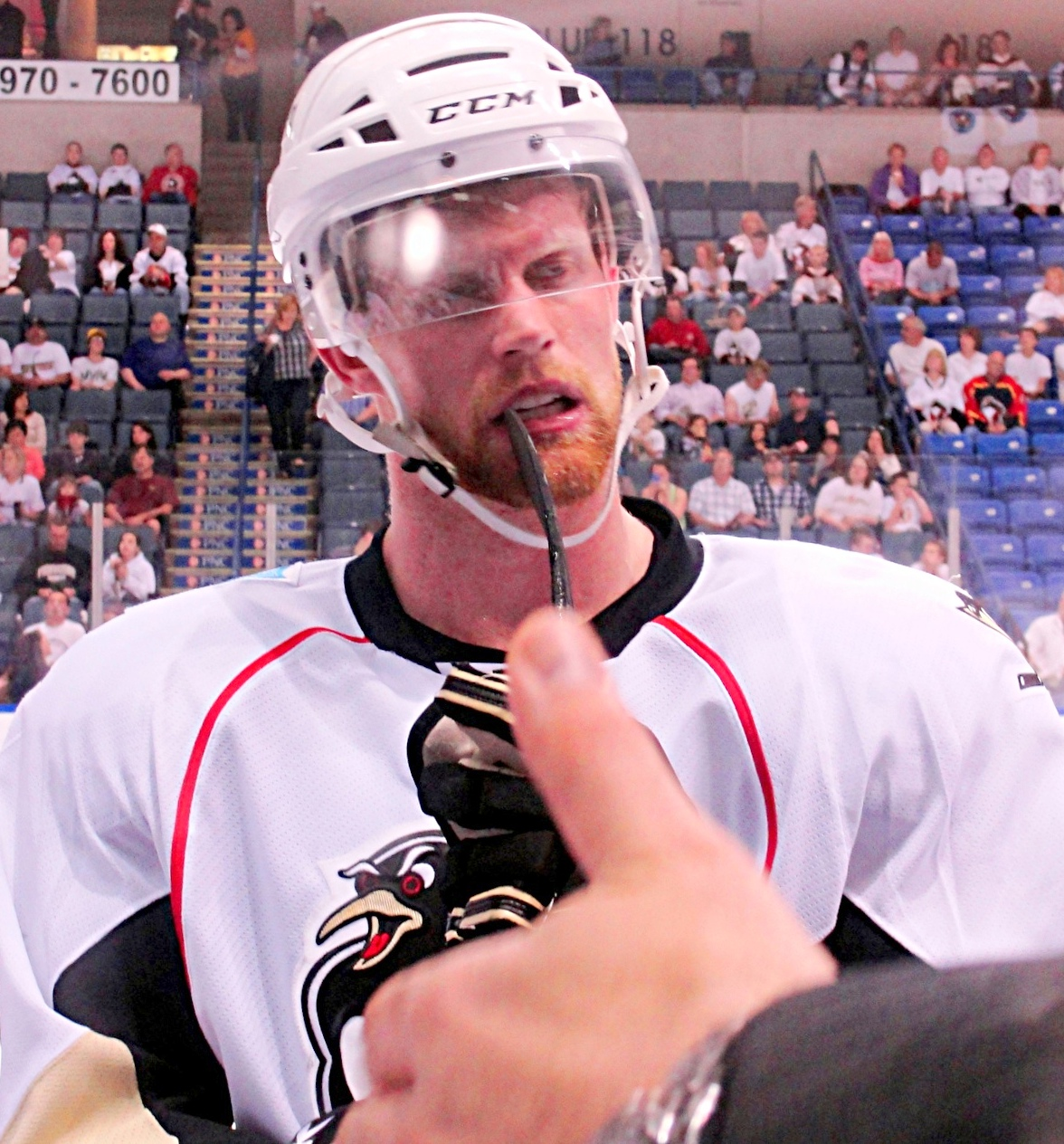
With the Wilkes-Barre/Scranton Penguins during the 2012 Calder Cup playoffs.

=== Regular season and playoffs ===
			Regular season					Playoffs
Season	Team	League	GP	G	A	Pts	PIM	GP	G	A	Pts	PIM
2008–09	Chicago Steel	USHL	54	0	22	22	60	—	—	—	—	—
2009–10	Boston College	HE	42	1	13	14	36	—	—	—	—	—
2010–11	Boston College	HE	39	4	12	16	72	—	—	—	—	—
2011–12	Wilkes-Barre/Scranton Penguins	AHL	46	1	8	9	26	10	0	1	1	18
2011–12	Wheeling Nailers	ECHL	5	0	1	1	11	3	1	0	1	0
2012–13	Wilkes-Barre/Scranton Penguins	AHL	65	2	8	10	70	15	0	2	2	8
2013–14	Wilkes-Barre/Scranton Penguins	AHL	64	3	19	22	66	8	0	1	1	8
2013–14	Pittsburgh Penguins	NHL	5	0	0	0	0	—	—	—	—	—
2014–15	Wilkes-Barre/Scranton Penguins	AHL	22	0	4	4	20	—	—	—	—	—
2014–15	Portland Pirates	AHL	51	5	15	20	31	5	1	2	3	4
2014–15	Arizona Coyotes	NHL	4	0	0	0	0	—	—	—	—	—
2015–16	Springfield Falcons	AHL	56	4	27	31	32	—	—	—	—	—
2015–16	Arizona Coyotes	NHL	4	0	0	0	2	—	—	—	—	—
2016–17	St. John's IceCaps	AHL	40	1	4	5	21	—	—	—	—	—
2016–17	Charlotte Checkers	AHL	25	3	11	14	14	5	1	1	2	2
2017–18	Charlotte Checkers	AHL	76	4	17	21	48	8	1	2	3	2
2018–19	Lehigh Valley Phantoms	AHL	67	4	11	15	26	—	—	—	—	—
2019–20	Mountfield HK	ELH	3	0	0	0	0	—	—	—	—	—
2019–20	Leksands IF	SHL	42	1	6	7	60	—	—	—	—	—
2020–21	IK Oskarshamn	SHL	52	1	12	13	36	—	—	—	—	—
2021–22	IK Oskarshamn	SHL	52	2	8	10	32	9	1	1	2	2
2022–23	Fischtown Pinguins	DEL	47	4	27	31	39	8	0	1	1	4
2023–24	Straubing Tigers	DEL	49	4	12	16	21	11	2	2	4	2
2024–25	Straubing Tigers	DEL	46	7	17	24	24	7	1	0	1	2
NHL totals			13	0	0	0	2	—	—	—	—	—
SHL totals			146	4	26	30	128	9	1	1	2	2

=== International ===
Year	Team	Event	Result	GP	G	A	Pts	PIM
2009	United States	U18	1st place, gold medalist(s)	7	0	3	3	4
Junior totals				7	0	3	3	4
