= Pierre-Luc Létourneau-Leblond =

Canadian ice hockey player

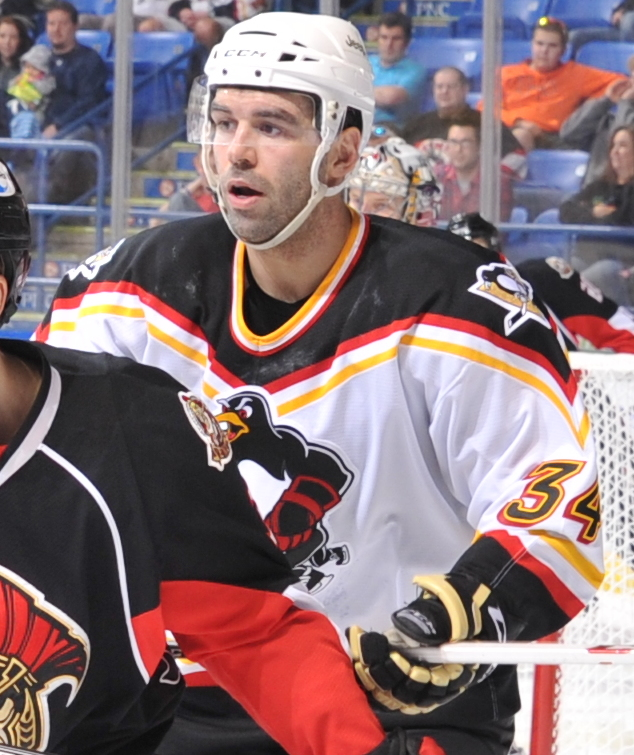
- Létourneau-Leblond with the Wilkes-Barre/Scranton Penguins in 2014
- Born: June 4, 1985 (age 41) Lévis, Quebec, Canada
- Height: 6 ft 2 in (188 cm)
- Weight: 215 lb (98 kg; 15 st 5 lb)
- Position: Right wing
- Shot: Left
- Played for: New Jersey Devils; Calgary Flames; Pittsburgh Penguins
- NHL draft: 216th overall, 2004; New Jersey Devils
- Playing career: 2005–2023

Pierre-Luc Létourneau-Leblond (born June 4, 1985) is a Canadian former professional ice hockey left winger who played in the National Hockey League (NHL) for the New Jersey Devils, Calgary Flames and Pittsburgh Penguins. In July of 2023, he was inducted into the New York Hockey Hall of Fame. He played a physical game and is known as an agitator and a fighter. He was an extremely tough player, who very rarely fell when fighting. He is known as having some of the longest fights. He is also known for having one of the longest names in all of sports.

== Playing career ==
As a youth, Leblond played in the 1998 and 1999 Quebec International Pee-Wee Hockey Tournaments with a minor ice hockey team from Pointe-Lévy.

Following his rookie season in the Quebec Major Junior Hockey League (QMJHL) with the Baie-Comeau Drakkar, Leblond was selected 216th overall in the 2004 NHL entry draft by the New Jersey Devils. He returned to Baie-Comeau for a second season before turning professional in 2005–06, splitting the season between Adirondack Frostbite of the United Hockey League (UHL) and the Albany River Rats of the American Hockey League (AHL). Leblond continued to play with the Devils' minor league affiliates until being called up to the NHL during the 2008–09 season. After an injury to forward Bobby Holík, he made his NHL debut on October 22, 2008, and registered an assist on a David Clarkson goal during a 5-0 victory over the Dallas Stars. Leblond dressed for eight Devils games during the season, registering the lone assist, as well as 22 penalty minutes.

At the beginning of the 2009–10 season, Leblond signed a contract worth $1.575 million over three seasons. He played in a career-high 27 NHL games with the Devils, recording two assists. During the season, he also played five games in the AHL. Leblond began the 2010–11 season with the Devils. On October 9, 2010, in the final period of a 7–2 loss, Leblond attempted to fight Washington Capitals rookie Marcus Johansson. The fight took place with 4 minutes and 17 seconds remaining in the third period; Leblond was charged with an instigator penalty resulting in an automatic one-game suspension. Two days later, the Devils placed Leblond on waivers; after clearing, he was assigned to the Albany Devils. In 64 AHL games, he recorded 13 points (8 goals and 5 assists) and 334 penalty minutes.

On July 14, 2011, Leblond was traded to the Calgary Flames for a fifth-round selection in the 2012 NHL entry draft. During his pre-season debut with the Flames, he received a two-minute penalty and ten-minute misconduct for hitting Vancouver Canucks forward Matt Clackson into the boards from behind. Following the game, he was suspended five games by the league, costing him $6,402.44 in salary, which was allocated to the NHL Players Association's Emergency Assistance Fund.

At the conclusion of the 2012–13 NHL lockout, Leblond was invited on a try-out to the Anaheim Ducks training camp on January 13, 2013. He was then subsequently signed to a one-year contract with the Ducks two days later and was assigned to AHL affiliate, the Norfolk Admirals.

On August 20, 2013, Leblond signed a one-year AHL contract as a free agent with the Wilkes-Barre/Scranton Penguins. During the 2013–14 season, on November 7, 2013, Leblond was signed to a two-year, two way NHL contract with parent affiliate, the Pittsburgh Penguins.

As a free agent on September 8, 2015, Leblond returned to his original team for the first time since 2011, agreeing to a one-year, two-way contract with the New Jersey Devils.

On July 1, 2016, Leblond signed as a free agent with his fourth NHL club, the Tampa Bay Lightning, on a one-year, two-way deal. Assigned to the AHL's Syracuse Crunch for the 2016–17 season, Leblond appeared in 37 games for 5 points and 121 penalty minutes, before he was loaned to the Toronto Marlies of the AHL on a condition of an NHL trade between the Lightning and Maple Leafs on February 27, 2017.

On August 12, 2017, Leblond initially announced his retirement from professional hockey. However, his retirement was short lived, agreeing to return to the professional circuit in signing midway into the 2017–18 season with the Devils' secondary affiliate, the Adirondack Thunder of the ECHL, on December 2, 2017. He featured in one game with the Thunder before re-announcing his retirement.

== Career statistics ==
			Regular season					Playoffs
Season	Team	League	GP	G	A	Pts	PIM	GP	G	A	Pts	PIM
2003–04	Baie–Comeau Drakkar	QMJHL	62	2	3	5	198	4	0	0	0	6
2004–05	Baie–Comeau Drakkar	QMJHL	67	1	6	7	229	6	0	1	1	10
2005–06	Adirondack Frostbite	UHL	31	3	6	9	165	6	0	1	1	29
2005–06	Albany River Rats	AHL	27	1	1	2	130	—	—	—	—	—
2006–07	Trenton Titans	ECHL	52	4	9	13	183	4	0	0	0	15
2007–08	Trenton Devils	ECHL	6	0	1	1	46	—	—	—	—	—
2007–08	Lowell Devils	AHL	36	3	3	6	98	—	—	—	—	—
2008–09	Lowell Devils	AHL	60	5	5	10	216	—	—	—	—	—
2008–09	New Jersey Devils	NHL	8	0	1	1	22	—	—	—	—	—
2009–10	New Jersey Devils	NHL	27	0	2	2	48	5	0	0	0	10
2009–10	Lowell Devils	AHL	5	0	2	2	18	—	—	—	—	—
2010–11	New Jersey Devils	NHL	2	0	0	0	21	—	—	—	—	—
2010–11	Albany Devils	AHL	64	8	5	13	334	—	—	—	—	—
2011–12	Calgary Flames	NHL	3	0	0	0	10	—	—	—	—	—
2011–12	Abbotsford Heat	AHL	50	1	5	6	167	5	0	0	0	18
2012–13	Norfolk Admirals	AHL	33	3	5	8	98	—	—	—	—	—
2013–14	Wilkes–Barre/Scranton Penguins	AHL	66	2	4	6	259	2	0	0	0	12
2013–14	Pittsburgh Penguins	NHL	1	0	0	0	0	—	—	—	—	—
2014–15	Wilkes–Barre/Scranton Penguins	AHL	55	2	4	6	241	4	0	0	0	7
2015–16	Albany Devils	AHL	52	1	5	6	131	3	0	0	0	8
2016–17	Syracuse Crunch	AHL	37	1	4	5	121	—	—	—	—	—
2016–17	Toronto Marlies	AHL	1	0	0	0	7	—	—	—	—	—
2017–18	Adirondack Thunder	ECHL	1	0	0	0	0	—	—	—	—	—
2019–20	Les Pétroliers du Nord	LNAH	23	2	7	9	116	—	—	—	—	—
2021–22	Trois–Rivières Lions	ECHL	1	0	0	0	7	—	—	—	—	—
2022–23	Trois–Rivières Lions	ECHL	2	0	0	0	0	—	—	—	—	—
AHL totals			486	27	43	70	1820	14	0	0	0	45
ECHL totals			62	4	10	14	236	4	0	0	0	15
NHL totals			41	0	3	3	101	5	0	0	0	10
