= Adam Payerl =

Canadian ice hockey player

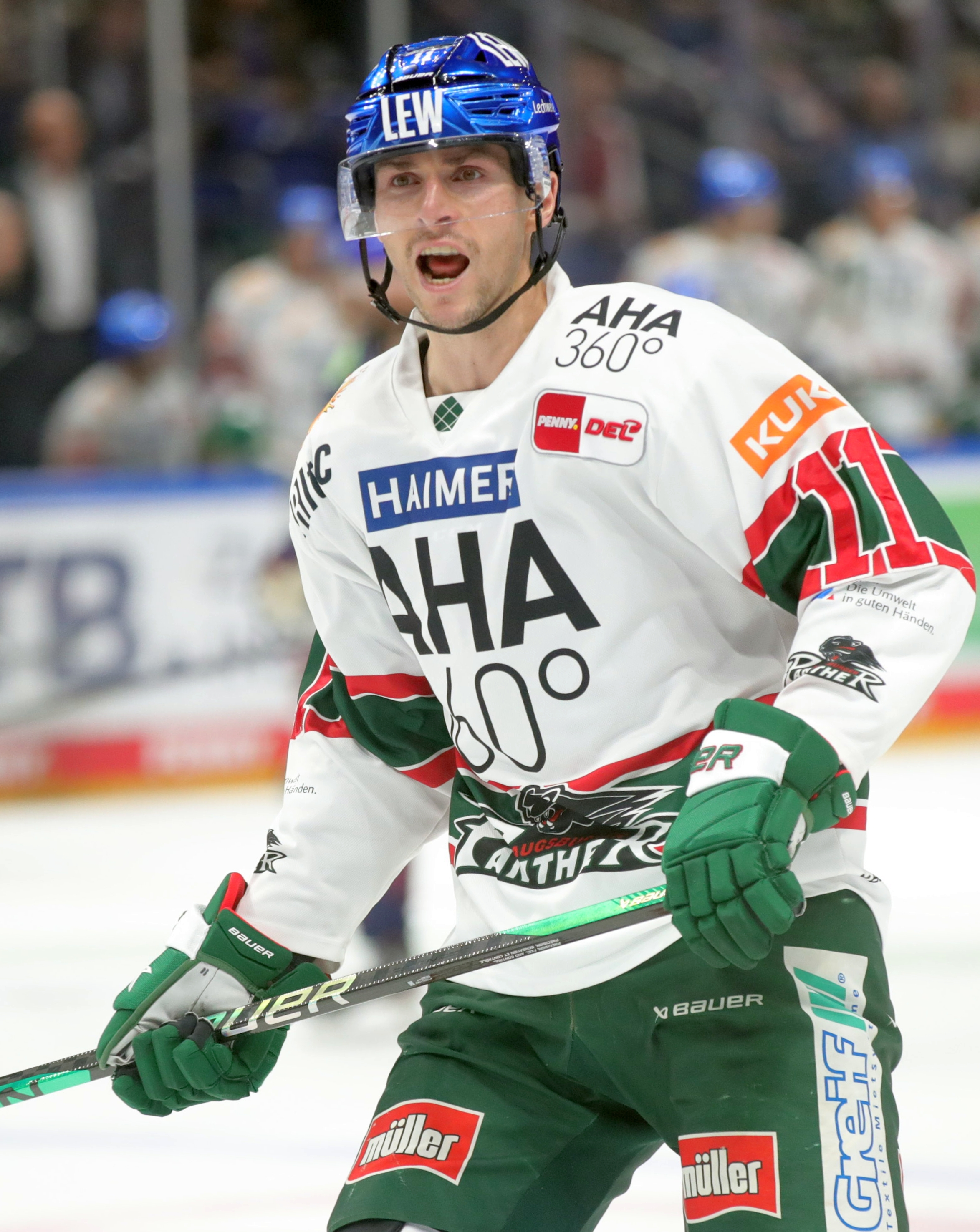
- Payerl with the Augsburger Panther in 2023
- Born: March 4, 1991 (age 35) Kitchener, Ontario, Canada
- Height: 6 ft 2 in (188 cm)
- Weight: 203 lb (92 kg; 14 st 7 lb)
- Position: Centre
- Shoots: Right
- DEL team Former teams: Krefeld Pinguine; Pittsburgh Penguins; Augsburger Panther; EC Red Bull Salzburg
- NHL draft: Undrafted
- Playing career: 2012–present

Adam Payerl (born March 4, 1991) is a Canadian professional ice hockey forward. He is currently under contract with Düsseldorfer EG of the Deutsche Eishockey Liga (DEL). He has previously played with the Pittsburgh Penguins in the National Hockey League (NHL).

== Playing career ==
Payerl played four seasons (2007–2011) of major junior hockey in the Ontario Hockey League (OHL), scoring 60 goals and 83 assists for 143 points, while earning 303 penalty minutes, in 306 OHL games played.

On March 1, 2012, the Pittsburgh Penguins of the National Hockey League (NHL) signed Payerl as an undrafted free agent to a three-year entry-level contract, and he made his professional debut with their AHL affiliate, the Wilkes-Barre/Scranton Penguins.

On April 6, 2014, Payerl made his NHL debut with the Penguins playing against the Colorado Avalanche.

Following the completion of his entry-level contract with the Penguins, and having suffered from injury in his final year with AHL affiliate in Wilkes-Barre, Payerl was not tendered a qualifying offer and was released to free agency. He went un-signed over the summer before belatedly signing a contract in the ECHL with the Cincinnati Cyclones on September 11, 2015. Prior to the beginning of the 2015–16 season with the Cyclones, Payerl was signed to a try-out contract to attend the Milwaukee Admirals training camp on September 29, 2015. He featured in 8 games with the Admirals, impressing with 4 points to be released from his try-out and signed to an AHL contract for the remainder of the season on November 11, 2015. Upon completing the season with the Admirals and posting a career high 29 points, Payerl was signed to a one-year, two-way contract with parent affiliate, the Nashville Predators on April 21, 2016.

On September 24, 2017, Payerl as a free agent was announced to have signed a one-year AHL deal with the Providence Bruins. In his lone season with Providence in 2017–18, Payerl was limited to 44 games through injury, posting 9 goals and 17 points.

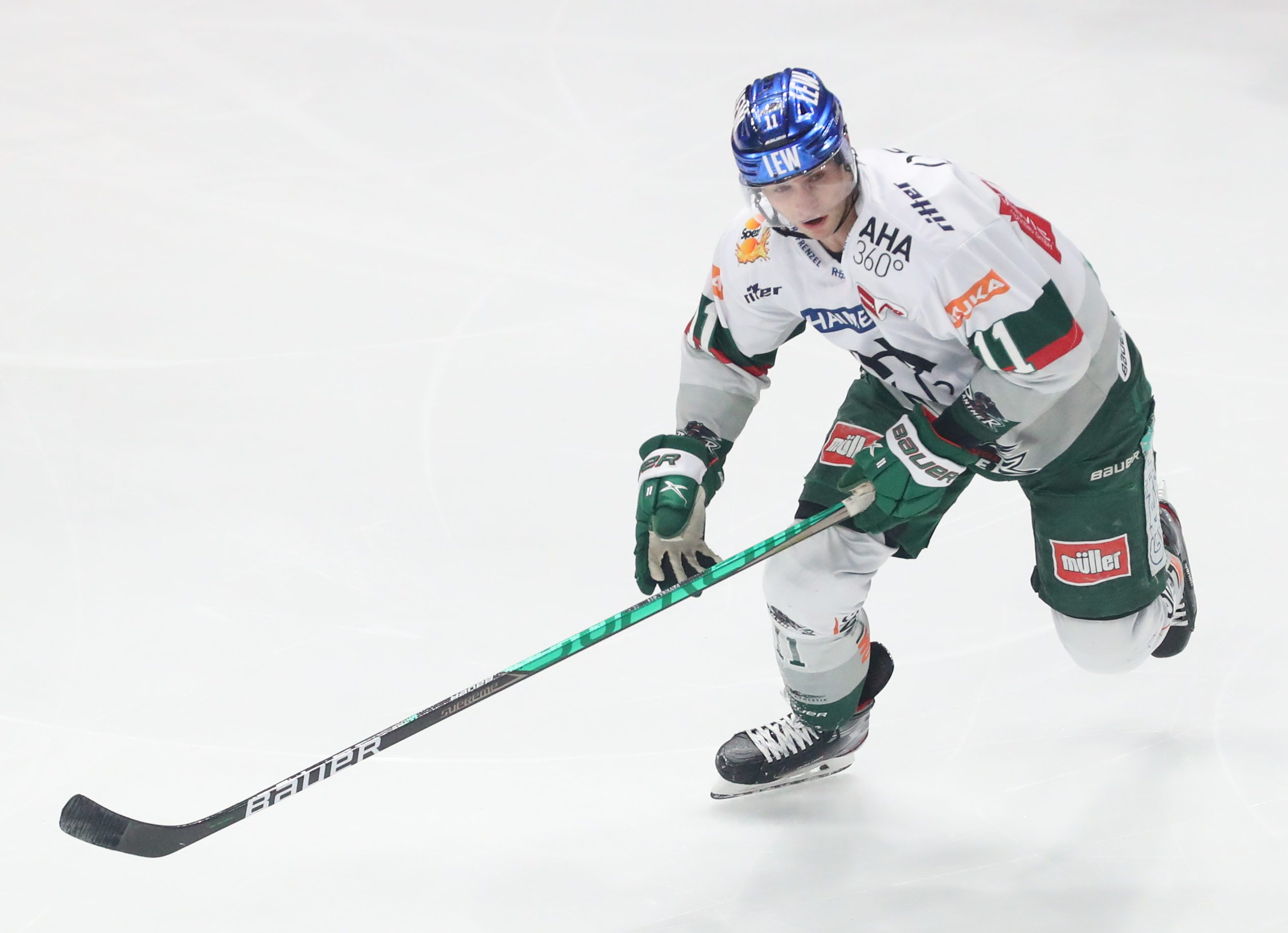
Payerl with Augsburg in 2022

In the following off-season, Payerl agreed to his first contract abroad in signing a one-year deal with German outfit, Augsburger Panther of the DEL, on May 17, 2018.

In his fifth season with the Augsburger Panther in 2022–23, Payerl contributed with 9 goals and 17 points through 45 regular season games, however was unable to help prevent the Panthers finish in a relegation position. Payerl left the club at the conclusion of his contract on March 16, 2023.

On June 30, 2023, Payerl left Germany and signed a contract with Austrian club, EC Red Bull Salzburg of the neighbouring ICE Hockey League (ICEHL).

== Career statistics ==
			Regular season					Playoffs
Season	Team	League	GP	G	A	Pts	PIM	GP	G	A	Pts	PIM
2007–08	Barrie Colts	OHL	47	4	3	7	20	1	0	0	0	0
2008–09	Barrie Colts	OHL	68	7	10	17	59	5	0	1	1	8
2009–10	Belleville Bulls	OHL	67	17	26	43	39	—	—	—	—	—
2010–11	Belleville Bulls	OHL	63	10	19	29	79	4	0	0	0	0
2011–12	Belleville Bulls	OHL	61	22	25	47	106	6	1	2	3	9
2011–12	Wilkes-Barre/Scranton Penguins	AHL	2	0	1	1	2	—	—	—	—	—
2012–13	Wilkes-Barre/Scranton Penguins	AHL	44	3	7	10	53	15	2	1	3	13
2012–13	Wheeling Nailers	ECHL	4	1	0	1	15	—	—	—	—	—
2013–14	Wilkes-Barre/Scranton Penguins	AHL	43	5	6	11	39	13	1	1	2	10
2013–14	Pittsburgh Penguins	NHL	2	0	0	0	2	—	—	—	—	—
2014–15	Wilkes-Barre/Scranton Penguins	AHL	41	2	7	9	76	—	—	—	—	—
2015–16	Milwaukee Admirals	AHL	74	13	16	29	114	3	1	0	1	2
2016–17	Milwaukee Admirals	AHL	76	16	22	38	123	3	0	2	2	6
2017–18	Providence Bruins	AHL	44	9	8	17	47	4	0	0	0	4
2018–19	Augsburger Panther	DEL	49	13	16	29	146	14	2	3	5	30
2019–20	Augsburger Panther	DEL	52	17	21	38	50	—	—	—	—	—
2020–21	Augsburger Panther	DEL	32	7	5	12	16	—	—	—	—	—
2021–22	Augsburger Panther	DEL	51	24	16	40	45	—	—	—	—	—
2022–23	Augsburger Panther	DEL	45	9	8	17	58	—	—	—	—	—
2023–24	EC Red Bull Salzburg	ICEHL	29	4	6	10	10	—	—	—	—	—
2023–24	Düsseldorfer EG	DEL	15	7	4	11	2	—	—	—	—	—
NHL totals			2	0	0	0	2	—	—	—	—	—
DEL totals			244	77	70	147	317	14	2	3	5	30
