= 2013–14 Vancouver Canucks season =

NHL hockey team season

2013–14 Vancouver Canucks
- Division: 5th Pacific
- Conference: 12th Western
- 2013–14 record: 36–35–11
- Home record: 20–15–6
- Road record: 16–20–5
- Goals for: 196
- Goals against: 223

Team information
- General manager: Mike Gillis (Oct. 3 – Apr. 8); Vacant (Apr. 8–13)
- Coach: John Tortorella
- Captain: Henrik Sedin
- Alternate captains: Kevin Bieksa; Daniel Sedin; Ryan Kesler (Oct.–Nov.)
- Arena: Rogers Arena (40 games); BC Place (1 game)
- Average attendance: 19,770 (107.2%)
- Minor league affiliates: Utica Comets (AHL); Kalamazoo Wings (ECHL)

Team leaders
- Goals: Ryan Kesler (25)
- Assists: Henrik Sedin (39)
- Points: Henrik Sedin (50)
- Penalty minutes: Tom Sestito (213)
- Plus/minus: Dan Hamhuis (+13)
- Wins: Roberto Luongo (19)
- Goals against average: Roberto Luongo (2.38)

The 2013–14 Vancouver Canucks season was the franchise's 44th season in the National Hockey League (NHL). The Canucks missed the Stanley Cup playoffs for the first time since the 2007–08 season, ending their five-year playoff streak. In addition, the team recorded its worst regular season since the 1999–2000 season. Head coach John Tortorella, who had been hired in the pre-season, was fired.

In addition to hiring Tortorella in the off-season, for financial reasons the decision was made to retain goaltender Roberto Luongo instead of Cory Schneider. As a result, along with a reduced salary cap, the team was unable to pursue top free agents signing a number of restricted and unrestricted free agents instead.

The team had won their division five years in a row previously, and had finished first in the entire league twice in the last three seasons. With the addition of a new head coach, and players such as Brad Richardson, both management and fans were optimistic that the team could be a Stanley Cup contender.

The team was inconsistent, playing well in October and December, but badly in November. In January the team's situation worsened. Tortorella's bombastic approach began to wear on team members, and top performers like Alex Burrows, Daniel Sedin and Henrik Sedin were failing to score goals. Things deteriorated as the year progressed. Goaltender Roberto Luongo became disgruntled with a lack of playing time and forced a trade in March, while the team continued to fall in the standings. General manager Mike Gillis was fired in April. Vancouver ended the season finishing sixth last overall out of thirty teams. This finish allowed the team to select sixth overall at the 2014 Entry Draft, the lowest the Canucks had selected since 1999 when the team selected second and third overall.

== Off-season ==
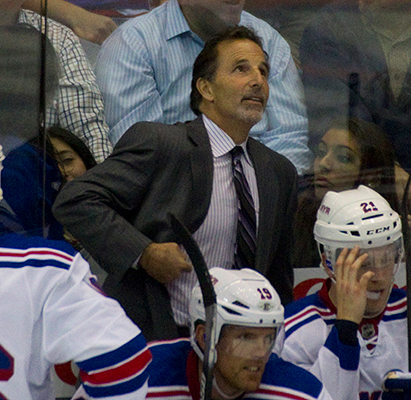
John Tortorella was hired as Vancouver's new head coach. He was fired after the regular season.

Vancouver's off-season began after they were eliminated in the first round of the 2013 Stanley Cup playoffs by the San Jose Sharks. Two weeks later, on May 22, 2013, the Canucks fired head coach Alain Vigneault, as well as assistant coaches Rick Bowness and Newell Brown. Following Vigneault's departure, general manager Mike Gillis conducted head coach interviews with John Stevens, Glen Gulutzan, Dallas Eakins, Scott Arniel, and John Tortorella. There was speculation that former New York Rangers head coach John Tortorella would be hired by the Canucks after he was spotted arriving at the Vancouver Airport on June 21. His hiring was confirmed on June 25, when he was formally introduced to Vancouver media. Coincidentally, a few days earlier, the Rangers had hired Vigneault to become Tortorella's successor as head coach of the Rangers. Glen Gulutzan was later hired as an assistant coach, as was Mike Sullivan who had been an assistant under Tortorella with the Rangers.

Another major off-season issue was the goaltending situation. Given that the salary cap for the 2013–14 season would be reduced by $6 million from the 2012–13 season, there was speculation that the Canucks would be unable to hold onto both goaltenders Roberto Luongo and Cory Schneider. Trade rumours centred around the 34-year-old Luongo, despite the fact that his contract carried an annual cap hit of $5.33 million, and was set to expire at the end of the 2021–22 season. In the end, Luongo's contract made him too expensive to trade. Schneider left Vancouver in a deal with the New Jersey Devils, in exchange for their first-round pick in the 2013 NHL Draft which was used to select Bo Horvat.

With a shrinking salary cap the Canucks had limited funds to sign new players. Vancouver could not afford to pursue top end free agents like Jarome Iginla or Nathan Horton. Instead they signed less costly restricted free agents Dale Weise, Jordan Schroeder, Kellan Lain and Christopher Tanev, as well as unrestricted free agent players Brad Richardson, Yannick Weber and Mike Santorelli. The Canucks also signed unrestricted free agent Andrew Alberts, after his previous contract with the Canucks had expired at the end of the 2012–13 season. Richardson was brought on as center for one of the bottom two lines in a checking role, and to provide the team with another reliable face-off man. Alberts and Weber were competing in the pre-season for the sixth defenceman spot. Weber was also seen as a possible power play contributor as a right-handed defenceman with a hard shot, potentially playing a role similar to that of former Canuck Sami Salo. Santorelli was not expected to make the team initially, but would add depth to the Canucks new American Hockey League (AHL) affiliate, the Utica Comets instead.

=== Training camp ===
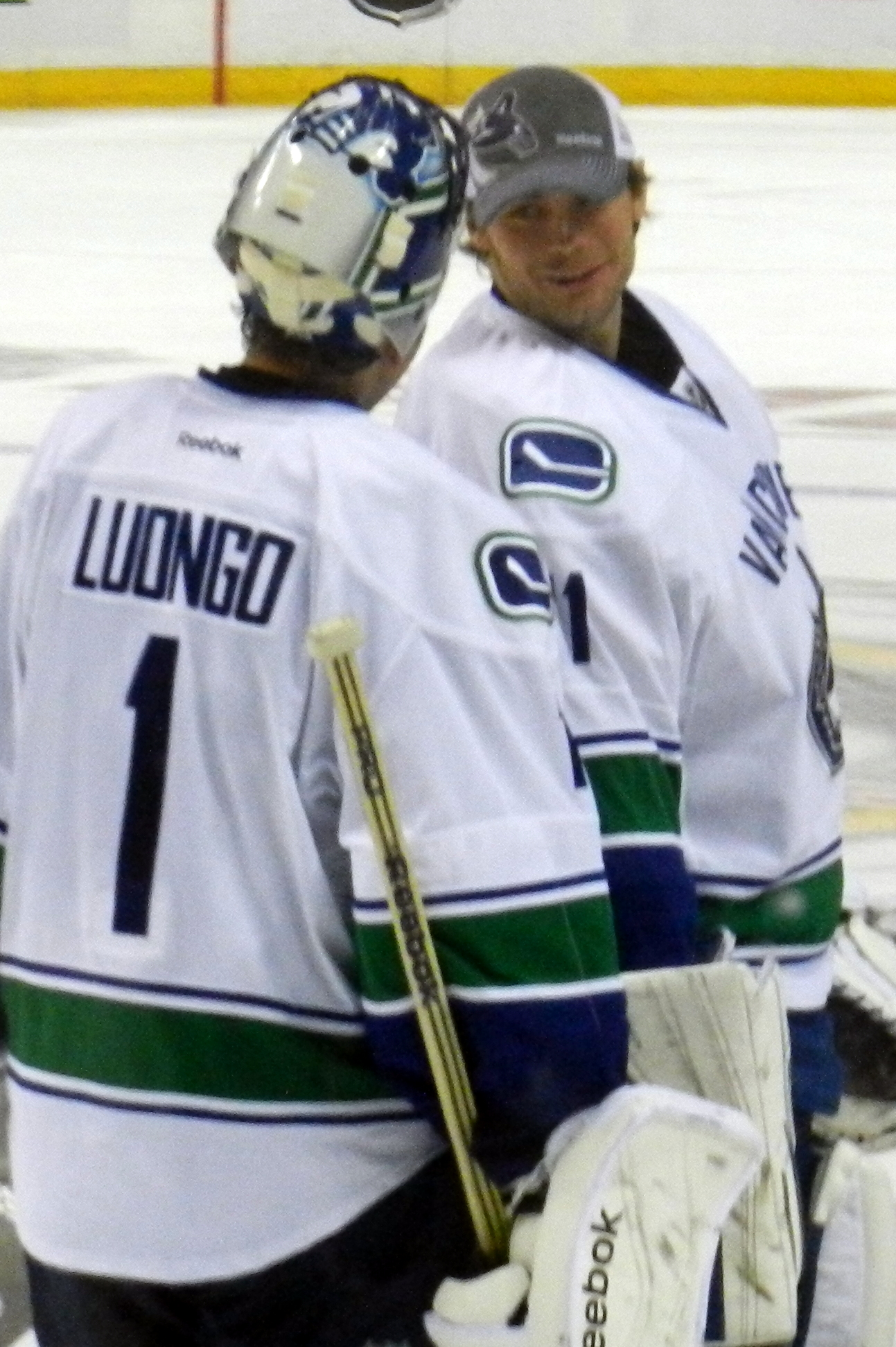
Roberto Luongo and Eddie Lack (right)

At the start of training camp Tortorella promised to make changes to the way the Canucks played. He wanted to make the team tougher to play against. Some of the techniques he felt would accomplish this were hard forechecking, protecting the puck, being strong along the boards, and increasing shot blocking. The Canucks finished the 2012–13 season as the 27th ranked team in blocked shots while the Rangers finished sixth. Tortorella also said that he would use the Sedin twins to kill penalties. The Sedins had asked Vigneault to be used on the penalty kill, but he opted to keep them rested for their offensive role instead. Upon learning that they would be killing penalties Henrik Sedin said: "It's something that I think is a big part of becoming a great player. You have to be on the ice for all situations. For us, we were counted upon to score goals, and if we didn't, then we were terrible. I think you grow as players when you play all situations." Tortorella put the Canucks through a physically demanding training camp. Players were asked to run two miles in 12 minutes and were put through a series of intense skating drills. Tortorella believed he could learn about his players when they were exhausted and asked them to give a little more.

For the second consecutive year, goaltending was a focus of training camp. After choosing to keep Luongo, the team did not hear from him. He had fired his longtime agent, and hired new representation. This development set off speculation that Luongo would not report to training camp and would try to force a trade. Shortly after the change in representation, his new agents announced that Luongo would attend training camp. In his first interview following the Schneider trade, Luongo stated that he had looked into voiding his contract, but he planned to honor it, and wanted to re-establish himself as an elite goaltender.

The Canucks had two competitors for the back-up goaltender position, Eddie Lack and Joacim Eriksson. Lack had been seen as the heir apparent for the back-up role, but following a season-ending injury after playing only 12 games in the AHL, his future was called into question. Eriksson was signed to a two-year, two-way, entry-level contract with the Canucks in the off-season after helping Skellefteå AIK to the Swedish Hockey League championship. Though neither player had any NHL experience, Lack was seen as the front runner because of his one-way contract, which paid him the same at the NHL or AHL level.

== Preseason ==
At the start of preseason, Vancouver hoped to add six young rookies to the team. While the goaltending situation almost assured that one rookie would be added, forwards Hunter Shinkaruk, Brendan Gaunce, Nicklas Jensen, and Horvat were also attempting to make the team. Defenceman Frank Corrado was looking to secure a regular spot after he played the final three regular season, and four playoff games for the Canucks in 2012–13. When asked about adding youngsters to the line-up Tortorella stated: "We're not going to force it, but we need to get some kids in our lineup." In Vancouver's first preseason game Shinkaruk and Gaunce scored goals, while Lack stopped 25 of 27 shots in two periods of work. Vancouver lost the game 3–2 to San Jose as the Sharks out shot the Canucks 42–15.

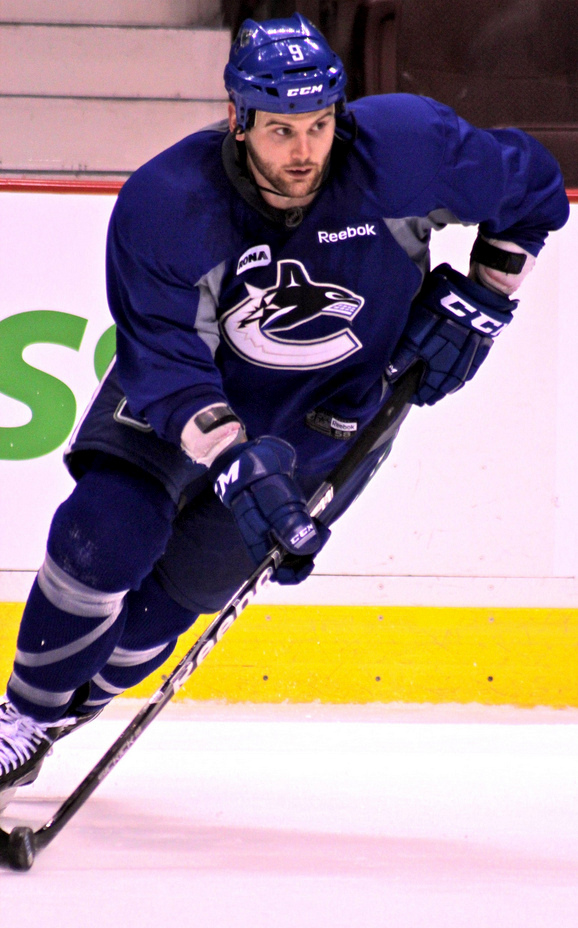
Zack Kassian received an eight-game suspension for the reckless use of his stick.

Two games later, they played the Edmonton Oilers. Winger David Booth was scheduled to return to the line-up for the first time since an ankle injury ended his previous season in March. During the morning practice he suffered a groin injury but returned for the game. Jordan Schroeder became the first casualty of shot blocking suffering a hairline fracture in his foot after being struck by a Nail Yakupov shot. Jensen was checked hard into the boards and sustained a shoulder injury. Dale Weise delivered a check to Taylor Hall striking the Oilers' forward in the head. Hall later said that the hit was "probably a mistake on both parts" and "I have to have my head up". Hall was uninjured on the play and stayed in the game. The hit was reviewed by the NHL's Senior Vice President, and disciplinarian, Brendan Shanahan who suspended Weise for the remaining three games of the preseason. Later in the game Zack Kassian attempted to deliver a body check to Sam Gagner, who made a hard stop to avoid contact. Kassian began a spin move while swinging his stick towards Gagner, lost his balance so that it hit Gagner's head. He suffered a broken jaw, eventually missing the first 13 games of the season. Kassian was assessed a double minor penalty for high sticking. In a post game interview, Oilers head coach Dallas Eakins called the action "a disturbing play by a disturbing player". During his disciplinary review of the play, Shanahan said that he accepted Kassian's claim that he did not intend to strike Gagner in the head, but that he was responsible for his actions. He suspended Kassian for eight games – the remaining three pre-season, and five regular season games.

With one week remaining in the pre-season, Vancouver assigned Eriksson to the Comets, giving Lack the back-up goaltender job. Eriksson made only one appearance in the preseason and stopped all nine shots. The move was seen as a way for Eriksson to have more playing time while adjusting to the smaller ice surface in North American rinks. In the battle for the sixth defenceman spot, Alberts struggled in the preseason. In four games he registered 17 minutes in penalties, and was on the ice for eight goals against. Weber was inconsistent. In his first, third, and fifth games he combined for one goal and three assists, with a +4 rating (positive impact), while in his second and fourth games he recorded 1 assist and a −4 rating (negative impact). The duo struggled in the second to last preseason game against San Jose, combining for a −6 rating. Though Corrado had played well enough to be considered among the team's top eight defencemen, he was assigned to Utica to allow him more, varied ice time to help his development.

Just prior to the Canucks' 23-man roster being set following the end of preseason, they claimed defenceman Ryan Stanton off waivers. Stanton had played only one NHL game but was brought in as a possible replacement for Alberts in order to keep a balance between right and left handed defencemen. The youth movement failed to take hold. Guance was sent back to the Belleville Bulls. Despite having a good camp, he was outplayed by fellow prospects, Horvat and Shinkaruk. Tortorella felt Gaunce needed to improve the tempo and the pace of his game and he would benefit from playing more minutes. Due to the injuries and suspensions, it appeared that Horvat and Shinkaruk would start the season with the Canucks. However, just days before the roster was set, Vancouver acquired forwards Zac Dalpe and Jeremy Welsh from the Carolina Hurricanes. Following the trade Horvat was sent back to the London Knights, Shinkaruk remained with the team, but was returned to the Medicine Hat Tigers to make room for Stanton. As with the rest of the prospects, Vancouver was pleased with their play, but wanted to do what was best for their development. Helping to make the decision to return the prospects to their junior teams was the emergence of Mike Santorelli who had a strong camp, where he was one of Vancouver's best forwards. He earned Tortorella's trust and was played in all situations helping him to make the team.

== Regular season ==
=== October ===
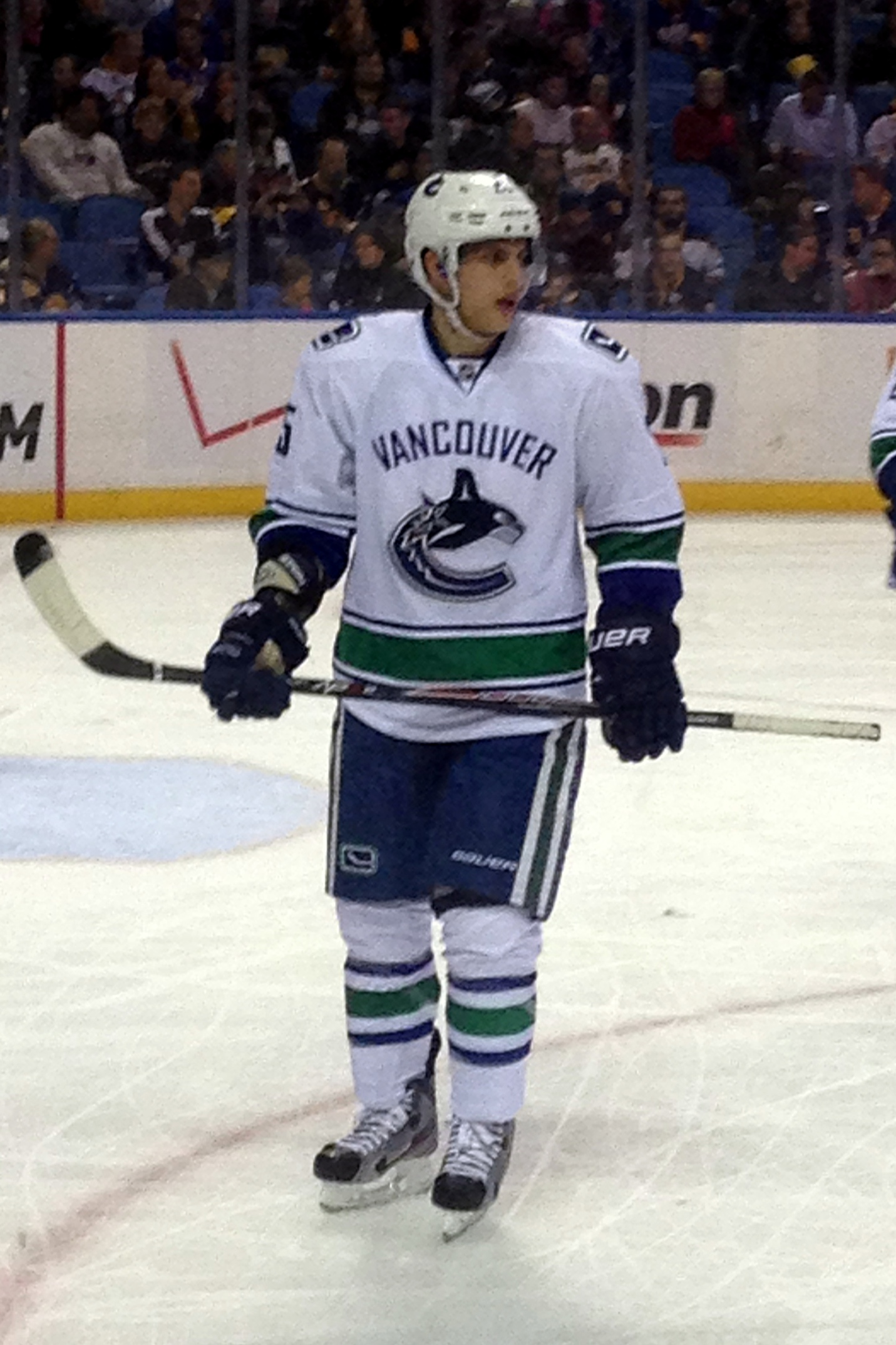
Mike Santorelli scored back to back game winners in October.

Vancouver opened the season in San Jose. Jason Garrison, a member of the top power play unit, scored a goal to give the Canucks the lead. Vancouver eventually lost 4–1. Having Garrison play with the top unit was seen as a change in philosophy from the previous season. He was originally brought in to help with the Cauncks inconsistent power play, however he was played sparingly with the top unit and the team finished 22nd of 30 in the League for power play percentage. During the game, Alexandre Burrows blocked a slap shot on a penalty kill, and suffered a hairline fracture to his foot, forcing him to miss 12 games. The Canucks earned Tortorella his first win as head coach with a 6–2 victory over Edmonton in the second game of the season. Lack made his NHL debut in the third game against the Calgary Flames. Tortorella altered his lines to get the team going, including splitting up Henrik and Daniel Sedin, something rarely done by Vigneault. The Canucks eventually won the game 5–4 in overtime on a Santorelli goal. Despite giving up four goals, Lack earned praise for his performance.

Following the Calgary game, Vancouver faced off with the New Jersey Devils. The game was the first match-up of Luongo versus Schneider. Both goaltenders tried to downplay it, though Schneider admitted he was trying to outplay Luongo. Vancouver won the game in overtime with a second straight, game-winning goal by Santorelli. Vancouver played San Jose on October 10, again losing 4–1. During the game Alexander Edler hit San Jose rookie Tomas Hertl's head, knocking his helmet off. Hertl was not hurt, and no penalty was called on the play, but Edler was suspended for three games the following day for the hit. The NHL Department of Player Safety deemed the hit illegal, as the principle point of contact was with the head. The length of the suspension was increased because Edler was a repeat offender. Tortorella believed that the suspension caused Edler to be more tentative defensively for the rest of the season. Vancouver lost the next home game before starting a seven-game road trip, their longest of the season.

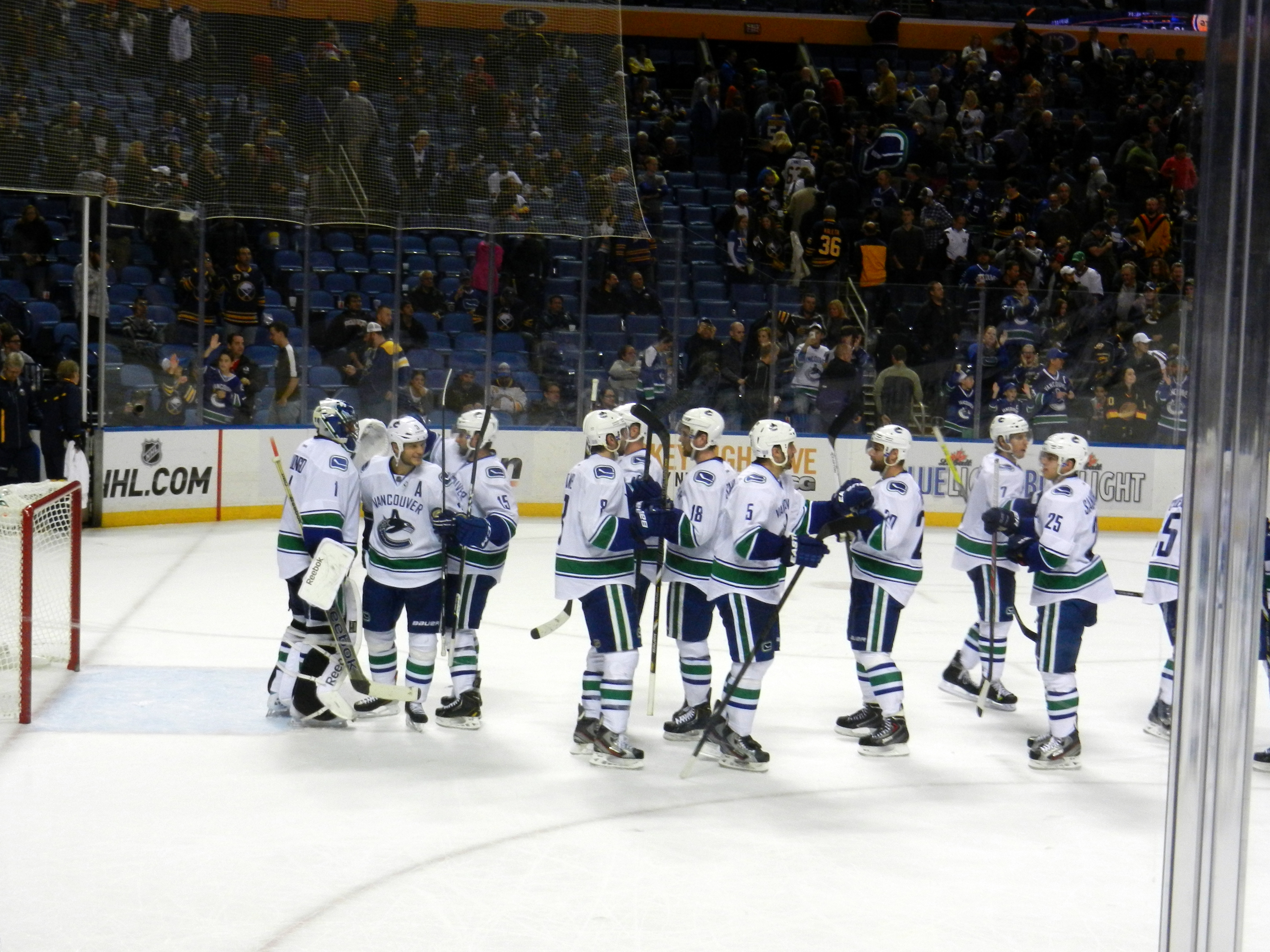
Canucks players congratulate Roberto Luongo on his 63rd career shutout.

The Canucks were down in first game of the trip against the Philadelphia Flyers, when Tortorella split up the Sedin twins leading to a comeback win for Vancouver. While the Canucks were finding ways to win, their power play produced only two goals in 20 opportunities. This left the team's power play ranked twenty-seventh of thirty following the game in Philadelphia. While the Sedin twins practiced on separate lines following successful stints apart from each other, ultimately second line centre Ryan Kesler was moved to right wing to join them on the top line. In their next game against the Buffalo Sabres, Roberto Luongo made 25 saves helping Vancouver to a 3–0 win. It was Luongo's 63rd career shutout, giving him sole possession of 15th place for all-time shutouts, breaking the tie with Turk Broda. The Canucks lost their next two games, before recording three straight wins finishing with a 5–1–1 record^{[note 1]} – the most successful road trip in team history.

The winning streak moved the Canucks into a first place tie in the Pacific Division with San Jose. Kesler recorded six goals and three assists on the trip which helped him earn the NHL's Third Star of the Week Award. Vancouver split their final two games finishing the month with a 9–5–1 record, putting them in fourth place in the division, three points behind San Jose. Although the Canucks were competitive, concerns were raised that the lengthy amount of ice time Tortorella was giving his top players would wear them down as the season progressed. Kesler and the Sedin twins led the league in total ice time among forwards, but trailed Sidney Crosby in terms of average ice time for forwards.

=== November ===
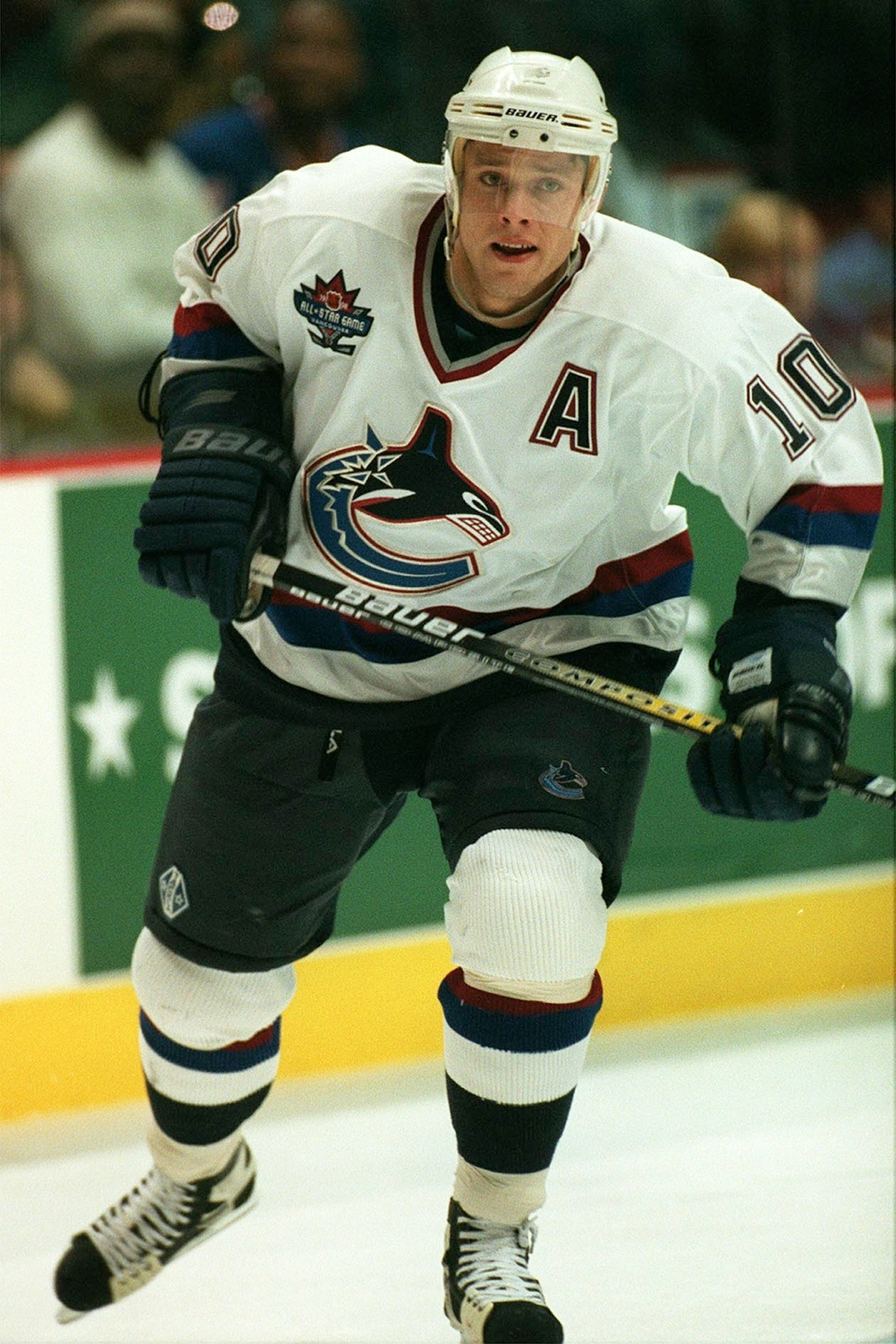
The Canucks retired Pavel Bure's number 10 in November.

On the first day of November, Vancouver signed the Sedin twins to matching four-year $28.5 million contract extensions. Before the first game of the month on November, Vancouver honoured Pavel Bure by retiring his jersey number 10. He had played seven seasons in Vancouver, scoring 254 goals, including back-to-back 60-goal seasons. He won the Calder Memorial Trophy as NHL Rookie of the Year as a Canuck, and was an integral part of the team's 1994 Stanley Cup Final run. In addition, the team also changed the name of one of its year end team awards from the Most Exciting Player Award to the Pavel Bure Most Exciting Player Award. Bure called it a "great night", adding: "It's probably the biggest honor you can get. I'm really pleased."

Vancouver won the game 4–0, with their second goal coming on a power play, the fifth of the season. The power play continued to be a struggle with the Canucks ranked twenty-eight in the league. During the game, Burrows taunted Maple Leafs' forward Phil Kessel, by making slashing motions with his stick – a reference to an altercation Kessel had with John Scott earlier in the season. This taunting led to a scuffle and both players received major penalties for fighting. Leafs' forward Dave Bolland was injured after a hit by Kassian. While finishing his check, Kassian's skate came off the ice, sliced Bolland's ankle, cutting a tendon. After the game, Kassian said that he felt it was a clean hit but added: "Obviously, people are going to talk especially with my suspension before. But there's nothing there". Toronto's general manager Dave Nonis noted that the injury was accidental. Following the Toronto game, Vancouver set out on a four-game division road trip.

Before the first game against the Phoenix Coyotes, Vancouver made some personnel changes. Booth was assigned to Utica on a conditioning assignment to help strengthen his groin, and to get more ice time to help him get up to game speed. Dalpe was called up to replace Booth after his own conditioning stint. The power play set-up was changed to four forwards and one defenceman, raising questions about Tortorella's decision to use Dan Hamhuis as the lone defenceman. Hamhuis was known more as a shutdown defender and did not have one of the Canucks more powerful shots from the point. Vancouver led before giving up the tying goal with just over a minute remaining. The game went to a shootout where Phoenix took the lead; Henrik Sedin had a chance to tie, but lost control of the puck and did not register a shot. Sedin did however, extend his point streak to a career-long 12 games and Hamhuis scored a power play goal. With the power play conversion, the Canucks were still twenty-sixth in the league at 10.9 percent.

Two days later the Canucks defeated San Jose, breaking a nine-game losing streak with the Sharks. Vancouver lost the final two games of the trip with a combined 8–2 score. Henrik Sedin went scoreless in the final three games of the trip, posting a –5 rating, and was demoted to the second line. Returning home, the Canucks fared no better, losing five of six games and posting a 1–2–3 record. In all five losses the Canucks were tied or leading the game in the third period. Before the team's November 28 game in Ottawa, Totarella challenged Luongo to make more saves at important times during the game to help Vancouver win. He also moved Kesler back to center after he had failed to score an even strength goal in 12 games. During the game Daniel Sedin scored his 300th career goal becoming the third player in franchise history to reach this mark, behind Markus Naslund and Trevor Linden.

In the final game of the month Vancouver played the New York Rangers and former coach Alain Vigneault. Daniel Sedin said of the game: "I know our former coach is over there, but once you get into the game you're not going to think too much about it. He was with us for seven years and he meant a lot to this franchise, so it's going to be fun seeing him again but once the game gets going we want the two points, and so does he". Tortorella stated: "I'm not going to lie, it's a little weird for me coming back, but once the game starts, it's about playing and trying to find a way to get a win". The Canucks lost the game 5–2, finishing the month with 31 points, four points out of the final playoff spot.

=== December through February ===
During December, the team won seven straight games beginning with a 6–2 victory over the Boston Bruins. They finished the month with a 10–1–2 record. Starting goaltender Roberto Luongo was injured during a 2–1 victory over the Winnipeg Jets. Eddie Lack was the starting goalie for the rest of December.

The team started to struggle in January after losing to the Philadelphia Flyers at the end of December. Luongo managed to recover from his injury and played in the game against the Los Angeles Kings. But he was injured again when Dustin Brown scored and crashed into him, and was unable to play for six games. Eddie Lack struggled, posting a 1–3–2 record. On January 15, the Canucks lost 9–1 to the Anaheim Ducks, the worst scoring game of the season. Henrik Sedin was injured during the next game. On January 18, the Canucks played the Calgary Flames, a game which featured a first period brawl. Between periods, John Tortorella attempted to enter the Flames' dressing room, an act that resulted in the NHL suspending him for 15 days. Bob Hartley, the Flames' coach, was fined over the incident. Mike Sullivan took over from Tortorella as coach, but the team posted a losing record of 2–4–0 for the rest of January.

Tortorella returned for the first game in February. The Canucks lost to the Detroit Red Wings. Subsequently, the team lost four straight games which result in a seven-game losing streak when combined with the last two games in January. This was the team's worst losing streak since the 1990s.

The Canucks ended their losing streak against the St. Louis Blues, but lost to the Minnesota Wild a few days later. Eddie Lack started both games, posting a 1–0–1 record, which convinced John Tortorella to start him in the 2014 Heritage Classic.

=== March ===
During the Heritage Classic game the Canucks led 2–0, but ultimately lost 4–2. When they were down 3–2, fans were chanting: "We Want Lu!" (Luongo). During post-game interviews Tortorella said that it was his choice to play Lack. On March 4, Luongo was traded to the Florida Panthers in exchange for Shawn Matthias and Jacob Markstrom. Lack started in goal for the rest of March. On March 10, Vancouver was leading the New York Islanders 3–0 after two periods. The Islanders then scored seven goals in the third period, leading to a 7–4 Vancouver loss. This was the Canucks' worst single period of play since one in 1999 against the Red Wings. On March 16, the Canucks faced Roberto Luongo and the Florida Panthers for the first time since he had been traded. The Canucks won 4–3 in a shoot out. With playoff hopes fading quickly near the end of March, Vancouver then posted a three-game winning streak between March 20 and March 26. The streak came to an end with a loss to the Colorado Avalanche. Vancouver lost to the Anaheim Ducks in the last game of the month.

=== April ===
On April 1, Alain Vigneault returned to Vancouver with the New York Rangers. The Rangers won 3–1, damaging the Canucks' playoff hopes. A few days later, Mike Gillis was interviewed on TSN 1040 radio. He said, "I am not sure I'll be back next season." On April 7, in a game which saw the Ducks up 3–0 against the Canucks with three minutes remaining in the game, fans starting chanting "Fire Gillis". The loss officially ended Vancouver's five-year playoff streak. Gillis was fired the next day. Trevor Linden, a former Canucks winger, replaced Gillis as president of hockey operations, though the team still needed to find a new general manager. After 19-straight starts, Lack was replaced in goal by Jacob Markstrom for the final three games. On April 12, after a 5–2 loss to the Edmonton Oilers, Ryan Smyth announced his retirement. On the last day of the regular season, Daniel Sedin was hit by Paul Byron and left the ice on a stretcher with minor injuries. The Canucks went on to win 5–1 over the Calgary Flames. The Canucks ended the 2013–14 season with a 36–35–11 record.

== Canucks players in the Olympics ==
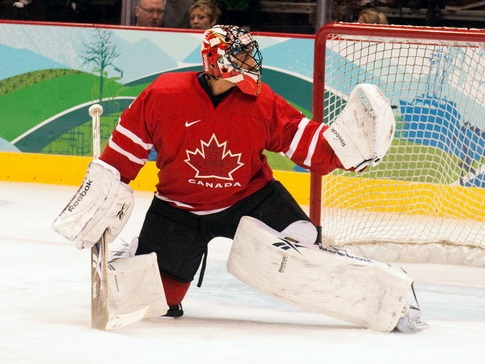
Roberto Luongo won a gold medal for Canada in the 2010 Winter Olympics as Canada's starting goaltender.

The NHL took a two-week break to allow players to play for their countries' teams in the ice hockey event at the 2014 Winter Olympics in Sochi, Russia. Eight Canucks represented their respective countries at the Olympics.

Ryan Kesler played for Team USA. Yannick Weber was named to Team Switzerland, one of eight NHL players on the Swiss national team. On December 7, 2014, both Canada and Sweden announced their teams. The Sedin twins and Alexander Edler were named to the Swedish national team. Later in the day Luongo and Dan Hamhuis were named to Team Canada. (Luongo had won a gold medal for Canada in the 2010 Winter Olympics as the starting goaltender.) An eighth member of the Canucks organization was named to an Olympic team as prospect Ronalds Kenins joined the Latvia national team after having a strong Olympic qualifying tournament.

Team Canada won the gold medal game with a 3–0 victory over Team Sweden. Dan Hamhuis and Roberto Luongo returned to Vancouver with gold medals, while Alexander Edler and Daniel Sedin returned with silver medals.

== Standings ==
Pacific Division
Pos	Team	GP	W	L	OTL	ROW	GF	GA	GD	Pts
1	y – Anaheim Ducks	82	54	20	8	51	266	209	+57	116
2	x – San Jose Sharks	82	51	22	9	41	249	200	+49	111
3	x – Los Angeles Kings	82	46	28	8	38	206	174	+32	100
4	Phoenix Coyotes	82	37	30	15	31	216	231	−15	89
5	Vancouver Canucks	82	36	35	11	31	196	223	−27	83
6	Calgary Flames	82	35	40	7	28	209	241	−32	77
7	Edmonton Oilers	82	29	44	9	25	203	270	−67	67

Source: National Hockey League
x – Clinched playoff spot; y – Clinched division

Western Conference Wild Card
Pos	Div	Team	GP	W	L	OTL	ROW	GF	GA	GD	Pts
1	CE	x – Minnesota Wild	82	43	27	12	35	207	206	+1	98
2	CE	x – Dallas Stars	82	40	31	11	36	235	228	+7	91
3	PA	Phoenix Coyotes	82	37	30	15	31	216	231	−15	89
4	CE	Nashville Predators	82	38	32	12	36	216	242	−26	88
5	CE	Winnipeg Jets	82	37	35	10	29	227	237	−10	84
6	PA	Vancouver Canucks	82	36	35	11	31	196	223	−27	83
7	PA	Calgary Flames	82	35	40	7	28	209	241	−32	77
8	PA	Edmonton Oilers	82	29	44	9	25	203	270	−67	67

Source: National Hockey League
x – Clinched playoff spot

== Schedule and results ==
=== Pre-season ===
2013 pre-season game log: 2–4–0 (Home: 2–2–0; Road: 0–2–0)
#	Date	Visitor	Score	Home	OT	Decision	Attendance	Record	Recap
1	September 16	San Jose	3–2	Vancouver		Cannata	18,910	0–1–0	Recap
2	September 18	Edmonton	4–1	Vancouver		Luongo	18,910	0–2–0	Recap
3	September 21	Vancouver	2–5	Edmonton		Lack	16,839	0–3–0	Recap
4	September 23	Phoenix	1–6	Vancouver		Luongo	18,910	1–3–0	Recap
5	September 24	Vancouver	0–5	San Jose		Lack	15,149	1–4–0	Recap
6	September 26	NY Rangers	0–5	Vancouver		Luongo	18,910	2–4–0	Recap

=== Regular season ===
2013–14 game log

October: 9–5–1 (Home: 3–3–0; Road: 6–2–1)
#	Date	Visitor	Score	Home	OT	Decision	Attendance	Record	Pts	Recap
1	October 3	Vancouver	1–4	San Jose		Luongo	17,562	0–1–0	0	Recap
2	October 5	Edmonton	2–6	Vancouver		Luongo	18,910	1–1–0	2	Recap
3	October 6	Vancouver	5–4	Calgary	OT	Lack	19,289	2–1–0	4	Recap
4	October 8	New Jersey	2–3	Vancouver	OT	Luongo	18,910	3–1–0	6	Recap
5	October 10	San Jose	4–1	Vancouver		Luongo	18,910	3–2–0	6	Recap
6	October 12	Montreal	4–1	Vancouver		Luongo	18,910	3–3–0	6	Recap
7	October 15	Vancouver	3–2	Philadelphia		Luongo	19,588	4–3–0	8	Recap
8	October 17	Vancouver	3–0	Buffalo		Luongo	18,374	5–3–0	10	Recap
9	October 19	Vancouver	3–4	Pittsburgh	SO	Luongo	18,657	5–3–1	11	Recap
10	October 20	Vancouver	1–3	Columbus		Lack	14,168	5–4–1	11	Recap
11	October 22	Vancouver	5–4	NY Islanders	OT	Luongo	11,922	6–4–1	13	Recap
12	October 24	Vancouver	3–2	New Jersey	SO	Luongo	13,203	7–4–1	15	Recap
13	October 25	Vancouver	3–2	St. Louis	OT	Lack	17,604	8–4–1	17	Recap
14	October 28	Washington	2–3	Vancouver		Luongo	18,910	9–4–1	19	Recap
15	October 30	Detroit	2–1	Vancouver		Luongo	18,910	9–5–1	19	Recap

November: 4–5–4 (Home: 2–2–3; Road: 2–3–1)
#	Date	Visitor	Score	Home	OT	Decision	Attendance	Record	Pts	Recap
16	November 2	Toronto	0–4	Vancouver		Luongo	18,910	10–5–1	21	Recap
17	November 5	Vancouver	2–3	Phoenix	SO	Luongo	13,459	10–5–2	22	Recap
18	November 7	Vancouver	4–2	San Jose		Luongo	17,562	11–5–2	24	Recap
19	November 9	Vancouver	1–5	Los Angeles		Luongo	18,118	11–6–2	24	Recap
20	November 10	Vancouver	1–3	Anaheim		Lack	17,174	11–7–2	24	Recap
21	November 14	San Jose	2–1	Vancouver	OT	Luongo	18,910	11–7–3	25	Recap
22	November 17	Dallas	2–1	Vancouver		Luongo	18,910	11–8–3	25	Recap
23	November 19	Florida	3–2	Vancouver	SO	Luongo	18,910	11–8–4	26	Recap
24	November 22	Columbus	2–6	Vancouver		Luongo	18,910	12–8–4	28	Recap
25	November 23	Chicago	2–1	Vancouver		Luongo	18,910	12–9–4	28	Recap
26	November 25	Los Angeles	3–2	Vancouver	OT	Luongo	18,910	12–9–5	29	Recap
27	November 28	Vancouver	5–2	Ottawa		Luongo	17,931	13–9–5	31	Recap
28	November 30	Vancouver	2–5	NY Rangers		Luongo	18,006	13–10–5	31	Recap

December: 10–1–2 (Home: 6–0–1; Road: 4–1–1)
#	Date	Visitor	Score	Home	OT	Decision	Attendance	Record	Pts	Recap
29	December 1	Vancouver	3–2	Carolina		Lack	14,916	14–10–5	33	Recap
30	December 3	Vancouver	3–1	Nashville		Luongo	15,330	15–10–5	35	Recap
31	December 6	Phoenix	2–3	Vancouver	OT	Luongo	18,910	16–10–5	37	Recap
32	December 8	Colorado	1–3	Vancouver		Luongo	18,910	17–10–5	39	Recap
33	December 9	Carolina	0–2	Vancouver		Lack	18,910	18–10–5	41	Recap
34	December 13	Edmonton	0–4	Vancouver		Luongo	18,910	19–10–5	43	Recap
35	December 14	Boston	2–6	Vancouver		Luongo	18,910	20–10–5	45	Recap
36	December 17	Vancouver	2–3	Minnesota	SO	Luongo	18,531	20–10–6	46	Recap
37	December 19	Vancouver	1–4	Dallas		Luongo	15,644	20–11–6	46	Recap
38	December 20	Vancouver	3–2	Chicago	SO	Lack	21,966	21–11–6	48	Recap
39	December 22	Winnipeg	1–2	Vancouver		Lack	18,910	22–11–6	50	Recap
40	December 29	Vancouver	2–0	Calgary		Lack	19,289	23–11–6	52	Recap
41	December 30	Philadelphia	4–3	Vancouver	SO	Lack	18,910	23–11–7	53	Recap

January: 4–9–2 (Home: 3–4–1; Road: 1–5–1)
#	Date	Visitor	Score	Home	OT	Decision	Attendance	Record	Pts	Recap
42	January 1	Tampa Bay	4–2	Vancouver		Lack	18,910	23–12–7	53	Recap
43	January 4	Vancouver	1–3	Los Angeles		Luongo	18,118	23–13–7	53	Recap
44	January 5	Vancouver	3–4	Anaheim	OT	Lack	17,174	23–13–8	54	Recap
45	January 7	Pittsburgh	5–4	Vancouver	SO	Lack	18,910	23–13–9	55	Recap
46	January 10	St. Louis	1–2	Vancouver		Lack	18,910	24–13–9	57	Recap
47	January 13	Vancouver	0–1	Los Angeles		Lack	18,118	24–14–9	57	Recap
48	January 15	Vancouver	1–9	Anaheim		Lack	17,145	24–15–9	57	Recap
49	January 16	Vancouver	0–1	Phoenix		Lack	12,307	24–16–9	57	Recap
50	January 18	Calgary	2–3	Vancouver	SO	Luongo	18,910	25–16–9	59	Recap
51	January 21	Vancouver	2–1	Edmonton		Luongo	16,839	26–16–9	61	Recap
52	January 23	Nashville	2–1	Vancouver		Luongo	18,910	26–17–9	61	Recap
53	January 26	Phoenix	4–5	Vancouver	OT	Luongo	18,910	27–17–9	63	Recap
54	January 27	Edmonton	4–2	Vancouver		Luongo	18,910	27–18–9	63	Recap
55	January 29	Chicago	5–2	Vancouver		Luongo	18,910	27–19–9	63	Recap
56	January 31	Vancouver	3–4	Winnipeg		Lack	15,004	27–20–9	63	Recap

February: 1–4–1 (Home: 1–0–1; Road: 0–4–0)
#	Date	Visitor	Score	Home	OT	Decision	Attendance	Record	Pts	Recap
57	February 3	Vancouver	0–2	Detroit		Lack	20,066	27–21–9	63	Recap
58	February 4	Vancouver	1–3	Boston		Luongo	17,565	27–22–9	63	Recap
59	February 6	Vancouver	2–5	Montreal		Luongo	21,273	27–23–9	63	Recap
60	February 8	Vancouver	1–3	Toronto		Luongo	19,662	27–24–9	63	Recap
61	February 26	St. Louis	0–1	Vancouver		Lack	18,910	28–24–9	65	Recap
62	February 28	Minnesota	2–1	Vancouver	SO	Lack	18,910	28–24–10	66	Recap

March: 6–7–1 (Home: 3–3–0; Road: 3–4–1)
#	Date	Visitor	Score	Home	OT	Decision	Attendance	Record	Pts	Recap
63	March 2	Ottawa	4–2	Vancouver		Lack	54,194 (outdoors)	28–25–10	66	Recap
64	March 4	Vancouver	0–1	Phoenix		Lack	13,449	28–26–10	66	Recap
65	March 6	Vancouver	1–6	Dallas		Lack	14,634	28–27–10	66	Recap
66	March 8	Calgary	1–2	Vancouver		Lack	18,910	29–27–10	68	Recap
67	March 10	NY Islanders	7–4	Vancouver		Lack	18,910	29–28–10	68	Recap
68	March 12	Vancouver	3–2	Winnipeg	SO	Lack	15,004	30–28–10	70	Recap
69	March 14	Vancouver	3–4	Washington		Lack	18,506	30–29–10	70	Recap
70	March 16	Vancouver	4–3	Florida	SO	Lack	14,215	31–29–10	72	Recap
71	March 17	Vancouver	3–4	Tampa Bay		Lack	19,204	31–30–10	72	Recap
72	March 19	Nashville	0–2	Vancouver		Lack	18,910	32–30–10	74	Recap
73	March 23	Buffalo	2–4	Vancouver		Lack	18,910	33–30–10	76	Recap
74	March 26	Vancouver	5–2	Minnesota		Lack	19,014	34–30–10	78	Recap
75	March 27	Vancouver	2–3	Colorado	OT	Lack	19,014	34–30–11	79	Recap
76	March 29	Anaheim	5–1	Vancouver		Lack	18,910	34–31–11	79	Recap

April: 2–4–0 (Home: 2–3–0; Road: 0–1–0)
#	Date	Visitor	Score	Home	OT	Decision	Attendance	Record	Pts	Recap
77	April 1	NY Rangers	3–1	Vancouver		Lack	18,910	34–32–11	79	Recap
78	April 5	Los Angeles	1–2	Vancouver		Lack	18,910	35–32–11	81	Recap
79	April 7	Anaheim	3–0	Vancouver		Lack	18,910	35–33–11	81	Recap
80	April 10	Colorado	4–2	Vancouver		Markstrom	18,910	35–34–11	81	Recap
81	April 12	Vancouver	2–5	Edmonton		Markstrom	16,839	35–35–11	81	Recap
82	April 13	Calgary	1–5	Vancouver		Markstrom	18,910	36–35–11	83	Recap

Legend: Win (2 points) Loss (0 points) Overtime/shootout loss (1 point)

=== Detailed records ===
Western Conference
Central Division
Opponent	Home	Away	Total	Pts.	Goals scored	Goals allowed
Chicago Blackhawks	0–2–0	1–0–0	1–2–0	2	6	9
Colorado Avalanche	1–1–0	0–0–1	1–1–1	3	7	8
Dallas Stars	0–1–0	0–2–0	0–3–0	0	3	12
Minnesota Wild	0–0–1	1–0–1	1–0–2	4	8	7
Nashville Predators	1–1–0	1–0–0	2–1–0	4	4	3
St. Louis Blues	2–0–0	1–0–0	3–0–0	6	6	3
Winnipeg Jets	1–0–0	1–1–0	2–1–0	4	8	7
Total	5–5–1	5–3–2	10–8–3	23	42	49
Pacific Division
Opponent	Home	Away	Total	Pts.	Goals scored	Goals allowed
Anaheim Ducks	0–2–0	0–2–1	0–4–1	1	6	24
Calgary Flames	3–0–0	2–0–0	5–0–0	10	17	8
Edmonton Oilers	2–1–0	1–1–0	3–2–0	6	16	12
Los Angeles Kings	1–0–1	0–3–0	1–3–1	3	5	13
Phoenix Coyotes	2–0–0	0–2–1	2–2–1	5	10	11
San Jose Sharks	0–1–1	1–1–0	1–2–1	3	7	12
Vancouver Canucks	–	–	–	–	–	–
Total	8–4–2	4–9–2	12–13–4	28	61	80

Eastern Conference
Atlantic Division
Opponent	Home	Away	Total	Pts.	Goals scored	Goals allowed
Boston Bruins	1–0–0	0–1–0	1–1–0	2	7	5
Buffalo Sabres	1–0–0	1–0–0	2–0–0	4	7	2
Detroit Red Wings	0–1–0	0–1–0	0–2–0	0	1	4
Florida Panthers	0–0–1	1–0–0	1–0–1	3	6	6
Montreal Canadiens	0–1–0	0–1–0	0–2–0	0	3	9
Ottawa Senators	0–1–0	1–0–0	1–1–0	2	7	6
Tampa Bay Lightning	0–1–0	0–1–0	0–2–0	0	5	8
Toronto Maple Leafs	1–0–0	0–1–0	1–1–0	2	5	3
Total	3–4–1	3–5–0	6–9–1	13	41	43
Metropolitan Division
Opponent	Home	Away	Total	Pts.	Goals scored	Goals allowed
Carolina Hurricanes	1–0–0	1–0–0	2–0–0	4	5	2
Columbus Blue Jackets	1–0–0	0–1–0	1–1–0	2	7	5
New Jersey Devils	1–0–0	1–0–0	2–0–0	4	6	4
New York Islanders	0–1–0	1–0–0	1–1–0	2	9	11
New York Rangers	0–1–0	0–1–0	0–2–0	0	3	8
Philadelphia Flyers	0–0–1	1–0–0	1–0–1	3	6	6
Pittsburgh Penguins	0–0–1	0–0–1	0–0–2	2	7	9
Washington Capitals	1–0–0	0–1–0	1–1–0	2	6	6
Total	4–2–2	4–3–1	8–5–3	19	48	51

== Player statistics ==
=== Skaters ===
Final stats

Regular season

Player	GP	G	A	Pts	+/-	PIM
Henrik Sedin	70	11	39	50	+3	42
Daniel Sedin	73	16	31	47	0	38
Ryan Kesler	77	25	18	43	−15	81
Chris Higgins	78	17	22	39	−14	30
Jason Garrison	81	7	26	33	−5	57
Zack Kassian	73	14	15	29	−4	124
Mike Santorelli	49	10	18	28	+9	6
Kevin Bieksa	76	4	20	24	−8	104
Brad Richardson	73	11	12	23	+1	39
Alexander Edler	63	7	15	22	−39	50
Dan Hamhuis	79	5	17	22	+13	26
Jannik Hansen	71	11	9	20	−9	43
David Booth	66	9	10	19	+1	18
Christopher Tanev	64	6	11	17	+12	8
Ryan Stanton	64	1	15	16	+5	32
Alex Burrows	49	5	10	15	−9	71
Dale Weise^{‡}	44	3	9	12	−1	42
Yannick Weber	49	6	4	10	−7	16
Tom Sestito	77	5	4	9	−14	213
Zac Dalpe	55	4	3	7	−7	6
Shawn Matthias^{†}	18	3	4	7	−3	12
Nicklas Jensen	17	3	3	6	−1	10
Jordan Schroeder	25	3	3	6	−7	2
Darren Archibald	16	1	2	3	+1	0
Raphael Diaz^{‡}	6	1	1	2	−3	0
Kellan Lain	9	1	0	1	+1	21
Frank Corrado	15	1	0	1	−2	4
Jeremy Welsh	19	1	0	1	−1	6
Mike Zalewski	2	0	1	1	+2	0
Benn Ferriero	2	0	0	0	0	0
Pascal Pelletier	3	0	0	0	0	0
Yann Sauve	3	0	0	0	−2	0
Andrew Alberts	10	0	0	0	+1	0
Totals	82	191	322	513	−102	1,101

=== Goaltenders ===
Stats updated as of March 2, 2014

Regular season
Player	GP	GS	TOI	W	L	OT	GA	GAA	SA	SV%	SO	G	A	PIM
Roberto Luongo^{‡}	42	42	2,418:02	19	16	6	96	2.38	1,157	.917	3	0	0	0
Eddie Lack	41	37	2,318:52	16	17	5	93	2.41	1,052	.912	4	0	0	0
Jacob Markstrom^{†}	4	3	199:34	1	2	0	10	3.01	76	.868	0	0	0	0
Joacim Eriksson	1	0	36:02	0	0	0	6	9.99	31	.806	0	0	0	0
Totals		82	4,972:30	36	35	11	205	2.47	2,316	.911	7	0	0	0

^{†}Traded to Canucks mid-season. Stats reflect time with Canucks only.
^{‡}Traded to another team mid-season. Stats reflect time with Canucks only.
Bold/italics denotes franchise record.

== Awards and honours ==
=== Awards ===
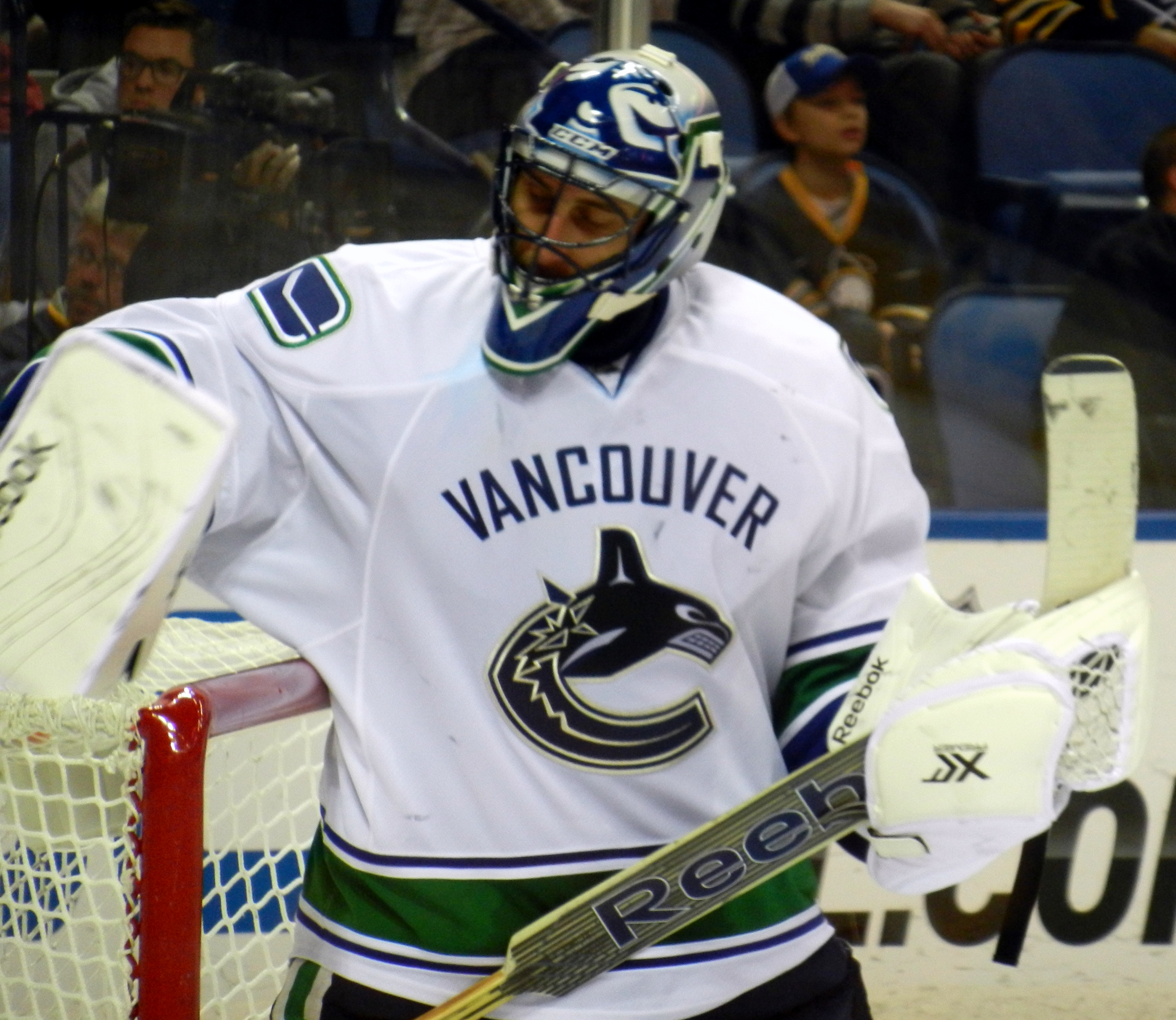
Roberto Luongo was named the NHL Third Star of the Week for the week ending December 8, 2013.

Player	Award	Ref
Ryan Kesler	NHL Third Star of the Week (week ending October 27, 2013)	
Roberto Luongo	NHL Third Star of the Week (week ending December 8, 2013)	
Team awards
Ryan Kesler	Cyclone Taylor Trophy (team MVP)	
Eddie Lack	Fred J. Hume Award (unsung hero)	
Dan Hamhuis	Babe Pratt Trophy (best defenceman)	
Zack Kassian	Pavel Bure Most Exciting Player Award	
Henrik Sedin	Cyrus H. McLean Trophy (leading point-scorer)	

=== Milestones ===
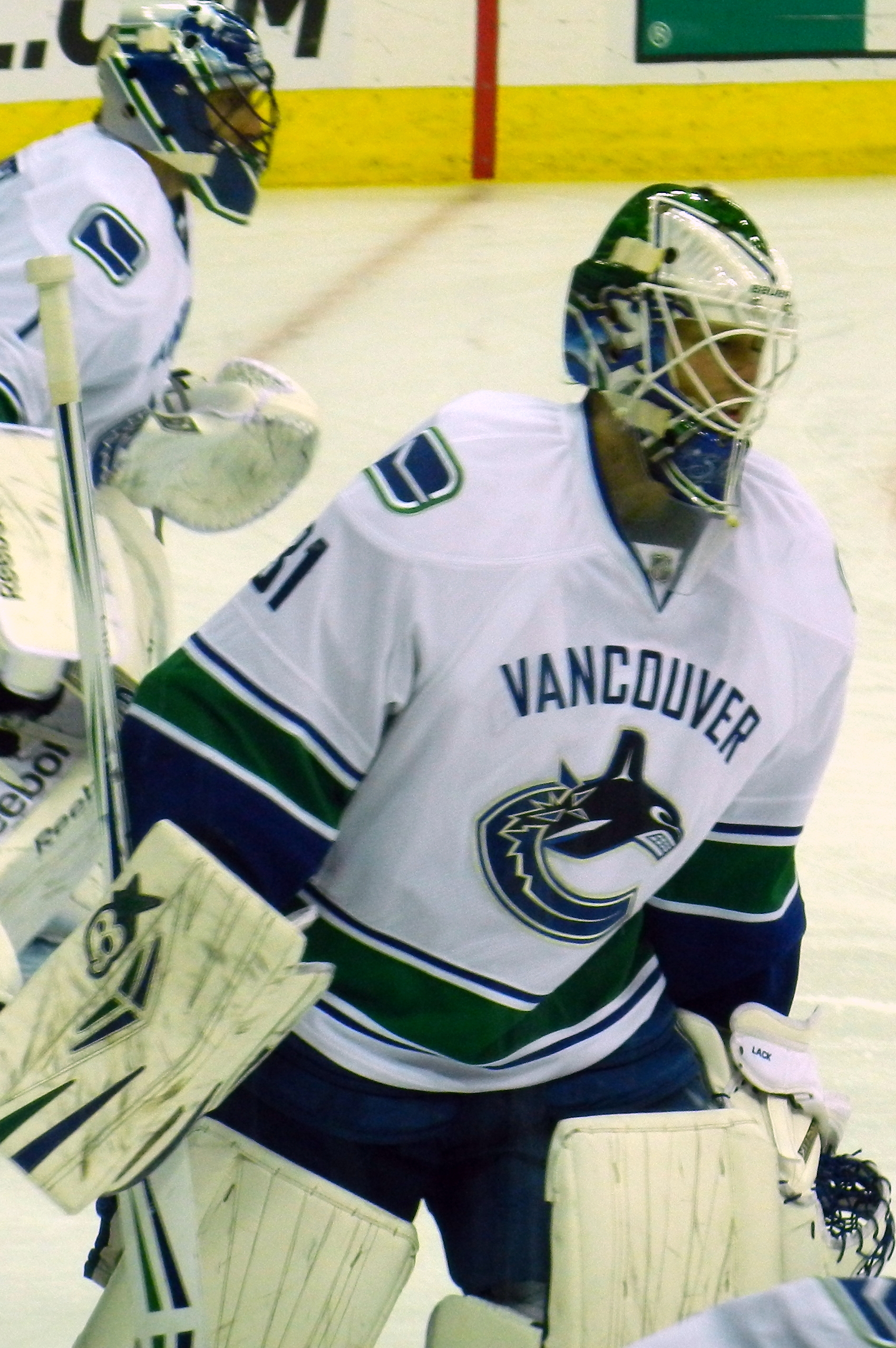
Eddie Lack played in his first career game and recorded his first win and shutout during the season.

Player	Milestone	Date	Ref
Ryan Stanton	1st NHL point 1st NHL assist	October 6, 2013	
David Booth	200th NHL point	October 6, 2013	
Dan Hamhuis	200th NHL assist	October 6, 2013	
Eddie Lack	1st NHL game 1st NHL start 1st NHL win	October 6, 2013	
Henrik Sedin	800th NHL point	October 15, 2013	
Christopher Tanev	100th NHL game	October 17, 2013	
Ryan Stanton	1st NHL goal	October 17, 2013	
Brad Richardson	400th NHL game	October 19, 2013	
Darren Archibald	1st NHL game	October 25, 2013	
Darren Archibald	1st NHL point 1st NHL assist	November 2, 2013	
Ryan Kesler	600th NHL game	November 17, 2013	
Zack Kassian	100th NHL game	November 17, 2013	
Jeremy Welsh	1st NHL goal	November 22, 2013	
Ryan Kesler	200th NHL assist	November 22, 2013	
Dan Hamhuis	700th NHL game	November 22, 2013	
Daniel Sedin	300th NHL goal	November 28, 2013	
Eddie Lack	1st NHL shutout	December 9, 2013	
David Booth	400 NHL game	December 14, 2013	
Kevin Bieksa	500th NHL game	December 22, 2013	
David Booth	100th NHL assist	December 22, 2013	
Jason Garrison	100th NHL point	January 8, 2014	
Tom Sestito	100th NHL game	January 10, 2014	
Joacim Eriksson	1st NHL game	January 15, 2014	
Kellan Lain	1st NHL game	January 18, 2014	
Kellan Lain	1st NHL goal 1st NHL point	January 21, 2014	
Alex Burrows	600th NHL game	March 2, 2014	
Darren Archibald	1st NHL goal	March 8, 2014	
Nicklas Jensen	1st NHL point 1st NHL assist	March 10, 2014	
Henrik Sedin	1,000 NHL game	March 12, 2014	
Nicklas Jensen	1st NHL goal	March 14, 2014	
Daniel Sedin	800th NHL point	March 27, 2014	
Mike Zalewski	1st NHL game	April 12, 2014	
Frank Corrado	1st NHL goal 1st NHL point	April 13, 2014	
Mike Zalewski	1st NHL assist 1st NHL point	April 13, 2014	

=== Records ===
Player	Record	Date	Ref
Kellan Lain	Fastest fight to start an NHL career (two seconds)	January 18, 2014	
Eddie Lack	Canucks rookie record for most shutouts (3)	February 28, 2014	
Eddie Lack	Canucks rookie record for most consecutive starts (19) shared with Corey Hirsch	April 7, 2014	

== Transactions ==
The Canucks have been involved in the following transactions during the 2013–14 season:

=== Trades ===
Date	Details
June 30, 2013	To Vancouver Canucks: 1st-round pick in 2013 (9th overall)	To New Jersey Devils: Cory Schneider
September 28, 2013	To Vancouver Canucks: Zac Dalpe; Jeremy Welsh	To Carolina Hurricanes: Kellan Tochkin; 4th-round pick in 2014
February 3, 2014	To Vancouver Canucks: Raphael Diaz	To Montreal Canadiens: Dale Weise
March 4, 2014	To Vancouver Canucks: Jeff Costello	To Ottawa Senators: Patrick Mullen
March 4, 2014	To Vancouver Canucks: Shawn Matthias; Jacob Markstrom	To Florida Panthers: Steven Anthony; Roberto Luongo
March 5, 2014	To Vancouver Canucks: 5th-round pick in 2015 (149th overall)	To New York Rangers: Raphael Diaz

=== Free agents acquired ===
Player	Former team	Contract terms (in U.S. dollars)	Ref
Yannick Weber	Montreal Canadiens	1 year, $650,000	
Brad Richardson	Los Angeles Kings	2 years, $2.3 million	
Alex Biega	Buffalo Sabres	1 year, $600,000	
Mike Santorelli	Winnipeg Jets	1 year, $550,000	
Benn Ferriero	New York Rangers	1 year, $550,000	
Brandon DeFazio	New York Islanders	1 year, $550,000	
Zach Hamill	Florida Panthers	1 year, $550,000	
Colin Stuart	Iserlohn Roosters	1 year, $550,000	
Pascal Pelletier	SCL Tigers	1 year, $550,000	

=== Free agents lost ===
Player	New team	Contract terms (in U.S. dollars)	Ref
Keith Ballard	Minnesota Wild	2 years, $3 million	
Guillaume Desbiens	Colorado Avalanche	1 year, $600,000	
Maxim Lapierre	St. Louis Blues	2 years, $2.2 million	
Andrew Ebbett	Pittsburgh Penguins	2 years, $1.1 million	
Derek Roy	St. Louis Blues	1 year, $4 million	
Andrew Gordon	Winnipeg Jets	1 year, $550,000	
Steve Pinizzotto	Florida Panthers	1 year, $650,000	
Mason Raymond	Toronto Maple Leafs	1 year, $1 million	
Manny Malhotra	Carolina Hurricanes	1 year, $600,000	

=== Claimed via waivers ===
Player	Previous team	Date	Ref
Ryan Stanton	Chicago Blackhawks	September 30, 2013	

=== Player signings ===
Player	Date	Contract terms (in U.S. dollars)	Ref
Kellan Lain	July 18, 2013	2-year, $1,200,000 contract extension	
Yann Sauve	July 24, 2013	1 year, $708,750 contract extension	
Jordan Schroeder	July 24, 2013	1 year, $600,000 contract extension	
Dale Weise	July 24, 2013	1 year, $750,000 contract extension	
Ronalds Kenins	July 30, 2013	2-year, $1,360,000 entry level contract	
Bo Horvat	August 6, 2013	3-year, $2,775,000 entry-level contract	
Hunter Shinkaruk	August 6, 2013	3-year, $2,775,000 entry-level contract	
Darren Archibald	August 6, 2013	1 year, $660,000 contract extension	
Christopher Tanev	August 22, 2013	1 year, $1,500,000 contract extension	
Andrew Alberts	August 22, 2013	1 year, $600,000 contract extension	
Jannik Hansen	September 29, 2013	4-year, $10,000,000 contract extension	
Daniel Sedin	November 1, 2013	4-year, $28,000,000 contract extension	
Henrik Sedin	November 1, 2013	4-year, $28,000,000 contract extension	
Eddie Lack	November 15, 2013	2-year, $2,300,000 contract extension	
Cole Cassels	December 4, 2013	3-year, $1,952,500 entry-level contract	
Dane Fox	December 28, 2013	3-year, $2,492,500 entry-level contract	
Mike Zalewski	March 14, 2014	2-year, $1,850,000 entry-level contract	
Anton Cederholm	May 20, 2014	3-year, $1,900,000 entry-level contract	

== Draft picks ==
The 2013 NHL entry draft was held on June 30, 2013, at the Prudential Center in Newark, New Jersey. The Canucks had the following picks:

Round	#	Player	Pos	Nationality	College/Junior/Club team (League)
1	9^{[a]}	Bo Horvat	C	Canada	London Knights (OHL)
1	24	Hunter Shinkaruk	LW	Canada	Medicine Hat Tigers (WHL)
3	85^{[b]}	Cole Cassels	C	United States	Oshawa Generals (OHL)
4	115	Jordan Subban	D	Canada	Belleville Bulls (OHL)
5	145	Anton Cederholm	D	Sweden	Rögle BK (SHL)
6	175	Mike Williamson	D	Canada	Spruce Grove Saints (AJHL)
7	205	Miles Liberati	D	United States	London Knights (OHL)

Draft notes

- ^{a} New Jersey's first-round pick went to Vancouver, as the result of a trade on June 30, 2013, that sent Cory Schneider to New Jersey, in exchange for this pick.
- Vancouver's second-round pick went to the Dallas Stars as the result of a trade on April 2, 2013, that sent Derek Roy to the Canucks, in exchange for Kevin Connauton and this pick.
- ^{b} Vancouver's third-round pick went to the Florida Panthers, and was later sent back to Vancouver, as a result of the following trades:
  - On February 28, 2011, the Canucks acquired Chris Higgins from the Florida Panthers, in exchange for Evan Oberg and this pick.
  - On October 22, 2011, the Canucks acquired David Booth, Steven Reinprecht, and their original third-round pick from the Florida Panthers, in exchange for Mikael Samuelsson and Marco Sturm.

=== 2014 draft ===
The team's finish in the 2013–14 season allowed them to select sixth overall at the 2014 Entry Draft. This was the lowest the Canucks had selected since 1999 when the team had the second and third picks and selected Daniel and Henrick Sedin.

== Notes ==
1: The NHL uses a point system for their standings that awards two points for a win and one point an overtime or shootout loss. The denotation of a team's record is wins-losses-overtime/shootout losses.
