= 2014 NHL Heritage Classic =

Outdoor National Hockey League game

2014 Heritage Classic
| | 1 | 2 | 3 | Total |
|---|---|---|---|---|
| Ottawa Senators | 2 | 1 | 1 | 4 |
| Vancouver Canucks | 2 | 0 | 0 | 2 |
- Date: March 2, 2014
- Venue: BC Place
- City: Vancouver
- Attendance: 54,194

The 2014 NHL Heritage Classic was an outdoor regular season National Hockey League (NHL) game held indoor, part of the Heritage Classic series of outdoor NHL ice hockey games in Canada. It took place on March 2, 2014, in BC Place in Vancouver, British Columbia, Canada, with the Ottawa Senators facing off against the home team Canucks. It is the first "outdoor" game to be played in what technically is an indoor stadium, albeit one of a larger capacity than a typical NHL arena; BC Place is a retractable roof venue, and it is unknown if the stadium has the capabilities to keep its roof open during inclement weather (several stadiums of the type explicitly cannot be kept open in such an environment due to drainage concerns). The game was televised nationally in Canada on CBC and nationally in the United States on NBCSN.

It was announced hours before the game that the roof of BC Place would be closed for the duration of the game due to weather concerns.

The 2014 NHL Heritage Classic was also the last game to feature Roberto Luongo as a player for Vancouver, and is to date the only outdoor game the Canucks have played

== Game summary ==
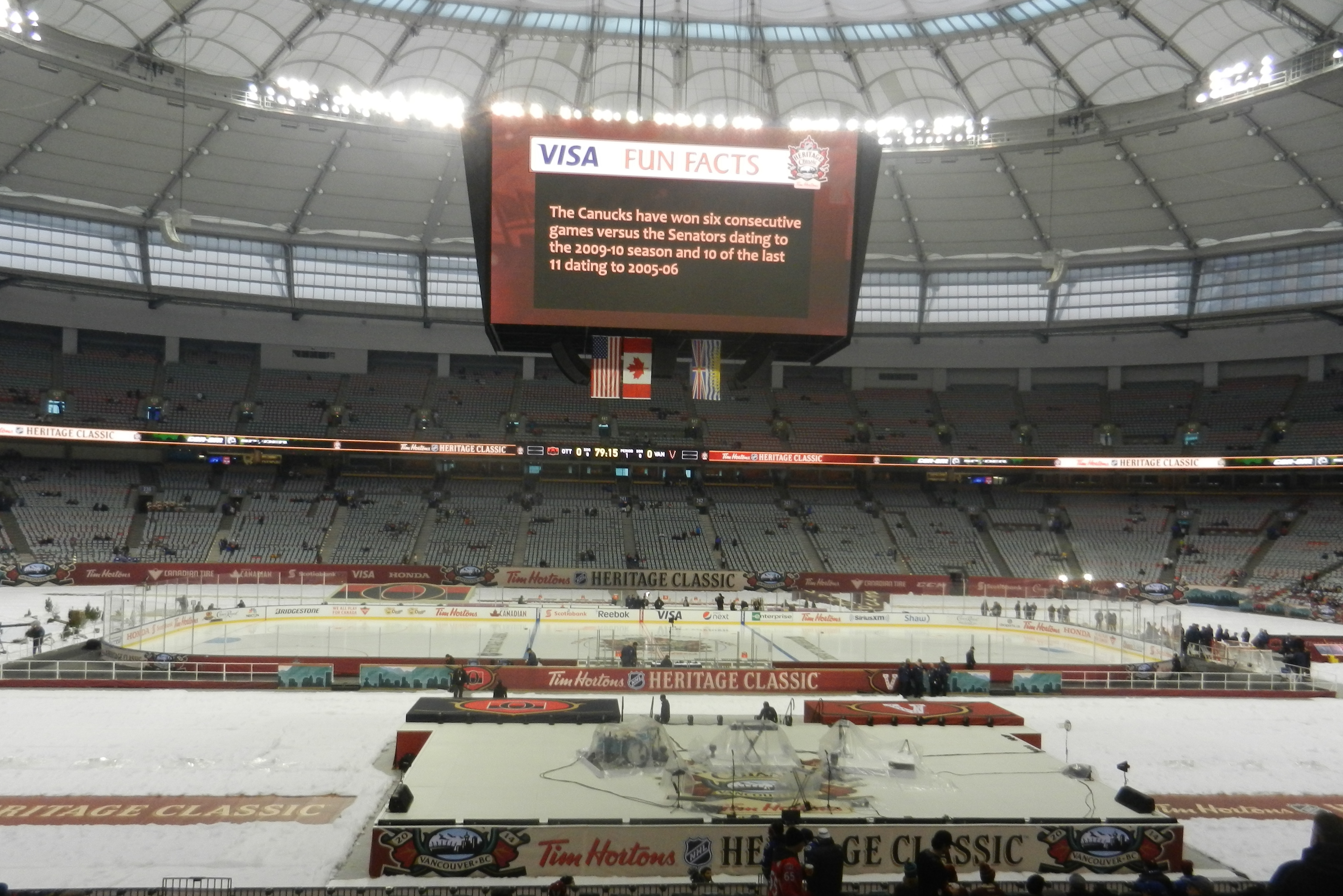
The rink inside BC Place before pregame warmups

| March 2, 2014 | Ottawa Senators | 4–2 | Vancouver Canucks | BC Place | Recap |

The Canucks built a 2–0 lead in the first period with goals by Jason Garrison and Zack Kassian. The Senators then scored four unanswered goals by Clarke MacArthur, Erik Karlsson, Cody Ceci, and Colin Greening to win the game. The loss left Vancouver head coach John Tortorella answering questions during the post game press conference about why he started Eddie Lack in goal instead of regular starter Roberto Luongo. Tortorella's decision was also unpopular with the crowd during the game as they booed Lack, while Luongo was also unhappy as he had been looking forward to that game all season. Two days later on March 4, a day before the NHL trade deadline, Luongo was traded to the Florida Panthers.

Scoring summary
| Period | Team | Goal | Assist(s) | Time | Score |
|---|---|---|---|---|---|
| 1st | VAN | Jason Garrison (7) – pp | Dan Hamhuis (12) and Jannik Hansen (6) | 04:54 | 1–0 VAN |
| 1st | VAN | Zack Kassian (11) | Unassisted | 11:27 | 2–0 VAN |
| 1st | OTT | Clarke MacArthur (19) | Erik Condra (8) and Eric Gryba (8) | 15:15 | 2–1 VAN |
| 1st | OTT | Erik Karlsson (16) – pp | Clarke MacArthur (25) | 17:03 | 2–2 |
| 2nd | OTT | Cody Ceci (2) | Jason Spezza (31) and Milan Michalek (16) | 10:11 | 3–2 OTT |
| 3rd | OTT | Colin Greening (6) – en | Chris Neil (4) and Zack Smith (7) | 18:27 | 4–2 OTT |

Number in parentheses represents the player's total in goals or assists to that point of the season

Penalty summary
| Period | Team | Player | Penalty | Time | PIM |
|---|---|---|---|---|---|
| 1st | OTT | Colin Greening | High-sticking | 03:17 | 2:00 |
| 1st | OTT | Chris Neil | High-sticking | 08:44 | 2:00 |
| 1st | VAN | Ryan Stanton | Tripping | 16:03 | 2:00 |
| 2nd | OTT | Eric Gryba | Hooking | 05:29 | 2:00 |
| 2nd | VAN | Jannik Hansen | Embellishment | 05:29 | 2:00 |
| 2nd | VAN | Zack Kassian | Roughing | 15:09 | 2:00 |
| 3rd | OTT | Chris Neil | Unsportsmanlike conduct | 01:41 | 2:00 |
| 3rd | VAN | Tom Sestito | Unsportsmanlike conduct | 01:41 | 2:00 |
| 3rd | VAN | Alex Burrows | Roughing | 05:38 | 2:00 |
| 3rd | OTT | Chris Phillips | Roughing | 05:38 | 2:00 |
| 3rd | OTT | Eric Gryba | High-sticking | 14:11 | 2:00 |
| 3rd | VAN | Brad Richardson | Tripping | 15:47 | 2:00 |

Shots by period
| Team | 1 | 2 | 3 | Total |
|---|---|---|---|---|
| Ottawa | 10 | 12 | 6 | 28 |
| Vancouver | 12 | 8 | 11 | 31 |

Power play opportunities
| Team | Goals/Opportunities |
|---|---|
| Ottawa | 1/3 |
| Vancouver | 1/3 |

Three star selections
| | Team | Player | Statistics |
|---|---|---|---|
| 1st | OTT | Clarke MacArthur | 1 goal, 1 assist |
| 2nd | VAN | Ryan Kesler | 4 shots, 4 hits |
| 3rd | OTT | Erik Karlsson | 1 goal |

== Team rosters ==
Ottawa Senators
| # | | Player | Position |
|---|---|---|---|
| 3 | (Canada) | Marc Methot | D |
| 4 | (Canada) | Chris Phillips (A) | D |
| 5 | (Canada) | Cody Ceci | D |
| 6 | (United States) | Bobby Ryan | RW |
| 7 | (Canada) | Kyle Turris | C |
| 9 | (Czech Republic) | Milan Michalek | LW |
| 14 | (Canada) | Colin Greening | C |
| 15 | (Canada) | Zack Smith | C |
| 16 | (Canada) | Clarke MacArthur | LW |
| 19 | (Canada) | Jason Spezza (C) | C |
| 22 | (United States) | Erik Condra | RW |
| 25 | (Canada) | Chris Neil (A) | RW |
| 40 | (Sweden) | Robin Lehner | G |
| 41 | (United States) | Craig Anderson | G |
| 46 | (Canada) | Patrick Wiercioch | D |
| 62 | (Canada) | Eric Gryba | D |
| 65 | (Sweden) | Erik Karlsson | D |
| 68 | (Canada) | Mike Hoffman | C |
| 89 | (Canada) | Cory Conacher | LW |
| 93 | (Sweden) | Mika Zibanejad | C |
Head coach: (Canada) Paul MacLean

Vancouver Canucks
| # | | Player | Position |
|---|---|---|---|
| 1 | (Canada) | Roberto Luongo | G |
| 2 | (Canada) | Dan Hamhuis | D |
| 3 | (Canada) | Kevin Bieksa (A) | D |
| 5 | (Canada) | Jason Garrison | D |
| 7 | (United States) | David Booth | LW |
| 8 | (Canada) | Chris Tanev | D |
| 9 | (Canada) | Zack Kassian | RW |
| 14 | (Canada) | Alex Burrows | LW |
| 15 | (Canada) | Brad Richardson | RW |
| 17 | (United States) | Ryan Kesler | C |
| 18 | (Canada) | Ryan Stanton | D |
| 20 | (United States) | Chris Higgins | LW |
| 21 | (Canada) | Zac Dalpe | C |
| 22 | (Sweden) | Daniel Sedin (A) | LW |
| 23 | (Sweden) | Alexander Edler | D |
| 24 | (Switzerland) | Raphael Diaz | D |
| 29 | (United States) | Tom Sestito | LW |
| 31 | (Sweden) | Eddie Lack | G |
| 33 | (Sweden) | Henrik Sedin (C) | C |
| 36 | (Denmark) | Jannik Hansen | RW |
Head coach: (United States) John Tortorella

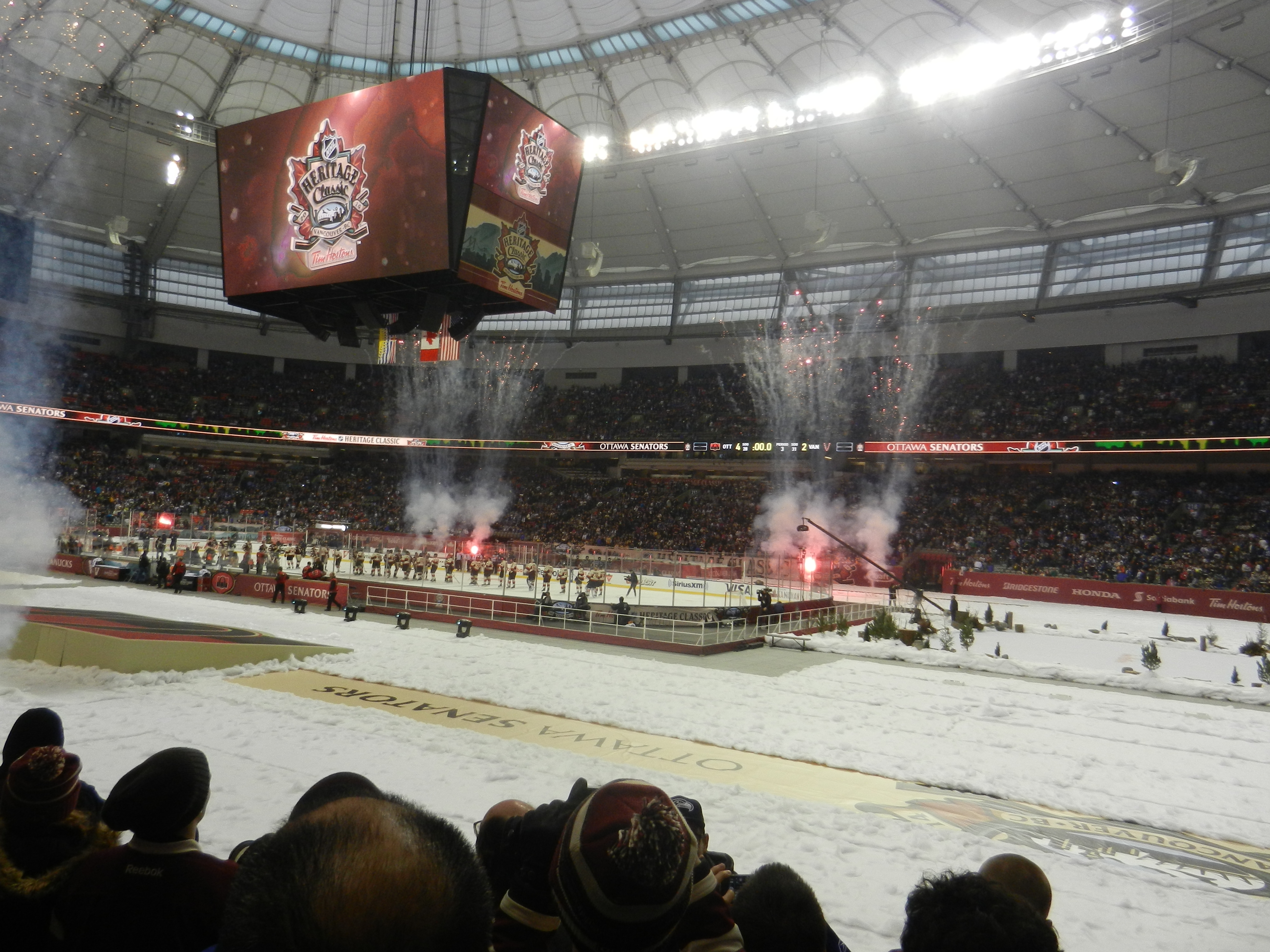
Fireworks were set-off at the conclusion of the game

=== Scratches ===
- Ottawa Senators: Jared Cowen, Matt Kassian, Joe Corvo
- Vancouver Canucks: Yannick Weber, Jordan Schroeder

=== Officials ===
- Referees — Steve Kozari, Tom Kowal
- Linesmen — Brad Lazarowich, Michel Cormier

== National Anthem ==
The Canadian national anthem was sung by singer-songwriter Sarah McLachlan accompanied by the Sarah McLachlan School Of Music Choir.

== See also ==
- 2014 NHL Stadium Series
