= Cody Goloubef =

Canadian ice hockey player (born 1989)

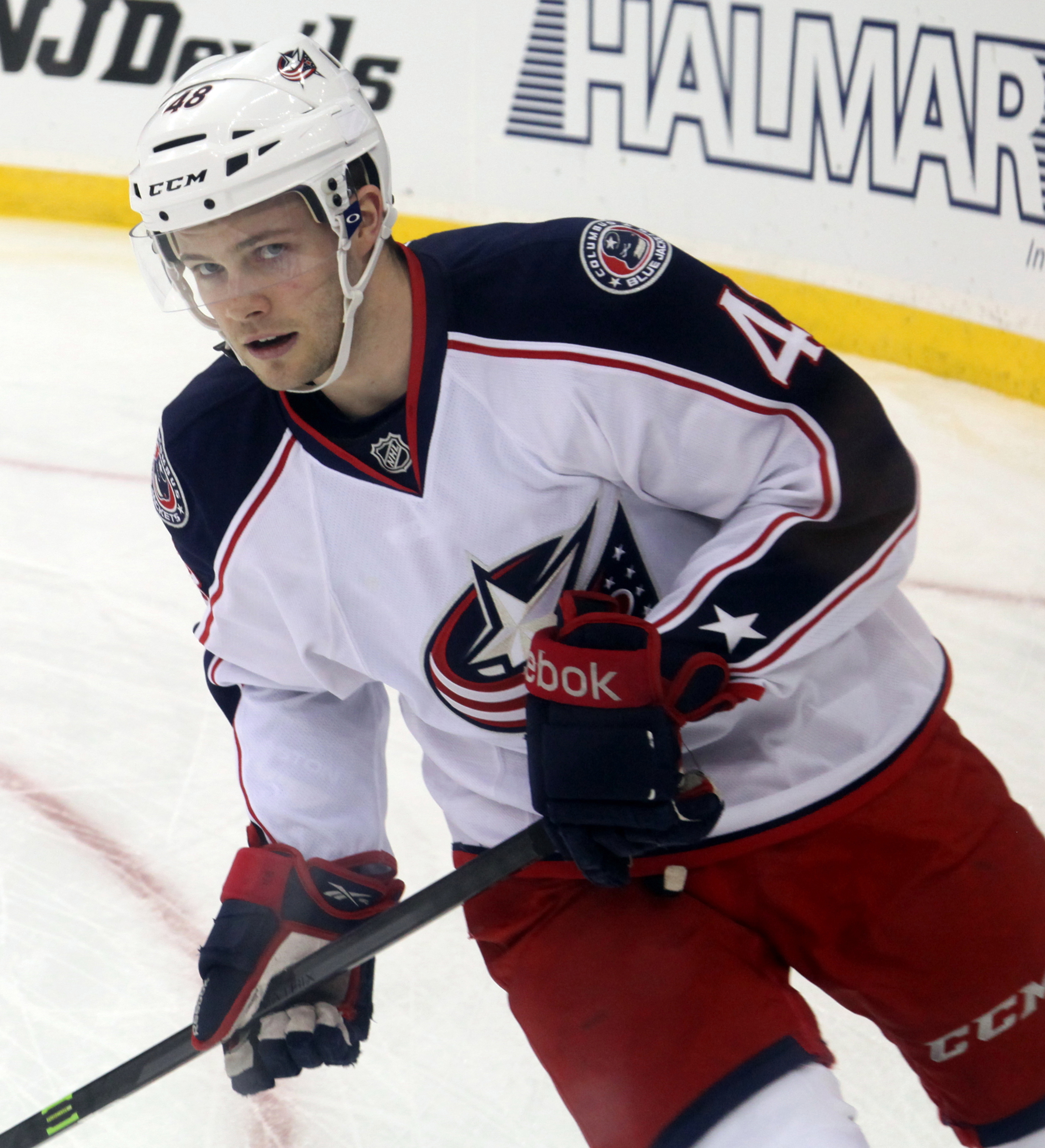
- Goloubef with the Columbus Blue Jackets in 2014
- Born: November 30, 1989 (age 36) Oakville, Ontario, Canada
- Height: 6 ft 1 in (185 cm)
- Weight: 194 lb (88 kg; 13 st 12 lb)
- Position: Defence
- Shot: Right
- Played for: Columbus Blue Jackets; Colorado Avalanche; Ottawa Senators; Detroit Red Wings; SC Bern
- National team: Canada
- NHL draft: 37th overall, 2008; Columbus Blue Jackets
- Playing career: 2010–2023

Cody Goloubef (born November 30, 1989) is a Canadian former professional ice hockey defenceman. Goloubef was selected by the Columbus Blue Jackets in the second round, 37th overall, of the 2008 NHL entry draft. Goloubef was selected to represent Canada at the 2018 Winter Olympics in Pyeongchang.

== Playing career ==
=== Amateur ===
Goloubef first played minor midget hockey from 2003 to 2005 with the Toronto Marlboros in the Greater Toronto Minor Midget Hockey League. Despite his selection in the 2005 OHL Priority Selection, by the Sarnia Sting, Goloubef opted to pursue an American collegiate career en route to his path to the NHL. Playing two seasons in the Ontario Provincial Junior Hockey League with the Milton Icehawks and Oakville Blades in order to retain his collegiate eligibility, he committed to the University of Wisconsin-Madison of the Western Collegiate Hockey Association.

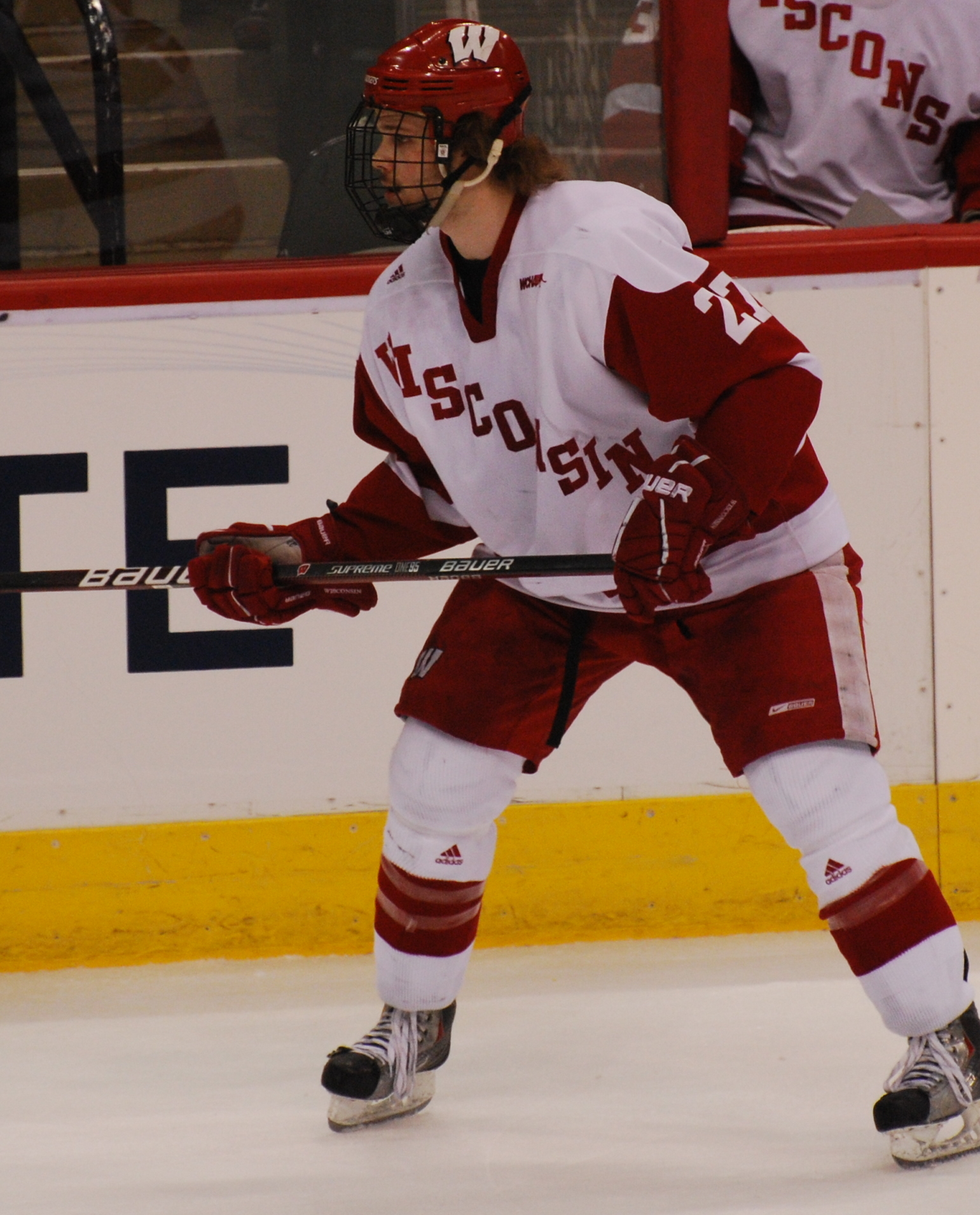
Goloubef playing for the Wisconsin Badgers in the 2010 NCAA Division I Men's Ice Hockey West Regional Final

In his freshman season with the Badgers in 2007–08, Goloubef established himself as a regular on the blueline in contributing with 4 goals and 10 points in 40 games. Over the off-season, he was selected by the Columbus Blue Jackets in the second round, 37th overall, in the 2008 NHL entry draft. He played two more seasons of NCAA Division I hockey with the Badgers, announcing the end of his college career after helping Wisconsin to the NCAA Championship Game in his junior 2009–10 season.

=== Professional ===
On April 29, 2010, the Columbus Blue Jackets signed Goloubef to a three-year, entry-level contract. He was assigned by the Blue Jackets to play his first professional season in the American Hockey League with affiliate, the Springfield Falcons in the 2010–11 season. He made his debut in the season opener against the Charlotte Checkers on October 10, 2010. He completed the season, having appeared in 50 games with the Falcons, placing third on the blueline with 5 goals and notching 17 points.

In his second season with the Falcons, Goloubef was hampered from injury to appear in 48 games for 12 points. He was recalled in the final stages of the 2011–12 season by the Blue Jackets and made his NHL debut against the St. Louis Blues on March 31, 2012. During the final season of his rookie contract, Goloubef again spent time between the Blue Jackets and Falcons, appearing in 11 games and scoring his first career NHL goal, a game-winner, on February 11, 2013, in a victory over the San Jose Sharks.

On July 25, 2013, Goloubef was retained by the Blue Jackets after accepting his qualifying offer. Spending the majority of the 2013–14 season in the AHL with the Falcons, Goloubef thrust into a top four role, compiled his best offensive numbers with 28 points in 62 games. He was the Falcons' selection to the All-Star Game and featured in 5 games in Columbus.

On May 28, 2015, Goloubef was re-signed by the Blue Jackets to a one-way, two-year contract. In the 2015–16 season, his spent his first full year in the NHL with the Blue Jackets. While often a healthy scratch, he appeared in a career best 43 games as the club's rotating depth/reserve defenseman.

Having struggled to make an impact in his previous 6 seasons with the Blue Jackets, Goloubef continued the theme into the final year of his contract by missing parts of the pre-season to the start of the 2016–17 season, due to an oblique injury. After clearing waivers in October and having been surpassed the depth chart, Goloubef was reassigned to the Cleveland Monsters of the AHL. He appeared in 16 games before on he was traded by the Blue Jackets to the Colorado Avalanche in exchange for Ryan Stanton on November 28, 2016. He was initially assigned to remain in the AHL with the San Antonio Rampage appearing in 2 games before he was recalled to the Avalanche by former head coach with the Falcons, Jared Bednar. He made his Avalanche debut on December 6, 2016, against the Nashville Predators. With Colorado anchored to the bottom of the league, Goloubef remained with the club for the remainder of the season, recording his first points, two assists, with the Avalanche, in a 6–3 defeat to the Calgary Flames. Used in a depth role, Goloubef appeared in 38 games to finish with 5 assists.

On September 5, 2017, the Buffalo Sabres signed Goloubef to a professional tryout (PTO) to attend the team's training camp. He was released on September 30. He agreed to terms on an AHL contract with the Stockton Heat of the AHL. On February 25, 2018, Goloubef agreed to a two-way contract for the remainder of the 2017–18 season with parent NHL affiliate the Calgary Flames. He played out the season with the Heat, producing 20 points in 46 games from the blueline.

On July 1, 2018, Goloubef as a free agent secured a one-year, two-way contract worth $650,000 with the Boston Bruins. He was assigned to AHL affiliate, the Providence Bruins, to begin the 2018–19 season. After posting 12 points in 16 games with Providence, Goloubef was traded by Boston to the Ottawa Senators in exchange for Paul Carey on January 11, 2019.

On June 25, 2019, Goloubef signed a one-year, two-way contract extension with the Ottawa Senators. During the 2019–20 season, Goloubef appeared in 24 games for the Senators, posting one goal and one assist, before he was placed on waivers on February 20, 2020. He was claimed off waivers by the Detroit Red Wings the following day. Goloubef made 2 appearances with the Red Wings before the season was prematurely ended through the COVID-19 pandemic.

As a free agent leading into the pandemic delayed 2020–21 season, Goloubef signed a professional tryout contract in a return to the Belleville Senators of the AHL on February 4, 2021. He was later signed to a one-year, two-way contract with the Ottawa Senators on April 11, 2021.

Goloubef familiarly as a free agent was signed into the following 2021–22 season to a PTO on two occasions with the Belleville Senators. He appeared in 11 games, registering 1 goal, before he was released from his tryout and agreed to sign his first European contract for the remainder of the season with Swiss top tier club, SC Bern of the National League, on February 20, 2022.

== International play ==
Medal record

Ice hockey

Representing (Canada)

Olympic Games
Bronze medal – third place	2018 Pyeongchang	

World Junior Championships
Gold medal – first place	2009 Canada	

Goloubef was first introduced to the International stage as a junior, when he was selected to the gold-medal winning Canada Ontario squad for the 2006 World U-17 Hockey Challenge.

In the midst of his sophomore season the Badgers, Goloubef was selected to play for Canada at the 2009 World Junior Ice Hockey Championships, where he again won a gold medal.

Goloubef's next international visit was to represent Canada in the Spengler Cup in December 2017. From there, Goloubef once again, was asked to represent his country by joining the men's hockey team for the Winter Olympics in Pyeongchang.

== Personal life ==
Goloubef is of NHL lineage with his great uncle, Dick Duff, a six-time winner of the Stanley Cup with the Toronto Maple Leafs and the Montreal Canadiens in the 1960s, and a member of the Hockey Hall of Fame.

== Career statistics ==
=== Regular season and playoffs ===
			Regular season					Playoffs
Season	Team	League	GP	G	A	Pts	PIM	GP	G	A	Pts	PIM
2005–06	Milton Icehawks	OPJHL	42	9	29	38	38	7	1	3	4	10
2006–07	Oakville Blades	OPJHL	9	5	5	10	46	10	2	10	12	18
2007–08	University of Wisconsin	WCHA	40	4	6	10	36	—	—	—	—	—
2008–09	University of Wisconsin	WCHA	36	5	8	13	38	—	—	—	—	—
2009–10	University of Wisconsin	WCHA	42	3	11	14	64	—	—	—	—	—
2010–11	Springfield Falcons	AHL	50	5	12	17	42	—	—	—	—	—
2011–12	Springfield Falcons	AHL	47	1	7	8	43	—	—	—	—	—
2011–12	Columbus Blue Jackets	NHL	1	0	0	0	0	—	—	—	—	—
2012–13	Springfield Falcons	AHL	38	5	8	13	49	7	0	2	2	10
2012–13	Columbus Blue Jackets	NHL	11	1	0	1	0	—	—	—	—	—
2013–14	Springfield Falcons	AHL	62	7	21	28	98	5	0	0	0	6
2013–14	Columbus Blue Jackets	NHL	5	0	0	0	2	—	—	—	—	—
2014–15	Columbus Blue Jackets	NHL	36	0	9	9	19	—	—	—	—	—
2014–15	Springfield Falcons	AHL	3	0	0	0	0	—	—	—	—	—
2015–16	Columbus Blue Jackets	NHL	43	1	7	8	20	—	—	—	—	—
2016–17	Cleveland Monsters	AHL	16	2	5	7	22	—	—	—	—	—
2016–17	San Antonio Rampage	AHL	2	0	1	1	2	—	—	—	—	—
2016–17	Colorado Avalanche	NHL	33	0	5	5	25	—	—	—	—	—
2017–18	Stockton Heat	AHL	46	8	12	20	68	—	—	—	—	—
2018–19	Providence Bruins	AHL	16	3	9	12	27	—	—	—	—	—
2018–19	Belleville Senators	AHL	30	3	9	12	46	—	—	—	—	—
2018–19	Ottawa Senators	NHL	5	0	0	0	2	—	—	—	—	—
2019–20	Ottawa Senators	NHL	24	1	1	2	8	—	—	—	—	—
2019–20	Detroit Red Wings	NHL	2	0	0	0	0	—	—	—	—	—
2020–21	Belleville Senators	AHL	31	4	2	6	33	—	—	—	—	—
2021–22	Belleville Senators	AHL	11	1	0	1	8	—	—	—	—	—
2021–22	SC Bern	NL	10	0	4	4	14	—	—	—	—	—
2022–23	SC Bern	NL	47	4	7	11	55	6	0	1	1	4
NHL totals			160	3	22	25	76	—	—	—	—	—

=== International ===
Year	Team	Event	Result	GP	G	A	Pts	PIM
2006	Canada Ontario	U17	1st place, gold medalist(s)	5	0	0	0	2
2009	Canada	WJC	1st place, gold medalist(s)	6	0	1	1	8
2018	Canada	OG	3rd place, bronze medalist(s)	6	0	2	2	6
Junior totals				11	0	1	1	10
Senior totals				6	0	2	2	6

== Awards and honours ==
Award	Year
AHL
All-Star Game	2014
