= Yannick Weber =

Swiss ice hockey player (born 1988)

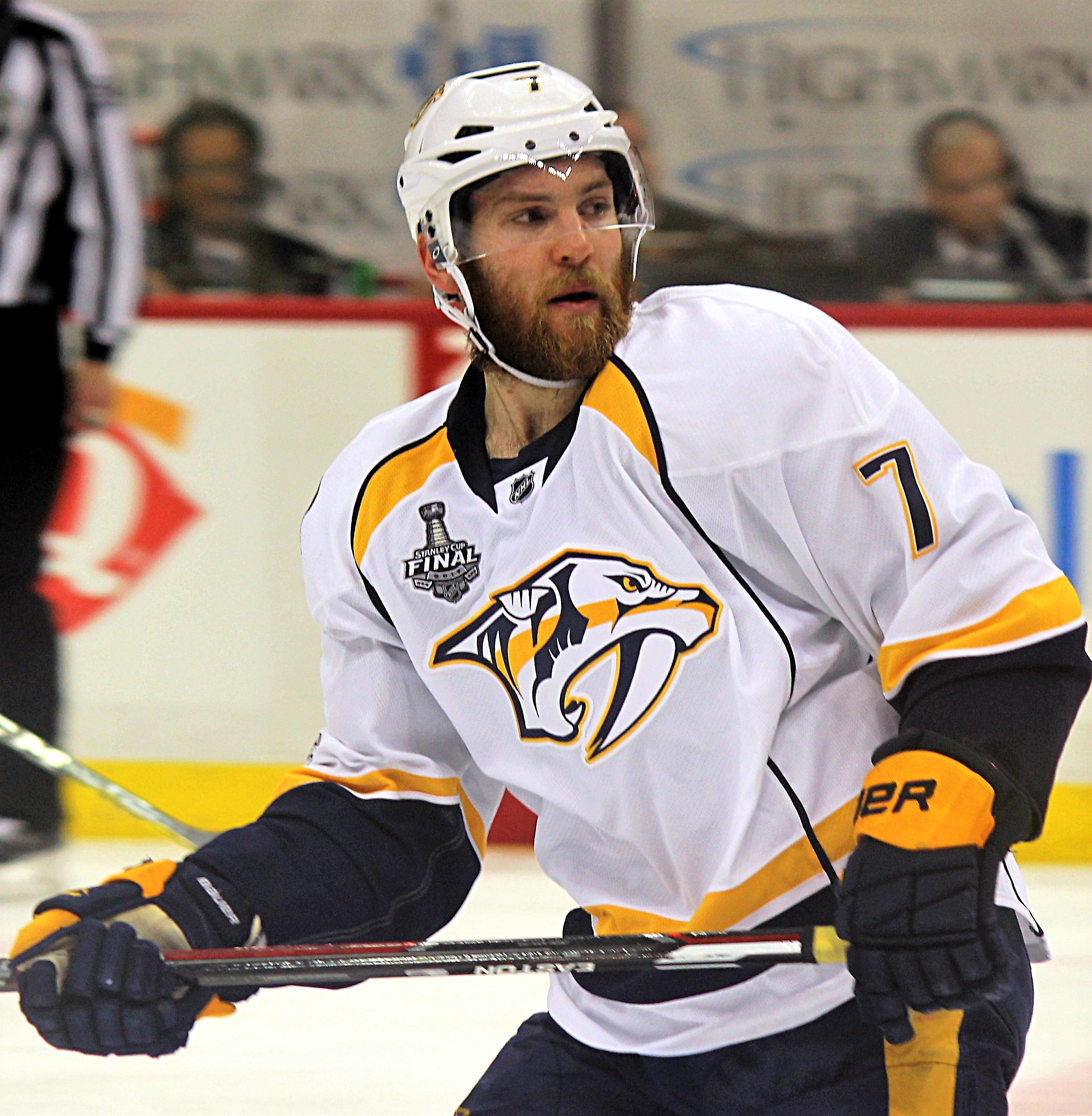
- Weber with the Nashville Predators in 2017
- Born: 23 September 1988 (age 37) Morges, Switzerland
- Height: 5 ft 11 in (180 cm)
- Weight: 200 lb (91 kg; 14 st 4 lb)
- Position: Defence
- Shot: Right
- NL team Former teams: ZSC Lions; Montreal Canadiens; Genève-Servette HC; Vancouver Canucks; Nashville Predators; Pittsburgh Penguins
- National team: Switzerland
- NHL draft: 73rd overall, 2007; Montreal Canadiens
- Playing career: 2008–present

Yannick Cyril Weber (born 23 September 1988) is a Swiss professional ice hockey defenceman for the ZSC Lions of the National League (NL). He was selected in the third round, 73rd overall, by the Montreal Canadiens in the 2007 NHL entry draft. Weber has also previously played for the Pittsburgh Penguins, Nashville Predators, and Vancouver Canucks.

== Playing career ==
=== Early career ===
As a youth, Weber played in the 2002 Quebec International Pee-Wee Hockey Tournament with a team from Central Switzerland.

Weber began his professional hockey career in his native Switzerland, playing for SC Langenthal of the National League B, the second-highest tier of Swiss hockey. However, he moved to Canada in 2006 to develop his game with the Kitchener Rangers of the Ontario Hockey League (OHL). Over the course of two seasons with the Rangers, Weber scored 96 points and added 26 more in the playoffs. In 2007–08, his last season with the Rangers, he helped the team to their fourth J. Ross Robertson Cup championship and to the final of the 2008 Memorial Cup.

The Canadiens signed Weber to a three-year entry-level contract in the summer of 2008. He spent the majority of the next two seasons with the Hamilton Bulldogs, the Canadiens' American Hockey League (AHL) affiliate, with his strong play earning him limited action with Montreal and a spot in the 2009 AHL All-Star Game.

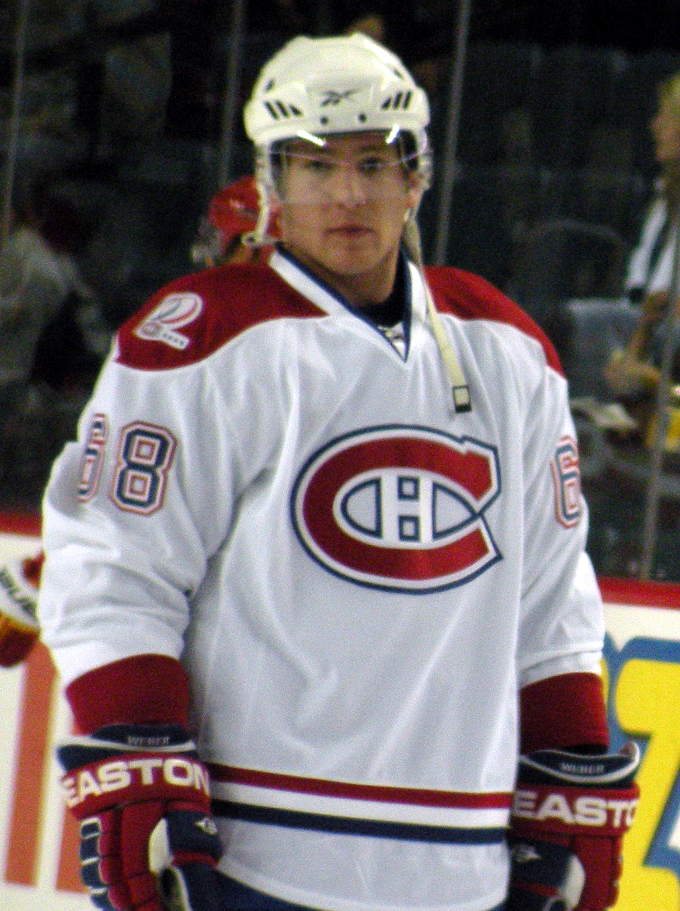
Weber with the Canadiens

=== Montreal Canadiens ===
Weber scored his first career NHL goal during the 2009 playoffs, 20 April against Tim Thomas of the Boston Bruins. Weber scored his first NHL regular season goal on 9 February 2011, also against Tim Thomas. Weber contributed two goals during the Canadiens' first round 2011 playoff series against the Boston Bruins, both times beating Tim Thomas. On 9 October 2011, Weber scored a power play goal against the Winnipeg Jets, contributing to a 5–1 Canadiens win in Winnipeg's first regular season game since 1996.

=== Vancouver Canucks ===
On 5 July 2013, he signed a one-year deal with the Vancouver Canucks after not being qualified as a restricted free agent by the Canadiens.

In the 2014–15 NHL season, Weber set a career-high record in goals with 11. He scored five of those 11 in the final 11 games of the season, 4 of which were on the powerplay. On 1 July 2015, he re-signed with the Canucks to a one-year deal worth $1.5 million. After struggling in the 2015–16 NHL season, the Canucks waived and subsequently assigned him to the Utica Comets in February 2016. However, due to a season-ending injury to Alexander Edler, he was recalled just a few days later before playing any games for the Comets. He would finish the season with the Canucks but did not appear in many games after this point.

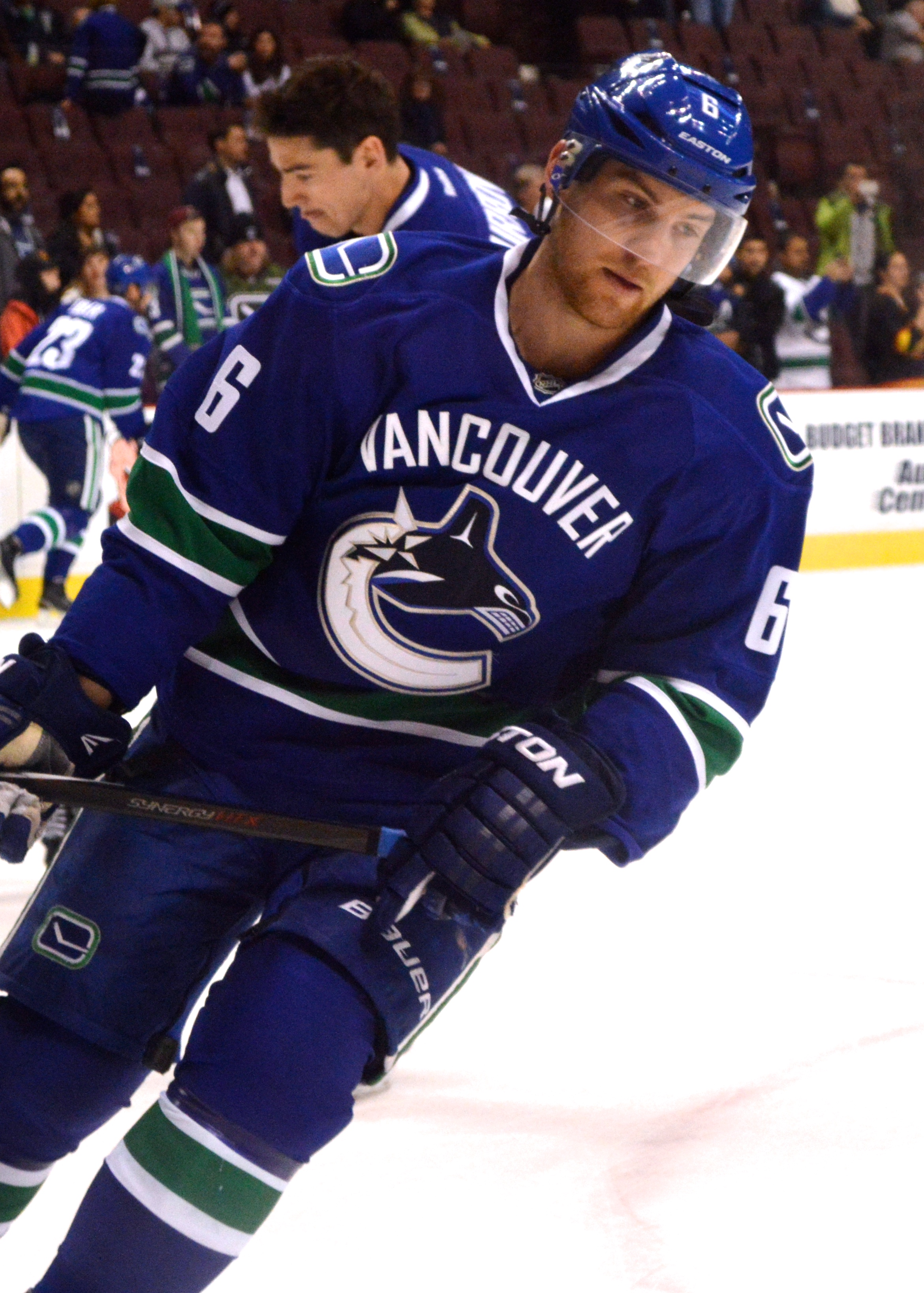
Weber warming up in February 2015.

=== Nashville Predators ===
On 1 July 2016, Weber left the Canucks after three seasons, signing a one-year contract as a free agent with the Nashville Predators. He registered eight points (one goal, seven assists) in 73 regular-season games during the 2016–17 NHL season, as well as one assist in 22 playoff games to help Nashville advance to the Stanley Cup Finals for the first time since entering the NHL in 1998 before losing to the Pittsburgh Penguins in six games.

On 6 June 2017, it was announced that Weber had turned down offers from Geneva and Lugano (that would have paid him more than CHF1.7 million a year over multiple seasons) to pursue his NHL career. The Predators signed Weber thereafter to a one-year contract extension worth $650,000 on 13 July.

After appearing in 26 games to begin the 2017–18 NHL season, the Predators opted to re-sign Weber yet again, this time to a two-year, $1.35 million contract worth $675,000 annually in January 2018.

On 2 January 2021, Weber signed a professional tryout (PTO) agreement to attend the Predators' training camp. However, he was released from this agreement on 13 January.

=== Pittsburgh Penguins ===
On 27 January 2021, Weber signed a one-year, two-way contract worth $700,000 with the Pittsburgh Penguins. Following the conclusion of the 2020–21 NHL season, he announced his retirement from NHL play after 13 seasons.

=== ZSC Lions ===
On 8 June 2021, Weber signed a three-year contract with the ZSC Lions of the National League (NL). During the midst of the Lions' NL championship run during the 2023–24 season, he was extended for an additional two years.

== International play ==
Since 2005, Weber has been a perennial mainstay on the Swiss national team. He made his international debut at the IIHF World U18 Championships in the Czech Republic. He went on to represent his country three times at the World Junior Ice Hockey Championships, captaining the team at the 2008 tournament, where he scored 6 points in as many games. Weber made his senior international debut at the 2009 IIHF World Championship in his home country. Weber was also named to the Swiss roster for the Winter Olympics in 2010, 2014, and 2022.

== Personal life ==
Weber is the brother-in-law of former Canadiens teammate Carey Price through marriage to the latter's younger sister, Kayla, in July 2022. The couple originally met at the 2014 Sochi Olympics when Weber was there to play for Switzerland, and she to see her brother play for Canada.

In July 2024, Weber and his wife welcomed their first child, a daughter named Daisy.

== Career statistics ==
=== Regular season and playoffs ===
			Regular season					Playoffs
Season	Team	League	GP	G	A	Pts	PIM	GP	G	A	Pts	PIM
2003–04	SC Bern	SUI U20	32	2	3	5	39	8	2	0	2	8
2004–05	SC Bern	SUI U20	37	5	4	9	62	5	0	0	0	22
2005–06	SC Bern	SUI U20	17	1	6	7	46	—	—	—	—	—
2005–06	SC Langenthal	NLB	28	3	0	3	8	—	—	—	—	—
2006–07	SC Bern	SUI U20	1	0	0	0	2	—	—	—	—	—
2006–07	Kitchener Rangers	OHL	51	13	28	41	42	9	3	6	9	8
2007–08	Kitchener Rangers	OHL	59	20	35	55	79	17	4	13	17	24
2008–09	Hamilton Bulldogs	AHL	68	16	28	44	42	2	0	1	1	10
2008–09	Montreal Canadiens	NHL	3	0	1	1	2	3	1	1	2	0
2009–10	Hamilton Bulldogs	AHL	65	7	25	32	58	3	0	0	0	2
2009–10	Montreal Canadiens	NHL	5	0	0	0	4	—	—	—	—	—
2010–11	Hamilton Bulldogs	AHL	15	8	4	12	10	—	—	—	—	—
2010–11	Montreal Canadiens	NHL	41	1	10	11	22	3	2	0	2	0
2011–12	Montreal Canadiens	NHL	60	4	14	18	30	—	—	—	—	—
2012–13	Genève–Servette HC	NLA	32	5	16	21	40	—	—	—	—	—
2012–13	Montreal Canadiens	NHL	6	0	2	2	2	—	—	—	—	—
2013–14	Vancouver Canucks	NHL	49	6	4	10	16	—	—	—	—	—
2013–14	Utica Comets	AHL	7	2	5	7	0	—	—	—	—	—
2014–15	Vancouver Canucks	NHL	65	11	10	21	30	6	0	0	0	12
2015–16	Vancouver Canucks	NHL	45	0	7	7	24	—	—	—	—	—
2016–17	Nashville Predators	NHL	73	1	7	8	25	22	0	1	1	5
2017–18	Nashville Predators	NHL	47	2	3	5	16	4	1	0	1	2
2018–19	Nashville Predators	NHL	62	2	6	8	18	—	—	—	—	—
2019–20	Nashville Predators	NHL	41	1	2	3	14	4	0	0	0	0
2020–21	Pittsburgh Penguins	NHL	2	0	0	0	0	—	—	—	—	—
2021–22	ZSC Lions	NL	49	3	12	15	36	18	0	3	3	12
2022–23	ZSC Lions	NL	52	5	8	13	27	9	0	1	1	6
2023–24	ZSC Lions	NL	52	4	5	9	14	13	3	5	8	4
2024–25	ZSC Lions	NL	50	5	15	20	16	16	0	4	4	6
NHL totals			499	28	66	94	195	42	4	2	6	19
NL totals			235	22	56	78	133	56	3	13	16	28

=== International ===
Year	Team	Event	Result	GP	G	A	Pts	PIM
2005	Switzerland	WJC18	9th	6	1	0	1	6
2006	Switzerland	WJC	7th	6	1	0	1	4
2006	Switzerland	WJC18 D1	12th	5	0	2	2	22
2007	Switzerland	WJC	7th	6	1	3	4	10
2008	Switzerland	WJC	9th	6	2	4	6	14
2009	Switzerland	WC	9th	3	0	0	0	8
2010	Switzerland	OG	8th	5	0	0	0	6
2014	Switzerland	OG	9th	4	0	0	0	2
2014	Switzerland	WC	10th	7	3	1	4	4
2016	Switzerland	WC	11th	7	1	2	3	4
2019	Switzerland	WC	8th	7	0	1	1	18
2022	Switzerland	OG	8th	5	0	1	1	2
Junior totals				29	5	9	14	56
Senior totals				38	4	5	9	44

== Awards and honours ==
Award	Year	Ref
OHL
Second All-Rookie Team	2007	
J. Ross Robertson Cup champion	2008	
Second All-Star Team	2008	
AHL
All-Rookie Team	2009	
All-Star Game	2009	
National League
Swiss Championship	2024	
