= Ryan Stanton =

Canadian ice hockey player (born 1989)

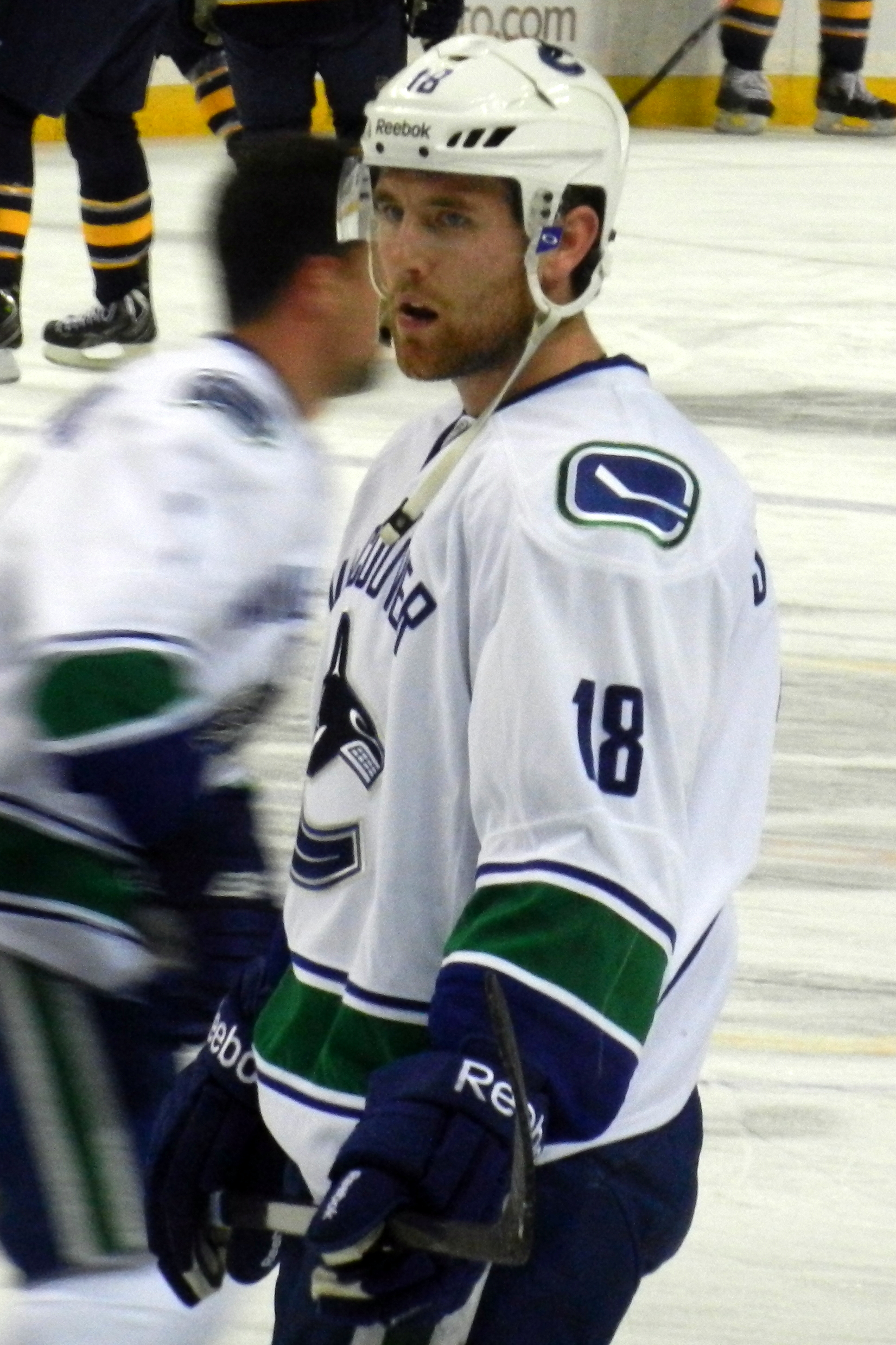
- Stanton with the Vancouver Canucks in 2013
- Born: July 20, 1989 (age 37) St. Albert, Alberta, Canada
- Height: 6 ft 1 in (185 cm)
- Weight: 190 lb (86 kg; 13 st 8 lb)
- Position: Defence
- Shoots: Left
- ICEHL team Former teams: HC Pustertal Wölfe; Chicago Blackhawks; Vancouver Canucks; Washington Capitals; Kölner Haie
- NHL draft: Undrafted
- Playing career: 2010–present

Ryan Stanton (born July 20, 1989) is a Canadian professional ice hockey defenseman who is currently playing with HC Pustertal Wölfe in the ICE Hockey League (ICHEL).

== Personal life ==
Stanton was born on July 20, 1989, in St. Albert, Alberta, Canada, to construction superintendent Don and mother Deanne Stanton. His father joined the scouting staff for the Moose Jaw Warriors in 2013, three years after Stanton had played with that team.

== Playing career ==
=== Junior ===
Prior to turning professional, Stanton played major junior hockey in the Western Hockey League (WHL) with the Moose Jaw Warriors. Stanton made his debut in the WHL against the Brandon Wheat Kings on March 8, 2006 at the age of 16. He had a streak of six straight games ranging from 10/30/09 to 11/14/09 in which he recorded a point for a total of 11 points. During that streak, Stanton had 3 goals and 8 assists. On December 11, 2009, Stanton recorded four assists to lead his team to an 11–2 win over the Edmonton Oil Kings. He led all Moose Jaw Warriors defenceman in the 2009-10 season with 40 points (10 goals - 30 assists).

=== Professional ===
On March 12, 2010, the Chicago Blackhawks signed Stanton as an Undrafted free agent to a three-year entry-level contract. Stanton played for the Blackhawks affiliate, the Rockford Icehogs, of the American Hockey League (AHL). He made his debut for the Icehogs on March 6, 2010 against the Houston Aeros with a +1 rating in a 3-1 Rockford victory. His first AHL career point was an assist on March 10, 2010 against the San Antonio Rampage in a 4–2 loss. Stanton's first career professional goal was scored in a 4-3 Icehogs loss on February 23, 2011 against the Chicago Wolves.

For the 2010–11 season, Stanton was named the Icehog's Most Improved Player. In the 2012–13 season, he played in his first NHL game with the Blackhawks on April 27, 2013. The Blackhawks would go on to win the Stanley Cup that season, although Stanton did not qualify to have his name on the Stanley Cup.

Stanton was claimed off of waivers from the Blackhawks by the Vancouver Canucks, before the 2013–14 season on September 30, 2013. Stanton scored his first NHL goal on October 17, 2013 against Ryan Miller of the Buffalo Sabres.

After establishing himself in the NHL in his two seasons with the Canucks, on July 24, 2015, Stanton signed as a free agent to a one-year, two-way contract with the Washington Capitals.

At the conclusion of the season and at the end of his contract with the Capitals he signed a one-year, two-way contract as a free agent to join the Colorado Avalanche. After attending the Avalanche's training camp and participating in pre-season games, Stanton was assigned to the AHL to play with affiliate, the San Antonio Rampage. Stanton made his Rampage and 2016–17 season debut in a 2–1 defeat against the Milwaukee Admirals on October 15, 2016. On November 28, 2016, after 15 games with the Rampage, Stanton was dealt by the Avalanche to the Columbus Blue Jackets in exchange for Cody Goloubef. Stanton was reassigned to the Cleveland Monsters following the trade. He played out the season with the Monsters, appearing in 33 games from the blueline for 8 points.

On July 1, 2017, Stanton signed as a free agent to a two-year, two-way deal with the Edmonton Oilers. On October 31, Stanton was sent to the Oilers' AHL affiliate Bakersfield Condors.

After spending the duration of his contract assigned to the Condors, Stanton left the Oilers as a free agent to sign a one-year contract to continue in the AHL with the Ontario Reign on July 29, 2019. In the 2019–20 season, Stanton was limited to just 36 games through injury with Ontario, collecting 5 points, before the season was ended prematurely due to the COVID-19 pandemic.

On September 16, 2020, Stanton was signed as a free agent to return to former AHL club, the Bakersfield Condors, on a one-year contract.

On August 4, 2021, Stanton extended his AHL career, returning as a free agent to his original club, the Rockford IceHogs, on a one-year contract.

On July 15, 2022, Stanton was signed to his first contract abroad after signing a one-year deal with German club, Kölner Haie of the Deutsche Eishockey Liga (DEL). At the conclusion of his contract with the Sharks, Stanton remained in Europe after moving to neighbouring league the ICEHL, in joining Italian based HC Pustertal Wölfe on April 19, 2023.

== Career statistics ==
			Regular season					Playoffs
Season	Team	League	GP	G	A	Pts	PIM	GP	G	A	Pts	PIM
2005–06	Moose Jaw Warriors	WHL	2	0	0	0	2	—	—	—	—	—
2006–07	Moose Jaw Warriors	WHL	54	0	8	8	75	—	—	—	—	—
2007–08	Moose Jaw Warriors	WHL	58	4	16	20	68	6	0	0	0	2
2008–09	Moose Jaw Warriors	WHL	69	5	29	34	111	—	—	—	—	—
2009–10	Moose Jaw Warriors	WHL	59	10	30	40	81	7	0	6	6	4
2009–10	Rockford Icehogs	AHL	2	0	1	1	0	2	0	0	0	0
2010–11	Rockford Icehogs	AHL	73	3	14	17	76	—	—	—	—	—
2011–12	Rockford Icehogs	AHL	76	3	14	17	130	—	—	—	—	—
2012–13	Rockford Icehogs	AHL	73	3	22	25	126	—	—	—	—	—
2012–13	Chicago Blackhawks	NHL	1	0	0	0	2	—	—	—	—	—
2013–14	Vancouver Canucks	NHL	64	1	15	16	32	—	—	—	—	—
2014–15	Vancouver Canucks	NHL	54	3	8	11	35	—	—	—	—	—
2015–16	Hershey Bears	AHL	60	4	12	16	69	21	3	2	5	32
2015–16	Washington Capitals	NHL	1	0	0	0	2	—	—	—	—	—
2016–17	San Antonio Rampage	AHL	15	1	3	4	29	—	—	—	—	—
2016–17	Cleveland Monsters	AHL	33	1	7	8	40	—	—	—	—	—
2017–18	Bakersfield Condors	AHL	46	2	6	8	44	—	—	—	—	—
2018–19	Bakersfield Condors	AHL	65	5	15	20	76	10	2	1	3	6
2019–20	Ontario Reign	AHL	36	2	3	5	28	—	—	—	—	—
2020–21	Bakersfield Condors	AHL	35	1	12	13	28	6	0	0	0	29
2021–22	Rockford IceHogs	AHL	56	3	15	18	42	5	0	0	0	6
2022–23	Kölner Haie	DEL	34	2	6	8	18	4	0	0	0	8
NHL totals			120	4	23	27	71	—	—	—	—	—
