= 2013–14 Anaheim Ducks season =

NHL team season

2013–14 Anaheim Ducks
- Pacific Division champions
- Division: 1st Pacific
- Conference: 1st Western
- 2013–14 record: 54–20–8
- Home record: 29–8–4
- Road record: 25–12–4
- Goals for: 266
- Goals against: 209

Team information
- General manager: Bob Murray
- Coach: Bruce Boudreau
- Captain: Ryan Getzlaf
- Alternate captains: Saku Koivu; Teemu Selanne
- Arena: Honda Center
- Average attendance: 16,469 (95.9%) (41 games)

Team leaders
- Goals: Corey Perry (43)
- Assists: Ryan Getzlaf (56)
- Points: Ryan Getzlaf (87)
- Penalty minutes: Patrick Maroon (101)
- Plus/minus: Corey Perry (+32)
- Wins: Jonas Hiller (29)
- Goals against average: John Gibson (1.33)

The 2013–14 Anaheim Ducks season was the 21st season for the National Hockey League (NHL) franchise. The Ducks achieved their best regular season record in franchise history, amassing 116 points and finishing first in the Western Conference and second in the NHL, behind the Boston Bruins by only a single point. However, the Ducks only won one playoff series; after defeating the Dallas Stars in six games in the first round, they fell in seven games to their crosstown rival Los Angeles Kings in the Western Conference Semifinal.

This was Teemu Selanne's final season, following 23 NHL seasons and 15 in which he played for Anaheim. It was also Saku Koivu's final season.

== Standings ==
Pacific Division
Pos	Team	GP	W	L	OTL	ROW	GF	GA	GD	Pts
1	y – Anaheim Ducks	82	54	20	8	51	266	209	+57	116
2	x – San Jose Sharks	82	51	22	9	41	249	200	+49	111
3	x – Los Angeles Kings	82	46	28	8	38	206	174	+32	100
4	Phoenix Coyotes	82	37	30	15	31	216	231	−15	89
5	Vancouver Canucks	82	36	35	11	31	196	223	−27	83
6	Calgary Flames	82	35	40	7	28	209	241	−32	77
7	Edmonton Oilers	82	29	44	9	25	203	270	−67	67

Source: National Hockey League
x – Clinched playoff spot; y – Clinched division

== Schedule and results ==
=== Pre-season ===
2013 preseason game log: 3–4–0 (Home: 1–3–0; Road: 2–1–0)
#	Date	Visitor	Score	Home	OT	Decision	Attendance	Record	Recap
1	September 16	Phoenix	2–6	Anaheim		Hiller	11,541	1–0–0	W1
2	September 17	Los Angeles	6–0	Anaheim		Fasth	13,115	1–1–0	L1
3	September 18	Anaheim	2–1	Colorado		Gibson		2–1–0	W1
4	September 20	Anaheim	3–2	San Jose	OT	Fasth	15,760	3–1–0	W2
5	September 22	Colorado	2–1	Anaheim		Hiller	12,743	3–2–0	L1
6	September 24	Anaheim	1–2	Los Angeles		Fasth	15,179	3–3–0	L2
7	September 28	San Jose	6–5	Anaheim		Hiller	15,746	3–4–0	L3

=== Regular season ===
2013–14 Game Log

October: 10–3–1 (Home: 5–0–0; Road: 5–3–1)
#	Date	Visitor	Score	Home	OT	Decision	Attendance	Record	Pts	Recap
1	October 2	Anaheim	1–6	Colorado		Fasth	18,007	0–1–0	0	L1
2	October 5	Anaheim	4–3	Minnesota	OT	Hiller	18,213	1–1–0	2	W1
3	October 6	Anaheim	3–2	Winnipeg		Fasth	15,004	2–1–0	4	W2
4	October 10	NY Rangers	0–6	Anaheim		Hiller	17,179	3–1–0	6	W3
5	October 13	Ottawa	1–4	Anaheim		Hiller	17,177	4–1–0	8	W4
6	October 16	Calgary	2–3	Anaheim		Fasth	14,051	5–1–0	10	W5
7	October 18	Phoenix	2–3	Anaheim	SO	Hiller	13,206	6–1–0	12	W6
8	October 20	Dallas	3–6	Anaheim		Andersen	14,531	7–1–0	14	W7
9	October 22	Anaheim	2–4	Toronto		Hiller	19,408	7–2–0	14	L1
10	October 24	Anaheim	1–4	Montreal		Hiller	21,273	7–3–0	14	L2
11	October 25	Anaheim	2–1	Ottawa		Andersen	17,590	8–3–0	16	W1
12	October 27	Anaheim	4–3	Columbus		Andersen	10,542	9–3–0	18	W2
13	October 29	Anaheim	3–2	Philadelphia		Hiller	19,615	10–3–0	20	W3
14	October 31	Anaheim	2–3	Boston	SO	Hiller	17,565	10–3–1	21	O1

November: 8–4–3 (Home: 5–0–1; Road: 3–4–2)
#	Date	Visitor	Score	Home	OT	Decision	Attendance	Record	Pts	Recap
15	November 2	Anaheim	6–3	Buffalo		Hiller	19,070	11–3–1	23	W1
16	November 4	Anaheim	2–1	NY Rangers		Andersen	18,006	12–3–1	25	W2
17	November 6	Phoenix	2–5	Anaheim		Hiller	14,045	13–3–1	27	W3
18	November 8	Buffalo	2–6	Anaheim		Andersen	15,577	14–3–1	29	W4
19	November 10	Vancouver	1–3	Anaheim		Andersen	17,174	15–3–1	31	W5
20	November 12	Anaheim	2–3	Florida		Andersen	13,354	15–4–1	31	L1
21	November 14	Anaheim	1–5	Tampa Bay		Hiller	17,763	15–5–1	31	L2
22	November 15	Anaheim	2–3	Carolina	SO	Fasth	14,802	15–5–2	32	O1
23	November 18	Anaheim	1–3	Pittsburgh		Fasth	18,614	15–6–2	32	L1
24	November 20	New Jersey	4–3	Anaheim	OT	Hiller	14,306	15–6–3	33	O1
25	November 22	Tampa Bay	0–1	Anaheim	OT	Hiller	16,648	16–6–3	35	W1
26	November 23	Anaheim	4–2	Phoenix		Hiller	13,490	17–6–3	37	W2
27	November 26	Anaheim	3–6	Dallas		Hiller	15,792	17–7–3	37	L1
28	November 29	Calgary	2–5	Anaheim		Andersen	17,174	18–7–3	39	W1
29	November 30	Anaheim	3–4	San Jose	SO	Hiller	17,562	18–7–4	40	O1

December: 11–1–1 (Home: 5–0–1; Road: 6–1–0)
#	Date	Visitor	Score	Home	OT	Decision	Attendance	Record	Pts	Recap
30	December 3	Los Angeles	3–2	Anaheim	SO	Hiller	17,294	18–7–5	41	O2
31	December 6	Anaheim	3–2	Chicago	SO	Hiller	21,586	19–7–5	43	W1
32	December 7	Anaheim	5–2	St. Louis		Andersen	17,646	20–7–5	45	W2
33	December 9	NY Islanders	2–5	Anaheim		Hiller	14,830	21–7–5	47	W3
34	December 11	Minnesota	1–2	Anaheim		Hiller	15,252	22–7–5	49	W4
35	December 15	Edmonton	2–3	Anaheim		Hiller	16,301	23–7–5	51	W5
36	December 17	Anaheim	5–2	Detroit		Hiller	20,066	24–7–5	53	W6
37	December 20	Anaheim	3–2	New Jersey	OT	Hiller	15,723	25–7–5	55	W7
38	December 21	Anaheim	5–3	NY Islanders		Andersen	13,108	26–7–5	57	W8
39	December 23	Anaheim	3–2	Washington		Hiller	18,506	27–7–5	59	W9
40	December 28	Phoenix	2–3	Anaheim	OT	Hiller	17,442	28–7–5	61	W10
41	December 29	Anaheim	1–3	San Jose		Andersen	17,562	28–8–5	61	L1
42	December 31	San Jose	3–6	Anaheim		Hiller	17,442	29–8–5	63	W1

January: 11–3–0 (Home: 7–2–0; Road: 4–1–0)
#	Date	Visitor	Score	Home	OT	Decision	Attendance	Record	Pts	Recap
43	January 3	Edmonton	2–5	Anaheim		Hiller	17,174	30–8–5	65	W2
44	January 5	Vancouver	3–4	Anaheim	OT	Hiller	17,174	31–8–5	67	W3
45	January 7	Boston	2–5	Anaheim		Hiller	17,238	32–8–5	69	W4
46	January 9	Anaheim	4–3	Nashville		Andersen	15,892	33–8–5	71	W5
47	January 11	Anaheim	5–3	Phoenix		Hiller	13,289	34–8–5	73	W6
48	January 12	Detroit	0–1	Anaheim		Hiller	17,375	35–8–5	75	W7
49	January 15	Vancouver	1–9	Anaheim		Andersen	17,145	36–8–5	77	W8
50	January 17	Anaheim	2–4	Chicago		Hiller	22,064	36–9–5	77	L1
51	January 18	Anaheim	3–2	St. Louis		Andersen	19,910	37–9–5	79	W1
52	January 21	Winnipeg	3–2	Anaheim		Hiller	15,046	37–10–5	79	L1
53	January 23	Los Angeles	1–2	Anaheim		Andersen	17,503	38–10–5	81	W1
54	January 25 (outdoor game)	Anaheim	3–0	Los Angeles		Hiller	54,099 (at Dodger Stadium)	39–10–5	83	W2
55	January 28	Minnesota	4–2	Anaheim		Hiller	15,020	39–11–5	83	L1
56	January 30	Philadelphia	3–5	Anaheim		Andersen	16,007	40–11–5	85	W1

February: 2–3–0 (Home: 1–3–0; Road: 1–0–0)
#	Date	Visitor	Score	Home	OT	Decision	Attendance	Record	Pts	Recap
57	February 1	Dallas	2–0	Anaheim		Hiller	17,174	40–12–5	85	L1
58	February 3	Columbus	4–2	Anaheim		Andersen	14,044	40–13–5	85	L2
59	February 5	Chicago	2–0	Anaheim		Hiller	17,446	40–14–5	85	L3
60	February 8	Anaheim	5–2	Nashville		Hiller	17,139	41–14–5	87	W1
61	February 28	St. Louis	0–1	Anaheim		Hiller	17,369	42–14–5	89	W2

March: 7–4–3 (Home: 3–2–2; Road: 4–2–1)
#	Date	Visitor	Score	Home	OT	Decision	Attendance	Record	Pts	Recap
62	March 2	Carolina	3–5	Anaheim		Andersen	17,174	43–14–5	91	W3
63	March 5	Montreal	4–3	Anaheim	SO	Hiller	17,174	43–14–6	92	O1
64	March 7	Pittsburgh	3–2	Anaheim	SO	Hiller	17,518	43–14–7	93	O2
65	March 10	Toronto	1–3	Anaheim		Andersen	17,229	43–15–7	93	L1
66	March 12	Anaheim	2–7	Calgary		Hiller	19,289	43–16–7	93	L2
67	March 14	Anaheim	6–4	Colorado		Hiller	18,030	44–16–7	95	W1
68	March 15	Anaheim	2–1	Los Angeles		Andersen	18,278	45–16–7	97	W2
69	March 18	Washington	3–2	Anaheim		Hiller	17,174	45–17–7	97	L1
70	March 20	Anaheim	3–2	San Jose		Andersen	17,562	45–18–7	97	L2
71	March 23	Florida	2–6	Anaheim		Hiller	17,281	46–18–7	99	W1
72	March 26	Anaheim	3–2	Calgary		Hiller	19,289	47–18–7	101	W2
73	March 28	Anaheim	3–4	Edmonton	OT	Hiller	16,839	47–18–8	102	O1
74	March 29	Anaheim	5–1	Vancouver		Andersen	18,910	48–18–8	104	W1
75	March 31	Winnipeg	4–5	Anaheim	OT	Andersen	17,174	49–18–8	106	W2

April: 5–2–0 (Home: 3–1–0; Road: 2–1–0)
#	Date	Visitor	Score	Home	OT	Decision	Attendance	Record	Pts	Recap
76	April 2	Edmonton	2–3	Anaheim		Andersen	17,174	50–18–8	108	W3
77	April 4	Nashville	5–2	Anaheim		Hiller	17,174	50–19–8	108	L1
78	April 6	Anaheim	2–4	Edmonton		Hiller	16,839	50–20–8	108	L2
79	April 7	Anaheim	3–0	Vancouver		Gibson	18,910	51–20–8	110	W1
80	April 9	San Jose	2–5	Anaheim		Gibson	17,322	52–20–8	112	W2
81	April 12	Anaheim	4–3	Los Angeles	SO	Andersen	18,372	53–20–8	114	W3
82	April 13	Colorado	2–3	Anaheim	OT	Gibson	17,528	54–20–8	116	W4

Legend: Win (2 points) Loss (0 points) Overtime/shootout loss (1 point)

== Playoffs ==
The Anaheim Ducks entered the playoffs as the Pacific Division's first seed. They defeated the Dallas Stars in the first round, winning the best-of-seven series four games to two. The series included a Game 6 comeback wherein the Ducks scored a game-tying goal with 24 seconds remaining and then won the game in overtime.

The Ducks faced their crosstown rival Los Angeles Kings in the second round. The Ducks would fall behind 2–0 to begin the series, tie the series 2–2 and take their first lead after Game 5. They would not win again, however, as the Kings won the series 4–3 in a Game 7 decision.

2014 Stanley Cup Playoffs

Western Conference First Round vs. (WC) Dallas Stars: Anaheim won series 4–2
#	Date	Visitor	Score	Home	OT	Decision	Attendance	Series	Recap
1	April 16	Dallas	3–4	Anaheim		Andersen	17,294	1–0	Recap
2	April 18	Dallas	2–3	Anaheim		Andersen	17,426	2–0	Recap
3	April 21	Anaheim	0–3	Dallas		Andersen	19,120	2–1	Recap
4	April 23	Anaheim	2–4	Dallas		Andersen	18,962	2–2	Recap
5	April 25	Dallas	2–6	Anaheim		Andersen	17,334	3–2	Recap
6	April 27	Anaheim	5–4	Dallas	OT	Hiller	19,323	4–2	Recap

Western Conference Second Round vs. (P3) Los Angeles Kings: Los Angeles won Series 4–3
#	Date	Visitor	Score	Home	OT	Decision	Attendance	Series	Recap
1	May 3	Los Angeles	3–2	Anaheim	OT	Hiller	17,393	0–1	Recap
2	May 5	Los Angeles	3–1	Anaheim		Hiller	17,281	0–2	Recap
3	May 8	Anaheim	3–2	Los Angeles		Hiller	18,822	1–2	Recap
4	May 10	Anaheim	2–0	Los Angeles		Gibson	18,889	2–2	Recap
5	May 12	Los Angeles	3–4	Anaheim		Gibson	17,233	3–2	Recap
6	May 14	Anaheim	1–2	Los Angeles		Gibson	18,880	3–3	Recap
7	May 16	Los Angeles	6–2	Anaheim		Gibson	17,395	3–4	Recap

* if necessary
Legend: Win Loss

== Player statistics ==
Final Stats

Skaters

Regular season
Player	GP	G	A	Pts	+/−	PIM
Ryan Getzlaf	77	31	56	87	28	31
Corey Perry	81	43	39	82	32	65
Nick Bonino	77	22	27	49	14	22
Mathieu Perreault	69	18	25	43	13	36
Andrew Cogliano	82	21	21	42	13	26
Cam Fowler	70	6	30	36	15	14
Dustin Penner^{‡}	49	13	19	32	22	28
Kyle Palmieri	71	14	17	31	9	38
Daniel Winnik	76	6	24	30	6	23
Hampus Lindholm	78	6	24	30	29	36
Saku Koivu	65	11	18	29	3	46
Patrick Maroon	62	11	18	29	11	101
Teemu Selanne	64	9	18	27	8	12
Matt Beleskey	55	9	15	24	8	64
Jakob Silfverberg	52	10	13	23	2	12
Sami Vatanen	48	6	15	21	9	22
Ben Lovejoy	78	5	13	18	21	39
Francois Beauchemin	70	4	13	17	26	39
Emerson Etem	29	7	4	11	3	4
Devante Smith-Pelly	19	2	8	10	5	2
Bryan Allen	68	0	10	10	20	75
Luca Sbisa	30	1	5	6	0	43
Stephane Robidas^{†}	14	1	4	5	3	8
Mark Fistric	34	1	4	5	9	28
Tim Jackman^{†}	26	3	1	4	−2	62
Rickard Rakell	18	0	4	4	−3	2
Alex Grant^{‡}	2	2	0	2	3	2
Peter Holland^{‡}	4	1	0	1	−1	2
Nolan Yonkman	2	0	1	1	−1	0
Dave Steckel	6	0	0	0	0	0

Playoffs
Player	GP	G	A	Pts	+/−	PIM
Ryan Getzlaf	12	4	11	15	−2	10
Corey Perry	13	4	7	11	−2	19
Nick Bonino	13	4	4	8	3	8
Patrick Maroon	13	2	5	7	−2	38
Andrew Cogliano	13	1	6	7	−2	8
Teemu Selanne	12	2	4	6	−2	4
Devante Smith-Pelly	12	5	0	5	−1	24
Mathieu Perreault	11	2	3	5	−4	18
Matt Beleskey	5	2	2	4	0	8
Cam Fowler	13	0	4	4	2	4
Francois Beauchemin	13	0	4	4	−4	2
Kyle Palmieri	9	3	0	3	1	14
Ben Lovejoy	13	2	0	2	1	8
Jakob Silfverberg	13	2	0	2	−3	4
Rickard Rakell	4	1	1	2	−2	0
Hampus Lindholm	11	0	2	2	−2	0
Bryan Allen	13	1	0	1	−4	28
Saku Koivu	13	0	1	1	−3	8
Daniel Winnik	9	0	1	1	1	2
Luca Sbisa	2	0	1	1	−2	5
Sami Vatanen	5	0	1	1	−2	0
Stephane Robidas	3	0	0	0	0	2
Mark Fistric	5	0	0	0	−1	6
Emerson Etem	4	0	0	0	0	12

Goaltenders

Regular season
Player	GP	GS	TOI	W	L	OT	GA	GAA	SA	SV%	SO	G	A	PIM
Jonas Hiller	50	50	2,908:48	29	13	7	120	2.48	1348	0.911	5	0	2	0
Frederik Andersen	28	24	1,569:26	20	5	0	60	2.29	783	0.923	0	0	1	0
Viktor Fasth^{‡}	5	5	304:47	2	2	1	15	2.95	131	0.885	0	0	0	0
John Gibson	3	3	181:07	3	0	0	4	1.33	87	.954	1	0	0	0

Playoffs
Player	GP	GS	TOI	W	L	GA	GAA	SA	SV%	SO	G	A	PIM
Frederik Andersen	7	7	368	3	2	19	3.10	189	.899	0	0	0	0
Jonas Hiller	6	2	219	2	2	8	2.19	85	.906	0	0	0	0
John Gibson	4	4	200	2	2	9	2.70	111	.919	1	0	0	0

^{†}Denotes player spent time with another team before joining the Ducks. Stats reflect time with the Ducks only.
^{‡}Denotes player was traded mid-season. Stats reflect time with the Team only.
Bold/italics denotes franchise record.

== Awards and records ==
=== Awards ===
Regular Season
Player	Award	Awarded
Bob Murray	2013–14 NHL General Manager of the Year Award	June 24, 2014

== Transactions ==
The Ducks have been involved in the following transactions during the 2013–14 season.

=== Trades ===
Date	Details
July 5, 2013	To Ottawa Senators Bobby Ryan	To Anaheim Ducks Jakob Silfverberg; Stefan Noesen; 1st-round pick in 2014
September 29, 2013	To Washington Capitals John Mitchell; 4th-round pick in 2014	To Anaheim Ducks Mathieu Perreault
November 16, 2013	To Toronto Maple Leafs Peter Holland; Brad Staubitz	To Anaheim Ducks Jesse Blacker; Conditional 3rd-round pick in 2014; 7th-round pick in 2014
November 21, 2013	To Calgary Flames 6th-round pick in 2014	To Anaheim Ducks Tim Jackman
March 4, 2014	To Washington Capitals Dustin Penner	To Anaheim Ducks 4th-round pick in 2014
March 4, 2014	To Dallas Stars Conditional 4th-round pick in 2014	To Anaheim Ducks Stephane Robidas
March 4, 2014	To Edmonton Oilers Viktor Fasth	To Anaheim Ducks 5th-round pick in 2014; 3rd-round pick in 2015
March 5, 2014	To Ottawa Senators Alex Grant	To Anaheim Ducks Andre Petersson
June 14, 2014	To Montreal Canadiens Conditional 5th-round pick in 2015	To Anaheim Ducks Louis Leblanc

=== Free agents signed ===
Player	Former team	Contract terms
Zack Stortini	Hamilton Bulldogs	1 year, $600,000
Nolan Yonkman	Florida Panthers	1 year, $600,000
Alex Grant	Wilkes-Barre/Scranton Penguins	1 year, $550,000
Dustin Penner	Los Angeles Kings	1 year, $2 million
Mark Fistric	Edmonton Oilers	1 year, $900,000
Matt Bailey	University of Alaska Anchorage	2 years, $1.385 million entry-level contract
Ryan Faragher	St. Cloud State University	1 year, $615,000 entry-level contract

=== Free agents lost ===
Player	New team	Contract terms
Radek Dvorak	Carolina Hurricanes	1 year, $600,000

=== Players signings ===
Player	Date	Contract terms
Saku Koivu	July 5, 2013	1 year, $3.5 million
Matt Beleskey	July 5, 2013	2 years, $2.7 million
Mat Clark	July 15, 2013	1 year, $550,000
Kyle Palmieri	July 26, 2013	3 years, $4.4 million
Teemu Selanne	August 30, 2013	1 year, $2 million
Shea Theodore	September 24, 2013	3 years, $2.775 million entry-level contract
Dave Steckel	November 11, 2013	1 year, $550,000
Nick Bonino	November 28, 2013	3 years, $5.7 million contract extension
Andrew Cogliano	January 4, 2014	4 years, $12 million contract extension
Tim Jackman	March 1, 2014	1 year, $637,500 contract extension
Josh Manson	March 25, 2014	2 years, $1.85 million entry-level contract
Nick Sorensen	April 3, 2014	3 years, $2.41 million entry-level contract
Jaycob Megna	April 4, 2014	3 years, $2.36 million entry-level contract
Nic Kerdiles	April 5, 2014	3 years, $2.775 million entry-level contract
Kenton Helgesen	April 19, 2014	3 years, $1.88 million entry-level contract

== Draft picks ==
Anaheim Ducks' picks at the 2013 NHL entry draft, to be held in Newark, New Jersey on June 30, 2013.

Round	#	Player	Pos	Nationality	College/Junior/Club team (League)
1	26	Shea Theodore	Defense	Canada	Seattle Thunderbirds (WHL)
2	45^{[a]}	Nick Sorensen	Right wing	Denmark	Quebec Remparts QMJHL
3	87	Keaton Thompson	Defense	United States	U.S. National Team Development Program (USHL)
5	147	Grant Besse	Right wing	United States	Benilde-St. Margaret's (USHS-MN)
6	177	Miro Aaltonen	Center	Finland	Blues (SM-liiga)

Draft notes

- ^{a} The New York Islanders' second-round pick went to the Anaheim Ducks as a result of a June 22, 2012, trade that sent Lubomir Visnovsky to the Islanders in exchange for this pick.
- The Anaheim Ducks' second-round pick went to the Edmonton Oilers as the result of a July 12, 2011, trade that sent Andrew Cogliano to the Ducks in exchange for this pick.
- The Anaheim Ducks' fourth-round pick went to the San Jose Sharks (via Toronto and Chicago), Anaheim traded this pick to the Toronto Maple Leafs as the result of a February 9, 2011, trade that sent Francois Beauchemin to the Ducks in exchange for Joffrey Lupul, Jake Gardiner and this pick.
- The Anaheim Ducks' seventh-round pick went to the San Jose Sharks (via Colorado), Anaheim traded this pick to the Colorado Avalanche as the result of an October 8, 2011, trade that sent Kyle Cumiskey to the Ducks in exchange for Jake Newton and this pick.
