= 2013–14 Washington Capitals season =

NHL ice hockey team season

2013–14 Washington Capitals
- Division: 5th Metropolitan
- Conference: 9th Eastern
- 2013–14 record: 38–30–14
- Home record: 21–13–7
- Road record: 17–17–7
- Goals for: 235
- Goals against: 240

Team information
- General manager: George McPhee
- Coach: Adam Oates
- Captain: Alexander Ovechkin
- Alternate captains: Nicklas Backstrom; Mike Green; Brooks Laich
- Arena: Verizon Center
- Average attendance: 18,054 (96.3%) (41 games)
- Minor league affiliates: Hershey Bears (AHL); Reading Royals (ECHL)

Team leaders
- Goals: Alexander Ovechkin (51)
- Assists: Nicklas Backstrom (61)
- Points: Nicklas Backstrom; Alexander Ovechkin (79)
- Penalty minutes: Tom Wilson (151)
- Plus/minus: Steve Oleksy; Joel Ward (+7)
- Wins: Braden Holtby (23)
- Goals against average: Jaroslav Halak (2.31)

The 2013–14 Washington Capitals season was the 40th season for the National Hockey League (NHL) franchise that was established on June 11, 1974. The Capitals failed to make the playoffs for the first time since the 2006–07 season, ending their six-season playoff streak. During this season, the Capitals also set the current NHL record for total shootouts in a season with 21 out of possible 82 games. This would be the last season the Capitals failed to make the playoffs until 2023.

== Standings ==
Metropolitan Division
| Pos | Team | GP | W | L | OTL | ROW | GF | GA | GD | Pts |
|---|---|---|---|---|---|---|---|---|---|---|
| 1 | y – Pittsburgh Penguins | 82 | 51 | 24 | 7 | 44 | 249 | 207 | +42 | 109 |
| 2 | x – New York Rangers | 82 | 45 | 31 | 6 | 41 | 218 | 193 | +25 | 96 |
| 3 | x – Philadelphia Flyers | 82 | 42 | 30 | 10 | 39 | 236 | 235 | +1 | 94 |
| 4 | x – Columbus Blue Jackets | 82 | 43 | 32 | 7 | 38 | 231 | 216 | +15 | 93 |
| 5 | Washington Capitals | 82 | 38 | 30 | 14 | 28 | 235 | 240 | −5 | 90 |
| 6 | New Jersey Devils | 82 | 35 | 29 | 18 | 35 | 197 | 208 | −11 | 88 |
| 7 | Carolina Hurricanes | 82 | 36 | 35 | 11 | 34 | 207 | 230 | −23 | 83 |
| 8 | New York Islanders | 82 | 34 | 37 | 11 | 25 | 225 | 267 | −42 | 79 |

Source: National Hockey League
x – Clinched playoff spot; y – Clinched division

Eastern Conference Wild Card
| Pos | Div | Team | GP | W | L | OTL | ROW | GF | GA | GD | Pts |
|---|---|---|---|---|---|---|---|---|---|---|---|
| 1 | ME | x – Columbus Blue Jackets | 82 | 43 | 32 | 7 | 38 | 231 | 216 | +15 | 93 |
| 2 | AT | x – Detroit Red Wings | 82 | 39 | 28 | 15 | 34 | 222 | 230 | −8 | 93 |
| 3 | ME | Washington Capitals | 82 | 38 | 30 | 14 | 28 | 235 | 240 | −5 | 90 |
| 4 | ME | New Jersey Devils | 82 | 35 | 29 | 18 | 35 | 197 | 208 | −11 | 88 |
| 5 | AT | Ottawa Senators | 82 | 37 | 31 | 14 | 30 | 236 | 265 | −29 | 88 |
| 6 | AT | Toronto Maple Leafs | 82 | 38 | 36 | 8 | 29 | 231 | 256 | −25 | 84 |
| 7 | ME | Carolina Hurricanes | 82 | 36 | 35 | 11 | 34 | 207 | 230 | −23 | 83 |
| 8 | ME | New York Islanders | 82 | 34 | 37 | 11 | 25 | 225 | 267 | −42 | 79 |
| 9 | AT | Florida Panthers | 82 | 29 | 45 | 8 | 21 | 196 | 268 | −72 | 66 |
| 10 | AT | Buffalo Sabres | 82 | 21 | 51 | 10 | 14 | 157 | 248 | −91 | 52 |

Source: National Hockey League
x – Clinched playoff spot

== Schedule and results ==
=== Pre-season ===
2013 preseason game log: 4–0–4 (Home: 2–0–2; Road: 2–0–2)
| # | Date | Visitor | Score | Home | OT | Decision | Attendance | Record | Recap |
|---|---|---|---|---|---|---|---|---|---|
| 1^{[a]} | September 14 | Washington | 4–3 | Winnipeg | SO | Grubauer | 3,257 | 1–0–0 | Recap |
| 2 | September 16 | Washington | 4–3 | Philadelphia | SO | Leggio | 19,142 | 2–0–0 | Recap |
| 3^{[b]} | September 17 | Boston | 3–2 | Washington | SO | Grubauer | 11,286 | 2–0–1 | Recap |
| 4 | September 20 | Chicago | 5–4 | Washington | SO | Leggio | 17,047 | 2–0–2 | Recap |
| 5 | September 23 | Washington | 2–3 | Boston | OT | Holtby | 17,006 | 2–0–3 | Recap |
| 6 | September 25 | Nashville | 1–4 | Washington | | Neuvirth | 16,748 | 3–0–3 | Recap |
| 7 | September 27 | Philadelphia | 3–6 | Washington | | Neuvirth | 17,121 | 4–0–3 | Recap |
| 8 | September 28 | Washington | 3–4 | Chicago | OT | Holtby | 20,650 | 4–0–4 | Recap |
Notes:^{a} Game was played at Yardmen Arena in Belleville, Ontario.^{b} Game was played at 1st Mariner Arena in Baltimore, Maryland.

=== Regular season ===
2013–14 game log

October: 5–7–0 (Home: 3–3–0; Road: 2–4–0)
| # | Date | Visitor | Score | Home | OT | Decision | Attendance | Record | Pts | Recap |
|---|---|---|---|---|---|---|---|---|---|---|
| 1 | October 1 | Washington | 4–6 | Chicago | | Holtby | 22,158 | 0–1–0 | 0 | Recap |
| 2 | October 3 | Calgary | 4–5 | Washington | SO | Neuvirth | 18,506 | 1–1–0 | 2 | Recap |
| 3 | October 5 | Washington | 1–2 | Dallas | | Holtby | 17,200 | 1–2–0 | 2 | Recap |
| 4 | October 10 | Carolina | 3–2 | Washington | | Holtby | 18,506 | 1–3–0 | 2 | Recap |
| 5 | October 12 | Colorado | 5–1 | Washington | | Neuvirth | 18,506 | 1–4–0 | 2 | Recap |
| 6 | October 14 | Edmonton | 2–4 | Washington | | Holtby | 18,506 | 2–4–0 | 4 | Recap |
| 7 | October 16 | NY Rangers | 2–0 | Washington | | Holtby | 18,506 | 2–5–0 | 4 | Recap |
| 8 | October 19 | Columbus | 1–4 | Washington | | Holtby | 18,506 | 3–5–0 | 6 | Recap |
| 9 | October 22 | Washington | 5–4 | Winnipeg | SO | Holtby | 15,004 | 4–5–0 | 8 | Recap |
| 10 | October 24 | Washington | 4–1 | Edmonton | | Holtby | 16,839 | 5–5–0 | 10 | Recap |
| 11 | October 26 | Washington | 2–5 | Calgary | | Holtby | 19,289 | 5–6–0 | 10 | Recap |
| 12 | October 28 | Washington | 2–3 | Vancouver | | Neuvirth | 18,910 | 5–7–0 | 10 | Recap |

November: 9–4–2 (Home: 6–3–0; Road: 3–1–2)
| # | Date | Visitor | Score | Home | OT | Decision | Attendance | Record | Pts | Recap |
|---|---|---|---|---|---|---|---|---|---|---|
| 13 | November 1 | Washington | 7–0 | Philadelphia | | Holtby | 19,702 | 6–7–0 | 12 | Recap |
| 14 | November 2 | Florida | 2–3 | Washington | SO | Neuvirth | 18,506 | 7–7–0 | 14 | Recap |
| 15 | November 5 | NY Islanders | 2–6 | Washington | | Holtby | 18,506 | 8–7–0 | 16 | Recap |
| 16 | November 7 | Minnesota | 2–3 | Washington | SO | Holtby | 18,506 | 9–7–0 | 18 | Recap |
| 17 | November 9 | Washington | 3–4 | Phoenix | SO | Neuvirth | 16,106 | 9–7–1 | 19 | Recap |
| 18 | November 10 | Washington | 1–4 | Colorado | | Holtby | 17,625 | 9–8–1 | 19 | Recap |
| 19 | November 12 | Columbus | 3–4 | Washington | OT | Holtby | 18,506 | 10–8–1 | 21 | Recap |
| 20 | November 15 | Washington | 4–3 | Detroit | SO | Holtby | 20,066 | 11–8–1 | 23 | Recap |
| 21 | November 17 | St. Louis | 1–4 | Washington | | Holtby | 18,506 | 12–8–1 | 25 | Recap |
| 22 | November 20 | Pittsburgh | 4–0 | Washington | | Holtby | 18,506 | 12–9–1 | 25 | Recap |
| 23 | November 22 | Montreal | 3–2 | Washington | | Neuvirth | 18,506 | 12–10–1 | 25 | Recap |
| 24 | November 23 | Washington | 1–2 | Toronto | SO | Holtby | 19,473 | 12–10–2 | 26 | Recap |
| 25 | November 27 | Ottawa | 6–4 | Washington | | Holtby | 18,506 | 12–11–2 | 26 | Recap |
| 26 | November 29 | Montreal | 2–3 | Washington | SO | Holtby | 18,506 | 13–11–2 | 28 | Recap |
| 27 | November 30 | Washington | 3–2 | NY Islanders | OT | Holtby | 14,819 | 14–11–2 | 30 | Recap |

December: 6–4–3 (Home: 4–2–1; Road: 2–2–2)
| # | Date | Visitor | Score | Home | OT | Decision | Attendance | Record | Pts | Recap |
|---|---|---|---|---|---|---|---|---|---|---|
| 28 | December 3 | Carolina | 4–1 | Washington | | Holtby | 18,506 | 14–12–2 | 30 | Recap |
| 29 | December 7 | Nashville | 2–5 | Washington | | Holtby | 18,506 | 15–12–2 | 32 | Recap |
| 30 | December 8 | Washington | 4–1 | NY Rangers | | Grubauer | 18,006 | 16–12–2 | 34 | Recap |
| 31 | December 10 | Tampa Bay | 5–6 | Washington | SO | Grubauer | 18,506 | 17–12–2 | 36 | Recap |
| 32 | December 13 | Washington | 2–3 | Florida | SO | Grubauer | 15,097 | 17–12–3 | 37 | Recap |
| 33 | December 15 | Philadelphia | 4–5 | Washington | SO | Grubauer | 18,506 | 18–12–3 | 39 | Recap |
| 34 | December 17 | Washington | 2–5 | Philadelphia | | Holtby | 19,788 | 18–13–3 | 39 | Recap |
| 35 | December 20 | Washington | 4–2 | Carolina | | Grubauer | 17,737 | 19–13–3 | 41 | Recap |
| 36 | December 21 | New Jersey | 5–4 | Washington | OT | Holtby | 18,506 | 19–13–4 | 42 | Recap |
| 37 | December 23 | Anaheim | 3–2 | Washington | | Grubauer | 18,506 | 19–14–4 | 42 | Recap |
| 38 | December 27 | NY Rangers | 2–3 | Washington | | Grubauer | 18,506 | 20–14–4 | 44 | Recap |
| 39 | December 29 | Washington | 1–2 | Buffalo | SO | Grubauer | 19,070 | 20–14–5 | 45 | Recap |
| 40 | December 30 | Washington | 1–3 | Ottawa | | Grubauer | 20,193 | 20–15–5 | 45 | Recap |

January: 4–7–4 (Home: 1–1–3; Road: 3–6–1)
| # | Date | Visitor | Score | Home | OT | Decision | Attendance | Record | Pts | Recap |
|---|---|---|---|---|---|---|---|---|---|---|
| 41 | January 2 | Carolina | 4–3 | Washington | OT | Grubauer | 18,506 | 20–15–6 | 46 | Recap |
| 42 | January 4 | Washington | 3–5 | Minnesota | | Holtby | 19,022 | 20–16–6 | 46 | Recap |
| 43 | January 9 | Washington | 4–3 | Tampa Bay | | Grubauer | 19,204 | 21–16–6 | 48 | Recap |
| 44 | January 10 | Toronto | 2–3 | Washington | | Neuvirth | 18,506 | 22–16–6 | 50 | Recap |
| 45 | January 12 | Buffalo | 2–1 | Washington | SO | Grubauer | 18,506 | 22–16–7 | 51 | Recap |
| 46 | January 14 | San Jose | 2–1 | Washington | SO | Grubauer | 18,506 | 22–16–8 | 52 | Recap |
| 47 | January 15 | Washington | 3–4 | Pittsburgh | | Neuvirth | 18,667 | 22–17–8 | 52 | Recap |
| 48 | January 17 | Washington | 1–5 | Columbus | | Grubauer | 14,121 | 22–18–8 | 52 | Recap |
| 49 | January 19 | Washington | 1–4 | NY Rangers | | Grubauer | 18,006 | 22–19–8 | 52 | Recap |
| 50 | January 21 | Ottawa | 2–0 | Washington | | Holtby | 18,506 | 22–20–8 | 52 | Recap |
| 51 | January 24 | Washington | 1–2 | New Jersey | | Neuvirth | 15,742 | 22–21–8 | 52 | Recap |
| 52 | January 25 | Washington | 5–0 | Montreal | | Holtby | 21,273 | 23–21–8 | 54 | Recap |
| 53 | January 28 | Washington | 5–4 | Buffalo | OT | Holtby | 18,923 | 24–21–8 | 56 | Recap |
| 54 | January 30 | Washington | 2–5 | Columbus | | Holtby | 16,047 | 24–22–8 | 56 | Recap |
| 55 | January 31 | Washington | 3–4 | Detroit | SO | Neuvirth | 20,066 | 24–22–9 | 57 | Recap |

February: 4–1–0 (Home: 3–1–0; Road: 1–0–0)
| # | Date | Visitor | Score | Home | OT | Decision | Attendance | Record | Pts | Recap |
|---|---|---|---|---|---|---|---|---|---|---|
| 56 | February 2 | Detroit | 5–6 | Washington | OT | Neuvirth | 18,506 | 25–22–9 | 59 | Recap |
| 57 | February 4 | NY Islanders | 1–0 | Washington | | Neuvirth | 18,506 | 25–23–9 | 59 | Recap |
| 58 | February 6 | Winnipeg | 2–4 | Washington | | Holtby | 18,506 | 26–23–9 | 61 | Recap |
| 59 | February 8 | New Jersey | 0–3 | Washington | | Holtby | 18,506 | 27–23–9 | 63 | Recap |
| 60 | February 27 | Washington | 5–4 | Florida | | Holtby | 14,180 | 28–23–9 | 65 | Recap |

March: 6–5–4 (Home: 3–2–2; Road: 3–3–2)
| # | Date | Visitor | Score | Home | OT | Decision | Attendance | Record | Pts | Recap |
|---|---|---|---|---|---|---|---|---|---|---|
| 61 | March 1 | Washington | 4–2 | Boston | | Holtby | 17,565 | 29–23–9 | 67 | Recap |
| 62 | March 2 | Philadelphia | 5–4 | Washington | OT | Holtby | 18,506 | 29–23–10 | 68 | Recap |
| 63 | March 5 | Washington | 4–6 | Philadelphia | | Grubauer | 19,919 | 29–24–10 | 68 | Recap |
| 64 | March 6 | Washington | 0–3 | Boston | | Holtby | 17,565 | 29–25–10 | 68 | Recap |
| 65 | March 8 | Phoenix | 2–3 | Washington | | Halak | 18,506 | 30–25–10 | 70 | Recap |
| 66 | March 10 | Pittsburgh | 3–2 | Washington | | Halak | 18,506 | 30–26–10 | 70 | Recap |
| 67 | March 11 | Washington | 0–2 | Pittsburgh | | Halak | 18,646 | 30–27–10 | 70 | Recap |
| 68 | March 14 | Vancouver | 3–4 | Washington | | Halak | 18,506 | 31–27–10 | 72 | Recap |
| 69 | March 16 | Toronto | 2–4 | Washington | | Halak | 18,506 | 32–27–10 | 74 | Recap |
| 70 | March 18 | Washington | 3–2 | Anaheim | | Halak | 17,174 | 33–27–10 | 76 | Recap |
| 71 | March 20 | Washington | 1–2 | Los Angeles | SO | Halak | 18,118 | 33–27–11 | 77 | Recap |
| 72 | March 22 | Washington | 3–2 | San Jose | SO | Holtby | 17,562 | 34–27–11 | 79 | Recap |
| 73 | March 25 | Los Angeles | 5–4 | Washington | SO | Halak | 18,506 | 34–27–12 | 80 | Recap |
| 74 | March 29 | Boston | 4–2 | Washington | | Holtby | 18,506 | 34–28–12 | 80 | Recap |
| 75 | March 30 | Washington | 3–4 | Nashville | SO | Halak | 16,553 | 34–28–13 | 81 | Recap |

April: 4–2–1 (Home: 1–1–1; Road: 3–1–0)
| # | Date | Visitor | Score | Home | OT | Decision | Attendance | Record | Pts | Recap |
|---|---|---|---|---|---|---|---|---|---|---|
| 76 | April 1 | Dallas | 5–0 | Washington | | Holtby | 18,506 | 34–29–13 | 81 | Recap |
| 77 | April 4 | Washington | 1–2 | New Jersey | | Halak | 15,218 | 34–30–13 | 81 | Recap |
| 78 | April 5 | Washington | 4–3 | NY Islanders | SO | Holtby | 16,008 | 35–30–13 | 83 | Recap |
| 79 | April 8 | Washington | 4–1 | St. Louis | | Holtby | 17,447 | 36–30–13 | 85 | Recap |
| 80 | April 10 | Washington | 5–2 | Carolina | | Holtby | 15,735 | 37–30–13 | 87 | Recap |
| 81 | April 11 | Chicago | 0–4 | Washington | | Halak | 18,506 | 38–30–13 | 89 | Recap |
| 82 | April 13 | Tampa Bay | 1–0 | Washington | SO | Holtby | 18,506 | 38–30–14 | 90 | Recap |

Legend: Win (2 points) Loss (0 points) Overtime/shootout loss (1 point)

== Player statistics ==
Final stats

Skaters

Regular season
| Player | GP | G | A | Pts | +/− | PIM |
|---|---|---|---|---|---|---|
| Alexander Ovechkin | 78 | 51 | 28 | 79 | −35 | 48 |
| Nicklas Backstrom | 82 | 18 | 61 | 79 | −20 | 54 |
| Joel Ward | 82 | 24 | 25 | 49 | 7 | 32 |
| Marcus Johansson | 80 | 8 | 36 | 44 | −21 | 4 |
| Troy Brouwer | 82 | 25 | 18 | 43 | −6 | 92 |
| Jason Chimera | 82 | 15 | 27 | 42 | 4 | 36 |
| Mike Green | 70 | 9 | 29 | 38 | −16 | 64 |
| John Carlson | 82 | 10 | 27 | 37 | −3 | 22 |
| Mikhail Grabovski | 58 | 13 | 22 | 35 | 6 | 26 |
| Eric Fehr | 73 | 13 | 18 | 31 | 0 | 32 |
| Martin Erat^{‡} | 53 | 1 | 23 | 24 | 1 | 22 |
| Karl Alzner | 82 | 2 | 16 | 18 | −7 | 26 |
| Brooks Laich | 51 | 8 | 7 | 15 | −7 | 16 |
| Dmitry Orlov | 54 | 3 | 8 | 11 | −1 | 19 |
| Tom Wilson | 82 | 3 | 7 | 10 | 1 | 151 |
| Steve Oleksy | 33 | 2 | 8 | 10 | 7 | 53 |
| Jay Beagle | 62 | 4 | 5 | 9 | −9 | 28 |
| Evgeny Kuznetsov | 17 | 3 | 6 | 9 | −2 | 6 |
| Nate Schmidt | 29 | 2 | 4 | 6 | 4 | 6 |
| Connor Carrick | 34 | 1 | 5 | 6 | −9 | 23 |
| Michael Latta | 17 | 1 | 3 | 4 | 0 | 12 |
| John Erskine | 37 | 1 | 3 | 4 | −5 | 56 |
| Casey Wellman | 13 | 2 | 1 | 3 | 3 | 0 |
| Dustin Penner^{†} | 18 | 1 | 2 | 3 | 3 | 2 |
| Patrick Wey | 9 | 0 | 3 | 3 | 0 | 5 |
| Aaron Volpatti | 41 | 2 | 0 | 2 | −3 | 49 |
| Alexander Urbom^{‡} | 20 | 1 | 1 | 2 | 1 | 19 |
| Julien Brouillette | 10 | 1 | 1 | 2 | 3 | 0 |
| Chris Brown | 6 | 1 | 1 | 2 | 0 | 0 |
| Tyson Strachan | 18 | 0 | 2 | 2 | −2 | 28 |
| Jack Hillen | 13 | 0 | 1 | 1 | −4 | 4 |
| Ryan Stoa | 3 | 0 | 0 | 0 | −1 | 0 |
| Peter LeBlanc | 1 | 0 | 0 | 0 | 0 | 0 |
| Nicolas Deschamps | 3 | 0 | 0 | 0 | −1 | 0 |
| Cameron Schilling | 1 | 0 | 0 | 0 | −2 | 0 |

Goaltenders

Regular season
| Player | GP | GS | TOI | W | L | OT | GA | GAA | SA | SV% | SO | G | A | PIM |
|---|---|---|---|---|---|---|---|---|---|---|---|---|---|---|
| Braden Holtby | 48 | 45 | 2,656:20 | 23 | 15 | 4 | 126 | 2.85 | 1475 | 0.915 | 4 | 0 | 2 | 7 |
| Philipp Grubauer | 17 | 14 | 883:23 | 6 | 5 | 5 | 35 | 2.38 | 469 | 0.925 | 0 | 0 | 0 | 0 |
| Michal Neuvirth^{‡} | 13 | 11 | 766:57 | 4 | 6 | 2 | 36 | 2.82 | 383 | 0.914 | 0 | 0 | 1 | 0 |
| Jaroslav Halak^{†} | 12 | 12 | 700:32 | 5 | 4 | 3 | 27 | 2.31 | 383 | 0.930 | 1 | 0 | 0 | 0 |

^{†}Denotes player spent time with another team before joining the Capitals. Stats reflect time with the Capitals only.
^{‡}Denotes player was traded mid-season. Stats reflect time with the Capitals only.
Bold/italics denotes franchise record.

== Transactions ==
The Capitals have been involved in the following transactions during the 2013–14 season.

=== Trades ===
| June 30, 2013 | To Winnipeg Jets 3rd-round pick in 2013; 4th-round pick in 2013; CGY's 5th-round pick in 2013 | To Washington Capitals CHI's 2nd-round pick in 2013 |
| September 29, 2013 | To Anaheim Ducks Mathieu Perreault | To Washington Capitals John Mitchell; 4th-round pick in 2014 |
| March 4, 2014 | To Anaheim Ducks ANA's 4th-round pick in 2014 | To Washington Capitals Dustin Penner |
| March 4, 2014 | To Phoenix Coyotes Martin Erat; John Mitchell | To Washington Capitals Chris Brown; Rostislav Klesla; 4th-round pick in 2015 |
| March 5, 2014 | To Buffalo Sabres Michal Neuvirth; Rostislav Klesla | To Washington Capitals Jaroslav Halak; 3rd-round pick in 2015 |
| April 19, 2014 | To Nashville Predators Jaynen Rissling | To Washington Capitals 7th-round pick in 2014 |
| May 1, 2014 | To New York Islanders Jaroslav Halak | To Washington Capitals CHI's 4th-round pick in 2014 |

=== Free agents acquired ===
| Player | Former team | Contract terms |
|---|---|---|
| David Kolomatis | Manchester Monarchs | 1 year, $550,000 |
| Tyson Strachan | Florida Panthers | 1 year, $550,000 |
| Matt Watkins | Bridgeport Sound Tigers | 1 year, $550,000 |
| David Leggio | Rochester Americans | 1 year, $550,000 |
| Brandon Segal | Connecticut Whale | 1 year, $550,000 |
| Mikhail Grabovski | Toronto Maple Leafs | 1 year, $3 million |
| Pheonix Copley | Michigan Tech | 2 years, $1.41 million entry-level contract |

=== Free agents lost ===
| Player | New team | Contract terms |
|---|---|---|
| Wojtek Wolski | Torpedo Nizhny Novgorod | undisclosed |
| Dany Sabourin | Graz 99ers | undisclosed |
| Jeff Schultz | Los Angeles Kings | 1 year, $700,000 |
| Matt Hendricks | Nashville Predators | 4 years, $7.4 million |
| Mike Ribeiro | Phoenix Coyotes | 4 years, $22 million |
| Joey Crabb | Florida Panthers | 2 years, $1.2 million |

=== Claimed via waivers ===
| Player | Previous team | Date |
|---|---|---|
| Alexander Urbom | New Jersey Devils | October 3, 2013 |

=== Lost via waivers ===
| Player | New team | Date |
|---|---|---|
| Alexander Urbom | New Jersey Devils | January 8, 2014 |

=== Player signings ===
| Player | Date | Contract terms |
|---|---|---|
| Tomas Kundratek | July 2, 2013 | 2 years, $1.1 million |
| Karl Alzner | July 10, 2013 | 4 years, $11.2 million |
| Peter LeBlanc | July 10, 2013 | 1 year, $550,000 |
| Nicolas Deschamps | July 22, 2013 | 1 year, $726,000 |
| Andre Burakovsky | September 4, 2013 | 3 years, $2.775 million entry-level contract |
| Marcus Johansson | September 7, 2013 | 2 years, $4 million |
| Connor Carrick | September 23, 2013 | 3 years, $2.35 million entry-level contract |
| Jason Chimera | November 8, 2013 | 2 years, $4 million contract extension |
| Evgeny Kuznetsov | March 8, 2014 | 2 years, $1.8 million entry-level contract |
| Dmitry Orlov | March 13, 2014 | 2 years, $4 million contract extension |
| Caleb Herbert | March 21, 2014 | 2 years, $1.48 million entry-level contract |
| Chandler Stephenson | April 12, 2014 | 3 years, $2.775 million entry-level contract |
| Garrett Mitchell | May 13, 2014 | 1 year, $550,000 |
| Christian Djoos | May 16, 2014 | 3 years, $2.135 million entry-level contract |

== Draft picks ==
Washington Capitals' picks at the 2013 NHL entry draft, which was held in Newark, New Jersey on June 30, 2013.

| Round | # | Player | Pos | Nationality | College/junior/club team (league) |
|---|---|---|---|---|---|
| 1 | 23 | Andre Burakovsky | LW | Sweden | Malmö Redhawks (Swe-2) |
| 2 | 53 | Madison Bowey | D | Canada | Kelowna Rockets (WHL) |
| 3 | 61^{[a]} | Zach Sanford | LW | United States | Islanders Hockey Club (EJHL) |
| 5 | 144 | Blake Heinrich | D | United States | Sioux City Musketeers (USHL) |
| 6 | 174 | Brian Pinho | C | United States | St. John's Prep Eagles (USHS-MA) |
| 7 | 204 | Tyler Lewington | D | Canada | Medicine Hat Tigers (WHL) |

Draft notes

- ^{a} The Chicago Blackhawks' second-round pick went to the Washington Capitals as the result of a trade on June 30, 2013, that sent Washington's third and fourth-round picks in 2013 (84th and 114th overall) and Calgary's fifth-round pick in 2013 (127th overall) to Winnipeg in exchange for this pick.
  Winnipeg previously acquired this pick as the result of a trade on June 30, 2013 that sent Johnny Oduya to Chicago in exchange for Chicago's third-round pick in 2013 and this pick.
- The Washington Capitals' third-round pick went to the Winnipeg Jets as the result of a trade on June 30, 2013, that sent Chicago's second-round pick in 2013 (61st overall) to Washington in exchange for a fourth-round pick in 2013 (114th overall), Calgary's fifth-round pick in 2013 (127th overall) and this pick.
- The Washington Capitals' fourth-round pick went to the Winnipeg Jets as the result of a trade on June 30, 2013, that sent Chicago's second-round pick in 2013 (61st overall) to Washington in exchange for a third-round pick in 2013 (84th overall), Calgary's fifth-round pick in 2013 (127th overall) and this pick.
- The Calgary Flames' fifth-round pick went to the Winnipeg Jets as the result of a trade on June 30, 2013, that sent Chicago's second-round pick in 2013 (61st overall) to Washington in exchange for a third and fourth-round pick in 2013 (84th and 114th overall) and this pick.
  Washington previously acquired this pick as the result of a trade on June 27, 2012, that sent Dennis Wideman to Calgary in exchange for Jordan Henry and this pick.
