= 2013–14 Dallas Stars season =

National Hockey League team season

2013–14 Dallas Stars
- Division: 5th Central
- Conference: 8th Western
- 2013–14 record: 40–31–11
- Home record: 23–11–7
- Road record: 17–20–4
- Goals for: 235
- Goals against: 228

Team information
- General manager: Jim Nill
- Coach: Lindy Ruff
- Captain: Jamie Benn
- Alternate captains: Shawn Horcoff (Dec.–Apr.); Stephane Robidas (Oct.–Mar.); Ray Whitney
- Arena: American Airlines Center
- Average attendance: 14,658 (87.1%) (41 games)
- Minor league affiliates: Texas Stars (AHL); Idaho Steelheads (ECHL); Allen Americans (CHL)

Team leaders
- Goals: Tyler Seguin (37)
- Assists: Tyler Seguin (47)
- Points: Tyler Seguin (84)
- Penalty minutes: Antoine Roussel (209)
- Plus/minus: Jamie Benn (+21)
- Wins: Kari Lehtonen (33)
- Goals against average: Kari Lehtonen (2.41)

The 2013–14 Dallas Stars season was the 47th season for the National Hockey League (NHL) franchise that was established on June 5, 1967, and 21st season since the franchise relocated to Dallas to start the 1993–94 NHL season. On April 11, 2014, the Stars beat the St. Louis Blues 3–0 to clinch a playoff spot for the first time since the 2007–08 season.

== Off-season ==
The Stars unveiled a new logo and jersey at an event on June 4, 2013. They also announced that the organization will retire Mike Modano's # 9 jersey on March 8, 2014 before their game versus the Minnesota Wild.

The Stars hired Lindy Ruff as their new head coach on June 21, 2013.

The Stars promoted Jamie Benn to Captain on September 19, 2013, filling the vacancy created when Brenden Morrow was traded to the Pittsburgh Penguins during the prior season.

== Standings ==
Central Division
Pos	Team	GP	W	L	OTL	ROW	GF	GA	GD	Pts
1	y – Colorado Avalanche	82	52	22	8	47	250	220	+30	112
2	x – St. Louis Blues	82	52	23	7	43	248	191	+57	111
3	x – Chicago Blackhawks	82	46	21	15	40	267	220	+47	107
4	Minnesota Wild	82	43	27	12	35	207	206	+1	98
5	Dallas Stars	82	40	31	11	36	235	228	+7	91
6	Nashville Predators	82	38	32	12	36	216	242	−26	88
7	Winnipeg Jets	82	37	35	10	29	227	237	−10	84

Source: National Hockey League
x – Clinched playoff spot; y – Clinched division

Western Conference Wild Card
Pos	Div	Team	GP	W	L	OTL	ROW	GF	GA	GD	Pts
1	CE	x – Minnesota Wild	82	43	27	12	35	207	206	+1	98
2	CE	x – Dallas Stars	82	40	31	11	36	235	228	+7	91
3	PA	Phoenix Coyotes	82	37	30	15	31	216	231	−15	89
4	CE	Nashville Predators	82	38	32	12	36	216	242	−26	88
5	CE	Winnipeg Jets	82	37	35	10	29	227	237	−10	84
6	PA	Vancouver Canucks	82	36	35	11	31	196	223	−27	83
7	PA	Calgary Flames	82	35	40	7	28	209	241	−32	77
8	PA	Edmonton Oilers	82	29	44	9	25	203	270	−67	67

Source: National Hockey League
x – Clinched playoff spot

== Schedule and results ==
=== Pre-season ===
2013 preseason game log: 5–0–2 (Home: 2–0–1; Road: 3–0–1)
#	Date	Visitor	Score	Home	OT	Decision	Attendance	Record	Recap
1	September 15	St. Louis	6–5	Dallas	SO	Campbell	7,056	0–0–1	Recap
2	September 18	Florida	2–3	Dallas	SO	Nilstorp	6,532	1–0–1	Recap
3^{[a]}	September 20	Dallas	4–1	Florida		Ellis		2–0–1	Recap
4	September 21	Dallas	2–3	St. Louis	OT	Lehtonen	13,028	2–0–2	Recap
5	September 24	Dallas	5–3	Colorado		Lehtonen	10,000	3–0–2	Recap
6	September 26	Colorado	1–5	Dallas		Lehtonen	6,590	4–0–2	Recap
7^{[b]}	September 27	Dallas	4–0	Edmonton		Ellis	8,841	5–0–2	Recap
Notes:^{a} Game was played at AT&T Center in San Antonio, Texas.^{b} Game was played at Cox Convention Center in Oklahoma City, Oklahoma.

=== Regular season ===
2013–14 Game Log

October: 5–6–1 (Home: 3–1–1; Road: 2–5–0)
#	Date	Visitor	Score	Home	OT	Decision	Attendance	Record	Pts	Recap
1	October 3	Florida	4–2	Dallas		Lehtonen	16,100	0–1–0	0	Recap
2	October 5	Washington	1–2	Dallas		Lehtonen	17,200	1–1–0	2	Recap
3	October 11	Dallas	4–1	Winnipeg		Lehtonen	15,004	2–1–0	4	Recap
4	October 12	Dallas	1–5	Minnesota		Ellis	18,278	2–2–0	4	Recap
5	October 15	Dallas	2–3	Colorado		Ellis	15,208	2–3–0	4	Recap
6	October 17	San Jose	3–4	Dallas	SO	Ellis	14,898	3–3–0	6	Recap
7	October 19	Dallas	2–5	Los Angeles		Ellis	18,118	3–4–0	6	Recap
8	October 20	Dallas	3–6	Anaheim		Campbell	14,531	3–5–0	6	Recap
9	October 24	Calgary	1–5	Dallas		Lehtonen	13,122	4–5–0	8	Recap
10	October 26	Winnipeg	2–1	Dallas	SO	Lehtonen	13,875	4–5–1	9	Recap
11	October 28	Dallas	4–3	Buffalo		Lehtonen	18,295	5–5–1	11	Recap
12	October 29	Dallas	1–2	Montreal		Lehtonen	21,273	5–6–1	11	Recap

November: 7–3–2 (Home: 1–2–2; Road: 6–1–0)
#	Date	Visitor	Score	Home	OT	Decision	Attendance	Record	Pts	Recap
13	November 1	Colorado	3–2	Dallas	OT	Lehtonen	15,223	5–6–2	12	Recap
14	November 3	Dallas	4–3	Ottawa	SO	Lehtonen	18,106	6–6–2	14	Recap
15	November 5	Dallas	3–2	Boston	SO	Lehtonen	17,565	7–6–2	16	Recap
16	November 7	Dallas	4–3	Detroit	OT	Lehtonen	20,066	8–6–2	18	Recap
17	November 9	Chicago	5–2	Dallas		Lehtonen	17,167	8–7–2	18	Recap
18	November 13	Dallas	3–0	Edmonton		Lehtonen	16,839	9–7–2	20	Recap
19	November 14	Dallas	7–3	Calgary		Lehtonen	19,289	10–7–2	22	Recap
20	November 17	Dallas	2–1	Vancouver		Lehtonen	18,910	11–7–2	24	Recap
21	November 21	NY Rangers	3–2	Dallas		Lehtonen	15,127	11–8–2	24	Recap
22	November 23	Dallas	1–6	St. Louis		Lehtonen	18,037	11–9–2	24	Recap
23	November 26	Anaheim	3–6	Dallas		Ellis	15,792	12–9–2	26	Recap
24	November 29	Chicago	2–1	Dallas	SO	Lehtonen	18,532	12–9–3	27	Recap

December: 8–3–4 (Home: 5–1–2; Road: 3–2–2)
#	Date	Visitor	Score	Home	OT	Decision	Attendance	Record	Pts	Recap
25	December 1	Edmonton	3–2	Dallas	SO	Lehtonen	12,673	12–9–4	28	Recap
26	December 3	Dallas	4–3	Chicago		Lehtonen	21,411	13–9–4	30	Recap
27	December 5	Dallas	2–3	Toronto	OT	Lehtonen	19,164	13–9–5	31	Recap
28	December 7	Philadelphia	1–5	Dallas		Ellis	8,567	14–9–5	33	Recap
29	December 10	Chicago	6–2	Dallas		Lehtonen	12,542	14–10–5	33	Recap
30	December 12	Dallas	1–3	Nashville		Lehtonen	16,347	14–11–5	33	Recap
31	December 14	Dallas	6–4	Winnipeg		Lehtonen	15,004	15–11–5	35	Recap
32	December 16	Dallas	2–6	Colorado		Lehtonen	13,915	15–12–5	35	Recap
33	December 17	Colorado	2–3	Dallas		Ellis	15,143	16–12–5	37	Recap
34	December 19	Vancouver	1–4	Dallas		Lehtonen	15,644	17–12–5	39	Recap
35	December 21	Dallas	2–3	San Jose	SO	Lehtonen	17,562	17–12–6	40	Recap
36	December 23	Dallas	5–2	Los Angeles		Lehtonen	18,274	18–12–6	42	Recap
37	December 27	Nashville	1–4	Dallas		Lehtonen	17,197	19–12–6	44	Recap
38	December 29	St. Louis	3–2	Dallas	OT	Lehtonen	15,678	19–12–7	45	Recap
39	December 31	Los Angeles	2–3	Dallas		Lehtonen	15,610	20–12–7	47	Recap

January: 4–9–2 (Home: 4–5–1; Road: 0–4–1)
#	Date	Visitor	Score	Home	OT	Decision	Attendance	Record	Pts	Recap
40	January 2	Montreal	6–4	Dallas		Lehtonen	13,007	20–13–7	47	Recap
41	January 4	Detroit	5–1	Dallas		Ellis	17,232	20–14–7	47	Recap
42	January 6	Dallas	3–7	NY Islanders		Lehtonen	11,111	20–15–7	47	Recap
43	January 9	Dallas	0–1	New Jersey		Lehtonen	14,252	20–16–7	47	Recap
44	January 10	Dallas	2–3	NY Rangers		Lehtonen	18,006	20–17–7	47	Recap
45	January 12	NY Islanders	4–2	Dallas		Ellis	13,765	20–18–7	47	Recap
46	January 14	Edmonton	2–5	Dallas		Lehtonen	12,823	21–18–7	49	Recap
47	January 16	Boston	4–2	Dallas		Lehtonen	16,890	21–19–7	49	Recap
48	January 18	Dallas	2–3	Minnesota	OT	Lehtonen	19,192	21–19–8	50	Recap
49	January 20	Dallas	1–4	Nashville		Lehtonen	16,190	21–20–8	50	Recap
50	January 21	Minnesota	0–4	Dallas		Lehtonen	11,191	22–20–8	52	Recap
51	January 23	Toronto	1–7	Dallas		Lehtonen	13,678	23–20–8	54	Recap
52	January 25	Pittsburgh	0–3	Dallas		Lehtonen	18,532	24–20–8	56	Recap
53	January 27	Colorado	4–3	Dallas		Lehtonen	11,678	24–21–8	56	Recap
54	January 30	New Jersey	3–2	Dallas	OT	Lehtonen	14,237	24–21–9	57	Recap

February: 4–0–1 (Home: 2–0–0; Road: 2–0–1)
#	Date	Visitor	Score	Home	OT	Decision	Attendance	Record	Pts	Recap
55	February 1	Dallas	2–0	Anaheim		Ellis	17,174	25–21–9	59	Recap
56	February 4	Dallas	3–1	Phoenix		Lehtonen	12,257	26–21–9	61	Recap
57	February 5	Dallas	1–2	San Jose	OT	Lehtonen	17,562	26–21–10	62	Recap
58	February 8	Phoenix	1–2	Dallas		Lehtonen	18,532	27–21–10	64	Recap
59	February 27	Carolina	1–4	Dallas		Lehtonen	16,122	28–21–10	66	Recap

March: 8–5–1 (Home: 6–1–1; Road: 2–4–0)
#	Date	Visitor	Score	Home	OT	Decision	Attendance	Record	Pts	Recap
60	March 1	Tampa Bay	4–2	Dallas		Lehtonen	15,897	28–22–10	66	Recap
61	March 3	Buffalo	2–3	Dallas		Lehtonen	14,235	29–22–10	68	Recap
62	March 4	Dallas	2–4	Columbus		Ellis	15,661	29–23–10	68	Recap
63	March 6	Vancouver	1–6	Dallas		Lehtonen	14,634	30–23–10	70	Recap
64	March 8	Minnesota	3–4	Dallas		Lehtonen	19,109	31–23–10	72	Recap
–	March 10	Columbus		Dallas	Game rescheduled to April 9. See note. (Note: Six minutes into the Blue Jackets vs. Stars game on March 10, Stars forward Rich Peverley collapsed on the Dallas bench due to a cardiac incident. Shortly afterwards, the two teams decided to postpone the game, due to the emotional effects Peverley's collapse had on players and coaches of both teams. At the time of postponement, the Blue Jackets held a 1–0 lead due to a goal by Nathan Horton, with assists from Matt Calvert and James Wisniewski. The NHL later decided that the game should be replayed on April 9 in its entirety (full 60 minutes of regulation, plus any time, if necessary, for overtime or shootout). However, Columbus will be allowed to start the game with the 1–0 lead it had at the time of the original game's postponement. All statistics from the March 10 game will be expunged from NHL records, except for Horton's goal and its assists.)
65	March 11	Dallas	3–2	St. Louis	OT	Thomas	16,763	32–23–10	74	Recap
66	March 14	Calgary	4–3	Dallas	SO	Thomas	18,532	32–23–11	75	Recap
67	March 16	Dallas	2–7	Winnipeg		Nilstorp	15,004	32–24–11	75	Recap
68	March 18	Dallas	1–5	Pittsburgh		Lehtonen	18,659	32–25–11	75	Recap
69	March 20	Dallas	2–4	Philadelphia		Thomas	19,831	32–26–11	75	Recap
70	March 22	Ottawa	1–3	Dallas		Lehtonen	16,714	33–26–11	77	Recap
71	March 24	Winnipeg	1–2	Dallas		Lehtonen	15,967	34–26–11	79	Recap
72	March 25	Dallas	2–4	Chicago		Lehtonen	21,493	34–27–11	79	Recap
73	March 28	Nashville	3–7	Dallas		Lehtonen	18,532	35–27–11	81	Recap
74	March 29	Dallas	4–2	St. Louis		Lehtonen	19,703	36–27–11	83	Recap

April: 4–4–0 (Home: 2–1–0; Road: 2–3–0)
#	Date	Visitor	Score	Home	OT	Decision	Attendance	Record	Pts	Recap
75	April 1	Dallas	5–0	Washington		Lehtonen	18,506	37–27–11	85	Recap
76	April 3	Dallas	1–4	Carolina		Thomas	15,730	37–28–11	85	Recap
77	April 5	Dallas	5–2	Tampa Bay		Lehtonen	19,204	38–28–11	87	Recap
78	April 6	Dallas	2–3	Florida		Lehtonen	13,366	38–29–11	87	Recap
79	April 8	Nashville	2–3	Dallas	SO	Lehtonen	16,219	39–29–11	89	Recap
80	April 9	Columbus	3–1	Dallas		Thomas	16,125	39–30–11	89	Recap
81	April 11	St. Louis	0–3	Dallas		Lehtonen	18,532	40–30–11	91	Recap
82	April 13	Dallas	1–2	Phoenix		Thomas	15,146	40–31–11	91	Recap

Legend: Win (2 points) Loss (0 points) Overtime/shootout loss (1 point)

== Playoffs ==
The Dallas Stars entered the playoffs as the Western Conference's second wild card and eighth seed. They were defeated by the top-seeded Anaheim Ducks in the first round in six games.

2014 Stanley Cup Playoffs

Western Conference First Round vs. (P1) Anaheim Ducks: Anaheim won series 4–2
#	Date	Visitor	Score	Home	OT	Decision	Attendance	Series	Recap
1	April 16	Dallas	3–4	Anaheim		Lehtonen	17,294	0–1	Recap
2	April 18	Dallas	2–3	Anaheim		Lehtonen	17,426	0–2	Recap
3	April 21	Anaheim	0–3	Dallas		Lehtonen	19,120	1–2	Recap
4	April 23	Anaheim	2–4	Dallas		Lehtonen	18,962	2–2	Recap
5	April 25	Dallas	2–6	Anaheim		Lehtonen	17,334	2–3	Recap
6	April 27	Anaheim	5–4	Dallas	OT	Lehtonen	19,323	2–4	Recap

Legend: Win Loss

== Player statistics ==
Final Stats

Skaters

Regular season
Player	GP	G	A	Pts	+/−	PIM
Tyler Seguin	80	37	47	84	16	18
Jamie Benn	81	34	45	79	21	64
Alex Goligoski	81	6	36	42	9	28
Cody Eakin	81	16	19	35	−9	36
Alex Chiasson	79	13	22	35	−21	38
Valeri Nichushkin	79	14	20	34	20	8
Ryan Garbutt	75	17	15	32	10	106
Ray Whitney	69	9	23	32	−6	14
Rich Peverley	62	7	23	30	−3	15
Erik Cole	75	16	13	29	−17	20
Antoine Roussel	81	14	15	29	−1	209
Trevor Daley	67	9	16	25	10	38
Vernon Fiddler	76	6	17	23	3	37
Sergei Gonchar	76	2	20	22	−12	20
Shawn Horcoff	77	7	13	20	1	52
Jordie Benn	78	3	17	20	16	30
Brenden Dillon	80	6	11	17	9	86
Colton Sceviour	26	8	4	12	−3	4
Kevin Connauton	36	1	7	8	−6	16
Stephane Robidas^{‡}	24	4	1	5	7	12
Dustin Jeffrey	24	2	1	3	−2	0
Lane MacDermid^{‡}	6	0	2	2	2	5
Maxime Fortunus	1	0	1	1	1	0
Aaron Rome	25	0	1	1	−6	11
Travis Morin	4	0	1	1	2	0
Chris Mueller	9	0	0	0	−2	0
Cameron Gaunce	9	0	0	0	1	7
Patrik Nemeth	8	0	0	0	−3	6
Jamie Oleksiak	7	0	0	0	−3	2

Playoffs
Player	GP	G	A	Pts	+/−	PIM
Shawn Horcoff	6	1	5	6	5	5
Jamie Benn	6	4	1	5	1	4
Trevor Daley	6	2	3	5	5	16
Cody Eakin	6	2	3	5	2	0
Alex Goligoski	6	1	3	4	7	8
Ryan Garbutt	6	3	0	3	2	25
Vernon Fiddler	6	1	2	3	−1	24
Colton Sceviour	6	1	2	3	2	0
Tyler Seguin	6	1	2	3	1	0
Jordie Benn	6	0	3	3	1	2
Antoine Roussel	6	0	3	3	3	27
Valeri Nichushkin	6	1	1	2	1	2
Alex Chiasson	6	1	1	2	−7	2
Ray Whitney	5	0	0	0	−1	0
Sergei Gonchar	6	0	0	0	−3	4
Erik Cole	3	0	0	0	−3	2
Aaron Rome	1	0	0	0	−1	0
Chris Mueller	4	0	0	0	−2	2
Kevin Connauton	4	0	0	0	0	16
Brenden Dillon	2	0	0	0	−2	2
Patrik Nemeth	5	0	0	0	−2	12

Goaltenders

Regular season
Player	GP	GS	TOI	W	L	OT	GA	GAA	SA	SV%	SO	G	A	PIM
Kari Lehtonen	65	64	3804	33	20	10	153	2.41	1888	.919	5	0	4	4
Dan Ellis^{‡}	14	11	690	5	6	0	35	3.04	349	.900	1	0	1	0
Tim Thomas^{†}	8	6	364	2	4	1	18	2.97	184	.902	0	0	0	0
Jack Campbell	1	1	60	0	1	0	6	6.00	47	.872	0	0	0	0
Cristopher Nilstorp	1	0	39	0	0	0	3	4.62	17	.824	0	0	0	0

Playoffs
Player	GP	GS	TOI	W	L	GA	GAA	SA	SV%	SO	G	A	PIM
Kari Lehtonen	6	6	346	2	4	19	3.29	165	.885	1	0	1	0
Tim Thomas	1	0	15	0	0	1	4.00	2	.500	0	0	0	0

^{†}Denotes player spent time with another team before joining the Stars. Stats reflect time with the Stars only.
^{‡}Traded mid-season
Bold/italics denotes franchise record

=== Milestones ===
Regular season
Player	Milestone	Reached
Valeri Nichushkin	1st Career NHL Game	October 3, 2013
Valeri Nichushkin	1st Career NHL Assist; 1st career NHL Point	October 20, 2013
Kevin Connauton	1st Career NHL Game	October 24, 2013
Valeri Nichushkin	1st Career NHL Goal	November 3, 2013
Tyler Seguin	1st Career NHL 4 Goal Game	November 14, 2013
Jamie Benn	1st Career NHL 6 Point Game	November 14, 2013
Sergei Gonchar	1,200th Career NHL Game	November 26, 2013
Kari Lehtonen	400th Career NHL Game	December 3, 2013
Kevin Connauton	1st Career NHL Assist; 1st Career NHL Point	December 5, 2013
Colton Sceviour	1st Career NHL Goal	December 14, 2013
Kevin Connauton	1st Career NHL Goal	December 16, 2013
Jamie Benn	300th Career NHL Game	December 29, 2013
Ray Whitney	1,300th Career NHL Game	January 14, 2014
Jamie Benn	100th Career NHL Goal	January 23, 2014
Kari Lehtonen	200th Career NHL Win	January 23, 2014
Erik Cole	800th Career NHL Game	January 23, 2014
Brenden Dillon	100th Career NHL Game	January 23, 2014
Ryan Garbutt	100th Career NHL Game	January 23, 2014
Tyler Seguin	100th Career NHL Assist	March 6, 2014
Patrik Nemeth	1st Career NHL Game	April 1, 2014
Tyler Seguin	200th Career NHL Point	April 5, 2014

== Transactions ==
The Stars have been involved in the following transactions during the 2013–14 season:

=== Trades ===
July 4, 2013	To Boston Bruins Loui Eriksson; Reilly Smith; Matt Fraser; Joe Morrow	To Dallas Stars Tyler Seguin; Rich Peverley; Ryan Button
July 5, 2013	To Edmonton Oilers Philip Larsen; 7th-round pick in 2016	To Dallas Stars Shawn Horcoff
November 22, 2013	To Calgary Flames Lane MacDermid	To Dallas Stars 6th-round pick in 2014
March 4, 2014	To Anaheim Ducks Stephane Robidas	To Dallas Stars Conditional 4th-round pick in 2014
March 5, 2014	To Florida Panthers Dan Ellis	To Dallas Stars Tim Thomas

=== Free agents signed ===
Player	Former team	Contract terms
Dan Ellis	Carolina Hurricanes	2 years, $1.8 million
Chris Mueller	Nashville Predators	1 year, $600,000
Justin Dowling	Texas Stars	2 years, $1.22 million entry-level contract

=== Free agents lost ===
Player	New team	Contract terms
Eric Nystrom	Nashville Predators	4 years, $10 million
Richard Bachman	Edmonton Oilers	1 year, $625,000

=== Claimed via Waivers ===
Player	Previous team	Date
Dustin Jeffrey	Pittsburgh Penguins	November 17, 2013

=== Lost via Waivers ===
Player	New team	Date
Luke Gazdic	Edmonton Oilers	September 29, 2013

=== Player signings ===
Player	Date	Contract terms
Luke Gazdic	July 2, 2013	1 year, $635,000
Lane MacDermid	July 2, 2013	1 year, $660,000
Jordie Benn	July 3, 2013	3 years, $2.1 million
Valeri Nichushkin	July 6, 2013	3 years, $2.775 million entry-level contract
Ryan Garbutt	January 29, 2014	3 years, $1.8 million contract extension
Colton Sceviour	February 28, 2014	2 years, $1.3 million contract extension
Alex Guptill	March 27, 2014	2 years, $1.63 million entry-level contract
Branden Troock	April 15, 2014	3 years, $1.91 million entry-level contract
Philippe Desrosiers	April 19, 2014	3 years, $2.775 million entry-level contract
Esa Lindell	May 7, 2014	3 years, $2.775 million entry-level contract
Henri Kiviaho	May 23, 2014	3 years, $1.835 million entry-level contract
Jason Dickinson	May 29, 2014	3 years, $2.775 million entry-level contract
Gemel Smith	May 31, 2014	3 years, $2.1 million entry-level contract

== Draft picks ==
Dallas Stars' picks at the 2013 NHL entry draft, to be held in Newark, New Jersey on June 30, 2013.

Round	#	Player	Pos	Nationality	College/Junior/Club team (League)
1	10	Valeri Nichushkin	RW	Russia	HC Dynamo Moscow (KHL)
1	29^{[a]}	Jason Dickinson	C	Canada	Guelph Storm (OHL)
2	40	Remi Elie	LW	Canada	London Knights (OHL)
2	54^{[b]}	Philippe Desrosiers	G	Canada	Rimouski Océanic (QMJHL)
3	68^{[c]}	Niklas Hansson	D	Sweden	Rogle BK J20 (SE)
4	101	Nicholas Paul	LW	Canada	Brampton Battalion (OHL)
5	131	Cole Ully	LW	Canada	Kamloops Blazers (WHL)
5	149^{[d]}	Matej Paulovic	LW	Slovakia	Farjestad BK J20 (SE)
7	182^{[e]}	Aleksi Makela	D	Finland	Ilves (SM-liiga)

Draft notes

- ^{a} The Boston Bruins' first-round pick went to the Dallas Stars as a result of an April 2, 2013 trade that sent Jaromir Jagr to the Bruins in exchange for Lane MacDermid, Cody Payne and this pick.
- ^{b} The Vancouver Canucks' second-round pick went to the Dallas Stars as a result of an April 2, 2013 trade that sent Derek Roy to the Canucks in exchange for Kevin Connauton and this pick.
- ^{c} The Edmonton Oilers' third-round pick went to the Dallas Stars as a result of a January 14, 2013 trade that sent Mark Fistric to the Oilers in exchange for this pick.
- The Dallas Stars' third-round pick went to the Montreal Canadiens as the result of a February 26, 2013 trade that sent Erik Cole to the Stars in exchange for a Michael Ryder and this pick.
- ^{d} The Pittsburgh Penguins' fifth-round pick went to the Dallas Stars as a result of a March 24, 2013 trade that sent Brenden Morrow and a 2013 third-round pick to the Penguins in exchange for Joe Morrow and this pick.
- The Dallas Stars' sixth-round pick went to the Ottawa Senators as the result of a June 7, 2013 trade that sent the rights to Sergei Gonchar to the Stars in exchange for this pick.
- ^{e} The Florida Panthers' seventh-round pick went to the Dallas Stars as a result of a June 23, 2012 trade that sent a 2012 seventh-round pick to the Panthers in exchange for this pick.
- The Dallas Stars' seventh-round pick went to the Los Angeles Kings as the result of a June 23, 2012 trade that sent a 2012 seventh-round pick to the Stars in exchange for this pick.
