= 2013–14 Winnipeg Jets season =

National Hockey League team season

2013–14 Winnipeg Jets
- Division: 7th Central
- Conference: 11th Western
- 2013–14 record: 37–35–10
- Home record: 18–17–6
- Road record: 19–18–4
- Goals for: 227
- Goals against: 237

Team information
- General manager: Kevin Cheveldayoff
- Coach: Claude Noel (Oct. 1 – Jan. 12); Paul Maurice (Jan. 12 – Apr. 11)
- Captain: Andrew Ladd
- Alternate captains: Olli Jokinen; Mark Stuart
- Arena: MTS Centre
- Average attendance: 15,004 (100.0%) (41 games)
- Minor league affiliates: St. John's IceCaps (AHL); Ontario Reign (ECHL)

Team leaders
- Goals: Blake Wheeler (28)
- Assists: Bryan Little (41); Blake Wheeler (41)
- Points: Blake Wheeler (69)
- Penalty minutes: Mark Stuart (83)
- Plus/minus: Mark Stuart (+11)
- Wins: Ondrej Pavelec (22)
- Goals against average: Michael Hutchinson (1.64)

The 2013–14 Winnipeg Jets season was the 31st season of play for the National Hockey League (NHL) franchise that was established on June 22, 1979, and 39th season for the organization overall.

== Regular season ==
The Jets relieved Head Coach Claude Noel of coaching duties on January 12, 2014, and replaced him with Paul Maurice. At the time of the coaching change, the Jets were out of the playoff picture holding a 19–23–5 record. The Jets won their first four games and went 8–2–0 in their first ten games with Maurice, climbing back into the Western Conference playoff hunt.

== Standings ==
Central Division
Pos	Team	GP	W	L	OTL	ROW	GF	GA	GD	Pts
1	y – Colorado Avalanche	82	52	22	8	47	250	220	+30	112
2	x – St. Louis Blues	82	52	23	7	43	248	191	+57	111
3	x – Chicago Blackhawks	82	46	21	15	40	267	220	+47	107
4	Minnesota Wild	82	43	27	12	35	207	206	+1	98
5	Dallas Stars	82	40	31	11	36	235	228	+7	91
6	Nashville Predators	82	38	32	12	36	216	242	−26	88
7	Winnipeg Jets	82	37	35	10	29	227	237	−10	84

Source: National Hockey League
x – Clinched playoff spot; y – Clinched division

Western Conference Wild Card
Pos	Div	Team	GP	W	L	OTL	ROW	GF	GA	GD	Pts
1	CE	x – Minnesota Wild	82	43	27	12	35	207	206	+1	98
2	CE	x – Dallas Stars	82	40	31	11	36	235	228	+7	91
3	PA	Phoenix Coyotes	82	37	30	15	31	216	231	−15	89
4	CE	Nashville Predators	82	38	32	12	36	216	242	−26	88
5	CE	Winnipeg Jets	82	37	35	10	29	227	237	−10	84
6	PA	Vancouver Canucks	82	36	35	11	31	196	223	−27	83
7	PA	Calgary Flames	82	35	40	7	28	209	241	−32	77
8	PA	Edmonton Oilers	82	29	44	9	25	203	270	−67	67

Source: National Hockey League
x – Clinched playoff spot

== Schedule and results ==
=== Pre-season ===
2013 preseason game log: 1–4–3 (Home: 1–2–2; Road: 0–2–1)
#	Date	Visitor	Score	Home	OT	Decision	Attendance	Record	Recap
1^{[a]}	September 14	Washington	4–3	Winnipeg	SO	Pasquale	3,257	0–0–1	Recap
2	September 15	Ottawa	3–1	Winnipeg		Hutchinson	15,004	0–1–1	Recap
3	September 17	Edmonton	2–3	Winnipeg		Pavelec	15,004	1–1–1	Recap
4	September 19	Minnesota	4–1	Winnipeg		Montoya	15,004	1–2–1	Recap
5	September 21	Winnipeg	3–4	Minnesota	SO	Pavelec	16,179	1–2–2	Recap
6	September 23	Winnipeg	1–2	Edmonton		Pasquale	15,794	1–3–2	Recap
7	September 26	Boston	3–2	Winnipeg	OT	Pavelec	15,004	1–3–3	Recap
8^{[b]}	September 27	Winnipeg	0–5	Boston		Montoya	12,500	1–4–3	Recap
Notes:^{a} Game was played at Yardmen Arena in Belleville, Ontario.^{b} Game was played at Credit Union Centre in Saskatoon, Saskatchewan.

=== Regular season ===
2013–14 Game Log

October: 5–7–2 (Home: 3–4–1; Road: 2–3–1)
#	Date	Visitor	Score	Home	OT	Decision	Attendance	Record	Pts	Recap
1	October 1	Winnipeg	5–4	Edmonton		Pavelec	16,839	1–0–0	2	Recap
2	October 4	Los Angeles	3–5	Winnipeg		Pavelec	15,004	2–0–0	4	Recap
3	October 6	Anaheim	3–2	Winnipeg		Pavelec	15,004	2–1–0	4	Recap
4	October 10	Winnipeg	1–2	Minnesota		Pavelec	17,366	2–2–0	4	Recap
5	October 11	Dallas	4–1	Winnipeg		Pavelec	15,004	2–3–0	4	Recap
6	October 13	New Jersey	0–3	Winnipeg		Montoya	15,004	3–3–0	6	Recap
7	October 15	Montreal	3–0	Winnipeg		Pavelec	15,004	3–4–0	6	Recap
8	October 18	St. Louis	3–4	Winnipeg	SO	Pavelec	15,004	4–4–0	8	Recap
9	October 20	Nashville	3–1	Winnipeg		Pavelec	15,004	4–5–0	8	Recap
10	October 22	Washington	5–4	Winnipeg	SO	Pavelec	15,004	4–5–1	9	Recap
11	October 24	Winnipeg	2–3	Nashville	OT	Pavelec	16,075	4–5–2	10	Recap
12	October 26	Winnipeg	2–1	Dallas	SO	Pavelec	13,875	5–5–2	12	Recap
13	October 27	Winnipeg	2–3	Colorado		Montoya	13,927	5–6–2	12	Recap
14	October 29	Winnipeg	2–3	St. Louis		Pavelec	15,287	5–7–2	12	Recap

November: 7–5–2 (Home: 4–2–2; Road: 3–3–0)
#	Date	Visitor	Score	Home	OT	Decision	Attendance	Record	Pts	Recap
15	November 2	Chicago	5–1	Winnipeg		Pavelec	15,004	5–8–2	12	Recap
16	November 4	Detroit	2–4	Winnipeg		Montoya	15,004	6–8–2	14	Recap
17	November 6	Winnipeg	1–4	Chicago		Montoya	21,122	6–9–2	14	Recap
18	November 8	Nashville	0–5	Winnipeg		Pavelec	15,004	7–9–2	16	Recap
19	November 10	San Jose	4–5	Winnipeg	SO	Pavelec	15,004	8–9–2	18	Recap
20	November 12	Winnipeg	3–2	Detroit	SO	Pavelec	20,066	9–9–2	20	Recap
21	November 15	Philadelphia	2–3	Winnipeg	SO	Pavelec	15,004	10–9–2	22	Recap
22	November 17	Winnipeg	1–2	Minnesota		Pavelec	18,283	10–10–2	22	Recap
23	November 18	Calgary	5–4	Winnipeg	SO	Montoya	15,004	10–10–3	23	Recap
24	November 21	Chicago	6–3	Winnipeg		Pavelec	15,004	10–11–3	23	Recap
25	November 23	Minnesota	3–2	Winnipeg	SO	Pavelec	15,004	10–11–4	24	Recap
26	November 25	Winnipeg	3–1	New Jersey		Pavelec	12,253	11–11–4	26	Recap
27	November 27	Winnipeg	3–2	NY Islanders		Montoya	12,008	12–11–4	28	Recap
28	November 29	Winnipeg	1–2	Philadelphia		Pavelec	19,937	12–12–4	28	Recap

December: 7–6–1 (Home: 3–2–1; Road: 4–4–0)
#	Date	Visitor	Score	Home	OT	Decision	Attendance	Record	Pts	Recap
29	December 2	Winnipeg	5–2	NY Rangers		Pavelec	18,006	13–12–4	30	Recap
30	December 5	Winnipeg	2–5	Florida		Pavelec	10,966	13–13–4	30	Recap
31	December 7	Winnipeg	2–1	Tampa Bay	OT	Montoya	18,354	14–13–4	32	Recap
32	December 10	St. Louis	2–1	Winnipeg		Pavelec	15,004	14–14–4	32	Recap
33	December 12	Colorado	4–3	Winnipeg	SO	Pavelec	15,004	14–14–5	33	Recap
34	December 14	Dallas	6–4	Winnipeg		Pavelec	15,004	14–15–5	33	Recap
35	December 16	Winnipeg	3–2	Columbus		Montoya	11,448	15–15–5	35	Recap
36	December 17	Winnipeg	2–4	Buffalo		Pavelec	17,795	15–16–5	35	Recap
37	December 20	Florida	2–5	Winnipeg		Pavelec	15,004	16–16–5	37	Recap
38	December 22	Winnipeg	1–2	Vancouver		Pavelec	18,910	16–17–5	37	Recap
39	December 23	Winnipeg	2–6	Edmonton		Pavelec	16,839	16–18–5	37	Recap
40	December 27	Minnesota	4–6	Winnipeg		Montoya	15,004	17–18–5	39	Recap
41	December 29	Winnipeg	2–1	Colorado	OT	Montoya	17,733	18–18–5	41	Recap
42	December 31	Buffalo	0–3	Winnipeg		Montoya	15,004	19–18–5	43	Recap

January: 7–7–0 (Home: 4–3–0; Road: 3–4–0)
#	Date	Visitor	Score	Home	OT	Decision	Attendance	Record	Pts	Recap
43	January 2	Winnipeg	3–4	Ottawa		Montoya	18,691	19–19–5	43	Recap
44	January 4	Winnipeg	1–4	Boston		Pavelec	17,565	19–20–5	43	Recap
45	January 5	Winnipeg	5–6	Pittsburgh		Montoya	18,652	19–21–5	43	Recap
46	January 7	Tampa Bay	4–2	Winnipeg		Pavelec	15,004	19–22–5	43	Recap
47	January 11	Columbus	6–3	Winnipeg		Pavelec	15,004	19–23–5	43	Recap
48	January 13	Phoenix	1–5	Winnipeg		Pavelec	15,004	20–23–5	45	Recap
49	January 16	Winnipeg	5–2	Calgary		Pavelec	19,289	21–23–5	47	Recap
50	January 18	Edmonton	2–3	Winnipeg	OT	Pavelec	15,004	22–23–5	49	Recap
51	January 21	Winnipeg	3–2	Anaheim		Pavelec	15,046	23–23–5	51	Recap
52	January 23	Winnipeg	0–1	San Jose		Pavelec	17,562	23–24–5	51	Recap
53	January 25	Toronto	4–5	Winnipeg	OT	Pavelec	15,004	24–24–5	53	Recap
54	January 26	Winnipeg	3–1	Chicago		Montoya	21,841	25–24–5	55	Recap
55	January 28	Nashville	4–3	Winnipeg		Pavelec	15,004	25–25–5	55	Recap
56	January 31	Vancouver	3–4	Winnipeg		Pavelec	15,004	26–25–5	57	Recap

February: 3–1–1 (Home: 1–0–0; Road: 2–1–1)
#	Date	Visitor	Score	Home	OT	Decision	Attendance	Record	Pts	Recap
57	February 2	Winnipeg	2–1	Montreal		Montoya	21,273	27–25–5	59	Recap
58	February 4	Winnipeg	2–1	Carolina		Pavelec	14,033	28–25–5	61	Recap
59	February 6	Winnipeg	2–4	Washington		Pavelec	18,506	28–26–5	61	Recap
60	February 8	Winnipeg	3–4	St. Louis	SO	Montoya	19,052	28–26–6	62	Recap
61	February 27	Phoenix	2–3	Winnipeg	SO	Pavelec	15,004	29–26–6	64	Recap

March: 4–7–4 (Home: 2–4–2; Road: 2–3–2)
#	Date	Visitor	Score	Home	OT	Decision	Attendance	Record	Pts	Recap
62	March 1	Winnipeg	3–1	Nashville		Pavelec	17,113	30–26–6	66	Recap
63	March 4	NY Islanders	3–2	Winnipeg	OT	Pavelec	15,004	30–26–7	67	Recap
64	March 6	Los Angeles	3–1	Winnipeg		Pavelec	15,004	30–27–7	67	Recap
65	March 8	Ottawa	5–3	Winnipeg		Pavelec	15,004	30–28–7	67	Recap
66	March 10	Winnipeg	2–3	Colorado	OT	Montoya	15,250	30–28–8	68	Recap
67	March 12	Vancouver	3–2	Winnipeg	SO	Pavelec	15,004	30–28–9	69	Recap
68	March 14	NY Rangers	4–2	Winnipeg		Montoya	15,004	30–29–9	69	Recap
69	March 16	Dallas	2–7	Winnipeg		Montoya	15,004	31–29–9	71	Recap
70	March 17	Winnipeg	1–3	St. Louis		Montoya	16,665	31–30–9	71	Recap
71	March 19	Colorado	4–5	Winnipeg	OT	Montoya	15,004	32–30–9	73	Recap
72	March 22	Carolina	3–2	Winnipeg		Montoya	15,004	32–31–9	73	Recap
73	March 24	Winnipeg	1–2	Dallas		Montoya	15,967	32–32–9	73	Recap
74	March 27	Winnipeg	4–3	San Jose		Montoya	17,562	33–32–9	75	Recap
75	March 29	Winnipeg	2–4	Los Angeles		Pavelec	18,118	33–33–9	75	Recap
76	March 31	Winnipeg	4–5	Anaheim	OT	Pavelec	17,174	33–33–10	76	Recap

April: 4–2–0 (Home: 1–2–0; Road: 3–0–0)
#	Date	Visitor	Score	Home	OT	Decision	Attendance	Record	Pts	Recap
77	April 1	Winnipeg	2–1	Phoenix	SO	Pavelec	13,724	34–33–10	78	Recap
78	April 3	Pittsburgh	4–2	Winnipeg		Pavelec	15,004	34–34–10	78	Recap
79	April 5	Winnipeg	4–2	Toronto		Pavelec	19,544	35–34–10	80	Recap
80	April 7	Minnesota	1–0	Winnipeg		Hutchinson	15,004	35–35–10	80	Recap
81	April 10	Boston	1–2	Winnipeg	SO	Hutchinson	15,004	36–35–10	82	Recap
82	April 11	Winnipeg	5–3	Calgary		Hutchinson	19,289	37–35–10	84	Recap

Legend: Win (2 points) Loss (0 points) Overtime/shootout loss (1 point)

== Player statistics ==
Final Stats

Skaters

Regular season
Player	GP	G	A	Pts	+/−	PIM
Blake Wheeler	82	28	41	69	4	63
Bryan Little	82	23	41	64	8	58
Dustin Byfuglien	78	20	36	56	−20	86
Andrew Ladd	78	23	31	54	8	57
Olli Jokinen	82	18	25	43	−8	62
Michael Frolik	81	15	27	42	8	12
Evander Kane	63	19	22	41	−7	66
Mark Scheifele	63	13	21	34	9	14
Tobias Enstrom	82	10	20	30	−9	56
Jacob Trouba	65	10	19	29	4	43
Devin Setoguchi	75	11	16	27	−7	22
Mark Stuart	69	2	11	13	11	101
Grant Clitsome	32	2	10	12	−5	18
Zach Bogosian	55	3	8	11	3	48
Chris Thorburn	55	2	9	11	0	65
Matthew Halischuk	46	5	5	10	−3	6
Eric O'Dell	30	3	4	7	−2	10
Eric Tangradi	55	3	3	6	−6	21
Keaton Ellerby	51	2	4	6	4	2
Adam Pardy	60	0	6	6	4	38
Anthony Peluso	53	2	3	5	−5	65
Zach Redmond	10	1	2	3	1	0
Paul Postma	20	1	2	3	1	8
Patrice Cormier	9	0	3	3	2	7
Jim Slater	27	1	1	2	−5	8
James Wright	59	0	2	2	−3	15
John Albert	9	1	0	1	−3	0
Carl Klingberg	3	1	0	1	2	0
Ben Chiarot	1	0	0	0	−3	0
Julian Melchiori	1	0	0	0	−1	0

Goaltenders

Regular season
Player	GP	GS	TOI	W	L	OT	GA	GAA	SA	SV%	SO	G	A	PIM
Ondrej Pavelec	57	57	3,247:58	22	26	7	163	3.01	1644	.901	1	0	3	0
Al Montoya	28	22	1,540:04	13	8	3	59	2.30	737	.920	2	0	0	2
Michael Hutchinson	3	3	183:02	2	1	0	5	1.64	88	.943	0	0	0	0

^{†}Denotes player spent time with another team before joining the Jets. Stats reflect time with the Jets only.
^{‡}Traded mid-season. Stats reflect time with the Jets only.
Bold/italics denotes franchise record

== Transactions ==
Winnipeg has been involved in the following transactions during the 2013–14 season.

=== Trades ===
Date	Details
June 30, 2013	To Chicago Blackhawks 3rd-round pick in 2013; 5th-round pick in 2013	To Winnipeg Jets Michael Frolik
June 30, 2013	To Washington Capitals CHI's 2nd-round pick in 2013	To Winnipeg Jets 3rd-round pick in 2013; 4th-round pick in 2013; CGY's 5th-round pick in 2013
July 5, 2013	To Minnesota Wild 2nd-round pick in 2014	To Winnipeg Jets Devin Setoguchi

=== Free agents signed ===
Player	Former team	Contract terms
Jerome Samson	Charlotte Checkers	1 year, $600,000
Andrew Gordon	Vancouver Canucks	1 year, $550,000
Adam Pardy	Buffalo Sabres	1 year, $600,000
Matt Halischuk	Nashville Predators	1 year, $650,000
Michael Hutchinson	Providence Bruins	1 year, $600,000

=== Free agents lost ===
Player	New team	Contract terms
Mike Santorelli	Vancouver Canucks	1 year, $550,000
Alexander Burmistrov	Ak Bars Kazan	2 years
Derek Meech	Dinamo Minsk	1 year
Nik Antropov	Barys Astana	2 years

=== Claimed via waivers ===
Player	Former team	Date claimed off waivers
Keaton Ellerby	Los Angeles Kings	November 2, 2013

=== Lost via waivers ===
Player	New team	Date claimed off waivers

=== Lost via retirement ===
Player

=== Player signings ===
Player	Date	Contract terms
Grant Clitsome	July 2, 2013	3 years, $6.2 million
Al Montoya	July 4, 2013	1 year, $601,000
John Albert	July 6, 2013	1 year, $585,000 entry-level contract
Eric Tangradi	July 16, 2013	2 years, $1.35 million
Patrice Cormier	July 16, 2013	1 year, $575,000
Paul Postma	July 19, 2013	2 years, $1.425 million
Edward Pasquale	July 16, 2013	1 year, $575,000
Zach Redmond	July 20, 2013	1 year, $715,000
Bryan Little	July 22, 2013	5 years, $23.5 million
Anthony Peluso	July 22, 2013	2 years, $1.125 million
Eric O'Dell	July 24, 2013	1 year, $600,000
Blake Wheeler	July 26, 2013	6 years, $33.6 million
Zach Bogosian	July 29, 2013	7 years, $36 million
Brenden Kichton	August 28, 2013	3 years, $1.86 million entry-level contract
JC Lipon	August 29, 2013	3 years, $2.1 million entry-level contract
Scott Kosmachuk	December 19, 2013	3 years, $2.775 million entry-level contract
Eric Comrie	December 24, 2013	3 years, $2.775 million entry-level contract
Nic Petan	December 30, 2013	3 years, $2.775 million entry-level contract
Mark Stuart	March 5, 2014	4 years, $10.5 million contract extension
Connor Hellebuyck	April 5, 2014	3 years, $2.775 million entry-level contract

== Draft picks ==
Winnipeg Jets' picks at the 2013 NHL entry draft, which was held in Newark, New Jersey on June 30, 2013.

Round	#	Player	Pos	Nationality	College/Junior/Club team (League)
1	13	Josh Morrissey	Defence	Canada	Prince Albert Raiders (WHL)
2	43	Nic Petan	Centre	Canada	Portland Winterhawks (WHL)
2	59^{[a]}	Eric Comrie	Goaltender	Canada	Tri-City Americans (WHL)
3	84^{[b]}	Jimmy Lodge	Centre	United States	Saginaw Spirit (OHL)
3	91^{[c]}	JC Lipon	Right wing	Canada	Kamloops Blazers (WHL)
4	104	Andrew Copp	Centre	United States	University of Michigan (CCHA)
4	114^{[d]}	Jan Kostalek	Defence	Czech Republic	Rimouski Océanic (QMJHL)
5	127^{[e]}	Tucker Poolman	Defence	United States	Wichita Falls Wildcats (NAHL)
7	190^{[f]}	Brenden Kichton	Defence	Canada	Spokane Chiefs (WHL)
7	194	Marcus Karlstrom	Defence	Sweden	AIK IF J20 (SE)

Draft notes

- ^{a} The Winnipeg Jets were awarded a compensatory pick on September 20, 2012 for failure to sign 2008 first-round pick, Daultan Leveille.
- The Chicago Blackhawks' second-round pick went to the Washington Capitals as the result of a trade on June 30, 2013 that sent Washington's third and fourth-round picks in 2013 (84th and 114th overall) and Calgary's fifth-round pick in 2013 (127th overall) to Winnipeg in exchange for this pick.
  Winnipeg previously acquired this pick as the result of a trade on June 30, 2013 that sent Johnny Oduya to Chicago in exchange for Chicago's third-round pick in 2013 and this pick.
- The Winnipeg Jets' third-round pick went to the Chicago Blackhawks as the result of a trade on June 30, 2013 that sent Michael Frolik to Winnipeg in exchange for a fifth-round pick in 2013 (134th overall) and this pick.
- ^{b} The Washington Capitals' third-round pick went to the Winnipeg Jets as the result of a trade on June 30, 2013 that sent Chicago's second-round pick in 2013 (61st overall) to Washington in exchange for a fourth-round pick in 2013 (114th overall), Calgary's fifth-round pick in 2013 (127th overall) and this pick.
- ^{c} The Chicago Blackhawks' third-round pick went to the Winnipeg Jets as a result of a February 27, 2012 trade that sent Johnny Oduya to the Blackhawks in exchange for a 2013 second-round pick and this pick.
- ^{d} The Washington Capitals' fourth-round pick went to the Winnipeg Jets as the result of a trade on June 30, 2013 that sent Chicago's second-round pick in 2013 (61st overall) to Washington in exchange for a third-round pick in 2013 (84th overall), Calgary's fifth-round pick in 2013 (127th overall) and this pick.
- ^{e} The Calgary Flames' fifth-round pick went to the Winnipeg Jets as the result of a trade on June 30, 2013 that sent Chicago's second-round pick in 2013 (61st overall) to Washington in exchange for a third and fourth-round pick in 2013 (84th and 114th overall) and this pick.
  Washington previously acquired this pick as the result of a trade on June 27, 2012 that sent Dennis Wideman to Calgary in exchange for Jordan Henry and this pick.
- The Winnipeg Jets' fifth-round pick went to the Chicago Blackhawks as the result of a trade on June 30, 2013 that sent Michael Frolik to Winnipeg in exchange for a third-round pick in 2013 (74th overall) and this pick.
- ^{f} The New Jersey Devils' seventh-round pick went to the Winnipeg Jets as a result of a February 13, 2013 trade that sent Alexei Ponikarovsky to the Devils in exchange for a 2014 fourth-round pick and this pick.
- The Winnipeg Jets' sixth-round pick went to the Pittsburgh Penguins as the result of a trade on February 13, 2013 that sent Eric Tangradi to Winnipeg in exchange for this pick (being conditional at the time of the trade). The condition – Pittsburgh will receive a sixth-round pick in 2013 if Tangradi plays a certain number of games for Winnipeg – the date of conversion in unknown.
