= 2013–14 Nashville Predators season =

Professional ice hockey team season

2013–14 Nashville Predators
- Division: 6th Central
- Conference: 10th Western
- 2013–14 record: 38–32–12
- Home record: 19–17–5
- Road record: 19–15–7
- Goals for: 216
- Goals against: 242

Team information
- General manager: David Poile
- Coach: Barry Trotz
- Captain: Shea Weber
- Alternate captains: Mike Fisher; Patric Hornqvist
- Arena: Bridgestone Arena
- Average attendance: 16,600 (97%) (41 games)
- Minor league affiliates: Milwaukee Admirals (AHL); Cincinnati Cyclones (ECHL)

Team leaders
- Goals: Patric Hornqvist (22)
- Assists: Shea Weber (32)
- Points: Patric Hornqvist; Shea Weber (53)
- Penalty minutes: Richard Clune (152)
- Plus/minus: Craig Smith (+12)
- Wins: Carter Hutton (19)
- Goals against average: Carter Hutton (2.61)

The 2013–14 Nashville Predators season was the club's 16th season in the National Hockey League (NHL). The Predators finished tenth in the Western Conference, failing to qualify for the Stanley Cup playoffs for the second year in a row.

== Regular season ==
After the season ended, it was announced that head coach Barry Trotz's contract would not be extended and a search for a new head coach would begin immediately. Trotz had been offered a different role in the organization, which he declined. Trotz had been the only coach in franchise history.

== Standings ==
Central Division
Pos	Team	GP	W	L	OTL	ROW	GF	GA	GD	Pts
1	y – Colorado Avalanche	82	52	22	8	47	250	220	+30	112
2	x – St. Louis Blues	82	52	23	7	43	248	191	+57	111
3	x – Chicago Blackhawks	82	46	21	15	40	267	220	+47	107
4	Minnesota Wild	82	43	27	12	35	207	206	+1	98
5	Dallas Stars	82	40	31	11	36	235	228	+7	91
6	Nashville Predators	82	38	32	12	36	216	242	−26	88
7	Winnipeg Jets	82	37	35	10	29	227	237	−10	84

Source: National Hockey League
x – Clinched playoff spot; y – Clinched division

Western Conference Wild Card
Pos	Div	Team	GP	W	L	OTL	ROW	GF	GA	GD	Pts
1	CE	x – Minnesota Wild	82	43	27	12	35	207	206	+1	98
2	CE	x – Dallas Stars	82	40	31	11	36	235	228	+7	91
3	PA	Phoenix Coyotes	82	37	30	15	31	216	231	−15	89
4	CE	Nashville Predators	82	38	32	12	36	216	242	−26	88
5	CE	Winnipeg Jets	82	37	35	10	29	227	237	−10	84
6	PA	Vancouver Canucks	82	36	35	11	31	196	223	−27	83
7	PA	Calgary Flames	82	35	40	7	28	209	241	−32	77
8	PA	Edmonton Oilers	82	29	44	9	25	203	270	−67	67

Source: National Hockey League
x – Clinched playoff spot

== Schedule and results ==
=== Pre-season ===
2013 Pre-Season game log: 2–4–1 (home: 2–0–0; road: 0–4–1)
#	Date	Visitor	Score	Home	OT	Decision	Attendance	Record	Recap
1	September 16	Nashville	3–6	Florida		Darling	0	0–1–0	Recap
2	September 16	Nashville	2–3	Florida	OT	Hutton	6,541	0–1–1	Recap
3	September 19	Nashville	1–5	Tampa Bay		Hutton	10,332	0–2–1	Recap
4	September 22	NY Islanders	0–2	Nashville		Rinne	15,502	1–2–1	Recap
5	September 24	Tampa Bay	1–2	Nashville		Mazanec	13,089	2–2–1	Recap
6	September 25	Nashville	1–4	Washington		Hutton	16,748	2–3–1	Recap
7	September 27	Nashville	4–6	NY Islanders		Rinne	9,338	2–4–1	Recap

=== Regular season ===
2013–14 game log

October: 6–5–2 (home: 4–2–1; road: 2–3–1)
#	Date	Visitor	Score	Home	OT	Decision	Attendance	Record	Pts	Recap
1	October 3	Nashville	2–4	St. Louis		Rinne	18,851	0–1–0	0	Recap
2	October 4	Nashville	1–3	Colorado		Rinne	14,494	0–2–0	0	Recap
3	October 8	Minnesota	2–3	Nashville		Rinne	17,196	1–2–0	2	Recap
4	October 10	Toronto	4–0	Nashville		Rinne	16,671	1–3–0	2	Recap
5	October 12	NY Islanders	2–3	Nashville		Rinne	17,113	2–3–0	4	Recap
6	October 15	Florida	3–4	Nashville		Rinne	15,935	3–3–0	6	Recap
7	October 17	Los Angeles	2–1	Nashville	SO	Rinne	16,416	3–3–1	7	Recap
8	October 19	Nashville	2–1	Montreal		Rinne	21,273	4–3–1	9	Recap
9	October 20	Nashville	3–1	Winnipeg		Hutton	15,004	5–3–1	11	Recap
10	October 22	Nashville	0–2	Minnesota		Rinne	17,651	5–4–1	11	Recap
11	October 24	Winnipeg	2–3	Nashville	OT	Hutton	16,075	6–4–1	13	Recap
12	October 26	St. Louis	6–1	Nashville		Hutton	16,681	6–5–1	13	Recap
13	October 31	Nashville	4–5	Phoenix	SO	Hutton	7,401	6–5–2	14	Recap

November: 7–6–1 (home: 2–2–1; road: 5–4–0)
#	Date	Visitor	Score	Home	OT	Decision	Attendance	Record	Pts	Recap
14	November 2	Nashville	4–3	Los Angeles		Hutton	18,118	7–5–2	16	Recap
15	November 6	Nashville	6–4	Colorado		Hutton	14,043	8–5–2	18	Recap
16	November 8	Nashville	0–5	Winnipeg		Hutton	15,004	8–6–2	18	Recap
17	November 10	Nashville	0–5	New Jersey		Hutton	12,964	8–7–2	18	Recap
18	November 12	Nashville	1–3	NY Islanders		Mazanec	12,108	8–8–2	18	Recap
19	November 15	Nashville	1–4	Pittsburgh		Mazanec	18,606	8–9–2	18	Recap
20	November 16	Chicago	2–7	Nashville		Mazanec	17,113	9–9–2	20	Recap
21	November 19	Nashville	2–0	Detroit		Mazanec	20,066	10–9–2	22	Recap
22	November 21	Nashville	4–2	Toronto		Mazanec	19,256	11–9–2	24	Recap
23	November 23	NY Rangers	2–0	Nashville		Mazanec	17,127	11–10–2	24	Recap
24	November 25	Phoenix	2–4	Nashville		Mazanec	15,728	12–10–2	26	Recap
25	November 27	Nashville	4–0	Columbus		Mazanec	11,893	13–10–2	28	Recap
26	November 28	Edmonton	3–0	Nashville		Mazanec	16,279	13–11–2	28	Recap
27	November 30	Philadelphia	3–2	Nashville	SO	Mazanec	17,136	13–11–3	29	Recap

December: 5–7–1 (home: 4–4–1; road: 1–3–0)
#	Date	Visitor	Score	Home	OT	Decision	Attendance	Record	Pts	Recap
28	December 3	Vancouver	3–1	Nashville		Mazanec	15,330	13–12–3	29	Recap
29	December 5	Carolina	5–2	Nashville		Mazanec	15,768	13–13–3	29	Recap
30	December 7	Nashville	2–5	Washington		Mazanec	18,506	13–14–3	29	Recap
31	December 10	Nashville	4–1	NY Rangers		Hutton	18,006	14–14–3	31	Recap
32	December 12	Dallas	1–3	Nashville		Hutton	16,347	15–14–3	33	Recap
33	December 14	San Jose	2–3	Nashville		Hutton	16,243	16–14–3	35	Recap
34	December 17	Chicago	3–1	Nashville		Hutton	16,219	16–15–3	35	Recap
35	December 19	Nashville	2–4	Tampa Bay		Hutton	17,254	16–16–3	35	Recap
36	December 21	Montreal	4–3	Nashville	OT	Hutton	16,095	16–16–4	36	Recap
37	December 23	Boston	6–2	Nashville		Mazanec	17,207	16–17–4	36	Recap
38	December 27	Nashville	1–4	Dallas		Hutton	17,197	16–18–4	36	Recap
39	December 28	Los Angeles	2–3	Nashville		Mazanec	17,113	17–18–4	38	Recap
40	December 30	Detroit	4–6	Nashville		Mazanec	17,212	18–18–4	40	Recap

January: 7–5–4 (home: 4–3–1; road: 3–2–3)
#	Date	Visitor	Score	Home	OT	Decision	Attendance	Record	Pts	Recap
41	January 2	Nashville	2–3	Boston	OT	Mazanec	17,565	18–18–5	41	Recap
42	January 4	Nashville	4–5	Florida	SO	Mazanec	15,796	18–18–6	42	Recap
43	January 5	Nashville	1–2	Carolina		Hutton	13,994	18–19–6	42	Recap
44	January 7	San Jose	2–3	Nashville		Mazanec	15,016	19–19–6	44	Recap
45	January 9	Anaheim	4–3	Nashville		Mazanec	15,892	19–20–6	44	Recap
46	January 11	Ottawa	2–1	Nashville	SO	Mazanec	17,113	19–20–7	45	Recap
47	January 12	Minnesota	4–0	Nashville		Mazanec	16,221	19–21–7	45	Recap
48	January 14	Calgary	2–4	Nashville		Hutton	15,730	20–21–7	47	Recap
49	January 16	Nashville	4–3	Philadelphia	SO	Hutton	19,917	21–21–7	49	Recap
50	January 18	Colorado	5–4	Nashville		Dubnyk	17,113	21–22–7	49	Recap
51	January 20	Dallas	1–4	Nashville		Hutton	16,190	22–22–7	51	Recap
52	January 23	Nashville	2–1	Vancouver		Hutton	18,910	23–22–7	53	Recap
53	January 24	Nashville	4–5	Calgary	SO	Dubnyk	19,289	23–22–8	54	Recap
54	January 26	Nashville	1–5	Edmonton		Hutton	16,839	23–23–8	54	Recap
55	January 28	Nashville	4–3	Winnipeg		Hutton	15,004	24–23–8	56	Recap
56	January 31	New Jersey	2–3	Nashville	OT	Hutton	17,207	25–23–8	58	Recap

February: 1–1–2 (home: 1–1–0; road: 0–0–2)
#	Date	Visitor	Score	Home	OT	Decision	Attendance	Record	Pts	Recap
57	February 1	Nashville	3–4	St. Louis	SO	Hutton	19,358	25–23–9	59	Recap
58	February 6	Nashville	2–3	Minnesota	OT	Hutton	18,766	25–23–10	60	Recap
59	February 8	Anaheim	5–2	Nashville		Hutton	17,139	25–24–10	60	Recap
60	February 27	Tampa Bay	2–3	Nashville		Hutton	17,113	26–24–10	62	Recap

March: 7–8–1 (home: 2–5–1; road: 5–3–0)
#	Date	Visitor	Score	Home	OT	Decision	Attendance	Record	Pts	Recap
61	March 1	Winnipeg	3–1	Nashville		Hutton	17,113	26–25–10	62	Recap
62	March 4	Pittsburgh	3–1	Nashville		Rinne	17,113	26–26–10	62	Recap
63	March 6	St. Louis	2–1	Nashville		Rinne	16,180	26–27–10	62	Recap
64	March 8	Columbus	1–0	Nashville		Rinne	17,113	26–28–10	62	Recap
65	March 10	Nashville	4–3	Ottawa	OT	Rinne	19,063	27–28–10	64	Recap
66	March 11	Nashville	4–1	Buffalo		Hutton	18,659	28–28–10	66	Recap
67	March 14	Nashville	3–2	Chicago		Rinne	22,106	29–28–10	68	Recap
68	March 15	St. Louis	4–1	Nashville		Rinne	17,113	29–29–10	68	Recap
69	March 18	Nashville	1–5	Edmonton		Rinne	16,839	29–30–10	68	Recap
70	March 19	Nashville	0–2	Vancouver		Hutton	18,910	29–31–10	68	Recap
71	March 21	Nashville	6–5	Calgary		Hutton	19,289	30–31–10	70	Recap
72	March 23	Nashville	2–0	Chicago		Rinne	21,727	31–31–10	72	Recap
73	March 25	Colorado	5–4	Nashville	SO	Rinne	16,438	31–31–11	73	Recap
74	March 27	Buffalo	1–6	Nashville		Hutton	16,729	32–31–11	75	Recap
75	March 28	Nashville	3–7	Dallas		Rinne	18,532	32–32–11	75	Recap
76	March 30	Washington	3–4	Nashville	SO	Hutton	16,553	33–32–11	77	Recap

April: 5–0–1 (home: 2–0–0; road: 3–0–1)
#	Date	Visitor	Score	Home	OT	Decision	Attendance	Record	Pts	Recap
77	April 4	Nashville	5-2	Anaheim		Rinne	17,174	34–32–11	79	Recap
78	April 5	Nashville	3-0	San Jose		Hutton	17,562	35–32–11	81	Recap
79	April 8	Nashville	2-3	Dallas	OT	Rinne	16,219	35–32–12	82	Recap
80	April 10	Phoenix	0-2	Nashville		Rinne	17,174	36–32–12	84	Recap
81	April 12	Chicago	5-7	Nashville		Rinne	17,355	37–32–12	86	Recap
82	April 13	Nashville	7-3	Minnesota		Hutton	18,658	38–32–12	88	Recap

Legend: Win (2 points) Loss (0 points) Overtime/shootout loss (1 point)

== Playoffs ==
The 2013-14 season was another disappointing one for the Nashville Predators as they missed the playoffs for the second consecutive year.

== Player stats ==
Final stats

=== Skaters ===
Regular season
Player	GP	G	A	Pts	+/−	PIM
Shea Weber	79	23	33	56	−2	52
Patric Hornqvist	76	22	31	53	1	28
Craig Smith	79	24	28	52	16	22
Mike Fisher	75	20	29	49	−4	60
Roman Josi	72	13	27	40	−2	18
David Legwand^{‡}	62	10	30	40	−8	30
Matt Cullen	77	10	29	39	4	32
Colin Wilson	81	11	22	33	−1	21
Nick Spaling	71	13	19	32	2	14
Ryan Ellis	80	6	21	27	9	24
Gabriel Bourque	74	9	17	26	−5	8
Seth Jones	77	6	19	25	−23	24
Eric Nystrom	79	15	6	21	−25	60
Paul Gaustad	75	10	11	21	−6	61
Viktor Stalberg	70	8	10	18	−14	32
Calle Jarnkrok	12	2	7	9	7	4
Mattias Ekholm	62	1	8	9	−8	10
Richard Clune	58	3	4	7	−7	166
Victor Bartley	50	1	5	6	0	23
Michael Del Zotto^{†}	25	1	4	5	−4	8
Filip Forsberg	13	1	4	5	−8	4
Matt Hendricks^{‡}	44	2	2	4	−5	54
Colton Sissons	17	1	3	4	0	4
Kevin Klein^{‡}	47	1	2	3	−11	21
Simon Moser	6	1	1	2	0	2
Patrick Eaves^{†}	5	0	0	0	−3	0
Joe Piskula	2	0	0	0	1	0
Mark Van Guilder	1	0	0	0	0	0
Taylor Beck	7	0	0	0	−2	6

=== Goaltenders ===
Regular season
Player	GP	GS	TOI	W	L	OT	GA	GAA	SA	SV%	SO	G	A	PIM
Carter Hutton	40	34	2,085:17	20	11	4	91	2.62	1006	.910	1	0	1	2
Marek Mazanec	25	22	1,369:32	8	10	4	64	2.80	650	.902	2	0	0	0
Pekka Rinne	24	24	1,366:49	10	10	3	63	2.77	645	.902	2	0	0	0
Devan Dubnyk^{†‡}	2	2	123:57	0	1	1	9	4.35	60	.850	0	0	0	0
Magnus Hellberg	1	0	12:12	0	0	0	1	5.00	4	.750	0	0	0	0

^{†}Denotes player spent time with another team before joining the Predators. Stats reflect time with the Predators only.
^{‡}Traded mid-season. Stats reflect time with the Predators only.
Bold/italics denotes franchise record

== Transactions ==
The Predators have been involved in the following transactions during the 2013–14 season.

=== Trades ===
Date	Details
June 30, 2013	To St. Louis Blues 4th-round pick in 2013	To Nashville Predators 7th-round pick in 2013; 4th-round pick in 2014
January 15, 2014	To Edmonton Oilers Matt Hendricks	To Nashville Predators Devan Dubnyk
January 22, 2014	To New York Rangers Kevin Klein	To Nashville Predators Michael Del Zotto
March 5, 2014	To Montreal Canadiens Devan Dubnyk	To Nashville Predators Future Considerations
March 5, 2014	To Detroit Red Wings David Legwand	To Nashville Predators Calle Jarnkrok; Patrick Eaves; Conditional 3rd-round pick in 2014
April 19, 2014	To Washington Capitals 7th-round pick in 2014	To Nashville Predators Jaynen Rissling

=== Free agents signed ===
Player	Former team	Contract terms
Viktor Stalberg	Chicago Blackhawks	4 years, $12 million
Matt Cullen	Minnesota Wild	2 years, $7 million
Eric Nystrom	Dallas Stars	4 years, $10 million
Matt Hendricks	Washington Capitals	4 years, $7.4 million
Carter Hutton	Rockford IceHogs	1 year, $550,000
Bryan Rodney	Manchester Monarchs	1 year, $550,000
Simon Moser	SC Bern	1 year, $550,000 entry-level contract
Johan Alm	Skelleftea AIK	2 years, $1.85 million entry-level contract

=== Free agents lost ===
Player	New team	Contract terms
T. J. Brennan	Toronto Maple Leafs	1 year, $600,000
Jeremy Smith	Columbus Blue Jackets	1 year, $550,000
Chris Mueller	Dallas Stars	1 year, $600,000
Matthew Halischuk	Winnipeg Jets	1 year, $650,000
Jonathon Blum	Minnesota Wild	1 year, $650,000
Brandon Yip	Phoenix Coyotes	1 year, $675,000
Hal Gill	Philadelphia Flyers	1 year, $700,000

=== Claimed via waivers ===
Player	Former team	Date claimed off waivers

=== Lost via waivers ===
Player	New team	Date claimed off waivers

=== Player signings ===
Player	Date	Contract terms
Seth Jones	July 10, 2013	3 years, $2.775 million entry-level contract
Richard Clune	July 17, 2013	2 years, $1.7 million
Nick Spaling	July 25, 2013	1 year, $1.5 million
Jonathan-Ismael Diaby	January 2, 2014	3 years, $1.9375 million entry-level contract
Felix Girard	April 15, 2014	3 years, $1.895 million entry-level contract
Garrett Noonan	April 22, 2014	2 years, $1.8 million entry-level contract
Jaynen Rissling	April 22, 2014	3 years, $1.82 million entry-level contract
Pontus Aberg	May 7, 2014	3 years, $2.775 million entry-level contract
Max Gortz	June 2, 2014	3 years, $1.85 million entry-level contract
Carter Hutton	June 2, 2014	2 years, $1.45 million contract extension

== Draft picks ==
Nashville Predators' picks at the 2013 NHL entry draft, which was held in Newark, New Jersey on June 30, 2013.

Round	#	Player	Pos	Nationality	College/Junior/Club team (League)
1	4	Seth Jones	D	United States	Portland Winterhawks (WHL)
3	64^{[a]}	Jonathan-Ismael Diaby	D	Canada	Victoriaville Tigres (QMJHL)
4	95	Felix Girard	C	Canada	Baie-Comeau Drakkar (QMJHL)
4	99^{[b]}	Juuse Saros	G	Finland	HPK (SM-liiga)
5	125	Saku Maenalanen	RW	Finland	Karpat Jr. (Finland-Jr.)
5	140^{[d]}	Teemu Kivihalme	D	United States	Burnsville Blaze (MSHSL)
6	155	Emil Pettersson	C	Sweden	Timra IK (SHL/Swe-2)
6	171^{[e]}	Tommy Veilleux	LW	Canada	Victoriaville Tigres (QMJHL)
7	185	Wade Murphy	RW	Canada	Penticton Vees (BCHL)
7	203^{[f]}	Janne Juvonen	G	Finland	Lahti Pelicans (SM-liiga)

=== Draft notes ===
- The Nashville Predators' second-round pick went to the Montreal Canadiens as the result of a February 27, 2012 trade that sent Andrei Kostitsyn to the Predators in exchange for a 2013 conditional fifth-round pick and this pick.
- ^{a} The Tampa Bay Lightning's third-round pick went to the Nashville Predators as a result of a June 15, 2012 trade that sent Anders Lindback, Kyle Wilson and a 2012 seventh-round pick (#202–Nikita Gusev) to the Lightning in exchange for Sebastien Caron, two 2012 second-round picks (#37–Pontus Aberg, #50–Colton Sissons) and this pick.
- The Nashville Predators' third-round pick went to the New York Rangers as the result of a June 23, 2012 trade that sent a 2012 third-round pick (#89–Brendan Leipsic) to the Predators in exchange for this pick.
- ^{b} The Buffalo Sabres' fourth-round pick went to the Nashville Predators as a result of a February 27, 2012 trade that sent a 2012 first-round pick (#21–Mark Jankowski) to the Sabres in exchange for Paul Gaustad and this pick.
- The Toronto Maple Leafs' fourth-round pick went to the St. Louis Blues as the result of a trade on June 30, 2013 that sent a seventh-round pick in 2013 (203rd overall) and a fourth-round pick in 2014 to Nashville in exchange for this pick.
  Nashville previously acquired this pick as the result of a trade on July 3, 2011 that sent Cody Franson and Matthew Lombardi to Toronto in exchange for Brett Lebda, Robert Slaney and this pick (being conditional at the time of the trade). The condition – Lombardi plays in 60 or more regular season games over the course of the 2011–12 and 2012–13 NHL seasons – was converted on April 3, 2012.
- ^{d} The New York Rangers' fifth-round pick went to the Nashville Predators as a result of a June 23, 2012 trade that sent a 2012 fifth-round pick (#142–Thomas Spelling) to the Rangers in exchange for this pick.
- ^{e} The San Jose Sharks' sixth-round pick went to the Nashville Predators as a result of an April 3, 2013 trade that sent Scott Hannan to the Sharks in exchange for this pick.
- ^{f} The St. Louis Blues' seventh-round pick went to the Nashville Predators as the result of a trade on June 30, 2013 that sent Toronto's fourth-round pick in 2013 (112th overall) to St. Louis in exchange for a fourth-round pick in 2014 and this pick.
