= 2013–14 Minnesota Wild season =

National Hockey League team season

2013–14 Minnesota Wild
- Division: 4th Central
- Conference: 7th Western
- 2013–14 record: 43–27–12
- Home record: 26–10–5
- Road record: 17–17–7
- Goals for: 207
- Goals against: 206

Team information
- General manager: Chuck Fletcher
- Coach: Mike Yeo
- Captain: Mikko Koivu
- Alternate captains: Zach Parise; Ryan Suter
- Arena: Xcel Energy Center
- Average attendance: 18,505 (103.1%) (41 games)
- Minor league affiliates: Iowa Wild (AHL); Orlando Solar Bears (ECHL); Quad City Mallards (CHL)

Team leaders
- Goals: Jason Pominville (30)
- Assists: Mikko Koivu (43)
- Points: Jason Pominville (60)
- Penalty minutes: Clayton Stoner (84)
- Plus/minus: Jared Spurgeon; Ryan Suter (+15)
- Wins: Josh Harding (18)
- Goals against average: Josh Harding (1.66)

The 2013–14 Minnesota Wild season was the 14th season for the National Hockey League (NHL) franchise that was established on June 25, 1997.

== Standings ==
Central Division
Pos	Team	GP	W	L	OTL	ROW	GF	GA	GD	Pts
1	y – Colorado Avalanche	82	52	22	8	47	250	220	+30	112
2	x – St. Louis Blues	82	52	23	7	43	248	191	+57	111
3	x – Chicago Blackhawks	82	46	21	15	40	267	220	+47	107
4	Minnesota Wild	82	43	27	12	35	207	206	+1	98
5	Dallas Stars	82	40	31	11	36	235	228	+7	91
6	Nashville Predators	82	38	32	12	36	216	242	−26	88
7	Winnipeg Jets	82	37	35	10	29	227	237	−10	84

Source: National Hockey League
x – Clinched playoff spot; y – Clinched division

Western Conference Wild Card
Pos	Div	Team	GP	W	L	OTL	ROW	GF	GA	GD	Pts
1	CE	x – Minnesota Wild	82	43	27	12	35	207	206	+1	98
2	CE	x – Dallas Stars	82	40	31	11	36	235	228	+7	91
3	PA	Phoenix Coyotes	82	37	30	15	31	216	231	−15	89
4	CE	Nashville Predators	82	38	32	12	36	216	242	−26	88
5	CE	Winnipeg Jets	82	37	35	10	29	227	237	−10	84
6	PA	Vancouver Canucks	82	36	35	11	31	196	223	−27	83
7	PA	Calgary Flames	82	35	40	7	28	209	241	−32	77
8	PA	Edmonton Oilers	82	29	44	9	25	203	270	−67	67

Source: National Hockey League
x – Clinched playoff spot

== Schedule and results ==
=== Pre-season ===
2013 preseason game log: 4–2–0 (Home: 2–1–0; Road: 2–1–0)
#	Date	Visitor	Score	Home	OT	Decision	Attendance	Record	Recap
1	September 17	Columbus	3–1	Minnesota		Backstrom	17,784	0–1–0
2	September 19	Minnesota	4–1	Winnipeg		Harding	15,004	1–1–0
3	September 21	Winnipeg	3–4	Minnesota	SO	Backstrom	16,179	2–1–0
4	September 23	Minnesota	2–1	Columbus	SO	Harding	10,089	3–1–0
5	September 25	St. Louis	1–3	Minnesota		Backstrom	15,183	4–1–0
6	September 27	Minnesota	1–4	St. Louis		Gustafsson	13,233	4–2–0

=== Regular season ===
2013–14 Game Log

October: 6–4–3 (Home: 4–1–2; Road: 2–3–1)
#	Date	Visitor	Score	Home	OT	Decision	Attendance	Record	Pts	Recap
1	October 3	Los Angeles	3–2	Minnesota	SO	Backstrom	18,511	0–0–1	1
2	October 5	Anaheim	4–3	Minnesota	OT	Backstrom	18,213	0–0–2	2
3	October 8	Minnesota	2–3	Nashville		Harding	17,196	0–1–2	2
4	October 10	Winnipeg	1–2	Minnesota		Harding	17,366	1–1–2	4
5	October 12	Dallas	1–5	Minnesota		Harding	18,278	2–1–2	6
6	October 14	Minnesota	2–1	Buffalo		Harding	18,111	3–1–2	8
7	October 15	Minnesota	1–4	Toronto		Kuemper	19,283	3–2–2	8
8	October 17	Minnesota	1–3	Tampa Bay		Harding	16,454	3–3–2	8
9	October 19	Minnesota	1–2	Florida	SO	Harding	13,081	3–3–3	9
10	October 22	Nashville	0–2	Minnesota		Harding	17,651	4–3–3	11
11	October 24	Carolina	1–3	Minnesota		Harding	17,668	5–3–3	13
12	October 26	Minnesota	5–3	Chicago		Backstrom	21,521	6–3–3	15
13	October 28	Chicago	5–1	Minnesota		Backstrom	18,685	6–4–3	15

November: 9–4–2 (Home: 6–2–0; Road: 3–2–2)
#	Date	Visitor	Score	Home	OT	Decision	Attendance	Record	Pts	Recap
14	November 1	Montreal	3–4	Minnesota		Harding	18,207	7–4–3	17
15	November 3	New Jersey	0–4	Minnesota		Harding	17,571	8–4–3	19
16	November 5	Calgary	1–5	Minnesota		Harding	17,708	9–4–3	21
17	November 7	Minnesota	2–3	Washington	SO	Harding	18,506	9–4–4	22
18	November 9	Minnesota	3–2	Carolina	SO	Harding	14,704	10–4–4	24
19	November 13	Toronto	1–2	Minnesota	SO	Harding	17,897	11–4–4	26
20	November 15	Florida	2–3	Minnesota		Harding	18,102	12–4–4	28
21	November 17	Winnipeg	1–2	Minnesota		Harding	18,283	13–4–4	30
22	November 19	Minnesota	2–6	Montreal		Harding	21,273	13–5–4	30
23	November 20	Minnesota	4–3	Ottawa		Harding	16,642	14–5–4	32
24	November 23	Minnesota	3–2	Winnipeg	SO	Backstrom	15,004	15–5–4	34
25	November 25	Minnesota	0–3	St. Louis		Backstrom	15,832	15–6–4	34
26	November 27	Phoenix	3–1	Minnesota		Backstrom	18,265	15–7–4	34
27	November 29	Colorado	3–1	Minnesota		Harding	19,081	15–8–4	34
28	November 30	Minnesota	2–3	Colorado	SO	Harding	17,857	15–8–5	35

December: 5–9–0 (Home: 4–2–0; Road: 1–7–0)
#	Date	Visitor	Score	Home	OT	Decision	Attendance	Record	Pts	Recap
29	December 2	Philadelphia	0–2	Minnesota		Harding	17,676	16–8–5	37
30	December 5	Chicago	3–4	Minnesota		Harding	18,852	17–8–5	39
31	December 6	Minnesota	0–4	Columbus		Backstrom	11,319	17–9–5	39
32	December 8	San Jose	1–3	Minnesota		Harding	18,411	18–9–5	41
33	December 11	Minnesota	1–2	Anaheim		Harding	15,252	18–10–5	41
34	December 12	Minnesota	1–3	San Jose		Backstrom	17,562	18–11–5	41
35	December 14	Minnesota	2–1	Colorado	SO	Harding	16,188	19–11–5	43
36	December 17	Vancouver	2–3	Minnesota	SO	Harding	18,531	20–11–5	45
37	December 19	Minnesota	2–5	Pittsburgh		Backstrom	18,623	20–12–5	45
38	December 22	Minnesota	1–4	NY Rangers		Backstrom	18,006	20–13–5	45
39	December 23	Minnesota	1–4	Philadelphia		Backstrom	19,872	20–14–5	45
40	December 27	Minnesota	4–6	Winnipeg		Backstrom	15,004	20–15–5	45
41	December 29	NY Islanders	5–4	Minnesota		Harding	18,851	20–16–5	45
42	December 31	St. Louis	2–1	Minnesota		Harding	18,919	20–17–5	45

January: 9–4–1 (Home: 5–2–0; Road: 4–2–1)
#	Date	Visitor	Score	Home	OT	Decision	Attendance	Record	Pts	Recap
43	January 2	Buffalo	1–4	Minnesota		Backstrom	18,229	21–17–5	47
44	January 4	Washington	3–5	Minnesota		Backstrom	19,022	22–17–5	49
45	January 7	Minnesota	2–1	Los Angeles	SO	Kuemper	18,118	23–17–5	51
46	January 9	Minnesota	4–1	Phoenix		Backstrom	10,075	24–17–5	53
47	January 11	Colorado	4–2	Minnesota		Backstrom	19,117	24–18–5	53
48	January 12	Minnesota	4–0	Nashville		Kuemper	16,221	25–18–5	55
49	January 14	Ottawa	3–0	Minnesota		Kuemper	18,117	25–19–5	55
50	January 16	Edmonton	1–4	Minnesota		Kuemper	18,037	26–19–5	57
51	January 18	Dallas	2–3	Minnesota	OT	Kuemper	19,192	27–19–5	59
52	January 21	Minnesota	0–4	Dallas		Kuemper	11,191	27–20–5	59
53	January 23	Chicago	1–2	Minnesota		Kuemper	19,226	28–20–5	61
54	January 25	Minnesota	2–3	San Jose	OT	Kuemper	17,562	28–20–6	62
55	January 28	Minnesota	4–2	Anaheim		Kuemper	15,020	29–20–6	64
56	January 30	Minnesota	4–5	Colorado		Backstrom	14,697	29–21–6	64

February: 4–0–1 (Home: 2–0–0; Road: 2–0–1)
#	Date	Visitor	Score	Home	OT	Decision	Attendance	Record	Pts	Recap
57	February 1	Minnesota	3–4	Calgary	OT	Kuemper	19,289	29–21–7	65
58	February 4	Tampa Bay	1–2	Minnesota		Kuemper	18,454	30–21–7	67
59	February 6	Nashville	2–3	Minnesota	OT	Kuemper	18,766	31–21–7	69
60	February 27	Minnesota	3–0	Edmonton		Kuemper	16,839	32–21–7	71
61	February 28	Minnesota	2–1	Vancouver	SO	Kuemper	18,910	33–21–7	73

March: 6–5–4 (Home: 2–2–3; Road: 4–3–1)
#	Date	Visitor	Score	Home	OT	Decision	Attendance	Record	Pts	Recap
62	March 3	Calgary	2–3	Minnesota		Kuemper	18,543	34–21–7	75
63	March 8	Minnesota	3–4	Dallas		Kuemper	19,109	34–22–7	75
64	March 9	St. Louis	3–2	Minnesota	SO	Bryzgalov	18,909	34–22–8	76
65	March 11	Edmonton	4–3	Minnesota	SO	Kuemper	18,650	34–22–9	77
66	March 13	NY Rangers	1–2	Minnesota		Kuemper	18,885	35–22–9	79
67	March 15	Columbus	2–1	Minnesota	SO	Kuemper	19,042	35–22–10	80
68	March 17	Minnesota	1–4	Boston		Kuemper	17,565	35–23–10	80
69	March 18	Minnesota	6–0	NY Islanders		Bryzgalov	14,888	36–23–10	82
70	March 20	Minnesota	3–4	New Jersey	OT	Bryzgalov	14,772	36–23–11	83
71	March 22	Detroit	3–2	Minnesota		Kuemper	19,176	36–24–11	83
72	March 23	Minnesota	4–3	Detroit	OT	Bryzgalov	20,066	37–24–11	85
73	March 26	Vancouver	5–2	Minnesota		Kuemper	19,014	37–25–11	85
74	March 27	Minnesota	1–5	St. Louis		Kuemper	19,646	37–26–11	85
75	March 29	Minnesota	3–1	Phoenix		Bryzgalov	16,691	38–26–11	87
76	March 31	Minnesota	3–2	Los Angeles		Bryzgalov	18,118	39–26–11	89

April: 4–1–1 (Home: 3–1–0; Road: 1–0–1)
#	Date	Visitor	Score	Home	OT	Decision	Attendance	Record	Pts	Recap
77	April 3	Minnesota	2–3	Chicago	SO	Bryzgalov	21,791	39–26–12	90
78	April 5	Pittsburgh	0–4	Minnesota		Bryzgalov	19,409	40–26–12	92
79	April 7	Minnesota	1–0	Winnipeg		Bryzgalov	15,004	41–26–12	94
80	April 8	Boston	3–4	Minnesota	SO	Bryzgalov	18,893	42–26–12	96
81	April 10	St. Louis	2–4	Minnesota		Curry	18,664	43–26–12	98
82	April 13	Nashville	7–3	Minnesota		Bryzgalov	18,658	43–27–12	98

Legend: Win (2 points) Loss (0 points) Overtime/shootout loss (1 point)

== Playoffs ==
The Minnesota Wild entered the playoffs as the Western Conference's first wild card. They defeated the Central Division champion Colorado Avalanche in seven games in the first round, winning all three games at the Xcel Energy Center while losing the first three at the Pepsi Center until winning game seven there on a goal by Nino Niederreiter in overtime. The Wild fell to the Chicago Blackhawks in the second round, losing in game six on an overtime goal by Patrick Kane. It was the Wild's first (and only) loss at home of the 2014 post-season.

2014 Stanley Cup Playoffs

Western Conference first round vs. (C1) Colorado Avalanche: Minnesota won series 4–3
#	Date	Visitor	Score	Home	OT	Decision	Attendance	Series	Recap
1	April 17	Minnesota	4–5	Colorado	OT	Bryzgalov	18,074	0–1	Recap
2	April 19	Minnesota	2–4	Colorado		Bryzgalov	18,402	0–2	Recap
3	April 21	Colorado	0–1	Minnesota	OT	Kuemper	19,221	1–2	Recap
4	April 24	Colorado	1–2	Minnesota		Kuemper	19,396	2–2	Recap
5	April 26	Minnesota	3–4	Colorado	OT	Kuemper	18,418	2–3	Recap
6	April 28	Colorado	2–5	Minnesota		Kuemper	19,314	3–3	Recap
7	April 30	Minnesota	5–4	Colorado	OT	Bryzgalov	18,511	4–3	Recap

Western Conference second round vs. (C3) Chicago Blackhawks: Chicago won series 4–2
#	Date	Visitor	Score	Home	OT	Decision	Attendance	Series	Recap
1	May 2	Minnesota	2–5	Chicago		Bryzgalov	22,116	0–1	Recap
2	May 4	Minnesota	1–4	Chicago		Bryzgalov	22,018	0–2	Recap
3	May 6	Chicago	0–4	Minnesota		Bryzgalov	19,416	1–2	Recap
4	May 9	Chicago	2–4	Minnesota		Bryzgalov	19,405	2–2	Recap
5	May 11	Minnesota	1–2	Chicago		Bryzgalov	22,016	2–3	Recap
6	May 13	Chicago	2–1	Minnesota	OT	Bryzgalov	19,396	2–4	Recap

Legend: Win Loss

== Player statistics ==
Final Stats

Skaters

Regular season
Player	GP	G	A	Pts	+/−	PIM
Jason Pominville	82	30	30	60	3	16
Zach Parise	67	29	27	56	10	30
Mikko Koivu	65	11	43	54	0	24
Ryan Suter	82	8	35	43	15	34
Mikael Granlund	63	8	33	41	−3	22
Nino Niederreiter	81	14	22	36	12	44
Charlie Coyle	70	12	18	30	−7	33
Dany Heatley	76	12	16	28	−18	18
Matt Cooke	82	10	18	28	8	54
Jared Spurgeon	67	5	21	26	15	16
Kyle Brodziak	81	8	16	24	0	61
Justin Fontaine	66	13	8	21	6	26
Jonas Brodin	79	8	11	19	0	22
Marco Scandella	76	3	14	17	10	20
Erik Haula	46	6	9	15	14	29
Matt Moulson^{†}	20	6	7	13	7	8
Keith Ballard	45	2	7	9	−7	37
Torrey Mitchell^{‡}	58	1	8	9	−3	21
Nate Prosser	53	2	6	8	2	58
Jason Zucker	21	4	1	5	2	2
Clayton Stoner	63	1	4	5	−6	84
Stephane Veilleux	34	3	0	3	−2	21
Cody McCormick^{†}	14	1	1	2	2	7
Mathew Dumba	13	1	1	2	−5	2
Zenon Konopka^{‡}	36	1	1	2	−5	55
Michael Rupp	13	0	1	1	1	23
Jonathon Blum	15	0	1	1	−1	0
Christian Folin	1	0	1	1	3	0
Jake Dowell	1	0	0	0	−1	0
Carson McMillan	1	0	0	0	0	0
Brett Bulmer	5	0	0	0	−2	2

Playoffs
Player	GP	G	A	Pts	+/−	PIM
Zach Parise	13	4	10	14	−3	6
Jason Pominville	13	2	7	9	−3	0
Mikael Granlund	13	4	3	7	3	2
Erik Haula	13	4	3	7	2	0
Charlie Coyle	13	3	4	7	−2	6
Ryan Suter	13	1	6	7	−5	4
Mikko Koivu	13	1	6	7	−4	10
Jared Spurgeon	13	3	3	6	0	2
Nino Niederreiter	13	3	3	6	0	8
Kyle Brodziak	12	3	3	6	−2	2
Dany Heatley	11	1	5	6	6	4
Marco Scandella	13	2	1	3	4	0
Matt Moulson	10	1	2	3	0	4
Clayton Stoner	13	1	2	3	2	26
Matt Cooke	6	0	3	3	1	8
Justin Fontaine	9	1	1	2	0	2
Jonas Brodin	13	0	2	2	3	12
Cody McCormick	13	1	0	1	1	14
Stephane Veilleux	4	0	0	0	1	4
Keith Ballard	3	0	0	0	−2	0
Nate Prosser	10	0	0	0	2	12

Goaltenders

Regular season
Player	GP	GS	TOI	W	L	OT	GA	GAA	SA	SV%	SO	G	A	PIM
Josh Harding	29	26	1668	18	7	3	46	1.65	690	.933	3	0	0	0
Darcy Kuemper	26	25	1480	12	8	4	60	2.43	702	.915	2	0	0	0
Niklas Backstrom	21	19	1094	5	11	2	55	3.02	546	.899	0	0	0	0
Ilya Bryzgalov^{†}	12	11	679	7	1	3	24	2.12	269	.911	3	0	0	0
John Curry	2	1	80	1	0	0	4	3.00	57	.930	0	0	0	0

Playoffs
Player	GP	GS	TOI	W	L	GA	GAA	SA	SV%	SO	G	A	PIM
Ilya Bryzgalov	9	8	479	3	6	21	2.63	182	.885	1	0	0	0
Darcy Kuemper	6	5	325	3	1	11	2.03	127	.913	1	0	0	0

^{†}Denotes player spent time with another team before joining the Wild. Stats reflect time with the Wild only.
^{‡}Traded mid-season
Bold/italics denotes franchise record

== Transactions ==
The Wild have been involved in the following transactions during the 2013–14 season.

=== Trades ===
Date	Details
June 30, 2013	To New York Rangers Justin Falk	To Minnesota Wild Benn Ferriero; CBJ's 6th-round pick in 2014
June 30, 2013	To New York Islanders Cal Clutterbuck; NJD's 3rd-round pick in 2013	To Minnesota Wild Nino Niederreiter
July 5, 2013	To Winnipeg Jets Devin Setoguchi	To Minnesota Wild 2nd-round pick in 2014
February 5, 2014	To San Jose Sharks Chad Rau	To Minnesota Wild Curt Gogol
February 26, 2014	To Chicago Blackhawks Brian Connelly	To Minnesota Wild Brad Winchester
March 4, 2014	To Edmonton Oilers BUF's 4th-round pick in 2014	To Minnesota Wild Ilya Bryzgalov
March 5, 2014	To Buffalo Sabres Torrey Mitchell; WPG's 2nd-round pick in 2014; 2nd-round pick in 2016	To Minnesota Wild Matt Moulson; Cody McCormick

=== Free agents signed ===
Player	Former team	Contract terms
Keith Ballard	Vancouver Canucks	2 years, $3 million
Matt Cooke	Pittsburgh Penguins	3 years, $7.5 million
Jonathon Blum	Nashville Predators	1 year, $650,000
Jon Landry	Bridgeport Sound Tigers	1 year, $625,000
John Curry	Iowa Wild	1 year, $550,000
Brady Brassart	Calgary Hitmen	3 years, $2.51 million entry-level contract
Zack Mitchell	Guelph Storm	3 years, $1.845 million entry-level contract
Christian Folin	UMass Lowell	2 years, $1.85 million entry-level contract
Michael Keranen	Ilves	1 year, $925,000 entry-level contract

=== Free agents lost ===
Player	New team	Contract terms
Matt Cullen	Nashville Predators	2 years, $7 million
Pierre-Marc Bouchard	New York Islanders	1 year, $2 million
Benn Ferriero	Vancouver Canucks	1 year, $550,000
Tom Gilbert	Florida Panthers	1 year, $900,000

=== Claimed via waivers ===
Player	Former team	Date claimed off waivers

=== Lost via waivers ===
Player	New team	Date claimed off waivers
Zenon Konopka	Buffalo Sabres	January 3, 2014

=== Player signings ===
Player	Date	Contract terms
Jared Spurgeon	July 5, 2013	3 years, $8 million
Tyler Cuma	July 30, 2013	1 year, $575,000
Jason Pominville	October 3, 2013	5 years, $28 million contract extension
Kurtis Gabriel	October 3, 2013	3 years, $2 million entry-level contract
Gustav Olofsson	March 24, 2013	3 years, $2.385 million entry-level contract

== Draft picks ==
Minnesota Wild's picks at the 2013 NHL entry draft, to be held in Newark, New Jersey on June 30, 2013.

Round	#	Player	Pos	Nationality	College/Junior/Club team (League)
2	46	Gustav Olofsson	D	Sweden	Green Bay Gamblers (USHL)
3	81^{[b]}	Kurtis Gabriel	RW	Canada	Owen Sound Attack (OHL)
4	107	Dylan Labbe	D	Canada	Shawinigan Cataractes (QMJHL)
5	137	Carson Soucy	D	Canada	Spruce Grove Saints (AJHL)
6	167	Avery Peterson	C	United States	Grand Rapids Thunderhawks (MSHSL)
7	197	Nolan De Jong	D	Canada	Victoria Grizzlies (BCHL)
7	200^{[c]}	Alexandre Belanger	G	Canada	Rouyn-Noranda Huskies (QMJHL)

Draft notes

- The Minnesota Wild's first-round pick went to the Buffalo Sabres as the result of an April 3, 2013 trade that sent Jason Pominville and a 2014 fourth-round pick to the Wild in exchange for Johan Larsson, Matt Hackett, a 2014 second-round pick and this pick.
- The New Jersey Devils' third-round pick went to the New York Islanders as the result of a trade on June 30, 2013, that sent Nino Niederreiter to Minnesota in exchange for Cal Clutterbuck and this pick.
  Minnesota previously acquired this pick as the result of a trade on February 24, 2012, that sent Marek Zidlicky to New Jersey in exchange for Kurtis Foster, Nick Palmieri, Stephane Veilleux, Washington's second-round pick in 2012 and this pick (being conditional at the time of the trade). The conditions – New Jersey make the Eastern Conference finals of the 2012 Stanley Cup playoffs, Zidlicky plays in 75 percent of New Jersey's games in the first two rounds – were converted on May 9. 2012.
- The Minnesota Wild's third-round pick went to the Pittsburgh Penguins (via Philadelphia and Dallas), the Wild traded this pick to the Philadelphia Flyers as the result of a June 27, 2011 trade that sent Darroll Powe to the Wild in exchange for this pick.
- ^{b} The San Jose Sharks' third-round pick went to the Minnesota Wild as a result of an August 7, 2011 trade that sent James Sheppard to the Sharks in exchange for this pick.
- ^{c} The New York Rangers' seventh-round pick went to the Minnesota Wild as a result of a February 3, 2012 trade that sent Casey Wellman to the Rangers in exchange for Erik Christensen and this pick.
