= 2013–14 St. Louis Blues season =

National Hockey League team season

2013–14 St. Louis Blues
- Division: 2nd Central
- Conference: 3rd Western
- 2013–14 record: 52–23–7
- Home record: 28–9–4
- Road record: 24–14–3
- Goals for: 248
- Goals against: 191

Team information
- General manager: Doug Armstrong
- Coach: Ken Hitchcock
- Captain: David Backes
- Alternate captains: Barret Jackman; T. J. Oshie; Alex Pietrangelo; Alexander Steen
- Arena: Scottrade Center
- Average attendance: 17,025 (88.9%); 41 games
- Minor league affiliates: Chicago Wolves (AHL); Kalamazoo Wings (ECHL); St. Charles Chill (CHL)

Team leaders
- Goals: Alexander Steen (33)
- Assists: Alex Pietrangelo (43)
- Points: Alexander Steen (62)
- Penalty minutes: Ryan Reaves (126)
- Plus/minus: Jaden Schwartz (+28)
- Wins: Jaroslav Halak (24)
- Goals against average: Brian Elliott (1.96)

The 2013–14 St. Louis Blues season was the 47th season for the National Hockey League (NHL) franchise that was established on June 5, 1967. They were eliminated in the first round of the 2014 Stanley Cup playoffs by the Chicago Blackhawks, four games to two.

== Regular season ==
=== October ===
Jaroslav Halak became the Blues' leader in shutouts with his 17th on October 5, with a 7–0 victory over the Florida Panthers at the Scottrade Center, surpassing Glenn Hall's 16. Hall's record took 140 games (1968–1971), while Halak's took him only 121 games since he joined the Blues in June 2010.

The Blues have opened the season with a 4–0 start on October 12 with a home win against the New York Rangers, the first time they have started that perfectly in their 47-year history. The game was also their 10th consecutive home win dating back to last season.

=== November ===
Alexander Steen was named the First Star of the Month for October on November 1, having the best start of his NHL career. He scored 11 goals, including four power-play goals, and sat fourth in the NHL with 16 points in the team's 10 games played for the month.

The Blues' telecasts earned the highest ratings in October in the team's 18 seasons on Fox Sports Midwest, with a 3.5 rating, 94% higher than in October 2011 (1.8), and 13% higher than the team's previous October best, a 3.1 in 1997. The Blues were 7–1–1 in October.

Steen scored his NHL-leading 14th goal on November 7 against the Calgary Flames, the game-winner. Alexander Ovechkin and Steven Stamkos had tied him with their 13th earlier in the evening. He was the first Blues' player to score 14 goals in the team's first 14 games since the 1991 season, when Brett Hull scored 16. Maxim Lapierre scored his first goal as a Blue and goaltender Brian Elliott earned his 100th career win in stopping 18 shots out of 20. Jordan Leopold got his first two points of the season (both assists), while Kevin Shattenkirk got an assist on the Blues' second goal, giving him at least one in his seventh consecutive game, the longest in the NHL this season. He has eight in that span.

On November 16, Steen scored his NHL-leading 17th goal, the game-winner with 6:20 into the third period, and earlier added an assist to pass Sidney Crosby for the points lead at 26, in a 4–2 win over the Carolina Hurricanes. Steen also extended his NHL-best points streak to 13 games, totaling 13 goals and five assists in that stretch. Blues' Head Coach Ken Hitchcock also won his 618th game, passing Jacques Lemaire for ninth place on the all-time list. Steen's consecutive game streak of at least one point ended at 13, in the next game on Nov. 17.

On November 23, Coach Hitchcock got his 621st win, passing Bryan Murray for eighth place on the all-time list.

On November 25, Jaroslav Halak got his 27th career shutout, a franchise-record 18th as a member of the Blues and his second this season.

On November 27, Steen scored his 20th goal, tying Alexander Ovechkin for the NHL lead, in the Blues' fifth consecutive win. The Blues were 10–1–1 in their past 12 games for a 19–3–3 record and 41 points.

=== December ===
Alexander Steen scored his 23rd and 24th goals in a 5–1 win on December 19, after earlier in the day signing a 3-year, $17.4 million contract extension to keep him as a Blue through to the 2016–17 season. His 24 goals, tying his career-high after only 34 team games (23–7–4), were second in the NHL only to the 28 scored by Alexander Ovechkin. Brenden Morrow earned his 300th career assist. The team was 48–0–1 in the previous 49 home games when scoring three goals or more. Steen, the second-highest goal scorer in the NHL with 24, was sidelined with an upper-body injury during the second period of the December 21 game against the Edmonton Oilers. He was placed on injured reserve with a concussion on December 28. He had last played on December 21, leaving in the second period. He led the Blues with 24 goals (second in the NHL) and 38 points.

Chris Stewart was named First Star of the Week on December 23, for his performance in the week ending December 22, after earning six goals and one assist. He beat Sidney Crosby (Pittsburgh) and Matt Duchene (Colorado).

On December 23, the prime minister of Canada, Stephen Harper, attended the Blues' game in Calgary against the Flames.

On December 28, the Blues beat the Chicago Blackhawks in a thrilling 6–5 shootout at Scottrade to gain a point on the Blackhawks, and now within six points of division-leading Chicago, but with four games fewer played. The Blues were twice down by two goals, but came back to tie in regulation and then through a scoreless overtime. The Blues have beaten Chicago all three games played with two coming in shootouts, with this game playing without their top scorer, Alexander Steen. Dmitrij Jaskin scored his first NHL goal.

=== January ===
Three Blues' players were named to the 2014 Winter Olympics, men's USA Olympic team in Sochi, (February 7–23). David Backes, 29, T. J. Oshie, 27, and Kevin Shattenkirk (to be 25 then), were named to the team after the 2014 Winter Classic game on January 1. Backes (Minneapolis, Minnesota) was named to the USA Olympic team for the second time, Oshie (Everett, Washington), and Shattenkirk (New Rochelle, New York) for the first.

Vladimir Sobotka was named to the Czech Republic's men's Olympic team, but a leg injury on January 31 prevented him from participating in the Olympics.

The Blues had their best start in the first half of the season (41 games) in team history after the January 4 game, with a 29–7–5 record and 63 points.

Goalie Brian Elliott was named the NHL's Second Star of the Week on January 6 for the week ending Jan. 5, after posting a glittering 3–0–0 record with a 1.00 GAA and a 0.962 save percentage, including one shutout, the 24th of his career and 15th with the Blues. That was one shy of Glenn Hall for #2 in team history. He came within eight seconds of a second shutout against the Minnesota Wild on New Year's Eve.

Jay Bouwmeester, 30, and Alex Pietrangelo (to be 24 then), both defensemen, represented Canada on the men's Olympic team.

Vladimir Tarasenko represented Russia on the men's Olympic team. He was a native of Yaroslavl.

Jaroslav Halak represented Slovakia on the men's Olympic team.

The Blues were back on top of the TSN Power Rankings on January 13, and had a +1.34 per game goal differential.

Alexander Steen returned to a full practice with the Blues on January 13, still out with a concussion. He led the Blues in goals (24) and scoring (38 points) as of his December 21 injury. His 38 points were fifth in the NHL. This was his concussion, after losing 39 games during the 2011–12 season. The Blues were able to play at a 7–1–1 pace in his nine missed games, through January 10. His 38 points led the Blues until T. J. Oshie scored twice in the January 14 game, giving Oshie 39 points with a team-leading 29 assists to go with 10 goals, but playing in 45 games to Steen's 35 games. He was activated on January 17, after missing 11 games since his concussion on December 21. He was fifth-ranked in goals with 24. Named to Sweden's men's Olympic team, as was teammate Patrik Berglund. They were selected on January 7. Steen, 29, representing Sweden for the fourth time overall, first time at the Olympics. Berglund, 25, for the fifth time overall, first time at the Olympics. Altogether, 10 Blues' players have been selected to five countries' Olympic teams.

=== February ===
On February 6, coach Ken Hitchcock won his 110th game with the Blues, tying him for fourth place with Scotty Bowman on the Blues' list. With the OT win, the Blues moved within two points of Chicago for first place in the Central Division, and three points of the NHL-leading Anaheim Ducks.

On February 15, at the 2014 Winter Olympics in Sochi, T. J. Oshie scored four shootout goals in six attempts (in a preliminary round only for seeding purposes), including the game-winner in a thrilling 3–2 win for the U.S. over Russia in front of a crowd of 11,678 at the Bolshoy Ice Dome. Video. Oshie was a player on the "bubble" whether the U.S. team would add him to its roster or not, but took him because of his success rate in shootouts. At the time of the Olympic break after the February 8 game, Oshie was tied for the team lead in points (46, 14 goals and 32 assists in 57G) with team goal-scoring leader Alexander Steen (28 goals and 18 assists in 46G).

On February 28, the Blues traded Jaroslav Halak and Chris Stewart, along with minor leaguer William Carrier and a first-round pick in 2015 and third-round pick in 2016, in exchange for goaltender Ryan Miller and forward Steve Ott of the Buffalo Sabres. Miller and Ott joined the Blues on Sunday for their road game against the Phoenix Coyotes.

=== March ===
The Blues took over the top spot in the NHL after their March 9 win with 94 points, and became the first team to pass the 100-point level (47–14–7), for the sixth time in their history after beating the Winnipeg Jets on March 17. On March 16, the team lost forward Vladimir Tarasenko because of a hand injury from the previous game on March 15. T. J. Oshie missed his first game of the year, the wild St. Patrick's Day game with numerous fights, to see the birth of his daughter earlier in the day. The Blues are four points ahead of their closest competitors, the Boston Bruins, Anaheim Ducks, and San Jose Sharks for the Presidents' Trophy with 14 games to play.

On March 22, the Blues clinched a playoff spot for the third consecutive season and 38th in franchise history, after the Phoenix Coyotes lost after the Blues lost to the Philadelphia Flyers. The Blues lead the Western Conference with 101 points (47–16–7) with 12 games remaining.

With his 16th career shutout for the Blues and 25th career shutout on March 24, Brian Elliott tied Glenn Hall for second place. He accomplished his 25th shutout in only his 209th start. It was the fifth fastest to 25 shutouts in modern NHL history. After 28 games, Elliott has a 17–5–2 record, 1.97 GAA, a .921 save percentage and fourth shutout this year. Jaroslav Halak holds the Blues' record with 20 shutouts.

T. J. Oshie was named the NHL's Third Star of the Week on March 31, for the week ending March 30. He tied for second place with six points in three games, including his first career hat trick on March 27.

=== April ===
The Blues set a new team wins record with their 52nd on April 3, breaking the record held by the 1999–2000 Blues team that had 51 wins, 114 points, and won the Presidents' Trophy that season. They were in a strong position for the trophy with 111 points (52–17–7), over Boston by losing one less game then the Bruins, with six games remaining.

On April 4, Alexander Steen was nominated by the St. Louis chapter of the Professional Hockey Writers' Association for the Bill Masterton Memorial Trophy. The trophy is awarded annually to the player "who best exemplifies the qualities of perseverance, sportsmanship and dedication to hockey." Steen led the Blues with 33 goals, and was tied for the team lead with 60 points despite losing 11 games from a concussion in December.

The Blues Central Division lead evaporated after their fourth consecutive loss on April 10, while the Colorado Avalanche won, tying the Blues with 111 points, but having the season's head-to-head advantage over the Blues.

T. J. Oshie was hit high by the Wild's Michael Rupp on April 10, in the middle of the second period. Rupp was immediately given a 10-minute match penalty, and subsequently a four-game suspension without pay, from the NHL Department of Player Safety for the illegal hit to the head. The suspension covers the last regular season game and three playoff games. Rupp forfeited $7,692 for those four games. Oshie had 21 goals, and was second on the team with 60 points.

Just before the regular season came to an end, the Blues were battling several key injuries which contributed to their season-high five-game losing streak headed into the final game on April 13. T. J. Oshie, David Backes, Vladimir Sobotka, Derek Roy, Brenden Morrow and long-injured Vladimir Tarasenko were available for the final game. Patrik Berglund got hurt in the final period of the April 12 game. The playoffs started on April 17.

Of the eight players sidelined by injury who couldn't play in the last regular season game on April 13, six returned for the first game of the first playoff round, against Chicago on April 17. One of the six was Vladimir Tarasenko, who suffered a broken hand on March 15 with surgery on March 19, and was not expected to be evaluated until after the end of the first round. Only T. J. Oshie and Patrik Berglund won't be ready.

Fox Sports Midwest had a record broadcast season covering the team. The Blues were seen in 4% of homes in the St. Louis area market who had a television. The previous record was last year (2012–13 season) with a 3.9 rating. The Blues' rating ranked fifth among U.S.-based NHL teams.

=== May ===
Coach Ken Hitchcock, 62, was extended through the 2014–15 St. Louis Blues season on May 7, as were associate coach Brad Shaw and assistant coach Ray Bennett. The club announced that assistant coach Gary Agnew, and goaltending coach Corey Hirsch were not retained. Hitchcock was the 24th head coach of the Blues, starting on November 7, 2011. He had a 124-55-20 (.673) record in his three years, a record for a Blues' coach. He was an Edmonton, Alberta native, who has a 657-405-78 (.602) lifetime NHL coaching mark. On May 13, 2014, the Blues announced they had hired former Carolina Hurricanes head coach, Kirk Muller as an assistant coach to Hitchcock.

== Standings ==
Central Division
Pos	Team	GP	W	L	OTL	ROW	GF	GA	GD	Pts
1	y – Colorado Avalanche	82	52	22	8	47	250	220	+30	112
2	x – St. Louis Blues	82	52	23	7	43	248	191	+57	111
3	x – Chicago Blackhawks	82	46	21	15	40	267	220	+47	107
4	Minnesota Wild	82	43	27	12	35	207	206	+1	98
5	Dallas Stars	82	40	31	11	36	235	228	+7	91
6	Nashville Predators	82	38	32	12	36	216	242	−26	88
7	Winnipeg Jets	82	37	35	10	29	227	237	−10	84

Source: National Hockey League
x – Clinched playoff spot; y – Clinched division

== Schedule and results ==
=== Pre-season ===
Legend: Win Loss Overtime/shootout loss

2013 preseason game log: 3–2–1 (Home: 2–1–0; Road: 1–1–1)
#	Date	Visitor	Score	Home	OT	Decision	Attendance	Record	Recap
1	September 15	St. Louis	6–5	Dallas	SO	Allen	7,056	1–0–0	Recap
2^{[a]}	September 18	St. Louis	3–4	Tampa Bay	SO	Elliott	6,162	1–0–1	Recap
3	September 20	Tampa Bay	4–3	St. Louis		Halak	13,246	1–1–1	Recap
4	September 21	Dallas	2–3	St. Louis	OT	Allen	13,028	2–1–1	Recap
5	September 25	St. Louis	1–3	Minnesota		Elliott	15,183	2–2–1	Recap
6	September 27	Minnesota	1–4	St. Louis		Halak	13,233	3–2–1	Recap
Notes:^{a} Game was played at Amway Center in Orlando, Florida.

=== Regular season ===
Legend: Win Loss Overtime/shootout loss

2013–14 Game Log

October: 7–1–2 (Home: 5–1–1; Road: 2–0–1)
#	Date	Visitor	Score	Home	OT	Decision	Attendance	Record	Pts	Recap
1	October 3	Nashville	2–4	St. Louis		Halak	18,851	1–0–0	2	Recap
2	October 5	Florida	0–7	St. Louis		Halak	16,264	2–0–0	4	Recap
3	October 9	Chicago	2–3	St. Louis		Halak	16,565	3–0–0	6	Recap
4	October 12	NY Rangers	3–5	St. Louis		Halak	18,130	4–0–0	8	Recap
5	October 15	San Jose	6–2	St. Louis		Halak	14,503	4–1–0	8	Recap
6	October 17	St. Louis	3–2	Chicago	SO	Halak	21,169	5–1–0	10	Recap
7	October 18	St. Louis	3–4	Winnipeg	SO	Elliott	15,004	5–1–1	11	Recap
8	October 25	Vancouver	3–2	St. Louis	OT	Halak	17,604	5–1–2	12	Recap
9	October 26	St. Louis	6–1	Nashville		Halak	16,681	6–1–2	14	Recap
10	October 29	Winnipeg	2–3	St. Louis		Halak	15,287	7–1–2	16	Recap

November: 11–3–1 (Home: 6–0–1; Road: 5–3–0)
#	Date	Visitor	Score	Home	OT	Decision	Attendance	Record	Pts	Recap
11	November 1	St. Louis	4–0	Florida		Elliott	12,922	8–1–2	18	Recap
12	November 2	St. Louis	2–4	Tampa Bay		Halak	18,885	8–2–2	18	Recap
13	November 5	St. Louis	3–2	Montreal	SO	Halak	21,273	9–2–2	20	Recap
14	November 7	Calgary	2–3	St. Louis		Elliott	14,877	10–2–2	22	Recap
15	November 9	Pittsburgh	1–2	St. Louis		Halak	18,685	11–2–2	24	Recap
16	November 12	Phoenix	3–2	St. Louis	OT	Halak	15,678	11–2–3	25	Recap
17	November 14	Colorado	3–7	St. Louis		Halak	14,190	12–2–3	27	Recap
18	November 16	Carolina	2–4	St. Louis		Elliott	17,936	13–2–3	29	Recap
19	November 17	St. Louis	1–4	Washington		Halak	18,506	13–3–3	29	Recap
20	November 19	St. Louis	4–1	Buffalo		Halak	17,710	14–3–3	31	Recap
21	November 21	St. Louis	3–2	Boston	SO	Halak	17,565	15–3–3	33	Recap
22	November 23	Dallas	1–6	St. Louis		Elliott	18,037	16–3–3	35	Recap
23	November 25	Minnesota	0–3	St. Louis		Halak	15,832	17–3–3	37	Recap
24	November 27	St. Louis	4–1	Colorado		Halak	17,595	18–3–3	39	Recap
25	November 29	St. Louis	3–6	San Jose		Elliott	17,562	18–4–3	39	Recap

December: 9–3–2 (Home: 4–2–0; Road: 5–1–2)
#	Date	Visitor	Score	Home	OT	Decision	Attendance	Record	Pts	Recap
26	December 2	St. Louis	2–3	Los Angeles		Halak	18,118	18–5–3	39	Recap
27	December 5	NY Islanders	1–5	St. Louis		Halak	14,152	19–5–3	41	Recap
28	December 7	Anaheim	5–2	St. Louis		Halak	17,646	19–6–3	41	Recap
29	December 10	St. Louis	2–1	Winnipeg		Elliott	15,004	20–6–3	43	Recap
30	December 12	Toronto	3–6	St. Louis		Elliott	16,073	21–6–3	45	Recap
31	December 14	St. Louis	4–3	Columbus	OT	Halak	13,801	22–6–3	47	Recap
32	December 16	St. Louis	2–3	Ottawa	OT	Elliott	16,008	22–6–4	48	Recap
33	December 17	San Jose	4–2	St. Louis		Halak	16,323	22–7–4	48	Recap
34	December 19	Montreal	1–5	St. Louis		Halak	17,189	23–7–4	50	Recap
35	December 21	St. Louis	6–0	Edmonton		Elliott	16,839	24–7–4	52	Recap
36	December 23	St. Louis	3–4	Calgary	SO	Halak	19,289	24–7–5	53	Recap
37	December 28	Chicago	5–6	St. Louis	SO	Elliott	20,082	25–7–5	55	Recap
38	December 29	St. Louis	3–2	Dallas	OT	Elliott	15,678	26–7–5	57	Recap
39	December 31	St. Louis	2–1	Minnesota		Elliott	18,919	27–7–5	59	Recap

January: 9–5–0 (Home: 4–2–0; Road: 5–3–0)
#	Date	Visitor	Score	Home	OT	Decision	Attendance	Record	Pts	Recap
40	January 2	Los Angeles	0–5	St. Louis		Elliott	19,839	28–7–5	61	Recap
41	January 4	Columbus	2–6	St. Louis		Elliott	19,611	29–7–5	63	Recap
42	January 7	St. Louis	5–2	Edmonton		Elliott	16,839	30–7–5	65	Recap
43	January 9	St. Louis	5–0	Calgary		Halak	19,289	31–7–5	67	Recap
44	January 10	St. Louis	1–2	Vancouver		Elliott	18,910	31–8–5	67	Recap
45	January 14	Phoenix	1–2	St. Louis		Halak	16,571	32–8–5	69	Recap
46	January 16	Los Angeles	4–1	St. Louis		Halak	19,374	32–9–5	69	Recap
47	January 18	Anaheim	3–2	St. Louis		Elliott	19,910	32–10–5	69	Recap
48	January 20	St. Louis	4–1	Detroit		Halak	20,066	33–10–5	71	Recap
49	January 21	St. Louis	1–7	New Jersey		Elliott	11,432	33–11–5	71	Recap
50	January 23	St. Louis	2–1	NY Rangers		Halak	18,006	34–11–5	73	Recap
51	January 25	St. Louis	4–3	NY Islanders	SO	Halak	15,888	35–11–5	75	Recap
52	January 28	New Jersey	0–3	St. Louis		Halak	16,099	36–11–5	77	Recap
53	January 31	St. Louis	1–3	Carolina		Halak	16,035	36–12–5	77	Recap

February: 3–2–1 (Home: 3–0–1; Road: 0–2–0)
#	Date	Visitor	Score	Home	OT	Decision	Attendance	Record	Pts	Recap
54	February 1	Nashville	3–4	St. Louis	SO	Elliott	19,358	37–12–5	79	Recap
55	February 4	Ottawa	5–4	St. Louis	SO	Halak	14,758	37–12–6	80	Recap
56	February 6	Boston	2–3	St. Louis	OT	Halak	19,671	38–12–6	82	Recap
57	February 8	Winnipeg	3–4	St. Louis	SO	Elliott	19,052	39–12–6	84	Recap
58	February 26	St. Louis	0–1	Vancouver		Halak	18,910	39–13–6	84	Recap
59	February 28	St. Louis	0–1	Anaheim		Elliott	17,369	39–14–6	84	Recap

March: 11–3–1 (Home: 4–1–1; Road: 7–2–0)
#	Date	Visitor	Score	Home	OT	Decision	Attendance	Record	Pts	Recap
60	March 2	St. Louis	4–2	Phoenix		Miller	13,955	40–14–6	86	Recap
61	March 4	Tampa Bay	2–4	St. Louis		Miller	18,602	41–14–6	88	Recap
62	March 6	St. Louis	2–1	Nashville		Miller	16,180	42–14–6	90	Recap
63	March 8	St. Louis	2–1	Colorado		Miller	18,137	43–14–6	92	Recap
64	March 9	St. Louis	3–2	Minnesota	SO	Elliott	18,909	44–14–6	94	Recap
65	March 11	Dallas	3–2	St. Louis	OT	Miller	16,763	44–14–7	95	Recap
66	March 13	Edmonton	2–6	St. Louis		Miller	18,084	45–14–7	97	Recap
67	March 15	St. Louis	4–1	Nashville		Miller	17,113	46–14–7	99	Recap
68	March 17	Winnipeg	1–3	St. Louis		Miller	16,665	47–14–7	101	Recap
69	March 19	St. Louis	0–4	Chicago		Miller	21,640	47–15–7	101	Recap
70	March 22	St. Louis	1–4	Philadelphia		Miller	19,942	47–16–7	101	Recap
71	March 23	St. Louis	1–0	Pittsburgh		Elliott	18,662	48–16–7	103	Recap
72	March 25	St. Louis	5–3	Toronto		Miller	19,505	49–16–7	105	Recap
73	March 27	Minnesota	1–5	St. Louis		Miller	19,646	50–16–7	107	Recap
74	March 29	Dallas	4–2	St. Louis		Miller	19,703	50–17–7	107	Recap

April: 2–6–0 (Home: 2–3–0; Road: 0–3–0)
#	Date	Visitor	Score	Home	OT	Decision	Attendance	Record	Pts	Recap
75	April 1	Philadelphia	0–1	St. Louis	SO	Miller	18,647	51–17–7	109	Recap
76	April 3	Buffalo	1–2	St. Louis		Elliott	16,146	52–17–7	111	Recap
77	April 5	Colorado	4–0	St. Louis		Miller	19,153	52–18–7	111	Recap
78	April 6	St. Louis	2–4	Chicago		Elliott	22,184	52–19–7	111	Recap
79	April 8	Washington	4–1	St. Louis		Miller	17,447	52–20–7	111	Recap
80	April 10	St. Louis	2–4	Minnesota		Miller	18,664	52–21–7	111	Recap
81	April 11	St. Louis	0–3	Dallas		Miller	18,532	52–22–7	111	Recap
82	April 13	Detroit	3–0	St. Louis		Miller	18,430	52–23–7	111	Recap

Legend: Win (2 points) Loss (0 points) Overtime/shootout loss (1 point)

== Playoffs ==
The St. Louis Blues entered the playoffs as the Central Division's second seed. They faced the Chicago Blackhawks in the first round.
(Round 1 Schedule, Schedule, incl. networks/tickets)

The longest game in franchise history ended at 0:26 into the third overtime of Game 1 on April 17, with Alexander Steen scoring the game-winning goal to win, 4–3, ending the 100 min. 26 sec. marathon. Jaden Schwartz scored with 1:45 remaining in the third period to tie it at 3–3. A highlight was forward Maxim Lapierre after inadvertently getting shoved into the goal crease, and then making a save on a shot that sailed past Ryan Miller in the first overtime. The team ended its scoring drought after 148 minutes 39 seconds with Adam Cracknell's first-ever playoff goal at 4:40 into the first period. Jaden Schwartz and Vladimir Tarasenko also scored their first playoff goals. The home record for a playoff overtime game for the Blues had been 33:49 of extra time in a 5–4 win over Chicago on April 20, 1989. Jay Bouwmeester exited the game in the first overtime with dehydration symptoms, though he extended his consecutive games streak at 717, which at the time was the longest active stretch in major American professional sports. The Blues had 52 shots on goal to Chicago's 42. The previous longest game in franchise history was April 7, 1984, with the Blues winning 4–3 over Detroit at 17:07 into the second overtime.

Patrik Berglund returned for Game 3 (April 21) after suffering an upper-body injury on April 11 against Dallas. David Backes exited Game 2 on April 19 and was unable to return after an illegal hit to the head by Brent Seabrook at the 15:09 mark in the third period. Seabrook was given a 5-minute charging major and a Game Misconduct, and was subsequently suspended for three games by the NHL's Department of Player Safety. A teammate of Seabrook's was caught on camera taunting the injured Backes with a "Wakey, wakey, Backes" chant. While Duncan Keith claimed to not "remember everything" he said, several Blues players attributed the taunt to him in postgame interviews. The Blues led the series 2–0 after the April 19 game win, 4–3, with the game-winning goal scored 5:50 into the first overtime by Barret Jackman.

Game 3 on April 21 garnered the highest ratings ever for Fox Sports Midwest in broadcasting a Blues' game with an 11.9 household rating in the St. Louis market. The previous high was 11.0 on April 16, 2012, in the Blues' first-round win at San Jose. The Blues-Blackhawks game was the most-watched program that evening in St. Louis. Viewership peaked at the end of the game at a 14.7 rating/22 share/184,000 households. Game 1 on April 17 was the third-watched all-time with a 10.4 rating. The afternoon Game 2 on April 19 (KSDK) received an 11.2 rating.

Brenden Morrow missed Game 4, and was out for the remainder of the first round series. Game 5 on April 25 was broadcast on NBC Sports instead of Fox Sports Midwest. Game 6 on Sunday, April 27, was broadcast on NBC, at 2pm.

Vladimir Tarasenko, after four games (April 23) led the NHL with four playoff goals. Kevin Shattenkirk had one goal and four assists for five points, tied for second among defensemen.

The Blues got captain David Backes back for Game 5 at home (April 25), playing in 21:35 on 34 shifts, and the team outhitting Chicago 54–17, but it was for naught as the team lost 3–2 in the fourth overtime game, with them missing the net numerous times in shots, and too frequently an open net. Through the first five games, the Blues missed the net on 88 of their shot attempts, and had another 68 shots blocked by Chicago defenders. Coach Ken Hitchcock changed lines on both offense and defense with Alexander Steen joining Vladimir Sobotka and Vladimir Tarasenko on a second line.

Legend: Win Loss

2014 Stanley Cup playoffs

Western Conference First Round vs. (C3) Chicago Blackhawks: Chicago won series 4–2
#	Date	Visitor	Score	Home	OT	Decision	Attendance	Series	Recap
1	April 17	Chicago	3–4	St. Louis	3OT	Miller	19,423	1–0	Recap
2	April 19	Chicago	3–4	St. Louis	OT	Miller	19,639	2–0	Recap
3	April 21	St. Louis	0–2	Chicago		Miller	22,112	2–1	Recap
4	April 23	St. Louis	3–4	Chicago	OT	Miller	22,123	2–2	Recap
5	April 25	Chicago	3–2	St. Louis	OT	Miller	19,796	2–3	Recap
6	April 27	St. Louis	1–5	Chicago		Miller	22,144	2–4	Recap

Legend: Win Loss

== Player statistics ==
=== Skaters ===
Final stats

Regular season
Player	GP	G	A	Pts	+/−	PIM
Alexander Steen	68	**33**	29	**62**	17	46
T. J. Oshie	79	21	39	60	19	42
David Backes	74	27	30	57	14	119
Jaden Schwartz	80	25	31	56	**28**	27
Alex Pietrangelo	81	8	**43**	51	20	32
Kevin Shattenkirk	81	10	35	45	1	38
Vladimir Tarasenko + (3/16-4/13)	64	21	22	43	20	16
Derek Roy	75	9	28	37	−1	30
Jay Bouwmeester	**82**	4	33	37	26	20
Vladimir Sobotka	61	9	24	33	14	72
Patrik Berglund	78	14	18	32	10	38
Chris Stewart ^{‡} (traded on 2/28)	57	15	11	26	2	112
Brenden Morrow	71	13	12	25	1	76
Maxim Lapierre	71	9	6	15	−3	78
Barret Jackman	79	3	12	15	11	97
Roman Polak	72	4	9	13	3	71
Magnus Paajarvi	55	6	6	12	−6	6
Ian Cole	46	3	8	11	15	31
Ryan Reaves	63	2	6	8	−1	**126**
Jordan Leopold	27	1	5	6	1	6
Carlo Colaiacovo	25	1	3	4	−4	18
Steve Ott ^{†} (acquired after 2/28)	23	0	3	3	−12	37
Dmitrij Jaskin	18	1	1	2	−3	8
Adam Cracknell	19	0	2	2	0	0
Chris Porter	22	0	1	1	−3	0
Keith Aucoin	2	0	0	0	−3	0
Ty Rattie *	2	0	0	0	−2	0

^{+} indicates on Injured Reserve.
* indicates not currently on the active roster.
^{‡}Traded away mid-season, date in ( ). Stats reflect time with Blues only.
^{†}Denotes player spent time with another team before joining Blues, acquired date in ( ). Stats reflect time with Blues only.
**Bold** = leading team in category.

Playoffs
Player	GP	G	A	Pts	+/−	PIM
Kevin Shattenkirk	6	1	4	5	−1	2
Vladimir Tarasenko	6	4	0	4	1	0
Barret Jackman	6	1	2	3	−5	6
Alexander Steen	6	1	2	3	−2	6
Chris Porter	6	1	2	3	2	0
Alex Pietrangelo	6	1	2	3	1	0
Jaden Schwartz	6	1	2	3	−4	0
Vladimir Sobotka	6	0	3	3	2	4
T. J. Oshie	5	2	0	2	−3	2
Maxim Lapierre	6	1	1	2	3	4
Steve Ott	6	0	2	2	−3	14
Adam Cracknell	5	1	0	1	0	2
Jordan Leopold	6	0	1	1	−1	2
Derek Roy	4	0	1	1	−2	0
Jay Bouwmeester	6	0	1	1	−1	2
David Backes	4	0	1	1	−3	2
Roman Polak	6	0	1	1	−3	4
Brenden Morrow	2	0	0	0	0	0
Ryan Reaves	6	0	0	0	−1	6
Patrik Berglund	4	0	0	0	−7	0

=== Goaltenders ===
(through final regular season game on April 13, 2014)

Regular season
Player	GP	GS	TOI	W	L	OT	GA	GAA	SA	SV%	SO	G	A	PIM
Brian Elliott	31	25	1,624	18	6	2	53	1.96	681	.922	4	0	2	0
Ryan Miller ^{†} (acquired after 2/28)	19	19	1,117	10	8	1	46	2.47	474	.903	1	0	0	0
Jaroslav Halak ^{‡} (traded on 2/28)	40	38	2,238	24	9	4	83	2.23	1,002	.917	4	0	1	0
Totals		82	4,979	52	23	7	182	2.19	2,157	.916	9	0	3	0

Playoffs (through final game on April 27, 2014)

Playoffs
Player	GP	GS	TOI	W	L	GA	GAA	SA	SV%	SO	G	A	PIM
Ryan Miller	6	6	422	2	4	19	2.70	185	.897	0	0	0	0

== Milestones ==
Regular Season
Player	Milestone	Reached
Maxim Lapierre	1st StL Blues Goal	November 7, 2013
Brian Elliott	100th Career Win	November 7, 2013
Brenden Morrow	300th Career Assist	December 19, 2013
Dmitrij Jaskin	1st NHL Goal	December 28, 2013
Ty Rattie	1st NHL Game	April 11, 2014
Adam Cracknell, Jaden Schwartz, Vladimir Tarasenko	1st NHL playoff Goal	April 17, 2014

== Awards ==
Regular Season
Player	Award	Awarded
Alexander Steen	NHL First Star of the Month (Oct.)	November 1, 2013
Chris Stewart	NHL First Star of the Week (ending Dec. 22)	December 23, 2013
Brian Elliott	NHL Second Star of the Week (ending Jan. 5)	January 6, 2014
T. J. Oshie	NHL Third Star of the Week (ending Mar. 30)	March 31, 2014
Jake Allen	AHL's Baz Bastien Memorial Award Outstanding Goaltender, 2013–14	April 17, 2014

== Transactions ==
The Blues were involved in the following transactions during the 2013–14 season

=== Trades ===
Date	Details
June 30, 2013	To Edmonton Oilers 3rd-round pick in 2013; 4th-round pick in 2013; 4th-round pick in 2013	To St. Louis Blues 2nd-round pick in 2013
June 30, 2013	To Nashville Predators 7th-round pick in 2013; 4th-round pick in 2014	To St. Louis Blues 4th-round pick in 2013
July 5, 2013	To Calgary Flames Kris Russell	To St. Louis Blues 5th-round pick in 2014
July 8, 2013	To Ottawa Senators Future considerations	To St. Louis Blues Pat Cannone
July 10, 2013	To Edmonton Oilers David Perron; 3rd-round pick in 2015	To St. Louis Blues Magnus Paajarvi; 2nd-round pick in 2014; 4th-round pick in 2015
February 28, 2014	To Buffalo Sabres Jaroslav Halak; Chris Stewart; William Carrier; 1st-round pick in 2015; Conditional 3rd-round pick in 2016	To St. Louis Blues Ryan Miller; Steve Ott
March 2, 2014	To Florida Panthers Mark Mancari	To St. Louis Blues Eric Selleck

=== Player signings ===
Player	Date	Contract terms
Jordan Leopold (D)	July 3, 2013	2 years, $4.5 million
Chris Stewart (RW)	July 19, 2013	2 years, $8.3 million
Jake Allen (G)	July 25, 2013	2 years, $1.6 million
Jay Bouwmeester (D)	August 1, 2013	5 years, $27 million contract extension
Magnus Paajarvi (LW)	August 2, 2013	2 years, $2.4 million
William Carrier (LW)	August 19, 2013	3 years, $2.725 million entry-level contract
Alex Pietrangelo (D)	September 13, 2013	7 years, $45.5 million
Alexander Steen (LW)	December 19, 2013	3 years, $17.4 million
Ryan Reaves (RW)	January 10, 2014	4 years, $4.5 million
Thomas Vannelli (D)	March 17, 2014	3 years, $2.2275 million entry-level contract
Zach Pochiro (F)	March 19, 2014	3 years, $1.99 million entry-level contract
Petteri Lindbohm (D)	March 21, 2014	3 years, $1.91 million entry-level contract
Brian Elliott (G)	May 19, 2014	3 years, $7.5 million contract extension

=== Free agents signed ===
Player	Date	Former team	Contract terms
Maxim Lapierre (C)	July 5, 2013	Vancouver Canucks	2 years, $2.2 million
Mark Mancari (RW)	July 5, 2013	Rochester Americans	1 year, $600,000
Alexandre Bolduc (C)	July 5, 2013	Phoenix Coyotes	1 year, $550,000
Keith Aucoin (C)	July 5, 2013	New York Islanders	1 year, $625,000
Derek Roy (C)	July 11, 2013	Vancouver Canucks	1 year, $4 million
Brenden Morrow (LW)	Sep 23, 2013	Pittsburgh Penguins	1 year, $1.5 million
Carlo Colaiacovo (D)	Nov 14, 2013	Detroit Red Wings	1 year, min. $449,390
Joakim Lindstrom	May 28, 2014	Skellefteå AIK (SHL)	1 year, $700,000

=== Free agents lost ===
Player	New team	Contract terms

=== Claimed via waivers ===
Player	Former team	Date claimed off waivers

=== Lost via waivers ===
Player	New team	Date claimed off waivers

=== Lost via retirement ===
Player	Date
Scott Nichol	June 5, 2013
Andy McDonald	June 6, 2013

== Farm teams ==
=== Chicago Wolves ===
The Peoria (Illinois) Rivermen were the Blues American Hockey League affiliate in 2012–13

On April 1, 2013, the Blues announced that the Vancouver Canucks on March 29 agreed to buy the Rivermen from the Blues, pending approval from the NHL. It was expected the Blues would affiliate with the AHL's Chicago Wolves for the 2013–14 season. The Blues officially announced their affiliation with the Wolves on April 23, for at least three seasons. They played in the Allstate Arena in the Chicago suburb of Rosemont. The team was formerly affiliated with the Vancouver Canucks from 2011 to 2013, and the Atlanta Thrashers from 2001 to 2011. The swap was hard to take for the fans of the team, but the team's attendance was light, and the sponsorship not very strong. The team was one of the premier franchises in the AHL. The team's owner was Don Levin, coached by Scott Arniel, and their GM was Wendell Young.

=== St. Charles Chill ===
The Blues announced an affiliation with the St. Charles Chill of the Central Hockey League on October 17, and join the Chicago Wolves as a source for player development. The Chill begin their inaugural season on October 19, and played at the Family Arena in St. Charles.

== Draft picks ==
St. Louis Blues' picks at the 2013 NHL entry draft, to be held in Newark, New Jersey on June 30, 2013.

Round	#	Player	Pos	Nationality	College/Junior/Club team (League)
2	47^{[a]}	Tommy Vannelli	D	United States	Minnetonka High School (MSHSL)
2	57^{[b]}	William Carrier	LW	Canada	Cape Breton Screaming Eagles (QMJHL)
4	112^{[c]}	Zach Pochiro	LW	United States	Prince George Cougars (WHL)
6	173	Santeri Saari	D	Finland	Jokerit (SM-liiga)

Draft notes

- The St. Louis Blues' first-round pick went to the Calgary Flames as the result of an April 1, 2013, trade that sent Jay Bouwmeester to the Blues in exchange for Mark Cundari, the rights to Reto Berra, a 2014 first-round pick and this pick.
- ^{a} The Ottawa Senators' second-round pick went to the St. Louis Blues as a result of a February 26, 2012, trade that sent Ben Bishop to the Senators in exchange for this pick.
- The St. Louis Blues' second-round pick went to the Buffalo Sabres as the result of a March 30, 2013, trade that sent Jordan Leopold to the Blues in exchange for a 2013 fifth-round pick and this pick.
- ^{b} The Los Angeles Kings' second-round pick went to the St. Louis Blues as the result of a trade on June 30, 2013, that sent Tampa Bay's fourth-round pick in 2013 (94th overall) and St. Louis' third and fourth-round picks in 2013 (83rd and 113th overall) to Edmonton in exchange for this pick.
  Edmonton had acquired this pick as the result of a trade on June 30, 2013, that sent a second-round pick in 2013 (37th overall) to Los Angeles in exchange for a third-round pick in 2013 (88th overall), Carolina's fourth-round pick in 2013 (96th overall) and this pick.
- The St. Louis Blues' third-round pick went to the Edmonton Oilers as the result of a trade on June 30, 2013, that sent Los Angeles' second-round pick in 2013 (57th overall) to St. Louis in exchange for Tampa Bay's fourth-round pick in 2013 (94th overall), a fourth-round pick in 2013 (113th overall) and this pick.
- The Tampa Bay Lightning's fourth-round pick went to the Edmonton Oilers as the result of a trade on June 30, 2013, that sent Los Angeles' second-round pick in 2013 (57th overall) to St. Louis in exchange for a third and fourth-round pick in 2013 (83rd and 113th overall) and this pick.
  St. Louis had acquired this pick as the result of a trade on July 10, 2012, that sent B. J. Crombeen and a fifth-round pick in 2014 to Tampa Bay in exchange for a fourth-round pick in 2014 and this pick.
- ^{c} The Toronto Maple Leafs' fourth-round pick went to the St. Louis Blues as the result of a trade on June 30, 2013, that sent a seventh-round pick in 2013 (203rd overall) and a fourth-round pick in 2014 to Nashville in exchange for this pick.
  Nashville had acquired this pick as the result of a trade on July 3, 2011, that sent Cody Franson and Matthew Lombardi to Toronto in exchange for Brett Lebda, Robert Slaney and this pick (being conditional at the time of the trade). The condition – Lombardi plays in 60 or more regular season games over the course of the 2011–12 and 2012–13 NHL seasons – was converted on April 3, 2012.
- The St. Louis Blues' fourth-round pick went to the Edmonton Oilers as the result of a trade on June 30, 2013, that sent Los Angeles' second-round pick in 2013 (57th overall) to St. Louis in exchange for a third-round pick in 2013 (83rd overall), Tampa Bay's fourth-round pick in 2013 (94th overall) and this pick.
- The St. Louis Blues' fifth-round pick went to the Buffalo Sabres as the result of a March 30, 2013, trade that sent Jordan Leopold to the Blues in exchange for a 2013 second-round pick and this pick.
- The St. Louis Blues' seventh-round pick went to the Nashville Predators as the result of a trade on June 30, 2013, that sent Toronto's fourth-round pick in 2013 (112th overall) to St. Louis in exchange for a fourth-round pick in 2014 and this pick.
