= 2013–14 Chicago Blackhawks season =

National Hockey League team season

2013–14 Chicago Blackhawks
- Division: 3rd Central
- Conference: 5th Western
- 2013–14 record: 46–21–15
- Home record: 27–7–7
- Road record: 19–14–8
- Goals for: 267
- Goals against: 220

Team information
- General manager: Stan Bowman
- Coach: Joel Quenneville
- Captain: Jonathan Toews
- Alternate captains: Duncan Keith; Patrick Sharp
- Arena: United Center; Soldier Field (1 game)
- Average attendance: 22,623 (21,615, 109.6% at UC); Total: 927,545 (864,624 at UC)
- Minor league affiliates: Rockford IceHogs (AHL); Toledo Walleye (ECHL)

Team leaders
- Goals: Patrick Sharp (34)
- Assists: Duncan Keith (55)
- Points: Patrick Sharp (78)
- Penalty minutes: Brandon Bollig (92)
- Plus/minus: Marian Hossa (+28)
- Wins: Corey Crawford (32)
- Goals against average: Corey Crawford (2.26)

The 2013–14 Chicago Blackhawks season was the 88th season for the National Hockey League (NHL) franchise that was established on September 25, 1926. The Blackhawks were attempting to repeat as Stanley Cup champions, a feat that had not been accomplished in the NHL since the Detroit Red Wings won consecutive championships in 1997 and 1998.

== Regular season ==
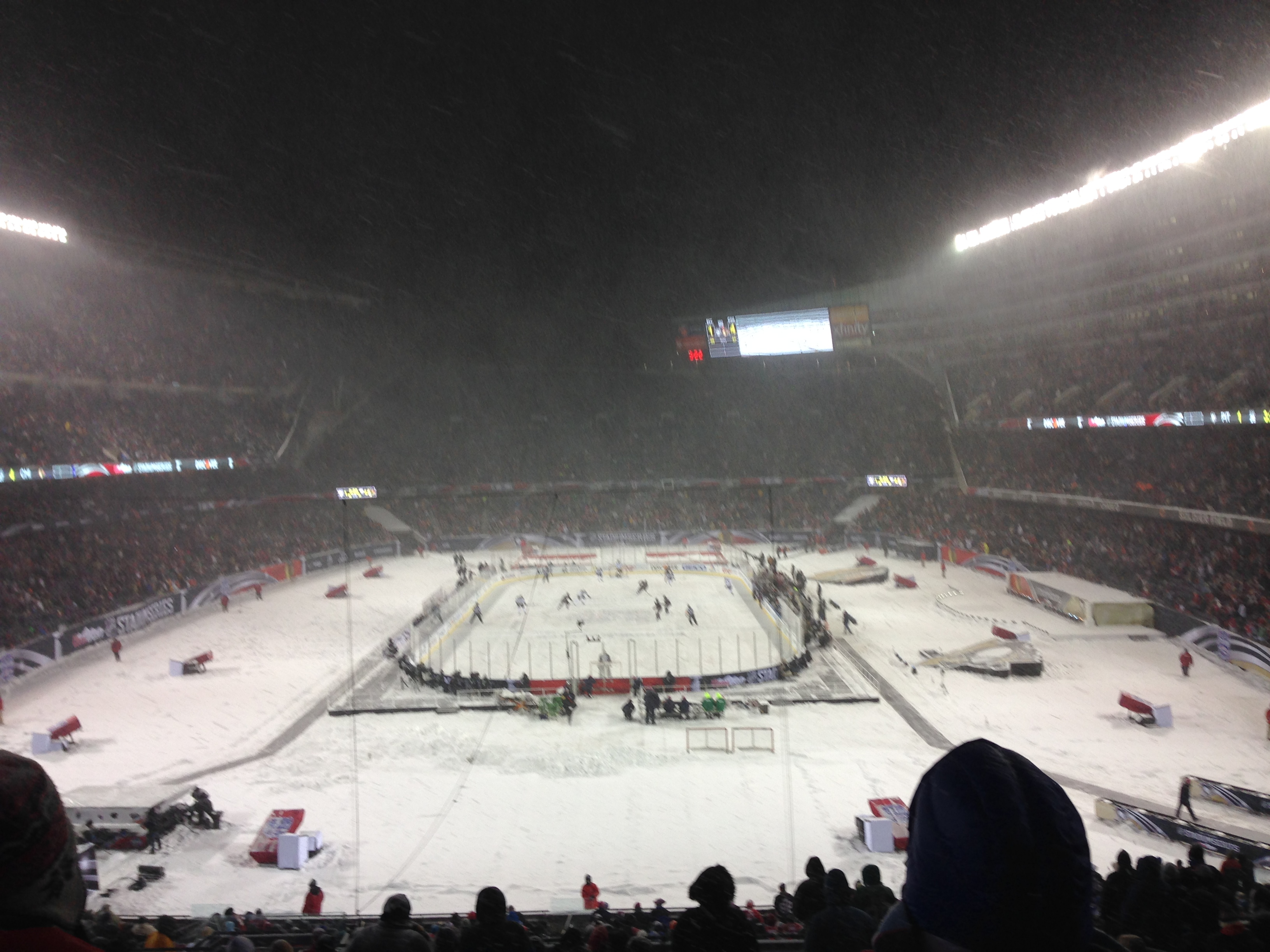
The 2014 NHL Stadium Series at Soldier Field.

As the defending Stanley Cup Champions, the Blackhawks kicked off the 2013–14 regular season on October 1, 2013, with a 30-minute Banner Raising Ceremony at the United Center to celebrate its historical 2012–13 season. Banners were raised to mark the Blackhawks's clinch of the Central Division, Western Conference, Presidents' Trophy and the Stanley Cup Championship. The Blackhawks then went on to defeat the Washington Capitals in its home opener, and became the first team since the 2008–09 Pittsburgh Penguins to do so. However, unlike the previous season where the Blackhawks were undefeated for the first six games of the season, they quickly fell against the Tampa Bay Lightning and division rival St. Louis Blues in the next two games.

On October 15, with a win against the Carolina Hurricanes, the Blackhawks celebrated its 2,500th regular season win in franchise history.

On January 29, with a win against the Vancouver Canucks, Joel Quenneville reached 693 coaching wins, moving him into sole possession of 3rd place in all-time wins.

On February 3, the Blackhawks played their 6,000th regular season game in franchise history with a 5–3 win over the Los Angeles Kings.

On March 1, the Blackhawks played in their 2nd outdoor game in franchise history at Soldier Field, Home of the Chicago Bears football team. The outdoor game was in part of the new NHL Stadium Series. The Blackhawks hosted the Pittsburgh Penguins as Captains Jonathan Toews and Sidney Crosby would play against each other for the first time ever. In front of a sold out crowd of 62,921, The Blackhawks defeated the Penguins 5-1 in a classic winter storm setting.

On March 19, with a win against the rival St. Louis Blues, Joel Quenneville reached 700 coaching wins.

== Standings ==
Central Division
Pos	Team	GP	W	L	OTL	ROW	GF	GA	GD	Pts
1	y – Colorado Avalanche	82	52	22	8	47	250	220	+30	112
2	x – St. Louis Blues	82	52	23	7	43	248	191	+57	111
3	x – Chicago Blackhawks	82	46	21	15	40	267	220	+47	107
4	Minnesota Wild	82	43	27	12	35	207	206	+1	98
5	Dallas Stars	82	40	31	11	36	235	228	+7	91
6	Nashville Predators	82	38	32	12	36	216	242	−26	88
7	Winnipeg Jets	82	37	35	10	29	227	237	−10	84

Source: National Hockey League
x – Clinched playoff spot; y – Clinched division

== Schedule and results ==
=== Pre-season ===
2013 pre-season: 4–0–2 (Home: 2–0–1; Road: 2–0–1)
#	Date	Opponent	Score	OT	Decision	Arena	Attendance	Record	Recap
1	September 17	Detroit Red Wings	2–0		Crawford	United Center	20,071	1–0–0	W1
2	September 19	Pittsburgh Penguins	3–4	SO	Khabibulin	United Center	20,150	1–0–1	SOL1
3	September 20	@ Washington Capitals	5–4	SO	Raanta	Verizon Center	17,047	2–0–1	W1
4	September 22	@ Detroit Red Wings	4–3		Crawford	Joe Louis Arena	15,022	3–0–1	W2
5	September 23	@ Pittsburgh Penguins	2–3	SO	Khabibulin	Consol Energy Center	17,525	3–0–2	SOL1
6	September 28	Washington Capitals	4–3	OT	Khabibulin	United Center	20,650	4–0–2	W1

=== Regular season ===
Legend: Win (2 points) Loss (0 points) Overtime/shootout loss (1 point)

2013–14 season

October: 8–2–3 (Home: 5–1–2; Road: 3–1–1) Pts. 19
#	Date	Opponent	Score	OT	Decision	Arena	Attendance	Record	Pts	Recap
1	October 1	Washington Capitals	6–4		Crawford	United Center	22,158	1–0–0	2	W1
2	October 5	Tampa Bay Lightning	2–3	SO	Crawford	United Center	21,563	1–0–1	3	SOL1
3	October 9	@ St. Louis Blues	2–3		Crawford	Scottrade Center	16,565	1–1–1	3	L1
4	October 11	New York Islanders	3–2		Khabibulin	United Center	21,196	2–1–1	5	W1
5	October 12	Buffalo Sabres	2–1		Crawford	United Center	21,261	3–1–1	7	W2
6	October 15	@ Carolina Hurricanes	3–2	SO	Crawford	PNC Arena	16,263	4–1–1	9	W3
7	October 17	St. Louis Blues	2–3	SO	Crawford	United Center	21,169	4–1–2	10	SOL1
8	October 19	Toronto Maple Leafs	3–1		Crawford	United Center	21,801	5–1–2	12	W1
9	October 22	@ Florida Panthers	3–2	SO	Crawford	BB&T Center	15,779	6–1–2	14	W2
10	October 24	@ Tampa Bay Lightning	5–6	OT	Khabibulin	Tampa Bay Times Forum	18,820	6–1–3	15	OTL1
11	October 26	Minnesota Wild	3–5		Crawford	United Center	21,521	6–2–3	15	L1
12	October 28	@ Minnesota Wild	5–1		Crawford	Xcel Energy Center	18,685	7–2–3	17	W1
13	October 29	Ottawa Senators	6–5		Crawford	United Center	21,123	8–2–3	19	W2

November: 12–2–1 (Home: 4–0–1; Road: 8–2–0) Pts. 25
#	Date	Opponent	Score	OT	Decision	Arena	Attendance	Record	Pts	Recap
14	November 2	@ Winnipeg Jets	5–1		Crawford	MTS Centre	15,004	9–2–3	21	W3
15	November 3	Calgary Flames	2–3	OT	Crawford	United Center	21,229	9–2–4	22	OTL1
16	November 6	Winnipeg Jets	4–1		Crawford	United Center	21,122	10–2–4	24	W1
17	November 9	@ Dallas Stars	5–2		Crawford	American Airlines Center	17,167	11–2–4	26	W2
18	November 10	Edmonton Oilers	5–4		Crawford	United Center	21,185	12–2–4	28	W3
19	November 14	Phoenix Coyotes	5–4	SO	Crawford	United Center	21,762	13–2–4	30	W4
20	November 16	@ Nashville Predators	2–7		Crawford	Bridgestone Arena	17,113	13–3–4	30	L1
21	November 17	San Jose Sharks	5–1		Crawford	United Center	21,434	14–3–4	32	W1
22	November 19	@ Colorado Avalanche	1–5		Crawford	Pepsi Center	17,348	14–4–4	32	L1
23	November 21	@ Winnipeg Jets	6–3		Crawford	MTS Centre	15,004	15–4–4	34	W1
24	November 23	@ Vancouver Canucks	2–1		Crawford	Rogers Arena	18,910	16–4–4	36	W2
25	November 25	@ Edmonton Oilers	5–1		Crawford	Rexall Place	16,839	17–4–4	38	W3
26	November 27	@ Calgary Flames	3–2		Raanta	Scotiabank Saddledome	19,289	18–4–4	40	W4
27	November 29	@ Dallas Stars	2–1	SO	Crawford	American Airlines Center	18,532	19–4–4	42	W5
28	November 30	@ Phoenix Coyotes	5–2		Raanta	Jobing.com Arena	17,321	20–4–4	44	W6

December: 8–3–3 (Home: 6–1–2; Road: 2–2–1) Pts. 19
#	Date	Opponent	Score	OT	Decision	Arena	Attendance	Record	Pts	Recap
29	December 3	Dallas Stars	3–4		Crawford	United Center	21,411	20–5–4	44	L1
30	December 5	@ Minnesota Wild	3–4		Crawford	Xcel Energy Center	18,852	20–6–4	44	L2
31	December 6	Anaheim Ducks	2–3	SO	Raanta	United Center	21,586	20–6–5	45	SOL1
32	December 8	Florida Panthers	6–2		Raanta	United Center	21,119	21–6–5	47	W1
33	December 10	@ Dallas Stars	6–2		Raanta	American Airlines Center	12,542	22–6–5	49	W2
34	December 11	Philadelphia Flyers	7–2		Raanta	United Center	21,144	23–6–5	51	W3
35	December 14	@ Toronto Maple Leafs	3–7		Raanta	Air Canada Centre	19,603	23–7–5	51	L1
36	December 15	Los Angeles Kings	3–1		Raanta	United Center	21,426	24–7–5	53	W1
37	December 17	@ Nashville Predators	3–1		Raanta	Bridgestone Arena	16,219	25–7–5	55	W2
38	December 20	Vancouver Canucks	2–3	SO	Raanta	United Center	21,966	25–7–6	56	SOL1
39	December 23	New Jersey Devils	5–2		Raanta	United Center	22,019	26–7–6	58	W1
40	December 27	Colorado Avalanche	7–2		Raanta	United Center	22,201	27–7–6	60	W2
41	December 28	@ St. Louis Blues	5–6	SO	Raanta	Scottrade Center	20,082	27–7–7	61	SOL1
42	December 30	Los Angeles Kings	1–0		Raanta	United Center	22,161	28–7–7	63	W1

January: 5–3–6 (Home: 3–2–2; Road: 2–1–4) Pts. 16
#	Date	Opponent	Score	OT	Decision	Arena	Attendance	Record	Pts	Recap
43	January 2	@ New York Islanders	2–3	OT	Crawford	Nassau Veterans Memorial Coliseum	13,618	28–7–8	64	OTL1
44	January 3	@ New Jersey Devils	5–3		Raanta	Prudential Center	16,592	29–7–8	66	W1
45	January 5	San Jose Sharks	2–3	SO	Crawford	United Center	21,599	29–7–9	67	SOL1
46	January 8	New York Rangers	2–3		Crawford	United Center	21,493	29–8–9	67	L1
47	January 11	@ Montreal Canadiens	1–2	OT	Crawford	Bell Centre	21,273	29–8–10	68	OTL1
48	January 12	Edmonton Oilers	5–3		Raanta	United Center	21,424	30–8–10	70	W1
49	January 14	Colorado Avalanche	2–3	OT	Crawford	United Center	21,412	30–8–11	71	OTL1
50	January 17	Anaheim Ducks	4–2		Crawford	United Center	22,064	31–8–11	73	W1
51	January 19	Boston Bruins	3–2	SO	Crawford	United Center	22,197	32–8–11	75	W2
52	January 22	@ Detroit Red Wings	4–5	SO	Crawford	Joe Louis Arena	20,066	32–8–12	76	SOL1
53	January 23	@ Minnesota Wild	1–2		Raanta	Xcel Energy Center	19,226	32–9–12	76	L1
54	January 26	Winnipeg Jets	1–3		Crawford	United Center	21,841	32–10–12	76	L2
55	January 28	@ Calgary Flames	4–5	OT	Crawford	Scotiabank Saddledome	19,289	32–10–13	77	OTL1
56	January 29	@ Vancouver Canucks	5–2		Crawford	Rogers Arena	18,910	33–10–13	79	W1

February: 2–2–1 (Home: 0–0–0; Road: 2–2–1) Pts. 5
#	Date	Opponent	Score	OT	Decision	Arena	Attendance	Record	Pts	Recap
57	February 1	@ San Jose Sharks	1–2	SO	Crawford	SAP Center at San Jose	17,562	33–10–14	80	SOL1
58	February 3	@ Los Angeles Kings	5–3		Crawford	Staples Center	18,118	34–10–14	82	W1
59	February 5	@ Anaheim Ducks	2–0		Crawford	Honda Center	17,446	35–10–14	84	W2
60	February 7	@ Phoenix Coyotes	0–2		Crawford	Jobing.com Arena	17,525	35–11–14	84	L1
61	February 27	@ New York Rangers	1–2		Crawford	Madison Square Garden	18,006	35–12–14	84	L2

March: 7–7–1 (Home: 6–3–0; Road: 1–4–1) Pts. 15
#	Date	Opponent	Score	OT	Decision	Arena	Attendance	Record	Pts	Recap
62	March 1*	Pittsburgh Penguins	5–1		Crawford	Soldier Field	62,921	36–12–14	86	W1
63	March 4	Colorado Avalanche	2–4		Crawford	United Center	21,361	36–13–14	86	L1
64	March 6	Columbus Blue Jackets	6–1		Crawford	United Center	21,179	37–13–14	88	W1
65	March 9	@ Buffalo Sabres	2–1		Crawford	First Niagara Center	19,070	38–13–14	90	W2
66	March 12	@ Colorado Avalanche	2–3		Raanta	Pepsi Center	18,007	38–14–14	90	L1
67	March 14	Nashville Predators	2–3		Crawford	United Center	22,106	38–15–14	90	L2
68	March 16	Detroit Red Wings	4–1		Crawford	United Center	22,128	39–15–14	92	W1
69	March 18	@ Philadelphia Flyers	2–3	OT	Raanta	Wells Fargo Center	19,932	39–15–15	93	OTL1
70	March 19	St. Louis Blues	4–0		Crawford	United Center	21,640	40–15–15	95	W1
71	March 21	Carolina Hurricanes	3–2		Crawford	United Center	21,857	41–15–15	97	W2
72	March 23	Nashville Predators	0–2		Crawford	United Center	21,727	41–16–15	97	L1
73	March 25	Dallas Stars	4–2		Crawford	United Center	21,493	42–16–15	99	W1
74	March 27	@ Boston Bruins	0–3		Crawford	TD Garden	17,565	42–17–15	99	L1
75	March 28	@ Ottawa Senators	3–5		Raanta	Canadian Tire Centre	18,922	42–18–15	99	L2
76	March 30	@ Pittsburgh Penguins	1–4		Crawford	Consol Energy Center	18,655	42–19–15	99	L3
*2014 NHL Stadium Series

April: 4–2–0 (Home: 3–0–0; Road: 1–2–0) Pts. 8
#	Date	Opponent	Score	OT	Decision	Arena	Attendance	Record	Pts	Recap
77	April 3	Minnesota Wild	3–2	SO	Crawford	United Center	21,791	43–19–15	101	W1
78	April 4	@ Columbus Blue Jackets	4–3		Raanta	Nationwide Arena	18,695	44–19–15	103	W2
79	April 6	St. Louis Blues	4–2		Crawford	United Center	22,184	45–19–15	105	W3
80	April 9	Montreal Canadiens	3–2	OT	Crawford	United Center	21,571	46–19–15	107	W4
81	April 11	@ Washington Capitals	0–4		Crawford	Verizon Center	18,506	46–20–15	107	L1
82	April 12	@ Nashville Predators	5–7		Raanta	Bridgestone Arena	17,355	46–21–15	107	L2

=== Detailed records ===
Western Conference
Opponent	Home	Away	Total	Pts.	Goals scored	Goals allowed
Central Division
Chicago Blackhawks	–	–	–	–	–	–
Colorado Avalanche	1–1–1	0–2–0	1–3–1	3	14	17
Dallas Stars	1–1–0	3–0–0	4–1–0	8	20	11
Minnesota Wild	1–1–0	1–2–0	2–3–0	4	15	14
Nashville Predators	0–2–0	1–2–0	1–4–0	2	12	20
St. Louis Blues	2–0–1	0–1–1	2–1–2	6	17	14
Winnipeg Jets	1–1–0	2–0–0	3–1–0	6	16	8
	6–6–2	7–7–1	13–13–3	29	94	84
Pacific Division
Anaheim Ducks	1–0–1	1–0–0	2–0–1	5	8	5
Calgary Flames	0–0–1	1–0–1	1–0–2	4	9	10
Edmonton Oilers	2–0–0	1–0–0	3–0–0	6	15	8
Los Angeles Kings	2–0–0	1–0–0	3–0–0	6	9	4
Phoenix Coyotes	1–0–0	1–1–0	2–1–0	4	10	8
San Jose Sharks	1–0–1	0–0–1	1–0–2	4	8	6
Vancouver Canucks	0–0–1	2–0–0	2–0–1	5	9	6
	7–0–4	7–1–2	14–1–6	34	68	47

Eastern Conference
Opponent	Home	Away	Total	Pts.	Goals scored	Goals allowed
Atlantic Division
Boston Bruins	1–0–0	0–1–0	1–1–0	2	3	5
Buffalo Sabres	1–0–0	1–0–0	2–0–0	4	4	2
Detroit Red Wings	1–0–0	0–0–1	1–0–1	3	8	6
Florida Panthers	1–0–0	1–0–0	2–0–0	4	9	4
Montreal Canadiens	1–0–0	0–0–1	1–0–1	3	4	4
Ottawa Senators	1–0–0	0–1–0	1–1–0	2	9	10
Tampa Bay Lightning	0–0–1	0–0–1	0–0–2	2	7	9
Toronto Maple Leafs	1–0–0	0–1–0	1–1–0	2	6	8
	7–0–1	2–3–3	9–3–4	22	50	48
Metropolitan Division
Carolina Hurricanes	1–0–0	1–0–0	2–0–0	4	6	4
Columbus Blue Jackets	1–0–0	1–0–0	2–0–0	4	10	4
New Jersey Devils	1–0–0	1–0–0	2–0–0	4	10	5
New York Islanders	1–0–0	0–0–1	1–0–1	3	5	5
New York Rangers	0–1–0	0–1–0	0–2–0	0	3	5
Philadelphia Flyers	1–0–0	0–0–1	1–0–1	3	9	5
Pittsburgh Penguins	1–0–0	0–1–0	1–1–0	2	6	5
Washington Capitals	1–0–0	0–1–0	1–1–0	2	6	8
	7–1–0	3–3–2	10–4–2	22	55	41

== Playoffs ==
The Blackhawks qualified for the playoffs for the sixth consecutive season. After finishing third in the Central division and fifth in the Western Conference, the Blackhawks played against the St. Louis Blues, who finished second in the Central Division and fourth in the Western Conference in the season's new playoff format.

During the first round against the St. Louis Blues the Blackhawks fell to an early 2–0 deficit in the series with two overtime losses of 4–3 each in St. Louis. The Blackhawks would rally back with 4 consecutive wins to win the best of 7 series. In game 3, Corey Crawford's stellar performance earned him a 2–0 shutout and the 1st star of the game. In Game 4, the Blackhawks had a 2–1 lead until the Blues tied the game with 4.6 seconds left in the 2nd period. The Blues would take the lead in the 3rd period with 7:33 left. The Blackhawks tied the game at 3 with Bryan Bickell's redirect with 3:52 left. In overtime Patrick Kane would score the game-winning goal with 8:43 left. With the series tied 2, game 5 would return to St. Louis with another overtime game as Jonathan Toews scored on a breakaway with 12:25 left to take a 3–2 series lead back to Chicago. In game 6 the Blackhawks would take 1–1 tie into the 3rd period. The Blackhawks would score four goals from Jonathan Toews, Patrick Sharp, Andrew Shaw and Duncan Keith to win the game 5–1 and the series 4–2.

The Blackhawks played the Minnesota Wild in the Second Round, a rematch of 2013 Conference Quarterfinals where the Blackhawks won in 5 games. This time around, the Blackhawks won in 6 games.

On May 4, Joel Quenneville won his 800th coached NHL game for both the regular season and playoffs combined. The Blackhawks won Game 2 against the Wild 4–1.

In a back-and-forth series against the Los Angeles Kings in the Western Conference Finals for the second straight season, the Blackhawks lost in 7 games.

2014 Stanley Cup playoffs

Western Conference First Round vs. (C2) St. Louis Blues – Blackhawks won series 4–2
Game	Date	Opponent	Score	OT	Decision	Arena	Attendance	Series	Recap
1	April 17	@ St. Louis Blues	3–4	0:26 3OT	Crawford	Scottrade Center	19,423	0–1	L1
2	April 19	@ St. Louis Blues	3–4	5:50 OT	Crawford	Scottrade Center	19,639	0–2	L2
3	April 21	St. Louis Blues	2–0		Crawford	United Center	22,112	1–2	W1
4	April 23	St. Louis Blues	4–3	11:17 OT	Crawford	United Center	22,123	2–2	W2
5	April 25	@ St. Louis Blues	3–2	7:36 OT	Crawford	Scottrade Center	19,796	3–2	W3
6	April 27	St. Louis Blues	5–1		Crawford	United Center	22,144	4–2	W4

Western Conference Second Round vs. (WC1) Minnesota Wild – Blackhawks won series 4–2
Game	Date	Opponent	Score	OT	Decision	Arena	Attendance	Series	Recap
1	May 2	Minnesota Wild	5–2		Crawford	United Center	22,116	1–0	W5
2	May 4	Minnesota Wild	4–1		Crawford	United Center	22,018	2–0	W6
3	May 6	@ Minnesota Wild	0–4		Crawford	Xcel Energy Center	19,416	2–1	L1
4	May 9	@ Minnesota Wild	2–4		Crawford	Xcel Energy Center	19,405	2–2	L2
5	May 11	Minnesota Wild	2–1		Crawford	United Center	22,016	3–2	W1
6	May 13	@ Minnesota Wild	2–1	9:42 OT	Crawford	Xcel Energy Center	19,396	4–2	W2

Western Conference Finals vs. (P3) Los Angeles Kings – Kings won series 4–3
Game	Date	Opponent	Score	OT	Decision	Arena	Attendance	Series	Recap
1	May 18	Los Angeles Kings	3–1		Crawford	United Center	21,832	1–0	W3
2	May 21	Los Angeles Kings	2–6		Crawford	United Center	22,019	1–1	L1
3	May 24	@ Los Angeles Kings	3–4		Crawford	Staples Center	18,374	1–2	L2
4	May 26	@ Los Angeles Kings	2–5		Crawford	Staples Center	18,468	1–3	L3
5	May 28	Los Angeles Kings	5–4	2:04 2OT	Crawford	United Center	21,871	2–3	W1
6	May 30	@ Los Angeles Kings	4–3		Crawford	Staples Center	18,471	3–3	W2
7	June 1	Los Angeles Kings	4–5	5:47 OT	Crawford	United Center	22,315	3–4	L1

Legend: Win Loss

== Player statistics ==
Final Stats

=== Skaters ===
Note: Pos = Position; GP = Games played; G = Goals; A = Assists; Pts = Points; PIM = Penalty minutes; +/- = Plus/minus; PPG = Power-play goals; SHG = Short-handed goals; GWG = Game-winning goals

Regular season
Player	GP	G	A	Pts	+/-	PIM
Patrick Sharp	82	34	44	78	13	40
Patrick Kane	69	29	40	69	7	22
Jonathan Toews	76	28	40	68	26	34
Duncan Keith	79	6	55	61	22	28
Marian Hossa	72	30	30	60	28	20
Brandon Saad	78	19	28	47	20	20
Brent Seabrook	82	7	34	41	23	22
Andrew Shaw	80	20	19	39	12	76
Nick Leddy	82	7	24	31	10	10
Kris Versteeg^{†}	63	10	19	29	9	27
Marcus Kruger	81	8	20	28	6	36
Ben Smith	75	14	12	26	3	2
Niklas Hjalmarsson	81	4	22	26	11	34
Michal Handzus	59	4	12	16	0	16
Johnny Oduya	77	3	13	16	11	38
Bryan Bickell	59	11	4	15	−6	28
Brandon Bollig	82	7	7	14	−1	92
Brandon Pirri^{‡}	28	6	5	11	6	6
Jeremy Morin	24	5	6	11	5	32
Michal Rozsival	42	1	7	8	7	32
Sheldon Brookbank	48	2	5	7	2	52
Peter Regin^{†}	17	2	2	4	5	2
Michael Kostka^{‡}	9	2	1	3	3	8
Joakim Nordstrom	16	1	2	3	−2	2
Matt Carey	2	1	0	1	−1	2
David Rundblad^{†}	5	0	0	0	−1	0
Brad Mills	3	0	0	0	−1	0
Teuvo Teravainen	3	0	0	0	0	0
Jimmy Hayes^{‡}	2	0	0	0	1	0
Totals	82	253	445	698	208	667

Playoffs
Player	GP	G	A	Pts	+/-	PIM
Patrick Kane	19	8	12	20	5	8
Jonathan Toews	19	9	8	17	3	8
Brandon Saad	19	6	10	16	10	6
Brent Seabrook	16	3	12	15	0	21
Marian Hossa	19	2	12	14	0	8
Duncan Keith	19	4	7	11	7	8
Bryan Bickell	19	7	3	10	1	8
Patrick Sharp	19	5	5	10	−2	6
Andrew Shaw	12	2	6	8	5	12
Johnny Oduya	19	2	5	7	−1	8
Ben Smith	19	4	2	6	5	2
Michal Rozsival	17	1	5	6	−2	8
Nick Leddy	18	1	4	5	−3	6
Marcus Kruger	19	1	3	4	−1	6
Niklas Hjalmarsson	19	0	4	4	−3	14
Michal Handzus	19	2	1	3	−8	8
Kris Versteeg	15	1	2	3	−5	4
Sheldon Brookbank	7	0	2	2	3	0
Brandon Bollig	15	0	1	1	−6	16
Jeremy Morin	2	0	0	0	−1	2
Peter Regin	5	0	0	0	−1	0
Joakim Nordstrom	7	0	0	0	−4	0
Totals	19	58	104	162	1	163

=== Goaltenders ===
Regular season
Player	GP	GS	TOI	W	L	OT	GA	GAA	SA	SV%	SO	G	A	PIM
Corey Crawford	59	56	3395:01	32	16	10	128	2.26	1533	.917	2	0	1	0
Antti Raanta	25	22	1396:40	13	5	4	63	2.71	610	.897	1	0	1	0
Nikolai Khabibulin	4	4	167:39	1	0	1	14	5.00	74	.811	0	0	0	0
Kent Simpson	1	0	20:00	0	0	0	2	6.00	7	.714	0	0	0	0
Totals		82	4979:20	46	21	15	207	2.49	2224	.907	3	0	2	0

Playoffs
Player	GP	GS	TOI	W	L	GA	GAA	SA	SV%	SO	G	A	PIM
Corey Crawford	19	19	1234:00	11	8	52	2.53	590	.912	1	0	0	0

^{†}Denotes player spent time with another team before joining the Blackhawks. Stats reflect time with the Blackhawks only.
^{‡}Traded mid-season
Bold/italics denotes franchise record

== Awards and milestones ==
=== Awards ===
Regular season
Player	Award	Reached
Duncan Keith	James Norris Trophy	June 24, 2014
Duncan Keith	2013-14 NHL First All-Star Team	June 24, 2014

== Transactions ==
The Blackhawks have been involved in the following transactions during the 2013–14 season.

=== Trades ===
Date	Details
June 30, 2013	To Toronto Maple Leafs Dave Bolland	To Chicago Blackhawks 2nd round pick in 2013; ANA's 4th round pick in 2013; 4th round pick in 2014
June 30, 2013	To Winnipeg Jets Michael Frolik	To Chicago Blackhawks 3rd-round pick in 2013; 5th-round pick in 2013
June 30, 2013	To San Jose Sharks ANA's 4th-round pick in 2013; 5th-round pick in 2013	To Chicago Blackhawks 4th-round pick in 2013; 5th-round pick in 2014
July 16, 2013	To Los Angeles Kings Daniel Carcillo	To Chicago Blackhawks Conditional 6th-round pick in 2015
November 14, 2013	To Florida Panthers Jimmy Hayes; Dylan Olsen	To Chicago Blackhawks Kris Versteeg; Philippe Lefebvre
December 6, 2013	To New York Rangers Kyle Beach	To Chicago Blackhawks Brandon Mashinter
December 14, 2013	To Edmonton Oilers Future considerations	To Chicago Blackhawks Jason LaBarbera
February 6, 2014	To New York Islanders 4th-round pick in 2014	To Chicago Blackhawks Pierre-Marc Bouchard; Peter Regin
February 26, 2014	To Minnesota Wild Brad Winchester	To Chicago Blackhawks Brian Connelly
March 2, 2014	To Florida Panthers Brandon Pirri	To Chicago Blackhawks 3rd-round pick in 2014; 5th-round pick in 2016
March 4, 2014	To Phoenix Coyotes 2nd-round pick in 2014	To Chicago Blackhawks David Rundblad; Mathieu Brisebois

=== Free agents acquired ===
Player	Former team	Contract terms
Nikolai Khabibulin	Edmonton Oilers	1 year, $2 million
Theo Peckham	Edmonton Oilers	1 year, $575,000
Mike Kostka	Toronto Maple Leafs	1 year, $625,000
Brad Winchester	Milwaukee Admirals	1 year, $550,000
Matt Carey	St. Lawrence University	2 years, $1.85 million entry-level contract
Trevor van Riemsdyk	University of New Hampshire	2 years, $1.85 million entry-level contract
Dennis Rasmussen	Vaxjo Lakers	1 year, $925,000 entry-level contract

=== Free agents lost ===
Player	New team	Contract terms
Ray Emery	Philadelphia Flyers	1 year, $1.65 million
Viktor Stalberg	Nashville Predators	4 years, $12 million
Henrik Karlsson	Skellefteå AIK	1 year
Rostislav Olesz	New Jersey Devils	1 year, $1 million
Carter Hutton	Nashville Predators	1 year, $550,000

=== Claimed via waivers ===
Player	Old team	Date claimed off waivers

=== Lost via waivers ===
Player	New team	Date claimed off waivers
Ryan Stanton	Vancouver Canucks	September 30, 2013
Mike Kostka	Tampa Bay Lightning	February 23, 2014

=== Player signings ===
Player	Date	Contract terms
Bryan Bickell	June 30, 2013	4 years, $16 million
Nick Leddy	July 3, 2013	2 years, $5.4 million
Michal Handzus	July 5, 2013	1 year, $1 million
Michal Rozsival	July 5, 2013	2 years, $4.4 million
Marcus Kruger	July 12, 2013	2 years, $2.65 million
Ryan Stanton	July 16, 2013	2 years, $1.1 million
Kyle Beach	July 17, 2013	1 year, $550,000
Drew Leblanc	July 19, 2013	2 years, $1.15 million
Teuvo Teravainen	August 22, 2013	3 years, $2.775 million entry-level contract
Corey Crawford	September 2, 2013	6 years, $36 million contract extension
Niklas Hjalmarsson	September 4, 2013	5 years, $20.5 million contract extension
Andrew Shaw	November 12, 2013	2 years, $4 million contract extension
Ryan Hartman	November 18, 2013	3 years, $2.775 million entry-level contract
Brandon Bollig	March 3, 2014	3 years, $3.75 million contract extension
Dillon Fournier	March 10, 2014	3 years, $2.1275 million entry-level contract
Brandon Mashinter	March 19, 2014	2 years, $1.125 million contract extension
Stephen Johns	April 2, 2014	2 years, $1.8 million entry-level contract

== Draft picks ==
The Blackhawks had the following picks at the 2013 NHL entry draft, which was held in Newark, New Jersey, on June 30, 2013.

Round	#	Player	Pos	Nationality	College/junior/club team (league)
1	30	Ryan Hartman	RW	United States	Plymouth (OHL)
2	51	Carl Dahlstrom	D	Sweden	Linkopings Jr. (Sweden-Jr.)
3	74	John Hayden	C	United States	USA NTDP (USHL)
4	111	Robin Norell	D	Sweden	Djurgarden U18 (Sweden-Jr.)
4	121	Tyler Motte	C	United States	USA NTDP (USHL)
5	134	Luke Johnson	C	United States	Lincoln Stars (USHL)
6	181	Anthony Louis	C	United States	USA NTDP (USHL)
7	211	Robin Press	D	Sweden	Sodertalje SK (Sweden-2)

Draft notes

- The Toronto Maple Leafs' second-round pick went to the Chicago Blackhawks as the result of a trade on June 30, 2013, that sent Dave Bolland to Toronto in exchange for Anaheim's fourth-round pick in 2013 (117th overall), Edmonton's fourth-round pick in 2014 and this pick.
- Chicago's second-round pick went to the Winnipeg Jets, as the result of a trade on February 27, 2012, that sent Johnny Oduya to Chicago, in exchange for Chicago's third-round pick in 2013, and this pick.
- The Winnipeg Jets' third-round pick went to the Chicago Blackhawks as the result of a trade on June 30, 2013, that sent Michael Frolik to Winnipeg in exchange for a fifth-round pick in 2013 (134th overall) and this pick.
- Chicago's third-round pick went to the Winnipeg Jets, as the result of a trade on February 27, 2012, that sent Johnny Oduya to Chicago, in exchange for Chicago's second-round pick in 2013, and this pick.
- The San Jose Sharks' fourth-round pick went to the Chicago Blackhawks as the result of a trade on June 30, 2013, that sent Anaheim's fourth-round pick in 2013 (117th overall) and a fifth-round pick in 2013 (151st overall) to San Jose in exchange for a fifth-round pick in 2014 and this pick.
- The Winnipeg Jets' fifth-round pick went to the Chicago Blackhawks as the result of a trade on June 30, 2013, that sent Michael Frolik to Winnipeg in exchange for a third-round pick in 2013 (74th overall) and this pick.
- The Chicago Blackhawks' fifth-round pick went to the San Jose Sharks as the result of a trade on June 30, 2013, that sent a fourth-round pick in 2013 (111th overall) and a fifth-round pick in 2014 to Chicago in exchange for Anaheim's fourth-round pick in 2013 (117th overall) and this pick.
