= 2013–14 Edmonton Oilers season =

NHL team season

2013–14 Edmonton Oilers
- Division: 7th Pacific
- Conference: 14th Western
- 2013–14 record: 29–44–9
- Home record: 16–22–3
- Road record: 13–22–6
- Goals for: 203
- Goals against: 270

Team information
- General manager: Craig MacTavish
- Coach: Dallas Eakins
- Captain: Andrew Ference; Ryan Smyth (one game)
- Alternate captains: Jordan Eberle; Andrew Ference (one game); Sam Gagner; Taylor Hall; Matt Hendricks (Mar.–Apr.); Ryan Nugent-Hopkins; Nick Schultz (Oct.–Mar.); Ryan Smyth
- Arena: Rexall Place
- Average attendance: 16,839 (100%)
- Minor league affiliates: Oklahoma City Barons (AHL); Bakersfield Condors (ECHL)

Team leaders
- Goals: David Perron (28); Jordan Eberle (28)
- Assists: Taylor Hall (53)
- Points: Taylor Hall (80)
- Penalty minutes: Luke Gazdic (127)
- Plus/minus: Ben Eager (+1)
- Wins: Devan Dubnyk (12)
- Goals against average: Viktor Fasth (2.73)

The 2013–14 Edmonton Oilers season was the 35th season for the National Hockey League (NHL) franchise that was established on June 22, 1979, and 42nd season overall, including play in the World Hockey Association. The team would miss the playoffs for the eighth year in a row for the first time in franchise history.

== Off-season ==
On June 8, 2013, the Oilers fired head coach Ralph Krueger. Dallas Eakins was introduced as the new head coach on June 10. In addition to the hiring of Eakins as head coach, the Oilers also appointed Keith Acton as their associate coach on June 28, in addition to their current coaching staff; Kelly Buchberger, Steve Smith and Frederic Chabot.

== Standings ==
Pacific Division
Pos	Team	GP	W	L	OTL	ROW	GF	GA	GD	Pts
1	y – Anaheim Ducks	82	54	20	8	51	266	209	+57	116
2	x – San Jose Sharks	82	51	22	9	41	249	200	+49	111
3	x – Los Angeles Kings	82	46	28	8	38	206	174	+32	100
4	Phoenix Coyotes	82	37	30	15	31	216	231	−15	89
5	Vancouver Canucks	82	36	35	11	31	196	223	−27	83
6	Calgary Flames	82	35	40	7	28	209	241	−32	77
7	Edmonton Oilers	82	29	44	9	25	203	270	−67	67

Source: National Hockey League
x – Clinched playoff spot; y – Clinched division

Western Conference Wild Card
Pos	Div	Team	GP	W	L	OTL	ROW	GF	GA	GD	Pts
1	CE	x – Minnesota Wild	82	43	27	12	35	207	206	+1	98
2	CE	x – Dallas Stars	82	40	31	11	36	235	228	+7	91
3	PA	Phoenix Coyotes	82	37	30	15	31	216	231	−15	89
4	CE	Nashville Predators	82	38	32	12	36	216	242	−26	88
5	CE	Winnipeg Jets	82	37	35	10	29	227	237	−10	84
6	PA	Vancouver Canucks	82	36	35	11	31	196	223	−27	83
7	PA	Calgary Flames	82	35	40	7	28	209	241	−32	77
8	PA	Edmonton Oilers	82	29	44	9	25	203	270	−67	67

Source: National Hockey League
x – Clinched playoff spot

== Schedule and results ==
=== Pre-season ===
2013 preseason game log: 5–2–1 (Home: 3–1–1; Road: 2–1–0)
#	Date	Visitor	Score	Home	OT	Decision	Attendance	Record	Recap
1	September 14	Calgary Flames	6–5	Edmonton Oilers	SO	Roy	16,564	0–0–1	Recap
2	September 14	Edmonton Oilers	3–2	Calgary Flames		Bachman	19,289	1–0–1	Recap
3	September 17	Edmonton Oilers	2–3	Winnipeg Jets		Bachman	15,004	1–1–1	Recap
4	September 18	Edmonton Oilers	4–1	Vancouver Canucks		Dubnyk	18,910	2–1–1	Recap
5	September 21	Vancouver Canucks	2–5	Edmonton Oilers		Rimmer	16,839	3–1–1	Recap
6	September 23	Winnipeg Jets	1–2	Edmonton Oilers		Dubnyk	15,794	4–1–1	Recap
7	September 24	New York Rangers	3–5	Edmonton Oilers		LaBarbera	16,008	5–1–1	Recap
8^{[a]}	September 27	Dallas Stars	4–0	Edmonton Oilers		Dubnyk	8,841	5–2–1	Recap
Notes:^{a} Game was played at Cox Convention Center in Oklahoma City, Oklahoma.

=== Regular season ===
2013–14 Game Log

October: 3–9–2 (Home: 1–3–1; Road: 2–6–1)
#	Date	Visitor	Score	Home	OT	Decision	Attendance	Record	Pts	Recap
1	October 1	Winnipeg	5–4	Edmonton		Dubnyk	16,839	0–1–0	0	Recap
2	October 5	Edmonton	2–6	Vancouver		Dubnyk	18,910	0–2–0	0	Recap
3	October 7	New Jersey	4–5	Edmonton	SO	LaBarbera	16,839	1–2–0	2	Recap
4	October 10	Montreal	4–1	Edmonton		Dubnyk	16,839	1–3–0	2	Recap
5	October 12	Edmonton	5–6	Toronto	OT	Dubnyk	19,379	1–3–1	3	Recap
6	October 14	Edmonton	2–4	Washington		LaBarbera	18,506	1–4–1	3	Recap
7	October 15	Edmonton	2–3	Pittsburgh		LaBarbera	18,410	1–5–1	3	Recap
8	October 17	Edmonton	2–3	NY Islanders		Dubnyk	10,608	1–6–1	3	Recap
9	October 19	Edmonton	3–1	Ottawa		Dubnyk	18,623	2–6–1	5	Recap
10	October 22	Edmonton	4–3	Montreal		Dubnyk	21,273	3–6–1	7	Recap
11	October 24	Washington	4–1	Edmonton		Dubnyk	16,839	3–7–1	7	Recap
12	October 26	Edmonton	4–5	Phoenix		LaBarbera	11,684	3–8–1	7	Recap
13	October 27	Edmonton	1–2	Los Angeles	SO	Bachman	18,118	3–8–2	8	Recap
14	October 29	Toronto Maple Leafs	4–0	Edmonton Oilers		Bachman	16,839	3–9–2	8	Recap

November: 5–8–0 (Home: 2–4–0; Road: 3–4–0)
#	Date	Visitor	Score	Home	OT	Decision	Attendance	Record	Pts	Recap
15	November 2	Detroit	5–0	Edmonton		Bachman	16,839	3–10–2	8	Recap
16	November 5	Edmonton	4–3	Florida	OT	Dubnyk	12,035	4–10–2	10	Recap
17	November 7	Edmonton	2–4	Tampa Bay		Dubnyk	18,695	4–11–2	10	Recap
18	November 9	Edmonton	2–4	Philadelphia		Dubnyk	19,725	4–12–2	10	Recap
19	November 10	Edmonton	4–5	Chicago		Dubnyk	21,185	4–13–2	10	Recap
20	November 13	Dallas	3–0	Edmonton		Dubnyk	16,839	4–14–2	10	Recap
21	November 15	San Jose	3–1	Edmonton		Dubnyk	16,839	4–15–2	10	Recap
22	November 16	Edmonton	4–2	Calgary		Dubnyk	19,289	5–15–2	12	Recap
23	November 19	Columbus	0–7	Edmonton		Dubnyk	16,839	6–15–2	14	Recap
24	November 21	Florida	1–4	Edmonton		Dubnyk	16,839	7–15–2	16	Recap
25	November 25	Chicago	5–1	Edmonton		Dubnyk	16,839	7–16–2	16	Recap
26	November 28	Edmonton	3–0	Nashville		Bryzgalov	16,279	8–16–2	18	Recap
27	November 29	Edmonton	2–4	Columbus		Bryzgalov	14,360	8–17–2	18	Recap

December: 4–7–3 (Home: 2–3–2; Road: 2–4–1)
#	Date	Visitor	Score	Home	OT	Decision	Attendance	Record	Pts	Recap
28	December 1	Edmonton	3–2	Dallas	SO	Dubnyk	12,673	9–17–2	20	Recap
29	December 3	Phoenix	6–2	Edmonton		Dubnyk	16,839	9–18–2	20	Recap
30	December 5	Colorado	2–8	Edmonton		Dubnyk	16,839	10–18–2	22	Recap
31	December 7	Calgary	2–1	Edmonton	OT	Dubnyk	16,839	10–18–3	23	Recap
32	December 10	Carolina	4–5	Edmonton	OT	Dubnyk	16,839	11–18–3	25	Recap
33	December 12	Boston	4–2	Edmonton		Dubnyk	16,839	11–19–3	25	Recap
34	December 13	Edmonton	0–4	Vancouver		Dubnyk	18,910	11–20–3	25	Recap
35	December 15	Edmonton	2–3	Anaheim		Bryzgalov	16,301	11–21–3	25	Recap
36	December 17	Edmonton	0–3	Los Angeles		Bryzgalov	18,118	11–22–3	25	Recap
37	December 19	Edmonton	2–4	Colorado		Dubnyk	13,135	11–23–3	25	Recap
38	December 21	St. Louis	6–0	Edmonton		Bryzgalov	16,839	11–24–3	25	Recap
39	December 23	Winnipeg	2–6	Edmonton		Bryzgalov	16,839	12–24–3	27	Recap
40	December 27	Edmonton	2–0	Calgary		Dubnyk	19,289	13–24–3	29	Recap
41	December 28	Philadelphia	4–3	Edmonton	SO	Bryzgalov	16,839	13–24–4	30	Recap
42	December 31	Edmonton	3–4	Phoenix	OT	Bryzgalov	17,416	13–24–5	31	Recap

January: 4–8–1 (Home: 3–3–0; Road: 1–4–1)
#	Date	Visitor	Score	Home	OT	Decision	Attendance	Record	Pts	Recap
43	January 2	Edmonton	1–5	San Jose		Dubnyk	17,562	13–25–5	31	Recap
44	January 3	Edmonton	2–5	Anaheim		Bryzgalov	17,174	13–26–5	31	Recap
45	January 5	Tampa Bay	3–5	Edmonton		Bryzgalov	16,839	14–26–5	33	Recap
46	January 7	St. Louis	5–2	Edmonton		Bryzgalov	16,839	14–27–5	33	Recap
47	January 10	Pittsburgh	3–4	Edmonton	OT	Dubnyk	16,839	15–27–5	35	Recap
48	January 12	Edmonton	3–5	Chicago		Dubnyk	21,424	15–28–5	35	Recap
49	January 14	Edmonton	2–5	Dallas		Bryzgalov	12,823	15–29–5	35	Recap
50	January 16	Edmonton	1–4	Minnesota		Scrivens	18,037	15–30–5	35	Recap
51	January 18	Edmonton	2–3	Winnipeg	OT	Bryzgalov	15,004	15–30–6	36	Recap
52	January 21	Vancouver	2–1	Edmonton		Scrivens	16,839	15–31–6	36	Recap
53	January 24	Phoenix	4–3	Edmonton		Bryzgalov	16,839	15–32–6	36	Recap
54	January 26	Nashville	1–5	Edmonton		Scrivens	16,839	16–32–6	38	Recap
55	January 27	Edmonton	4–2	Vancouver		Bryzgalov	18,910	17–32–6	40	Recap
56	January 29	San Jose	0–3	Edmonton		Scrivens	16,839	18–32–6	42	Recap

February: 2–2–1 (Home: 0–1–0; Road: 2–1–1)
#	Date	Visitor	Score	Home	OT	Decision	Attendance	Record	Pts	Recap
57	February 1	Edmonton	0–4	Boston		Scrivens	17,565	18–33–6	42	Recap
58	February 3	Edmonton	3–2	Buffalo		Bryzgalov	18,531	19–33–6	44	Recap
59	February 6	Edmonton	2–1	NY Rangers		Scrivens	18,006	20–33–6	46	Recap
60	February 7	Edmonton	1–2	New Jersey	OT	Bryzgalov	16,592	20–33–7	47	Recap
61	February 27	Minnesota	3–0	Edmonton		Scrivens	16,839	20–34–7	47	Recap

March: 6–6–2 (Home: 4–4–1; Road: 2–2–1)
#	Date	Visitor	Score	Home	OT	Decision	Attendance	Record	Pts	Recap
62	March 1	Calgary	2–1	Edmonton	OT	Bryzgalov	16,839	20–34–8	48	Recap
63	March 4	Ottawa	2–3	Edmonton		Scrivens	16,839	21–34–8	50	Recap
64	March 6	NY Islanders	2–3	Edmonton	OT	Scrivens	16,839	22–34–8	52	Recap
65	March 9	Los Angeles	4–2	Edmonton		Scrivens	16,839	22–35–8	52	Recap
66	March 11	Edmonton	4–3	Minnesota	SO	Fasth	18,650	23–35–8	54	Recap
67	March 13	Edmonton	2–6	St. Louis		Scrivens	18,084	23–36–8	54	Recap
68	March 14	Edmonton	1–2	Detroit	SO	Fasth	20,066	23–36–9	55	Recap
69	March 16	Edmonton	2–1	Carolina		Scrivens	16,588	24–36–9	57	Recap
70	March 18	Nashville	1–5	Edmonton		Fasth	16,839	25–36–9	59	Recap
71	March 20	Buffalo	3–1	Edmonton		Scrivens	16,839	25–37–9	59	Recap
72	March 22	Calgary	8–1	Edmonton		Fasth	16,839	25–38–9	59	Recap
73	March 25	San Jose	5–2	Edmonton		Scrivens	16,839	25–39–9	59	Recap
74	March 28	Anaheim	3–4	Edmonton	OT	Scrivens	16,839	26–39–9	61	Recap
75	March 30	NY Rangers	5–0	Edmonton		Scrivens	16,839	26–40–9	61	Recap

April: 3–4–0 (Home: 2–2–0; Road: 1–2–0)
#	Date	Visitor	Score	Home	OT	Decision	Attendance	Record	Pts	Recap
76	April 1	Edmonton	4–5	San Jose		Scrivens	17,562	26–41–9	61	Recap
77	April 2	Edmonton	2–3	Anaheim		Fasth	17,174	26–42–9	61	Recap
78	April 4	Edmonton	3–2	Phoenix	SO	Scrivens	14,732	27–42–9	63	Recap
79	April 6	Anaheim	2–4	Edmonton		Fasth	16,839	28–42–9	65	Recap
80	April 8	Colorado	4–1	Edmonton		Scrivens	16,839	28–43–9	65	Recap
81	April 10	Los Angeles	3–0	Edmonton		Fasth	16,839	28–44–9	65	Recap
82	April 12	Vancouver	2–5	Edmonton		Scrivens	16,839	29–44–9	67	Recap

Legend: Win (2 points) Loss (0 points) Overtime/shootout loss (1 point)

== Player statistics ==
Final Stats

Skaters

Regular season
Player	GP	G	A	Pts	+/-	PIM
Taylor Hall	75	27	53	80	−15	44
Jordan Eberle	80	28	37	65	−11	18
David Perron	78	28	29	57	−16	90
Ryan Nugent-Hopkins	80	19	37	56	−12	26
Sam Gagner	67	10	27	37	−29	41
Justin Schultz	74	11	22	33	−22	16
Ales Hemsky^{‡}	55	9	17	26	−13	20
Nail Yakupov	63	11	13	24	−33	36
Ryan Smyth	72	10	13	23	−18	44
Boyd Gordon	74	8	13	21	−15	20
Mark Arcobello	41	4	14	18	−7	8
Andrew Ference	71	3	15	18	−18	63
Jeff Petry	80	7	10	17	−22	42
Philip Larsen	30	3	9	12	−4	8
Anton Belov	57	1	6	7	−12	34
Ryan Jones	52	2	4	6	0	40
Martin Marincin	44	0	6	6	−2	16
Will Acton	30	3	2	5	−2	21
Jesse Joensuu	42	3	2	5	−16	16
Corey Potter^{‡}	16	0	5	5	0	21
Luke Gazdic	67	2	2	4	−8	127
Nick Schultz^{‡}	60	0	4	4	−11	24
Matt Hendricks^{†}	33	3	0	3	−6	58
Oscar Klefbom	17	1	2	3	−6	0
Taylor Fedun	4	2	0	2	−1	0
Ladislav Smid^{‡}	17	1	1	2	−6	16
Steven Pinizzotto	6	0	2	2	−1	15
Mark Fraser^{†}	23	1	0	1	−7	43
Tyler Pitlick	10	1	0	1	−2	0
Roman Horak^{†}	2	1	0	1	−1	0
Denis Grebeshkov	7	0	1	1	0	2
Ben Eager	7	0	1	1	1	2
Anton Lander	27	0	1	1	−10	4
Ryan Hamilton	2	0	0	0	−2	0
Brad Hunt	3	0	0	0	−3	0
Mike Brown^{‡}	8	0	0	0	1	19
Linus Omark^{‡}	1	0	0	0	−1	0

Goaltenders

Regular season
Player	GP	GS	TOI	W	L	OT	GA	GAA	SA	SV%	SO	G	A	PIM
Devan Dubnyk^{‡}	32	29	1,677:40	11	17	2	94	3.36	885	.894	2	0	0	6
Ilya Bryzgalov^{‡}	20	19	1,135:14	5	8	5	57	3.01	622	.908	1	0	0	0
Ben Scrivens^{†}	21	20	1,234:53	9	11	0	62	3.01	741	.916	1	0	0	6
Viktor Fasth^{†}	7	7	396:04	3	3	1	18	2.73	209	.914	0	0	0	0
Jason LaBarbera^{‡}	7	4	348:19	1	3	0	19	3.28	146	.870	0	0	0	0
Richard Bachman	3	3	138:43	0	2	1	7	3.02	83	.916	0	0	0	0

^{†}Denotes player spent time with another team before joining the Oilers. Stats reflect time with the Oilers only.
^{‡}Traded mid-season. Stats reflect time with the Oilers only.
Bold/italics denotes franchise record

== Awards ==
Regular season
Player	Award	Date
Andrew Ference	King Clancy Memorial Trophy	June 24, 2014

== Milestones ==
Regular season
Player	Milestone	Reached
Will Acton	1st NHL Game; 1st NHL Assist; 1st NHL Point	October 1, 2013
Mark Arcobello	1st NHL Assist; 1st NHL Point	October 1, 2013
Anton Belov	1st NHL Game	October 1, 2013
Luke Gazdic	1st NHL Game; 1st NHL Goal; 1st NHL Point	October 1, 2013
Ryan Smyth	1,200th NHL Game	October 5, 2013
Ales Hemsky	600th NHL Game	October 7, 2013
David Perron	200th NHL Point	October 7, 2013
Anton Belov	1st NHL Assist; 1st NHL Point	October 12, 2013
Jordan Eberle	200th NHL Game	October 12, 2013
Will Acton	1st NHL Goal	October 14, 2013
Taylor Hall	100th NHL PIM	October 19, 2013
Tyler Pitlick	1st NHL Game	October 22, 2013
Luke Gazdic	1st NHL Assist	October 26, 2013
Tyler Pitlick	1st NHL Goal; 1st NHL Point	October 26, 2013
Boyd Gordon	500th NHL Game	October 29, 2013
Mark Arcobello	1st NHL Goal	November 5, 2013
Taylor Fedun	1st NHL Game; 1st NHL Goal; 1st NHL Point	November 5, 2013
Philip Larsen	100th NHL Game	November 10, 2013
Jordan Eberle	100th NHL Assist	November 19, 2013
Taylor Hall	4th NHL Hat-trick	December 5, 2013
Martin Marincin	1st NHL Game	December 5, 2013
Ryan Jones	300th NHL Game	December 7, 2013
Ryan Nugent-Hopkins	100th NHL Point	December 10, 2013
Taylor Hall	200th NHL Game	December 17, 2013
Andrew Ference	800th NHL Game	December 27, 2013
Andrew Ference	200th NHL Point	December 28, 2013
Taylor Hall	100th NHL Assist	December 28, 2013
David Perron	100th NHL Goal	December 28, 2013
Brad Hunt	1st NHL Game	January 3, 2014
Jeff Petry	200th NHL Game	January 7, 2014
Anton Belov	1st NHL Goal	January 10, 2014
Ryan Jones	100th NHL Point	January 24, 2014
Martin Marincin	1st NHL Assist; 1st NHL Point	January 24, 2014
David Perron	2nd NHL Hat-trick	January 27, 2014
Jordan Eberle	200th NHL Point	January 29, 2014
Jesse Joensuu	100th NHL Game	January 29, 2014
Nail Yakupov	100th NHL Game	February 1, 2014
Ales Hemsky	300th NHL PIM	February 3, 2014
Taylor Hall	200th NHL Point	February 6, 2014
Justin Schultz	100th NHL Game	February 7, 2014
David Perron	400th NHL Game	March 6, 2014
Oscar Klefbom	1st NHL Game; 1st NHL Assist; 1st NHL Point	March 11, 2014
Luke Gazdic	100th NHL PIM	March 13, 2014
Andrew Ference	700th NHL PIM	March 14, 2014
David Perron	300th NHL PIM	March 16, 2014
Jeff Petry	100th NHL PIM	March 18, 2014
Sam Gagner	100th NHL Goal	March 28, 2014
Oscar Klefbom	1st NHL Goal	March 28, 2014
Steve Pinizzotto	1st NHL Assist; 1st NHL Point	April 12, 2014

== Transactions ==
The Oilers have been involved in the following transactions during the 2013–14 season.

=== Trades ===
Date	Details
June 30, 2013	To Los Angeles Kings 2nd-round pick (37th overall) in 2013	To Edmonton Oilers 2nd-round pick (57th overall) in 2013; 3rd-round pick in 2013; 4th-round pick in 2013
June 30, 2013	To St. Louis Blues 2nd-round pick in 2013	To Edmonton Oilers 3rd-round pick in 2013; 4th-round pick in 2013; 4th-round pick in 2013
July 5, 2013	To Dallas Stars Shawn Horcoff	To Edmonton Oilers Philip Larsen; 7th-round pick in 2016
July 6, 2013	To San Jose Sharks Kyle Bigos	To Edmonton Oilers Lee Moffie
July 10, 2013	To St. Louis Blues Magnus Paajarvi; 2nd-round pick in 2014; 4th-round pick in 2015	To Edmonton Oilers David Perron; 3rd-round pick in 2015
October 21, 2013	To San Jose Sharks Mike Brown	To Edmonton Oilers 4th-round pick in 2014
November 8, 2013	To Calgary Flames Ladislav Smid; Olivier Roy	To Edmonton Oilers Roman Horak; Laurent Brossoit
December 14, 2013	To Chicago Blackhawks Jason LaBarbera	To Edmonton Oilers Future considerations
December 19, 2013	To Buffalo Sabres Linus Omark	To Edmonton Oilers Conditional 6th-round pick in 2014
January 15, 2014	To Nashville Predators Devan Dubnyk	To Edmonton Oilers Matt Hendricks
January 15, 2014	To Los Angeles Kings 3rd-round pick in 2014	To Edmonton Oilers Ben Scrivens
January 17, 2014	To Florida Panthers Ryan Martindale	To Edmonton Oilers Steve Pinizzotto
January 31, 2014	To Toronto Maple Leafs Teemu Hartikainen; Cameron Abney	To Edmonton Oilers Mark Fraser
March 4, 2014	To Minnesota Wild Ilya Bryzgalov	To Edmonton Oilers 4th-round pick in 2014
March 4, 2014	To Anaheim Ducks 5th-round pick in 2014; 3rd-round pick in 2015	To Edmonton Oilers Viktor Fasth
March 5, 2014	To Ottawa Senators Ales Hemsky	To Edmonton Oilers 5th-round pick in 2014; 3rd-round pick in 2015
March 5, 2014	To Columbus Blue Jackets Nick Schultz	To Edmonton Oilers 5th-round pick in 2014
June 25, 2014	To Columbus Blue Jackets 5th-round pick in 2014	To Edmonton Oilers Nikita Nikitin

=== Free agents signed ===
Date	Player	Former team	Term
July 5, 2013	Will Acton	Toronto Marlies	2 years, $1.36 million entry-level contract
July 5, 2013	Andrew Ference	Boston Bruins	4 years, $13 million
July 5, 2013	Boyd Gordon	Phoenix Coyotes	3 years, $9 million
July 5, 2013	Ryan Hamilton	Toronto Maple Leafs	2 years, $1.2 million
July 5, 2013	Jesse Joensuu	New York Islanders	2 years, $1.9 million
July 5, 2013	Jason LaBarbera	Phoenix Coyotes	1 year, $1 million
July 6, 2013	Richard Bachman	Dallas Stars	1 year, $625,000
July 6, 2013	Brad Hunt	Chicago Wolves	2 years, $1.1 million entry-level contract
July 19, 2013	Denis Grebeshkov	HC Yugra	1 year, $1.5 million
November 17, 2013	Ilya Bryzgalov	Philadelphia Flyers	1 year, $2.0 million
March 31, 2014	Jordan Oesterle	Western Michigan University	2 years, $1.535 million entry-level contract
June 16, 2014	Iiro Pakarinen	HIFK	2 years, $1.635 million entry-level contract

=== Free agents lost ===
Date	Player	New team	Term
June 12, 2013	Garrett Stafford	Farjestad BK	undisclosed
July 5, 2013	Yann Danis	Philadelphia Flyers	1 year, $625,000
July 5, 2013	Nikolai Khabibulin	Chicago Blackhawks	1 year, $2 million
July 9, 2013	Theo Peckham	Chicago Blackhawks	1 year, $575,000
July 15, 2013	Eric Belanger	Avtomobilist Yekaterinburg	1 year
July 18, 2013	Alex Plante	Dornbirner EC	undisclosed
July 29, 2013	Bryan Rodney	Nashville Predators	
August 7, 2013	Philippe Cornet	San Antonio Rampage	undisclosed
August 14, 2013	Lennart Petrell	Genève-Servette HC	1 year
August 20, 2013	Mark Fistric	Anaheim Ducks	1 year, $900,000
September 29, 2013	Colten Teubert	Iserlohn Roosters	
September 29, 2013	Ryan Whitney	Florida Panthers	1 year, $900,000
November 6, 2013	Jerred Smithson	Toronto Maple Leafs	
December 12, 2013	Chris VandeVelde	Philadelphia Flyers	1 year
April 3, 2014	Kellen Jones	Oklahoma City Barons	
April 16, 2014	Anton Belov	SKA Saint Petersburg	
May 12, 2014	Roman Horak	Vityaz Podolsk	

=== Claimed via waivers ===
Player	Former team	Date claimed off waivers
Steve MacIntyre	Pittsburgh Penguins	September 23, 2013
Luke Gazdic	Dallas Stars	September 29, 2013

=== Lost via waivers ===
Player	New team	Date claimed off waivers
Corey Potter	Boston Bruins	March 5, 2014

=== Player signings ===
Player	Date	Contract terms
Ryan Jones	July 6, 2013	1 year, $1.5 million
Taylor Fedun	July 19, 2013	1 year, $675,000
Sam Gagner	July 22, 2013	3 years, $14.4 million
Darnell Nurse	July 25, 2013	3 years, $2.775 million entry-level contract
Jujhar Khaira	August 7, 2013	3 years, $2.7175 million entry-level contract
Linus Omark	August 27, 2013	1 year, $600,000
Ryan Nugent-Hopkins	September 19, 2013	7 years, $42 million contract extension
Mitchell Moroz	December 28, 2013	3 years, $2.7175 million entry-level contract
Ben Scrivens	March 3, 2014	2 years, $4.6 million contract extension
Mark Arcobello	March 31, 2014	1 year, $600,000 contract extension
Dillon Simpson	April 22, 2014	3 years, $2.51 million entry-level contract
Bogdan Yakimov	May 8, 2014	3 years, $2.5275 million entry-level contract
Anton Lander	May 12, 2014	1 year, $600,000 contract extension
Steve Pinizzotto	June 12, 2014	1 year, $650,000
Nikita Nikitin	June 25, 2014	2 years, $9 million

== Draft picks ==
Edmonton Oilers' picks at the 2013 NHL entry draft, to be held in Newark, New Jersey on June 30, 2013.

Round	#	Player	Pos	Nationality	College/Junior/Club team (League)
1	7	Darnell Nurse	(D)	Canada	Sault Ste. Marie Greyhounds (OHL)
2	56	Marc-Olivier Roy	(C)	Canada	Blainville-Boisbriand Armada (QMJHL)
3	83	Bogdan Yakimov	(C)	Russia	Reaktor (MHL)
3	88	Anton Slepyshev	(LW)	Russia	Salavat Yulaev Ufa (KHL)
4	94	Jackson Houck	(RW)	Canada	Vancouver Giants (WHL)
4	96	Kyle Platzer	(C)	Canada	London Knights (OHL)
4	113	Aidan Muir	(W)	Canada	Victory Honda (MWEHL)
5	128	Evan Campbell	(LW)	Canada	Langley Rivermen (BCHL)
6	158	Ben Betker	(D)	Canada	Everett Silvertips (WHL)
7	188	Gregory Chase	(C/RW)	Canada	Calgary Hitmen (WHL)

Draft notes

- The Edmonton Oilers' second-round pick went to the Los Angeles Kings as the result of a trade on June 30, 2013, that sent a second and third-round pick in 2013 (57th and 88th overall) and Carolina's fourth-round pick in 2013 (96th overall) to Edmonton in exchange for this pick.
- The Anaheim Ducks' second-round pick went to the Edmonton Oilers as a result of a July 12, 2011, trade that sent Andrew Cogliano to the Ducks in exchange for this pick.
- The Los Angeles Kings' second-round pick went to the St. Louis Blues as the result of a trade on June 30, 2013, that sent Tampa Bay's fourth-round pick in 2013 (94th overall) and St. Louis' third and fourth-round picks in 2013 (83rd and 113th overall) to Edmonton in exchange for this pick. Edmonton previously acquired this pick as the result of a trade on June 30, 2013, that sent a second-round pick in 2013 (37th overall) to Los Angeles in exchange for a third-round pick in 2013 (88th overall), Carolina's fourth-round pick in 2013 (96th overall) and this pick.
- The Edmonton Oilers' third-round pick went to the Dallas Stars as the result of a January 14, 2013, trade that sent Mark Fistric to the Oilers in exchange for this pick.
- The St. Louis Blues' third-round pick went to the Edmonton Oilers as the result of a trade on June 30, 2013, that sent Los Angeles' second-round pick in 2013 (57th overall) to St. Louis in exchange for Tampa Bay's fourth-round pick in 2013 (94th overall), a fourth-round pick in 2013 (113th overall) and this pick.
- The Los Angeles Kings' third-round pick went to the Edmonton Oilers as the result of a trade on June 30, 2013, that sent a second-round pick in 2013 (37th overall) to Los Angeles in exchange for a second-round pick in 2013 (57th overall), Carolina's fourth-round pick in 2013 (96th overall) and this pick.
- The Tampa Bay Lightning's fourth-round pick went to the Edmonton Oilers (via St. Louis), the Blues traded the pick to Edmonton as the result of a trade on June 30, 2013, that sent Los Angeles' second-round pick in 2013 (57th overall) to St. Louis in exchange for a third and fourth-round pick in 2013 (83rd and 113th overall) and this pick.
- The Edmonton Oilers' fourth-round pick went to the Florida Panthers as the result of an April 3, 2013, trade that sent Jerred Smithson to the Oilers in exchange for this pick.
- The St. Louis Blues' fourth-round pick went to the Edmonton Oilers as the result of a trade on June 30, 2013, that sent Los Angeles' second-round pick in 2013 (57th overall) to St. Louis in exchange for a third-round pick in 2013 (83rd overall), Tampa Bay's fourth-round pick in 2013 (94th overall) and this pick.
