= 2013–14 Buffalo Sabres season =

NHL hockey team season

2013–14 Buffalo Sabres
- Division: 8th Atlantic
- Conference: 16th Eastern
- 2013–14 record: 21–51–10
- Home record: 13–21–7
- Road record: 8–30–3
- Goals for: 157
- Goals against: 248

Team information
- General manager: Darcy Regier (Oct. 2 – Nov. 13); Tim Murray (Jan. 9 – Apr. 13)
- Coach: Ron Rolston (Oct. 2 – Nov. 13); Ted Nolan (interim, Nov. 13 – Apr. 13)
- Captain: Thomas Vanek (Oct. 2–27); Steve Ott (Oct. 2 – Feb. 28); Vacant (Feb. 28 – Apr. 13)
- Alternate captains: Christian Ehrhoff; Henrik Tallinder; Drew Stafford (Mar.–Apr.)
- Arena: First Niagara Center
- Average attendance: 18,543 (95.8%) (37 games)
- Minor league affiliate: Rochester Americans (AHL)

Team leaders
- Goals: Tyler Ennis (21)
- Assists: Christian Ehrhoff (27)
- Points: Cody Hodgson (43)
- Penalty minutes: John Scott (96)
- Plus/minus: Luke Adam; Johan Larsson; Torrey Mitchell (0)
- Wins: Ryan Miller (15)
- Goals against average: Michal Neuvirth (2.56)

The 2013–14 Buffalo Sabres season was the 44th season for the National Hockey League (NHL) franchise that was established on May 22, 1970. The Sabres moved to the realigned Atlantic Division, which included the previous season's Northeast Division with the addition of the Tampa Bay Lightning, Florida Panthers and Detroit Red Wings. Ron Rolston, who started the season as head coach, was fired after 20 games and replaced by Ted Nolan, who had previously coached the team from 1995 to 1997. In terms of point percentage, this is the worst season in Sabres franchise history, and the third worst in the salary cap era behind the 2016–2017 Colorado Avalanche and the 2019–2020 Detroit Red Wings.

== Off-season ==
Ron Rolston was made the permanent head coach when Darcy Regier removed the interim tag from his title. Regier did not interview any other candidates for the position. Rolston replaced Lindy Ruff who was fired the season before after serving as head coach for nearly 16 seasons.

=== Training camp ===
The Sabres' training camp saw the arrival of many highly touted prospects into the Sabres' lineup. Newly acquired first round picks Rasmus Ristolainen and Nikita Zadorov both made the opening day roster along with 2012 first round picks Mikhail Grigorenko, Zemgus Girgensons and 2011 first round pick Joel Armia. Armia and Zadorov were both injured in the pre-season and would not play right away.

The pre-season saw the Sabres involved in a controversial game. In a road game at the Toronto Maple Leafs, a fight between Corey Tropp and Toronto winger Jamie Devane ended with Tropp injured. On the ensuing faceoff, Sabres' enforcer John Scott lined up opposite to Phil Kessel and attempted to engage him in a fight. A line brawl followed in which 209 minutes in penalties were handed out, including 11 fighting majors and 14 ten-minute misconduct penalties. During the fight, Maple Leaf David Clarkson would leave the bench to fight. Clarkson would later be suspended by the NHL for ten regular season games. Phil Kessel received a three-game pre-season game ban for slashing Scott with the intent to injure. Sabres Head Coach Ron Rolston was fined an undisclosed amount for "player selection." The fine was controversial due to the fact that Scott was on the ice the previous shift and the Leafs, being the home team, had last change. Corey Tropp suffered a broken jaw and concussion in the fight.

The day before the start of the regular season, Rolston named the new team captain. With the trade of team captain Jason Pominville the year before, the captaincy had remained vacant. Rolston used a rotating captaincy in the preseason. Steve Ott and Thomas Vanek were named co-captains for the 2013–14 season. Ott would wear the "C" for all road games and Vanek would wear it at home. Christian Ehrhoff would wear an "A" during all games.

== Regular season ==
Opening the season with a lineup that featured Zemgus Girgensons, Mikhail Grigorenko, Rasmus Ristolainen and Nikita Zadorov, the 2013–14 Sabres were the first team since the 1995–96 season to include four teenagers.

On November 13, 2013, general manager Darcy Regier and Head Coach Ron Rolston were relieved of their duties. Former Sabre Pat LaFontaine was hired as President of Hockey Operations (a position that had been left vacant since the departure of Larry Quinn in 2011) and Ted Nolan was hired as the interim head coach. After hiring Ottawa Senators' Assistant general manager Tim Murray to the vacant general manager position on January 9, Pat LaFontaine resigned as President of Hockey Operations on March 1, 2014, to return to his previous position with the NHL.

The Sabres made numerous trades leading up to and right before the March 5 trading deadline. On February 28, they traded away veterans Ryan Miller and Steve Ott to the St. Louis Blues. Then on March 5, the NHL trade deadline day, they made three separate trades with the Minnesota Wild, Washington Capitals and Los Angeles Kings.

The Sabres failed to qualify for the playoffs for the third straight year.

== Standings ==
Atlantic Division
Pos	Team	GP	W	L	OTL	ROW	GF	GA	GD	Pts
1	p – Boston Bruins	82	54	19	9	51	261	177	+84	117
2	x – Tampa Bay Lightning	82	46	27	9	38	240	215	+25	101
3	x – Montreal Canadiens	82	46	28	8	40	215	204	+11	100
4	x – Detroit Red Wings	82	39	28	15	34	222	230	−8	93
5	Ottawa Senators	82	37	31	14	30	236	265	−29	88
6	Toronto Maple Leafs	82	38	36	8	29	231	256	−25	84
7	Florida Panthers	82	29	45	8	21	196	268	−72	66
8	Buffalo Sabres	82	21	51	10	14	157	248	−91	52

Source: National Hockey League
p – Clinched Presidents' Trophy; x – Clinched playoff spot

Eastern Conference Wild Card
Pos	Div	Team	GP	W	L	OTL	ROW	GF	GA	GD	Pts
1	ME	x – Columbus Blue Jackets	82	43	32	7	38	231	216	+15	93
2	AT	x – Detroit Red Wings	82	39	28	15	34	222	230	−8	93
3	ME	Washington Capitals	82	38	30	14	28	235	240	−5	90
4	ME	New Jersey Devils	82	35	29	18	35	197	208	−11	88
5	AT	Ottawa Senators	82	37	31	14	30	236	265	−29	88
6	AT	Toronto Maple Leafs	82	38	36	8	29	231	256	−25	84
7	ME	Carolina Hurricanes	82	36	35	11	34	207	230	−23	83
8	ME	New York Islanders	82	34	37	11	25	225	267	−42	79
9	AT	Florida Panthers	82	29	45	8	21	196	268	−72	66
10	AT	Buffalo Sabres	82	21	51	10	14	157	248	−91	52

Source: National Hockey League
x – Clinched playoff spot

== Schedule and results ==
=== Pre-season ===
2013 preseason game log: 4–2–1 (Home: 2–0–1; Road: 2–2–0)
#	Date	Visitor	Score	Home	OT	Decision	Attendance	Record	Recap
1	September 15	Buffalo	5–4	Montreal	SO	Hackett	21,273	1–0–0	Recap
2	September 17	Buffalo	3–1	Columbus		Hackett	9,009	2–0–0	Recap
3	September 19	Carolina	2–5	Buffalo		Miller	17,626	3–0–0	Recap
4	September 21	Toronto	3–2	Buffalo	SO	Enroth	19,070	3–0–1	Recap
5	September 22	Buffalo	3–5	Toronto		Miller	19,001	3–1–1	Recap
6	September 25	Columbus	0–3	Buffalo		Enroth	17,346	4–1–1	Recap
7	September 27	Buffalo	0–1	Carolina		Miller	12,033	4–2–1	Recap

=== Regular season ===
2013–14 game log
Overall: 21–51–10 (Home: 13–21–7; Road: 8–30–3)

October: 2–12–1 (Home: 0–7–1; Road: 2–5–0)
#	Date	Visitor	Score	Home	OT	Decision	Attendance	Record	Pts	Recap
1	October 2	Buffalo	1–2	Detroit		Miller	20,066	0–1–0	0	Recap
2	October 4	Ottawa	1–0	Buffalo		Miller	19,070	0–2–0	0	Recap
3	October 5	Buffalo	1–4	Pittsburgh		Enroth	18,641	0–3–0	0	Recap
4	October 8	Tampa Bay	3–2	Buffalo	OT	Enroth	18,243	0–3–1	1	Recap
5	October 10	Columbus	4–1	Buffalo		Miller	18,210	0–4–1	1	Recap
6	October 12	Buffalo	1–2	Chicago		Miller	21,261	0–5–1	1	Recap
7	October 14	Minnesota	2–1	Buffalo		Enroth	18,111	0–6–1	1	Recap
8	October 15	Buffalo	4–3	NY Islanders	SO	Miller	10,512	1–6–1	3	Recap
9	October 17	Vancouver	3–0	Buffalo		Miller	18,374	1–7–1	3	Recap
10	October 19	Colorado	4–2	Buffalo		Miller	18,422	1–8–1	3	Recap
11	October 23	Boston	5–2	Buffalo		Miller	17,645	1–9–1	3	Recap
12	October 25	Buffalo	3–1	Florida		Enroth	12,984	2–9–1	5	Recap
13	October 26	Buffalo	2–3	Tampa Bay		Miller	18,088	2–10–1	5	Recap
14	October 28	Dallas	4–3	Buffalo		Miller	18,295	2–11–1	5	Recap
15	October 31	Buffalo	0–2	NY Rangers		Miller	18,006	2–12–1	5	Recap

November: 4–8–1 (Home: 3–4–0; Road: 1–4–1)
#	Date	Visitor	Score	Home	OT	Decision	Attendance	Record	Pts	Recap
16	November 2	Anaheim	6–3	Buffalo		Enroth	19,070	2–13–1	5	Recap
17	November 5	Buffalo	5–4	San Jose	SO	Miller	17,562	3–13–1	7	Recap
18	November 7	Buffalo	0–2	Los Angeles		Enroth	18,118	3–14–1	7	Recap
19	November 8	Buffalo	2–6	Anaheim		Miller	15,577	3–15–1	7	Recap
20	November 12	Los Angeles	2–3	Buffalo	SO	Miller	18,281	4–15–1	9	Recap
21	November 15	Toronto	1–3	Buffalo		Miller	19,070	5–15–1	11	Recap
22	November 16	Buffalo	2–4	Toronto		Enroth	19,447	5–16–1	11	Recap
23	November 19	St. Louis	4–1	Buffalo		Miller	17,710	5–17–1	11	Recap
24	November 21	Buffalo	1–4	Philadelphia		Miller	19,973	5–18–1	11	Recap
25	November 24	Detroit	3–1	Buffalo		Miller	18,721	5–19–1	11	Recap
26	November 27	Montreal	3–1	Buffalo		Miller	18,497	5–20–1	11	Recap
27	November 29	Toronto	2–3	Buffalo	OT	Miller	19,070	6–20–1	13	Recap
28	November 30	Buffalo	0–1	New Jersey	OT	Enroth	15,226	6–20–2	14	Recap

December: 5–5–2 (Home: 5–1–1; Road: 0–4–1)
#	Date	Visitor	Score	Home	OT	Decision	Attendance	Record	Pts	Recap
29	December 5	NY Rangers	3–1	Buffalo		Miller	18,088	6–21–2	14	Recap
30	December 7	Buffalo	2–3	Montreal		Enroth	21,273	6–22–2	14	Recap
31	December 10	Ottawa	1–2	Buffalo	SO	Miller	18,594	7–22–2	16	Recap
32	December 12	Buffalo	1–2	Ottawa		Miller	15,578	7–23–2	16	Recap
33	December 14	Calgary	2–1	Buffalo	OT	Enroth	18,368	7–23–3	17	Recap
34	December 17	Winnipeg	2–4	Buffalo		Miller	17,795	8–23–3	19	Recap
35	December 19	Boston	2–4	Buffalo		Miller	18,217	9–23–3	21	Recap
36	December 21	Buffalo	1–4	Boston		Enroth	17,565	9–24–3	21	Recap
37	December 23	Phoenix	1–2	Buffalo	OT	Miller	18,942	10–24–3	23	Recap
38	December 27	Buffalo	3–4	Toronto	SO	Miller	19,405	10–24–4	24	Recap
39	December 29	Washington	1–2	Buffalo	SO	Miller	19,070	11–24–4	26	Recap
40	December 31	Buffalo	0–3	Winnipeg		Enroth	15,004	11–25–4	26	Recap

January: 4–5–4 (Home: 1–3–3; Road: 3–2–1)
#	Date	Visitor	Score	Home	OT	Decision	Attendance	Record	Pts	Recap
41	January 2	Buffalo	1–4	Minnesota		Miller	18,229	11–26–4	26	Recap
42	January 4	New Jersey	1–2	Buffalo		Miller	19,070	12–26–4	28	Recap
–	January 7	Carolina		Buffalo	Game rescheduled to February 25 due to hazardous weather in Buffalo.
43	January 9	Florida	2–1	Buffalo	SO	Enroth	17,872	12–26–5	29	Recap
44	January 12	Buffalo	2–1	Washington	SO	Miller	18,506	13–26–5	31	Recap
45	January 14	Philadelphia	4–3	Buffalo		Enroth	18,667	13–27–5	31	Recap
46	January 15	Buffalo	3–4	Toronto	SO	Miller	19,372	13–27–6	32	Recap
47	January 18	Columbus	4–3	Buffalo	SO	Miller	19,070	13–27–7	33	Recap
48	January 21	Florida	4–3	Buffalo		Miller	17,583	13–28–7	33	Recap
49	January 23	Carolina	5–3	Buffalo		Enroth	18,468	13–29–7	33	Recap
50	January 25	Buffalo	5–2	Columbus		Miller	16,272	14–29–7	35	Recap
51	January 27	Buffalo	0–3	Pittsburgh		Miller	18,563	14–30–7	35	Recap
52	January 28	Washington	5–4	Buffalo	OT	Enroth	18,923	14–30–8	36	Recap
53	January 30	Buffalo	3–2	Phoenix		Miller	13,000	15–30–8	38	Recap

February: 3–4–0 (Home: 3–2–0; Road: 0–2–0)
#	Date	Visitor	Score	Home	OT	Decision	Attendance	Record	Pts	Recap
54	February 1	Buffalo	1–7	Colorado		Miller	16,649	15–31–8	38	Recap
55	February 3	Edmonton	3–2	Buffalo		Enroth	18,531	15–32–8	38	Recap
56	February 5	Pittsburgh	5–1	Buffalo		Miller	18,408	15–33–8	38	Recap
57	February 6	Buffalo	2–3	Ottawa		Enroth	18,426	15–34–8	38	Recap
58	February 25	Carolina	2–3	Buffalo		Miller	18,719	16–34–8	40	Recap
59	February 26	Boston	4–5	Buffalo	OT	Enroth	19,070	17–34–8	42	Recap
60	February 28	San Jose	2–4	Buffalo		Enroth	19,070	18–34–8	44	Recap

March: 2–11–1 (Home: 0–3–1; Road: 2–8–0)
#	Date	Visitor	Score	Home	OT	Decision	Attendance	Record	Pts	Recap
61	March 3	Buffalo	2–3	Dallas		Enroth	14,235	18–35–8	44	Recap
62	March 6	Buffalo	3–1	Tampa Bay		Enroth	19,204	19–35–8	46	Recap
63	March 7	Buffalo	0–2	Florida		Neuvirth	14,402	19–36–8	46	Recap
64	March 9	Chicago	2–1	Buffalo		Enroth	19,070	19–37–8	46	Recap
65	March 11	Nashville	4–1	Buffalo		Enroth	18,659	19–38–8	46	Recap
66	March 13	Buffalo	2–4	Carolina		Neuvirth	13,654	19–39–8	46	Recap
67	March 15	Buffalo	1–4	NY Islanders		Enroth	14,388	19–40–8	46	Recap
68	March 16	Montreal	2–0	Buffalo		Enroth	19,070	19–41–8	46	Recap
69	March 18	Buffalo	1–3	Calgary		Lieuwen	19,289	19–42–8	46	Recap
70	March 20	Buffalo	3–1	Edmonton		Hackett	16,839	20–42–8	48	Recap
71	March 23	Buffalo	2–4	Vancouver		Lieuwen	18,910	20–43–8	48	Recap
72	March 25	Buffalo	0–2	Montreal		Hackett	21,273	20–44–8	48	Recap
73	March 27	Buffalo	1–6	Nashville		Hackett	16,729	20–45–8	48	Recap
74	March 29	Tampa Bay	4–3	Buffalo	OT	Hackett	19,070	20–45–9	49	Recap

April: 1–6–1 (Home: 1–1–1; Road: 0–5–0)
#	Date	Visitor	Score	Home	OT	Decision	Attendance	Record	Pts	Recap
75	April 1	New Jersey	2–3	Buffalo	SO	Lieuwen	19,070	21–45–9	51	Recap
76	April 3	Buffalo	1–2	St. Louis		Lieuwen	16,146	21–46–9	51	Recap
77	April 4	Buffalo	2–3	Detroit		Hackett	20,066	21–47–9	51	Recap
78	April 6	Buffalo	2–5	Philadelphia		Lieuwen	19,603	21–48–9	51	Recap
79	April 8	Detroit	4–2	Buffalo		Hackett	18,710	21–49–9	51	Recap
80	April 10	Buffalo	1–2	NY Rangers		Hackett	18,006	21–50–9	51	Recap
81	April 12	Buffalo	1–4	Boston		Hackett	17,565	21–51–9	51	Recap
82	April 13	NY Islanders	4–3	Buffalo	SO	Knapp	18,804	21–51–10	52	Recap

Legend: Win (2 points) Loss (0 points) Overtime/shootout loss (1 point)

== Player stats ==
Final stats

Skaters

Regular season
Player	GP	G	A	Pts	+/−	PIM
Cody Hodgson	72	20	24	44	−26	20
Tyler Ennis	80	21	22	43	−25	42
Drew Stafford	70	16	18	34	−19	39
Christian Ehrhoff	79	6	27	33	−27	38
Matt Moulson^{†‡}	44	11	18	29	−8	20
Tyler Myers	62	9	13	22	−26	58
Zemgus Girgensons	70	8	14	22	−6	14
Steve Ott^{‡}	59	9	11	20	−26	55
Marcus Foligno	74	7	12	19	−17	82
Jamie McBain	69	6	11	17	−13	14
Ville Leino	58	0	15	15	−16	10
Brian Flynn	79	6	7	13	−10	14
Matt D'Agostini^{†}	49	5	6	11	−14	22
Thomas Vanek^{‡}	13	4	5	9	−5	4
Mike Weber	68	1	8	9	−29	73
Henrik Tallinder	64	2	6	8	−21	34
Mark Pysyk	44	1	6	7	−11	16
Matt Ellis	50	4	2	6	−6	4
Cory Conacher^{†}	19	3	3	6	−7	16
Cody McCormick^{‡}	29	1	4	5	−8	45
Rasmus Ristolainen	34	2	2	4	−15	6
Johan Larsson	28	0	4	4	0	19
Mikhail Grigorenko	18	2	1	3	−3	2
Phil Varone	9	1	1	2	−3	4
Alexander Sulzer	25	0	2	2	−3	8
Linus Omark^{†‡}	13	0	2	2	−5	6
Torrey Mitchell^{†}	9	1	0	1	0	4
John Scott	56	1	0	1	−12	125
Luke Adam	12	1	0	1	0	4
Nicolas Deslauriers	17	1	0	1	−10	18
Nikita Zadorov	7	1	0	1	−4	4
Zenon Konopka^{†}	23	0	1	1	−4	33
Kevin Porter	12	0	1	1	−5	2
Jake McCabe	7	0	1	1	−3	15
Chad Ruhwedel	21	0	1	1	−3	2
Corey Tropp^{‡}	9	0	1	1	−8	0
Patrick Kaleta	5	0	0	0	−1	5
Chris Stewart^{†}	5	0	0	0	−2	6
Brayden McNabb^{‡}	12	0	0	0	1	6

Goaltenders

Regular season
Player	GP	GS	TOI	W	L	OT	GA	GAA	SA	SV%	SO	G	A	PIM
Ryan Miller^{‡}	40	40	2,383:47	15	22	3	108	2.72	1411	0.923	0	0	2	0
Jhonas Enroth	28	26	1,574:14	4	17	5	74	2.82	834	0.911	0	0	0	0
Matt Hackett	8	8	426:06	1	6	1	22	3.10	239	0.908	0	0	0	0
Nathan Lieuwen	7	5	363:22	1	4	0	18	2.98	191	0.906	0	0	0	0
Michal Neuvirth^{†}	2	2	117:03	0	2	0	5	2.56	98	0.949	0	0	0	0
Connor Knapp	2	1	76:31	0	0	1	4	3.12	32	0.875	0	0	0	0

^{†}Denotes player spent time with another team before joining the Sabres. Stats reflect time with the Sabres only.
^{‡}Denotes player was traded mid-season. Stats reflect time with the Sabres only.
Bold/italics denotes franchise record.

=== Milestones ===
Regular season
Player	Milestone	Reached
Zemgus Girgensons	1st Career NHL Game; 1st Career NHL Goal; 1st Career NHL Point	October 2, 2013
Rasmus Ristolainen	1st Career NHL Game	October 2, 2013
Zemgus Girgensons	1st Career NHL Assist	October 14, 2013
Kevin Porter	200th Career NHL Game	October 14, 2013
Nikita Zadorov	1st Career NHL Game	October 19, 2013
Nikita Zadorov	1st Career NHL Goal; 1st Career NHL Point	October 23, 2013
Rasmus Ristolainen	1st Career NHL Goal; 1st Career NHL Point	October 25, 2013
Tyler Ennis	200th Career NHL Game	October 26, 2013
Johan Larsson	1st Career NHL Assist; 1st Career NHL Point	November 2, 2013
Tyler Myers	300th Career NHL Game	January 18, 2014
Steve Ott	100th Career NHL Goal	January 21, 2014
Phil Varone	1st Career NHL Game; 1st Career NHL Assist; 1st Career NHL Point	January 23, 2014
Phil Varone	1st Career NHL Goal	January 28, 2014
Nicolas Deslauriers	1st Career NHL Game	March 7, 2014
Drew Stafford	500th Career NHL Game	March 11, 2014
Matt Ellis	300th Career NHL Game	March 11, 2014
Nathan Lieuwen	1st Career NHL Game	March 16, 2014
Rasmus Ristolainen	1st Career NHL Assist	March 29, 2014
Nathan Lieuwen	1st Career NHL Win	April 1, 2014
Jake McCabe	1st Career NHL Game	April 3, 2014
Nicolas Deslauriers	1st Career NHL Goal; 1st Career NHL Point	April 4, 2014
Chad Ruhwedel	1st Career NHL Assist; 1st Career NHL Point	April 4, 2014
Connor Knapp	1st Career NHL Game	April 12, 2014
Jake McCabe	1st Career NHL Assist; 1st Career NHL Point	April 13, 2014

== Transactions ==
The Sabres have been involved in the following transactions during the 2013–14 season:

=== Trades ===
June 30, 2013	To Carolina Hurricanes Andrej Sekera	To Buffalo Sabres Jamie McBain; 2nd-round pick in 2013 – J. T. Compher
July 7, 2013	To New Jersey Devils Riley Boychuk	To Buffalo Sabres Henrik Tallinder
October 27, 2013	To New York Islanders Thomas Vanek	To Buffalo Sabres Matt Moulson; 1st-round pick in 2015 (Note: Pick subsequently traded to Ottawa Senators.) – Colin White; 2nd-round pick in 2015 – Brendan Guhle
December 19, 2013	To Edmonton Oilers Conditional 6th-round pick in 2014 (Note: Condition not satisfied.)	To Buffalo Sabres Linus Omark
February 28, 2014	To St. Louis Blues Ryan Miller; Steve Ott	To Buffalo Sabres Jaroslav Halak; Chris Stewart; William Carrier; 1st-round pick in 2015 (Note: Pick subsequently traded to Winnipeg Jets.) – Jack Roslovic; Conditional 3rd-round pick in 2016 – Linus Nassen
March 5, 2014	To Los Angeles Kings Brayden McNabb; Jonathan Parker; 2nd-round pick in 2014 – Alex Lintuniemi; 2nd-round pick in 2015 – Erik Cernak	To Buffalo Sabres Nicolas Deslauriers; Hudson Fasching
March 5, 2014	To Washington Capitals Jaroslav Halak; 3rd-round pick in 2015 – Robin Kovacs	To Buffalo Sabres Michal Neuvirth; Rostislav Klesla
March 5, 2014	To Minnesota Wild Matt Moulson; Cody McCormick	To Buffalo Sabres Torrey Mitchell; 2nd-round pick in 2014 (Note: Pick subsequently traded to Washington Capitals.) – Vitek Vanecek; 2nd-round pick in 2016 (Note: Pick subsequently traded to Montreal Canadiens, then to Chicago Blackhawks.) – Chad Krys

=== Free agents acquired ===
Player	Former team	Contract terms
Drew Bagnall	Houston Aeros	2 years, $1.1 million
Jamie Tardif	Providence Bruins	1 year, $550,000

=== Free agents lost ===
Player	New team	Contract terms
Mark Mancari	St. Louis Blues	1 year, $600,000
Adam Pardy	Winnipeg Jets	1 year, $600,000
Nathan Gerbe	Carolina Hurricanes	1 year, $550,000

=== Claimed via waivers ===
Player	Previous team	Date
Matt D'Agostini	Pittsburgh Penguins	November 27, 2013
Zenon Konopka	Minnesota Wild	January 3, 2014
Cory Conacher	Ottawa Senators	March 5, 2014

=== Lost via waivers ===
Player	New team	Date
Corey Tropp	Columbus Blue Jackets	November 28, 2013

=== Lost via retirement ===
Player
Jochen Hecht

=== Players released ===
Player	Date
Linus Omark	February 18, 2014

=== Player signings ===
Player	Date	Contract terms
Matt Ellis	July 3, 2013	2 years, $1.1 million
Alexander Sulzer	July 5, 2013	1 year, $725,000
Rasmus Ristolainen	July 12, 2013	3 years, $2.775 million entry-level contract
Nick Crawford	July 19, 2013	1 year, $550,000
Brian Flynn	July 19, 2013	2 years, $1.275 million
Matt Hackett	July 23, 2013	1 year, $715,000
Luke Adam	July 23, 2013	1 year, $735,000
Corey Tropp	August 6, 2013	1 year, $577,500
Cody Hodgson	September 11, 2013	6 years, $25.5 million
Nikita Zadorov	September 25, 2013	3 years, $2.775 million entry-level contract
Justin Kea	April 1, 2014	3 years, $1.94 million entry-level contract
Jake McCabe	April 2, 2014	3 years, $2.775 million entry-level contract
Nicolas Deslauriers	May 26, 2014	2 years, $1.275 million contract extension
Linus Ullmark	May 27, 2014	3 years, $2.775 million entry-level contract
Brady Austin	May 29, 2014	3 years, $1.88 million entry-level contract
Nicholas Baptiste	May 31, 2014	3 years, $2.7 million entry-level contract

== Draft picks ==
Buffalo Sabres' picks at the 2013 NHL entry draft, to be held in Newark, New Jersey on June 30, 2013.

Round	#	Player	Pos	Nationality	College/Junior/Club team (League)
1	8	Rasmus Ristolainen	Defense	Finland	TPS (SM-liiga)
1	16^{[a]}	Nikita Zadorov	Defense	Russia	CSKA Moscow (KHL)
2	35^{[b]}	J. T. Compher	Center	United States	U.S. National Team Development Program (USHL)
2	38	Connor Hurley	Center	United States	Edina High School (USHS-MN)
2	52^{[c]}	Justin Bailey	Right wing	United States	Kitchener Rangers (OHL)
3	69	Nicholas Baptiste	Right wing	Canada	Sudbury Wolves (OHL)
5	129	Cal Petersen	Goaltender	United States	Waterloo Black Hawks (USHL)
5	130^{[d]}	Gustav Possler	Right wing	Sweden	Modo Hockey J20 (J20 SuperElit)
5	143^{[e]}	Anthony Florentino	Defense	United States	South Kent School (USHS-CT)
6	159	Sean Malone	Center	United States	U.S. National Team Development Program (USHL)
7	189	Eric Locke	Center	United States	Saginaw Spirit (OHL)

Draft notes

- ^{a} The Minnesota Wild's first-round pick went to the Buffalo Sabres as a result of an April 3, 2013, trade that sent Jason Pominville and a 2014 fourth-round pick to the Wild in exchange for Johan Larsson, Matt Hackett and this pick.
- ^{[b]}The Carolina Hurricanes' second-round pick went to the Buffalo Sabres at the draft in a trade that sent Andrej Sekera to Carolina for Jamie McBain and this pick.
- ^{c} The St. Louis Blues' second-round pick went to the Buffalo Sabres as a result of a March 30, 2013, trade that sent Jordan Leopold to the Blues in exchange for a conditional 2013 fifth-round pick and this pick.
- The Buffalo Sabres' fourth-round pick went to the Nashville Predators as the result of a February 27, 2012, trade that sent a 2012 first-round pick (#21–Mark Jankowski) to the Sabres in exchange for Paul Gaustad and this pick.
- ^{d} The New Jersey Devils' fifth-round pick went to the Buffalo Sabres (via Los Angeles and Florida), Florida traded this pick to Buffalo as a result of a March 15, 2013, trade that sent T. J. Brennan to the Panthers in exchange for this pick.
- ^{e} The St. Louis Blues' fifth-round pick went to the Buffalo Sabres as a result of a March 30, 2013, trade that sent Jordan Leopold to the Blues in exchange for a 2013 second-round pick and this pick.
