= Santeri Saari =

Finnish ice hockey player

- Born: October 11, 1994 (age 31) Helsinki, Finland
- Height: 6 ft 4 in (193 cm)
- Weight: 216 lb (98 kg; 15 st 6 lb)
- Position: Defence
- Shoots: Right
- Erste team Former teams: Gyergyói HK; Jokerit; BIK Karlskoga; HPK; Pionniers de Chamonix Mont-Blanc; Sparta Sarpsborg
- NHL draft: 173th overall, 2013; St. Louis Blues
- Playing career: 2013–present

Santeri Saari (born October 18, 1994) is a Finnish professional ice hockey defenceman. He is currently playing with the Gyergyói HK in the Erste Liga. Saari was selected by the St. Louis Blues in the 6th round (173rd overall) of the 2013 NHL entry draft.

Saari made his SM-liiga debut playing with Jokerit during the 2012–13 SM-liiga season.

Following his Liiga stints with Jokerit and HPK, Saari left the Mestis, signing with the farm team of Austrian outfit, the Vienna Capitals, of the Erste Liga on August 1, 2018.

== Career statistics ==
=== Regular season and playoffs ===
			Regular season					Playoffs
Season	Team	League	GP	G	A	Pts	PIM	GP	G	A	Pts	PIM
2010–11	Jokerit	Jr. A	3	0	0	0	2	—	—	—	—	—
2011–12	Jokerit	Jr. A	13	2	2	4	10	—	—	—	—	—
2012–13	Jokerit	Jr. A	6	5	18	23	32	—	—	—	—	—
2012–13	Jokerit	SM-l	2	0	0	0	0	—	—	—	—	—
2012–13	Kiekko-Vantaa	Mestis	7	0	0	0	6	—	—	—	—	—
2013–14	Jokerit	Jr. A	7	1	5	6	4	—	—	—	—	—
2013–14	Kiekko-Vantaa	Mestis	25	1	0	1	12	—	—	—	—	—
2014–15	Jokerit	KHL	9	1	0	1	6	—	—	—	—	—
2014–15	Kiekko-Vantaa	Mestis	1	0	0	0	0	—	—	—	—	—
2014–15	BIK Karlskoga	Allsv	18	0	5	5	12	—	—	—	—	—
2014–15	HPK	Liiga	13	2	1	3	4	—	—	—	—	—
2015–16	HPK	Liiga	45	3	6	9	12	—	—	—	—	—
2016–17	Peliitat	Mestis	7	1	1	2	6	—	—	—	—	—
2017–18	Espoo United	Mestis	42	2	6	8	26	—	—	—	—	—
2018–19	Vienna Capitals Silver	Erste	52	10	15	25	38	4	0	0	0	0
2019–20	Pionniers de Chamonix Mont-Blanc	FRA	22	1	2	3	45	—	—	—	—	—
2019–20	VEU Feldkirch	AlpsHL	9	1	7	8	2	—	—	—	—	—
2019–20	Sparta Sarpsborg	GET	7	1	2	3	0	—	—	—	—	—
2020–21	Sparta Sarpsborg	Norway	19	1	3	4	10	—	—	—	—	—
Liiga totals			60	5	7	12	16	—	—	—	—	—
KHL totals			9	1	0	1	6	—	—	—	—	—

=== International ===
Year	Team	Event	Result	GP	G	A	Pts	PIM
2011	Finland	U17	7th	5	0	0	0	0
Junior totals				5	0	0	0	0
