= Richard Pánik =

Slovak ice hockey player (born 1991)

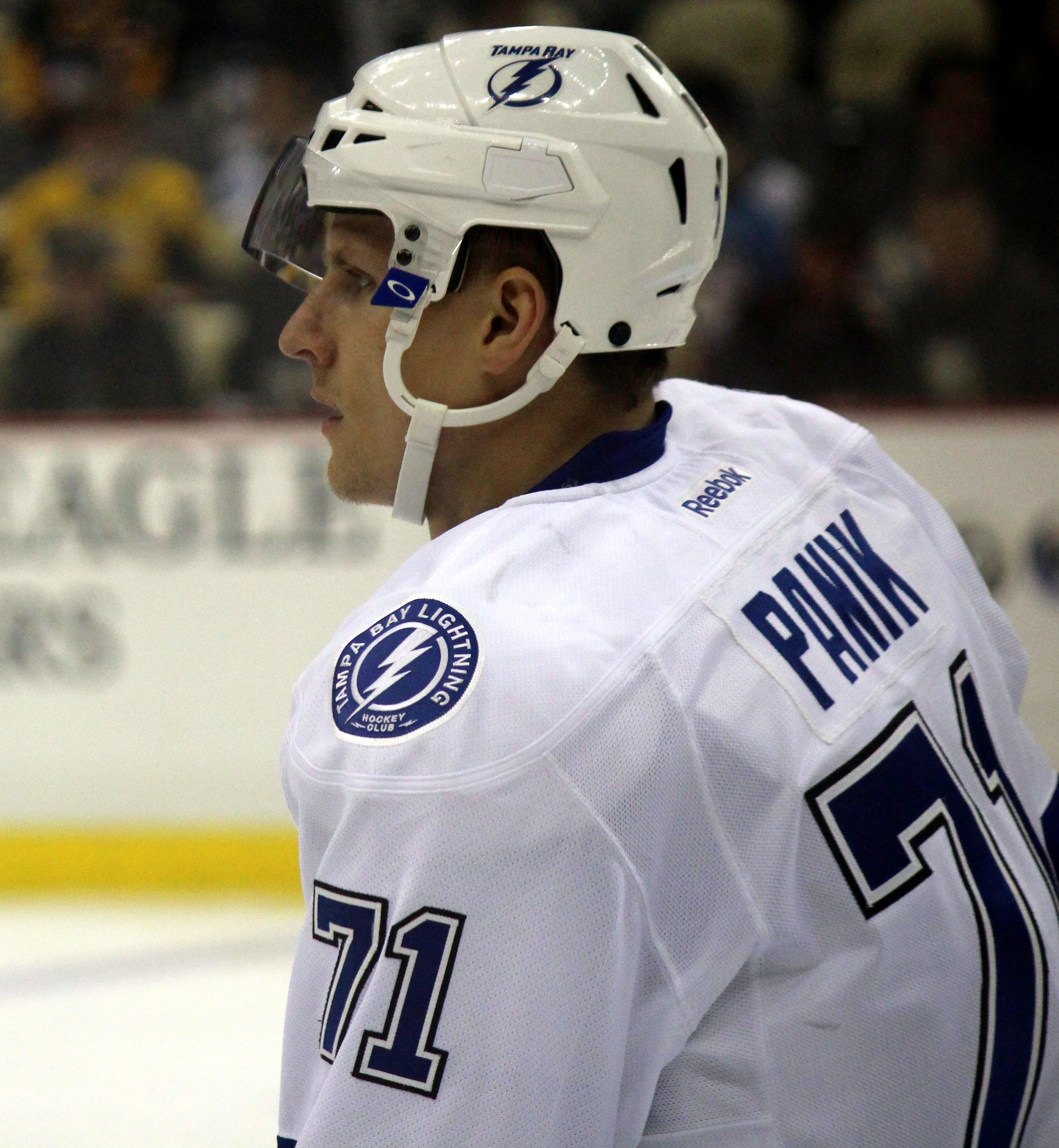
- Panik with the Tampa Bay Lightning in March 2014
- Born: 7 February 1991 (age 35) Martin, Czechoslovakia
- Height: 6 ft 2 in (188 cm)
- Weight: 202 lb (92 kg; 14 st 6 lb)
- Position: Right wing
- Shoots: Left
- Played for: HC Oceláři Třinec; Tampa Bay Lightning; Toronto Maple Leafs; Chicago Blackhawks; Arizona Coyotes; Washington Capitals; Detroit Red Wings; New York Islanders; Lausanne HC; HC Dynamo Pardubice; HC Slovan Bratislava
- National team: Slovakia
- NHL draft: 52nd overall, 2009; Tampa Bay Lightning
- Playing career: 2007–present

Richard Pánik (Slovak pronunciation: [ˈrixart ˈpaːɲik]; born 7 February 1991) is a Slovak professional ice hockey player who plays as a right winger. Pánik was drafted in the second round, 52nd overall, in the 2009 NHL entry draft by the Tampa Bay Lightning.

== Playing career ==
=== Junior ===
As a youth, Pánik played in the 2004 Quebec International Pee-Wee Hockey Tournament with a team from Bratislava.

Pánik played two years professionally for HC Oceláři Třinec of the Czech Extraliga (ELH) before being drafted in the second round, 52nd overall, of the 2009 NHL entry draft by the Tampa Bay Lightning. He attended the Lightning's training camp ahead of the 2009–10 season but was ultimately cut from their roster, after which he joined the Windsor Spitfires of the Ontario Hockey League (OHL). Later that season, Pánik played for Slovakia at the 2009 World Junior Ice Hockey Championships, where he scored two goals and three assists in five games.

On 5 January 2010, the Spitfires sent Pánik to the Belleville Bulls in a blockbuster trade, along with Austen Brassard, Steve Gleeson, Paul Bezzo, a second-round pick in 2012, a third-round pick in 2010 and a seventh-round pick in 2012, in exchange for Philipp Grubauer, Marc Cantin and Stephen Johnson.

=== Professional ===
Turning professional in 2011–12, Pánik was a member of the Norfolk Admirals team that set the longest win streak in professional hockey in North America, winning a record-breaking 28 consecutive victories that season. Pánik also helped the Admirals capture the Calder Cup championship in a 4–0 sweep over the Toronto Marlies.

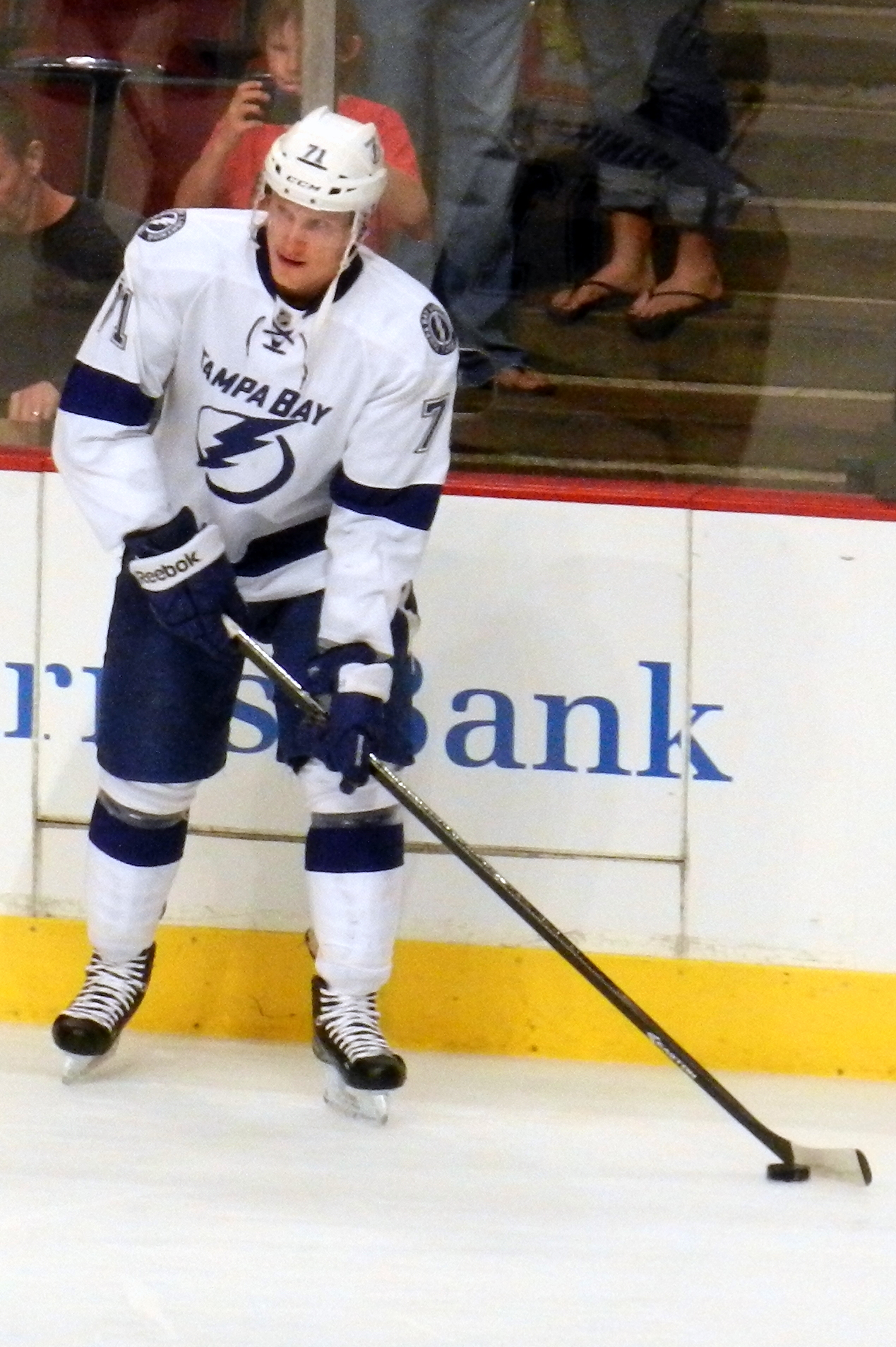
Pánik warming up before a game in October 2013.

Due to the 2012–13 NHL lockout that cancelled nearly half of the regular season, Tampa Bay assigned Pánik, as well as 17 others, to the Syracuse Crunch, the Lightning's new AHL affiliate for the 2012–13 season. On 11 February 2013, several weeks after NHL play had resumed, the Lightning recalled Pánik, where he later scored his first career NHL goal on 23 February against Dan Ellis of the Carolina Hurricanes in a 5–2 victory. On 1 March, the Tampa Bay Lightning reassigned Pánik to Syracuse after playing nine games in the NHL, registering one goal from eight shots on net. At the end of the AHL regular season, Pánik had played in 43 games with the Crunch, recording 21 goals and 35 points, including an AHL-high 12-game point streak from 2 November through 1 December 2013, with 17. Pánik then helped Syracuse reach the Calder Cup Final, though the team fell to the Grand Rapids Griffins in a 4–2 series defeat.

Pánik made the 2013–14 Lightning roster out of training camp to begin the regular season. Despite making the team, he saw his playing time dwindle as the season went on, however, and, after struggling to find consistency in his game, was demoted on 24 January 2014, to Syracuse. Several months later, on 5 March, Tampa Bay again recalled Pánik from the Crunch. He finished the regular season with 50 appearances for Tampa Bay, scoring three goals and ten assists for 13 points, in addition to Stanley Cup playoff games played against the Montreal Canadiens in the Eastern Conference Quarter-finals.

On 11 July 2014, Pánik signed a one-year, two-way contract extension with Tampa Bay. After failing to make the 2014–15 Lightning roster out of training camp, however, he was placed on waivers, where he was then claimed by the Toronto Maple Leafs on 9 October 2014. On 25 October, he scored his first goal as a Maple Leaf in a 4–1 loss to the visiting Boston Bruins. Pánik experienced a breakout season in Toronto, setting career-highs in games played (76), goals scored (11) and points (17). Following this noteworthy campaign, on 1 July 2015, Pánik signed a one-year, $925,000 contract with the Maple Leafs.

Pánik was expected to play with the Maple Leafs in the 2015–16 season; however, he was beaten on the depth chart by new additions such as Brad Boyes and P. A. Parenteau. Additionally, the Maple Leafs claimed defenceman Frank Corrado off waivers on 6 October 2015. Having reached the maximum roster size, Pánik was placed on waivers with the purpose of being sent down to the Toronto Marlies. Pánik cleared waivers the following day.

On 3 January 2016, after playing 32 games with the Marlies, Pánik was traded to the Chicago Blackhawks in exchange for Jeremy Morin. He finished the season with the Blackhawks and was re-signed to a one year, $875,000 contract extension. Pánik scored his first career NHL hat-trick against the Nashville Predators on 15 October 2016. Pánik tallied a career-high 22 goals and 22 assists during the 2016–17 season. On 11 May 2017, he signed a two-year extension worth $2.8 million per year with the Blackhawks.

On 10 January 2018, Pánik (alongside Laurent Dauphin) was traded to the Arizona Coyotes in exchange for Anthony Duclair and Adam Clendening.

On 1 July 2019, as a free agent from the Coyotes, Pánik left to sign a four-year $11 million contract with the Washington Capitals.

During the pandemic delayed 2020–21 season, on 12 April 2021, Pánik was traded at the trade deadline to the Detroit Red Wings, along with Jakub Vrána, a first-round pick in 2021, and a second-round pick in 2022, in exchange for Anthony Mantha. In closing out the regular season with the cellar-dwelling Red Wings, Pánik registered 1 goal and 4 points in 12 games.

On 16 July 2021, Pánik was traded by the Red Wings, along with a second-round pick in the 2021 NHL entry draft, to the New York Islanders in exchange for Nick Leddy. In the following 2021–22 season, after clearing waivers Pánik was assigned by the Islanders to AHL affiliate, the Bridgeport Islanders. He played in 28 games with the Bridgeport, recording seven goals and five assists for 12 points. He also collected one assist in four appearances in a recall with New York. On 28 March 2022, Pánik was loaned by the Islanders to the Chicago Wolves of the AHL for the remainder of the season.

On 12 October 2022, Pánik signed a one-year contract with Lausanne HC of the Swiss National League (NL). On 13 March 2023, the team announced that they would not re-sign Pánik after the team failed to qualify for the playoffs during the 2022–23 season.

On 2 July 2023, Pánik agreed to return to HC Oceláři Třinec of the Czech Extraliga on a one-year contract.

On 27 September 2024, HC Slovan Bratislava announced Pánik signed a short-term contract with the team, lasting until November league break. Following the end of his contract with Bratislava, Pánik signed with Lokomotiv Yaroslavl of the Kontinental Hockey League (KHL) for the remainder of the 2024–25 season. As part of Lokomotiv, Panik won two Gagarin Cups in a row.

== International play ==
Pánik was selected to play for Slovakia at the 2010 World Championship, where he recorded two assists and finished a plus-minus rating of +3.

Pánik also represented Slovakia at the 2014 Winter Olympics in Sochi, where the team finished 11th in the tournament; Pánik did not record a point.

== Personal life ==
In July 2016, Pánik married his long-time girlfriend, Nikola Kochanová.

In April 2018, Pánik was arrested after refusing to leave the entrance of Bevvy, near Scottsdale, Arizona. He was later released with criminal citation.

== Career statistics ==
=== Regular season and playoffs ===
			Regular season					Playoffs
Season	Team	League	GP	G	A	Pts	PIM	GP	G	A	Pts	PIM
2004–05	HC Martimex ZŤS Martin	SVK U18	2	1	0	1	0	—	—	—	—	—
2005–06	MHC Martin	SVK U18	40	11	13	24	20	4	4	2	6	4
2006–07	HC Oceláři Třinec	CZE U18	12	10	6	16	48	3	1	4	5	8
2006–07	HC Oceláři Třinec	CZE U20	27	16	9	25	30	4	1	4	5	6
2007–08	HC Oceláři Třinec	CZE U20	39	35	27	62	70	8	8	4	12	52
2007–08	HC Oceláři Třinec	ELH	6	0	0	0	0	—	—	—	—	—
2008–09	HC Oceláři Třinec	CZE U20	16	10	9	19	36	8	6	1	7	41
2008–09	HC Oceláři Třinec	ELH	15	1	1	2	4	4	0	0	0	0
2008–09	HC Havířov Panthers	CZE.2	3	2	1	3	0	—	—	—	—	—
2009–10	Windsor Spitfires	OHL	33	9	9	18	19	—	—	—	—	—
2009–10	Belleville Bulls	OHL	27	12	11	23	36	—	—	—	—	—
2009–10	Norfolk Admirals	AHL	5	0	1	1	0	—	—	—	—	—
2010–11	Belleville Bulls	OHL	27	14	17	31	33	—	—	—	—	—
2010–11	Guelph Storm	OHL	24	13	12	25	42	6	1	2	3	10
2011–12	Norfolk Admirals	AHL	64	19	22	41	62	18	5	1	6	23
2012–13	Syracuse Crunch	AHL	51	22	19	41	81	16	9	5	14	59
2012–13	Tampa Bay Lightning	NHL	25	5	4	9	4	—	—	—	—	—
2013–14	Tampa Bay Lightning	NHL	50	3	10	13	21	2	0	0	0	4
2013–14	Syracuse Crunch	AHL	13	3	8	11	8	—	—	—	—	—
2014–15	Toronto Maple Leafs	NHL	76	11	6	17	49	—	—	—	—	—
2015–16	Toronto Marlies	AHL	33	9	16	25	34	—	—	—	—	—
2015–16	Chicago Blackhawks	NHL	30	6	2	8	6	6	0	3	3	6
2016–17	Chicago Blackhawks	NHL	82	22	22	44	58	4	0	1	1	2
2017–18	Chicago Blackhawks	NHL	37	6	10	16	26	—	—	—	—	—
2017–18	Arizona Coyotes	NHL	35	8	11	19	12	—	—	—	—	—
2018–19	Arizona Coyotes	NHL	75	14	19	33	44	—	—	—	—	—
2019–20	Washington Capitals	NHL	59	9	13	22	36	8	1	0	1	6
2020–21	Washington Capitals	NHL	36	3	6	9	16	—	—	—	—	—
2020–21	Detroit Red Wings	NHL	12	1	3	4	2	—	—	—	—	—
2021–22	New York Islanders	NHL	4	0	1	1	0	—	—	—	—	—
2021–22	Bridgeport Islanders	AHL	28	7	5	12	22	—	—	—	—	—
2021–22	Chicago Wolves	AHL	11	2	5	7	21	16	6	5	11	28
2022–23	Lausanne HC	NL	19	4	5	9	12	—	—	—	—	—
2023–24	HC Oceláři Třinec	ELH	36	14	10	24	26	—	—	—	—	—
2023–24	HC Dynamo Pardubice	ELH	15	6	4	10	8	14	3	1	4	10
2024–25	HC Slovan Bratislava	SVK	18	6	7	13	12	—	—	—	—	—
2024–25	Lokomotiv Yaroslavl	KHL	29	6	6	12	6	15	1	3	4	2
2025–26	Lokomotiv Yaroslavl	KHL	38	4	11	15	18	22	5	6	11	16
NHL totals			517	88	106	194	274	20	1	4	5	18

=== International ===
Year	Team	Event	Result	GP	G	A	Pts	PIM
2007	Slovakia	U18	5th	6	0	2	2	2
2008	Slovakia	U18	7th	6	4	6	10	0
2009	Slovakia	WJC	4th	7	2	3	5	4
2010	Slovakia	WJC	8th	6	6	2	8	2
2010	Slovakia	WC	12th	6	0	2	2	6
2011	Slovakia	WJC	8th	6	7	2	9	12
2014	Slovakia	OG	11th	4	0	0	0	0
2014	Slovakia	WC	9th	7	0	0	0	2
2015	Slovakia	WC	9th	7	0	2	2	2
2019	Slovakia	WC	9th	7	1	6	7	2
2023	Slovakia	WC	9th	7	3	2	5	2
Junior totals				31	19	15	34	20
Senior totals				38	4	12	16	14

== Awards and honours ==
Award	Year
KHL
Gagarin Cup champion	2025, 2026
AHL
Calder Cup champion	2012, 2022
All-Star Game	2013
