= 2013–14 Detroit Red Wings season =

Sports season

2013–14 Detroit Red Wings
- Division: 4th Atlantic
- Conference: 8th Eastern
- 2013–14 record: 39–28–15
- Home record: 18–13–10
- Road record: 21–15–5
- Goals for: 222
- Goals against: 230

Team information
- General manager: Ken Holland
- Coach: Mike Babcock
- Captain: Henrik Zetterberg
- Alternate captains: Pavel Datsyuk; Niklas Kronwall
- Arena: Joe Louis Arena
- Average attendance: 22,149 (110.4%); Total: 908,131
- Minor league affiliates: Grand Rapids Griffins (AHL); Toledo Walleye (ECHL)

Team leaders
- Goals: Gustav Nyquist (28)
- Assists: Niklas Kronwall (41)
- Points: Daniel Alfredsson (49); Niklas Kronwall
- Penalty minutes: Kyle Quincey (88)
- Plus/minus: Henrik Zetterberg (+19)
- Wins: Jimmy Howard (21)
- Goals against average: Petr Mrazek (1.74)

The 2013–14 Detroit Red Wings season was the 88th season for the National Hockey League (NHL) franchise that was established on September 25, 1926. In the 2013–14 season, the Wings went 39–28–15, finishing fourth in the Atlantic Division and qualifying for the 2014 Stanley Cup playoffs as a Wildcard. The team was eliminated in the first round of the playoffs, losing the best-of-seven series to the Boston Bruins, four games to one.

Mike Babcock served his ninth year as head coach of the Red Wings, while Henrik Zetterberg served as the team's captain.

== Realignment ==
This will mark the first season of a new divisional format change which the number of divisions are reduced to four. Detroit will be in a division with the Boston Bruins, Ottawa Senators, Montreal Canadiens, Buffalo Sabres, Florida Panthers, Tampa Bay Lightning and Toronto Maple Leafs in the Eastern Conference as opposed to the Red Wings long standing within the Western Conference. This format will continue until the league either expands or a relocation requires a change.

It will also present an added difficulty in extending the club's playoff streak. The Red Wings' division is one of two eight-team divisions, as opposed to two seven-team divisions in the West. According to NHL.com "The Stanley Cup Playoffs will still consist of 16 teams, eight in each conference, but it will be division-based and a wild-card system has been added.

The top three teams in each division will make up the first 12 teams in the playoffs. The remaining four spots will be filled by the next two highest-placed finishers in each conference, based on regular-season points and regardless of division. It will be possible, then, for one division to send five teams to the post-season while the other sends three." This means the Eastern Conference teams will fight to be one of eight teams out of 16, while the Western Conference has better odds with eight of 14 teams making the playoffs. The Red Wings will have a statistically harder time making the playoffs under this format. The league dismissed the issue as minor and focused on increased home and home series and the vast majority of games being played in the teams own time zone.

Members of the media also predicted that Detroit and the Columbus Blue Jackets (the other team to switch conferences from the west) would benefit from the greatly reduced travel and less physical level of play on average in the Eastern Conference. The move of Detroit and Columbus to the Eastern Conference allowed the Winnipeg Jets to be moved to the Western Conference, two calendar years from when the Atlanta Thrashers were officially relocated and renamed the Jets (not to be confused with the Winnipeg Jets (1972–96), who are still the Phoenix Coyotes).

The Red Wings will compete directly against three of the Original Six teams in their division, as well as against the team of the general manager of the Tampa Bay Lightning and former Red Wing Hockey Hall of Famer, Steve Yzerman. They will lose longtime rivals in the Chicago Blackhawks and St. Louis Blues. They also will no longer serve as the rivals for the Nashville Predators or Columbus Blue Jackets, though they would still have a decent shot at meeting Columbus in the Conference play in the playoffs as well as play every team in the NHL at least twice per year in the regular season.

It is likely that there will be an NHL league expansion in the near future, but Detroit will likely remain in the Eastern Conference permanently after a hard-fought campaign over the years to be moved East.

The team will also play in a rescheduled Winter Classic game on New Year's Day at Michigan Stadium in Ann Arbor, Michigan, as well as participate in alumni games and other events at Comerica Park. The planned events were temporarily cancelled following the 2012–13 NHL lockout.

== Off-season ==
On June 18, 2013, the Red Wings re-signed fan favorite and all-star Pavel Datsyuk to a three-year extension that will keep him in Detroit through the 2016–17 season and pay him $23 million.

In a surprise move that shocked Ottawa fans, captain and multiple franchise record holder Daniel Alfredsson signed as a free agent a one-year $5.5 million contract with the Red Wings on July 5, the first day of free agency. This came as a surprise to Detroit fans, as the 18-year veteran seemed destined to retire having only played for the Senators. "It pretty much came down to a selfish decision in terms of I have not won a Stanley Cup, a big priority for me," Alfredsson explained in a candid conference call with the media.

Alfredsson continued explaining how hard of a decision it was and gave his reasoning. "I feel that in Ottawa they are getting closer and closer and they have a really bright future in front of them, but at this point in my career there's not much left," Alfredsson said. "I don't have the time to wait for that." He also stated that, "I didn't really see myself making a change if you would have asked me a week ago, but as we got closer to free agency, thoughts started creeping in I've played 18 years and haven't won a Stanley Cup." Ottawa, coincidentally, host the Detroit Red Wings several times in the 2013–14 season due to a change to a four-division realignment format that brings Detroit into the Eastern Conference, as well as the same division as Ottawa.

Signing Alfredsson seemed to close the door on young bright spot from the prior season, Damien Brunner. Detroit added on the same day centre Stephen Weiss, a former fourth overall pick in 2001 of the Florida Panthers. His numbers were comparable to Valtteri Filppula, who the club seemed unwilling to pay the $5 million salary he wanted, and instead gave Weiss a five-year deal worth $4.9 million per year.

The Red Wings also lost three key members of the front-office staff when Jim Nill, former director of amateur scouting for the Red Wings, took the general management job of the Dallas Stars. Joe McDonnell, who replaced Nill for a few weeks as director of amateur scouting, and amateur scout Mark Leach followed their former colleague Nill to the Stars.

== Regular season ==
The Red Wings set a franchise record this season, surpassing their most man-games lost due to injury or illness in one season since the stat started being kept in 1985–86. The previous high was 346, which Detroit eclipsed on March 23 against the Minnesota Wild. Detroit ended the season with 421 man-games lost, second only to the Pittsburgh Penguins, including six key players who missed at least 25 games. Fifteen players missed ten or more games, resulting in Detroit dressing 38 different players during the regular season. That marks the most since the team used 45 in the 1990–91 season. Nine players made their NHL debuts with the Red Wings this season, their highest total since 14 debuted in 1990–91.

The Red Wings reached several milestones as a franchise this season, including their 3,000th home game (1/31 vs. Washington), 3,000th road game (2/26 at Montreal) and 6,000th game (2/8 at Tampa Bay). After the 2013–14 regular season, the Red Wings stood at 2,774–2,328–815–107, ranking third in NHL history in wins.

== Standings ==
Atlantic Division
Pos	Team	GP	W	L	OTL	ROW	GF	GA	GD	Pts
1	p – Boston Bruins	82	54	19	9	51	261	177	+84	117
2	x – Tampa Bay Lightning	82	46	27	9	38	240	215	+25	101
3	x – Montreal Canadiens	82	46	28	8	40	215	204	+11	100
4	x – Detroit Red Wings	82	39	28	15	34	222	230	−8	93
5	Ottawa Senators	82	37	31	14	30	236	265	−29	88
6	Toronto Maple Leafs	82	38	36	8	29	231	256	−25	84
7	Florida Panthers	82	29	45	8	21	196	268	−72	66
8	Buffalo Sabres	82	21	51	10	14	157	248	−91	52

Source: National Hockey League
p – Clinched Presidents' Trophy; x – Clinched playoff spot

Eastern Conference Wild Card
Pos	Div	Team	GP	W	L	OTL	ROW	GF	GA	GD	Pts
1	ME	x – Columbus Blue Jackets	82	43	32	7	38	231	216	+15	93
2	AT	x – Detroit Red Wings	82	39	28	15	34	222	230	−8	93
3	ME	Washington Capitals	82	38	30	14	28	235	240	−5	90
4	ME	New Jersey Devils	82	35	29	18	35	197	208	−11	88
5	AT	Ottawa Senators	82	37	31	14	30	236	265	−29	88
6	AT	Toronto Maple Leafs	82	38	36	8	29	231	256	−25	84
7	ME	Carolina Hurricanes	82	36	35	11	34	207	230	−23	83
8	ME	New York Islanders	82	34	37	11	25	225	267	−42	79
9	AT	Florida Panthers	82	29	45	8	21	196	268	−72	66
10	AT	Buffalo Sabres	82	21	51	10	14	157	248	−91	52

Source: National Hockey League
x – Clinched playoff spot

== Schedule and results ==
=== Pre-season ===
2013 preseason game log: 3–5–0 (Home: 1–3–0; Road: 2–2–0)
#	Date	Visitor	Score	Home	OT	Decision	Attendance	Record	Recap
1	September 16	Detroit	W 4–1	Pittsburgh		Howard	17,610	1–0–0	Recap
2	September 17	Detroit	L 0–2	Chicago		Gustavsson	20,071	1–1–0	Recap
3	September 19	Detroit	W 8–2	Boston		Howard	16,839	2–1–0	Recap
4	September 21	Boston	L 2–0	Detroit		Gustavsson	15,516	2–2–0	Recap
5	September 22	Chicago	L 4–3	Detroit		Howard	15,022	2–3–0	Recap
6	September 25	Pittsburgh	L 5–1	Detroit		Mrazek	14,712	2–4–0	Recap
7	September 27	Toronto	W 2–5	Detroit		Howard	18,508	3–4–0	Recap
8	September 28	Detroit	L 1–3	Toronto		Mrazek	19,320	3–5–0	Recap

=== Regular season ===
2013–14 Game Log

October: 7–4–2 (Home: 3–2–2; Road: 4–2–0)
#	Date	Visitor	Score	Home	OT	Decision	Attendance	Record	Pts	Recap
1	October 2	Buffalo	W 1–2	Detroit		Howard	20,066	1–0–0	2	Recap
2	October 4	Detroit	W 3–2	Carolina	OT	Howard	18,680	2–0–0	4	Recap
3	October 5	Detroit	L 1–4	Boston		Howard	17,565	2–1–0	4	Recap
4	October 10	Phoenix	L 4–2	Detroit		Howard	20,066	2–2–0	4	Recap
5	October 12	Philadelphia	W 2–5	Detroit		Howard	20,066	3–2–0	6	Recap
6	October 14	Detroit	W 3–2	Boston		Gustavsson	17,565	4–2–0	8	Recap
7	October 15	Columbus	W 1–2	Detroit		Gustavsson	20,066	5–2–0	10	Recap
8	October 17	Detroit	W 4–2	Colorado		Gustavsson	18,101	6–2–0	12	Recap
9	October 19	Detroit	L 2–5	Phoenix		Howard	14,624	6–3–0	12	Recap
10	October 21	San Jose	L 1–0	Detroit	SO	Howard	20,066	6–3–1	13	Recap
11	October 23	Ottawa	L 6–1	Detroit		Howard	20,066	6–4–1	13	Recap
12	October 26	N.Y. Rangers	L 3–2	Detroit	OT	Howard	20,066	6–4–2	14	Recap
13	October 30	Detroit	W 2–1	Vancouver		Howard	18,910	7–4–2	16	Recap

November: 6–3–5 (Home: 2–2–4; Road: 4–1–1)
#	Date	Visitor	Score	Home	OT	Decision	Attendance	Record	Pts	Recap
14	November 1	Detroit	W 4–3	Calgary		Howard	19,289	8–4–2	18	Recap
15	November 2	Detroit	W 5–0	Edmonton		Mrazek	16,389	9–4–2	20	Recap
16	November 4	Detroit	L 2–4	Winnipeg		Howard	15,004	9–5–2	20	Recap
17	November 7	Dallas	L 4–3	Detroit	OT	Howard	20,066	9–5–3	21	Recap
18	November 9	Tampa Bay	L 3–2	Detroit	OT	Howard	20,066	9–5–4	22	Recap
19	November 12	Winnipeg	L 3–2	Detroit	SO	Howard	20,066	9–5–5	23	Recap
20	November 15	Washington	L 4–3	Detroit	SO	Howard	20,066	9–5–6	24	Recap
21	November 16	Detroit	L 4–5	N.Y. Islanders	SO	Gustavsson	15,619	9–5–7	25	Recap
22	November 19	Nashville	L 2–0	Detroit		Howard	20,066	9–6–7	25	Recap
23	November 21	Carolina	W 3–4	Detroit		Howard	20,066	10–6–7	27	Recap
24	November 23	Ottawa	L 4–2	Detroit		Howard	20,066	10–7–7	27	Recap
25	November 24	Detroit	W 3–1	Buffalo		Gustavsson	18,721	11–7–7	29	Recap
26	November 27	Boston	W 1–6	Detroit		Gustavsson	20,066	12–7–7	31	Recap
27	November 29	Detroit	W 5–0	N.Y. Islanders		Howard	14,826	13–7–7	33	Recap

December: 5–7–2 (Home: 1–6–0; Road: 4–1–2)
#	Date	Visitor	Score	Home	OT	Decision	Attendance	Record	Pts	Recap
28	December 1	Detroit	W 4–2	Ottawa		Gustavsson	20,011	14–7–7	35	Recap
29	December 4	Philadelphia	L 6–3	Detroit		Howard	20,066	14–8–7	35	Recap
30	December 6	Detroit	W 3–1	New Jersey		Gustavsson	13,223	15–8–7	37	Recap
31	December 7	Florida	L 2–1	Detroit		Gustavsson	20,066	15–9–7	37	Recap
32	December 10	Detroit	L 3–2	Florida	SO	Howard	13,358	15–9–8	38	Recap
33	December 12	Detroit	L 1–2	Tampa Bay	SO	Gustavsson	19,204	15–9–9	39	Recap
34	December 14	Pittsburgh	L 4–1	Detroit		Gustavsson	20,066	15–10–9	39	Recap
35	December 15	Tampa Bay	L 3–0	Detroit		Mrazek	20,066	15–11–9	39	Recap
36	December 17	Anaheim	L 5–2	Detroit		Gustavsson	20,066	15–12–9	39	Recap
37	December 19	Calgary	W 2–3	Detroit	OT	Gustavsson	20,066	16–12–9	41	Recap
38	December 21	Detroit	W 5–4	Toronto	SO	Gustavsson	19,508	17–12–9	43	Recap
39	December 23	N.Y. Islanders	L 3–0	Detroit		Mrazek	20,066	17–13–9	43	Recap
40	December 28	Detroit	W 4–3	Florida		Gustavsson	18,932	18–13–9	45	Recap
41	December 30	Detroit	L 4–6	Nashville		Howard	17,212	18–14–9	45	Recap

January: 6–5–2 (Home: 4–1–2; Road: 2–4–0)
#	Date	Visitor	Score	Home	OT	Decision	Attendance	Record	Pts	Recap
42	January 1^{1}	Toronto	L 3–2	Detroit	SO	Howard	105,491	18–14–10	46	Recap
43	January 4	Detroit	W 5–1	Dallas		Howard	17,232	19–14–10	48	Recap
44	January 9	Detroit	L 1–4	San Jose		Howard	17,562	19–15–10	48	Recap
45	January 11	Detroit	W 3–1	Los Angeles		Howard	18,262	20–15–10	50	Recap
46	January 12	Detroit	L 0–1	Anaheim		Mrazek	17,375	20–16–10	50	Recap
47	January 16	Detroit	L 0–1	N.Y. Rangers		Howard	18,006	20–17–10	50	Recap
48	January 18	Los Angeles	W 2–3	Detroit	SO	Howard	20,066	21–17–10	52	Recap
49	January 20	St. Louis	L 4–1	Detroit		Howard	20,066	21–18–10	52	Recap
50	January 22	Chicago	W 4–5	Detroit	SO	Gustavsson	20,066	22–18–10	54	Recap
51	January 24	Montreal	W 1–4	Detroit		Gustavsson	20,066	23–18–10	56	Recap
52	January 26	Florida	L 5–4	Detroit	SO	Gustavsson	20,066	23–18–11	57	Recap
53	January 28	Detroit	L 0–5	Philadelphia		Gustavsson	19,987	23–19–11	57	Recap
54	January 31	Washington	W 3–4	Detroit	SO	Howard	20,066	24–19–11	59	Recap
2014 NHL Winter Classic, played at Michigan Stadium.

February: 4–1–1 (Home: 1–0–0; Road: 3–1–1)
#	Date	Visitor	Score	Home	OT	Decision	Attendance	Record	Pts	Recap
55	February 2	Detroit	L 5–6	Washington	OT	Howard	18,506	24–19–12	60	Recap
56	February 3	Vancouver	W 0–2	Detroit		Howard	20,066	25–19–12	62	Recap
57	February 6	Detroit	W 3–1	Florida		Howard	15,623	26–19–12	64	Recap
58	February 8	Detroit	L 2–4	Tampa Bay		Howard	19,204	26–20–12	64	Recap
59	February 26	Detroit	W 2–1	Montreal	OT	Howard	21,273	27–20–12	66	Recap
60	February 27	Detroit	W 6–1	Ottawa		Gustavsson	18,931	28–20–12	68	Recap

March: 7–6–2 (Home: 5–1–2; Road: 2–5–0)
#	Date	Visitor	Score	Home	OT	Decision	Attendance	Record	Pts	Recap
61	March 4	Detroit	L 3–4	New Jersey		Howard	16,592	28–21–12	68	Recap
62	March 6	Colorado	L 3–2	Detroit	OT	Howard	20,066	28–21–13	69	Recap
63	March 7	New Jersey	W 4–7	Detroit		Gustavsson	20,066	29–21–13	71	Recap
64	March 9	Detroit	L 0–3	N.Y. Rangers		Howard	18,006	29–22–13	71	Recap
65	March 11	Detroit	L 1–4	Columbus		Mrazek	14,330	29–23–13	71	Recap
66	March 14	Edmonton	W 1–2	Detroit	SO	Howard	20,066	30–23–13	73	Recap
67	March 16	Detroit	L 1–4	Chicago		Howard	22,128	30–24–13	73	Recap
68	March 18	Toronto	W 2–3	Detroit		Howard	20,066	31–24–13	75	Recap
69	March 20	Pittsburgh	W 4–5	Detroit	OT	Howard	20,066	32–24–13	77	Recap
70	March 22	Detroit	W 3–2	Minnesota		Howard	19,176	33–24–13	79	Recap
71	March 23	Minnesota	L 4–3	Detroit	OT	Howard	20,066	33–24–14	80	Recap
72	March 25	Detroit	L 2–4	Columbus		Howard	15,103	33–25–14	80	Recap
73	March 27	Montreal	L 5–4	Detroit		Howard	20,066	33–26–14	80	Recap
74	March 29	Detroit	W 4–2	Toronto		Howard	20,270	34–26–14	82	Recap
75	March 30	Tampa Bay	W 3–2	Detroit		Gustavsson	20,066	35–26–14	84	Recap

April: 4–2–1 (Home: 2–1–0; Road: 2–1–1)
#	Date	Visitor	Score	Home	OT	Decision	Attendance	Record	Pts	Recap
76	April 2	Boston	W 2–3	Detroit		Howard	20,066	36–26–14	86	Recap
77	April 4	Buffalo	W 2–3	Detroit		Howard	20.066	37–26–14	88	Recap
78	April 5	Detroit	L 3–5	Montreal		Gustavsson	21,273	37–27–14	88	Recap
79	April 8	Detroit	W 4–2	Buffalo		Howard	18,710	38–27–14	90	Recap
80	April 9	Detroit	L 3–4	Pittsburgh	SO	Gustavsson	18,620	38–27–15	91	Recap
81	April 11	Carolina	L 2–1	Detroit		Howard	20,066	38–28–15	91	Recap
82	April 13	Detroit	W 3–0	St. Louis		Mrazek	18,430	39–28–15	93	Recap

Legend: Win (2 points) Loss (0 points) Overtime/shootout loss (1 point)

== Playoffs ==
2014 Stanley Cup Playoffs

Eastern Conference First Round vs. (A1) Boston Bruins – Boston won series 4–1
#	Date	Visitor	Score	Home	OT	Decision	Attendance	Series	Recap
1	April 18	Detroit	1–0	Boston		Howard	17,565	1–0	Recap
2	April 20	Detroit	1–4	Boston		Howard	17,565	1–1	Recap
3	April 22	Boston	3–0	Detroit		Howard	20,066	1–2	Recap
4	April 24	Boston	3–2	Detroit	OT	Gustavsson	20,066	1–3	Recap
5	April 26	Detroit	2–4	Boston		Gustavsson	17,565	1–4	Recap

Legend: Win Loss

== Player statistics ==
Skaters

Regular season
Player	GP	G	A	Pts	+/−	PIM
Daniel Alfredsson	68	18	31	49	2	10
Niklas Kronwall	79	8	41	49	0	44
Gustav Nyquist	57	28	20	48	16	10
Henrik Zetterberg	45	16	32	48	19	20
Johan Franzen	54	16	25	41	6	40
Tomas Tatar	73	19	20	39	12	30
Pavel Datsyuk	45	17	20	37	1	6
Justin Abdelkader	70	10	18	28	2	31
Riley Sheahan	42	9	15	24	8	6
Danny DeKeyser	65	4	19	23	10	30
Darren Helm	42	12	8	20	2	14
Brendan Smith	71	5	14	19	−2	68
Jakub Kindl	66	2	17	19	−4	24
Joakim Andersson	65	8	9	17	−11	12
Todd Bertuzzi	59	9	7	16	−17	40
Tomas Jurco	36	8	7	15	0	14
Drew Miller	82	7	8	15	−11	21
Kyle Quincey	82	4	9	13	−5	88
David Legwand^{†}	21	4	7	11	−9	31
Jonathan Ericsson	48	1	10	11	2	34
Daniel Cleary	52	4	4	8	−11	31
Luke Glendening	56	1	6	7	−8	22
Brian Lashoff	75	1	5	6	−2	36
Patrick Eaves^{‡}	25	2	3	5	−4	2
Stephen Weiss	26	2	2	4	−4	12
Mikael Samuelsson	26	1	2	3	−4	6
Cory Emmerton	18	0	2	2	−2	4
Adam Almqvist	2	1	0	1	−1	0
Jordin Tootoo	11	0	1	1	−3	5
Landon Ferraro	4	0	0	0	0	2
Mitch Callahan	1	0	0	0	0	0
Teemu Pulkkinen	3	0	0	0	0	2
Alexey Marchenko	1	0	0	0	2	2
Xavier Ouellet	4	0	0	0	0	2
Ryan Sproul	1	0	0	0	0	0

Playoffs
Player	GP	G	A	Pts	+/−	PIM
Pavel Datsyuk	5	3	2	5	1	0
Henrik Zetterberg	2	1	1	2	1	0
Niklas Kronwall	5	1	1	2	−1	0
Johan Franzen	5	0	2	2	−2	2
Justin Abdelkader	5	0	2	2	1	6
Luke Glendening	5	1	0	1	−2	0
Drew Miller	5	0	1	1	−2	0
Darren Helm	5	0	1	1	−3	0
Todd Bertuzzi	1	0	0	0	0	2
Daniel Alfredsson	3	0	0	0	−1	2
David Legwand	5	0	0	0	−1	0
Kyle Quincey	5	0	0	0	0	2
Jakub Kindl	4	0	0	0	−2	2
Brendan Smith	5	0	0	0	1	8
Joakim Andersson	1	0	0	0	−1	0
Gustav Nyquist	5	0	0	0	−1	0
Brian Lashoff	5	0	0	0	−3	0
Tomas Tatar	5	0	0	0	−3	8
Riley Sheahan	5	0	0	0	−1	0
Tomas Jurco	3	0	0	0	−1	0
Xavier Ouellet	1	0	0	0	−1	0
Danny DeKeyser	5	0	0	0	−1	6

Goaltenders

Regular season
Player	GP	GS	TOI	W	L	OT	GA	GAA	SA	SV%	SO	G	A	PIM
Jimmy Howard	51	50	3004	21	19	11	133	2.66	1482	.910	2	0	0	6
Jonas Gustavsson	27	26	1551	16	5	4	68	2.63	735	.907	0	0	0	0
Petr Mrazek	9	6	449	2	4	0	13	1.74	178	.927	2	0	0	0

Goaltenders

Playoffs
Player	GP	GS	TOI	W	L	GA	GAA	SA	SV%	SO	G	A	PIM
Jimmy Howard	3	3	178	1	2	6	2.02	87	.931	1	0	0	0
Jonas Gustavsson	2	2	133	0	2	6	2.71	72	.917	0	0	0	0

^{†}Denotes player spent time with another team before joining the Red Wings. Stats reflect time with the Red Wings only.
^{‡}Traded mid-season
Bold/italics denotes franchise record

== Awards and honours ==
=== Awards ===
Regular season
Player	Award	Awarded
Jonas Gustavsson	NHL First Star of the Week	October 21, 2013
Niklas Kronwall	NHL Second Star of the Week	December 2, 2013
Gustav Nyquist	NHL Second Star of the Week	January 27, 2013
Johan Franzen	NHL First Star of the Week	March 3, 2014
Gustav Nyquist	NHL First Star of the Week	March 24, 2014
Gustav Nyquist	NHL Second Star of the Month	March

=== Milestones ===
Regular season
Player	Milestone	Reached
Luke Glendening	1st Career NHL Game	October 12, 2013
Kyle Quincey	300th Career NHL Game	October 14, 2013
Xavier Ouellet	1st Career NHL Game	October 21, 2013
Kyle Quincey	100th Career NHL Point	October 30, 2013
Mike Babcock	800th Career NHL Game	November 1, 2013
Niklas Kronwall	200th Career NHL Assist	November 1, 2013
Petr Mrazek	1st Career NHL Shutout	November 2, 2013
Stephen Weiss	250th Career NHL Assist	November 4, 2013
Adam Almqvist	1st Career NHL Game	November 4, 2013
Danny DeKeyser	1st Career NHL Goal	November 4, 2013
Adam Almqvist	1st Career NHL Goal; 1st Career NHL Point	November 7, 2013
Pavel Datsyuk	800th Career NHL Game	November 16, 2013
Henrik Zetterberg	700th Career NHL Point	November 24, 2013
Daniel Alfredsson	1,200th Career NHL Game	November 29, 2013
Daniel Cleary	900th Career NHL Game	December 10, 2013
Jonathan Ericsson	300th Career NHL Game	December 12, 2013
Tomas Jurco	1st Career NHL Game; 1st Career NHL Goal; 1st Career NHL Point	December 15, 2013
Luke Glendening	1st Career NHL Assist; 1st Career NHL Point	December 17, 2013
Daniel Alfredsson	700th Career NHL Assist	December 19, 2013
Jonas Gustavsson	50th career NHL Win	December 19, 2013
Alexey Marchenko	1st Career NHL Game	January 4, 2014
Riley Sheahan	1st Career NHL Goal	January 11, 2014
Justin Abdelkader	300th Career NHL Game	January 18, 2014
Mike Babcock	400th Career NHL Win with Detroit	January 18, 2014
Gustav Nyquist	1st Career NHL Hat Trick	February 2, 2014
Pavel Datsyuk	800th Career NHL Point	February 8, 2014
Joakim Andersson	100th Career NHL Game	March 7, 2014
Brendan Smith	100th Career NHL Game	March 7, 2014
Teemu Pulkkinen	1st Career NHL Game	March 14, 2014
Landon Ferraro	1st Career NHL Game	March 18, 2014
Todd Bertuzzi	300th Career NHL Game with Detroit	March 20, 2014
Jakub Kindl	200th Career NHL Game	March 20, 2014
Mitch Callahan	1st Career NHL Game	March 25, 2014
Darren Helm	1st Career NHL Hat Trick	March 29, 2014
Darren Helm	100th Career NHL Point	March 30, 2014
Brian Lashoff	100th Career NHL Game	April 2, 2014
Drew Miller	400th Career NHL Game	April 2, 2014
Jimmy Howard	150th Career NHL Win	April 2, 2014
Mike Babcock	700th Career NHL Game with Detroit	April 4, 2014
Luke Glendening	1st Career NHL Goal	April 5, 2014
Drew Miller	100th Career NHL Point	April 8, 2014
Ryan Sproul	1st Career NHL Game	April 13, 2014
Tomas Tatar	100th Career NHL Game	April 13, 2014

Playoffs
Player	Milestone	Reached
Luke Glendening	1st Career NHL Playoff Game	April 18, 2014
Tomas Jurco	1st Career NHL Playoff Game	April 18, 2014
Riley Sheahan	1st Career NHL Playoff Game	April 18, 2014
Luke Glendening	1st Career NHL Playoff Goal; 1st Career NHL Playoff Point	April 20, 2014
Justin Abdelkader	50th Career NHL Playoff Game	April 20, 2014
Drew Miller	50th Career NHL Playoff Game	April 20, 2014
David Legwand	50th Career NHL Playoff Game	April 22, 2014
Jonas Gustavsson	1st Career NHL Playoff Game	April 24, 2014
Xavier Ouellet	1st Career NHL Playoff Game	April 26, 2014

== Transactions ==
The Red Wings have been involved in the following transactions during the 2013–14 season.

=== Trades ===
Date	Details
June 30, 2013	To San Jose Sharks 1st-round pick (18th overall) in 2013 – Mirco Mueller	To Detroit Red Wings 1st-round pick (20th overall) in 2013 – Anthony Mantha; 2nd-round pick in 2013 – Tyler Bertuzzi
March 5, 2014	To Nashville Predators Patrick Eaves; Calle Jarnkrok; Conditional 3rd-round pick in 2014 (Note: Pick subsequently traded to San Jose Sharks.) – Julius Bergman	To Detroit Red Wings David Legwand

=== Free agents signed ===
Player	Former team	Contract terms	Ref
Daniel Alfredsson	Ottawa Senators	1 year, $5.5 million	
Stephen Weiss	Florida Panthers	5 years, $24.5 million	
Luke Glendening	Grand Rapids Griffins	1 year, $575,000 entry-level contract	
Colin Campbell	Lake Superior State University	2 years, $1.33 million entry-level contract	
Tomas Nosek	HC Pardubice	2 years, $1.85 million entry-level contract	

=== Free agents lost ===
Player	New team	Contract terms	Ref
Valtteri Filppula	Tampa Bay Lightning	5 years, $25 million	
Damien Brunner	New Jersey Devils	2 years, $5 million	
Carlo Colaiacovo	St. Louis Blues	1 year, $750,000	
Adam Almqvist	Severstal Cherepovets	2 years	

|}

=== Player signings ===
Player	Date	Contract terms	Ref
Brendan Smith	July 16, 2013	2 years, $2.525 million	
Joakim Andersson	August 6, 2013	2 years, $1.465 million	
Gustav Nyquist	August 20, 2013	2 years, $1.9 million	
Daniel Cleary	September 12, 2013	1 year, $1.75 million	
Jake Paterson	September 28, 2013	3 years, $1.9525 million entry-level contract	
Anthony Mantha	October 12, 2013	3 years, $2.775 million entry-level contract	
Zach Nastasiuk	November 1, 2013	3 years, $2.1025 million entry-level contract	
Jonathan Ericsson	November 27, 2013	6 years, $25.5 million contract extension	
Luke Glendening	April 5, 2014	3 years, $1.885 million contract extension	

== Draft picks ==
The Detroit Red Wings' picks at the 2013 NHL entry draft, held in Newark, New Jersey on June 30, 2013.

Round	#	Player	Pos	Nationality	College/Junior/Club team (League)
1	20	Anthony Mantha	RW	Canada	Val-d'Or Foreurs (QMJHL)
2	48	Zach Nastasiuk	RW	Canada	Owen Sound Attack (OHL)
2	58	Tyler Bertuzzi	LW	Canada	Guelph Storm (OHL)
3	79	Mattias Janmark-Nylen	C	Sweden	AIK IF (SHL)
4	109	David Pope	LW	Canada	West Kelowna Warriors (BCHL)
5	139	Mitchell Wheaton	D	Canada	Kelowna Rockets (WHL)
6	169	Marc McNulty	D	Canada	Prince George Cougars (WHL)
7	199	Hampus Melen	RW	Sweden	Tingsryds AIF (Division 1)

Draft notes

- The Detroit Red Wings' first-round pick went to the San Jose Sharks as the result of a trade on June 30, 2013, that sent a first-round pick in 2013 (20th overall) and Pittsburgh's second-round pick in 2013 (58th overall) to Detroit in exchange for this pick.
- The Pittsburgh Penguins second-round pick went to the Detroit Red Wings (via San Jose), San Jose traded this pick to Detroit as a result of a trade on June 30, 2013, that sent a first round pick in 2013 (18th overall) to San Jose in return for a first round pick in 2013 (20th overall) and this pick.
