= 2013–14 Tampa Bay Lightning season =

National Hockey League team season

2013–14 Tampa Bay Lightning
- Division: 2nd Atlantic
- Conference: 3rd Eastern
- 2013–14 record: 46–27–9
- Home record: 25–10–6
- Road record: 21–17–3
- Goals for: 240
- Goals against: 215

Team information
- General manager: Steve Yzerman
- Coach: Jon Cooper
- Captain: Martin St. Louis (Oct.–Mar.); Steven Stamkos (Mar.–Apr.)
- Alternate captains: Eric Brewer (Mar.–Apr.); Matt Carle; Steven Stamkos (Oct.–Mar.); Nate Thompson
- Arena: Tampa Bay Times Forum
- Average attendance: 18,612 (95.6%) (41 games)
- Minor league affiliates: Syracuse Crunch (AHL); Florida Everblades (ECHL); Brampton Beast (CHL)

Team leaders
- Goals: Martin St. Louis (29)
- Assists: Victor Hedman (42)
- Points: Martin St. Louis (61)
- Penalty minutes: Radko Gudas (152)
- Plus/minus: Ondrej Palat (+32)
- Wins: Ben Bishop (37)
- Goals against average: Ben Bishop (2.23)

The 2013–14 Tampa Bay Lightning season was the franchise's 22nd season in the National Hockey League (NHL).

== Standings ==
Atlantic Division
Pos	Team	GP	W	L	OTL	ROW	GF	GA	GD	Pts
1	p – Boston Bruins	82	54	19	9	51	261	177	+84	117
2	x – Tampa Bay Lightning	82	46	27	9	38	240	215	+25	101
3	x – Montreal Canadiens	82	46	28	8	40	215	204	+11	100
4	x – Detroit Red Wings	82	39	28	15	34	222	230	−8	93
5	Ottawa Senators	82	37	31	14	30	236	265	−29	88
6	Toronto Maple Leafs	82	38	36	8	29	231	256	−25	84
7	Florida Panthers	82	29	45	8	21	196	268	−72	66
8	Buffalo Sabres	82	21	51	10	14	157	248	−91	52

Source: National Hockey League
p – Clinched Presidents' Trophy; x – Clinched playoff spot

== Schedule and results ==
=== Preseason ===
2013 Preseason game log: 5–2–0 (home: 2–0–0; road: 1–2–0; Neutral: 2–0–0)

Game	Date	Opponent	Score	OT	Decision	Location	Attendance	Record	Recap
1	September 18	St. Louis Blues	4–3	SO	Gudlevskis	Amway Center		1–0–0	
2	September 19	Nashville Predators	5–1		Helenius	Tampa Bay Times Forum	10,332	2–0–0	
3	September 20	@ St. Louis Blues	4–3		Lindback	Scottrade Center	13,246	3–0–0	
4	September 21	Florida Panthers	5–4	SO	Bishop	Tampa Bay Times Forum	13,135	4–0–0	
5	September 24	@ Nashville Predators	1–2		Lindback	Bridgestone Arena	13,089	4–1–0	
6	September 26	Florida Panthers	3–2	OT	Bishop	Germain Arena		5–1–0	
7	September 28	@ Florida Panthers	3–5		Lindback	BB&T Center	12,547	5–2–0	

2013 Preseason Schedule
Lightning score listed first;

Win Loss Overtime/shootout loss

=== Regular season ===
2013–14 Game Log
October: 8–4–0, 16 Points (home: 5–2–0; road: 3–2–0)

Game	Date	Opponent	Score	OT	Decision	Location	Attendance	Record	Points	Recap
1	October 3	@ Boston Bruins	1–3		Lindback	TD Garden	17,565	0–1–0	0	
2	October 5	@ Chicago Blackhawks	3–2	SO	Bishop	United Center	21,563	1–1–0	2	
3	October 8	@ Buffalo Sabres	3–2	OT	Bishop	First Niagara Center	18,243	2–1–0	4	
4	October 10	Florida Panthers	7–2		Bishop	Tampa Bay Times Forum	19,204	3–1–0	6	
5	October 12	Pittsburgh Penguins	4–5		Lindback	Tampa Bay Times Forum	18,939	3–2–0	6	
6	October 15	Los Angeles Kings	5–1		Bishop	Tampa Bay Times Forum	16,310	4–2–0	8	
7	October 17	Minnesota Wild	3–1		Bishop	Tampa Bay Times Forum	16,454	5–2–0	10	
8	October 19	Boston Bruins	0–5		Bishop	Tampa Bay Times Forum	18,512	5–3–0	10	
9	October 24	Chicago Blackhawks	6–5	OT	Bishop	Tampa Bay Times Forum	18,820	6–3–0	12	
10	October 26	Buffalo Sabres	3–2		Bishop	Tampa Bay Times Forum	18,088	7–3–0	14	
11	October 27	@ Florida Panthers	4–3	SO	Lindback	BB&T Center	12,336	8–3–0	16	
12	October 29	@ New Jersey Devils	1–2		Bishop	Prudential Center	13,501	8–4–0	16	

November: 8–5–1, 17 Points (home: 5–1–0; road: 3–4–1)

Game	Date	Opponent	Score	OT	Decision	Location	Attendance	Record	Points	Recap
13	November 1	@ Carolina Hurricanes	3–0		Bishop	PNC Arena	14,828	9–4–0	18	
14	November 2	St. Louis Blues	4–2		Bishop	Tampa Bay Times Forum	18,885	10–4–0	20	
15	November 7	Edmonton Oilers	4–2		Bishop	Tampa Bay Times Forum	18,695	11–4–0	22	
16	November 9	@ Detroit Red Wings	3–2	OT	Bishop	Joe Louis Arena	20,066	12–4–0	24	
17	November 11	@ Boston Bruins	0–3		Lindback	TD Garden	17,565	12–5–0	24	
18	November 12	@ Montreal Canadiens	2–1	SO	Bishop	Bell Centre	21,273	13–5–0	26	
19	November 14	Anaheim Ducks	5–1		Bishop	Tampa Bay Times Forum	17,763	14–5–0	28	
20	November 16	@ Phoenix Coyotes	3–6		Bishop	Jobing.com Arena	12,562	14–6–0	28	
21	November 19	@ Los Angeles Kings	2–5		Bishop	Staples Center	18,118	14–7–0	28	
22	November 21	@ San Jose Sharks	1–5		Lindback	SAP Center at San Jose	17,562	14–8–0	28	
23	November 22	@ Anaheim Ducks	0–1	OT	Bishop	Honda Center	16,648	14–8–1	29	
24	November 25	New York Rangers	5–0		Bishop	Tampa Bay Times Forum	19,204	15–8–1	31	
25	November 27	Philadelphia Flyers	4–2		Lindback	Tampa Bay Times Forum	18,427	16–8–1	33	
26	November 29	Pittsburgh Penguins	0–3		Bishop	Tampa Bay Times Forum	19,065	16–9–1	33	

December: 7–3–3, 17 Points (home: 4–1–2; road: 3–2–1)

Game	Date	Opponent	Score	OT	Decision	Location	Attendance	Record	Points	Recap
27	December 3	@ Columbus Blue Jackets	0–1		Bishop	Nationwide Arena	10,223	16–10–1	33	
28	December 5	Ottawa Senators	3–1		Bishop	Tampa Bay Times Forum	16,562	17–10–1	35	
29	December 7	Winnipeg Jets	1–2	OT	Lindback	Tampa Bay Times Forum	18,354	17–10–2	36	
30	December 10	@ Washington Capitals	5–6	SO	Bishop	Verizon Center	18,506	17–10–3	37	
31	December 12	Detroit Red Wings	2–1	SO	Bishop	Tampa Bay Times Forum	19,204	18–10–3	39	
32	December 14	@ New Jersey Devils	0–3		Lindback	Prudential Center	13,832	18–11–3	39	
33	December 15	@ Detroit Red Wings	3–0		Bishop	Joe Louis Arena	20,066	19–11–3	41	
34	December 17	@ New York Islanders	3–2	SO	Bishop	Nassau Veterans Memorial Coliseum	13,618	20–11–3	43	
35	December 19	Nashville Predators	4–2		Lindback	Tampa Bay Times Forum	17,254	21–11–3	45	
36	December 21	Carolina Hurricanes	3–2	OT	Bishop	Tampa Bay Times Forum	19,204	22–11–3	47	
37	December 23	@ Florida Panthers	6–1		Bishop	BB&T Center	15,942	23–11–3	49	
38	December 28	Montreal Canadiens	1–2	SO	Bishop	Tampa Bay Times Forum	19,204	23–11–4	50	
39	December 29	New York Rangers	3–4		Lindback	Tampa Bay Times Forum	19,204	23–12–4	50	

January: 8–6–1, 17 Points (home: 2–2–1; road: 6–4–0)

Game	Date	Opponent	Score	OT	Decision	Location	Attendance	Record	Points	Recap
40	January 1	@ Vancouver Canucks	4–2		Bishop	Rogers Arena	18,910	24–12–4	52	
41	January 3	@ Calgary Flames	2–0		Bishop	Scotiabank Saddledome	19,289	25–12–4	54	
42	January 5	@ Edmonton Oilers	3–5		Lindback	Rexall Place	16,839	25–13–4	54	
43	January 7	@ Winnipeg Jets	4–2		Lindback	MTS Centre	15,004	26–13–4	56	
44	January 9	Washington Capitals	3–4		Lindback	Tampa Bay Times Forum	19,204	26–14–4	56	
45	January 11	@ Philadelphia Flyers	6–3		Lindback	Wells Fargo Center	19,987	27–14–4	58	
46	January 13	@ Columbus Blue Jackets	2–3		Lindback	Nationwide Arena	14,070	27–15–4	58	
47	January 14	@ New York Rangers	2–1		Bishop	Madison Square Garden	18,006	28–15–4	60	
48	January 16	New York Islanders	1–2	SO	Bishop	Tampa Bay Times Forum	18,333	28–15–5	61	
49	January 18	San Jose Sharks	4–5		Bishop	Tampa Bay Times Forum	19,204	28–16–5	61	
50	January 19	@ Carolina Hurricanes	5–3		Bishop	PNC Arena	16,760	29–16–5	63	
51	January 23	Ottawa Senators	4–3	SO	Bishop	Tampa Bay Times Forum	18,751	30–16–5	65	
52	January 25	Colorado Avalanche	5–2		Bishop	Tampa Bay Times Forum	19,204	31–16–5	67	
53	January 28	@ Toronto Maple Leafs	2–3		Bishop	Air Canada Centre	19,475	31–17–5	67	
54	January 30	@ Ottawa Senators	3–5		Bishop	Canadian Tire Centre	19,757	31–18–5	67	

February: 2–3–0, 4 Points (home: 1–1–0; road: 1–2–0)

Game	Date	Opponent	Score	OT	Decision	Location	Attendance	Record	Points	Recap
55	February 1	@ Montreal Canadiens	2–1	OT	Bishop	Bell Centre	21,273	32–18–5	69	
56	February 4	@ Minnesota Wild	1–2		Bishop	Xcel Energy Center	18,454	32–19–5	69	
57	February 6	Toronto Maple Leafs	1–4		Desjardins	Tampa Bay Times Forum	19,204	32–20–5	69	
58	February 8	Detroit Red Wings	4–2		Bishop	Tampa Bay Times Forum	19,204	33–20–5	71	
League-wide break for 2014 Winter Olympics (February 9–24)
59	February 27	@ Nashville Predators	2–3		Bishop	Bridgestone Arena	17,113	33–21–5	71	

March: 8–4–4, 20 Points (home: 4–1–3; road: 4–3–1)

Game	Date	Opponent	Score	OT	Decision	Location	Attendance	Record	Points	Recap
60	March 1	@ Dallas Stars	4–2		Bishop	American Airlines Center	15,897	34–21–5	73	
61	March 2	@ Colorado Avalanche	3–6		Bishop	Pepsi Center	15,592	34–22–5	73	
62	March 4	@ St. Louis Blues	2–4		Bishop	Scottrade Center	18,602	34–23–5	73	
63	March 6	Buffalo Sabres	1–3		Lindback	Tampa Bay Times Forum	19,204	34–24–5	73	
64	March 8	Boston Bruins	3–4	SO	Bishop	Tampa Bay Times Forum	19,204	34–24–6	74	
65	March 10	Phoenix Coyotes	3–4	SO	Bishop	Tampa Bay Times Forum	18,167	34–24–7	75	
66	March 13	Florida Panthers	5–4		Bishop	Tampa Bay Times Forum	18,324	35–24–7	77	
67	March 15	New Jersey Devils	3–0		Bishop	Tampa Bay Times Forum	19,204	36–24–7	79	
68	March 17	Vancouver Canucks	4–3		Bishop	Tampa Bay Times Forum	19,204	37–24–7	81	
69	March 19	@ Toronto Maple Leafs	5–3		Bishop	Air Canada Centre	19,585	38–24–7	83	
70	March 20	@ Ottawa Senators	5–4		Bishop	Canadian Tire Centre	17,136	39–24–7	85	
71	March 22	@ Pittsburgh Penguins	3–4	OT	Lindback	Consol Energy Center	16,668	39–24–8	86	
72	March 24	Ottawa Senators	3–4	SO	Bishop	Tampa Bay Times Forum	18,486	39–24–9	87	
73	March 27	New York Islanders	3–2	SO	Bishop	Tampa Bay Times Forum	18,554	40–24–9	89	
74	March 29	@ Buffalo Sabres	4–3	OT	Bishop	First Niagara Center	19,070	41–24–9	91	
75	March 30	@ Detroit Red Wings	2–3		Bishop	Joe Louis Arena	20,066	41–25–9	91	

April: 5–2–0, 10 Points (home: 4–2–0; road: 1–0–0)

Game	Date	Opponent	Score	OT	Decision	Location	Attendance	Record	Points	Recap
76	April 1	Montreal Canadiens	3–1		Bishop	Tampa Bay Times Forum	18,808	42–25–9	93	
77	April 3	Calgary Flames	1–4		Bishop	Tampa Bay Times Forum	17,495	42–26–9	93	
78	April 5	Dallas Stars	2–5		Bishop	Tampa Bay Times Forum	19,204	42–27–9	93	
79	April 8	Toronto Maple Leafs	3–0		Lindback	Tampa Bay Times Forum	18,896	43–27–9	95	
80	April 10	Philadelphia Flyers	4–2		Lindback	Tampa Bay Times Forum	19,204	44–27–9	97	
81	April 11	Columbus Blue Jackets	3–2		Gudlevskis	Tampa Bay Times Forum	18,686	45–27–9	99	
82	April 13	@ Washington Capitals	1–0	SO	Lindback	Verizon Center	18,506	46–27–9	101	

2013–14 Schedule
Lightning score listed first;

Win (2 Points) Loss (0 points) Overtime/shootout loss (1 point)

=== Playoffs ===
2014 Stanley Cup playoffs
Eastern Conference First Round vs. Montreal Canadiens (A3) – Montreal won series 4–0

Game	Date	Opponent	Score	OT	Decision	Location	Attendance	Series	Recap
1	April 16	Montreal Canadiens	4–5	18:08 OT	Lindback	Tampa Bay Times Forum	19,204	0–1	
2	April 18	Montreal Canadiens	1–4		Lindback	Tampa Bay Times Forum	19,204	0–2	
3	April 20	@ Montreal Canadiens	2–3		Lindback	Bell Centre	21,273	0–3	
4	April 22	@ Montreal Canadiens	3–4		Gudlevskis	Bell Centre	21,273	0–4	

Lightning score listed first;

Win Loss

== Player statistics ==
Final stats

Skaters

Regular season
Player	GP	G	A	Pts	+/−	PIM
Martin St. Louis^{‡}	62	29	32	61	12	6
Ondrej Palat	81	23	36	59	32	20
Valtteri Filppula	75	25	33	58	5	20
Victor Hedman	75	13	42	55	5	53
Tyler Johnson	82	24	26	50	23	26
Teddy Purcell	81	12	30	42	−3	14
Alex Killorn	82	17	24	41	8	63
Steven Stamkos	37	25	15	40	9	18
Matt Carle	82	2	29	31	11	28
Radko Gudas	73	3	19	22	2	152
J. T. Brown	63	4	15	19	−9	6
Nikita Kucherov	52	9	9	18	3	14
Sami Salo	71	4	13	17	11	18
Eric Brewer	77	4	13	17	10	59
Nate Thompson	81	9	7	16	3	27
Ryan Malone	57	5	10	15	−7	67
Richard Panik	50	3	10	13	−9	21
Ryan Callahan^{†}	20	6	5	11	4	8
Mark Barberio	49	5	5	10	10	28
B. J. Crombeen	55	3	7	10	−2	79
Michael Kostka	19	2	6	8	7	0
Andrej Sustr	43	1	7	8	3	16
Tom Pyatt	27	3	4	7	−2	4
Jean-Philippe Cote	19	0	4	4	0	22
Brett Connolly	11	1	0	1	−5	4
Keith Aulie	15	0	1	1	−3	9
Cedric Paquette	2	0	1	1	1	0
Dmitry Korobov	3	0	1	1	0	2
Pierre-Cedric Labrie	13	0	0	0	−4	20
Vladislav Namestnikov	4	0	0	0	−1	4
Cody Kunyk	1	0	0	0	0	0
Dana Tyrell^{‡}	7	0	0	0	0	4
Matt Taormina^{‡}	7	0	0	0	0	0

Playoffs
Player	GP	G	A	Pts	+/−	PIM
Steven Stamkos	4	2	2	4	1	6
Ondrej Palat	3	2	1	3	1	0
Victor Hedman	4	1	2	3	−2	2
Alex Killorn	4	1	1	2	−2	4
Tyler Johnson	4	1	1	2	−2	0
Mike Kostka	3	0	2	2	2	0
J. T. Brown	4	0	2	2	−3	0
Cedric Paquette	4	0	2	2	−2	16
Nikita Kucherov	2	1	0	1	0	0
Matt Carle	4	1	0	1	−3	0
Teddy Purcell	4	1	0	1	−2	0
Valtteri Filppula	4	0	1	1	−4	0
Radko Gudas	3	0	1	1	−1	9
Sami Salo	2	0	0	0	−2	0
Eric Brewer	4	0	0	0	−2	0
B. J. Crombeen	2	0	0	0	−1	0
Nate Thompson	4	0	0	0	−1	0
Ryan Callahan	4	0	0	0	−2	0
Tom Pyatt	1	0	0	0	0	0
Keith Aulie	1	0	0	0	1	0
Mark Barberio	2	0	0	0	−2	6
Richard Panik	2	0	0	0	−2	4
Andrej Sustr	3	0	0	0	−3	2

Goaltenders

Regular season
Player	GP	GS	TOI	W	L	OT	GA	GAA	SA	SV%	SO	G	A	PIM
Ben Bishop	63	63	3586	37	14	7	133	2.23	1758	.924	5	0	2	4
Anders Lindback	23	18	1302	8	12	2	63	2.90	580	.891	1	0	0	2
Kristers Gudlevskis	1	1	60	1	0	0	2	2.01	38	.947	0	0	0	0
Cedrick Desjardins	1	0	18	0	1	0	2	6.65	13	.846	0	0	0	2

Playoffs
Player	GP	GS	TOI	W	L	GA	GAA	SA	SV%	SO	G	A	PIM
Anders Lindback	4	3	215	0	3	14	3.92	118	.881	0	0	0	0
Kristers Gudlevskis	2	1	40	0	1	2	3.02	20	.900	0	0	0	0

^{†}Denotes player spent time with another team before joining Tampa Bay. Stats reflect time with Tampa Bay only.
^{‡}Traded from Tampa Bay mid-season.
Bold/italics denotes franchise record

== Awards and honours ==
=== Milestones ===
Regular season
Player	Milestone	Reached
Andrej Sustr	1st career NHL assist 1st career NHL point	October 15, 2013
Steven Stamkos	400th career NHL point	October 24, 2013
Eric Brewer	900th career NHL game	October 29, 2013
Mark Barberio	1st career NHL assist 1st career NHL point	November 2, 2013
Ryan Malone	600th career NHL game	November 9, 2013
Valtteri Filppula	500th career NHL game	November 11, 2013
J. T. Brown	1st career NHL goal	November 16, 2013
Martin St. Louis	1,000th career NHL game	November 19, 2013
Dmitry Korobov	1st career NHL game	November 19, 2013
Victor Hedman	100th career NHL point	November 19, 2013
Nikita Kucherov	1st career NHL game 1st career NHL goal 1st career NHL point	November 25, 2013
Teddy Purcell	200th career NHL point	November 25, 2013
Jean-Philippe Cote	1st career NHL assist 1st career NHL point	December 19, 2013
Nikita Kucherov	1st career NHL assist	December 23, 2013
Dmitry Korobov	1st career NHL assist 1st career NHL point	December 29, 2013
Matt Carle	200th career NHL assist	January 1, 2014
Victor Hedman	300th career NHL game	January 16, 2014
Mark Barberio	1st career NHL goal	January 18, 2014
Martin St. Louis	600th career NHL assist	January 30, 2014
Vladislav Namestnikov	1st career NHL game	February 8, 2014
Victor Hedman	100th career NHL assist	March 1, 2014
Alex Killorn	100th career NHL game	March 4, 2014
Valtteri Filppula	300th career NHL point	March 19, 2014
Steven Stamkos	400th career NHL game	March 24, 2014
Andrej Sustr	1st career NHL goal	April 5, 2014
Teddy Purcell	400th career NHL game	April 10, 2014
Kristers Gudlevskis	1st career NHL game	April 11, 2014
Matt Carle	600th career NHL game	April 11, 2014
Cedric Paquette	1st career NHL game 1st career NHL assist 1st career NHL point	April 11, 2014
Cody Kunyk	1st career NHL game	April 13, 2014

== Transactions ==
The Lightning have been involved in the following transactions during the 2013–14 season.

=== Trades ===
July 2, 2013	To Columbus Blue Jackets Future considerations	To Tampa Bay Lightning Drew Olson
March 5, 2014	To New York Rangers: Martin St. Louis; Conditional 2nd-round pick in 2015 (Note: Pick subsequently traded to Phoenix Coyotes, then to Calgary Flames.) – Oliver Kylington	To Tampa Bay Lightning: Ryan Callahan; Conditional 2nd-round pick in 2014 (Note: Pick converted to a 1st-round pick after condition satisfied; pick subsequently traded to New York Islanders) – Josh Ho-Sang; 1st-round pick in 2015 (Note: Pick subsequently traded to New York Islanders.) – Anthony Beauvillier; Conditional 7th-round pick in 2015 (Note: Condition satisfied; pick subsequently traded back to New York Rangers, then to Edmonton Oilers.) – Ziyat Paigin
March 5, 2014	To Columbus Blue Jackets Dana Tyrell; Matt Taormina	To Tampa Bay Lightning Jonathan Marchessault; Dalton Smith

=== Free agents signed ===
Player	Former team	Contract terms
Geoff Walker	Lake Erie Monsters	1 year, $575,000
Valtteri Filppula	Detroit Red Wings	5 years, $25 million
Jean-Philippe Cote	Syracuse Crunch	2 years, $1.1 million
Yanni Gourde	Worcester Sharks	2 years, 1.175 million entry-level contract
Cody Kunyk	University of Alaska Fairbanks	1 year, $925,000 entry-level contract

=== Free agents lost ===
Player	New team	Contract terms
Vincent Lecavalier	Philadelphia Flyers	5 year, $22.5 million
J. T. Wyman	Colorado Avalanche	1 year, $750,000
Benoit Pouliot	New York Rangers	1 year, $1.3 million
Brendan Mikkelson	Pittsburgh Penguins	1 year, $550,000

=== Claimed via waivers ===
Player	Previous team	Date
Mike Kostka	Chicago Blackhawks	February 23, 2014

=== Lost via waivers ===
Player	New team	Date

=== Lost via retirement ===
Player

=== Player signings ===
Player	Date	Contract terms
Pierre-Cedric Labrie	July 1, 2013	1 year, $625,000
Cedrick Desjardins	July 3, 2013	1 year, $650,000
Matt Taormina	July 3, 2013	1 year, $650,000
Jonathan Drouin	July 5, 2013	3 years, $2.775 million entry-level contract
J. T. Brown	July 15, 2013	1 year, $874,125
Mark Barberio	July 16, 2013	1 year, $605,000
Kristers Gudlevskis	August 3, 2013	3 years, $1.835 million entry-level contract
Joel Vermin	September 17, 2013	3 years, $1.8 million entry-level contract
Adam Erne	April 1, 2014	3 years, $2.715 million entry-level contract
Henri Ikonen	April 6, 2014	3 years, $1.85 million entry-level contract
Jake Dotchin	April 19, 2014	3 years, 1.85 million entry-level contract
Andrei Vasilevskiy	May 6, 2014	3 years, $4.425 million entry-level contract
Dylan Blujus	May 21, 2014	3 years, $2.775 million entry-level contract
Tyler Johnson	May 23, 2014	3 years, $10 million contract extension
Ondrej Palat	June 9, 2014	3 years, $10 million contract extension
Alex Killorn	June 19, 2014	2 years, $5.1 million
Ryan Callahan	June 25, 2014	6 years, $34.8 million
J. T. Brown	June 26, 2014	2 years, $1.9 million

== Draft picks ==
Tampa Bay Lightning's picks at the 2013 NHL entry draft, which was held in Newark, New Jersey on June 30, 2013.

Round	#	Player	Pos	Nationality	College/Junior/Club team (League)
1	3	Jonathan Drouin	Left wing	Canada	Halifax Mooseheads (QMJHL)
2	33	Adam Erne	Left wing	United States	Quebec Remparts (QMJHL)
5	124	Kristers Gudlevskis	Goaltender	Latvia	Dinamo Riga (KHL)
6	154	Henri Ikonen	Left wing	Finland	Kingston Frontenacs (OHL)
7	184	Saku Salminen	Forward	Finland	Jokerit (SM-liiga)
7	186^{[a]}	Joel Vermin	Forward	Switzerland	SC Bern (NLA)

Draft notes

- The Tampa Bay Lightning's third-round pick went to the Nashville Predators as the result of a June 15, 2012, trade that sent Anders Lindback, Kyle Wilson and a 2012 seventh-round pick (#202–Nikita Gusev) to the Lightning in exchange for Sebastien Caron, two 2012 second-round picks (#37–Pontus Aberg, #50–Colton Sissons) and this pick.
- The Tampa Bay Lightning's fourth-round pick went to the Edmonton Oilers (via St. Louis), Tampa Bay traded this pick to the St. Louis Blues as the result of a July 10, 2012, trade that sent B. J. Crombeen and a 2014 fifth-round pick to the Lightning in exchange a 2014 fourth-round pick and this pick.
- ^{a} The Carolina Hurricanes' seventh-round pick went to the Tampa Bay Lightning as a result of an April 2, 2013, trade that sent Marc-Andre Bergeron to the Hurricanes in exchange for Adam Hall and this pick.
