= 2013–14 Boston Bruins season =

NHL team season

2013–14 Boston Bruins
- Presidents' Trophy winners
- Atlantic Division champions
- Division: 1st Atlantic
- Conference: 1st Eastern
- 2013–14 record: 54–19–9
- Home record: 31–7–3
- Road record: 23–12–6
- Goals for: 261
- Goals against: 177

Team information
- General manager: Peter Chiarelli
- Coach: Claude Julien
- Captain: Zdeno Chara
- Alternate captains: Patrice Bergeron; Chris Kelly; David Krejci
- Arena: TD Garden
- Minor league affiliates: Providence Bruins (AHL); South Carolina Stingrays (ECHL)

Team leaders
- Goals: Patrice Bergeron; Jarome Iginla (30)
- Assists: David Krejci (50)
- Points: David Krejci (69)
- Penalty minutes: Milan Lucic (91)
- Plus/minus: David Krejci (39)
- Wins: Tuukka Rask (36)
- Goals against average: Niklas Svedberg (1.97)

The 2013–14 Boston Bruins season was their 90th season for the National Hockey League (NHL) franchise that was established on November 1, 1924. The team finished with the most points in the league, securing the Presidents' Trophy. In the playoffs, they defeated the Detroit Red Wings in five games, but in the second round lost to their bitter rivals, the Montreal Canadiens, in seven games.

== Standings ==
Atlantic Division
Pos	Team	GP	W	L	OTL	ROW	GF	GA	GD	Pts
1	p – Boston Bruins	82	54	19	9	51	261	177	+84	117
2	x – Tampa Bay Lightning	82	46	27	9	38	240	215	+25	101
3	x – Montreal Canadiens	82	46	28	8	40	215	204	+11	100
4	x – Detroit Red Wings	82	39	28	15	34	222	230	−8	93
5	Ottawa Senators	82	37	31	14	30	236	265	−29	88
6	Toronto Maple Leafs	82	38	36	8	29	231	256	−25	84
7	Florida Panthers	82	29	45	8	21	196	268	−72	66
8	Buffalo Sabres	82	21	51	10	14	157	248	−91	52

Source: National Hockey League
p – Clinched Presidents' Trophy; x – Clinched playoff spot

== Schedule and results ==
=== Preseason ===
2013 Pre-season
#	Date	Visitor	Score	Home	OT	Decision	Attendance	Record	Recap
1	September 16	Boston Bruins	6–3	Montreal Canadiens		Malcolm Subban	21,273	1–0–0
2	September 17	Boston Bruins	3–2	Washington Capitals^{1}	SO	Niklas Svedberg	11,286	2–0–0
3	September 19	Detroit Red Wings	8–2	Boston Bruins		Malcolm Subban	16,839	2–1–0
4	September 21	Boston Bruins	2–0	Detroit Red Wings		Chad Johnson	15,516	3–1–0
5	September 23	Washington Capitals	2–3	Boston Bruins	OT	Tuukka Rask	17,006	4–1–0
6	September 26	Boston Bruins	3–2	Winnipeg Jets	OT	Niklas Svedberg	15,004	5–1–0
7	September 27	Winnipeg Jets	0–5	Boston Bruins^{2}		Tuukka Rask	12,500	6–1–0
Game was played at 1st Mariner Arena in Baltimore, Maryland.; Game was played at Credit Union Centre in Saskatoon, Saskatchewan.

=== Regular season ===
2013–14 Game Log

October: 8–4–0 (Home: 4–3–0; Road: 4–1–0)
#	Date	Visitor	Score	Home	OT	Decision	Attendance	Record	Pts	Recap
1	October 3	Tampa Bay Lightning	1–3	Boston Bruins		Tuukka Rask	17,565	1–0–0	2
2	October 5	Detroit Red Wings	1–4	Boston Bruins		Tuukka Rask	17,565	2–0–0	4
3	October 10	Colorado Avalanche	2–0	Boston Bruins		Tuukka Rask	17,565	2–1–0	4
4	October 12	Boston Bruins	3–1	Columbus Blue Jackets		Tuukka Rask	14,092	3–1–0	6
5	October 14	Detroit Red Wings	3–2	Boston Bruins		Tuukka Rask	17,565	3–2–0	6
6	October 17	Boston Bruins	3–2	Florida Panthers		Tuukka Rask	14,440	4–2–0	8
7	October 19	Boston Bruins	5–0	Tampa Bay Lightning		Tuukka Rask	18,512	5–2–0	10
8	October 23	Boston Bruins	5–2	Buffalo Sabres		Chad Johnson	17,645	6–2–0	12
9	October 24	San Jose Sharks	1–2	Boston Bruins		Tuukka Rask	17,565	7–2–0	14
10	October 26	New Jersey Devils	4–3	Boston Bruins		Tuukka Rask	17,565	7–3–0	14
11	October 30	Boston Bruins	2–3	Pittsburgh Penguins		Tuukka Rask	18,627	7–4–0	14
12	October 31	Anaheim Ducks	2–3	Boston Bruins	SO	Tuukka Rask	17,565	8–4–0	16

November: 10–3–2 (Home: 8–0–2; Road: 2–3–0)
#	Date	Visitor	Score	Home	OT	Decision	Attendance	Record	Pts	Recap
13	November 2	Boston Bruins	1–3	New York Islanders		Chad Johnson	14,018	8–5–0	16
14	November 5	Dallas Stars	3–2	Boston Bruins	SO	Tuukka Rask	17,565	8–5–1	17
15	November 7	Florida Panthers	1–4	Boston Bruins		Tuukka Rask	17,565	9–5–1	19
16	November 9	Toronto Maple Leafs	1–3	Boston Bruins		Tuukka Rask	17,565	10–5–1	21
17	November 11	Tampa Bay Lightning	0–3	Boston Bruins		Tuukka Rask	17,565	11–5–1	23
18	November 14	Columbus Blue Jackets	2–3	Boston Bruins	OT	Chad Johnson	17,565	12–5–1	25
19	November 15	Boston Bruins	2–4	Ottawa Senators		Tuukka Rask	19,538	12–6–1	25
20	November 18	Boston Bruins	4–1	Carolina Hurricanes		Tuukka Rask	13,919	13–6–1	27
21	November 19	Boston Bruins	2–1	New York Rangers		Tuukka Rask	18,006	14–6–1	29
22	November 21	St. Louis Blues	3–2	Boston Bruins	SO	Tuukka Rask	17,565	14–6–2	30
23	November 23	Carolina Hurricanes	2–3	Boston Bruins	OT	Chad Johnson	17,565	15–6–2	32
24	November 25	Pittsburgh Penguins	3–4	Boston Bruins	OT	Tuukka Rask	17,565	16–6–2	34
25	November 27	Boston Bruins	1–6	Detroit Red Wings		Tuukka Rask	20,066	16–7–2	34
26	November 29	New York Rangers	2–3	Boston Bruins		Tuukka Rask	17,565	17–7–2	36
27	November 30	Columbus Blue Jackets	1–3	Boston Bruins		Chad Johnson	17,565	18–7–2	38

December: 8–5–0 (Home: 4–1–0; Road: 4–4–0)
#	Date	Visitor	Score	Home	OT	Decision	Attendance	Record	Pts	Recap
28	December 5	Boston Bruins	1–2	Montreal Canadiens		Tuukka Rask	21,273	18–8–2	38
29	December 7	Pittsburgh Penguins	2–3	Boston Bruins		Tuukka Rask	17,565	19–8–2	40
30	December 8	Boston Bruins	5–2	Toronto Maple Leafs		Chad Johnson	19,165	20–8–2	42
31	December 10	Boston Bruins	2–1	Calgary Flames		Tuukka Rask	19,289	21–8–2	44
32	December 12	Boston Bruins	4–2	Edmonton Oilers		Chad Johnson	16,839	22–8–2	46
33	December 14	Boston Bruins	2–6	Vancouver Canucks		Tuukka Rask	18,910	22–9–2	46
34	December 17	Calgary Flames	0–2	Boston Bruins		Tuukka Rask	17,565	23–9–2	48
35	December 19	Boston Bruins	2–4	Buffalo Sabres		Chad Johnson	18,217	23–10–2	48
36	December 21	Buffalo Sabres	1–4	Boston Bruins		Tuukka Rask	17,565	24–10–2	50
37	December 23	Boston Bruins	6–2	Nashville Predators		Tuukka Rask	17,207	25–10–2	52
38	December 27	Ottawa Senators	0–5	Boston Bruins		Tuukka Rask	17,565	26–10–2	54
39	December 28	Boston Bruins	3–4	Ottawa Senators		Chad Johnson	20,500	26–11–2	54
40	December 31	New York Islanders	5–3	Boston Bruins		Tuukka Rask	17,565	26–12–2	54

January: 8–4–1 (Home: 4–2–0; Road: 4–2–1)
#	Date	Visitor	Score	Home	OT	Decision	Attendance	Record	Pts	Recap
41	January 2	Nashville Predators	2–3	Boston Bruins	OT	Niklas Svedberg	17,565	27–12–2	56
42	January 4	Winnipeg Jets	1–4	Boston Bruins		Tuukka Rask	17,565	28–12–2	58
43	January 7	Boston Bruins	2–5	Anaheim Ducks		Tuukka Rask	17,238	28–13–2	58
44	January 9	Boston Bruins	2–4	Los Angeles Kings		Tuukka Rask	18,118	28–14–2	58
45	January 11	Boston Bruins	1–0	San Jose Sharks		Tuukka Rask	17,562	29–14–2	60
46	January 14	Toronto Maple Leafs	4–3	Boston Bruins		Tuukka Rask	17,565	29–15–2	60
47	January 16	Boston Bruins	4–2	Dallas Stars		Chad Johnson	16,890	30–15–2	62
48	January 19	Boston Bruins	2–3	Chicago Blackhawks	SO	Tuukka Rask	22,197	30–15–3	63
49	January 20	Los Angeles Kings	2–3	Boston Bruins		Chad Johnson	17,565	31–15–3	65
50	January 25	Boston Bruins	6–1	Philadelphia Flyers		Tuukka Rask	19,938	32–15–3	67
51	January 27	Boston Bruins	6–3	New York Islanders		Chad Johnson	13,819	33–15–3	69
52	January 28	Florida Panthers	2–6	Boston Bruins		Tuukka Rask	17,565	34–15–3	71
53	January 30	Montreal Canadiens	4–1	Boston Bruins		Tuukka Rask	17,565	34–16–3	71

February: 3–0–2 (Home: 3–0–0; Road: 0–0–2)
#	Date	Visitor	Score	Home	OT	Decision	Attendance	Record	Pts	Recap
54	February 1	Edmonton Oilers	0–4	Boston Bruins		Chad Johnson	17,565	35–16–3	73
55	February 4	Vancouver Canucks	1–3	Boston Bruins		Tuukka Rask	17,565	36–16–3	75
56	February 6	Boston Bruins	2–3	St. Louis Blues	OT	Tuukka Rask	19,671	36–16–4	76
57	February 8	Ottawa Senators	2–7	Boston Bruins		Chad Johnson	17,565	37–16–4	78
58	February 26	Boston Bruins	4–5	Buffalo Sabres	OT	Chad Johnson	19,070	37–16–5	79

March: 15–1–1 (Home: 6–1–1; Road: 9–0–0)
#	Date	Visitor	Score	Home	OT	Decision	Attendance	Record	Pts	Recap
59	March 1	Washington Capitals	4–2	Boston Bruins		Tuukka Rask	17,565	37–17–5	79
60	March 2	Boston Bruins	6–3	New York Rangers		Tuukka Rask	18,006	38–17–5	81
61	March 4	Florida Panthers	1–4	Boston Bruins		Chad Johnson	17,565	39–17–5	83
62	March 6	Washington Capitals	0–3	Boston Bruins		Tuukka Rask	17,565	40–17–5	85
63	March 8	Boston Bruins	4–3	Tampa Bay Lightning	SO	Tuukka Rask	19,204	41–17–5	87
64	March 9	Boston Bruins	5–2	Florida Panthers		Chad Johnson	18,858	42–17–5	89
65	March 12	Boston Bruins	4–1	Montreal Canadiens		Tuukka Rask	21,273	43–17–5	91
66	March 13	Phoenix Coyotes	1–2	Boston Bruins		Tuukka Rask	17,565	44–17–5	93
67	March 15	Carolina Hurricanes	1–5	Boston Bruins		Chad Johnson	17,565	45–17–5	95
68	March 17	Minnesota Wild	1–4	Boston Bruins		Tuukka Rask	17,565	46–17–5	97
69	March 18	Boston Bruins	4–2	New Jersey Devils		Chad Johnson	16,138	47–17–5	99
70	March 21	Boston Bruins	2–0	Colorado Avalanche		Chad Johnson	18,007	48–17–5	101
71	March 22	Boston Bruins	4–2	Phoenix Coyotes		Tuukka Rask	17,468	49–17–5	103
72	March 24	Montreal Canadiens	2–1	Boston Bruins	SO	Tuukka Rask	17,565	49–17–6	104
73	March 27	Chicago Blackhawks	0–3	Boston Bruins		Tuukka Rask	17,565	50–17–6	106
74	March 29	Boston Bruins	4–2	Washington Capitals		Chad Johnson	18,506	51–17–6	108
75	March 30	Boston Bruins	4–3	Philadelphia Flyers	SO	Tuukka Rask	19,958	52–17–6	110

April: 2–2–3 (Home: 2–0–0; Road: 0–2–3)
#	Date	Visitor	Score	Home	OT	Decision	Attendance	Record	Pts	Recap
76	April 2	Boston Bruins	2–3	Detroit Red Wings		Tuukka Rask	20,066	52–18–6	110
77	April 3	Boston Bruins	3–4	Toronto Maple Leafs	OT	Chad Johnson	19,609	52–18–7	111
78	April 5	Philadelphia Flyers	2–5	Boston Bruins		Tuukka Rask	17,565	53–18–7	113
79	April 8	Boston Bruins	3–4	Minnesota Wild	SO	Tuukka Rask	18,893	53–18–8	114
80	April 10	Boston Bruins	1–2	Winnipeg Jets	SO	Chad Johnson	15,004	53–18–9	115
81	April 12	Buffalo Sabres	1–4	Boston Bruins		Tuukka Rask	17,565	54–18–9	117
82	April 13	Boston Bruins	2–3	New Jersey Devils		Chad Johnson	16,592	54–19–9	117

Legend: Win (2 points) Loss (0 points) Overtime/shootout loss (1 point)

== Playoffs ==
The Boston Bruins earned the Presidents' Trophy by finishing the regular season with the league's best record. They faced the Detroit Red Wings in the first round and won the series 4–1. They advanced to the second round where they were defeated 3–4 by the Montreal Canadiens, and eliminated from the Stanley Cup Playoffs.

2014 Stanley Cup Playoffs

Eastern Conference First Round vs WC2 Detroit Red Wings: 4–1 (Home: 2–1; Road: 2–0)
#	Date	Visitor	Score	Home	OT	Boston goals	Detroit goals	Decision	Attendance	Series	Recap
1	April 18	Detroit Red Wings	1–0	Boston Bruins			Datsyuk	Rask	17,565	0–1
2	April 20	Detroit Red Wings	1–4	Boston Bruins		Florek, Smith, Lucic, Chara	Glendening	Rask	17,565	1–1
3	April 22	Boston Bruins	3–0	Detroit Red Wings		Hamilton, Caron, Bergeron		Rask	20,066	2–1
4	April 24	Boston Bruins	3–2	Detroit Red Wings	13:32	Krug, Lucic, Iginla	Kronwall, Datsyuk	Rask	20,066	3–1
5	April 26	Detroit Red Wings	2–4	Boston Bruins		Eriksson, Chara, Lucic, Iginla	Datsyuk, Zetterberg	Rask	17,565	4–1

Eastern Conference Second Round vs A3 Montreal Canadiens: 3–4 (Home: 2–2; Road: 1–2)
#	Date	Visitor	Score	Home	OT	Boston goals	Montreal goals	Decision	Attendance	Series	Recap
1	May 1	Montreal Canadiens	4–3	Boston Bruins	24:17	Smith, Krug, Boychuk	Subban (2), Bourque, Bouillon	Rask	17,565	0–1
2	May 3	Montreal Canadiens	3–5	Boston Bruins		Paille, Hamilton, Bergeron, Smith, Lucic	Weaver, Vanek (2)	Rask	17,565	1–1
3	May 6	Boston Bruins	2–4	Montreal Canadiens		Bergeron, Iginla	Plekanec, Subban, Weise, Eller	Rask	21,273	1–2
4	May 8	Boston Bruins	1–0	Montreal Canadiens	1:19	Fraser		Rask	21,273	2–2
5	May 10	Montreal Canadiens	2–4	Boston Bruins		Soderberg, Smith, Iginla, Eriksson	Gallagher, Subban	Rask	17,565	3–2
6	May 12	Boston Bruins	0–4	Montreal Canadiens			Eller, Pacioretty, Vanek (2)	Rask	21,273	3–3
7	May 14	Montreal Canadiens	3–1	Boston Bruins		Iginla	Weise, Pacioretty, Briere	Rask	17,565	3–4

- Scorer of game-winning goal in italics

== Player stats ==
Final Stats

Skaters

Regular season
Player	GP	G	A	Pts	+/−	PIM
David Krejci	80	19	50	69	39	28
Patrice Bergeron	80	30	32	62	38	43
Jarome Iginla	78	30	31	61	34	47
Milan Lucic	80	24	35	59	30	91
Brad Marchand	82	25	28	53	36	64
Reilly Smith	82	20	31	51	28	14
Carl Soderberg	73	16	32	48	4	36
Zdeno Chara	77	17	23	40	25	66
Torey Krug	79	14	26	40	18	28
Loui Eriksson	61	10	27	37	14	6
Dougie Hamilton	64	7	18	25	22	40
Johnny Boychuk	75	5	18	23	31	45
Gregory Campbell	82	8	13	21	1	47
Chris Kelly	57	9	9	18	2	32
Daniel Paille	72	9	9	18	9	6
Matt Bartkowski	64	0	18	18	22	30
Ryan Spooner	23	0	11	11	0	6
Dennis Seidenberg	34	1	9	10	11	10
Shawn Thornton	64	5	3	8	3	74
Adam McQuaid	30	1	5	6	12	69
Kevan Miller	47	1	5	6	20	38
Andrej Meszaros^{†}	14	2	3	5	4	6
Jordan Caron	35	1	2	3	−8	36
Matt Fraser	14	2	0	2	0	10
David Warsofsky	6	1	1	2	1	0
Justin Florek	4	1	1	2	1	0
Corey Potter^{†}	3	0	0	0	−1	0
Nick Johnson	9	0	0	0	−4	0
Craig Cunningham	2	0	0	0	0	0
Zach Trotman	2	0	0	0	0	0
Alexander Khokhlachev	1	0	0	0	0	2
Matt Lindblad	2	0	0	0	0	0

Playoffs
Player	GP	G	A	Pts	+/−	PIM
Torey Krug	12	2	8	10	−2	6
Patrice Bergeron	12	3	6	9	1	4
Jarome Iginla	12	5	2	7	0	12
Milan Lucic	12	4	3	7	3	4
Dougie Hamilton	12	2	5	7	1	14
Carl Soderberg	12	1	5	6	4	2
Reilly Smith	12	4	1	5	5	0
Loui Eriksson	12	2	3	5	1	4
Brad Marchand	12	0	5	5	4	18
Zdeno Chara	12	2	2	4	4	14
David Krejci	12	0	4	4	−3	4
Johnny Boychuk	12	1	1	2	3	2
Matt Fraser	4	1	1	2	2	0
Andrej Meszaros	4	0	2	2	1	2
Kevan Miller	11	0	2	2	2	8
Daniel Paille	7	1	0	1	−1	2
Jordan Caron	7	1	0	1	0	4
Justin Florek	6	1	0	1	0	4
Shawn Thornton	12	0	1	1	−2	4
Matt Bartkowski	8	0	1	1	2	10
Gregory Campbell	12	0	0	0	0	4
Corey Potter	1	0	0	0	0	0

- ^{†}Denotes player spent time with another team before joining Bruins. Stats reflect time with the Bruins only.
- ^{‡}Denotes player was traded mid-season. Stats reflect time with the Bruins only.
- ^{(G)}Denotes goaltender.

Goaltenders

Regular season
Player	GP	GS	TOI	W	L	OT	GA	GAA	SA	SV%	SO
Tuukka Rask	58	58	3386	36	15	6	115	2.04	1641	0.930	7
Chad Johnson	27	23	1511	17	4	3	53	2.10	708	0.925	2
Niklas Svedberg	1	1	61	1	0	0	2	1.97	35	0.943	0

Playoffs
Player	GP	GS	TOI	W	L	GA	GAA	SA	SV%	SO
Tuukka Rask	12	12	753	7	5	25	1.99	348	.928	2

== Awards and records ==
=== Awards ===
Player	Award	Date
Patrice Bergeron	Frank J. Selke Trophy	June 24, 2014
Patrice Bergeron	2014 NHL Foundation Award	June 24, 2014
Tuukka Rask	Vezina Trophy	June 24, 2014
Torey Krug	2013–14 NHL All-Rookie Team	June 24, 2014

== Transactions ==
The Bruins have been involved in the following transactions during the 2013–14 season:

=== Trades ===
July 4, 2013	To Dallas Stars: Rich Peverley; Tyler Seguin; Ryan Button	To Boston: Loui Eriksson; Matt Fraser; Reilly Smith; Joe Morrow
February 7, 2014	To Columbus Blue Jackets: Carter Camper	To Boston: Blake Parlett
March 5, 2014	To Philadelphia Flyers: conditional 3rd-round pick in 2014	To Boston: Andrej Meszaros

=== Free agents acquired ===
Player	Former team	Contract terms
Jarome Iginla	Pittsburgh Penguins	1 year, $1.8 million
Chad Johnson	Phoenix Coyotes	1 year, $600,000
Bobby Robins	Providence Bruins	1 year, $600,000
Nick Johnson	Phoenix Coyotes	1 year, $600,000
Mike Moore	Milwaukee Admirals	1 year, $550,000

=== Free agents lost ===
Player	New team	Contract terms
Andrew Ference	Edmonton Oilers	4 years, $13 million
Nathan Horton	Columbus Blue Jackets	7 years, $37.1 million
Anton Khudobin	Carolina Hurricanes	1 year, $800,000
Aaron Johnson	New York Rangers	1 year, $600,000
Jaromir Jagr	New Jersey Devils	1 year, $4 million

=== Claimed via waivers ===
Player	Previous team	Date
Corey Potter	Edmonton Oilers	March 5, 2014

=== Lost via waivers ===
Player	New team	Date

=== Lost via retirement ===
Player
Wade Redden

=== Player signings ===
Player	Date	Contract terms
Carter Camper	July 8, 2013	1 year, $550,000
Tuukka Rask	July 10, 2013	8 years, $56 million
Patrice Bergeron	July 12, 2013	8 years, $52 million contract extension
Kevan Miller	January 21, 2014	2 years, $1.6 million contract extension
Ben Sexton	March 20, 2014	2 years, $1.38 million entry-level contract
Brian Ferlin	April 11, 2014	2 years, $1.85 million entry-level contract
Linus Arnesson	June 1, 2014	3 years, $2.775 million entry-level contract
Niklas Svedberg	June 23, 2014	1 year, $600,000

== Draft picks ==
The Bruins drafted the following players at the 2013 NHL entry draft, in Newark, New Jersey, on June 30, 2013.

Round	#	Player	Pos	Nationality	College/Junior/Club team (League)
2	60	Linus Arnesson	Defence	Sweden	Djurgardens IF (HockeyAllsvenskan)
3	90	Peter Cehlarik	Left wing	Slovakia	Lulea HF (SHL)
4	120	Ryan Fitzgerald	Center	United States	Valley Jr. Warriors (EJHL)
5	150	Wiley Sherman	Defence	United States	Hotchkiss School (USHS)
6	180	Anton Blidh	Left wing	Sweden	Frolunda J20 (J20 SuperElit)
7	210	Mitchell Dempsey	Left wing	Canada	Sault Ste. Marie Greyhounds (OHL)

Draft notes

- Boston's first-round pick went to the Dallas Stars, as the result of a trade on April 2, 2013 that sent Jaromir Jagr to Boston, in exchange for Lane MacDermid, Cody Payne, and this pick.
