= 2013–14 Montreal Canadiens season =

NHL hockey team season

2013–14 Montreal Canadiens
- Division: 3rd Atlantic
- Conference: 4th Eastern
- 2013–14 record: 46–28–8
- Home record: 23–13–5
- Road record: 23–15–3
- Goals for: 215
- Goals against: 204

Team information
- General manager: Marc Bergevin
- Coach: Michel Therrien
- Captain: Brian Gionta
- Alternate captains: Josh Gorges; Andrei Markov
- Arena: Bell Centre
- Average attendance: 21,273 (100.0%)
- Minor league affiliates: Hamilton Bulldogs (AHL); Wheeling Nailers (ECHL)

Team leaders
- Goals: Max Pacioretty (39)
- Assists: P. K. Subban (43)
- Points: Max Pacioretty (60)
- Penalty minutes: Brandon Prust (121)
- Plus/minus: Andrei Markov (+12)
- Wins: Carey Price (34)
- Goals against average: Dustin Tokarski (1.84)

The 2013–14 Montreal Canadiens season was the 105th season of play for the franchise that was founded on December 4, 1909, and was their 97th season in the National Hockey League (NHL). Qualifying for the 2014 Stanley Cup playoffs, the Canadiens defeated the Tampa Bay Lightning by sweeping them in the first round. They upset the top team in the NHL, the Boston Bruins, in a hard-fought seven-game series, before falling to the New York Rangers in the Eastern Conference Final in six games.

== Standings ==
Atlantic Division
Pos	Team	GP	W	L	OTL	ROW	GF	GA	GD	Pts
1	p – Boston Bruins	82	54	19	9	51	261	177	+84	117
2	x – Tampa Bay Lightning	82	46	27	9	38	240	215	+25	101
3	x – Montreal Canadiens	82	46	28	8	40	215	204	+11	100
4	x – Detroit Red Wings	82	39	28	15	34	222	230	−8	93
5	Ottawa Senators	82	37	31	14	30	236	265	−29	88
6	Toronto Maple Leafs	82	38	36	8	29	231	256	−25	84
7	Florida Panthers	82	29	45	8	21	196	268	−72	66
8	Buffalo Sabres	82	21	51	10	14	157	248	−91	52

Source: National Hockey League
p – Clinched Presidents' Trophy; x – Clinched playoff spot

== Schedule and results ==
=== Pre-season ===
2013 preseason game log: 3–3–1 (Home: 2–2–1; Road: 1–1–0)
#	Date	Visitor	Score	Home	OT	Decision	Attendance	Record	Recap
1	September 15	Buffalo	5–4	Montreal	SO	Fucale	21,273	0–0–1	Recap
2	September 16	Boston	6–3	Montreal		Mayer	21,273	0–1–1	Recap
3^{[a]}	September 20	Montreal	6–0	Carolina		Budaj	15,176	1–1–1	Recap
4	September 21	Carolina	3–1	Montreal		Price	21,273	1–2–1	Recap
5	September 23	New Jersey	2–3	Montreal		Price	21,273	2–2–1	Recap
6	September 25	Montreal	2–5	Ottawa		Budaj	16,194	2–3–1	Recap
7	September 26	Ottawa	1–3	Montreal		Price	21,273	3–3–1	Recap
Notes:^{a} Game was played at Pepsi Coliseum in Quebec City.

=== Regular season ===
2013–14 Game Log

October: 8–5–0 (Home: 4–4–0; Road: 4–1–0)
#	Date	Visitor	Score	Home	OT	Decision	Attendance	Record	Pts	Recap
1	October 1	Toronto	4–3	Montreal		Price	21,273	0–1–0	0	Recap
2	October 5	Philadelphia	1–4	Montreal		Price	21,273	1–1–0	2	Recap
3	October 9	Montreal	2–3	Calgary		Price	19,289	1–2–0	2	Recap
4	October 10	Montreal	4–1	Edmonton		Budaj	16,839	2–2–0	4	Recap
5	October 12	Montreal	4–1	Vancouver		Price	18,910	3–2–0	6	Recap
6	October 15	Montreal	3–0	Winnipeg		Price	15,004	4–2–0	8	Recap
7	October 17	Columbus	3–5	Montreal		Price	21,273	5–2–0	10	Recap
8	October 19	Nashville	2–1	Montreal		Price	21,273	5–3–0	10	Recap
9	October 22	Edmonton	4–3	Montreal		Price	21,273	5–4–0	10	Recap
10	October 24	Anaheim	1–4	Montreal		Price	21,273	6–4–0	12	Recap
11	October 26	San Jose	2–0	Montreal		Price	21,273	6–5–0	12	Recap
12	October 28	Montreal	2–0	NY Rangers		Budaj	18,006	7–5–0	14	Recap
13	October 29	Dallas	1–2	Montreal		Price	21,273	8–5–0	16	Recap

November: 7–4–3 (Home: 4–1–2; Road: 3–3–1)
#	Date	Visitor	Score	Home	OT	Decision	Attendance	Record	Pts	Recap
14	November 1	Montreal	3–4	Minnesota		Price	18,207	8–6–0	16	Recap
15	November 2	Montreal	1–4	Colorado		Budaj	18,152	8–7–0	16	Recap
16	November 5	St. Louis	3–2	Montreal	SO	Price	21,273	8–7–1	17	Recap
17	November 7	Montreal	1–4	Ottawa		Price	19,292	8–8–1	17	Recap
18	November 10	NY Islanders	2–4	Montreal		Price	21,273	9–8–1	19	Recap
19	November 12	Tampa Bay	2–1	Montreal	SO	Price	21,273	9–8–2	20	Recap
20	November 15	Montreal	3–2	Columbus	SO	Budaj	11,562	10–8–2	22	Recap
21	November 16	NY Rangers	1–0	Montreal		Price	21,273	10–9–2	22	Recap
22	November 19	Minnesota	2–6	Montreal		Price	21,273	11–9–2	24	Recap
23	November 22	Montreal	3–2	Washington		Budaj	18,506	12–9–2	26	Recap
24	November 23	Pittsburgh	2–3	Montreal		Price	21,273	13–9–2	28	Recap
25	November 27	Montreal	3–1	Buffalo		Price	18,497	14–9–2	30	Recap
26	November 29	Montreal	2–3	Washington	SO	Budaj	18,506	14–9–3	31	Recap
27	November 30	Toronto	2–4	Montreal		Price	21,273	15–9–3	33	Recap

December: 8–5–1 (Home: 4–2–0; Road: 4–3–1)
#	Date	Visitor	Score	Home	OT	Decision	Attendance	Record	Pts	Recap
28	December 2	New Jersey	2–3	Montreal		Price	21,273	16–9–3	35	Recap
29	December 4	Montreal	4–3	New Jersey	SO	Budaj	12,742	17–9–3	37	Recap
30	December 5	Boston	1–2	Montreal		Price	21,273	18–9–3	39	Recap
31	December 7	Buffalo	2–3	Montreal		Price	21,273	19–9–3	41	Recap
32	December 10	Los Angeles	6–0	Montreal		Price	21,273	19–10–3	41	Recap
33	December 12	Montreal	1–2	Philadelphia		Price	19,748	19–11–3	41	Recap
34	December 14	Montreal	1–0	NY Islanders	OT	Price	14,408	20–11–3	43	Recap
35	December 15	Florida	2–1	Montreal		Budaj	21,273	20–12–3	43	Recap
36	December 17	Phoenix	1–3	Montreal		Price	21,273	21–12–3	45	Recap
37	December 19	Montreal	1–5	St. Louis		Price	17,189	21–13–3	45	Recap
38	December 21	Montreal	4–3	Nashville	OT	Price	16,095	22–13–3	47	Recap
39	December 28	Montreal	2–1	Tampa Bay	SO	Price	19,204	23–13–3	49	Recap
40	December 29	Montreal	1–4	Florida		Budaj	19,891	23–14–3	49	Recap
41	December 31	Montreal	4–5	Carolina	OT	Price	16,807	23–14–4	50	Recap

January: 6–6–1 (Home: 3–2–1; Road: 3–4–0)
#	Date	Visitor	Score	Home	OT	Decision	Attendance	Record	Pts	Recap
42	January 2	Montreal	6–4	Dallas		Price	13,007	24–14–4	52	Recap
43	January 4	Ottawa	4–3	Montreal	OT	Price	21,273	24–14–5	53	Recap
44	January 6	Florida	1–2	Montreal		Price	21,273	25–14–5	55	Recap
45	January 8	Montreal	1–3	Philadelphia		Budaj	19,949	25–15–5	55	Recap
46	January 11	Chicago	1–2	Montreal	OT	Price	21,273	26–15–5	57	Recap
47	January 14	New Jersey	4–1	Montreal		Price	21,273	26–16–5	57	Recap
48	January 16	Montreal	5–4	Ottawa	OT	Price	19,217	27–16–5	59	Recap
49	January 18	Montreal	3–5	Toronto		Price	19,667	27–17–5	59	Recap
50	January 22	Montreal	1–5	Pittsburgh		Price	18,617	27–18–5	59	Recap
51	January 24	Montreal	1–4	Detroit		Price	20,066	27–19–5	59	Recap
52	January 25	Washington	5–0	Montreal		Price	21,273	27–20–5	59	Recap
53	January 28	Carolina	0–3	Montreal		Price	21,273	28–20–5	61	Recap
54	January 30	Montreal	4–1	Boston		Budaj	17,565	29–20–5	63	Recap

February: 4–1–2 (Home: 2–1–2; Road: 2–0–0)
#	Date	Visitor	Score	Home	OT	Decision	Attendance	Record	Pts	Recap
55	February 1	Tampa Bay	2–1	Montreal	OT	Price	21,273	29–20–6	64	Recap
56	February 2	Winnipeg	2–1	Montreal		Price	21,273	29–21–6	64	Recap
57	February 4	Calgary	0–2	Montreal		Price	21,273	30–21–6	66	Recap
58	February 6	Vancouver	2–5	Montreal		Price	21,273	31–21–6	68	Recap
59	February 8	Montreal	4–1	Carolina		Price	18,680	32–21–6	70	Recap
60	February 26	Detroit	2–1	Montreal	OT	Budaj	21,273	32–21–7	71	Recap
61	February 27	Montreal	6–5	Pittsburgh	SO	Budaj	18,636	33–21–7	73	Recap

March: 10–5–0 (Home: 4–2–0; Road: 6–3–0)
#	Date	Visitor	Score	Home	OT	Decision	Attendance	Record	Pts	Recap
62	March 1	Toronto	3–4	Montreal	OT	Budaj	21,273	34–21–7	75	Recap
63	March 3	Montreal	1–2	Los Angeles		Budaj	18,118	34–22–7	75	Recap
64	March 5	Montreal	4–3	Anaheim	SO	Tokarski	17,174	35–22–7	77	Recap
65	March 6	Montreal	2–5	Phoenix		Budaj	15,282	35–23–7	77	Recap
66	March 8	Montreal	0–4	San Jose		Budaj	17,562	35–24–7	77	Recap
67	March 12	Boston	4–1	Montreal		Budaj	21,273	35–25–7	77	Recap
68	March 15	Ottawa	4–5	Montreal	OT	Price	21,273	36–25–7	79	Recap
69	March 16	Montreal	2–0	Buffalo		Tokarski	19,070	37–25–7	81	Recap
70	March 18	Colorado	3–6	Montreal		Price	21,273	38–25–7	83	Recap
71	March 20	Columbus	3–2	Montreal		Price	21,273	38–26–7	83	Recap
72	March 22	Montreal	4–3	Toronto		Price	19,789	39–26–7	85	Recap
73	March 24	Montreal	2–1	Boston	SO	Budaj	17,565	40–26–7	87	Recap
74	March 25	Buffalo	0–2	Montreal		Price	21,273	41–26–7	89	Recap
75	March 27	Montreal	5–4	Detroit		Price	20,066	42–26–7	91	Recap
76	March 29	Montreal	4–1	Florida		Price	17,119	43–26–7	93	Recap

April: 3–2–1 (Home: 2–1–0; Road: 1–1–1)
#	Date	Visitor	Score	Home	OT	Decision	Attendance	Record	Pts	Recap
77	April 1	Montreal	1–3	Tampa Bay		Price	18,808	43–27–7	93	Recap
78	April 4	Montreal	7–4	Ottawa		Budaj	19,241	44–27–7	95	Recap
79	April 5	Detroit	3–5	Montreal		Price	21,273	45–27–7	97	Recap
80	April 9	Montreal	2–3	Chicago	OT	Budaj	21,571	45–27–8	98	Recap
81	April 10	NY Islanders	2–0	Montreal		Price	21,273	45–28–8	98	Recap
82	April 12	NY Rangers	0–1	Montreal	OT	Price	21,273	46–28–8	100	Recap

Legend: Win (2 points) Loss (0 points) Overtime/shootout loss (1 point)

== Playoffs ==
The Montreal Canadiens entered the playoffs as the Atlantic Division's third seed. They swept the Tampa Bay Lightning in the first round, and faced the Presidents' Trophy-winning Boston Bruins in the second round. They defeated the Bruins in a deciding Game 7 and advanced to the Eastern Conference Final where they were eliminated by the New York Rangers in six games with their star goaltender Carey Price injured.

2014 Stanley Cup playoffs

Eastern Conference First Round vs. (A2) Tampa Bay Lightning: Montreal won series, 4–0
No.	Date	Visitor	Score	Home	OT	Decision	Attendance	Series	Recap
1	April 16	Montreal	5–4	Tampa Bay	OT	Price	19,204	1–0	Recap
2	April 18	Montreal	4–1	Tampa Bay		Price	19,204	2–0	Recap
3	April 20	Tampa Bay	2–3	Montreal		Price	21,273	3–0	Recap
4	April 22	Tampa Bay	3–4	Montreal		Price	21,273	4–0	Recap

Eastern Conference Second Round vs. (A1) Boston Bruins: Montreal won series, 4–3
No.	Date	Visitor	Score	Home	OT	Decision	Attendance	Series	Recap
1	May 1	Montreal	4–3	Boston	2OT	Price	17,565	1–0	Recap
2	May 3	Montreal	3–5	Boston		Price	17,565	1–1	Recap
3	May 6	Boston	2–4	Montreal		Price	21,273	2–1	Recap
4	May 8	Boston	1–0	Montreal	OT	Price	21,273	2–2	Recap
5	May 10	Montreal	2–4	Boston		Price	17,565	2–3	Recap
6	May 12	Boston	0–4	Montreal		Price	21,273	3–3	Recap
7	May 14	Montreal	3–1	Boston		Price	17,565	4–3	Recap

Eastern Conference Final vs. (M2) New York Rangers: New York won series, 4–2
No.	Date	Visitor	Score	Home	OT	Decision	Attendance	Series	Recap
1	May 17	NY Rangers	7–2	Montreal		Price	21,273	0–1	Recap
2	May 19	NY Rangers	3–1	Montreal		Tokarski	21,273	0–2	Recap
3	May 22	Montreal	3–2	NY Rangers	OT	Tokarski	18,006	1–2	Recap
4	May 25	Montreal	2–3	NY Rangers	OT	Tokarski	18,006	1–3	Recap
5	May 27	NY Rangers	4–7	Montreal		Tokarski	21,273	2–3	Recap
6	May 29	Montreal	0–1	NY Rangers		Tokarski	18,006	2–4	Recap

Legend: Win Loss

== Player statistics ==
Final stats

=== Skaters ===
Regular season
Player	GP	G	A	Pts	+/–	PIM
Max Pacioretty	73	39	21	60	8	35
P. K. Subban	82	10	43	53	−4	81
David Desharnais	79	16	36	52	11	24
Tomas Plekanec	81	20	23	43	11	38
Andrei Markov	81	7	36	43	12	34
Brendan Gallagher	81	19	22	41	4	73
Brian Gionta	81	18	22	40	1	22
Alex Galchenyuk	65	13	18	31	−12	26
Lars Eller	77	12	14	26	−15	68
Daniel Briere	69	13	12	25	1	30
Alexei Emelin	59	3	14	17	−1	59
Rene Bourque	63	9	7	16	−1	32
Thomas Vanek^{†}	18	6	9	15	8	8
Michael Bournival	60	7	7	14	−6	18
Josh Gorges	66	1	13	14	6	12
Brandon Prust	52	6	7	13	−1	121
Travis Moen	65	2	10	12	2	49
Raphael Diaz^{‡}	46	0	11	11	−4	12
Mike Weaver^{†}	17	1	6	7	9	8
Francis Bouillon	52	2	4	6	−5	34
Ryan White	52	2	4	6	−8	50
Dale Weise^{†}	17	3	1	4	4	17
Douglas Murray	53	0	2	2	−12	42
Jarred Tinordi	22	0	2	2	−2	40
Nathan Beaulieu	17	0	2	2	6	8
George Parros	22	0	1	1	−6	85
Martin St. Pierre	1	0	0	0	0	0
Mike Blunden	7	0	0	0	−2	5
Louis Leblanc	8	0	0	0	1	4
Joonas Nattinen	1	0	0	0	0	0
Gabriel Dumont	2	0	0	0	0	0
Christian Thomas	2	0	0	0	−1	0
Patrick Holland	5	0	0	0	0	0

Playoffs
Player	GP	G	A	Pts	+/–	PIM
P. K. Subban	17	5	9	14	1	24
Lars Eller	17	5	8	13	6	18
Rene Bourque	17	8	3	11	4	27
Max Pacioretty	17	5	6	11	−1	8
Brendan Gallagher	17	4	7	11	0	6
Thomas Vanek	17	5	5	10	−4	4
Andrei Markov	17	1	9	10	−4	10
Tomas Plekanec	17	4	5	9	−7	8
David Desharnais	17	2	6	8	4	6
Dale Weise	16	3	4	7	5	4
Daniel Briere	16	3	4	7	−1	4
Brian Gionta	17	1	6	7	0	2
Mike Weaver	17	1	3	4	8	14
Alex Galchenyuk	5	2	1	3	0	2
Francis Bouillon	9	2	0	2	4	4
Josh Gorges	17	0	2	2	0	6
Brandon Prust	13	0	2	2	1	32
Alexei Emelin	15	0	2	2	−4	4
Nathan Beaulieu	7	0	2	2	3	2
Michael Bournival	14	0	1	1	−3	0
Douglas Murray	3	0	0	0	−1	0
Travis Moen	4	0	0	0	0	0

=== Goaltenders ===
Regular season
Player	GP	GS	TOI	W	L	OT	GA	GAA	SA	SV%	SO	G	A	PIM
Carey Price	59	59	3464	34	20	5	134	2.32	1828	.927	6	0	2	4
Peter Budaj	24	21	1338	10	8	3	56	2.51	615	.909	1	0	0	6
Dustin Tokarski	3	2	163	2	0	0	5	1.84	93	.946	1	0	0	0

Playoffs
Player	GP	GS	TOI	W	L	GA	GAA	SA	SV%	SO	G	A	PIM
Carey Price	12	12	739	8	4	29	2.35	358	.919	1	0	0	0
Dustin Tokarski	5	5	300	2	3	13	2.60	155	.916	0	0	0	0
Peter Budaj	1	0	20	0	0	3	3.00	8	.625	0	0	0	0

^{†}Denotes player spent time with another team before joining the Canadiens. Stats reflect time with the Candadiens only.
^{‡}Denotes player was traded mid-season. Stats reflect time with the Canadiens only.
Bold/italics denotes franchise record

== Suspensions/fines ==
Player	Explanation	Length	Salary	Date issued	Ref
Alexei Emelin	Butt-ending Canucks forward Pascal Pelletier	N/A	$5,000.00	February 7, 2014	
Douglas Murray	Illegal check to the head of Lightning defenceman Michael Kostka	3 games	$23,076.93	April 3, 2014	
Brandon Prust	Interfering with Rangers forward Derek Stepan	2 games	N/A	May 23, 2014	

== Awards and honours ==
=== Milestones ===
Regular season
Player	Milestone	Reached
Michael Bournvial	1st Career NHL Game	October 5, 2013
Tomas Plekanec	600th Career NHL Game	October 5, 2013
Michael Bournival	1st Career NHL Goal; 1st Career NHL Point	October 17, 2013
Michael Bournival	1st Career NHL Assist	October 19, 2013
Patrick Holland	1st Career NHL Game	October 22, 2013
P. K. Subban	100th Career NHL Assist	November 27, 2013
Joonas Nattinen	1st Career NHL Game	January 18, 2014
Daniel Briere	900th Career NHL Game	March 8, 2014
Max Pacioretty	100th Career NHL Assist	March 15, 2014
Max Pacioretty	200th Career NHL Point	March 18, 2014
Max Pacioretty	100th Career NHL Goal	March 25, 2014
Douglas Murray	500th Career NHL Game	February 2, 2014
Mike Weaver	600th Career NHL Game	April 9, 2014

Playoffs
Player	Milestone	Reached
Michael Bournvial	1st Career Playoff Game	April 16, 2014
Alexei Emelin	1st Career Playoff Game; 1st Career Playoff Assist; 1st Career Playoff Point	April 16, 2014
Brendan Gallagher	1st Career Playoff Assist	April 16, 2014
Michael Bournival	1st Career Playoff Assist; 1st Career Playoff Point	April 22, 2014
Brian Gionta	100th Career Playoff Game	May 1, 2014
Nathan Beaulieu	1st Career Playoff Game; 1st Career Playoff Assist; 1st Career Playoff Point	May 12, 2014
Rene Bourque	1st Career Playoff Hat-trick	May 27, 2014

== Transactions ==
The Canadiens have been involved in the following transactions during the 2013–14 season:

=== Trades ===
Date	Details	
June 30, 2013	To Florida Panthers 7th round-pick in 2013 – MacKenzie Weegar	To Montreal Canadiens 7th round-pick in 2014 (Note: Pick subsequently traded back to Florida Panthers.) – Hugo Fagerblom
July 2, 2013	To New York Rangers Danny Kristo	To Montreal Canadiens Christian Thomas
July 5, 2013	To Florida Panthers Philippe Lefebvre; 7th-round pick in 2014 – Hugo Fagerblom	To Montreal Canadiens George Parros
February 3, 2014	To Vancouver Canucks Raphael Diaz	To Montreal Canadiens Dale Weise
February 6, 2014	To Los Angeles Kings Steve Quailer	To Montreal Canadiens Robert Czarnik
March 4, 2014	To Florida Panthers 5th-round pick in 2015 (Note: Pick subsequently traded to New York Islanders.) – Ryan Pilon	To Montreal Canadiens Mike Weaver
March 5, 2014	To Nashville Predators Future considerations	To Montreal Canadiens Devan Dubnyk
March 5, 2014	To New York Islanders Sebastian Collberg; Conditional 2nd-round pick in 2014 (Note: Condition satisfied; pick subsequently traded to Tampa Bay Lightning.) – Johnathan MacLeod	To Montreal Canadiens Thomas Vanek; Conditional 5th-round pick in 2014 – Nikolas Koberstein
June 14, 2014	To Anaheim Ducks Louis Leblanc	To Montreal Canadiens Conditional 5th-round pick in 2015 (Note: Condition not satisfied.)

=== Free agents acquired ===
Player	Former team	Contract terms
Daniel Briere	Philadelphia Flyers	2 years, $8 million
Stefan Fournier	Halifax Mooseheads	3 years, $1.75 million entry-level contract
Martin St. Pierre	Rockford IceHogs	1 year, $550,000
Nick Tarnasky	Rochester Americans	1 year, $550,000
Robert Mayer	Hamilton Bulldogs	2 years, $1.24 million
Douglas Murray	Pittsburgh Penguins	1 year, $1.5 million
Daniel Carr	Union College	2 years, $1.85 million entry-level contract

=== Free agents lost ===
Player	New team	Contract terms
Yannick Weber	Vancouver Canucks	1 year, $650,000
Michael Ryder	New Jersey Devils	2 years, $7 million
Frederic St. Denis	Columbus Blue Jackets	1 year, $575,000 (two-way)
Jeff Halpern	Phoenix Coyotes	1 year, $600,000 (two-way)
Jason DeSantis	HIFK	1 year
Petteri Nokelainen	Brynäs IF	1 year

=== Lost via retirement ===
Player
Blake Geoffrion

=== Player signings ===
Player	Date	Contract terms
Gabriel Dumont	July 10, 2013	2 years, $1.125 million
Michael McCarron	July 11, 2013	3 years, $2.775 million entry-level contract
Ryan White	July 12, 2013	1 year, $700,000
Sven Andrighetto	July 15, 2013	3 years, $1.9 million entry-level contract
Dustin Tokarski	August 19, 2013	1 year, $575,000
Zach Fucale	September 13, 2013	3 years, $2.775 million entry-level contract
Alexei Emelin	October 31, 2013	4 years, $16.4 million contract extension
Mac Bennett	March 26, 2014	2 years, $1.38 million entry-level contract
Dustin Tokarski	April 12, 2014	2 years, $1.125 million contract extension
Jacob de la Rose	April 14, 2014	3 years, $2.775 million entry-level contract
Connor Crisp	April 24, 2014	3 years, $2.4 million entry-level contract
Greg Pateryn	May 8, 2014	2 years, $1.125 million contract extension
Dalton Thrower	May 30, 2014	3 years, $2.18 million entry-level contract
Dale Weise	June 17, 2014	2 years, $2.05 million contract extension
Andrei Markov	June 23, 2014	3 years, $17.25 million contract extension

== Draft picks ==
Montreal Canadiens' picks at the 2013 NHL entry draft, which was held in Newark, New Jersey on June 30, 2013.

Round	#	Player	Pos	Nationality	College/Junior/Club team (League)
1	25	Michael McCarron	RW	United States	Western Michigan University (CCHA)
2	34^{[a]}	Jacob de la Rose	LW	Sweden	Leksands IF (SHL)
2	36^{[b]}	Zach Fucale	G	Canada	Halifax Mooseheads (QMJHL)
2	55	Artturi Lehkonen	LW	Finland	KalPa (SM-liiga)
3	71^{[c]}	Connor Crisp	LW	Canada	Erie Otters (OHL)
3	86	Sven Andrighetto	RW	Switzerland	Rouyn-Noranda Huskies (QMJHL)
4	116	Martin Reway	LW	Slovakia	Gatineau Olympiques (QMJHL)
6	176	Jeremy Gregoire	C	Canada	Baie-Comeau Drakkar (QMJHL)

=== Notes ===
- ^{a} The Nashville Predators' second-round pick went to the Montreal Canadiens as a result of a February 27, 2012, trade that sent Andrei Kostitsyn to the Predators in exchange for a 2013 conditional fifth-round pick and this pick.
- ^{b} The Calgary Flames' second-round pick went to the Montreal Canadiens as a result of a January 12, 2012, trade that sent Michael Cammalleri, Karri Ramo and a 2012 fifth-round pick (#124–Ryan Culkin) to the Flames in exchange for Rene Bourque, Patrick Holland and this pick.
- ^{c} The Dallas Stars' third-round pick went to the Montreal Canadiens as a result of a February 26, 2013, trade that sent Erik Cole to the Stars in exchange for Michael Ryder and this pick.
