= 2013–14 Florida Panthers season =

National Hockey League team season

2013–14 Florida Panthers
- Division: 7th Atlantic
- Conference: 15th Eastern
- 2013–14 record: 29–45–8
- Home record: 16–20–5
- Road record: 13–25–3
- Goals for: 196
- Goals against: 268

Team information
- General manager: Dale Tallon
- Coach: Kevin Dineen (Oct.–Nov.); Peter Horachek (Nov.–Apr.)
- Captain: Ed Jovanovski
- Alternate captains: Brian Campbell; Marcel Goc (Oct.–Mar.); Scottie Upshall (Mar.–Apr.)
- Arena: BB&T Center
- Average attendance: 14,177 (83.2%) (41 games)
- Minor league affiliates: San Antonio Rampage (AHL); Cincinnati Cyclones (ECHL)

Team leaders
- Goals: Brad Boyes (21)
- Assists: Brian Campbell (30)
- Points: Nick Bjugstad (38)
- Penalty minutes: Erik Gudbranson (114)
- Plus/minus: Alex Petrovic (3)
- Wins: Tim Thomas (16)
- Goals against average: Roberto Luongo (2.46)

The 2013–14 Florida Panthers season was the 20th season for the National Hockey League (NHL) franchise that was established on June 14, 1993. The Panthers missed the playoffs for the second consecutive year for the first time since the 2009–10 season and the 2010–11 season.

== Pre-season ==
The Panthers were sold on September 27, 2013, to the chairman and CEO of Virtu Financial, Vincent Viola.

== Standings ==
Atlantic Division
Pos	Team	GP	W	L	OTL	ROW	GF	GA	GD	Pts
1	p – Boston Bruins	82	54	19	9	51	261	177	+84	117
2	x – Tampa Bay Lightning	82	46	27	9	38	240	215	+25	101
3	x – Montreal Canadiens	82	46	28	8	40	215	204	+11	100
4	x – Detroit Red Wings	82	39	28	15	34	222	230	−8	93
5	Ottawa Senators	82	37	31	14	30	236	265	−29	88
6	Toronto Maple Leafs	82	38	36	8	29	231	256	−25	84
7	Florida Panthers	82	29	45	8	21	196	268	−72	66
8	Buffalo Sabres	82	21	51	10	14	157	248	−91	52

Source: National Hockey League
p – Clinched Presidents' Trophy; x – Clinched playoff spot

Eastern Conference Wild Card
Pos	Div	Team	GP	W	L	OTL	ROW	GF	GA	GD	Pts
1	ME	x – Columbus Blue Jackets	82	43	32	7	38	231	216	+15	93
2	AT	x – Detroit Red Wings	82	39	28	15	34	222	230	−8	93
3	ME	Washington Capitals	82	38	30	14	28	235	240	−5	90
4	ME	New Jersey Devils	82	35	29	18	35	197	208	−11	88
5	AT	Ottawa Senators	82	37	31	14	30	236	265	−29	88
6	AT	Toronto Maple Leafs	82	38	36	8	29	231	256	−25	84
7	ME	Carolina Hurricanes	82	36	35	11	34	207	230	−23	83
8	ME	New York Islanders	82	34	37	11	25	225	267	−42	79
9	AT	Florida Panthers	82	29	45	8	21	196	268	−72	66
10	AT	Buffalo Sabres	82	21	51	10	14	157	248	−91	52

Source: National Hockey League
x – Clinched playoff spot

== Schedule and results ==
=== Pre-season ===
2013 preseason game log: 3–1–3 (Home: 3–1–0; Road: 0–0–3)
#	Date	Visitor	Score	Home	OT	Decision	Attendance	Record	Recap
1	September 16	Nashville	3–6	Florida		Madore	0	1–0–0	Recap
2	September 16	Nashville	2–3	Florida	OT	Houser	6,541	2–0–0	Recap
3	September 18	Florida	2–3	Dallas	SO	Markstrom	6,532	2–0–1	Recap
4^{[a]}	September 20	Dallas	4–1	Florida		Houser		2–1–1	Recap
5	September 21	Florida	4–5	Tampa Bay	SO	Markstrom	13,135	2–1–2	Recap
6^{[b]}	September 26	Florida	2–3	Tampa Bay	OT	Markstrom	3,451	2–1–3	Recap
7	September 28	Tampa Bay	3–5	Florida		Thomas	12,547	3–1–3	Recap
Notes:^{a} Game was played at AT&T Center in San Antonio, Texas.^{b} Game was played at Germain Arena in Estero, Florida.

=== Regular season ===
2013–14 Game Log

October: 3–7–2 (Home: 2–3–2; Road: 1–4–0)
#	Date	Visitor	Score	Home	OT	Decision	Attendance	Record	Pts	Recap
1	October 3	Florida	4–2	Dallas		Thomas	16,100	1–0–0	2	Recap
2	October 5	Florida	0–7	St. Louis		Thomas	16,264	1–1–0	2	Recap
3	October 8	Florida	1–2	Philadelphia		Thomas	19,589	1–2–0	2	Recap
4	October 10	Florida	2–7	Tampa Bay		Markstrom	19,204	1–3–0	2	Recap
5	October 11	Pittsburgh	3–6	Florida		Markstrom	18,584	2–3–0	4	Recap
6	October 13	Los Angeles	3–0	Florida		Markstrom	12,810	2–4–0	4	Recap
7	October 15	Florida	3–4	Nashville		Markstrom	15,935	2–5–0	4	Recap
8	October 17	Boston	3–2	Florida		Thomas	14,440	2–6–0	4	Recap
9	October 19	Minnesota	1–2	Florida	OT	Thomas	13,081	3–6–0	6	Recap
10	October 22	Chicago	3–2	Florida	OT	Markstrom	15,779	3–6–1	7	Recap
11	October 25	Buffalo	3–1	Florida		Markstrom	12,984	3–7–1	7	Recap
12	October 27	Tampa Bay	4–3	Florida	OT	Markstrom	12,336	3–7–2	8	Recap

November: 4–8–3 (Home: 2–3–1; Road: 2–5–2)
#	Date	Visitor	Score	Home	OT	Decision	Attendance	Record	Pts	Recap
13	November 1	St. Louis	4–0	Florida		Markstrom	12,922	3–8–2	8	Recap
14	November 2	Florida	2–3	Washington	SO	Clemmensen	18,506	3–8–3	9	Recap
15	November 5	Edmonton	4–3	Florida	OT	Markstrom	12,035	3–8–4	10	Recap
16	November 7	Florida	1–4	Boston		Clemmensen	17,565	3–9–4	10	Recap
17	November 9	Florida	2–3	Ottawa		Thomas	16,244	3–10–4	10	Recap
18	November 10	Florida	3–4	NY Rangers		Thomas	18,006	3–11–4	10	Recap
19	November 12	Anaheim	2–3	Florida		Thomas	13,354	4–11–4	12	Recap
20	November 15	Florida	2–3	Minnesota		Thomas	18,102	4–12–4	12	Recap
21	November 16	Florida	4–1	Colorado		Thomas	17,321	5–12–4	14	Recap
22	November 19	Florida	3–2	Vancouver	SO	Thomas	18,910	6–12–4	16	Recap
23	November 21	Florida	1–4	Edmonton		Thomas	16,839	6–13–4	16	Recap
24	November 22	Florida	3–4	Calgary	SO	Thomas	19,289	6–13–5	17	Recap
25	November 25	Philadelphia	1–3	Florida		Thomas	14,299	7–13–5	19	Recap
26	November 27	NY Rangers	5–2	Florida		Thomas	17,268	7–14–5	19	Recap
27	November 30	Pittsburgh	5–1	Florida		Thomas	17,583	7–15–5	19	Recap

December: 8–5–1 (Home: 4–3–1; Road: 4–2–0)
#	Date	Visitor	Score	Home	OT	Decision	Attendance	Record	Pts	Recap
28	December 3	Ottawa	4–2	Florida		Thomas	10,074	7–16–5	19	Recap
29	December 5	Winnipeg	2–5	Florida		Thomas	10,966	8–16–5	21	Recap
30	December 7	Florida	2–1	Detroit		Thomas	20,066	9–16–5	23	Recap
31	December 8	Florida	2–6	Chicago		Clemmensen	21,119	9–17–5	23	Recap
32	December 10	Detroit	2–3	Florida	SO	Thomas	13,358	10–17–5	25	Recap
33	December 13	Washington	2–3	Florida	SO	Clemmensen	15,097	11–17–5	27	Recap
34	December 15	Florida	2–1	Montreal		Clemmensen	21,273	12–17–5	29	Recap
35	December 17	Florida	3–1	Toronto		Clemmensen	19,076	13–17–5	31	Recap
36	December 19	Florida	4–2	Ottawa		Clemmensen	15,927	14–17–5	33	Recap
37	December 20	Florida	2–5	Winnipeg		Markstrom	15,004	14–18–5	33	Recap
38	December 23	Tampa Bay	6–1	Florida		Clemmensen	15,942	14–19–5	33	Recap
39	December 28	Detroit	3–2	Florida		Clemmensen	18,932	14–20–5	33	Recap
40	December 29	Montreal	1–4	Florida		Clemmensen	19,891	15–20–5	35	Recap
41	December 31	NY Rangers	2–1	Florida	SO	Thomas	16,083	15–20–6	36	Recap

January: 6–6–1 (Home: 2–2–0; Road: 4–4–1)
#	Date	Visitor	Score	Home	OT	Decision	Attendance	Record	Pts	Recap
42	January 4	Nashville	4–5	Florida	SO	Thomas	15,796	16–20–6	38	Recap
43	January 6	Florida	1–2	Montreal		Thomas	21,273	16–21–6	38	Recap
44	January 9	Florida	2–1	Buffalo	SO	Thomas	17,872	17–21–6	40	Recap
45	January 11	Florida	1–2	New Jersey	OT	Thomas	16,592	17–21–7	41	Recap
46	January 14	NY Islanders	2–4	Florida		Thomas	13,730	18–21–7	43	Recap
47	January 16	San Jose	3–0	Florida		Thomas	13,149	18–22–7	43	Recap
48	January 18	Florida	2–3	Carolina		Thomas	15,476	18–23–7	43	Recap
49	January 20	Florida	5–1	Pittsburgh		Clemmensen	18,660	19–23–7	45	Recap
50	January 21	Florida	4–3	Buffalo		Thomas	17,583	20–23–7	47	Recap
51	January 24	Colorado	3–2	Florida		Thomas	17,274	20–24–7	47	Recap
52	January 26	Florida	5–4	Detroit	SO	Thomas	20,066	21–24–7	49	Recap
53	January 28	Florida	2–6	Boston		Thomas	17,565	21–25–7	49	Recap
54	January 30	Florida	3–6	Toronto		Clemmensen	19,448	21–26–7	49	Recap

February: 1–4–0 (Home: 1–2–0; Road: 0–2–0)
#	Date	Visitor	Score	Home	OT	Decision	Attendance	Record	Pts	Recap
55	February 1	Florida	1–4	Columbus		Thomas	16,762	21–27–7	49	Recap
56	February 4	Toronto	1–4	Florida		Thomas	15,583	22–27–7	51	Recap
57	February 6	Detroit	3–1	Florida		Thomas	15,623	22–28–7	51	Recap
58	February 7	Florida	1–5	Carolina		Thomas	16,132	22–29–7	51	Recap
59	February 27	Washington	5–4	Florida		Thomas	14,180	22–30–7	51	Recap

March: 5–11–1 (Home: 3–4–1; Road: 2–7–0)
#	Date	Visitor	Score	Home	OT	Decision	Attendance	Record	Pts	Recap
60	March 1	Florida	3–6	Columbus		Clemmensen	15,441	22–31–7	51	Recap
61	March 2	Florida	5–3	NY Islanders		Thomas	13,008	23–31–7	53	Recap
62	March 4	Florida	1–4	Boston		Thomas	17,565	23–32–7	53	Recap
63	March 7	Buffalo	0–2	Florida		Luongo	14,402	24–32–7	55	Recap
64	March 9	Boston	5–2	Florida		Luongo	18,858	24–33–7	55	Recap
65	March 11	Phoenix	3–1	Florida		Luongo	12,211	24–34–7	55	Recap
66	March 13	Florida	4–5	Tampa Bay		Ellis	18,324	24–35–7	55	Recap
67	March 14	New Jersey	3–5	Florida		Luongo	14,496	25–35–7	57	Recap
68	March 16	Vancouver	4–3	Florida	SO	Luongo	14,215	25–35–8	58	Recap
69	March 18	Florida	3–2	San Jose		Luongo	17,562	26–35–8	60	Recap
70	March 20	Florida	1–2	Phoenix		Luongo	14,442	26–36–8	60	Recap
71	March 22	Florida	0–4	Los Angeles		Luongo	18,118	26–37–8	60	Recap
72	March 23	Florida	2–6	Anaheim		Ellis	17,281	26–38–8	60	Recap
73	March 25	Ottawa	2–3	Florida		Luongo	13,435	27–38–8	62	Recap
74	March 27	Carolina	3–0	Florida		Luongo	12,379	27–39–8	62	Recap
75	March 29	Montreal	4–1	Florida		Ellis	17,119	27–40–8	62	Recap
76	March 31	Florida	3–6	New Jersey		Ellis	15,209	27–41–8	62	Recap

April: 2–4–0 (Home: 2–3–0; Road: 0–1–0)
#	Date	Visitor	Score	Home	OT	Decision	Attendance	Record	Pts	Recap
77	April 1	Florida	2–4	NY Islanders		Clemmensen	11,812	27–42–8	62	Recap
78	April 4	Calgary	2–1	Florida		Luongo	12,055	27–43–8	62	Recap
79	April 6	Dallas	2–3	Florida		Luongo	13,366	28–43–8	64	Recap
80	April 8	Philadelphia	5–2	Florida		Ellis	12,487	28–44–8	64	Recap
81	April 10	Toronto	2–4	Florida		Luongo	13,110	29–44–8	66	Recap
82	April 12	Columbus	3–2	Florida		Luongo	14,241	29–45–8	66	Recap

Legend: Win (2 points) Loss (0 points) Overtime/shootout loss (1 point)

== Player stats ==
Final stats

Skaters

Regular season
Player	GP	G	A	Pts	+/−	PIM
Nick Bjugstad	76	16	22	38	−14	16
Scottie Upshall	76	15	22	37	1	73
Brian Campbell	82	7	30	37	−6	20
Brad Boyes	78	21	15	36	−6	28
Sean Bergenheim	62	16	13	29	−16	40
Jonathan Huberdeau	69	9	19	28	−5	37
Tomas Fleischmann	80	8	20	28	−18	22
Tom Gilbert	73	3	25	28	−5	18
Aleksander Barkov	54	8	16	24	−3	10
Marcel Goc^{‡}	62	11	12	23	−7	31
Dmitri Kulikov	81	8	11	19	−26	66
Jimmy Hayes^{†}	53	11	7	18	−6	18
Jesse Winchester	52	9	9	18	−2	38
Shawn Matthias^{‡}	59	9	7	16	0	14
Brandon Pirri^{†}	21	7	7	14	0	2
Tomas Kopecky	49	4	8	12	0	18
Dylan Olsen	44	3	9	12	−3	8
Scott Gomez	46	2	10	12	−11	24
Erik Gudbranson	65	3	6	9	−7	114
Vincent Trocheck	20	5	3	8	−11	6
Drew Shore	24	5	2	7	−1	8
Kris Versteeg^{‡}	18	2	5	7	−9	9
Quinton Howden	16	4	2	6	0	10
Mike Weaver^{‡}	55	0	6	6	−9	23
Ed Jovanovski	37	1	4	5	−6	39
Krys Barch	55	0	4	4	−10	99
Matt Gilroy	16	1	1	2	−2	6
Colby Robak	16	0	2	2	−4	6
Joey Crabb	9	0	1	1	−2	7
Bobby Butler	2	0	1	1	1	2
Alex Petrovic	7	0	1	1	3	8
Mike Mottau	8	0	0	0	−3	4
Ryan Whitney	7	0	0	0	−7	6
Garrett Wilson	3	0	0	0	−1	0
Jonathan Racine	1	0	0	0	−1	2

Goaltenders

Regular season
Player	GP	GS	TOI	W	L	OT	GA	GAA	SA	SV%	SO	G	A	PIM
Tim Thomas^{‡}	40	40	2,298:50	16	20	3	110	2.87	1206	0.909	0	0	1	4
Scott Clemmensen	17	14	914:11	6	7	1	47	3.09	454	0.896	0	0	1	0
Roberto Luongo^{†}	14	14	804:18	6	7	1	33	2.46	432	0.924	1	0	0	2
Dan Ellis^{†}	6	5	337:16	0	5	0	27	4.81	165	0.836	0	0	0	0
Jacob Markstrom^{‡}	12	9	613:47	1	6	3	36	3.52	285	0.874	0	0	0	0

^{†}Denotes player spent time with another team before joining the Panthers. Stats reflect time with the Panthers only.
^{‡}Denotes player was traded mid-season. Stats reflect time with the Panthers only.
Bold/italics denotes franchise record.

== Transactions ==
The Panthers have been involved in the following transactions during the 2013–14 season.

=== Trades ===
Date	Details
June 30, 2013	To Montreal Canadiens 7th-round pick in 2014 (Note: Pick subsequently traded back to Florida.) – Hugo Fagerblom	To Florida Panthers 7th-round pick in 2013 – MacKenzie Weegar
July 5, 2013	To Montreal Canadiens George Parros	To Florida Panthers Philippe Lefebvre; 7th-round pick in 2014 – Hugo Fagerblom
September 28, 2013	To New Jersey Devils Scott Timmins; 6th-round pick in 2014 – Joey Dudek	To Florida Panthers Krys Barch; 7th-round pick in 2015 – Ryan Bednard
November 14, 2013	To Chicago Blackhawks Kris Versteeg; Philippe Lefebvre	To Florida Panthers Jimmy Hayes; Dylan Olsen
January 17, 2014	To Edmonton Oilers Steve Pinizzotto; Jack Combs	To Florida Panthers Ryan Martindale; Derek Nesbitt
March 2, 2014	To St. Louis Blues Eric Selleck	To Florida Panthers Mark Mancari
March 2, 2014	To Chicago Blackhawks 3rd-round pick in 2014 (Note: Pick subsequently traded to San Jose Sharks, then to Nashville Predators.) – Justin Kirkland; 5th-round pick in 2016 (Note: Pick subsequently traded to St. Louis Blues.) – Connor Bleackley	To Florida Panthers Brandon Pirri
March 4, 2014	To Montreal Canadiens Mike Weaver	To Florida Panthers 5th-round pick in 2015 (Note: Pick subsequently traded to New York Islanders.) – Ryan Pilon
March 4, 2014	To Vancouver Canucks Jacob Markstrom; Shawn Matthias	To Florida Panthers Roberto Luongo; Steven Anthony
March 5, 2014	To Pittsburgh Penguins Marcel Goc	To Florida Panthers 5th-round pick in 2014 – Miguel Fidler; 3rd-round pick in 2015 – Sam Montembeault
March 5, 2014	To Dallas Stars Tim Thomas	To Florida Panthers Dan Ellis

=== Free agents acquired ===
Player	Former team	Contract terms
Joey Crabb	Washington Capitals	2 years, $1.2 million
Mike Mottau	Toronto Marlies	1 year, $700,000
Jesse Winchester	Jokerit	1 year, $600,000
Jon Matsumoto	Chicago Wolves	1 year, $700,000
Matt Gilroy	New York Rangers	1 year, $700,000
Scott Gomez	San Jose Sharks	1 year, $900,000
Steve Pinizzotto	Vancouver Canucks	1 year, $650,000
Tim Thomas	New York Islanders	1 year, $2.5 million
Brad Boyes	New York Islanders	1 year, $1 million
Tom Gilbert	Minnesota Wild	1 year, $900,000
Ryan Whitney	Edmonton Oilers	1 year, $900,000

=== Free agents lost ===
Player	New team	Contract terms
Stephen Weiss	Detroit Red Wings	5 years, $24.5 million
Jack Skille	Columbus Blue Jackets	1 year, $675,000
Tyson Strachan	Washington Capitals	1 year, $550,000
Nolan Yonkman	Anaheim Ducks	1 year, $600,000

=== Claimed via waivers ===
Player	Former team	Date claimed off waivers

=== Lost via waivers ===
Player	New team	Date claimed off waivers

=== Lost via retirement ===
Player

=== Player signings ===
Player	Date	Contract terms
Shawn Matthias	July 5, 2013	2 years, $3.5 million
Aleksander Barkov	July 15, 2013	3 years, $2.775 million entry-level contract
Jacob Markstrom	July 15, 2013	2 years, $2.4 million
Michael Caruso	July 16, 2013	1 year, $650,000
Greg Rallo	July 16, 2013	1 year, $600,000
Colby Robak	July 22, 2013	2 years, $1.35 million
Scott Timmins	July 24, 2013	1 year, $600,000
Brad Boyes	March 5, 2014	2 years, $5.25 million contract extension
Connor Brickley	April 21, 2014	2 years, $1.185 million entry-level contract
Rocco Grimaldi	May 7, 2014	3 years, $3.2 million entry-level contract
MacKenzie Weegar	May 29, 2014	3 years, $2.4 million entry-level contract
Steven Hodges	June 1, 2014	3 years, $2.55 million entry-level contract

== Draft picks ==
Florida Panthers' picks at the 2013 NHL entry draft, which was held in Newark, New Jersey on June 30, 2013.

Round	#	Player	Pos	Nationality	College/Junior/Club team (League)
1	2	Aleksander Barkov	Center	Finland	Tappara (SM-liiga)
2	31	Ian McCoshen	Defense	United States	Waterloo Black Hawks (USHL)
4	92	Evan Cowley	Goaltender	United States	Wichita Falls Wildcats (NAHL)
4	97^{[a]}	Michael Downing	Defense	United States	Dubuque Fighting Saints (USHL)
4	98^{[b]}	Matt Buckles	Center	Canada	St. Michael's Buzzers (OJHL)
5	122	Christopher Clapperton	Left wing	Canada	Blainville-Boisbriand Armada (QMJHL)
6	152	Josh Brown	Defense	Canada	Oshawa Generals (OHL)
7	206^{[c]}	MacKenzie Weegar	Defense	Canada	Halifax Mooseheads (QMJHL)

Draft notes

- The Florida Panthers' third-round pick went to the New York Rangers as the result of a February 25, 2012, trade that sent Wojtek Wolski to the Panthers in exchange for Michael Vernace and this pick.
- ^{a} The Calgary Flames' fourth-round pick went to the Florida Panthers as the result of a trade on June 18, 2013, that sent Corban Knight to Calgary in exchange for this pick.
- ^{b} The Edmonton Oilers' fourth-round pick went to the Florida Panthers as a result of an April 3, 2013, trade that sent Jerred Smithson to the Oilers in exchange for this pick.
- The Florida Panthers' seventh-round pick went to the Dallas Stars as the result of a June 23, 2012, trade that sent a 2012 seventh-round pick (#194–Jonatan Nielsen) to the Panthers in exchange for this pick.
- ^{c} The Montreal Canadiens' seventh-round pick went to the Florida Panthers as a result of a June 30, 2013, trade that sent a 2014 seventh-round pick to the Canadiens in exchange for this pick.
