= 2013–14 Phoenix Coyotes season =

NHL hockey team season

2013–14 Phoenix Coyotes
- Division: 4th Pacific
- Conference: 9th Western
- 2013–14 record: 37–30–15
- Home record: 22–14–5
- Road record: 15–16–10
- Goals for: 216
- Goals against: 231

Team information
- General manager: Don Maloney
- Coach: Dave Tippett
- Captain: Shane Doan
- Alternate captains: Martin Hanzal; Keith Yandle
- Arena: Jobing.com Arena
- Average attendance: 13,775 (86.9%) (41 games)
- Minor league affiliates: Portland Pirates (AHL); Gwinnett Gladiators (ECHL); Arizona Sundogs (CHL)

Team leaders
- Goals: Antoine Vermette (24)
- Assists: Keith Yandle (45)
- Points: Keith Yandle (53)
- Penalty minutes: Martin Hanzal (73)
- Plus/minus: Paul Bissonnette; Rob Klinkhammer; Zbynek Michalek (+6)
- Wins: Mike Smith (27)
- Goals against average: Thomas Greiss (2.29)

The 2013–14 Phoenix Coyotes season was the franchise's 35th season in the National Hockey League (NHL), the 18th in Arizona and the 42nd overall, including the seasons the franchise played in the World Hockey Association. The Coyotes finished the season situated ninth in the Western Conference, missing the Stanley Cup playoffs for the second consecutive year.

This was the team's final season as the "Phoenix Coyotes"; as part of the deal approved by the City of Glendale to keep the team in the city on July 2, the franchise had agreed to change its name from the Phoenix Coyotes to the Arizona Coyotes for the 2014–15 season.

As a result of realignment, this was the first season in which the franchise had the Calgary Flames, Edmonton Oilers and Vancouver Canucks as division rivals since the 1992–93 season, when the team was still known as the Winnipeg Jets and the Pacific Division was called the Smythe Division. During that era (in which the top four teams in each division made the playoffs and played each other in the first two rounds), the Jets had intense rivalries with the Flames, Oilers and Canucks.

== Off-season ==
After years of relocation rumors and speculation, the Coyotes were sold to IceArizona AcquisitionCo., LLC on August 5, 2013, keeping the Coyotes in Glendale, Arizona.

== Standings ==
Pacific Division
| Pos | Team | GP | W | L | OTL | ROW | GF | GA | GD | Pts |
|---|---|---|---|---|---|---|---|---|---|---|
| 1 | y – Anaheim Ducks | 82 | 54 | 20 | 8 | 51 | 266 | 209 | +57 | 116 |
| 2 | x – San Jose Sharks | 82 | 51 | 22 | 9 | 41 | 249 | 200 | +49 | 111 |
| 3 | x – Los Angeles Kings | 82 | 46 | 28 | 8 | 38 | 206 | 174 | +32 | 100 |
| 4 | Phoenix Coyotes | 82 | 37 | 30 | 15 | 31 | 216 | 231 | −15 | 89 |
| 5 | Vancouver Canucks | 82 | 36 | 35 | 11 | 31 | 196 | 223 | −27 | 83 |
| 6 | Calgary Flames | 82 | 35 | 40 | 7 | 28 | 209 | 241 | −32 | 77 |
| 7 | Edmonton Oilers | 82 | 29 | 44 | 9 | 25 | 203 | 270 | −67 | 67 |

Source: National Hockey League
x – Clinched playoff spot; y – Clinched division

Western Conference Wild Card
| Pos | Div | Team | GP | W | L | OTL | ROW | GF | GA | GD | Pts |
|---|---|---|---|---|---|---|---|---|---|---|---|
| 1 | CE | x – Minnesota Wild | 82 | 43 | 27 | 12 | 35 | 207 | 206 | +1 | 98 |
| 2 | CE | x – Dallas Stars | 82 | 40 | 31 | 11 | 36 | 235 | 228 | +7 | 91 |
| 3 | PA | Phoenix Coyotes | 82 | 37 | 30 | 15 | 31 | 216 | 231 | −15 | 89 |
| 4 | CE | Nashville Predators | 82 | 38 | 32 | 12 | 36 | 216 | 242 | −26 | 88 |
| 5 | CE | Winnipeg Jets | 82 | 37 | 35 | 10 | 29 | 227 | 237 | −10 | 84 |
| 6 | PA | Vancouver Canucks | 82 | 36 | 35 | 11 | 31 | 196 | 223 | −27 | 83 |
| 7 | PA | Calgary Flames | 82 | 35 | 40 | 7 | 28 | 209 | 241 | −32 | 77 |
| 8 | PA | Edmonton Oilers | 82 | 29 | 44 | 9 | 25 | 203 | 270 | −67 | 67 |

Source: National Hockey League
x – Clinched playoff spot

== Schedule and results ==
=== Pre-season ===
2013 preseason game log: 4–2–1 (Home: 2–0–0; Road: 2–2–1)
| # | Date | Visitor | Score | Home | OT | Decision | Attendance | Record | Recap |
|---|---|---|---|---|---|---|---|---|---|
| 1 | September 15 | Los Angeles | 2–4 | Phoenix | | Smith | 6,270 | 1–0–0 | Recap |
| 2 | September 15 | Phoenix | 5–1 | Los Angeles | | Greiss | 12,988 | 2–0–0 | Recap |
| 3 | September 16 | Phoenix | 2–6 | Anaheim | | Visentin | 11,541 | 2–1–0 | Recap |
| 4 | September 21 | Phoenix | 2–3 | San Jose | OT | Smith | 15,841 | 2–1–1 | Recap |
| 5 | September 23 | Phoenix | 1–6 | Vancouver | | Greiss | 18,910 | 2–2–1 | Recap |
| 6 | September 25 | Phoenix | 3–2 | Calgary | OT | Smith | 19,289 | 3–2–1 | Recap |
| 7 | September 27 | San Jose | 1–2 | Phoenix | | Greiss | 7,757 | 4–2–1 | Recap |

=== Regular season ===
2013–14 Game Log

October: 9–3–2 (Home: 6–0–1; Road: 3–3–1)
| # | Date | Visitor | Score | Home | OT | Decision | Attendance | Record | Pts | Recap |
|---|---|---|---|---|---|---|---|---|---|---|
| 1 | October 3 | NY Rangers | 1–4 | Phoenix | | Smith | 17,125 | 1–0–0 | 2 | Recap |
| 2 | October 5 | Phoenix | 1–4 | San Jose | | Smith | 17,562 | 1–1–0 | 2 | Recap |
| 3 | October 8 | Phoenix | 1–6 | NY Islanders | | Smith | 10,288 | 1–2–0 | 2 | Recap |
| 4 | October 10 | Phoenix | 4–2 | Detroit | | Smith | 20,066 | 2–2–0 | 4 | Recap |
| 5 | October 11 | Phoenix | 2–1 | Philadelphia | | Greiss | 19,713 | 3–2–0 | 6 | Recap |
| 6 | October 13 | Phoenix | 5–3 | Carolina | | Smith | 15,384 | 4–2–0 | 8 | Recap |
| 7 | October 15 | Ottawa | 4–3 | Phoenix | OT | Smith | 10,594 | 4–2–1 | 9 | Recap |
| 8 | October 18 | Phoenix | 2–3 | Anaheim | SO | Smith | 13,206 | 4–2–2 | 10 | Recap |
| 9 | October 19 | Detroit | 2–5 | Phoenix | | Smith | 14,624 | 5–2–2 | 12 | Recap |
| 10 | October 22 | Calgary | 2–4 | Phoenix | | Smith | 10,141 | 6–2–2 | 14 | Recap |
| 11 | October 24 | Phoenix | 4–7 | Los Angeles | | Greiss | 18,118 | 6–3–2 | 14 | Recap |
| 12 | October 26 | Edmonton | 4–5 | Phoenix | | Smith | 11,684 | 7–3–2 | 16 | Recap |
| 13 | October 29 | Los Angeles | 1–3 | Phoenix | | Smith | 10,452 | 8–3–2 | 18 | Recap |
| 13 | October 31 | Nashville | 4–5 | Phoenix | SO | Greiss | 7,401 | 9–3–2 | 20 | Recap |

November: 6–4–2 (Home: 3–2–1; Road: 3–2–1)
| # | Date | Visitor | Score | Home | OT | Decision | Attendance | Record | Pts | Recap |
|---|---|---|---|---|---|---|---|---|---|---|
| 15 | November 2 | Phoenix | 3–2 | San Jose | SO | Smith | 17,562 | 10–3–2 | 22 | Recap |
| 16 | November 5 | Vancouver | 2–3 | Phoenix | SO | Smith | 13,459 | 11–3–2 | 24 | Recap |
| 17 | November 6 | Phoenix | 2–5 | Anaheim | | Smith | 14,045 | 11–4–2 | 24 | Recap |
| 18 | November 9 | Washington | 3–4 | Phoenix | SO | Smith | 16,106 | 12–4–2 | 26 | Recap |
| 19 | November 12 | Phoenix | 3–2 | St. Louis | OT | Smith | 15,678 | 13–4–2 | 28 | Recap |
| 20 | November 14 | Phoenix | 4–5 | Chicago | SO | Smith | 21,762 | 13–4–3 | 29 | Recap |
| 21 | November 16 | Tampa Bay | 3–6 | Phoenix | | Smith | 12,562 | 14–4–3 | 31 | Recap |
| 22 | November 21 | Colorado | 4–3 | Phoenix | OT | Smith | 12,285 | 14–4–4 | 32 | Recap |
| 23 | November 23 | Anaheim | 4–2 | Phoenix | | Smith | 13,490 | 14–5–4 | 32 | Recap |
| 24 | November 25 | Phoenix | 2–4 | Nashville | | Smith | 15,728 | 14–6–4 | 32 | Recap |
| 25 | November 27 | Phoenix | 3–1 | Minnesota | | Greiss | 18,265 | 15–6–4 | 34 | Recap |
| 26 | November 30 | Chicago | 5–2 | Phoenix | | Smith | 17,321 | 15–7–4 | 34 | Recap |

December: 5–3–5 (Home: 2–1–1; Road: 3–2–4)
| # | Date | Visitor | Score | Home | OT | Decision | Attendance | Record | Pts | Recap |
|---|---|---|---|---|---|---|---|---|---|---|
| 27 | December 3 | Phoenix | 6–2 | Edmonton | | Smith | 16,839 | 16–7–4 | 36 | Recap |
| 28 | December 4 | Phoenix | 1–4 | Calgary | | Greiss | 19,289 | 16–8–4 | 36 | Recap |
| 29 | December 6 | Phoenix | 2–3 | Vancouver | OT | Smith | 18,910 | 16–8–5 | 37 | Recap |
| 30 | December 10 | Phoenix | 3–1 | Colorado | | Greiss | 14,110 | 17–8–5 | 39 | Recap |
| 31 | December 12 | NY Islanders | 3–6 | Phoenix | | Smith | 10,996 | 18–8–5 | 41 | Recap |
| 32 | December 14 | Carolina | 3–1 | Phoenix | | Smith | 11,697 | 18–9–5 | 41 | Recap |
| 33 | December 17 | Phoenix | 1–3 | Montreal | | Smith | 21,273 | 18–10–5 | 41 | Recap |
| 34 | December 19 | Phoenix | 1–2 | Toronto | SO | Smith | 19,254 | 18–10–6 | 42 | Recap |
| 35 | December 21 | Phoenix | 4–3 | Ottawa | OT | Smith | 16,716 | 19–10–6 | 44 | Recap |
| 36 | December 23 | Phoenix | 1–2 | Buffalo | OT | Smith | 18,942 | 19–10–7 | 45 | Recap |
| 37 | December 27 | San Jose | 4–3 | Phoenix | SO | Smith | 17,125 | 19–10–8 | 46 | Recap |
| 38 | December 28 | Phoenix | 2–3 | Anaheim | OT | Greiss | 17,442 | 19–10–9 | 47 | Recap |
| 39 | December 31 | Edmonton | 3–4 | Phoenix | OT | Greiss | 17,416 | 20–10–9 | 49 | Recap |

January: 5–9–1 (Home: 4–6–0; Road: 1–3–1)
| # | Date | Visitor | Score | Home | OT | Decision | Attendance | Record | Pts | Recap |
|---|---|---|---|---|---|---|---|---|---|---|
| 40 | January 2 | Columbus | 2–0 | Phoenix | | Smith | 10,539 | 20–11–9 | 49 | Recap |
| 41 | January 4 | Philadelphia | 5–3 | Phoenix | | Smith | 14,875 | 20–12–9 | 49 | Recap |
| 42 | January 7 | Calgary | 0–6 | Phoenix | | Greiss | 10,229 | 21–12–9 | 51 | Recap |
| 43 | January 9 | Minnesota | 4–1 | Phoenix | | Smith | 10,075 | 21–13–9 | 51 | Recap |
| 44 | January 11 | Anaheim | 5–3 | Phoenix | | Greiss | 13,289 | 21–14–9 | 51 | Recap |
| 45 | January 13 | Phoenix | 1–5 | Winnipeg | | Smith | 15,004 | 21–15–9 | 51 | Recap |
| 46 | January 14 | Phoenix | 1–2 | St. Louis | | Smith | 16,571 | 21–16–9 | 51 | Recap |
| 47 | January 16 | Vancouver | 0–1 | Phoenix | | Smith | 12,307 | 22–16–9 | 53 | Recap |
| 48 | January 18 | New Jersey | 2–3 | Phoenix | | Smith | 14,005 | 23–16–9 | 55 | Recap |
| 49 | January 20 | Toronto | 4–2 | Phoenix | | Smith | 14,476 | 23–17–9 | 55 | Recap |
| 50 | January 22 | Phoenix | 2–3 | Calgary | | Smith | 19,289 | 23–18–9 | 55 | Recap |
| 51 | January 24 | Phoenix | 4–3 | Edmonton | | Smith | 16,839 | 24–18–9 | 57 | Recap |
| 52 | January 26 | Phoenix | 4–5 | Vancouver | OT | Smith | 18,910 | 24–18–10 | 58 | Recap |
| 53 | January 28 | Los Angeles | 0–3 | Phoenix | | Greiss | 13,681 | 25–18–10 | 60 | Recap |
| 54 | January 30 | Buffalo | 3–2 | Phoenix | | Greiss | 13,000 | 25–19–10 | 60 | Recap |

February: 2–3–1 (Home: 2–1–0; Road: 0–2–1)
| # | Date | Visitor | Score | Home | OT | Decision | Attendance | Record | Pts | Recap |
|---|---|---|---|---|---|---|---|---|---|---|
| 55 | February 1 | Pittsburgh | 1–3 | Phoenix | | Smith | 17,362 | 26–19–10 | 62 | Recap |
| 56 | February 4 | Dallas | 3–1 | Phoenix | | Smith | 12,257 | 26–20–10 | 62 | Recap |
| 57 | February 7 | Chicago | 0–2 | Phoenix | | Smith | 17,525 | 27–20–10 | 64 | Recap |
| 58 | February 8 | Phoenix | 1–2 | Dallas | | Smith | 18,532 | 27–21–10 | 64 | Recap |
| 59 | February 27 | Phoenix | 2–3 | Winnipeg | SO | Smith | 15,004 | 27–21–11 | 65 | Recap |
| 60 | February 28 | Phoenix | 2–4 | Colorado | | Greiss | 17,649 | 27–22–11 | 65 | Recap |

March: 9–5–1 (Home: 4–3–0; Road: 5–2–1)
| # | Date | Visitor | Score | Home | OT | Decision | Attendance | Record | Pts | Recap |
|---|---|---|---|---|---|---|---|---|---|---|
| 61 | March 2 | St. Louis | 4–2 | Phoenix | | Smith | 13,955 | 27–23–11 | 65 | Recap |
| 62 | March 4 | Vancouver | 0–1 | Phoenix | | Smith | 13,449 | 28–23–11 | 67 | Recap |
| 63 | March 6 | Montreal | 2–5 | Phoenix | | Smith | 15,282 | 29–23–11 | 69 | Recap |
| 64 | March 8 | Phoenix | 2–3 | Washington | | Smith | 18,506 | 29–24–11 | 69 | Recap |
| 65 | March 10 | Phoenix | 4–3 | Tampa Bay | SO | Smith | 18,167 | 30–24–11 | 71 | Recap |
| 66 | March 11 | Phoenix | 3–1 | Florida | | Smith | 12,211 | 31–24–11 | 73 | Recap |
| 67 | March 13 | Phoenix | 1–2 | Boston | | Smith | 17,565 | 31–25–11 | 73 | Recap |
| 68 | March 15 | Calgary | 2–3 | Phoenix | | Smith | 16,373 | 32–25–11 | 75 | Recap |
| 69 | March 17 | Phoenix | 4–3 | Los Angeles | | Smith | 18,118 | 33–25–11 | 77 | Recap |
| 70 | March 20 | Florida | 1–2 | Phoenix | | Smith | 14,442 | 34–25–11 | 79 | Recap |
| 71 | March 22 | Boston | 4–2 | Phoenix | | Smith | 17,468 | 34–26–11 | 79 | Recap |
| 72 | March 24 | Phoenix | 3–4 | NY Rangers | OT | Greiss | 18,006 | 34–26–12 | 80 | Recap |
| 73 | March 25 | Phoenix | 3–2 | Pittsburgh | | Greiss | 18,632 | 35–26–12 | 82 | Recap |
| 74 | March 27 | Phoenix | 3–2 | New Jersey | SO | Greiss | 15,583 | 36–26–12 | 84 | Recap |
| 75 | March 29 | Minnesota | 3–1 | Phoenix | | Greiss | 16,691 | 36–27–12 | 84 | Recap |

April: 1–3–3 (Home: 1–1–2; Road: 0–2–1)
| # | Date | Visitor | Score | Home | OT | Decision | Attendance | Record | Pts | Recap |
|---|---|---|---|---|---|---|---|---|---|---|
| 76 | April 1 | Winnipeg | 2–1 | Phoenix | SO | Greiss | 13,724 | 36–27–13 | 85 | Recap |
| 77 | April 2 | Phoenix | 0–4 | Los Angeles | | Greiss | 18,118 | 36–28–13 | 85 | Recap |
| 78 | April 4 | Edmonton | 3–2 | Phoenix | SO | Greiss | 14,732 | 36–28–14 | 86 | Recap |
| 79 | April 8 | Phoenix | 3–4 | Columbus | OT | Greiss | 16,289 | 36–28–15 | 87 | Recap |
| 80 | April 10 | Phoenix | 0–2 | Nashville | | Greiss | 17,174 | 36–29–15 | 87 | Recap |
| 81 | April 12 | San Jose | 3–2 | Phoenix | | Visentin | 15,438 | 36–30–15 | 87 | Recap |
| 82 | April 13 | Dallas | 1–2 | Phoenix | | Greiss | 15,146 | 37–30–15 | 89 | Recap |

Legend: Win (2 points) Loss (0 points) Overtime/shootout loss (1 point)

== Playoffs ==
For the second consecutive year, the Coyotes failed to make the playoffs.

== Player statistics ==
Final Stats

Skaters

Regular season
| Player | GP | G | A | Pts | +/− | PIM |
|---|---|---|---|---|---|---|
| Keith Yandle | 82 | 8 | 45 | 53 | −23 | 63 |
| Radim Vrbata | 80 | 20 | 31 | 51 | −6 | 22 |
| Mikkel Boedker | 82 | 19 | 32 | 51 | −9 | 20 |
| Shane Doan | 69 | 23 | 24 | 47 | −7 | 34 |
| Mike Ribeiro | 80 | 16 | 31 | 47 | −13 | 52 |
| Antoine Vermette | 82 | 24 | 21 | 45 | 0 | 44 |
| Oliver Ekman-Larsson | 80 | 15 | 29 | 44 | −4 | 50 |
| Martin Hanzal | 65 | 15 | 25 | 40 | −9 | 73 |
| Lauri Korpikoski | 64 | 9 | 16 | 25 | −7 | 24 |
| David Moss | 79 | 8 | 14 | 22 | −1 | 18 |
| Michael Stone | 70 | 8 | 13 | 21 | −10 | 38 |
| Rob Klinkhammer | 72 | 11 | 9 | 20 | 6 | 19 |
| Kyle Chipchura | 80 | 5 | 15 | 20 | 3 | 45 |
| Derek Morris | 63 | 5 | 12 | 17 | −2 | 41 |
| Jeff Halpern | 69 | 5 | 7 | 12 | −8 | 24 |
| Zbynek Michalek | 59 | 2 | 8 | 10 | 6 | 24 |
| David Schlemko | 48 | 1 | 8 | 9 | 2 | 18 |
| Paul Bissonnette | 39 | 2 | 6 | 8 | 6 | 53 |
| Tim Kennedy | 37 | 2 | 6 | 8 | 0 | 4 |
| Connor Murphy | 30 | 1 | 7 | 8 | 5 | 10 |
| Brandon McMillan | 22 | 2 | 4 | 6 | 0 | 4 |
| Martin Erat^{†} | 17 | 2 | 3 | 5 | 4 | 6 |
| Rostislav Klesla^{‡} | 25 | 1 | 3 | 4 | −3 | 24 |
| Jordan Szwarz | 26 | 3 | 0 | 3 | −6 | 19 |
| Chris Summers | 18 | 2 | 1 | 3 | 0 | 15 |
| Andy Miele | 7 | 0 | 2 | 2 | 4 | 5 |
| David Rundblad^{‡} | 12 | 0 | 1 | 1 | −3 | 6 |
| Brandon Yip | 2 | 0 | 0 | 0 | 0 | 0 |
| Brandon Gormley | 5 | 0 | 0 | 0 | 4 | 2 |
| Lucas Lessio | 3 | 0 | 0 | 0 | −2 | 2 |
| Chris Brown^{‡} | 6 | 0 | 0 | 0 | 0 | 17 |

Goaltenders

Regular season
| Player | GP | GS | TOI | W | L | OT | GA | GAA | SA | SV% | SO | G | A | PIM |
|---|---|---|---|---|---|---|---|---|---|---|---|---|---|---|
| Mike Smith | 62 | 61 | 3,609:58 | 27 | 21 | 10 | 159 | 2.64 | 1871 | .915 | 3 | 1 | 3 | 14 |
| Thomas Greiss | 25 | 20 | 1,312:20 | 10 | 8 | 5 | 50 | 2.29 | 626 | .920 | 2 | 0 | 0 | 0 |
| Mark Visentin | 1 | 1 | 58:49 | 0 | 1 | 0 | 3 | 3.05 | 32 | .906 | 0 | 0 | 0 | 0 |

^{†}Denotes player spent time with another team before joining the Coyotes. Stats reflect time with the Coyotes only.
^{‡}Traded mid-season
Bold/italics denotes franchise record

== Transactions ==
The Coyotes have been involved in the following transactions during the 2013–14 season.

=== Trades ===
| June 30, 2013 | To New Jersey Devils 2nd-round pick (42nd overall) in 2013; 3rd-round pick in 2013 | To Phoenix Coyotes 2nd-round pick (39th overall) in 2013 |
| March 4, 2014 | To Chicago Blackhawks David Rundblad; Mathieu Brisebois | To Phoenix Coyotes 2nd-round pick in 2014 |
| March 4, 2014 | To Washington Capitals Chris Brown; Rostislav Klesla; 4th-round pick in 2015 | To Phoenix Coyotes Martin Erat; John Mitchell |

=== Free agents acquired ===
| Player | Former team | Contract terms |
| Thomas Greiss | San Jose Sharks | 1 year, $750,000 |
| Mike Ribeiro | Washington Capitals | 4 years, $22 million |
| Tim Kennedy | San Jose Sharks | 1 year, $700,000 |
| Brandon Yip | Nashville Predators | 1 year, $675,000 |
| Jeff Halpern | Montreal Canadiens | 1 year, $600,000 |
| Tyler Gaudet | Sault Ste. Marie Greyhounds | 3 years, $2.775 million entry-level contract |
| Gilbert Brule | Portland Pirates | 1 year, $685,000 |
| Greg Carey | St. Lawrence University | 1 year, $1.1375 million entry-level contract |
| Dan O'Donoghue | Mercyhurst College | 2 years, $1.27 million entry-level contract |

=== Free agents lost ===
| Player | New team | Contract terms |
| Boyd Gordon | Edmonton Oilers | 3 years, $9 million |
| Jason LaBarbera | Edmonton Oilers | 1 year, $1 million |
| Alexandre Bolduc | St. Louis Blues | 1 year, $550,000 |
| Chris Conner | Pittsburgh Penguins | 1 year, $550,000 |
| Chad Johnson | Boston Bruins | 1 year, $600,000 |
| Nick Johnson | Boston Bruins | 1 year, $600,000 |

=== Player signings ===
| Player | Date | Contract terms |
| Mike Smith | July 1, 2013 | 6 years, $34 million |
| Kyle Chipchura | July 5, 2013 | 3 years, $2.625 million |
| Chris Summers | July 5, 2013 | 1 year, $550,000 |
| Michael Stone | July 5, 2013 | 3 years, $3.45 million |
| Andy Miele | July 9, 2013 | 1 year, $675,000 |
| Lauri Korpikoski | July 11, 2013 | 4 years, $10 million |
| Max Domi | July 14, 2013 | 3 years, $2.775 million entry-level contract |
| David Rundblad | July 22, 2013 | 2 years, $1.57 million |
| Brandon McMillan | July 22, 2013 | 1 year, $709,500 |
| Mark Louis | July 22, 2013 | 2 years, $1.1 million |
| Mathieu Brodeur | July 22, 2013 | 1 year, $605,000 |
| Brett Hextall | July 22, 2013 | 1 year, $687,500 |
| Mikkel Boedker | September 7, 2013 | 2 years, $5.1 million |
| Justin Hache | April 7, 2014 | 3 years, $2.085 million entry-level contract |
| Marek Langhamer | May 8, 2014 | 3 years, $1.945 million entry-level contract |
| Chris Summers | May 12, 2014 | 2 years, $1.2 million contract extension |

== Draft picks ==
Phoenix Coyotes' picks at the 2013 NHL entry draft, that was held in Newark, New Jersey on June 30, 2013.

| Round | # | Player | Pos | Nationality | College/Junior/Club team (League) |
|---|---|---|---|---|---|
| 1 | 12 | Max Domi | C | Canada | London Knights (OHL) |
| 2 | 39^{[a]} | Laurent Dauphin | C | Canada | Chicoutimi Saguenéens (QMJHL) |
| 3 | 62^{[b]} | Yan-Pavel Laplante | C | Canada | P.E.I. Rocket (QMJHL) |
| 5 | 133 | Connor Clifton | D | United States | U.S. National Team Development Program (USHL) |
| 6 | 163 | Brendan Burke | G | United States | Portland Winterhawks (WHL) |
| 7 | 193 | Jedd Soleway | C | Canada | Penticton Vees (BCHL) |

Draft notes

- ^{a} The New Jersey Devils' second-round pick went to the Phoenix Coyotes as the result of a trade on June 30, 2013, that sent second and third-round picks in 2013 (42nd and 73rd overall) to New Jersey in exchange for this pick.
- ^{b} The Florida Panthers' third-round pick went to the Phoenix Coyotes (via NY Rangers and San Jose) as a result of an April 3, 2013, trade that sent Raffi Torres to the Sharks in exchange for this pick.
- The Phoenix Coyotes' fourth-round pick went to the Los Angeles Kings (via Columbus and Philadelphia), Phoenix traded this pick to the Columbus Blue Jackets as the result of a February 22, 2012, trade that sent Antoine Vermette to the Coyotes in exchange for Curtis McElhinney, a 2012 second-round pick and this pick.
