= 2013–14 Calgary Flames season =

NHL team season

2013–14 Calgary Flames
- Division: 6th Pacific
- Conference: 13th Western
- 2013–14 record: 35–40–7
- Home record: 19–19–3
- Road record: 16–21–4
- Goals for: 209
- Goals against: 241

Team information
- General manager: Jay Feaster (Oct. – Dec. 12); Brian Burke (interim)
- Coach: Bob Hartley
- Captain: Mark Giordano
- Alternate captains: Michael Cammalleri; Curtis Glencross
- Arena: Scotiabank Saddledome
- Average attendance: 19,289 (100%)
- Minor league affiliates: Abbotsford Heat (AHL); Alaska Aces (ECHL)

Team leaders
- Goals: Michael Cammalleri (26)
- Assists: Jiri Hudler (37)
- Points: Jiri Hudler (54)
- Penalty minutes: Brian McGrattan (100)
- Plus/minus: Mark Giordano (+12)
- Wins: Karri Ramo (17)
- Goals against average: Joni Ortio (2.51)

The 2013–14 Calgary Flames season was the 34th season in City of Calgary and 42nd for the Flames franchise in the National Hockey League (NHL). It was the first season of a rebuilding phase, and the first full year following the departure of long-time captain Jarome Iginla and goaltender Miikka Kiprusoff. Mark Giordano replaced Iginla as team captain. The Flames also began the year in a new division as they returned to the Pacific Division following a league-wide realignment. Change continued into the playing season as new team president Brian Burke fired general manager Jay Feaster on December 12, 2013, and assumed the role himself on an interim basis.

Calgary's home arena, the Scotiabank Saddledome, suffered significant damage over the summer during widespread flooding that inundated the land around the arena. The facility was repaired in time for the playing season, a year in which the Flames were widely predicted to finish in last place in the Pacific Division. Calgary finished the year with a 35–40–7 record to finish sixth in the seven-team division and failed to qualify for the playoffs for the fifth consecutive season. The team's top selection at the 2013 NHL entry draft, Sean Monahan, made the squad as an 18-year-old and finished second in team goal scoring with 22 goals. Michael Cammalleri led with 26 goals, while Jiri Hudler was the team leader in assists (37) and points (54). Karri Ramo was one of four goaltenders to appear for Calgary, and led the team with 17 wins.

== Off-season ==
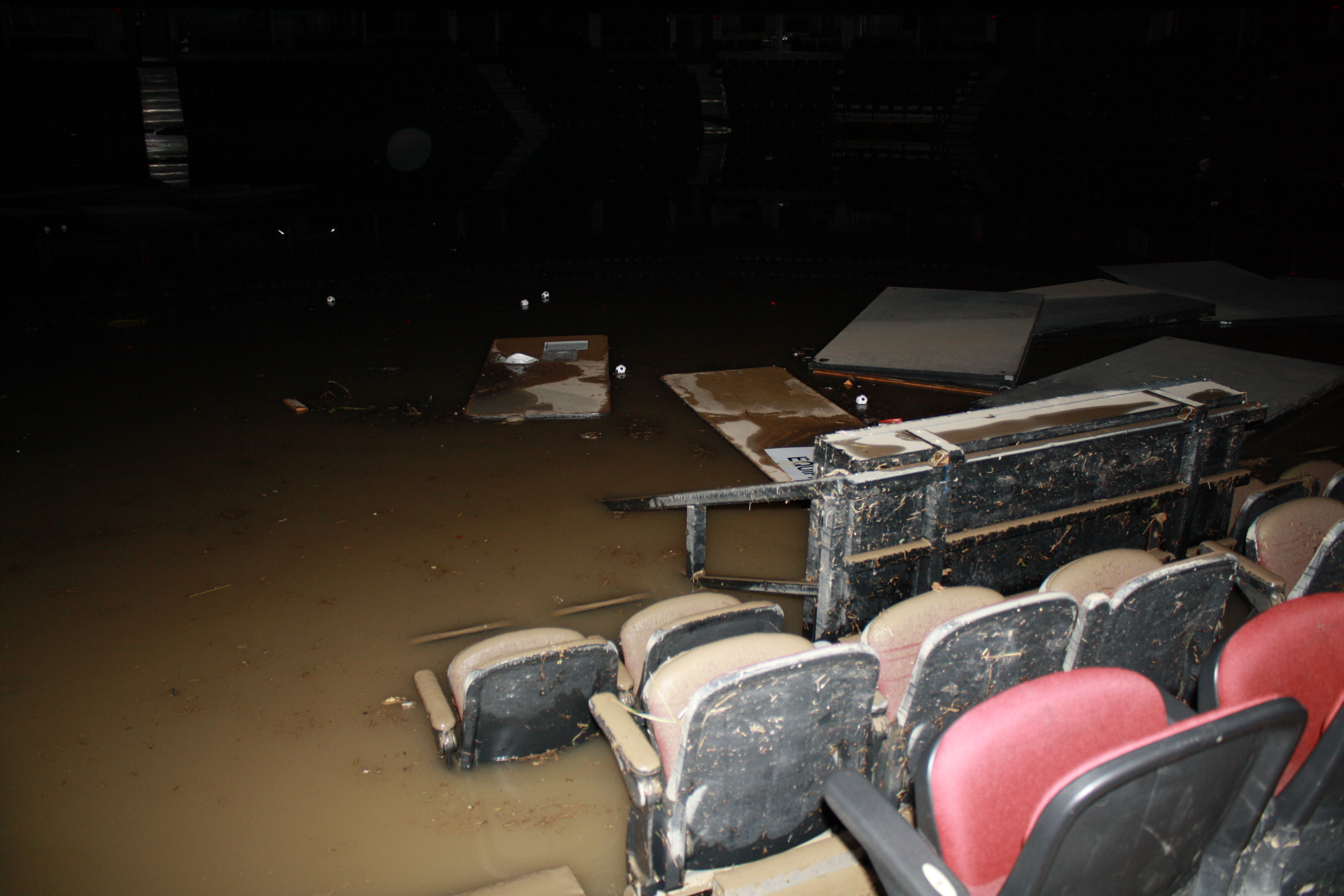
The Flames released images showing the extent of the flooding of the lower bowl

The Scotiabank Saddledome was one of many buildings impacted by the 2013 Alberta floods. The flooding of the Elbow and Bow Rivers swamped many areas of the city, including Stampede Park where the Saddledome is located. The event level of the arena was reported to be filled with water up to the 10th row of seating and the dressing rooms and control room for the video replay screen were under water. At a press conference held on June 22, 2013, team president Ken King stated that the arena had flooded up to the eighth row and that the event level of the facility was a "total loss." He added that the team's equipment and some memorabilia had also been destroyed, but expressed confidence that the facility would be repaired and ready in time for the October start to the season. Prospect Ben Hanowski was among the 100,000 people forced to evacuate by the floods. He described the situation as "almost terrifying," but praised the city's community spirit in the disaster: "I didn't know how I was going to get [out of downtown]. I didn't know if I could get a rental car out of the garage and through some water to get up here, and I had a person come up to me right away and ask if I had a place to go and if I had a way to get there and basically offered me a ride somewhere. I'd never met the person before. I think that example, right there, kind of speaks to what the city of Calgary is all about."

Crews worked around the clock to repair the facility; Saddledome director of building operations Robert Blanchard estimated that 650,000-man hours of work was performed on the facility and noted that they had compressed a six-month project into two. The facility was granted its occupancy permit and allowed to reopen in late August. The first hockey game following the building's reopening was a Flames pre-season contest on September 14.

The Flames restructured their hockey operations department at the start of September, as Brian Burke was brought into the organization in the newly created position of president of hockey operations. general manager Jay Feaster reported to Burke, while Ken King was elevated to president and CEO of Calgary Sports and Entertainment, the corporation that controls the Flames, Calgary Hitmen, Calgary Roughnecks, Calgary Stampeders and Abbotsford Heat. On the ice, Mark Giordano was named the 19th captain in Flames' franchise history, succeeding Jarome Iginla, who was traded during the previous season.

== Regular season ==
=== October–November ===
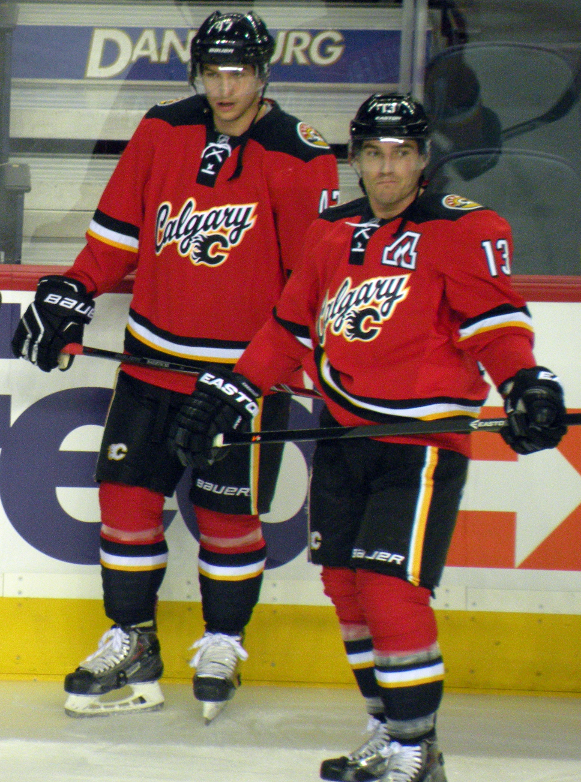
Sven Baertschi and Michael Cammalleri wearing the Flames' new third jerseys.

Realignment resulted in the Flames shifting from the defunct Northwest Division to the Pacific Division. Calgary, along with former Northwest rivals the Edmonton Oilers and Vancouver Canucks, joined the Anaheim Ducks, Los Angeles Kings, Phoenix Coyotes and San Jose Sharks in the expanded Pacific. Entering a rebuilding phase, the season began with low expectations for the Flames. The Hockey News predicted the team would finish last in the Division, a prediction shared by the Calgary media. The campaign began in Washington on October 3, a 5–4 shootout loss in which the team's top selection at the 2013 NHL entry draft, Sean Monahan, made his debut and scored his first point. Monahan scored his first career goal the following night against the Columbus Blue Jackets in the Flames' first win of the season, a 4–3 triumph. The team continued to defy expectations throughout the first two weeks of the season, adding two wins and an overtime loss to stand at 3–0–2. It was the first time since the franchise arrived in Calgary that it was unbeaten in regulation time after five games.

A five-game western road trip in mid October brought the Flames back to .500 as they won only a single game against four losses, evening their record at 4–4–2. Jiri Hudler, who began the season by scoring at least one point in the first nine games of the season, had his streak ended by the Dallas Stars in a 5–1 loss on October 24. The game against the Stars was also Monahan's tenth of the season. He was eligible to return to junior without the season counting against his professional contract prior to playing his tenth game, but he earned a spot with the team for the full season by scoring six goals and adding three assists in his first nine NHL games.

Injuries to key players mounted into November as Giordano (broken ankle), Lee Stempniak (broken foot) and Curtis Glencross (MCL sprain) each suffered injuries that forced them out of the lineup for several weeks. The team continued to struggle on the ice throughout November, losing six consecutive games including a loss to the Edmonton Oilers that saw the team surrender four third period goals en route to a 4–2 loss that left Flames players "frustrated" at their inability to hold a two-goal lead. The losing streak came to an end on November 18 with a 5–4 shootout victory over the Winnipeg Jets. Monahan scored the winner in his first career shootout attempt, and also scored the shootout winning goal two games later in a 4–3 win over the Florida Panthers.

The Flames' injury problems worsened in a November 27 loss to the Chicago Blackhawks (3–2; Chicago scored the winning goal in the final seconds of regulation time), as both Monahan and Dennis Wideman suffered broken bones in the contest. The Flames were left without their top two defencemen and two of their top six forwards. Captain Mark Giordano returned on December 4 after missing 18 games. During that time, the team earned only five wins.

=== December–January ===
Jarome Iginla made his first return to Calgary on December 10, 2013, where the fans greeted him with a long standing ovation prior to the game as the Flames played a video tribute. Following the contest, a 2–1 Boston Bruins victory, Iginla was named the game's third star and took two laps around the rink to more cheers from the crowd.

On December 12, Brian Burke announced the decision to change the franchise's leadership structure. General Manager Jay Feaster and Assistant General Manager John Weisbrod were both dismissed, while Burke took over the general manager's duties on an interim basis while he conducted a search for a permanent replacement. The timing of the decision, in the middle of the season, surprised media and observers, but not the decision itself as it was widely believed that Feaster's tenure in Calgary was in doubt when Burke was hired. The same night, Curtis Glencross returned after missing 15 games, and TJ Galiardi after missing eight, as the Flames defeated the Carolina Hurricanes 2–1 in overtime.

The Flames remained plagued by injuries to key players, as Glencross suffered a second injury to his knee and defenceman Kris Russell also picked up a knee injury in a 4–3 loss to the Pittsburgh Penguins on December 21. Two nights later, the Flames responded with what Cammalleri called "a fun win" by defeating the St. Louis Blues 4–3 in a shootout. Mark Giordano tied the contest at 3–3 with only 4.2 seconds remaining in regulation time. The team ended 2013 with three consecutive losses on home ice as Calgary was shut out 2–0 by both Edmonton and Vancouver before dropping a 4–1 decision on New Year's Eve to the Philadelphia Flyers. Sean Monahan's goal in the second period broke the team's streak of 159 minutes, 35 seconds without scoring a goal. The Flames' offensive struggles continued into the new year as they were shut out in four of six games at home. The team set a franchise record for longest streak on home ice without a goal, going 196 minutes and 59 seconds between the goal against Philadelphia and Mikael Backlund's marker on January 11, 2014, against the Pittsburgh Penguins. The 2–1 defeat at the hands of the Penguins was Calgary's sixth consecutive loss at home. Calgary ended up on the right side of a shutout two nights later as Karri Ramo recorded the first of his NHL career in a 2–0 road victory over Carolina. The team set a franchise record for futility on home ice with their seventh consecutive loss, 5–2 to Winnipeg, at the Saddledome on January 16.

Facing another struggling team in the Vancouver Canucks two nights later, the Flames became embroiled in a large melee off the opening faceoff. A line brawl broke out two seconds into the game as all ten skaters became engaged in fights. Four players from each team were given game misconducts in a contest that ended with 204 penalty minutes handed out. Vancouver Head Coach John Tortorella was visibly upset with Flames Head Coach Bob Hartley for the lineup he began the game with and tried to engage the Calgary bench in a shouting match after the brawl, then attempted to enter the Flames' dressing room during the first intermission. The game, played in Vancouver, ended in a 3–2 shootout loss for Calgary. Hartley was assessed a $25,000 fine by the League as the NHL held him responsible for the initial fights while Tortorella was given a 15-day suspension for his actions.

The Flames finally ended their home losing streak with their first win at the Saddledome in eight contests with a 3–2 win over the Phoenix Coyotes on January 22, 2014. Calgary won a second consecutive home game two nights later as the team overcame a four-goal effort by former Flame Eric Nystrom to defeat the Nashville Predators 5–4 in a shootout. Three additional wins followed as the Flames won every contest of a five-game homestand for the first time in 17 years. The final game of the homestand was costly however, as Karri Ramo suffered an MCL injury that kept him out of the lineup until after the NHL's break for the 2014 Winter Olympics.

=== February–April ===
Two players represented their nations at the 2014 Olympics. Reto Berra joined with Anaheim's Jonas Hiller to form the goaltending duo for Switzerland. Berra appeared in one game, surrendering one goal in a loss. Ladislav Smid represented the Czech Republic, but countryman Jiri Hudler was left off the team despite being the third-leading scorer among Czech players in the NHL in a decision that was widely panned.

The end of the Olympic break led quickly into the NHL's March 5 trade deadline. Calgary made two deals, sending Reto Berra to the Colorado Avalanche and Lee Stempniak to the Pittsburgh Penguins for draft picks. Michael Cammalleri, a pending unrestricted free agent was expected to be traded, but remained with the Flames as the 1 pm MST deadline passed. The Flames also brought up several of their younger players from the Abbotsford Heat; goaltender Joni Ortio and forward Markus Granlund both made their NHL debuts on February 27, while centre Corban Knight was set to make his own debut on March 5. Tyler Wotherspoon made his NHL debut on March 7 after being recalled on an emergency basis following an injury to Dennis Wideman. Due to the number of call-ups, the Flames played eight rookies in the same game for the first time since December 10, 1996.

Also on March 7, the Flames fêted former star Joe Nieuwendyk as he was inducted into the team's "Forever a Flame" program. A former team captain, Niewuendyk was a 1985 draft pick of the Flames and was a member of the team's 1989 Stanley Cup championship squad. The evening included a banner raising ceremony as Nieuwendyk's #25 was honoured and raised to the Saddledome rafters. The Flames ended the night with a three-goal outburst late in their contest against the New York Islanders and secure a 4–3 victory. The Flames largest win of the season came on March 22 against the Oilers; the 8–1 score represented the largest margin of victory by the Flames in Edmonton in the history of the Battle of Alberta. Curtis Glencross recorded a hat-trick in the victory that also featured an emotional goal by Matt Stajan on a penalty shot. The goal was Stajan's first since the death of his newborn son, Emerson. He pointed to the sky after scoring and was embraced by his emotional teammates.

After winning two of three games in a homestand, the Flames traveled east for a five-game road trip. The first game, a 6–3 loss to the Ottawa Senators on March 30, officially eliminated Calgary from playoff contention. Sean Monahan scored his 20th goal of the season in the loss, becoming the first Flames rookie since Dion Phaneuf in 2005–06 and first rookie forward since Jarome Iginla in 1996–97, to reach the mark. Bryce Van Brabant, a late-season free agent signing out of the NCAA, played his first game with the club on April 1 against the Toronto Maple Leafs. He was the tenth Flame to make his NHL debut on the season, tying a franchise record set in 1997–98. The Flames also set a franchise record for most one-goal games as the 3–2 defeat was their 46th such game. At the time, the team had an overall record of 22–17–7. The Flames rebounded to win the final three games of the road trip, culminating with Ramo's second shutout of the season in a 1–0 victory over the New Jersey Devils.

The Flames returned to Calgary for their final two home games of the season, a victory against the Los Angeles Kings, and then a defeat to the Winnipeg Jets. Despite the 5–3 loss to Winnipeg, the team left the arena to a standing ovation from the Saddledome fans who expressed appreciation for the tenacity shown by the team throughout the season. Mark Giordano expressed the team's appreciation: "It was awesome. That's not the first time we've been cheered after a loss, but definitely being the last one, it was special."

The campaign concluded on April 13 with a road game in Vancouver, where Hartley and Tortorella again became the focus of controversy. During the game, a 5–1 in by the Canucks, Calgary's Paul Byron received a major penalty and game misconduct for a hit from behind on Henrik Sedin, who was taken off the ice on a stretcher and hospitalized for precautionary reasons. Tortorella criticized Hartley's behaviour while Sedin was being attended to but refused to elaborate on what Hartley did: "It's been a rough year, but it's embarrassing to coach against the guy across from me." Brian Burke defended his coach. He explained that Tortorella was apparently upset because Hartley was campaigning for a penalty against Vancouver as a result of the scrum that followed Byron's hit. Burke added that "our coach acted completely appropriately last night and Torts oughta keep his mouth shut."

== Post-season ==
With a final record of 35–40–7, the Flames finished sixth in the Pacific Division with 77 points and failed to qualify for the 2014 Stanley Cup playoffs. The team also finished 13th in the 14-team Western Conference, ten points ahead of the Edmonton Oilers. The Flames finished 27th overall in the NHL standings, and after their status was left unchanged in the draft lottery for the top pick, were confirmed as the fourth overall selection at the 2014 NHL entry draft. The team entered the draft with a new general manager as Brad Treliving, formerly the assistant general manager of the Phoenix Coyotes, was hired to serve as permanent replacement for Jay Feaster on April 28, 2014.

Peter Maher, the team's long-time radio play by play announcer, announced his retirement following the season. He joined the Flames prior to their inaugural season of 1980–81 and became the play by play announcer the following year. Maher never missed a game over the following 33 years and called 3,162 consecutive games. He was recognized by the Hockey Hall of Fame in 2006 when he was named recipient of the Foster Hewitt Memorial Award.

Several members of the team were invited to represent their nations at the 2014 IIHF World Championship. Both Mark Giordano and T. J. Brodie were invited to represent Canada, but declined due to lingering injuries. Sean Monahan, however, accepted his invitation. As did Jiri Hudler with the Czech Republic, Johnny Gaudreau with the United States and Mikael Backlund with Sweden. Prospect Sven Baertschi was added to the Swiss roster after his season with the AHL's Abbotsford Heat ended.

== Standings ==
Pacific Division
Pos	Team	GP	W	L	OTL	ROW	GF	GA	GD	Pts
1	y – Anaheim Ducks	82	54	20	8	51	266	209	+57	116
2	x – San Jose Sharks	82	51	22	9	41	249	200	+49	111
3	x – Los Angeles Kings	82	46	28	8	38	206	174	+32	100
4	Phoenix Coyotes	82	37	30	15	31	216	231	−15	89
5	Vancouver Canucks	82	36	35	11	31	196	223	−27	83
6	Calgary Flames	82	35	40	7	28	209	241	−32	77
7	Edmonton Oilers	82	29	44	9	25	203	270	−67	67

Source: National Hockey League
x – Clinched playoff spot; y – Clinched division

Western Conference Wild Card
Pos	Div	Team	GP	W	L	OTL	ROW	GF	GA	GD	Pts
1	CE	x – Minnesota Wild	82	43	27	12	35	207	206	+1	98
2	CE	x – Dallas Stars	82	40	31	11	36	235	228	+7	91
3	PA	Phoenix Coyotes	82	37	30	15	31	216	231	−15	89
4	CE	Nashville Predators	82	38	32	12	36	216	242	−26	88
5	CE	Winnipeg Jets	82	37	35	10	29	227	237	−10	84
6	PA	Vancouver Canucks	82	36	35	11	31	196	223	−27	83
7	PA	Calgary Flames	82	35	40	7	28	209	241	−32	77
8	PA	Edmonton Oilers	82	29	44	9	25	203	270	−67	67

Source: National Hockey League
x – Clinched playoff spot

== Schedule and results ==
=== Pre-season ===
2013 preseason game log: 4–2–1 (Home: 2–1–1; Road: 2–1–0)
#	Date	Visitor	Score	Home	OT	Decision	Attendance	Record	Recap
1	September 14	Calgary	6–5	Edmonton	SO	Berra	16,564	1–0–0	Recap
2	September 14	Edmonton	3–2	Calgary		Ortio	19,289	1–1–0	Recap
3^{[a]}	September 16	Calgary	2–4	Ottawa		Berra	6,500	1–2–0	Recap
4	September 17	NY Islanders	3–5	Calgary		MacDonald	19,289	2–2–0	Recap
5^{[b]}	September 17	Calgary	4–2	NY Islanders		Ramo	4,189	3–2–0	Recap
6	September 23	NY Rangers	1–4	Calgary		Ramo	19,289	4–2–0	Recap
7	September 25	Phoenix	3–2	Calgary	OT	Berra	19,289	4–2–1	Recap
Notes:^{a} Game was played at Credit Union Centre in Saskatoon, Saskatchewan.^{b} Game was played at Brandt Centre in Regina, Saskatchewan.

=== Regular season ===
2013–14 Game Log

October: 5–5–2 (Home: 3–1–1; Road: 2–4–1)
#	Date	Visitor	Score	Home	OT	Decision	Attendance	Record	Pts	Recap
1	October 3	Calgary	4–5	Washington	SO	Ramo	18,506	0–0–1	1	Recap
2	October 4	Calgary	4–3	Columbus		MacDonald	18,151	1–0–1	3	Recap
3	October 6	Vancouver	5–4	Calgary	OT	MacDonald	19,289	1–0–2	4	Recap
4	October 9	Montreal	2–3	Calgary		MacDonald	19,289	2–0–2	6	Recap
5	October 11	New Jersey	2–3	Calgary		MacDonald	19,289	3–0–2	8	Recap
6	October 16	Calgary	2–3	Anaheim		MacDonald	14,051	3–1–2	8	Recap
7	October 19	Calgary	3–6	San Jose		Ramo	17,562	3–2–2	8	Recap
8	October 21	Calgary	3–2	Los Angeles		Ramo	18,118	4–2–2	10	Recap
9	October 22	Calgary	2–4	Phoenix		MacDonald	10,141	4–3–2	10	Recap
10	October 24	Calgary	1–5	Dallas		Ramo	13,122	4–4–2	10	Recap
11	October 26	Washington	2–5	Calgary		Ramo	19,289	5–4–2	12	Recap
12	October 30	Toronto	4–2	Calgary		Ramo	19,289	5–5–2	12	Recap

November: 4–8–2 (Home: 1–4–2; Road: 3–4–0)
#	Date	Visitor	Score	Home	OT	Decision	Attendance	Record	Pts	Recap
13	November 1	Detroit	4–3	Calgary		MacDonald	19,289	5–6–2	12	Recap
14	November 3	Calgary	3–2	Chicago	OT	Berra	21,229	6–6–2	14	Recap
15	November 5	Calgary	1–5	Minnesota		Berra	17,708	6–7–2	14	Recap
16	November 7	Calgary	2–3	St. Louis		Berra	14,877	6–8–2	14	Recap
17	November 8	Calgary	2–4	Colorado		Ramo	17,620	6–9–2	14	Recap
18	November 12	San Jose	3–2	Calgary	OT	Berra	19,289	6–9–3	15	Recap
19	November 14	Dallas	7–3	Calgary		Berra	19,289	6–10–3	15	Recap
20	November 16	Edmonton	4–2	Calgary		Berra	19,289	6–11–3	15	Recap
21	November 18	Calgary	5–4	Winnipeg	SO	Berra	15,004	7–11–3	17	Recap
22	November 20	Columbus	2–1	Calgary	OT	Berra	19,289	7–11–4	18	Recap
23	November 22	Florida	3–4	Calgary	SO	Berra	19,289	8–11–4	20	Recap
24	November 27	Chicago	3–2	Calgary		Berra	19,289	8–12–4	20	Recap
25	November 29	Calgary	2–5	Anaheim		Berra	17,174	8–13–4	20	Recap
26	November 30	Calgary	2–1	Los Angeles		Ramo	18,118	9–13–4	22	Recap

December: 5–7–2 (Home: 3–5–0; Road: 2–2–2)
#	Date	Visitor	Score	Home	OT	Decision	Attendance	Record	Pts	Recap
27	December 4	Phoenix	1–4	Calgary		Ramo	19,289	10–13–4	24	Recap
28	December 6	Colorado	3–2	Calgary		Ramo	19,289	10–14–4	24	Recap
29	December 7	Calgary	2–1	Edmonton	OT	Berra	16,839	11–14–4	26	Recap
30	December 10	Boston	2–1	Calgary		Berra	19,289	11–15–4	26	Recap
31	December 12	Carolina	1–2	Calgary	OT	Ramo	19,289	12–15–4	28	Recap
32	December 14	Calgary	2–1	Buffalo	OT	Ramo	18,368	13–15–4	30	Recap
33	December 15	Calgary	3–4	NY Rangers	SO	Ramo	18,006	13–15–5	31	Recap
34	December 17	Calgary	0–2	Boston		Berra	17,565	13–16–5	31	Recap
35	December 19	Calgary	2–3	Detroit	OT	Ramo	20,066	13–16–6	32	Recap
36	December 21	Calgary	3–4	Pittsburgh		Ramo	18,663	13–17–6	32	Recap
37	December 23	St. Louis	3–4	Calgary	SO	Berra	19,289	14–17–6	34	Recap
38	December 27	Edmonton	2–0	Calgary		Berra	19,289	14–18–6	34	Recap
39	December 29	Vancouver	2–0	Calgary		Berra	19,289	14–19–6	34	Recap
40	December 31	Philadelphia	4–1	Calgary		Berra	19,289	14–20–6	34	Recap

January: 6–7–1 (Home: 4–4–0; Road: 2–3–1)
#	Date	Visitor	Score	Home	OT	Decision	Attendance	Record	Pts	Recap
41	January 3	Tampa Bay	2–0	Calgary		Ramo	19,289	14–21–6	34	Recap
42	January 6	Calgary	4–3	Colorado		Ramo	12,027	15–21–6	36	Recap
43	January 7	Calgary	0–6	Phoenix		Berra	10,229	15–22–6	36	Recap
44	January 9	St. Louis	5–0	Calgary		Ramo	19,289	15–23–6	36	Recap
45	January 11	Pittsburgh	2–1	Calgary		Berra	19,289	15–24–6	36	Recap
46	January 13	Calgary	2–0	Carolina		Ramo	15,276	16–24–6	38	Recap
47	January 14	Calgary	2–4	Nashville		Ramo	15,730	16–25–6	38	Recap
48	January 16	Winnipeg	5–2	Calgary		Berra	19,289	16–26–6	38	Recap
49	January 18	Calgary	2–3	Vancouver	SO	Ramo	18,910	16–26–7	39	Recap
50	January 20	Calgary	2–3	San Jose		Ramo	17,562	16–27–7	39	Recap
51	January 22	Phoenix	2–3	Calgary		Ramo	19,289	17–27–7	41	Recap
52	January 24	Nashville	4–5	Calgary	SO	Berra	19,289	18–27–7	43	Recap
53	January 28	Chicago	4–5	Calgary	OT	Ramo	19,289	19–27–7	45	Recap
54	January 30	San Jose	1–4	Calgary		Ramo	19,289	20–27–7	47	Recap

February: 2–3–0 (Home: 1–1–0; Road: 1–2–0)
#	Date	Visitor	Score	Home	OT	Decision	Attendance	Record	Pts	Recap
55	February 1	Minnesota	3–4	Calgary	OT	Berra	19,289	21–27–7	49	Recap
56	February 4	Calgary	0–2	Montreal		Berra	21,273	21–28–7	49	Recap
57	February 6	Calgary	4–2	NY Islanders		Berra	12,888	22–28–7	51	Recap
58	February 8	Calgary	1–2	Philadelphia		Berra	19,874	22–29–7	51	Recap
59	February 27	Los Angeles	2–0	Calgary		Ortio	19,289	22–30–7	51	Recap

March: 9–7–0 (Home: 6–3–0; Road: 3–4–0)
#	Date	Visitor	Score	Home	OT	Decision	Attendance	Record	Pts	Recap
60	March 1	Calgary	2–1	Edmonton	OT	Berra	16,839	23–30–7	53	Recap
61	March 3	Calgary	2–3	Minnesota		Berra	18,543	23–31–7	53	Recap
62	March 5	Ottawa	1–4	Calgary		Ortio	19,289	24–31–7	55	Recap
63	March 7	NY Islanders	3–4	Calgary		Ortio	19,289	25–31–7	57	Recap
64	March 8	Calgary	1–2	Vancouver		Ortio	18,910	25–32–7	57	Recap
65	March 10	Los Angeles	3–2	Calgary		Ortio	19,289	25–33–7	57	Recap
66	March 12	Anaheim	2–7	Calgary		Ortio	19,289	26–33–7	59	Recap
67	March 14	Calgary	4–3	Dallas	SO	MacDonald	18,532	27–33–7	61	Recap
68	March 15	Calgary	2–3	Phoenix		Ortio	16,373	27–34–7	61	Recap
69	March 18	Buffalo	1–3	Calgary		Ortio	19,289	28–34–7	63	Recap
70	March 21	Nashville	6–5	Calgary		MacDonald	19,289	28–35–7	63	Recap
71	March 22	Calgary	8–1	Edmonton		Ramo	16,389	29–35–7	65	Recap
72	March 24	San Jose	1–2	Calgary	SO	Ramo	19,829	30–35–7	67	Recap
73	March 26	Anaheim	3–2	Calgary		Ramo	19,289	30–36–7	67	Recap
74	March 28	NY Rangers	3–4	Calgary		Ramo	19,289	31–36–7	69	Recap
75	March 30	Calgary	3–6	Ottawa		Ramo	18,505	31–37–7	69	Recap

April: 4–3–0 (Home: 1–1–0; Road: 3–2–0)
#	Date	Visitor	Score	Home	OT	Decision	Attendance	Record	Pts	Recap
76	April 1	Calgary	2–3	Toronto		Ramo	19,482	31–38–7	69	Recap
77	April 3	Calgary	4–1	Tampa Bay		Ramo	17,495	32–38–7	71	Recap
78	April 4	Calgary	2–1	Florida		MacDonald	12,055	33–38–7	73	Recap
79	April 7	Calgary	1–0	New Jersey		Ramo	14,297	34–38–7	75	Recap
80	April 9	Los Angeles	3–4	Calgary	SO	Ramo	19,289	35–38–7	77	Recap
81	April 11	Winnipeg	5–3	Calgary		Ramo	19,289	35–39–7	77	Recap
82	April 13	Calgary	1–5	Vancouver		Ramo	18,910	35–40–7	77	Recap

Legend: Win (2 points) Loss (0 points) Overtime/shootout loss (1 point)

== Player statistics ==
Final stats

=== Skaters ===
Regular season
Player	GP	G	A	Pts	+/-	PIM
Jiri Hudler	75	17	37	54	4	16
Mark Giordano	64	14	33	47	12	63
Michael Cammalleri	63	26	19	45	−13	26
Mikael Backlund	76	18	21	39	4	32
Sean Monahan	75	22	12	34	−20	8
Matt Stajan	63	14	19	33	−13	42
T. J. Brodie	81	4	27	31	0	20
Kris Russell	68	7	22	29	−11	15
Joe Colborne	80	10	18	28	−17	34
Curtis Glencross	38	12	12	24	−11	12
Lee Stempniak^{‡}	52	8	15	23	−21	28
Paul Byron	47	7	14	21	6	27
Dennis Wideman	46	4	17	21	−15	18
David Jones	48	9	8	17	1	10
TJ Galiardi	62	4	13	17	−13	21
Chris Butler	82	2	14	16	−23	39
Lance Bouma	78	5	10	15	−4	41
Sven Baertschi	26	2	9	11	−4	6
Brian McGrattan	76	4	4	8	−4	100
Kevin Westgarth^{†}	36	4	3	7	−2	64
Ladislav Smid^{†}	56	1	5	6	−4	62
Tyler Wotherspoon	14	0	4	4	−3	4
Markus Granlund	7	2	1	3	2	0
Shane O'Brien	45	0	3	3	−8	58
Chad Billins	10	0	3	3	−3	0
Blair Jones	14	2	0	2	0	21
Kenny Agostino	8	1	1	2	−2	0
Ben Hanowski	11	0	2	2	−2	2
Max Reinhart	8	0	2	2	1	2
Chris Breen	9	0	2	2	1	5
Johnny Gaudreau	1	1	0	1	1	0
Corban Knight	7	1	0	1	−1	0
Tim Jackman^{‡}	10	1	0	1	−1	41
Derek Smith	14	0	1	1	−10	2
Ben Street	13	0	1	1	−2	4
Lane MacDermid^{†}	1	0	0	0	−1	7
Mark Cundari	4	0	0	0	−4	0
Bill Arnold	1	0	0	0	−1	0
Bryce Van Brabant	6	0	0	0	−1	2
Roman Horak^{‡}	1	0	0	0	0	0

=== Goaltenders ===
Regular season
Player	GP	TOI	W	L	OT	GA	GAA	SA	SV%	SO	G	A	PIM
Karri Ramo	40	2,193:46	17	15	4	97	2.65	1091	.911	2	0	1	10
Reto Berra^{‡}	29	1,648:23	9	17	2	81	2.95	788	.897	0	0	0	2
Joey MacDonald	11	598:45	5	4	1	29	2.90	264	.890	0	0	0	2
Joni Ortio	9	500:55	4	4	0	21	2.51	193	.891	0	0	2	0

^{†}Denotes player spent time with another organization before joining Flames. Stats reflect time with the Flames only.
^{‡}Traded mid-season. Stats reflect time with the Flames only.

== Awards and honours ==
=== Awards ===
League awards
Player	Award
Mikael Backlund	Third Star of the week (Jan. 27 – Feb. 2)

Team awards
Player	Award
Mikael Backlund	Ralph T. Scurfield Humanitarian Award
Matt Stajan	J. R. "Bud" McCaig Award

=== Milestones ===
Player	Milestone	Reached	Ref.
Sean Monahan	1st NHL game 1st NHL point (assist)	October 3, 2013	
Sean Monahan	1st NHL goal	October 4, 2013	
Jiri Hudler	100th NHL goal	October 16, 2013	
Chris Breen	1st NHL game	October 22, 2013	
Michael Cammalleri	250th NHL assist	November 1, 2013	
Reto Berra	1st NHL game 1st NHL win	November 3, 2013	
Chad Billins	1st NHL game 1st NHL point (assist)	November 5, 2013	
Shane O'Brien	500th NHL game	November 8, 2013	
Karri Ramo	1st NHL shutout	January 13, 2014	
Joni Ortio	1st NHL game	February 27, 2014	
Markus Granlund	1st NHL game	February 27, 2014	
Markus Granlund	1st NHL point (assist)	March 3, 2014	
Corban Knight	1st NHL game	March 5, 2014	
Markus Granlund	1st NHL goal	March 5, 2014	
Joni Ortio	1st NHL win	March 5, 2014	
Tyler Wotherspoon	1st NHL game	March 7, 2014	
Tyler Wotherspoon	1st NHL point (assist)	March 8, 2014	
Corban Knight	1st NHL goal (and point)	March 12, 2014	
Kenny Agostino	1st NHL game	March 21, 2014	
Mikael Backlund	100th NHL point	March 22, 2014	
Bryce Van Brabant	1st NHL game	April 1, 2014	
Kenny Agostino	1st NHL goal	April 4, 2014	
Michael Cammalleri	500th NHL point	April 4, 2014	
Bill Arnold	1st NHL game	April 13, 2014	
Johnny Gaudreau	1st NHL game 1st NHL goal	April 13, 2014	

== Transactions ==
=== Player re-signings ===
Player	Date	Contract terms (in US dollars)
Joey MacDonald	April 20, 2013	One-year, $925,000
Karri Ramo	July 5, 2013	Two-year, $5.5 million
Chris Butler	July 5, 2013	One-year, $1.7 million
Corban Knight	July 5, 2013	Two-year, $1.8 million (max $7.5 million with bonuses)
Brian McGrattan	July 5, 2013	Two-year, $1.5 million
Greg Nemisz	July 5, 2013	One-year, $750,000
Chris Breen	July 17, 2013	One-year, $577,500 (Two-way)
T. J. Brodie	July 31, 2013	Two-year, $2.125 million

=== Trades ===
June 27, 2013	To Calgary Flames David Jones; Shane O'Brien	To Colorado Avalanche Alex Tanguay; Cory Sarich
July 2, 2013	To Calgary Flames TJ Galiardi	To San Jose Sharks 4th-round pick in 2015
July 5, 2013	To Calgary Flames Kris Russell	To St. Louis Blues 5th-round pick in 2014
September 28, 2013	To Calgary Flames Joe Colborne	To Toronto Maple Leafs 4th-round pick in 2014
November 8, 2013	To Calgary Flames Ladislav Smid; Olivier Roy	To Edmonton Oilers Roman Horak; Laurent Brossoit
November 21, 2013	To Calgary Flames 6th-round pick in 2014	To Anaheim Ducks Tim Jackman
November 22, 2013	To Calgary Flames Lane MacDermid	To Dallas Stars 6th-round pick in 2014
December 30, 2013	To Calgary Flames Kevin Westgarth	To Carolina Hurricanes Greg Nemisz
March 5, 2014	To Calgary Flames 2nd-round pick in 2014	To Colorado Avalanche Reto Berra
March 5, 2014	To Calgary Flames 3rd-round pick in 2014	To Pittsburgh Penguins Lee Stempniak

=== Additions and subtractions ===
Additions
Player	Former team	Via
Chad Billins	Grand Rapids Griffins (AHL)	Free agency
Bryce Van Brabant	Quinnipiac University (ECAC)	Free agency

Subtractions
Player	New team	Via
Roman Cervenka	SKA Saint Petersburg (KHL)	Free agency
Danny Taylor	Farjestad BK (SEL)	Free agency
Leland Irving	Jokerit (SM-liiga)	Free agency
Miikka Kiprusoff	–	Retirement

== Draft picks ==
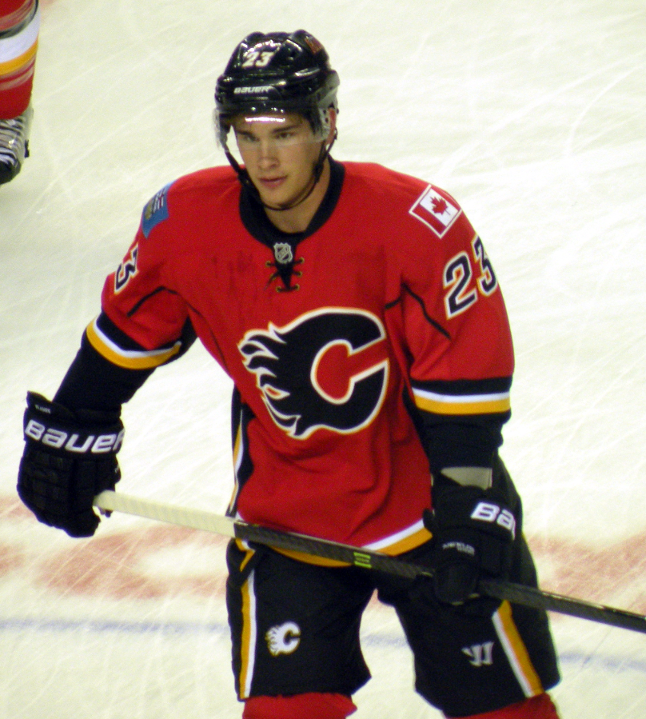
The first of three first round selections, Sean Monahan made the team out of training camp.

The Flames entered the 2013 NHL entry draft with three first round selections and eight overall. The Flames' own pick will be sixth overall, tying with the 1997 and 1998 drafts as the highest draft place the Flames have held since the franchise has been located in Calgary.

Rnd	Pick	Player	Nationality	Pos	Team (league)	NHL statistics				
Rnd	Pick	Player	Nationality	Pos	Team (league)	GP	G	A	Pts	PIM
1	6	Sean Monahan^{†}	Canada	C	Ottawa 67's (OHL)	156	53	43	86	20
1	22^{[a]}	Emile Poirier^{†}	Canada	LW	Gatineau Olympiques (QMJHL)	6	0	1	1	0
1	28^{[b]}	Morgan Klimchuk	Canada	LW	Regina Pats (WHL)					
3	67	Keegan Kanzig	Canada	D	Victoria Royals (WHL)					
5	135^{[c]}	Eric Roy	Canada	D	Brandon Wheat Kings (WHL)					
6	157	Tim Harrison	United States	RW	Dexter School (NEPSAC)					
7	187	Rushan Rafikov	Russia	D	Lokomotiv Yaroslavl Jr. (MHL)					
7	198^{[d]}	John Gilmour	United States	D	Providence College (Hockey East)					

Statistics are updated to the end of the 2014–15 NHL season. ^{†} denotes player was on an NHL roster in 2014–15.

Draft notes

- ^{a} The St. Louis Blues' first-round pick went to the Calgary Flames as a result of an April 1, 2013, trade that sent Jay Bouwmeester to the Blues in exchange for Mark Cundari, rights to Reto Berra and this pick.
- ^{b} The Pittsburgh Penguins' first-round pick went to the Calgary Flames as a result of a March 28, 2013, trade that sent Jarome Iginla to the Penguins in exchange for the rights to Kenny Agostino, Ben Hanowski and this pick.
- The Calgary Flames' second-round pick went to the Montreal Canadiens as the result of a January 12, 2012, trade that sent Michael Cammalleri, Karri Ramo and a 2012 fifth-round pick to the Flames in exchange for Rene Bourque, Patrick Holland and this pick.
- The Calgary Flames' fifth-round pick went to the Winnipeg Jets (via Washington), Calgary traded this pick to the Washington Capitals as the result of a June 27, 2012, trade that sent the rights to Dennis Wideman to the Flames in exchange for Jordan Henry and this pick.
- ^{c} The Columbus Blue Jackets' fifth-round pick went to the Calgary Flames as a result of an April 3, 2013, trade that sent Blake Comeau to the Blue Jackets in exchange for this pick.
- ^{d} The Ottawa Senators' seventh-round pick went to the Calgary Flames as a result of a January 21, 2013, trade that sent Henrik Karlsson to the Chicago Blackhawks in exchange for this pick.

== Abbotsford Heat ==
The Flames' top minor league affiliate, the Abbotsford Heat of the American Hockey League (AHL) finished the 2013–14 season with a 43–25–5–3 record. The Heat ranked fifth in the Western Conference and qualified for the Calder Cup playoffs where they lost their first round match-up to the Grand Rapids Griffins three games to one. Max Reinhart was the team's leading scorer and set an Abbotsford record with 63 points. Joni Ortio led the Heat in goal and was named to the AHL All-Rookie Team.

The season was the last in the British Columbia city for the franchise, as Abbotsford's city council announced that they had bought out the remaining years of the city's lease with the Flames for $5.5 million. With 3,007 fans per game, the Heat finished second-last in AHL attendance, and owing to a deal that guaranteed the Flames a minimum level of income, the team's attendance struggles cost the city $12 million total since the arrival of the AHL in 2009.
