= 2013–14 San Jose Sharks season =

National Hockey League team season

2013–14 San Jose Sharks
- Division: 2nd Pacific
- Conference: 4th Western
- 2013–14 record: 51–22–9
- Home record: 29–7–5
- Road record: 22–15–4
- Goals for: 249
- Goals against: 200

Team information
- General manager: Doug Wilson
- Coach: Todd McLellan
- Captain: Joe Thornton
- Alternate captains: Dan Boyle; Patrick Marleau
- Arena: SAP Center at San Jose
- Average attendance: 17,562
- Minor league affiliates: Worcester Sharks (AHL); San Francisco Bulls (ECHL)

Team leaders
- Goals: Joe Pavelski (41)
- Assists: Joe Thornton (65)
- Points: Joe Pavelski (79)
- Penalty minutes: Andrew Desjardins (86)
- Plus/minus: Marc-Edouard Vlasic (+31)
- Wins: Antti Niemi (39)
- Goals against average: Alex Stalock (1.87)

The 2013–14 San Jose Sharks season was the club's 23rd season in the National Hockey League (NHL). The Sharks qualified for the Stanley Cup playoffs for the tenth consecutive season, but lost in the first round to the eventual Stanley Cup champion Los Angeles Kings in seven games after being up 3–0 in the series.

== Standings ==
Pacific Division
Pos	Team	GP	W	L	OTL	ROW	GF	GA	GD	Pts
1	y – Anaheim Ducks	82	54	20	8	51	266	209	+57	116
2	x – San Jose Sharks	82	51	22	9	41	249	200	+49	111
3	x – Los Angeles Kings	82	46	28	8	38	206	174	+32	100
4	Phoenix Coyotes	82	37	30	15	31	216	231	−15	89
5	Vancouver Canucks	82	36	35	11	31	196	223	−27	83
6	Calgary Flames	82	35	40	7	28	209	241	−32	77
7	Edmonton Oilers	82	29	44	9	25	203	270	−67	67

Source: National Hockey League
x – Clinched playoff spot; y – Clinched division

== Schedule and results ==
=== Pre-season ===
2013 preseason game log: 4–1–1 (Home: 2–0–1; Road: 2–1–0)
#	Date	Visitor	Score	Home	OT	Decision	Attendance	Record	Recap
1	September 16	San Jose	3–2	Vancouver		Stalock	18,910	1–0–0	Recap
2	September 20	Anaheim	3–2	San Jose	OT	Niemi	15,760	1–0–1	Recap
3	September 21	Phoenix	2–3	San Jose	OT	Sateri	15,841	2–0–1	Recap
4	September 24	Vancouver	0–5	San Jose		Niemi	15,149	3–0–1	Recap
5	September 27	San Jose	1–2	Phoenix		Stalock	7,757	3–1–1	Recap
6	September 28	San Jose	6–5	Anaheim		Niemi	15,746	4–1–1	Recap

=== Regular season ===
2013–14 Game Log 51–22–9 (Home: 30–7–5; Road: 21–15–4)

October: 10–1–2 (Home: 5–0–0; Road: 5–1–2)
#	Date	Visitor	Score	Home	OT	Decision	Attendance	Record	Pts	Recap
1	October 3	Vancouver	1–4	San Jose		Niemi	17,562	1–0–0	2	Recap
2	October 5	Phoenix	1–4	San Jose		Niemi	17,562	2–0–0	4	Recap
3	October 8	NY Rangers	2–9	San Jose		Niemi	17,562	3–0–0	6	Recap
4	October 10	San Jose	4–1	Vancouver		Niemi	18,910	4–0–0	8	Recap
5	October 12	Ottawa	2–3	San Jose		Niemi	17,562	5–0–0	10	Recap
6	October 15	San Jose	6–2	St. Louis		Niemi	14,503	6–0–0	12	Recap
7	October 17	San Jose	3–4	Dallas	SO	Niemi	14,898	6–0–1	13	Recap
8	October 19	Calgary	3–6	San Jose		Niemi	17,562	7–0–1	15	Recap
9	October 21	San Jose	1–0	Detroit	SO	Niemi	20,066	8–0–1	17	Recap
10	October 24	San Jose	1–2	Boston		Niemi	17,565	8–1–1	17	Recap
11	October 26	San Jose	2–0	Montreal		Niemi	21,273	9–1–1	19	Recap
12	October 27	San Jose	5–2	Ottawa		Stalock	17,145	10–1–1	21	Recap
13	October 30	San Jose	3–4	Los Angeles	OT	Niemi	18,118	10–1–2	22	Recap

November: 8–2–3 (Home: 5–1–2; Road: 3–1–1)
#	Date	Visitor	Score	Home	OT	Decision	Attendance	Record	Pts	Recap
14	November 2	Phoenix	3–2	San Jose	SO	Niemi	17,562	10–1–3	23	Recap
15	November 5	Buffalo	5–4	San Jose	SO	Niemi	17,562	10–1–4	24	Recap
16	November 7	Vancouver	4–2	San Jose		Niemi	17,562	10–2–4	24	Recap
17	November 10	San Jose	4–5	Winnipeg	SO	Niemi	15,004	10–2–5	25	Recap
18	November 12	San Jose	3–2	Calgary	OT	Stalock	19,289	11–2–5	27	Recap
19	November 14	San Jose	2–1	Vancouver	OT	Niemi	18,910	12–2–5	29	Recap
20	November 15	San Jose	3–1	Edmonton		Stalock	16,839	13–2–5	31	Recap
21	November 17	San Jose	1–5	Chicago		Niemi	21,434	13–3–5	31	Recap
22	November 21	Tampa Bay	1–5	San Jose		Niemi	17,562	14–3–5	33	Recap
23	November 23	New Jersey	1–2	San Jose		Niemi	17,562	15–3–5	35	Recap
24	November 27	Los Angeles	2–3	San Jose	SO	Niemi	17,562	16–3–5	37	Recap
25	November 29	St. Louis	3–6	San Jose		Niemi	17,562	17–3–5	39	Recap
26	November 30	Anaheim	3–4	San Jose	SO	Niemi	17,562	18–3–5	41	Recap

December: 7–6–1 (Home: 4–0–1; Road: 3–6–0)
#	Date	Visitor	Score	Home	OT	Decision	Attendance	Record	Pts	Recap
27	December 3	San Jose	4–2	Toronto		Niemi	19,360	19–3–5	43	Recap
28	December 5	San Jose	1–5	Pittsburgh		Niemi	18,522	19–4–5	43	Recap
29	December 6	San Jose	3–5	Carolina		Stalock	14,553	19–5–5	43	Recap
30	December 8	San Jose	1–3	Minnesota		Niemi	18,411	19–6–5	43	Recap
31	December 10	NY Islanders	3–2	San Jose	SO	Niemi	17,562	19–6–6	44	Recap
32	December 12	Minnesota	1–3	San Jose		Niemi	17,562	20–6–6	46	Recap
33	December 14	San Jose	2–3	Nashville		Niemi	16,243	20–7–6	46	Recap
34	December 17	San Jose	4–2	St. Louis		Niemi	16,323	21–7–6	48	Recap
35	December 19	San Jose	1–4	Los Angeles		Niemi	18,118	21–8–6	48	Recap
36	December 21	Dallas	2–3	San Jose	SO	Stalock	17,562	22–8–6	50	Recap
37	December 23	Colorado	4–5	San Jose	SO	Niemi	17,562	23–8–6	52	Recap
38	December 27	San Jose	4–3	Phoenix	SO	Niemi	17,125	24–8–6	54	Recap
39	December 29	Anaheim	1–3	San Jose		Niemi	17,562	25–8–6	56	Recap
40	December 31	San Jose	3–6	Anaheim		Niemi	17,424	25–9–6	56	Recap

January: 9–6–0 (Home: 5–2–0; Road: 4–4–0)
#	Date	Visitor	Score	Home	OT	Decision	Attendance	Record	Pts	Recap
41	January 2	Edmonton	1–5	San Jose		Niemi	17,562	26–9–6	58	Recap
42	January 4	San Jose	3–4	Colorado		Stalock	17,154	26–10–6	58	Recap
43	January 5	San Jose	3–2	Chicago	SO	Stalock	21,599	27–10–6	60	Recap
44	January 7	San Jose	2–3	Nashville		Niemi	15,016	27–11–6	60	Recap
45	January 9	Detroit	1–4	San Jose		Niemi	17,562	28–11–6	62	Recap
46	January 11	Boston	1–0	San Jose		Niemi	17,562	28–12–6	62	Recap
47	January 14	San Jose	2–1	Washington	SO	Niemi	18,506	29–12–6	64	Recap
48	January 16	San Jose	3–0	Florida		Stalock	13,149	30–12–6	66	Recap
49	January 18	San Jose	5–4	Tampa Bay		Niemi	19,204	31–12–6	68	Recap
50	January 20	Calgary	2–3	San Jose		Niemi	17,562	32–12–6	70	Recap
51	January 23	Winnipeg	0–1	San Jose		Stalock	17,562	33–12–6	72	Recap
52	January 25	Minnesota	2–3	San Jose	OT	Niemi	17,562	34–12–6	74	Recap
53	January 27	Los Angeles	1–0	San Jose		Stalock	17,562	34–13–6	74	Recap
54	January 29	San Jose	0–3	Edmonton		Niemi	16,839	34–14–6	74	Recap
55	January 30	San Jose	1–4	Calgary		Stalock	19,289	34–15–6	74	Recap

February: 4–2–0 (Home: 3–1–0; Road: 1–1–0)
#	Date	Visitor	Score	Home	OT	Decision	Attendance	Record	Pts	Recap
56	February 1	Chicago	1–2	San Jose	SO	Niemi	17,562	35–15–6	76	Recap
57	February 3	Philadelphia	5–2	San Jose		Niemi	17,562	35–16–6	76	Recap
58	February 5	Dallas	1–2	San Jose	OT	Stalock	17,562	36–16–6	78	Recap
59	February 7	Columbus	2–3	San Jose		Niemi	17,562	37–16–6	80	Recap
60	February 27	San Jose	7–3	Philadelphia		Stalock	19,879	38–16–6	82	Recap
61	February 28	San Jose	2–4	Buffalo		Niemi	19,070	38–17–6	82	Recap

March: 9–3–3 (Home: 4–2–2; Road: 5–1–1)
#	Date	Visitor	Score	Home	OT	Decision	Attendance	Record	Pts	Recap
62	March 2	San Jose	4–2	New Jersey		Stalock	16,012	39–17–6	84	Recap
63	March 4	Carolina	3–2	San Jose	OT	Stalock	17,562	39–17–7	85	Recap
64	March 6	Pittsburgh	3–5	San Jose		Niemi	17,562	40–17–7	87	Recap
65	March 8	Montreal	0–4	San Jose		Niemi	17,562	41–17–7	89	Recap
66	March 11	Toronto	2–6	San Jose		Niemi	17,562	42–17–7	91	Recap
67	March 13	San Jose	4–3	Columbus	SO	Stalock	13,851	43–17–7	93	Recap
68	March 14	San Jose	4–3	NY Islanders		Niemi	13,128	44–17–7	95	Recap
69	March 16	San Jose	1–0	NY Rangers		Niemi	18,006	45–17–7	97	Recap
70	March 18	Florida	3–2	San Jose		Niemi	17,562	45–18–7	97	Recap
71	March 20	Anaheim	2–3	San Jose		Niemi	17,562	46–18–7	99	Recap
72	March 22	Washington	3–2	San Jose	SO	Niemi	17,562	46–18–8	100	Recap
73	March 24	San Jose	1–2	Calgary	SO	Stalock	19,829	46–18–9	101	Recap
74	March 25	San Jose	5–2	Edmonton		Niemi	16,839	47–18–9	103	Recap
75	March 27	Winnipeg	4–3	San Jose		Niemi	17,562	47–19–9	103	Recap
76	March 29	San Jose	2–3	Colorado		Stalock	18,077	47–20–9	103	Recap

April: 4–2–0 (Home: 3–1–0; Road: 1–1–0)
#	Date	Visitor	Score	Home	OT	Decision	Attendance	Record	Pts	Recap
77	April 1	Edmonton	4–5	San Jose		Niemi	17,562	48–20–9	105	Recap
78	April 3	Los Angeles	1–2	San Jose		Niemi	17,562	49–20–9	107	Recap
79	April 5	Nashville	3–0	San Jose		Niemi	17,562	49–21–9	107	Recap
80	April 9	San Jose	2–5	Anaheim		Niemi	17,322	49–22–9	107	Recap
81	April 11	Colorado	1–5	San Jose		Stalock	17,562	50–22–9	109	Recap
82	April 12	San Jose	3–2	Phoenix		Niemi	15,438	51–22–9	111	Recap

Legend: Win (2 points) Loss (0 points) Overtime/shootout loss (1 point)

== Playoffs ==
The Sharks entered the playoffs as the Pacific Division's second seed. They faced the Los Angeles Kings in the first round. With a 5–1 Game 7 loss, the Sharks became the fourth team in NHL history to lose a series when initially holding a 3–0 series lead.

2014 Stanley Cup Playoffs

Western Conference First Round vs. (P3) Los Angeles Kings: Los Angeles won series 4–3
#	Date	Visitor	Score	Home	OT	Decision	Attendance	Series	Recap
1	April 17	Los Angeles	3–6	San Jose		Niemi	17,562	1–0	Recap
2	April 20	Los Angeles	2–7	San Jose		Niemi	17,562	2–0	Recap
3	April 22	San Jose	4–3	Los Angeles	OT	Niemi	18,390	3–0	Recap
4	April 24	San Jose	3–6	Los Angeles		Niemi	18,376	3–1	Recap
5	April 26	Los Angeles	3–0	San Jose		Niemi	17,562	3–2	Recap
6	April 28	San Jose	1–4	Los Angeles		Stalock	18,384	3–3	Recap
7	April 30	Los Angeles	5–1	San Jose		Niemi	17,562	3–4	Recap

Legend: Win Loss

== Player statistics ==
Final stats.

Skaters

Regular season
Player	GP	G	A	Pts	+/−	PIM
Joe Pavelski	82	41	38	79	+23	32
Joe Thornton	82	11	65	76	+20	32
Patrick Marleau	82	33	37	70	0	18
Logan Couture	65	23	31	54	+21	20
Brent Burns	69	22	26	48	+26	34
Tommy Wingels	77	16	22	38	+11	35
Dan Boyle	75	12	24	36	−8	32
Jason Demers	75	5	29	34	+14	30
Tomas Hertl	37	15	10	25	+11	4
Matthew Nieto	66	10	14	24	−4	16
Marc-Edouard Vlasic	81	5	19	24	+31	38
Martin Havlat	48	12	10	22	+14	10
James Sheppard	67	4	16	20	+3	35
Matt Irwin	62	2	17	19	+5	35
Justin Braun	82	4	13	17	+19	20
Tyler Kennedy	67	4	13	17	−10	34
Andrew Desjardins	81	3	14	17	−8	86
Scott Hannan	56	3	9	12	+1	55
Brad Stuart	61	3	8	11	+4	35
Bracken Kearns	25	3	2	5	−2	6
Raffi Torres	5	3	2	5	+4	7
Mike Brown^{†}	48	2	3	5	−10	75
John McCarthy	36	1	1	2	−11	4
Matt Pelech	6	1	0	1	+1	22
Eriah Hayes	15	1	0	1	−2	2
Adam Burish	15	0	0	0	−4	6
Freddie Hamilton	11	0	0	0	−5	2

Playoffs
Player	GP	G	A	Pts	+/−	PIM
Patrick Marleau	7	3	4	7	0	2
Joe Pavelski	7	2	4	6	−3	2
James Sheppard	7	2	4	6	+3	6
Matthew Nieto	7	2	3	5	+3	0
Tomas Hertl	7	2	3	5	−3	2
Dan Boyle	7	0	4	4	−1	8
Joe Thornton	7	2	1	3	−6	8
Raffi Torres	7	2	1	3	+3	18
Brent Burns	7	2	1	3	−5	23
Marc-Edouard Vlasic	5	1	2	3	0	0
Logan Couture	7	1	2	3	0	7
Tommy Wingels	7	0	3	3	−2	4
Mike Brown	6	1	1	2	+1	26
Justin Braun	7	1	1	2	+1	7
Scott Hannan	7	0	2	2	+1	0
Andrew Desjardins	7	0	2	2	0	31
Matt Irwin	2	1	0	1	−1	0
Jason Demers	7	0	1	1	−4	12
Brad Stuart	7	0	0	0	+1	0
Martin Havlat	1	0	0	0	−1	0

Goaltenders

Regular season
Player	GP	GS	TOI	W	L	OT	GA	GAA	SA	SV%	SO	G	A	PIM
Antti Niemi	64	64	3740:17	39	17	7	149	2.39	1705	.913	4	0	2	0
Alex Stalock	24	18	1251:43	12	5	2	39	1.87	571	.932	2	0	0	2

Playoffs
Player	GP	GS	TOI	W	L	GA	GAA	SA	SV%	SO	G	A	PIM
Antti Niemi	6	6	304:44	3	3	19	3.74	164	.884	0	0	0	0
Alex Stalock	3	1	117:02	0	1	4	2.05	56	.929	0	0	0	0

^{†}Denotes player spent time with another team before joining the Sharks. Stats reflect time with the Sharks only.
^{‡}Traded mid-season
Bold/italics denotes franchise record

== Transactions ==
The Sharks have been involved in the following transactions during the 2013–14 season:

=== Trades ===
Date	Details
June 30, 2013	To Pittsburgh Penguins 2nd-round pick in 2013	To San Jose Sharks Tyler Kennedy
June 30, 2013	To Detroit Red Wings 1st-round pick (20th overall) in 2013; PIT's 2nd-round pick in 2013	To San Jose Sharks 1st-round pick (18th overall) in 2013
June 30, 2013	To Chicago Blackhawks 4th-round pick (111th overall) in 2013; 5th-round pick in 2014	To San Jose Sharks ANA's 4th-round pick (117th overall) in 2013; 5th-round pick in 2013
June 30, 2013	To Calgary Flames TJ Galiardi (Note: Trade of negotiating rights to.)	To San Jose Sharks 4th-round pick in 2015
July 6, 2013	To Edmonton Oilers Lee Moffie	To San Jose Sharks Kyle Bigos
October 21, 2013	To Edmonton Oilers 4th-round pick in 2014	To San Jose Sharks Mike Brown
February 5, 2014	To Minnesota Wild Curt Gogol	To San Jose Sharks Chad Rau
March 5, 2014	To Los Angeles Kings James Livingston	To San Jose Sharks Conditional 7th-round pick in 2016 (Note: Condition not satisfied.)
June 5, 2014	To New York Islanders Dan Boyle (Note: Trade of negotiating rights to.)	To San Jose Sharks Conditional 5th-round pick in 2015 (Note: Condition satisfied.)

=== Free agents signed ===
Player	Former team	Contract terms
Rob Davison	Red Bull Salzburg	1 year, $550,000
Adam Comrie	Worcester Sharks	1 year, $550,000
Barclay Goodrow	North Bay Battalion	3 years, $1.88 million entry-level contract
Ryan Carpenter	Bowling Green State University	2 years, $1.85 million entry-level contract
Melker Karlsson	Skelleftea AIK	1 year, $925,000 entry-level contract

=== Free agents lost ===
Player	New team	Contract terms
Thomas Greiss	Phoenix Coyotes	1 year, $750,000
Dominic Moore	New York Rangers	1 year, $1 million
Tim Kennedy	Phoenix Coyotes	1 year, $700,000
Scott Gomez	Florida Panthers	1 year, $900,000

=== Players' signings ===
Player	Date	Contract terms
Troy Grosenick	July 2, 2013	2 years, $1.25 million
Harri Sateri	July 2, 2013	1 year, $600,000
Logan Couture	July 5, 2013	5 years, $30 million contract extension
Tyler Kennedy	July 5, 2013	2 years, $4.7 million
Scott Hannan	July 5, 2013	1 year, $1 million
Alex Stalock	July 10, 2013	1 year, $625,000
Matt Pelech	July 10, 2013	1 year, $550,000
Joe Pavelski	July 30, 2013	5 years, $30 million contract extension
Marek Viedensky	August 2, 2013	1 year, $550,000
Bracken Kearns	August 2, 2013	1 year, $550,000
Nick Petrecki	September 11, 2013	1 year, $715,000
Mirco Mueller	September 22, 2013	3 years, $2.775 million entry-level contract
Patrick Marleau	January 24, 2014	3 years, $19.98 million contract extension
Joe Thornton	January 24, 2014	3 years, $20.25 million contract extension
Alex Stalock	June 17, 2014	2 years, $3.2 million contract extension
Mike Brown	June 17, 2014	2 years, $2.4 million contract extension

== Draft picks ==
San Jose Sharks' picks at the 2013 NHL entry draft, which was held in Newark, New Jersey on June 30, 2013.

Round	#	Player	Pos	Nationality	College/Junior/Club team (League)
1	18^{[a]}	Mirco Mueller	Defence	Switzerland	Everett Silvertips (WHL)
2	49^{[b]}	Gabryel Paquin-Boudreau	Left wing	Canada	Baie-Comeau Drakkar (QMJHL)
4	117^{[c]}	Fredrik Bergvik	Goaltender	Sweden	Frolunda HC Jr. (J20 SuperElit)
5	141	Michael Brodzinski	Defence	United States	Muskegon Lumberjacks (USHL)
5	151^{[c]}	Gage Ausmus	Defence	United States	U.S. National Team Development Program (USHL)
7	201	Jake Jackson	Centre	United States	Tartan High School (Minn.)
7	207^{[d]}	Emil Galimov	Left wing	Russia	Lokomotiv Yaroslavl (KHL)

Draft notes

- ^{a} The Detroit Red Wings' first-round pick went to the San Jose Sharks as a result of a June 30, 2013, trade that sent the Sharks 2013 first-round pick and a 2013 second-round pick (originally acquired from the Pittsburgh Penguins in exchange for Douglas Murray) to the Red Wings.
- ^{b} The New York Rangers' second-round pick went to the San Jose Sharks as a result of an April 2, 2013, trade that sent Ryane Clowe to the Rangers in exchange for a 2013 third-round pick and this pick.
- The San Jose Sharks' second-round pick went to the Pittsburgh Penguins as a result of a June 30, 2013, trade that sent Tyler Kennedy to the Sharks in exchange for this pick.
- The San Jose Sharks' third-round pick went to the Minnesota Wild as the result of an August 7, 2011, trade that sent James Sheppard to the Sharks in exchange for this pick.
- ^{c} The Chicago Blackhawks' fourth-round pick (originally from the Anaheim Ducks) and a fifth-round pick went to the San Jose Sharks in exchange for the San Jose Sharks' fourth-round pick (previously re-acquired from Chicago in exchange for Michal Handzus) and a 2014 fifth-round pick.
- The San Jose Sharks' sixth-round pick went to the Nashville Predators as the result of an April 3, 2013, trade that sent Scott Hannan to the Sharks in exchange for this pick.
- ^{d} The Colorado Avalanche seventh-round pick (originally from the Anaheim Ducks) went to the San Jose Sharks as a result of a February 27, 2012, trade that sent Jamie McGinn, Mike Connolly and Michael Sgarbossa to the Avalanche in exchange for Daniel Winnik, TJ Galiardi and this pick.
