= 2013–14 Colorado Avalanche season =

National Hockey League team season

2013–14 Colorado Avalanche
- Central Division champions
- Division: 1st Central
- Conference: 2nd Western
- 2013–14 record: 52–22–8
- Home record: 26–11–4
- Road record: 26–11–4
- Goals for: 250
- Goals against: 220

Team information
- General manager: Greg Sherman
- Coach: Patrick Roy
- Captain: Gabriel Landeskog
- Alternate captains: Paul Stastny; Cody McLeod
- Arena: Pepsi Center
- Average attendance: 16,295 (92.1%); Total: 668,133
- Minor league affiliates: Lake Erie Monsters (AHL); Denver Cutthroats (CHL)

Team leaders
- Goals: Ryan O'Reilly (28)
- Assists: Matt Duchene (47)
- Points: Matt Duchene (70)
- Penalty minutes: Cody McLeod (122)
- Plus/minus: Gabriel Landeskog (+21)
- Wins: Semyon Varlamov (41)
- Goals against average: Semyon Varlamov (2.41)

The 2013–14 Colorado Avalanche season was the 35th season for the National Hockey League (NHL) franchise that was established on June 22, 1979, and 19th season since the franchise relocated to Colorado to start the 1995–96 NHL season. Before the season, the Avalanche moved from the Northwest Division to the Central Division. The Avalanche managed to qualify for the playoffs for the first time since the 2009–10 season. They also claimed the top spot in the division for the first time since 2003.

== Off-season ==
On May 23, 2013, the Avalanche named former goaltender Patrick Roy as their new head coach and vice president of hockey operations. This was the first season without Milan Hejduk since the 1997-98 season as he retired on November 13.

== Regular season ==
On October 30, 2013, goaltender Semyon Varlamov turned himself into Denver police on charges of kidnapping and assault. The charges were later dismissed.

Four players were chosen to represent their country at the 2014 Winter Olympics: Matt Duchene (Canada), Gabriel Landeskog (Sweden), Paul Stastny (United States) and Semyon Varlamov (Russia).

== Standings ==
Central Division
Pos	Team	GP	W	L	OTL	ROW	GF	GA	GD	Pts
1	y – Colorado Avalanche	82	52	22	8	47	250	220	+30	112
2	x – St. Louis Blues	82	52	23	7	43	248	191	+57	111
3	x – Chicago Blackhawks	82	46	21	15	40	267	220	+47	107
4	Minnesota Wild	82	43	27	12	35	207	206	+1	98
5	Dallas Stars	82	40	31	11	36	235	228	+7	91
6	Nashville Predators	82	38	32	12	36	216	242	−26	88
7	Winnipeg Jets	82	37	35	10	29	227	237	−10	84

Source: National Hockey League
x – Clinched playoff spot; y – Clinched division

== Schedule and results ==
=== Pre-season ===
2013 preseason game log: 3–3–0 (Home: 1–2–0; Road: 2–1–0)
#	Date	Visitor	Score	Home	OT	Decision	Attendance	Record	Recap
1	September 18	Anaheim	2–1	Colorado		Varlamov		0–1–0	Recap
2	September 20	Los Angeles	3–4	Colorado	OT	Pickard		1–1–0	Recap
3	September 22	Colorado	2–1	Anaheim		Varlamov	12,743	2–1–0	Recap
4	September 24	Dallas	5–3	Colorado		Giguere	10,000	2–2–0	Recap
5	September 26	Colorado	1–5	Dallas		Varlamov	6,590	2–3–0	Recap
6^{[a]}	September 28	Colorado	3–2	Los Angeles		Giguere	11,722	3–3–0	Recap
Notes:^{a} Game was played at MGM Grand Garden Arena in Paradise, Nevada.

=== Regular season ===
2013–14 Game Log

October: 10–1–0 (Home: 5–1–0; Road: 5–0–0)
#	Date	Visitor	Score	Home	OT	Decision	Attendance	Record	Pts	Recap
1	October 2	Anaheim	1–6	Colorado		Varlamov	18,007	1–0–0	2	Recap
2	October 4	Nashville	1–3	Colorado		Varlamov	14,494	2–0–0	4	Recap
3	October 8	Colorado	2–1	Toronto		Varlamov	19,388	3–0–0	6	Recap
4	October 10	Colorado	2–0	Boston		Giguere	17,565	4–0–0	8	Recap
5	October 12	Colorado	5–1	Washington		Varlamov	18,506	5–0–0	10	Recap
6	October 15	Dallas	2–3	Colorado		Varlamov	15,208	6–0–0	12	Recap
7	October 17	Detroit	4–2	Colorado		Varlamov	18,101	6–1–0	12	Recap
8	October 19	Colorado	4–2	Buffalo		Giguere	18,422	7–1–0	14	Recap
9	October 21	Colorado	1–0	Pittsburgh		Giguere	18,606	8–1–0	16	Recap
10	October 25	Carolina	2–4	Colorado		Varlamov	16,177	9–1–0	18	Recap
11	October 27	Winnipeg	2–3	Colorado		Varlamov	13,927	10–1–0	20	Recap

November: 9–5–0 (Home: 5–3–0; Road: 4–2–0)
#	Date	Visitor	Score	Home	OT	Decision	Attendance	Record	Pts	Recap
12	November 1	Colorado	3–2	Dallas	OT	Varlamov	15,223	11–1–0	22	Recap
13	November 2	Montreal	1–4	Colorado		Giguere	18,152	12–1–0	24	Recap
14	November 6	Nashville	6–4	Colorado		Varlamov	14,043	12–2–0	24	Recap
15	November 8	Calgary	2–4	Colorado		Giguere	17,620	13–2–0	26	Recap
16	November 10	Washington	1–4	Colorado		Varlamov	17,625	14–2–0	28	Recap
17	November 12	Colorado	1–2	Carolina		Varlamov	13,278	14–3–0	28	Recap
18	November 14	Colorado	3–7	St. Louis		Varlamov	14,190	14–4–0	28	Recap
19	November 16	Florida	4–1	Colorado		Varlamov	17,321	14–5–0	28	Recap
20	November 19	Chicago	1–5	Colorado		Varlamov	17,348	15–5–0	30	Recap
21	November 21	Colorado	4–3	Phoenix	OT	Varlamov	12,285	16–5–0	32	Recap
22	November 23	Colorado	1–0	Los Angeles	OT	Varlamov	18,118	17–5–0	34	Recap
23	November 27	St. Louis	4–1	Colorado		Varlamov	17,595	17–6–0	34	Recap
24	November 29	Colorado	3–1	Minnesota		Giguere	19,081	18–6–0	36	Recap
25	November 30	Minnesota	2–3	Colorado	SO	Varlamov	17,857	19–6–0	38	Recap

December: 5–5–4 (Home: 3–1–2; Road: 2–4–2)
#	Date	Visitor	Score	Home	OT	Decision	Attendance	Record	Pts	Recap
26	December 5	Colorado	2–8	Edmonton		Varlamov	16,839	19–7–0	38	Recap
27	December 6	Colorado	3–2	Calgary		Giguere	19,289	20–7–0	40	Recap
28	December 8	Colorado	1–3	Vancouver		Giguere	18,910	20–8–0	40	Recap
29	December 10	Phoenix	3–1	Colorado		Varlamov	14,110	20–9–0	40	Recap
30	December 12	Colorado	4–3	Winnipeg	SO	Varlamov	15,004	21–9–0	42	Recap
31	December 14	Minnesota	2–1	Colorado	SO	Varlamov	16,188	21–9–1	43	Recap
32	December 16	Dallas	2–6	Colorado		Varlamov	13,915	22–9–1	45	Recap
33	December 17	Colorado	2–3	Dallas		Giguere	15,143	22–10–1	45	Recap
34	December 19	Edmonton	2–4	Colorado		Varlamov	13,135	23–10–1	47	Recap
35	December 21	Colorado	2–3	Los Angeles	SO	Varlamov	18,118	23–10–2	48	Recap
36	December 23	Colorado	4–5	San Jose	SO	Varlamov	17,562	23–10–3	49	Recap
37	December 27	Colorado	2–7	Chicago		Giguere	22,201	23–11–3	49	Recap
38	December 29	Winnipeg	2–1	Colorado	OT	Varlamov	17,733	23–11–4	50	Recap
39	December 31	Columbus	3–5	Colorado		Varlamov	16,177	24–11–4	52	Recap

January: 10–3–1 (Home: 5–2–1; Road: 5–1–0)
#	Date	Visitor	Score	Home	OT	Decision	Attendance	Record	Pts	Recap
40	January 2	Philadelphia	1–2	Colorado		Varlamov	16,793	25–11–4	54	Recap
41	January 4	San Jose	3–4	Colorado		Varlamov	17,154	26–11–4	56	Recap
42	January 6	Calgary	4–3	Colorado		Giguere	12,027	26–12–4	56	Recap
43	January 8	Ottawa	3–4	Colorado	OT	Varlamov	12,487	27–12–4	58	Recap
44	January 10	NY Islanders	2–1	Colorado	OT	Varlamov	17,430	27–12–5	59	Recap
45	January 11	Colorado	4–2	Minnesota		Varlamov	19,117	28–12–5	61	Recap
46	January 14	Colorado	3–2	Chicago	OT	Varlamov	21,412	29–12–5	63	Recap
47	January 16	New Jersey	1–2	Colorado	SO	Varlamov	14,090	30–12–5	65	Recap
48	January 18	Colorado	5–4	Nashville		Varlamov	17,113	31–12–5	67	Recap
49	January 21	Toronto	5–2	Colorado		Varlamov	14,877	31–13–5	67	Recap
50	January 24	Colorado	3–2	Florida		Varlamov	17,274	32–13–5	69	Recap
51	January 25	Colorado	2–5	Tampa Bay		Aittokallio	19,204	32–14–5	69	Recap
52	January 27	Colorado	4–3	Dallas		Varlamov	11,678	33–14–5	71	Recap
53	January 30	Minnesota	4–5	Colorado		Varlamov	14,697	34–14–5	73	Recap

February: 4–3–0 (Home: 2–1–0; Road: 2–2–0)
#	Date	Visitor	Score	Home	OT	Decision	Attendance	Record	Pts	Recap
54	February 1	Buffalo	1–7	Colorado		Varlamov	16,649	35–14–5	75	Recap
55	February 3	Colorado	2–1	New Jersey	OT	Giguere	14,213	36–14–5	77	Recap
56	February 4	Colorado	1–5	NY Rangers		Varlamov	18,006	36–15–5	77	Recap
57	February 6	Colorado	1–3	Philadelphia		Varlamov	19,982	36–16–5	77	Recap
58	February 8	Colorado	5–2	NY Islanders		Giguere	15,360	37–16–5	79	Recap
59	February 26	Los Angeles	6–4	Colorado		Giguere	16,754	37–17–5	79	Recap
60	February 28	Phoenix	2–4	Colorado		Varlamov	17,649	38–17–5	81	Recap

March: 9–3–1 (Home: 5–2–0; Road: 4–1–1)
#	Date	Visitor	Score	Home	OT	Decision	Attendance	Record	Pts	Recap
61	March 2	Tampa Bay	3–6	Colorado		Varlamov	15,592	39–17–5	83	Recap
62	March 4	Colorado	4–2	Chicago		Varlamov	21,361	40–17–5	85	Recap
63	March 6	Colorado	3–2	Detroit	OT	Giguere	20,066	41–17–5	87	Recap
64	March 8	St. Louis	2–1	Colorado		Varlamov	18,137	41–18–5	87	Recap
65	March 10	Winnipeg	2–3	Colorado	OT	Varlamov	15,250	42–18–5	89	Recap
66	March 12	Chicago	2–3	Colorado		Varlamov	18,007	43–18–5	91	Recap
67	March 14	Anaheim	6–4	Colorado		Varlamov	18,030	43–19–5	91	Recap
68	March 16	Colorado	3–1	Ottawa		Varlamov	19,501	44–19–5	93	Recap
69	March 18	Colorado	3–6	Montreal		Giguere	21,273	44–20–5	93	Recap
70	March 19	Colorado	4–5	Winnipeg	OT	Berra	15,004	44–20–6	94	Recap
71	March 21	Boston	2–0	Colorado		Varlamov	18,007	44–21–6	94	Recap
72	March 25	Colorado	5–4	Nashville	SO	Varlamov	16,438	45–21–6	96	Recap
73	March 27	Vancouver	2–3	Colorado	OT	Varlamov	16,965	46–21–6	98	Recap
74	March 29	San Jose	2–3	Colorado		Varlamov	18,077	47–21–6	100	Recap

April: 5–1–2 (Home: 1–0–1; Road: 4–1–1)
#	Date	Visitor	Score	Home	OT	Decision	Attendance	Record	Pts	Recap
75	April 1	Colorado	3–2	Columbus	OT	Varlamov	16,550	48–21–6	102	Recap
76	April 3	NY Rangers	2–3	Colorado	SO	Varlamov	16,721	49–21–6	104	Recap
77	April 5	Colorado	4–0	St. Louis		Varlamov	19,153	50–21–6	106	Recap
78	April 6	Pittsburgh	3–2	Colorado	SO	Varlamov	18,007	50–21–7	107	Recap
79	April 8	Colorado	4–1	Edmonton		Giguere	16,839	51–21–7	109	Recap
80	April 10	Colorado	4–2	Vancouver		Varlamov	18,910	52–21–7	111	Recap
81	April 11	Colorado	1–5	San Jose		Berra	17,562	52–22–7	111	Recap
82	April 13	Colorado	2–3	Anaheim	OT	Giguere	17,528	52–22–8	112	Recap

Legend: Win (2 points) Loss (0 points) Overtime/shootout loss (1 point)

== Playoffs ==
2014 Stanley Cup Playoffs

Western Conference First Round vs. (WC) Minnesota Wild: Wild Win Series 4–3
#	Date	Visitor	Score	Home	OT	Decision	Attendance	Series	Recap
1	April 17	Minnesota	4–5	Colorado	OT	Varlamov	18,074	1–0	Recap
2	April 19	Minnesota	2–4	Colorado		Varlamov	18,402	2–0	Recap
3	April 21	Colorado	0–1	Minnesota	OT	Varlamov	19,221	2–1	Recap
4	April 24	Colorado	1–2	Minnesota		Varlamov	19,396	2–2	Recap
5	April 26	Minnesota	3–4	Colorado	OT	Varlamov	18,418	3–2	Recap
6	April 28	Colorado	2–5	Minnesota		Varlamov	19,314	3–3	Recap
7	April 30	Minnesota	5–4	Colorado	OT	Varlamov	18,511	3–4	Recap

Legend: Win Loss

== Player statistics ==
Final stats

Skaters

Regular season
Player	GP	G	A	Pts	+/−	PIM
Matt Duchene	71	23	47	70	8	19
Gabriel Landeskog	81	26	39	65	21	71
Ryan O'Reilly	80	28	36	64	−1	2
Nathan MacKinnon	82	24	39	63	20	26
Paul Stastny	71	25	35	60	9	22
Erik Johnson	80	9	30	39	5	61
Jamie McGinn	79	19	19	38	−3	30
Tyson Barrie	64	13	25	38	17	20
P. A. Parenteau	55	14	19	33	3	30
John Mitchell	75	11	21	32	13	36
Andre Benoit	79	7	21	28	2	26
Nick Holden	54	10	15	25	12	22
Maxime Talbot^{†}	70	7	18	25	4	43
Jan Hejda	78	6	11	17	8	40
Cody McLeod	71	5	8	13	2	122
Patrick Bordeleau	82	6	5	11	−1	115
Alex Tanguay	16	4	7	11	7	4
Cory Sarich	54	1	9	10	7	38
Nate Guenin	68	1	8	9	3	46
Marc-Andre Cliche	76	1	6	7	−11	17
Steve Downie^{‡}	11	1	6	7	4	36
Ryan Wilson	28	0	6	6	1	12
Brad Malone	32	3	2	5	−4	23
Stefan Elliott	1	1	0	1	0	0
David Van Der Gulik	2	0	0	0	0	0
Matt Hunwick	1	0	0	0	0	0
Paul Carey	12	0	0	0	0	2
Karl Stollery	2	0	0	0	1	2

Playoffs
Player	GP	G	A	Pts	+/−	PIM
Paul Stastny	7	5	5	10	−1	4
Nathan MacKinnon	7	2	8	10	2	4
Ryan O'Reilly	7	2	4	6	3	0
Jamie McGinn	7	2	3	5	−1	2
Gabriel Landeskog	7	3	1	4	−2	8
Nick Holden	7	3	1	4	2	8
P. A. Parenteau	7	1	2	3	0	2
Matt Duchene	2	0	3	3	−1	2
Erik Johnson	7	1	1	2	−6	2
Tyson Barrie	3	0	2	2	3	0
Ryan Wilson	4	0	2	2	−1	2
Cody McLeod	7	1	0	1	−1	22
Andre Benoit	7	0	1	1	3	6
Nate Guenin	7	0	1	1	1	4
Joey Hishon	3	0	1	1	0	2
Maxime Talbot	7	0	0	0	−3	4
Jan Hejda	7	0	0	0	−6	6
Patrick Bordeleau	7	0	0	0	−1	10
Marc-Andre Cliche	7	0	0	0	−3	2
Brad Malone	6	0	0	0	−1	2
Paul Carey	3	0	0	0	−1	0

Goaltenders

Regular season
Player	GP	GS	TOI	W	L	OT	GA	GAA	SA	SV%	SO	G	A	PIM
Semyon Varlamov	63	60	3640	41	14	6	146	2.41	2013	.927	2	0	3	2
Jean-Sebastien Giguere	22	19	1212	11	6	1	53	2.62	608	.913	2	0	0	4
Reto Berra^{†}	2	2	72	0	1	1	7	5.83	32	.781	0	0	0	0
Sami Aittokallio	1	1	40	0	1	0	3	4.50	18	.833	0	0	0	0

Goaltenders

Playoffs
Player	GP	GS	TOI	W	L	GA	GAA	SA	SV%	SO	G	A	PIM
Semyon Varlamov	7	7	432	3	4	20	2.78	231	.913	0	0	0	0

^{†}Denotes player spent time with another team before joining the Avalanche. Stats reflect time with the Avalanche only.
^{‡}Traded mid-season
Bold/italics denotes franchise record

== Awards and honours ==
=== Awards ===
Regular season
Player	Award	Date
Nathan MacKinnon	Calder Memorial Trophy	June 24, 2014
Patrick Roy	Jack Adams Award	June 24, 2014
Ryan O'Reilly	Lady Byng Memorial Trophy	June 24, 2014
Semyon Varlamov	2013-14 NHL Second All-Star Team	June 24, 2014

== Transactions ==
The following transactions took place during the 2013–14 NHL season.

=== Trades ===
Date	Details
June 27, 2013	To Calgary Flames David Jones; Shane O'Brien	To Colorado Avalanche Alex Tanguay; Cory Sarich
October 31, 2013	To Philadelphia Flyers Steve Downie	To Colorado Avalanche Maxime Talbot
March 5, 2014	To Calgary Flames 2nd-round pick in 2014	To Colorado Avalanche Reto Berra

=== Free agents acquired ===
Player	Former team	Contract terms
Andre Benoit	Ottawa Senators	1 year, $900,000
Nate Guenin	Norfolk Admirals	1 year, $600,000
Guillaume Desbiens	Chicago Wolves	1 year, $600,000
J. T. Wyman	Tampa Bay Lightning	1 year, $750,000
Nick Holden	Columbus Blue Jackets	2 years, $1.2 million
Cody Corbett	Edmonton Oil Kings	3 years, $1.850 million entry-level contract
Samuel Henley	Val-d'Or Foreurs	3 years, $1.76 million entry-level contract
Dennis Everberg	Rögle BK	2 years, $1.225 million entry-level contract
Roman Will	BK Mladá Boleslav	2 years, $1.145 million entry-level contract
Borna Rendulic	HPK	2 years, $1.24 million entry-level contract

=== Free agents lost ===
Player	New team	Contract terms
Aaron Palushaj	Carolina Hurricanes	1 year, $600,000

=== Claimed via waivers ===
Player	Former team	Date claimed off waivers
Marc-Andre Cliche	Los Angeles Kings	September 22, 2013

=== Lost via waivers ===
Player	New team	Date claimed off waivers

=== Lost via retirement ===
Player
Milan Hejduk

=== Player signings ===
Player	Date	Contract terms
David Van der Gulik	July 5, 2013	1 year, $600,000
Colin Smith	July 5, 2013	3 years, $1.885 million entry-level contract
Nathan MacKinnon	July 9, 2013	3 years, $2.775 million entry-level contract
Brad Malone	July 17, 2013	1 year, $735,000
Matt Duchene	July 18, 2013	5 years, $30 million contract extension
Gabriel Landeskog	August 15, 2013	7 years, $39 million contract extension
Chris Bigras	September 17, 2013	3 years, $2.715 million entry-level contract
Nate Guenin	January 7, 2014	2 years, $1.6 million contract extension
Semyon Varlamov	January 30, 2014	5 years, $29.5 million contract extension
Marc-Andre Cliche	February 27, 2014	2 years, $1.4 million contract extension
Reto Berra	March 14, 2014	3 years, $4.35 million contract extension
John Mitchell	March 14, 2014	3 years, $5.4 million contract extension
Troy Bourke	May 29, 2014	3 years, $1.895 million entry-level contract
Jamie McGinn	June 19, 2014	2 years, $5.9 million contract extension

== Draft picks ==
Colorado Avalanche's picks at the 2013 NHL entry draft, to be held in Newark, New Jersey, on June 30, 2013.

Round	#	Player	Pos	Nationality	College/junior/club team (league)
1	1	Nathan MacKinnon	C	Canada	Halifax Mooseheads (QMJHL)
2	32	Chris Bigras	D	Canada	Owen Sound Attack (OHL)
3	63	Spencer Martin	G	Canada	Mississauga Steelheads (OHL)
4	93	Mason Geertsen	D	Canada	Vancouver Giants (WHL)
5	123	Will Butcher	D	United States	U.S. National Team Development Program (USHL)
6	153	Ben Storm	D	United States	Muskegon Lumberjacks (USHL)
7	183	Wilhelm Westlund	D	Sweden	Färjestad BK (SHL)
