= List of San Jose Sharks seasons =

The San Jose Sharks are a professional ice hockey team based in San Jose, California. The team is a member of the Pacific Division of the Western Conference of the National Hockey League (NHL).

== Table key ==
Key of colors and symbols
Color/symbol	Explanation
†	Stanley Cup champions
‡	Conference champions
↑	Division champions
#	Led league in points

Key of terms and abbreviations
Term or abbreviation	Definition
Finish	Final position in division or league standings
GP	Number of games played
W	Number of wins
L	Number of losses
T	Number of ties
OT	Number of losses in overtime (since the 1999–2000 season)
Pts	Number of points
GF	Goals for (goals scored by the Sharks)
GA	Goals against (goals scored by the Sharks' opponents)
—	Does not apply

== Year by year ==
Season	Sharks season	Conference	Division	Regular season									Postseason					
Season	Sharks season	Conference	Division	Finish	GP	W	L	T	OT	Pts	GF	GA	GP	W	L	GF	GA	Result
1991–92	1991–92	Campbell	Smythe	6th	80	17	58	5	—	39	219	359	—	—	—	—	—	Did not qualify
1992–93	1992–93	Campbell	Smythe	6th	84	11	71	2	—	24	218	414	—	—	—	—	—	Did not qualify
1993–94	1993–94	Western	Pacific	3rd	84	33	35	16	—	82	252	265	14	7	7	42	53	Won in conference quarterfinals, 4–3 (Red Wings); Lost in conference semifinals, 3–4 (Maple Leafs)
1994–95^{1}	1994–95	Western	Pacific	3rd	48	19	25	4	—	42	129	161	11	4	7	32	59	Won in conference quarterfinals, 4–3 (Flames); Lost in conference semifinals, 0–4 (Red Wings)
1995–96	1995–96	Western	Pacific	7th	82	20	55	7	—	47	252	357	—	—	—	—	—	Did not qualify
1996–97	1996–97	Western	Pacific	7th	82	27	47	8	—	62	211	278	—	—	—	—	—	Did not qualify
1997–98	1997–98	Western	Pacific	4th	82	34	38	10	—	78	210	216	6	2	4	12	16	Lost in conference quarterfinals, 2–4 (Stars)
1998–99	1998–99	Western	Pacific	4th	82	31	33	18	—	80	196	191	6	2	4	17	19	Lost in conference quarterfinals, 2–4 (Avalanche)
1999–2000	1999–2000	Western	Pacific	4th	82	35	30	10	7	87	225	214	12	5	7	27	37	Won in conference quarterfinals, 4–3 (Blues); Lost in conference semifinals, 1–4 (Stars)
2000–01	2000–01	Western	Pacific	2nd	82	40	27	12	3	95	217	192	6	2	4	11	16	Lost in conference quarterfinals, 2–4 (Blues)
2001–02	2001–02	Western	Pacific↑	1st	82	44	27	8	3	99	248	199	12	7	5	34	32	Won in conference quarterfinals, 4–1 (Coyotes); Lost in conference semifinals, 3–4 (Avalanche)
2002–03	2002–03	Western	Pacific	5th	82	28	37	9	8	73	214	239	—	—	—	—	—	Did not qualify
2003–04	2003–04	Western	Pacific↑	1st	82	43	21	12	6	104	219	183	17	10	7	38	32	Won in conference quarterfinals, 4–1 (Blues); Won in conference semifinals, 4–2 (Avalanche); Lost in conference finals, 2–4 (Flames)
2004–05	2004–05	Season cancelled due to 2004–05 NHL lockout																
2005–06	2005–06	Western	Pacific	2nd	82	44	27	—	11	99	265	235	11	6	5	29	29	Won in conference quarterfinals, 4–1 (Predators); Lost in conference semifinals, 2–4 (Oilers)
2006–07	2006–07	Western	Pacific	2nd	82	51	26	—	5	107	256	197	11	6	5	25	27	Won in conference quarterfinals, 4–1 (Predators); Lost in conference semifinals, 2–4 (Red Wings)
2007–08	2007–08	Western	Pacific↑	1st	82	49	23	—	10	108	216	187	13	6	7	30	32	Won in conference quarterfinals, 4–3 (Flames); Lost in conference semifinals, 2–4 (Stars)
2008–09	2008–09	Western	Pacific↑	1st	82	53	18	—	11	117	251	199	6	2	4	10	18	Lost in conference quarterfinals, 2–4 (Ducks)
2009–10	2009–10	Western	Pacific↑	1st	82	51	20	—	11	113	264	215	15	8	7	41	41	Won in conference quarterfinals, 4–2 (Avalanche); Won in conference semifinals, 4–1 (Red Wings); Lost in conference finals, 0–4 (Blackhawks)
2010–11	2010–11	Western	Pacific↑	1st	82	48	25	—	9	105	248	213	18	9	9	51	58	Won in conference quarterfinals, 4–2 (Kings); Won in conference semifinals, 4–3 (Red Wings); Lost in conference finals, 1–4 (Canucks)
2011–12	2011–12	Western	Pacific	2nd	82	43	29	—	10	96	228	210	5	1	4	8	14	Lost in conference quarterfinals, 1–4 (Blues)
2012–13^{3}	2012–13	Western	Pacific	3rd	48	25	16	—	7	57	124	116	11	7	4	25	22	Won in conference quarterfinals, 4–0 (Canucks); Lost in conference semifinals, 3–4 (Kings)
2013–14	2013–14	Western	Pacific	2nd	82	51	22	—	9	111	249	200	7	3	4	22	26	Lost in first round, 3–4 (Kings)
2014–15	2014–15	Western	Pacific	5th	82	40	33	—	9	89	228	232	—	—	—	—	—	Did not qualify
2015–16	2015–16	Western‡	Pacific	3rd	82	46	30	—	6	98	241	210	24	14	10	75	56	Won in first round, 4–1 (Kings); Won in second round, 4–3 (Predators); Won in conference finals, 4–2 (Blues); Lost in Stanley Cup Final, 2–4 (Penguins)
2016–17	2016–17	Western	Pacific	3rd	82	46	29	—	7	99	221	201	6	2	4	14	12	Lost in first round, 2–4 (Oilers)
2017–18	2017–18	Western	Pacific	3rd	82	45	27	—	10	100	252	229	10	6	4	30	26	Won in first round, 4–0 (Ducks); Lost in second round, 2–4 (Golden Knights)
2018–19	2018–19	Western	Pacific	2nd	82	46	27	—	9	101	289	261	20	10	10	58	66	Won in first round, 4–3 (Golden Knights); Won in second round, 4–3 (Avalanche); Lost in conference finals, 2–4 (Blues)
2019–20^{4}	2019–20	Western	Pacific	8th	70	29	36	—	5	63	182	226	—	—	—	—	—	Did not qualify
2020–21^{5}	2020–21	—	West	7th	56	21	28	—	7	49	151	199	—	—	—	—	—	Did not qualify
2021–22	2021–22	Western	Pacific	6th	82	32	37	—	13	77	214	264	—	—	—	—	—	Did not qualify
2022–23	2022–23	Western	Pacific	7th	82	22	44	—	16	60	234	321	—	—	—	—	—	Did not qualify
2023–24	2023–24	Western	Pacific	8th	82	19	54	—	9	47	181	331	—	—	—	—	—	Did not qualify
2024–25	2024–25	Western	Pacific	8th	82	20	50	—	12	52	210	315	—	—	—	—	—	Did not qualify
2025–26	2025–26	Western	Pacific	5th	82	39	35	—	9	86	251	292	—	—	—	—	—	Did not qualify
Totals					2,684	1,202	1,140	121	222	2,746	7,580	8,141	241	119	122	631	691	21 playoff appearances

^{1} Season was shortened due to the 1994–95 NHL lockout.
^{2} As of the 2005–06 NHL season, all games will have a winner; the OTL column includes SOL (Shootout losses).
^{3} Season was shortened due to the 2012–13 NHL lockout.
^{4} The season was suspended on March 12, 2020 because of the COVID-19 pandemic.
^{5} Season was shortened due to the COVID-19 pandemic.

== All-time records ==
Statistic	GP	W	L	T	OT
Regular season record (1991–present)	2,602	1,163	1,105	121	213
Postseason record (1991–present)	241	119	122	—	—
All-time regular and postseason record	2,843	1,282	1,227	121	213
All-time series record: 20–21
