= Bryce Van Brabant =

Canadian ice hockey player (born 1991)

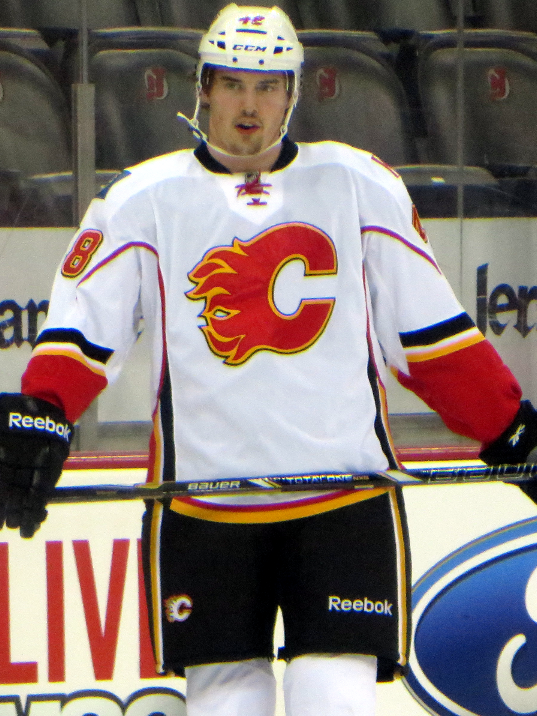
- Born: November 12, 1991 (age 34) Morinville, Alberta, Canada
- Height: 6 ft 3 in (191 cm)
- Weight: 205 lb (93 kg; 14 st 9 lb)
- Position: Left wing
- Shot: Left
- Played for: Calgary Flames
- NHL draft: Undrafted
- Playing career: 2014–2017

Bryce Van Brabant (born November 12, 1991) is a Canadian former professional ice hockey player. He played in the National Hockey League (NHL) with the Calgary Flames. Van Brabant played three seasons of college hockey for the Quinnipiac Bobcats, helping the team reach its first appearance in the national championship game.

== Playing career ==
A native of Morinville, Alberta, Bryce is the eldest of five children to Dwight and Louise Van Brabant and learned to play hockey on a backyard rink in his hometown. He was an average sized winger until experiencing a growth spurt at age 15 that allowed him to develop into a physical, defensive-minded power forward. Van Brabant played three seasons of Junior A hockey for the Spruce Grove Saints in the Alberta Junior Hockey League (AJHL) between 2008 and 2011 where he recorded 47 points and 384 penalty minutes.

Van Brabant turned to college hockey after his junior career and spent three seasons with the Quinnipiac Bobcats program. He played a limited role with the team as a freshman in 2011–12, but was praised by his coach in his sophomore year for having a break-out season, helping Quinnipiac rise to become the fifth-ranked team in the National Collegiate Athletic Association (NCAA). Quinnipiac reached the 2013 Frozen Four where Van Brabant's defensive play attracted interest from numerous National Hockey League (NHL) teams. The Bobcats reached the national championship game for the first time in the school's history but lost to Yale by a 4–0 score.

The Calgary Flames, Edmonton Oilers, and New York Islanders each invited Van Brabant to participate in their summer development camps. He spent time with both Alberta teams before returning to Quinnipiac in 2013–14. Having scored nine goals in total during his first two seasons with the Bobcats, Van Brabant finished third in team scoring during his junior year with 15 goals, and first in penalty minutes with 113. His improved offence resulted in increased interest from NHL teams. As many as 20 clubs routinely sent scouts to monitor his play. Several teams hoped to sign Van Brabant upon the conclusion of his 2013–14 college season, and at least two of them promised an immediate jump to the NHL: the Flames and the Chicago Blackhawks.

Soon after Quinnipiac lost the 2014 East Regional playoff, Van Brabant opted to forgo his senior season and signed a two-year contract with the Calgary Flames on March 29, 2014 for a projected $1.35 million per season. He made his debut on April 1 against the Toronto Maple Leafs, becoming the first Quinnipiac alumnus to appear in the NHL.

Throughout his entry-level contract with the Flames, Van Brabant was assigned to AHL affiliates, the Adirondack Flames and Stockton Heat. Unable to crack the Flames roster, Van Brabant was not tendered a qualifying offer after his contract. As a free agent over the summer, Van Brabant signed a one-year deal with the Idaho Steelheads of the ECHL on September 14, 2016.

== Career statistics ==
			Regular season					Playoffs
Season	Team	League	GP	G	A	Pts	PIM	GP	G	A	Pts	PIM
2008–09	Spruce Grove Saints	AJHL	46	4	7	11	84	4	2	2	4	6
2009–10	Spruce Grove Saints	AJHL	51	8	6	14	137	16	1	4	5	16
2010–11	Spruce Grove Saints	AJHL	54	10	12	22	163	13	2	3	5	41
2011–12	Quinnipiac Bobcats	ECAC	33	4	3	7	51	—	—	—	—	—
2012–13	Quinnipiac Bobcats	ECAC	42	5	8	13	48	—	—	—	—	—
2013–14	Quinnipiac Bobcats	ECAC	40	15	7	22	113	—	—	—	—	—
2013–14	Calgary Flames	NHL	6	0	0	0	2	—	—	—	—	—
2014–15	Adirondack Flames	AHL	52	8	7	15	54	—	—	—	—	—
2015–16	Stockton Heat	AHL	62	7	9	16	51	—	—	—	—	—
2016–17	Texas Stars	AHL	21	1	1	2	41	—	—	—	—	—
2016–17	Idaho Steelheads	ECHL	15	4	5	9	10	5	0	0	0	4
2017–18	Stony Plain Eagles	ACH	6	3	5	8	6	—	—	—	—	—
NHL totals			6	0	0	0	2	—	—	—	—	—
