= Thomas Greiss =

German ice hockey player (born 1986)

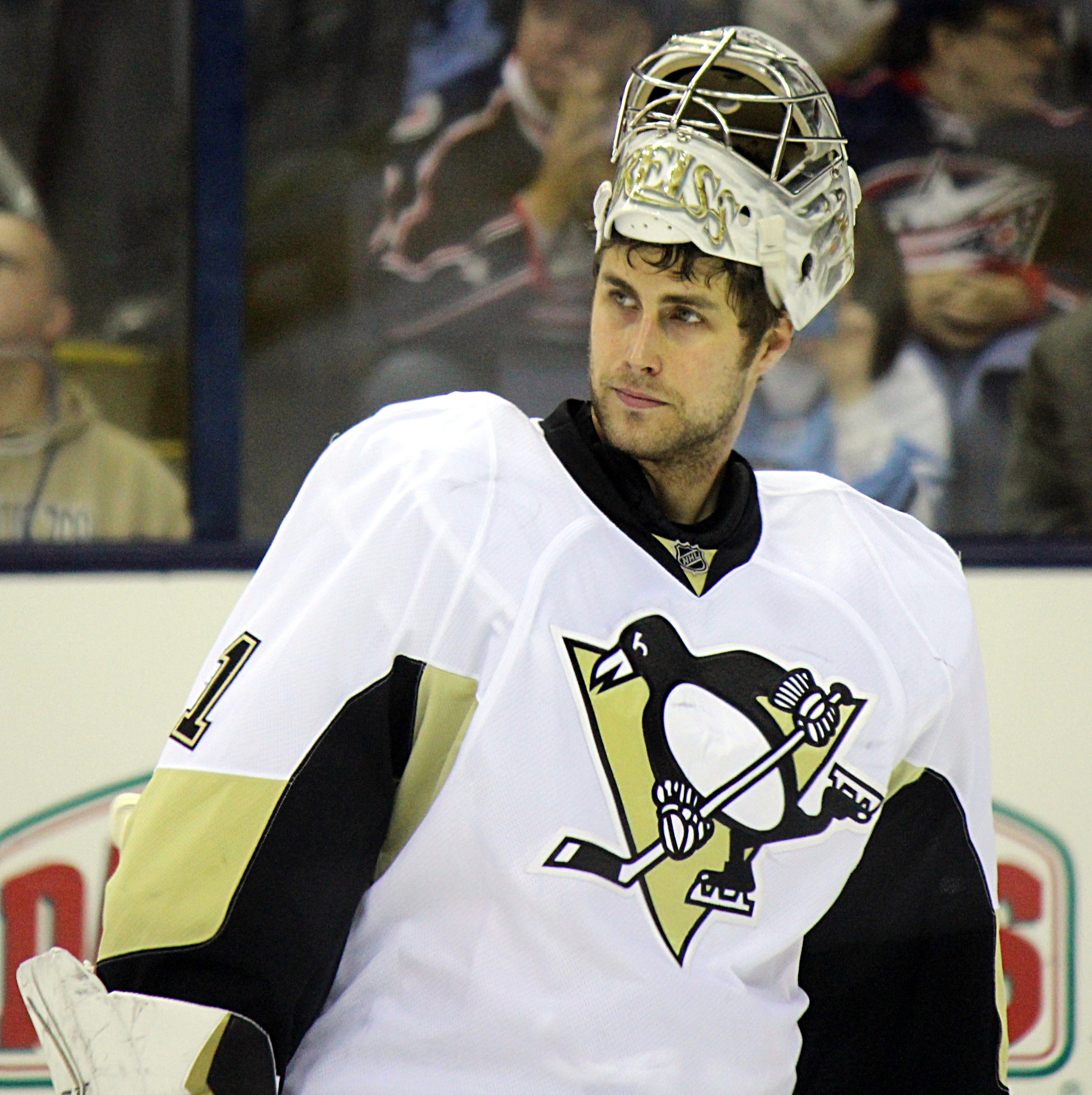
- Greiss with the Pittsburgh Penguins in 2014
- Born: 29 January 1986 (age 40) Füssen, West Germany
- Height: 6 ft 1 in (185 cm)
- Weight: 220 lb (100 kg; 15 st 10 lb)
- Position: Goaltender
- Catches: Left
- DEL team Former teams: Löwen Frankfurt; Kölner Haie; San Jose Sharks; Brynäs IF; Hannover Scorpions; Phoenix Coyotes; Pittsburgh Penguins; New York Islanders; Detroit Red Wings; St. Louis Blues
- National team: Germany
- NHL draft: 94th overall, 2004; San Jose Sharks
- Playing career: 2004–present

Thomas Greiss (born 29 January 1986) is a German professional ice hockey goaltender who currently plays for Löwen Frankfurt of the Deutsche Eishockey Liga. Selected 94th overall in the third round of the 2004 NHL entry draft by the San Jose Sharks, he played in the National Hockey League (NHL) for the Sharks, Phoenix Coyotes, Pittsburgh Penguins, New York Islanders, Detroit Red Wings and St. Louis Blues.

== Playing career ==
Greiss is a native of Füssen, Germany. As a youth, he played in the 1999 Quebec International Pee-Wee Hockey Tournament with a team from Munich. He developed through the youth ranks of EV Füssen before heading to the Kölner Haie organization in 2002. He made his debut in the German top-flight Deutsche Eishockey Liga (DEL) for the Cologne-based team during the 2003–04 campaign.

The San Jose Sharks selected Greiss in the third round, 94th overall, in the 2004 NHL entry draft. Greiss played for San Jose during the Sharks' preseason games ahead of the 2007–08 season, though he was eventually assigned to the team's then-American Hockey League (AHL) affiliate, the Worcester Sharks. On 8 January 2008, he was recalled to replace German compatriot Dimitri Pätzold as the backup goaltender to Evgeni Nabokov. Greiss started his first career NHL game on 13 January 2008, an eventual 4–3 overtime loss to the Anaheim Ducks. For the 2009–10 season, he served as the back-up goaltender to starter Nabokov.

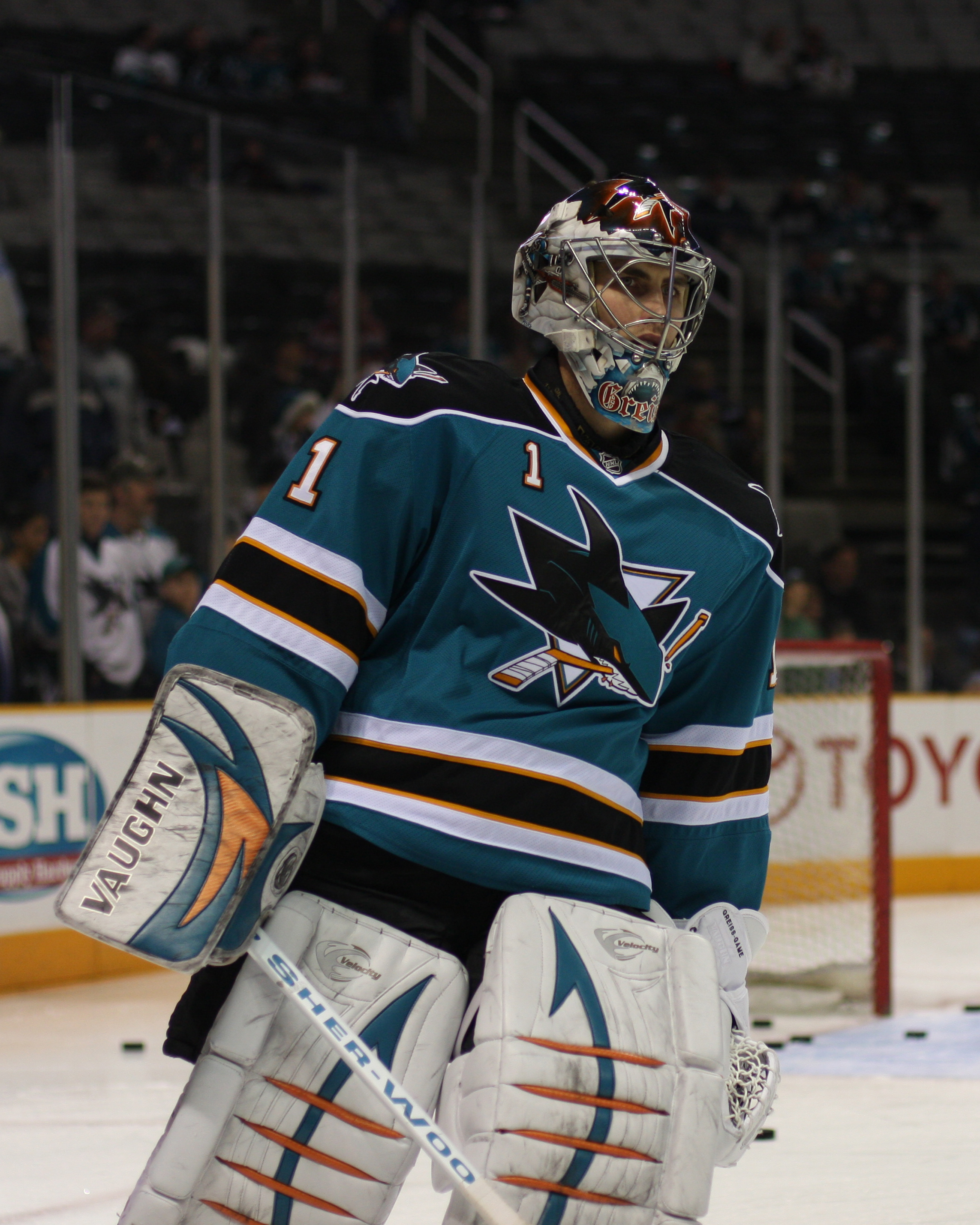
Greiss with the San Jose Sharks in 2009

On 12 October 2010, just prior to the commencement of the 2010–11 season, Greiss was put on waivers by San Jose, eventually clearing and reporting to Worcester of the AHL. Greiss' demotion was in large part due to the off-season signings of Finnish goaltenders Antero Niittymäki and Antti Niemi. Nine days later, after failing to see any gameplay as Worcester's third-string goaltender, he was reassigned to Brynäs IF in the Swedish Elitserien to provide him regular playing time. In April 2011, Greiss was recalled from Brynäs to San Jose for the team's run in the 2011 Stanley Cup playoffs. He later re-signed with the Sharks on 7 July.

For the Sharks' 2011–12 season opener, Greiss was the team's starter in a 6–3 win over the Phoenix Coyotes in San Jose. He went on to start the next two games—losses to the Anaheim Ducks and St. Louis Blues—before Antti Niemi returned from off-season surgery. Later in the season, Greiss recorded his first career NHL shutout on 26 January 2013, recording 24 saves in a 4–0 win over the Colorado Avalanche.

Greiss became a free agent in July 2013 and subsequently signed a one-year contract with the Phoenix Coyotes. In his only season with Phoenix, he played in 25 games, posting a 2.25 goals against average (GAA) and .920 save percentage. At the end of the 2013–14 season, he was not re-signed by the Coyotes, whereupon he signed a one-year, $1 million contract as an unrestricted free agent with the Pittsburgh Penguins on 1 July 2014. After the 2014–15 season in which he appeared in 20 games for the Penguins, Greiss once again switched teams as a free agent, signing with the New York Islanders on a two-year, $3 million contract on 1 July 2015. In March 2016, Jaroslav Halák, the Islanders' starting goaltender, suffered a lower-body injury sidelining him six weeks, leaving Greiss as the team's temporary starter.

In December 2016, the Islanders waived Halák, leaving Greiss and Jean-François Bérubé as the Islanders' two goaltenders. On 30 January 2017, Greiss signed a three-year contract extension with the Islanders. On 15 January 2018, Greiss made a career-high 52 saves in a 5–4 overtime win over the Montreal Canadiens.

On 10 October 2020, Greiss signed a two-year, $7.2 million contract with the Detroit Red Wings. Greiss was named the NHL First Star of the Week for the week ending 3 May 2021. He stopped all 66 shots he faced across 130:00 of regulation and overtime. It marked the third time that Greiss had posted consecutive shutouts during his NHL career, and the first time a Detroit goaltender has accomplished the feat since Petr Mrázek did so in January 2018.

On 13 July 2022, Greiss signed as a free agent to a one-year, $1.25 million contract with the St. Louis Blues. Featuring in his 14th NHL season in 2022–23, Greiss served as the Blues backup goaltender to Jordan Binnington, and posted seven wins through 21 appearances, as the Blues missed the postseason.

On 12 July 2023, as a free agent from the Blues and despite contract offers, Greiss announced his retirement from the NHL and his professional ice hockey career.

On 25 September 2024, Greiss announced his return to ice hockey by signing a short-term contract with Löwen Frankfurt, following the injuries of Juho Olkinuora and Cody Brenner.

== International play ==
In 2006, Greiss earned a roster spot on the German team for the 2006 Winter Olympics; at just 20 years of age, he was the youngest goaltender in the tournament. During the tournament, Greiss notably recorded an impressive 35-save performance against Canada.

Greiss was again named to the German squad for in the 2010 Winter Olympics in Vancouver.

Greiss represented Germany at the 2017 IIHF World Championship. While at the event, he drew controversy for liking posts critical of Hillary Clinton on Twitter, including one comparing Clinton to Adolf Hitler.

In 2021, the German Ice Hockey Federation (DEB) announced that Greiss would no longer be representing Germany at international events, following Greiss' Instagram posts about the death of controversial conservative radio personality Rush Limbaugh.

== Personal life ==
Greiss' wife Brittney (née Palmer) was Miss South Dakota USA in 2014. Together, they have a daughter.

== Career statistics ==
=== Regular season and playoffs ===
			Regular season									Playoffs
Season	Team	League	GP	W	L	T/OT	MIN	GA	SO	GAA	SV%	GP	W	L	MIN	GA	SO	GAA	SV%
2003–04	Kölner Haie	DEL	1	0	0	0	20	4	0	12.00	.600	—	—	—	—	—	—	—	—
2004–05	Kölner Haie	DEL	8	—	—	—	459	16	0	2.09	.936	—	—	—	—	—	—	—	—
2004–05	Eisbären Regensburg	2.GBun	1	—	—	—	60	2	0	2.00	—	—	—	—	—	—	—	—	—
2005–06	Kölner Haie	DEL	27	—	—	—	1,560	64	1	2.46	.926	9	6	3	533	27	1	3.03	.898
2006–07	Fresno Falcons	ECHL	3	1	2	0	180	7	0	2.34	.929	—	—	—	—	—	—	—	—
2006–07	Worcester Sharks	AHL	43	26	15	2	2,555	111	0	2.61	.912	3	0	3	172	12	0	4.18	.865
2007–08	Worcester Sharks	AHL	41	18	21	2	2,424	125	0	3.09	.892	—	—	—	—	—	—	—	—
2007–08	San Jose Sharks	NHL	3	0	1	1	129	7	0	3.26	.860	—	—	—	—	—	—	—	—
2008–09	Worcester Sharks	AHL	57	34	20	2	3,346	138	1	2.47	.910	12	6	6	742	30	2	2.43	.912
2009–10	San Jose Sharks	NHL	16	7	4	1	782	35	0	2.68	.912	1	0	0	40	2	0	3.00	.929
2010–11	Brynäs IF	SEL	32	—	—	—	1,850	90	2	2.92	.901	—	—	—	—	—	—	—	—
2011–12	San Jose Sharks	NHL	19	9	7	1	1,043	40	0	2.30	.915	—	—	—	—	—	—	—	—
2012–13	Hannover Scorpions	DEL	9	3	6	0	535	31	0	3.47	.905	—	—	—	—	—	—	—	—
2012–13	San Jose Sharks	NHL	6	1	4	0	308	13	1	2.53	.915	—	—	—	—	—	—	—	—
2012–13	Worcester Sharks	AHL	1	0	1	0	60	5	0	5.04	.815	—	—	—	—	—	—	—	—
2013–14	Phoenix Coyotes	NHL	25	10	8	5	1,312	50	2	2.29	.920	—	—	—	—	—	—	—	—
2014–15	Pittsburgh Penguins	NHL	20	9	6	3	1,159	50	0	2.59	.908	—	—	—	—	—	—	—	—
2015–16	New York Islanders	NHL	41	23	11	4	2,288	90	1	2.36	.925	11	5	6	734	30	0	2.46	.923
2016–17	New York Islanders	NHL	51	26	18	5	2,814	126	3	2.69	.913	—	—	—	—	—	—	—	—
2017–18	New York Islanders	NHL	27	13	8	2	1,492	95	1	3.82	.892	—	—	—	—	—	—	—	—
2018–19	New York Islanders	NHL	43	23	14	2	2,294	87	5	2.28	.927	1	0	0	36	2	0	3.33	.800
2019–20	New York Islanders	NHL	31	16	9	4	1,596	73	0	2.74	.913	4	2	2	178	6	1	2.02	.929
2020–21	Detroit Red Wings	NHL	34	8	15	8	1,756	79	2	2.70	.912	—	—	—	—	—	—	—	—
2021–22	Detroit Red Wings	NHL	31	10	15	1	1,508	92	0	3.66	.891	—	—	—	—	—	—	—	—
2022–23	St. Louis Blues	NHL	21	7	10	0	1,090	66	1	3.64	.896	—	—	—	—	—	—	—	—
2024–25	Löwen Frankfurt	DEL	13	4	8	0	619	37	0	3.59	.886	—	—	—	—	—	—	—	—
NHL totals			368	162	130	37	19,569	903	16	2.77	.911	17	7	8	988	40	1	2.43	.922

=== International ===
Year	Team	Event	GP	W	L	T	MIN	GA	SO	GAA	SV%
2003	Germany	WJC18-D1	2	2	0	0	120	2	0	1.00	.955
2004	Germany	WJC18-D1	3	2	0	0	140	8	0	3.43	.867
2004	Germany	WJC-D1	2	2	0	0	—	—	—	1.51	.909
2005	Germany	WJC	3	0	2	0	104	13	0	7.50	.806
2006	Germany	WJC-D1	4	4	0	0	240	2	2	0.50	.978
2006	Germany	OLY	1	0	1	0	60	5	0	5.00	.875
2006	Germany	WC-D1	2	1	0	0	61	2	0	1.97	.882
2010	Germany	OLY	3	0	3	0	179	15	0	5.03	.815
2016	Germany	WC	4	3	1	0	240	10	0	2.50	.904
Junior totals			15	10	2	0	—	—	—	—	—
Senior totals			10	4	5	0	540	32	0	3.56	—

== Awards and honours ==
Award	Year
NHL
William M. Jennings Trophy	2019
