= List of 2013–14 NHL Three Star Awards =

The 2013–14 NHL Three Star Awards are the way the National Hockey League denotes its players of the week and players of the month of the 2013–14 season.

== Weekly ==
Weekly
Week	First Star	Second Star	Third Star
October 6, 2013	Alexander Ovechkin (Washington Capitals)	Lars Eller (Montreal Canadiens)	Marc-Andre Fleury (Pittsburgh Penguins)
October 13, 2013	Tomas Hertl (San Jose Sharks)	Semyon Varlamov; Jean-Sebastien Giguere (Colorado Avalanche)	Sidney Crosby (Pittsburgh Penguins)
October 20, 2013	Jonas Gustavsson (Detroit Red Wings)	Sidney Crosby (Pittsburgh Penguins)	Patrick Marleau (San Jose Sharks)
October 27, 2013	Steven Stamkos (Tampa Bay Lightning)	Phil Kessel (Toronto Maple Leafs)	Ryan Kesler (Vancouver Canucks)
November 3, 2013	Jason Pominville (Minnesota Wild)	Marc-Andre Fleury (Pittsburgh Penguins)	Jason Chimera (Washington Capitals)
November 10, 2013	Robin Lehner (Ottawa Senators)	Frederik Andersen (Anaheim Ducks)	Patrick Sharp (Chicago Blackhawks)
November 17, 2013	Ben Scrivens (Los Angeles Kings)	Tyler Seguin (Dallas Stars)	Josh Harding (Minnesota Wild)
November 24, 2013	Evgeni Malkin (Pittsburgh Penguins)	Max Pacioretty (Montreal Canadiens)	Devan Dubnyk (Edmonton Oilers)
December 1, 2013	Evgeni Malkin (Pittsburgh Penguins)	Niklas Kronwall (Detroit Red Wings)	Duncan Keith (Chicago Blackhawks)
December 8, 2013	Jeff Skinner (Carolina Hurricanes)	Taylor Hall (Edmonton Oilers)	Roberto Luongo (Vancouver Canucks)
December 15, 2013	Alexander Ovechkin (Washington Capitals)	Martin Jones (Los Angeles Kings)	Carter Hutton (Nashville Predators)
December 22, 2013	Chris Stewart (St. Louis Blues)	Sidney Crosby (Pittsburgh Penguins)	Matt Duchene (Colorado Avalanche)
December 29, 2013	Patrick Sharp (Chicago Blackhawks)	Ryan Miller (Buffalo Sabres)	James Neal (Pittsburgh Penguins)
January 5, 2014	Jeff Skinner (Carolina Hurricanes)	Brian Elliott (St. Louis Blues)	Ryan Suter (Minnesota Wild)
January 12, 2014	John Tavares (New York Islanders)	Jonas Hiller (Anaheim Ducks)	Henrik Lundqvist (New York Rangers)
January 19, 2014	Martin St. Louis (Tampa Bay Lightning)	Jonathan Quick (Los Angeles Kings)	Corey Crawford (Chicago Blackhawks)
January 26, 2014	Kari Lehtonen (Dallas Stars)	Gustav Nyquist (Detroit Red Wings)	Andrej Sekera (Carolina Hurricanes)
February 2, 2014	Zach Parise (Minnesota Wild)	Phil Kessel (Toronto Maple Leafs)	Mikael Backlund (Calgary Flames)
February 9, 2014	Carey Price (Montreal Canadiens)	Kari Lehtonen (Dallas Stars)	Jarome Iginla (Boston Bruins)
March 2, 2014	Johan Franzen (Detroit Red Wings)	Adam Henrique (New Jersey Devils)	Darcy Kuemper (Minnesota Wild)
March 9, 2014	Tyler Seguin (Dallas Stars)	Artem Anisimov (Columbus Blue Jackets)	Adam Henrique (New Jersey Devils)
March 16, 2014	Sergei Bobrovsky (Columbus Blue Jackets)	Kyle Okposo (New York Islanders)	Antti Niemi (San Jose Sharks)
March 23, 2014	Gustav Nyquist (Detroit Red Wings)	Henrik Lundqvist (New York Rangers)	Jarome Iginla (Boston Bruins)
March 30, 2014	Kyle Turris (Ottawa Senators)	Patrice Bergeron (Boston Bruins)	T. J. Oshie (St. Louis Blues)
April 6, 2014	Taylor Hall (Edmonton Oilers)	Semyon Varlamov (Colorado Avalanche)	Max Pacioretty (Montreal Canadiens)
April 13, 2014	Anders Lindback (Tampa Bay Lightning)	John Gibson (Anaheim Ducks)	Ryan Johansen (Columbus Blue Jackets)

== Monthly ==
Monthly
Month	First Star	Second Star	Third Star
October	Alexander Steen (St. Louis Blues)	Sidney Crosby (Pittsburgh Penguins)	Antti Niemi (San Jose Sharks)
November	Patrick Kane (Chicago Blackhawks)	Evgeni Malkin (Pittsburgh Penguins)	Josh Harding (Minnesota Wild)
December	Patrick Kane (Chicago Blackhawks)	Sidney Crosby (Pittsburgh Penguins)	Jonas Hiller (Anaheim Ducks)
January	Anton Khudobin (Carolina Hurricanes)	Phil Kessel (Toronto Maple Leafs)	Joe Pavelski (San Jose Sharks)
March	Jarome Iginla (Boston Bruins)	Gustav Nyquist (Detroit Red Wings)	Claude Giroux (Philadelphia Flyers)

- No February stars were named due to the Olympic break

== Rookie of the month ==
Rookie of the Month
Month	Player
October	Tomáš Hertl (San Jose Sharks)
November	Marek Mazanec (Nashville Predators)
December	Martin Jones (Los Angeles Kings); Antti Raanta (Chicago Blackhawks)
January	Ondřej Palát (Tampa Bay Lightning)
March	Ondřej Palát (Tampa Bay Lightning)

- No February stars were named due to the Olympic break

== See also ==
- Three stars (ice hockey)
- 2013–14 NHL season
- 2013–14 NHL suspensions and fines
- 2013–14 NHL transactions
- 2013 NHL entry draft
- 2013 in sports
- 2014 in sports
- 2012–13 NHL Three Star Awards
