= 2013–14 New York Islanders season =

NHL hockey team season

2013–14 New York Islanders
- Division: 8th Metropolitan
- Conference: 14th Eastern
- 2013–14 record: 34–37–11
- Home record: 13–19–9
- Road record: 21–18–2
- Goals for: 225
- Goals against: 267

Team information
- General manager: Garth Snow
- Coach: Jack Capuano
- Captain: John Tavares
- Alternate captains: Kyle Okposo; Andrew MacDonald (Oct.–Mar.); Travis Hamonic (Mar.–Apr.); Frans Nielsen (Mar.–Apr.)
- Arena: Nassau Veterans Memorial Coliseum
- Average attendance: 14,832 (94.2%) (38 games)
- Minor league affiliate: Bridgeport Sound Tigers (AHL)

Team leaders
- Goals: Kyle Okposo (27)
- Assists: John Tavares; Kyle Okposo (42)
- Points: Kyle Okposo (69)
- Penalty minutes: Matt Carkner (149)
- Plus/minus: Thomas Hickey (+5)
- Wins: Evgeni Nabokov (15)
- Goals against average: Evgeni Nabokov (2.74)

The 2013–14 New York Islanders season was the 42nd season in the franchise's history. The Islanders finished last in the Metropolitan Division and did not qualify for the National Hockey League (NHL) playoffs.

== Regular season ==
=== Stadium Series ===
The Islanders played against their rivals, the New York Rangers, at the 2014 NHL Stadium Series at Yankee Stadium in The Bronx, New York City, on January 29, 2014. The Rangers won the game 2–1.

== Standings ==
Metropolitan Division
Pos	Team	GP	W	L	OTL	ROW	GF	GA	GD	Pts
1	y – Pittsburgh Penguins	82	51	24	7	44	249	207	+42	109
2	x – New York Rangers	82	45	31	6	41	218	193	+25	96
3	x – Philadelphia Flyers	82	42	30	10	39	236	235	+1	94
4	x – Columbus Blue Jackets	82	43	32	7	38	231	216	+15	93
5	Washington Capitals	82	38	30	14	28	235	240	−5	90
6	New Jersey Devils	82	35	29	18	35	197	208	−11	88
7	Carolina Hurricanes	82	36	35	11	34	207	230	−23	83
8	New York Islanders	82	34	37	11	25	225	267	−42	79

Source: National Hockey League
x – Clinched playoff spot; y – Clinched division

Eastern Conference Wild Card
Pos	Div	Team	GP	W	L	OTL	ROW	GF	GA	GD	Pts
1	ME	x – Columbus Blue Jackets	82	43	32	7	38	231	216	+15	93
2	AT	x – Detroit Red Wings	82	39	28	15	34	222	230	−8	93
3	ME	Washington Capitals	82	38	30	14	28	235	240	−5	90
4	ME	New Jersey Devils	82	35	29	18	35	197	208	−11	88
5	AT	Ottawa Senators	82	37	31	14	30	236	265	−29	88
6	AT	Toronto Maple Leafs	82	38	36	8	29	231	256	−25	84
7	ME	Carolina Hurricanes	82	36	35	11	34	207	230	−23	83
8	ME	New York Islanders	82	34	37	11	25	225	267	−42	79
9	AT	Florida Panthers	82	29	45	8	21	196	268	−72	66
10	AT	Buffalo Sabres	82	21	51	10	14	157	248	−91	52

Source: National Hockey League
x – Clinched playoff spot

== Schedule and results ==
=== Pre-season ===
2013 preseason game log: 4–4–0 (Home: 2–2–0; Road: 2–2–0)
#	Date	Visitor	Score	Home	OT	Decision	Attendance	Record	Recap
1	September 17	NY Islanders	3–5	Calgary		Nilsson	19,289	0–1–0	Recap
2^{[a]}	September 17	Calgary	4–2	NY Islanders		Reiter	4,189	0–2–0	Recap
3	September 19	NY Islanders	5–3	New Jersey		Poulin	11,209	1–2–0	Recap
4^{[b]}	September 21	New Jersey	3–0	NY Islanders		Nabokov	14,689	1–3–0	Recap
5	September 22	NY Islanders	0–2	Nashville		Nilsson	15,502	1–4–0	Recap
6	September 27	Nashville	4–6	NY Islanders		Nabokov	9,338	2–4–0	Recap
7	September 29	NY Islanders	4–1	Ottawa		Nabokov	15,321	3–4–0	Recap
8^{[c]}	September 29	Ottawa	2–5	NY Islanders		Poulin	3,000	4–4–0	Recap
Notes:^{a} Game was played at Brandt Centre in Regina, Saskatchewan.^{b} Game was played at Barclays Center in Brooklyn, New York.^{c} Game was played at Molson Centre in Barrie, Ontario.

=== Regular season ===
2013–14 Game Log

October: 4–5–3 (Home: 2–3–3; Road: 2–2–0)
#	Date	Visitor	Score	Home	OT	Decision	Attendance	Record	Pts	Recap
1	October 4	NY Islanders	4–3	New Jersey	SO	Nabokov	16,624	1–0–0	2	Recap
2	October 5	Columbus	3–2	NY Islanders	SO	Nabokov	16,170	1–0–1	3	Recap
3	October 8	Phoenix	1–6	NY Islanders		Nabokov	10,288	2–0–1	5	Recap
4	October 11	NY Islanders	2–3	Chicago		Poulin	21,196	2–1–1	5	Recap
5	October 12	NY Islanders	2–3	Nashville		Nabokov	17,113	2–2–1	5	Recap
6	October 15	Buffalo	4–3	NY Islanders	SO	Nabokov	10,512	2–2–2	6	Recap
7	October 17	Edmonton	2–3	NY Islanders		Nabokov	10,608	3–2–2	8	Recap
8	October 19	Carolina	4–3	NY Islanders		Nabokov	13,008	3–3–2	8	Recap
9	October 22	Vancouver	5–4	NY Islanders	OT	Nabokov	11,922	3–3–3	9	Recap
10	October 25	NY Islanders	4–3	Pittsburgh		Nabokov	18,664	4–3–3	11	Recap
11	October 26	Philadelphia	5–2	NY Islanders		Poulin	13,620	4–4–3	11	Recap
12	October 29	NY Rangers	3–2	NY Islanders		Nabokov	16,170	4–5–3	11	Recap

November: 4–10–1 (Home: 3–3–1; Road: 1–7–0)
#	Date	Visitor	Score	Home	OT	Decision	Attendance	Record	Pts	Recap
13	November 1	NY Islanders	5–4	Ottawa	SO	Nabokov	15,589	5–5–3	13	Recap
14	November 2	Boston	1–3	NY Islanders		Poulin	14,018	6–5–3	15	Recap
15	November 5	NY Islanders	2–6	Washington		Nabokov	18,506	6–6–3	15	Recap
16	November 7	NY Islanders	0–1	Carolina		Poulin	11,541	6–7–3	15	Recap
17	November 9	NY Islanders	2–5	Columbus		Nabokov	13,949	6–8–3	15	Recap
18	November 10	NY Islanders	2–4	Montreal		Poulin	21,273	6–9–3	15	Recap
19	November 12	Nashville	1–3	NY Islanders		Poulin	12,108	7–9–3	17	Recap
20	November 14	Los Angeles	3–2	NY Islanders		Poulin	13,922	7–10–3	17	Recap
21	November 16	Detroit	4–5	NY Islanders	SO	Poulin	15,619	8–10–3	19	Recap
22	November 19	NY Islanders	2–5	Toronto		Poulin	19,446	8–11–3	19	Recap
23	November 22	NY Islanders	3–4	Pittsburgh		Poulin	18,515	8–12–3	19	Recap
24	November 23	NY Islanders	2–5	Philadelphia		Poulin	19,829	8–13–3	19	Recap
25	November 27	Winnipeg	3–2	NY Islanders		Poulin	12,008	8–14–3	19	Recap
26	November 29	Detroit	5–0	NY Islanders		Poulin	14,826	8–15–3	19	Recap
27	November 30	Washington	3–2	NY Islanders	OT	Nilsson	14,819	8–15–4	20	Recap

December: 5–6–3 (Home: 0–2–3; Road: 5–4–0)
#	Date	Visitor	Score	Home	OT	Decision	Attendance	Record	Pts	Recap
28	December 3	Pittsburgh	3–2	NY Islanders	OT	Nilsson	13,915	8–15–5	21	Recap
29	December 5	NY Islanders	1–5	St. Louis		Nilsson	14,152	8–16–5	21	Recap
30	December 7	NY Islanders	0–3	Los Angeles		Poulin	18,118	8–17–5	21	Recap
31	December 9	NY Islanders	2–5	Anaheim		Nilsson	14,830	8–18–5	21	Recap
32	December 10	NY Islanders	3–2	San Jose	SO	Poulin	17,562	9–18–5	23	Recap
33	December 12	NY Islanders	3–6	Phoenix		Poulin	10,996	9–19–5	23	Recap
34	December 14	Montreal	1–0	NY Islanders	OT	Nabokov	14,408	9–19–6	24	Recap
35	December 17	Tampa Bay	3–2	NY Islanders	SO	Nabokov	13,618	9–19–7	25	Recap
36	December 20	NY Islanders	5–3	NY Rangers		Nabokov	18,006	10–19–7	27	Recap
37	December 21	Anaheim	5–3	NY Islanders		Nabokov	13,108	10–20–7	27	Recap
38	December 23	NY Islanders	3–0	Detroit		Nabokov	20,066	11–20–7	29	Recap
39	December 28	New Jersey	2–1	NY Islanders		Nabokov	16,012	11–21–7	29	Recap
40	December 29	NY Islanders	5–4	Minnesota		Poulin	18,851	12–21–7	31	Recap
41	December 31	NY Islanders	5–3	Boston		Nabokov	17,565	13–21–7	33	Recap

January: 8–7–1 (Home: 3–4–1; Road: 5–3–0)
#	Date	Visitor	Score	Home	OT	Decision	Attendance	Record	Pts	Recap
42	January 2	Chicago	2–3	NY Islanders	OT	Nabokov	13,618	14–21–7	35	Recap
43	January 4	Carolina	3–2	NY Islanders		Nabokov	14,208	14–22–7	35	Recap
44	January 6	Dallas	3–7	NY Islanders		Poulin	11,111	15–22–7	37	Recap
45	January 7	NY Islanders	5–3	Toronto		Poulin	19,164	16–22–7	39	Recap
46	January 10	NY Islanders	2–1	Colorado	OT	Poulin	17,430	17–22–7	41	Recap
47	January 12	NY Islanders	4–2	Dallas		Poulin	13,765	18–22–7	43	Recap
48	January 14	NY Islanders	2–4	Florida		Poulin	13,730	18–23–7	43	Recap
49	January 16	NY Islanders	2–1	Tampa Bay	SO	Poulin	18,333	19–23–7	45	Recap
50	January 18	NY Islanders	4–6	Philadelphia		Poulin	19,992	19–24–7	45	Recap
51	January 20	Philadelphia	3–4	NY Islanders	SO	Nilsson	16,048	20–24–7	47	Recap
52	January 21	NY Islanders	5–3	NY Rangers		Poulin	18,006	21–24–7	49	Recap
53	January 23	Pittsburgh	6–4	NY Islanders		Poulin	15,012	21–25–7	49	Recap
54	January 25	St. Louis	4–3	NY Islanders	SO	Poulin	15,888	21–25–8	50	Recap
55	January 27	Boston	6–3	NY Islanders		Poulin	13,819	21–26–8	50	Recap
56	January 29 (outdoor game)	NY Rangers	2–1	NY Islanders		Nabokov	50,027 (at Yankee Stadium)	21–27–8	50	Recap
57	January 31	NY Islanders	1–4	NY Rangers		Nabokov	18,006	21–28–8	50	Recap

February: 2–2–0 (Home: 1–2–0; Road: 1–0–0)
#	Date	Visitor	Score	Home	OT	Decision	Attendance	Record	Pts	Recap
58	February 4	NY Islanders	1–0	Washington		Nabokov	18,506	22–28–8	52	Recap
59	February 6	Calgary	4–2	NY Islanders		Nabokov	12,888	22–29–8	52	Recap
60	February 8	Colorado	4-2	NY Islanders		Nabokov	15,360	22–30–8	52	Recap
61	February 27	Toronto	4–5	NY Islanders	OT	Nabokov	13,922	23–30–8	54	Recap

March: 5–5–3 (Home: 2–4–1; Road: 3–1–2)
#	Date	Visitor	Score	Home	OT	Decision	Attendance	Record	Pts	Recap
62	March 1	New Jersey	6–1	NY Islanders		Nabokov	15,512	23–31–8	54	Recap
63	March 2	Florida	5–3	NY Islanders		Nilsson	13,008	23–32–8	54	Recap
64	March 4	NY Islanders	3–2	Winnipeg	OT	Nilsson	15,004	24–32–8	56	Recap
65	March 6	NY Islanders	2–3	Edmonton	OT	Nabokov	16,839	24–32–9	57	Recap
66	March 7	NY Islanders	3–4	Calgary		Nilsson	19,289	24–33–9	57	Recap
67	March 10	NY Islanders	7–4	Vancouver		Nabokov	18,910	25–33–9	59	Recap
68	March 14	San Jose	4–3	NY Islanders		Nabokov	13,128	25–34–9	59	Recap
69	March 15	Buffalo	1–4	NY Islanders		Nilsson	14,388	26–34–9	61	Recap
70	March 18	Minnesota	6–0	NY Islanders		Nilsson	14,888	26–35–9	61	Recap
71	March 23	Columbus	0–2	NY Islanders		Nabokov	15,008	27–35–9	63	Recap
72	March 25	NY Islanders	5–4	Carolina		Nilsson	15,176	28–35–9	65	Recap
73	March 27	NY Islanders	2–3	Tampa Bay	SO	Nabokov	18,554	28–35–10	66	Recap
74	March 29	New Jersey	1–2	NY Islanders	SO	Nilsson	15,108	29–35–10	68	Recap

April: 5–2–1 (Home: 1–1–1; Road: 4–1–0)
#	Date	Visitor	Score	Home	OT	Decision	Attendance	Record	Pts	Recap
75	April 1	Florida	2–4	NY Islanders		Nabokov	11,812	30–35–10	70	Recap
76	April 2	NY Islanders	2–1	Ottawa		Nilsson	16,516	31–35–10	72	Recap
77	April 5	Washington	4–3	NY Islanders	SO	Nabokov	16,008	31–35–11	73	Recap
78	April 6	NY Islanders	0–4	Columbus		Nilsson	15,667	31–36–11	73	Recap
79	April 8	Ottawa	4–1	NY Islanders		Nilsson	12,922	31–37–11	73	Recap
80	April 10	NY Islanders	2–0	Montreal		Nabokov	21,273	32–37–11	75	Recap
81	April 11	NY Islanders	3–2	New Jersey	SO	Nilsson	15,858	33–37–11	77	Recap
82	April 13	NY Islanders	4–3	Buffalo	SO	Nilsson	18,804	34–37–11	79	Recap

Legend: Win (2 points) Loss (0 points) Overtime/shootout loss (1 point)

== Playoffs ==
The Islanders failed to make the playoffs despite qualifying the previous year in 2012–13.

== Injuries ==
=== Pre-season ===
Player	Injury	Date	Returned	Games missed
Cal Clutterbuck	Lower-body-injury (leg)	September 17, 2013	—	6 games

=== Regular season ===
Updated as of January 12, 2014

Player	Injury	Date	Returned	Games missed
Cal Clutterbuck	Lower-body-injury	From pre-season	October 11, 2013	3 games
Lubomir Visnovsky	Concussion	October 20, 2013		39 games
Brian Strait	Upper-body-injury	October 22, 2013	December 12, 2013	23 games
Evgeni Nabokov	Lower-body-injury (groin)	November 16, 2013	December 12, 2013	11 games
Radek Martinek	Upper-body-injury (back)	December 12, 2013		15 games
Evgeni Nabokov	Lower-body-injury	January 6, 2014		3 games
Frans Nielsen	Broken hand	February 8, 2014	March 2, 2014	3 games
John Tavares	MCL and meniscus tear	February 19, 2014	N/A	22 games

== Suspensions/fines ==
Player	Explanation	Length	Salary	Date issued
Frans Nielsen	Slashing Phoenix Coyotes forward Martin Hanzal in NHL Game No. 38 on Long Island on Tuesday, October 8, 2013, at 13:42 of the third period.	Fine	$5,000	October 10, 2013
Michael Grabner	An illegal check to the head of Carolina Hurricanes forward Nathan Gerbe during NHL Game No. 117 on Long Island on Saturday, October 19, 2013, at approximately 6:42 of the first period.	2 games	$30,769.24	October 21, 2013

== Player statistics ==
Final stats

Skaters

Regular season
Player	GP	G	A	Pts	+/−	PIM
Kyle Okposo	71	27	42	69	−9	51
John Tavares	59	24	42	66	−6	40
Frans Nielsen	80	25	33	58	−11	8
Thomas Vanek^{†‡}	47	17	27	44	4	34
Josh Bailey	77	8	30	38	−8	26
Brock Nelson	72	14	12	26	−10	12
Michael Grabner	64	12	14	26	−10	12
Andrew MacDonald^{‡}	63	4	20	24	−19	34
Thomas Hickey	82	4	18	22	5	34
Cal Clutterbuck	73	12	7	19	−9	50
Colin McDonald	70	8	10	18	−22	34
Ryan Strome	37	7	11	18	−1	8
Travis Hamonic	69	3	15	18	2	68
Casey Cizikas	80	6	10	16	−12	30
Calvin de Haan	51	3	13	16	−7	30
Matt Donovan	52	2	14	16	−9	26
Anders Lee	22	9	5	14	3	14
Matt Martin	79	8	6	14	−11	90
Lubomir Visnovsky	24	3	8	11	−1	10
Matt Moulson^{‡}	11	6	3	9	3	6
Pierre-Marc Bouchard^{‡}	28	4	5	9	−9	12
Brian Strait	47	3	6	9	−14	14
Peter Regin^{‡}	44	2	5	7	−10	18
Eric Boulton	23	2	2	4	0	88
Aaron Ness	20	1	2	3	−13	10
Matt Carkner	53	0	3	3	−10	149
Radek Martinek	13	0	3	3	4	4
Kevin Czuczman	13	0	2	2	−5	14
Mike Halmo	20	1	0	1	−1	32
John Persson	10	1	0	1	−4	6
Johan Sundstrom	11	0	1	1	0	6
Brett Gallant	4	0	0	0	0	17
Scott Mayfield	5	0	0	0	−3	7
Justin Johnson	2	0	0	0	−1	7

Goaltenders

Regular season
Player	GP	GS	TOI	W	L	OT	GA	GAA	SA	SV%	SO	G	A	PIM
Evgeni Nabokov	40	39	2,254:14	15	14	8	103	2.74	1085	0.905	4	0	1	4
Kevin Poulin	28	26	1,625:19	11	16	1	89	3.29	820	0.891	0	0	0	0
Anders Nilsson	19	17	1,101:10	8	7	2	57	3.11	548	0.896	0	0	0	2

^{†}Denotes player spent time with another team before joining the Islanders. Stats reflect time with the Islanders only.
^{‡}Denotes player was traded mid-season. Stats reflect time with the Islanders only.
Bold/italics denotes franchise record.

== Transactions ==
The Islanders have been involved in the following transactions during the 2013–14 season:

=== Trades ===
June 30, 2013	To Minnesota Wild Nino Niederreiter	To New York Islanders Cal Clutterbuck; NJD's 3rd-round draft pick in 2013
October 27, 2013	To Buffalo Sabres Matt Moulson conditional 1st-round draft pick in 2014; 2nd-round draft pick in 2015	To New York Islanders Thomas Vanek
February 6, 2014	To Chicago Blackhawks Peter Regin; Pierre-Marc Bouchard	To New York Islanders 4th-round draft pick in 2014
March 4, 2014	To Philadelphia Flyers Andrew MacDonald	To New York Islanders Matt Mangene; 3rd-round draft pick in 2014; 2nd-round draft pick in 2015
March 5, 2014	To Montreal Canadiens Thomas Vanek; Conditional 5th-round draft pick in 2014	To New York Islanders Sebastian Collberg; Conditional 2nd-round draft pick in 2014
May 1, 2014	To Washington Capitals CHI's 4th-round draft pick in 2014	To New York Islanders Jaroslav Halak (rights)
June 5, 2014	To San Jose Sharks Conditional 5th-round draft pick in 2015	To New York Islanders Dan Boyle (rights)

=== Free agents acquired ===
Player	Former team	Contract terms
Peter Regin	Ottawa Senators	1 year, $750,000
Pierre-Marc Bouchard	Minnesota Wild	1 year, $2 million
Kevin Czuczman	Lake Superior State University	2 years, $2.7 million entry-level contract

=== Free agents lost ===
Player	New team	Contract terms
Jesse Joensuu	Edmonton Oilers	2 years, $1.9 million
Keith Aucoin	St. Louis Blues	1 year, $625,000
Matt Watkins	Washington Capitals	1 year, $550,000
Jon Landry	Minnesota Wild	1 year, $625,000
Brandon DeFazio	Vancouver Canucks	1 year, $550,000
Brad Boyes	Florida Panthers	1 year, $1 million

=== Player signings ===
Player	Date	Contract terms
Evgeni Nabokov	July 5, 2013	1 year, $3.25 million
Travis Hamonic	July 5, 2013	7 years, $27 million
Kevin Poulin	July 8, 2013	1 year, $577,500
Cal Clutterbuck	July 9, 2013	4 years, $11 million
Josh Bailey	July 15, 2013	5 years, $16.5 million
Thomas Hickey	July 18, 2013	2 years, $1.35 million
Ryan Pulock	September 29, 2013	3 years, $4.275 million entry-level contract
Radek Martinek	October 23, 2013	1 year, $600,000
Adam Pelech	March 15, 2014	3 years, $2.563 million entry-level contract
Eric Boulton	March 23, 2014	1 year, $775,000 contract extension
Loic Leduc	April 28, 2014	3 years, $1.845 million entry-level contract
Jaroslav Halak	May 22, 2014	4 years, $18 million
Ville Pokka	May 28, 2014	3 years, $5.325 million entry-level contract
Jesse Graham	May 31, 2014	3 years, $1.815 million entry-level contract

== Draft picks ==
New York Islanders' picks at the 2013 NHL entry draft, which was held in Newark, New Jersey on June 30, 2013.

Round	#	Player	Pos	Nationality	College/Junior/Club team (League)
1	15	Ryan Pulock	Defence	Canada	Brandon Wheat Kings (WHL)
3	70^{[a]}	Eamon McAdam	Goaltender	United States	Waterloo Black Hawks (USHL)
3	76	Taylor Cammarata	Center/Left Wing	United States	Waterloo Black Hawks (USHL)
4	106	Stephon Williams	Goaltender	United States	Minnesota State (WCHA)
5	136	Victor Crus Rydberg	Center	Sweden	Linköpings HC (Sweden–Jr)
6	166	Alan Quine	Center	Canada	Belleville Bulls (OHL)
7	196	Kyle Burroughs	Defence	Canada	Regina Pats (WHL)

Draft notes

- The New York Islanders' second-round pick went to the Anaheim Ducks as the result of a June 22, 2012 trade that sent Lubomir Visnovsky to the Islanders in exchange for this pick.
- ^{a} The New Jersey Devils' third-round pick went to the New York Islanders (via Minnesota) as a result of a June 30, 2013 trade that sent Nino Niederreiter to the Wild in exchange for Cal Clutterbuck and this pick.
