= 2013–14 Ottawa Senators season =

Professional ice hockey team season of play

2013–14 Ottawa Senators
- Division: 5th Atlantic
- Conference: 11th Eastern
- 2013–14 record: 37–31–14
- Home record: 18–17–6
- Road record: 19–14–8
- Goals for: 236
- Goals against: 265

Team information
- General manager: Bryan Murray
- Coach: Paul MacLean
- Captain: Jason Spezza
- Alternate captains: Chris Neil; Chris Phillips
- Arena: Canadian Tire Centre
- Average attendance: 18,109
- Minor league affiliates: Binghamton Senators (AHL); Elmira Jackals (ECHL)

Team leaders
- Goals: Kyle Turris (26)
- Assists: Erik Karlsson (54)
- Points: Erik Karlsson (74)
- Penalty minutes: Chris Neil (211)
- Plus/minus: Kyle Turris (+22)
- Wins: Craig Anderson (25)
- Goals against average: Craig Anderson (3.00)

The 2013–14 Ottawa Senators season was the team's 22nd season in the National Hockey League (NHL). The 2013–14 season was the first season of a re-organization by the NHL of its divisions. Ottawa was placed in a new Atlantic Division with the Boston Bruins, Buffalo Sabres, Detroit Red Wings, Florida Panthers, Montreal Canadiens, Tampa Bay Lightning and Toronto Maple Leafs. The Senators failed to qualify for the 2014 Stanley Cup playoffs.

This was also the team's first season since 1993–94 without long-time captain and Senators legend Daniel Alfredsson. Alfredsson signed with the Detroit Red Wings in July 2013 and played his final season there before retiring from the NHL in late 2014.

== Off-season ==
In June 2013, the Senators traded impending free agent Sergei Gonchar to the Dallas Stars for a sixth-round pick in the 2013 NHL entry draft. The Senators chose Chris Leblanc with the pick.

On July 5, two moves came about that changed the face of the franchise. In a surprise move that shocked Ottawa fans, captain and multiple franchise record holder Daniel Alfredsson signed a contract to play with the Detroit Red Wings, ending his 17-year association with Ottawa. "It pretty much came down to a selfish decision in terms of I have not won a Stanley Cup, a big priority for me," Alfredsson explained in a candid conference call with the media. He continued explaining how hard of a decision it was and gave his reasoning. "I feel that in Ottawa they are getting closer and closer and they have a really bright future in front of them, but at this point in my career there's not much left," Alfredsson said. "I don't have the time to wait for that." In a later press conference, Alfredsson expressed his dissatisfaction in negotiations with the Senators. Alfredsson stated that an understanding to compensate Alfredsson for the low salary he had taken in the 2012–13 season was not lived up to. Alfredsson had taken a below-value $1-million salary in 2012–13 in his contract to lower the long-term salary cap hit for his contract, but was not expecting to play the season. When Alfredsson decided to play the 2012–13 season, he had expected to re-negotiate the contract at that time, but the Senators did not re-open contract negotiations, and Alfredsson decided to play the season at the salary and seek compensation in the 2013–14 contract. The Senators wanted to pay Alfredsson his market value for 2013–14, without any extra to cover 2012–13.

Later on July 5, the Senators made a major trade with the Anaheim Ducks, picking up multiple 30-goal scorer Bobby Ryan. The Senators had to give up first-year player Jakob Silfverberg, junior prospect Stefan Noesen and the team's first-round pick in the 2014 NHL entry draft. Ryan, who had been the subject of many trade rumours, tweeted, "I'm coming in hot, Ottawa," a reference to the film Top Gun. Ryan was expected to play on the top line with Jason Spezza and Milan Michalek.

The Senators signed two free agents, forward Clarke MacArthur from Toronto and defenceman Joe Corvo from Carolina. Corvo had previously played with Ottawa from 2006 to 2008 and was a member of the team that made it to the 2007 Stanley Cup Finals. Forward Peter Regin and defenceman Andre Benoit left the team as free agents, Regin to the New York Islanders and Benoit to Colorado.

== Regular season ==
On December 1, former captain Daniel Alfredsson made his first return visit to Ottawa as a member of the Detroit Red Wings. Alfredsson was honoured with a video tribute before the game and a standing ovation from the fans. Alfredsson scored an empty net goal, enabling him to have scored against all 30 NHL teams. Alfredsson also had an assist on Detroit's first goal. The Red Wings won the game 4–2.

Assistant general manager Tim Murray left the team on January 9, 2014, to become the general manager of the Buffalo Sabres. Director of player personnel Pierre Dorion and director of hockey operations and player development Randy Lee became joint assistant general managers, splitting the duties Tim Murray was responsible for. General manager Bryan Murray's contract was extended for two years on January 13, taking on the additional title of president of hockey operations. After the expiry of two years, Murray is set to become an advisor to the Senators.

The Senators played in the 2014 Heritage Classic game against the Vancouver Canucks on March 2, 2014, at BC Place, Vancouver. The Senators unveiled a white version of their heritage third jersey for the game. The Canucks resurrected a uniform of the Vancouver Millionaires of the Pacific Coast Hockey Association from the 1910s for the game. The Senators won the game 4–2.

At the trade deadline of March 5, the team was four points out of a playoff spot. The team added Ales Hemsky for the stretch run, giving up two draft picks. Winger Cory Conacher and defenceman Joe Corvo were put on waivers, with Conacher being picked up by the Buffalo Sabres. Corvo was not picked up and he was loaned to the Chicago Wolves of the AHL. The Senators also made two minor league deals, sending university player Jeff Costello to the Vancouver Canucks for minor league defenceman Patrick Mullen. Binghamton player Andre Petersson was traded to the Anaheim Ducks for defenceman Alex Grant. Veteran defenceman and assistant captain Chris Phillips was re-signed for two years.

The Senators, whom a lot of media had predicted were going to contend in the Eastern Conference, were eliminated from playoff contention on April 8.

== Standings ==
Atlantic Division
| Pos | Team | GP | W | L | OTL | ROW | GF | GA | GD | Pts |
|---|---|---|---|---|---|---|---|---|---|---|
| 1 | p – Boston Bruins | 82 | 54 | 19 | 9 | 51 | 261 | 177 | +84 | 117 |
| 2 | x – Tampa Bay Lightning | 82 | 46 | 27 | 9 | 38 | 240 | 215 | +25 | 101 |
| 3 | x – Montreal Canadiens | 82 | 46 | 28 | 8 | 40 | 215 | 204 | +11 | 100 |
| 4 | x – Detroit Red Wings | 82 | 39 | 28 | 15 | 34 | 222 | 230 | −8 | 93 |
| 5 | Ottawa Senators | 82 | 37 | 31 | 14 | 30 | 236 | 265 | −29 | 88 |
| 6 | Toronto Maple Leafs | 82 | 38 | 36 | 8 | 29 | 231 | 256 | −25 | 84 |
| 7 | Florida Panthers | 82 | 29 | 45 | 8 | 21 | 196 | 268 | −72 | 66 |
| 8 | Buffalo Sabres | 82 | 21 | 51 | 10 | 14 | 157 | 248 | −91 | 52 |

Source: National Hockey League
p – Clinched Presidents' Trophy; x – Clinched playoff spot

Eastern Conference Wild Card
| Pos | Div | Team | GP | W | L | OTL | ROW | GF | GA | GD | Pts |
|---|---|---|---|---|---|---|---|---|---|---|---|
| 1 | ME | x – Columbus Blue Jackets | 82 | 43 | 32 | 7 | 38 | 231 | 216 | +15 | 93 |
| 2 | AT | x – Detroit Red Wings | 82 | 39 | 28 | 15 | 34 | 222 | 230 | −8 | 93 |
| 3 | ME | Washington Capitals | 82 | 38 | 30 | 14 | 28 | 235 | 240 | −5 | 90 |
| 4 | ME | New Jersey Devils | 82 | 35 | 29 | 18 | 35 | 197 | 208 | −11 | 88 |
| 5 | AT | Ottawa Senators | 82 | 37 | 31 | 14 | 30 | 236 | 265 | −29 | 88 |
| 6 | AT | Toronto Maple Leafs | 82 | 38 | 36 | 8 | 29 | 231 | 256 | −25 | 84 |
| 7 | ME | Carolina Hurricanes | 82 | 36 | 35 | 11 | 34 | 207 | 230 | −23 | 83 |
| 8 | ME | New York Islanders | 82 | 34 | 37 | 11 | 25 | 225 | 267 | −42 | 79 |
| 9 | AT | Florida Panthers | 82 | 29 | 45 | 8 | 21 | 196 | 268 | −72 | 66 |
| 10 | AT | Buffalo Sabres | 82 | 21 | 51 | 10 | 14 | 157 | 248 | −91 | 52 |

Source: National Hockey League
x – Clinched playoff spot

== Schedule and results ==
=== Pre-season ===
2013 preseason game log: 4–4–0 (Home: 2–2–0; Road: 2–2–0)
| # | Date | Visitor | Score | Home | OT | Decision | Attendance | Record | Recap |
|---|---|---|---|---|---|---|---|---|---|
| 1 | September 15 | Ottawa | 3–1 | Winnipeg | | Lehner | 15,004 | 1–0–0 |
| 2^{[a]} | September 16 | Calgary | 2–4 | Ottawa | | Hammond | 6,500 | 2–0–0 |
| 3 | September 19 | Toronto | 3–2 | Ottawa | | Lawson | 16,929 | 2–1–0 |
| 4 | September 24 | Ottawa | 3–2 | Toronto | | Lehner | 19,176 | 3–1–0 |
| 5 | September 25 | Montreal | 2–5 | Ottawa | | Hammond | 16,194 | 4–1–0 |
| 6 | September 26 | Ottawa | 1–3 | Montreal | | Anderson | 21,273 | 4–2–0 |
| 7 | September 29 | NY Islanders | 4–1 | Ottawa | | Anderson | 15,321 | 4–3–0 |
| 8^{[b]} | September 29 | Ottawa | 2–5 | NY Islanders | | Lehner | 3,000 | 4–4–0 |
Notes:^{a} Game was played at Credit Union Centre in Saskatoon, Saskatchewan.^{b} Game was played at Molson Centre in Barrie, Ontario.

=== Regular season ===
2013–14 Game Log (Record: 37–31–14; Home: 18–17–6; Road: 19–14–8)

October: 4–6–2 (Home: 1–3–0; Road: 3–3–2)
| # | Date | Visitor | Score | Home | OT | Decision | Attendance | Record | Pts | Recap |
|---|---|---|---|---|---|---|---|---|---|---|
| 1 | October 4 | Ottawa | 1–0 | Buffalo | | Anderson | 19,070 | 1–0–0 | 2 |
| 2 | October 5 | Ottawa | 4–5 | Toronto | SO | Anderson | 19,552 | 1–0–1 | 3 |
| 3 | October 9 | Ottawa | 3–4 | Los Angeles | OT | Anderson | 18,118 | 1–0–2 | 4 |
| 4 | October 12 | Ottawa | 2–3 | San Jose | | Lehner | 17,562 | 1–1–2 | 4 |
| 5 | October 13 | Ottawa | 1–4 | Anaheim | | Anderson | 17,177 | 1–2–2 | 4 |
| 6 | October 15 | Ottawa | 4–3 | Phoenix | OT | Anderson | 10,594 | 2–2–2 | 6 |
| 7 | October 17 | New Jersey | 2–5 | Ottawa | | Anderson | 18,867 | 3–2–2 | 8 |
| 8 | October 19 | Edmonton | 3–1 | Ottawa | | Lehner | 18,623 | 3–3–2 | 8 |
| 9 | October 23 | Ottawa | 6–1 | Detroit | | Anderson | 20,066 | 4–3–2 | 10 |
| 10 | October 25 | Anaheim | 2–1 | Ottawa | | Anderson | 17,590 | 4–4–2 | 10 |
| 11 | October 27 | San Jose | 5–2 | Ottawa | | Anderson | 17,145 | 4–5–2 | 10 |
| 12 | October 29 | Ottawa | 5–6 | Chicago | | Anderson | 21,123 | 4–6–2 | 10 |

November: 6–6–2 (Home: 3–4–2; Road: 3–2–0)
| # | Date | Visitor | Score | Home | OT | Decision | Attendance | Record | Pts | Recap |
|---|---|---|---|---|---|---|---|---|---|---|
| 13 | November 1 | NY Islanders | 5–4 | Ottawa | SO | Lehner | 15,589 | 4–6–3 | 11 |
| 14 | November 3 | Dallas | 4–3 | Ottawa | SO | Lehner | 18,106 | 4–6–4 | 12 |
| 15 | November 5 | Ottawa | 4–1 | Columbus | | Lehner | 13,122 | 5–6–4 | 14 |
| 16 | November 7 | Montreal | 1–4 | Ottawa | | Lehner | 19,292 | 6–6–4 | 16 |
| 17 | November 9 | Florida | 2–3 | Ottawa | | Lehner | 16,244 | 7–6–4 | 18 |
| 18 | November 12 | Philadelphia | 5–0 | Ottawa | | Anderson | 16,398 | 7–7–4 | 18 |
| 19 | November 15 | Boston | 2–4 | Ottawa | | Anderson | 19,538 | 8–7–4 | 20 |
| 20 | November 17 | Columbus | 4–1 | Ottawa | | Anderson | 15,535 | 8–8–4 | 20 |
| 21 | November 19 | Ottawa | 2–5 | Philadelphia | | Lehner | 19,724 | 8–9–4 | 20 |
| 22 | November 20 | Minnesota | 4–3 | Ottawa | | Anderson | 16,642 | 8–10–4 | 20 |
| 23 | November 23 | Ottawa | 4–2 | Detroit | | Lehner | 20,066 | 9–10–4 | 22 |
| 24 | November 24 | Ottawa | 1–4 | Carolina | | Lehner | 13,657 | 9–11–4 | 22 |
| 25 | November 27 | Ottawa | 6–4 | Washington | | Anderson | 18,506 | 10–11–4 | 24 |
| 26 | November 28 | Vancouver | 5–2 | Ottawa | | Anderson | 17,931 | 10–12–4 | 24 |

December: 7–6–3 (Home: 6–3–2; Road: 1–3–1)
| # | Date | Visitor | Score | Home | OT | Decision | Attendance | Record | Pts | Recap |
|---|---|---|---|---|---|---|---|---|---|---|
| 27 | December 1 | Detroit | 4–2 | Ottawa | | Lehner | 20,011 | 10–13–4 | 24 |
| 28 | December 3 | Ottawa | 4–2 | Florida | | Anderson | 10,074 | 11–13–4 | 26 |
| 29 | December 5 | Ottawa | 1–3 | Tampa Bay | | Lehner | 16,562 | 11–14–4 | 26 |
| 30 | December 7 | Toronto | 4–3 | Ottawa | SO | Anderson | 19,559 | 11–14–5 | 27 |
| 31 | December 9 | Philadelphia | 4–5 | Ottawa | SO | Anderson | 15,786 | 12–14–5 | 29 |
| 32 | December 10 | Ottawa | 1–2 | Buffalo | SO | Lehner | 18,594 | 12–14–6 | 30 |
| 33 | December 12 | Buffalo | 1–2 | Ottawa | | Anderson | 15,578 | 13–14–6 | 32 |
| 34 | December 14 | Los Angeles | 5–2 | Ottawa | | Lehner | 17,140 | 13–15–6 | 32 |
| 35 | December 16 | St. Louis | 2–3 | Ottawa | OT | Lehner | 16,008 | 14–15–6 | 34 |
| 36 | December 18 | Ottawa | 2–5 | New Jersey | | Lehner | 14,032 | 14–16–6 | 34 |
| 37 | December 19 | Florida | 4–2 | Ottawa | | Anderson | 15,927 | 14–17–6 | 34 |
| 38 | December 21 | Phoenix | 4–3 | Ottawa | OT | Anderson | 16,716 | 14–17–7 | 35 |
| 39 | December 23 | Pittsburgh | 0–5 | Ottawa | | Anderson | 19,838 | 15–17–7 | 37 |
| 40 | December 27 | Ottawa | 0–5 | Boston | | Lehner | 17,565 | 15–18–7 | 37 |
| 41 | December 28 | Boston | 3–4 | Ottawa | | Anderson | 20,500 | 16–18–7 | 39 |
| 42 | December 30 | Washington | 1–3 | Ottawa | | Anderson | 20,193 | 17–18–7 | 41 |

January: 7–2–3 (Home: 2–1–1; Road: 5–1–2)
| # | Date | Visitor | Score | Home | OT | Decision | Attendance | Record | Pts | Recap |
|---|---|---|---|---|---|---|---|---|---|---|
| 43 | January 2 | Winnipeg | 3–4 | Ottawa | | Anderson | 18,691 | 18–18–7 | 43 |
| 44 | January 4 | Ottawa | 4–3 | Montreal | OT | Anderson | 21,273 | 19–18–7 | 45 |
| 45 | January 8 | Ottawa | 3–4 | Colorado | OT | Anderson | 12,487 | 19–18–8 | 46 |
| 46 | January 11 | Ottawa | 2–1 | Nashville | SO | Anderson | 17,113 | 20–18–8 | 48 |
| 47 | January 14 | Ottawa | 3–0 | Minnesota | | Lehner | 18,117 | 21–18–8 | 50 |
| 48 | January 16 | Montreal | 5–4 | Ottawa | OT | Anderson | 19,217 | 21–18–9 | 51 |
| 49 | January 18 | NY Rangers | 4–1 | Ottawa | | Anderson | 19,978 | 21–19–9 | 51 |
| 50 | January 21 | Ottawa | 2–0 | Washington | | Anderson | 18,506 | 22–19–9 | 53 |
| 51 | January 23 | Ottawa | 3–4 | Tampa Bay | SO | Anderson | 18,751 | 22–19–10 | 54 |
| – | January 24 | Ottawa | | Carolina | Game rescheduled to January 25 due to effects on Carolina's schedule after a Hurricanes-Flyers game was postponed. |
| 52 | January 25 | Ottawa | 3–6 | Carolina | | Lehner | 11,458 | 22–20–10 | 54 |
| 53 | January 28 | Ottawa | 3–2 | Columbus | | Anderson | 13,373 | 23–20–10 | 56 |
| 54 | January 30 | Tampa Bay | 3–5 | Ottawa | | Anderson | 19,757 | 24–20–10 | 58 |

February: 2–3–1 (Home: 1–1–0; Road: 1–2–1)
| # | Date | Visitor | Score | Home | OT | Decision | Attendance | Record | Pts | Recap |
|---|---|---|---|---|---|---|---|---|---|---|
| 55 | February 1 | Ottawa | 3–6 | Toronto | | Anderson | 19,613 | 24–21–10 | 58 |
| 56 | February 3 | Ottawa | 1–2 | Pittsburgh | OT | Anderson | 18,579 | 24–21–11 | 59 |
| 57 | February 4 | Ottawa | 5–4 | St. Louis | SO | Lehner | 14,758 | 25–21–11 | 61 |
| 58 | February 6 | Buffalo | 2–3 | Ottawa | | Anderson | 18,426 | 26–21–11 | 63 |
| 59 | February 8 | Ottawa | 2–7 | Boston | | Anderson | 17,565 | 26–22–11 | 63 |
| 60 | February 27 | Detroit | 6–1 | Ottawa | | Lehner | 18,931 | 26–23–11 | 63 |

March: 6–6–3 (Home: 3–3–1; Road: 3–3–2)
| # | Date | Visitor | Score | Home | OT | Decision | Attendance | Record | Pts | Recap |
|---|---|---|---|---|---|---|---|---|---|---|
| 61 | March 2 | Ottawa | 4–2 | Vancouver | | Anderson | 54,194 (outdoors) | 27–23–11 | 65 |
| 62 | March 4 | Ottawa | 2–3 | Edmonton | | Anderson | 16,839 | 27–24–11 | 65 |
| 63 | March 5 | Ottawa | 1–4 | Calgary | | Anderson | 19,289 | 27–25–11 | 65 |
| 64 | March 8 | Ottawa | 5–3 | Winnipeg | | Anderson | 15,004 | 28–25–11 | 67 |
| 65 | March 10 | Nashville | 4–3 | Ottawa | OT | Lehner | 19,063 | 28–25–12 | 68 |
| 66 | March 15 | Ottawa | 4–5 | Montreal | OT | Lehner | 21,273 | 28–25–13 | 69 |
| 67 | March 16 | Colorado | 3–1 | Ottawa | | Lehner | 19,501 | 28–26–13 | 69 |
| 68 | March 18 | NY Rangers | 8–4 | Ottawa | | Lehner | 17,326 | 28–27–13 | 69 |
| 69 | March 20 | Tampa Bay | 5–4 | Ottawa | | Lehner | 17,136 | 28–28–13 | 69 |
| 70 | March 22 | Ottawa | 1–3 | Dallas | | Lehner | 16,714 | 28–29–13 | 69 |
| 71 | March 24 | Ottawa | 4–3 | Tampa Bay | SO | Lehner | 18,486 | 29–29–13 | 71 |
| 72 | March 25 | Ottawa | 2–3 | Florida | SO | Lehner | 13,435 | 29–29–14 | 72 |
| 73 | March 28 | Chicago | 3–5 | Ottawa | | Anderson | 18,922 | 30–29–14 | 74 |
| 74 | March 30 | Calgary | 3–6 | Ottawa | | Lehner | 18,505 | 31–29–14 | 76 |
| 75 | March 31 | Carolina | 1–2 | Ottawa | SO | Anderson | 16,732 | 32–29–14 | 78 |

April: 5–2–0 (Home: 2–2–0; Road: 3–0–0)
| # | Date | Visitor | Score | Home | OT | Decision | Attendance | Record | Pts | Recap |
|---|---|---|---|---|---|---|---|---|---|---|
| 76 | April 2 | NY Islanders | 2–1 | Ottawa | | Anderson | 16,516 | 32–30–14 | 78 |
| 77 | April 4 | Montreal | 7–4 | Ottawa | | Anderson | 19,241 | 32–31–14 | 78 |
| 78 | April 5 | Ottawa | 3–2 | NY Rangers | | Lehner | 18,006 | 33–31–14 | 80 |
| 79 | April 8 | Ottawa | 4–1 | NY Islanders | | Anderson | 12,922 | 34–31–14 | 82 |
| 80 | April 10 | New Jersey | 1–2 | Ottawa | SO | Lehner | 19,270 | 35–31–14 | 84 |
| 81 | April 12 | Toronto | 0–1 | Ottawa | | Anderson | 20,500 | 36–31–14 | 86 |
| 82 | April 13 | Ottawa | 3–2 | Pittsburgh | SO | Lehner | 18,663 | 37–31–14 | 88 |

Legend: Win (2 points) Loss (0 points) Overtime/shootout loss (1 point)

== Awards and milestones ==
Regular season
| Player | Milestone | Reached |
|---|---|---|
| Clarke MacArthur | 100th career NHL goal | November 29, 2013 |
| Cody Ceci | 1st Career NHL Game | December 12, 2013 |
| Cody Ceci | 1st Career NHL Goal | December 16, 2013 |
| Mark Stone | 1st Career NHL Goal | January 4, 2014 |
| Chris Neil | 100th Career NHL Goal | January 23, 2014 |
| Milan Michalek | 200th Career NHL Assist | January 30, 2014 |
| Andrew Hammond | 1st Career NHL Game | February 27, 2014 |
| Mike Hoffman | 1st Career NHL Goal; 1st Career NHL Assist | March 8, 2014 |
| Erik Karlsson | 20th Goal of Season (new franchise record for a defenceman) | March 24, 2014 |

== Player statistics ==
Final Stats

Scoring

Regular season
| Player | GP | G | A | Pts | +/− | PIM |
|---|---|---|---|---|---|---|
| Erik Karlsson | 82 | 20 | 54 | 74 | −15 | 36 |
| Jason Spezza | 75 | 23 | 43 | 66 | −26 | 46 |
| Kyle Turris | 82 | 26 | 32 | 58 | 22 | 39 |
| Clarke MacArthur | 79 | 24 | 31 | 55 | 12 | 78 |
| Bobby Ryan | 70 | 23 | 25 | 48 | 7 | 45 |
| Milan Michalek | 82 | 17 | 22 | 39 | −25 | 41 |
| Mika Zibanejad | 69 | 16 | 17 | 33 | −15 | 18 |
| Marc Methot | 75 | 6 | 17 | 23 | 0 | 28 |
| Patrick Wiercioch | 53 | 4 | 19 | 23 | −1 | 20 |
| Zack Smith | 82 | 13 | 9 | 22 | −9 | 111 |
| Cory Conacher^{‡} | 60 | 4 | 16 | 20 | 8 | 34 |
| Colin Greening | 76 | 6 | 11 | 17 | −15 | 41 |
| Ales Hemsky† | 20 | 4 | 13 | 17 | −2 | 4 |
| Erik Condra | 76 | 6 | 10 | 16 | 0 | 30 |
| Jared Cowen | 68 | 6 | 9 | 15 | 0 | 45 |
| Chris Phillips | 70 | 1 | 14 | 15 | −12 | 30 |
| Chris Neil | 76 | 8 | 6 | 14 | −10 | 211 |
| Eric Gryba | 57 | 2 | 9 | 11 | 9 | 64 |
| Joe Corvo | 25 | 3 | 7 | 10 | −7 | 10 |
| Cody Ceci | 49 | 3 | 6 | 9 | −5 | 14 |
| Mark Stone | 19 | 4 | 4 | 8 | 5 | 4 |
| Mike Hoffman | 25 | 3 | 3 | 6 | −2 | 2 |
| Stephane Da Costa | 12 | 3 | 1 | 4 | 2 | 2 |
| Jean-Gabriel Pageau | 28 | 2 | 0 | 2 | −5 | 12 |
| Matt Kassian | 33 | 1 | 1 | 2 | −1 | 63 |
| Derek Grant | 20 | 0 | 2 | 2 | −3 | 4 |
| Mark Borowiecki | 13 | 1 | 0 | 1 | −2 | 48 |

Goaltenders

Regular season
| Player | GP | GS | TOI | W | L | OT | GA | GAA | SA | SV% | SO | G | A | PIM |
|---|---|---|---|---|---|---|---|---|---|---|---|---|---|---|
| Craig Anderson | 53 | 52 | 2,999:44 | 25 | 16 | 8 | 150 | 3.00 | 1680 | .911 | 4 | 0 | 1 | 2 |
| Robin Lehner | 36 | 30 | 1,942:10 | 12 | 15 | 6 | 99 | 3.06 | 1141 | .913 | 1 | 0 | 0 | 4 |
| Andrew Hammond | 1 | 0 | 34:31 | 0 | 0 | 0 | 0 | 0.00 | 11 | 1.000 | 0 | 0 | 0 | 0 |
| Nathan Lawson | 1 | 0 | 11:52 | 0 | 0 | 0 | 2 | 10.11 | 10 | .800 | 0 | 0 | 0 | 0 |

^{†}Denotes player spent time with another team before joining the Senators. Stats reflect time with the Senators only.
^{‡}No longer with team.
Bold/italics denotes franchise record

== Transactions ==
=== Trades ===
| Date | Details |
| July 5, 2013 | To Anaheim Ducks Jakob Silfverberg; Stefan Noesen; 1st-round pick in 2014 | To Ottawa Senators Bobby Ryan |
| July 8, 2013 | To St. Louis Blues Pat Cannone | To Ottawa Senators Future considerations |
| March 4, 2014 | To Vancouver Canucks Jeff Costello | To Ottawa Senators Patrick Mullen |
| March 5, 2014 | To Edmonton Oilers 5th-round pick in 2014; 3rd-round pick in 2015 | To Ottawa Senators Ales Hemsky |
| March 5, 2014 | To Anaheim Ducks Andre Petersson | To Ottawa Senators Alex Grant |

=== Free agents signed ===
| Player | Former team | Date | Contract terms |
| Clarke MacArthur | Toronto Maple Leafs | July 5, 2013 | Two-years, $6.5 million |
| Joe Corvo | Carolina Hurricanes | July 8, 2013 | One-year, $900,000 |
| Ludwig Karlsson | Northeastern University | July 25, 2013 | Two-years, $1.65 million, entry-level contract |

=== Free agents lost ===
| Player | New team | Contract terms |
| Mike Lundin | Barys Astana | One-year |
| Daniel Alfredsson | Detroit Red Wings | One-year, $5.5 million |
| Peter Regin | New York Islanders | One-year, $750,000 |
| Andre Benoit | Colorado Avalanche | One-year, $900,000 |

=== Claimed via waivers ===
| Player | Former team | Date claimed off waivers |

=== Lost via waivers ===
| Player | New team | Date claimed off waivers |
|---|---|---|
| Cory Conacher | Buffalo Sabres | March 5, 2014 |

=== Player signings ===
| Player | Date | Contract terms |
| Nathan Lawson | July 3, 2013 | One year, $650,000 |
| Mark Borowiecki | July 10, 2013 | Two years, $1.15 million |
| David Dziurzynski | July 10, 2013 | One year, $640,000 |
| Erik Condra | July 12, 2013 | Two years, $2.5 million |
| Mike Hoffman | July 18, 2013 | One year, $660,000 |
| Patrick Wiercioch | July 22, 2013 | Three years, $6 million |
| Corey Cowick | July 23, 2013 | One year, $625,000 |
| Stephane Da Costa | August 7, 2013 | One year, $825,000 |
| Colin Greening | September 9, 2013 | Three-year, $7.95 million contract extension |
| Jared Cowen | September 13, 2013 | Four years, $12.4 million |
| Curtis Lazar | September 17, 2013 | Three-year, $3.855 million entry-level contract |
| Chris Phillips | March 5, 2014 | Two-year, $5 million re-sign |
| Garrett Thompson | April 1, 2014 | One-year, $925,000 entry-level contract |
| Chris Driedger | April 1, 2014 | Three-year, $2.265 million entry-level contract |
| Ryan Dzingel | April 2, 2014 | Two-year, $1.43 million entry-level contract |
| Mikael Wikstrand | May 2, 2014 | Three-year, $2.44 million entry-level contract |
| Patrick Mullen | May 22, 2014 | One-year, $700,000 contract extension |
| Max McCormick | May 28, 2014 | Two-year, $1.6 million entry-level contract |
| Mike Hoffman | June 23, 2014 | One year, $750,000 |

== Draft picks ==
Ottawa Senators' picks at the 2013 NHL entry draft, which was held in Newark, New Jersey on June 30, 2013.

| Round | # | Player | Pos | Nationality | College/Junior/Club team (League) |
|---|---|---|---|---|---|
| 1 | 17 | Curtis Lazar | RW/C | Canada | Edmonton Oil Kings (WHL) |
| 3 | 78 | Marcus Hogberg | G | Sweden | Linkopings HC J20 (J20 SuperElit) |
| 4 | 102^{[a]} | Tobias Lindberg | RW | Sweden | Djurgardens IF J20 (J20 SuperElit) |
| 4 | 108 | Ben Harpur | D | Canada | Guelph Storm (OHL) |
| 5 | 138 | Vincent Dunn | C | Canada | Val-d'Or Foreurs (QMJHL) |
| 6 | 161^{[b]} | Chris Leblanc | RW | United States | South Shore Kings (EJHL) |
| 6 | 168 | Quentin Shore | C | United States | University of Denver (WCHA) |

Draft notes

- The Ottawa Senators' second-round pick went to the St. Louis Blues as the result of a February 26, 2012, trade that sent Ben Bishop to the Senators in exchange for this pick.
- ^{a} The Philadelphia Flyers' fourth-round pick went to the Ottawa Senators (via Tampa Bay), the Lightning traded this pick to Ottawa as a result of an April 3, 2013, trade that sent Ben Bishop to the Lightning in exchange for Cory Conacher and this pick.
- ^{b} The Dallas Stars' sixth-round pick went to the Ottawa Senators as a result of a June 7, 2013, trade that sent the rights to Sergei Gonchar to the Stars in exchange for this pick.
- The Ottawa Senators' seventh-round pick went to the Calgary Flames (via Chicago), Ottawa traded this pick to the Chicago Blackhawks as the result of a December 2, 2011, trade that sent Rob Klinkhammer to the Senators in exchange for this pick.
