= 2013–14 Carolina Hurricanes season =

National Hockey League team season

2013–14 Carolina Hurricanes
- Division: 7th Metropolitan
- Conference: 13th Eastern
- 2013–14 record: 36–35–11
- Home record: 18–17–6
- Road record: 18–18–5
- Goals for: 207
- Goals against: 230

Team information
- General manager: Jim Rutherford
- Coach: Kirk Muller
- Captain: Eric Staal
- Alternate captains: Tim Gleason (Oct.–Jan.); Manny Malhotra (Jan.–Apr.); Jordan Staal
- Arena: PNC Arena
- Average attendance: 15,483 (88.4%) (41 games)
- Minor league affiliates: Charlotte Checkers (AHL); Florida Everblades (ECHL)

Team leaders
- Goals: Jeff Skinner (33)
- Assists: Eric Staal (40)
- Points: Eric Staal (61)
- Penalty minutes: Eric Staal (74)
- Plus/minus: John-Michael Liles (+7)
- Wins: Anton Khudobin (19)
- Goals against average: Anton Khudobin (2.30)

The 2013–14 Carolina Hurricanes season was the franchise's 42nd season, its 35th season in the National Hockey League (NHL) since the NHL franchise was granted on June 22, 1979, and 16th season since the franchise relocated from Hartford to start the 1997–98 seasons.

The Hurricanes failed to qualify for the Stanley Cup playoffs for the fifth straight year.

== Standings ==
Metropolitan Division
Pos	Team	GP	W	L	OTL	ROW	GF	GA	GD	Pts
1	y – Pittsburgh Penguins	82	51	24	7	44	249	207	+42	109
2	x – New York Rangers	82	45	31	6	41	218	193	+25	96
3	x – Philadelphia Flyers	82	42	30	10	39	236	235	+1	94
4	x – Columbus Blue Jackets	82	43	32	7	38	231	216	+15	93
5	Washington Capitals	82	38	30	14	28	235	240	−5	90
6	New Jersey Devils	82	35	29	18	35	197	208	−11	88
7	Carolina Hurricanes	82	36	35	11	34	207	230	−23	83
8	New York Islanders	82	34	37	11	25	225	267	−42	79

Source: National Hockey League
x – Clinched playoff spot; y – Clinched division

Eastern Conference Wild Card
Pos	Div	Team	GP	W	L	OTL	ROW	GF	GA	GD	Pts
1	ME	x – Columbus Blue Jackets	82	43	32	7	38	231	216	+15	93
2	AT	x – Detroit Red Wings	82	39	28	15	34	222	230	−8	93
3	ME	Washington Capitals	82	38	30	14	28	235	240	−5	90
4	ME	New Jersey Devils	82	35	29	18	35	197	208	−11	88
5	AT	Ottawa Senators	82	37	31	14	30	236	265	−29	88
6	AT	Toronto Maple Leafs	82	38	36	8	29	231	256	−25	84
7	ME	Carolina Hurricanes	82	36	35	11	34	207	230	−23	83
8	ME	New York Islanders	82	34	37	11	25	225	267	−42	79
9	AT	Florida Panthers	82	29	45	8	21	196	268	−72	66
10	AT	Buffalo Sabres	82	21	51	10	14	157	248	−91	52

Source: National Hockey League
x – Clinched playoff spot

== Schedule and results ==
=== Pre-season ===
2013 preseason game log: 3–3–0 (Home: 1–2–0; Road: 2–1–0)
#	Date	Visitor	Score	Home	OT	Decision	Attendance	Record	Recap
1	September 18	Columbus	5–4	Carolina		Ward	8,178	0–1–0	Recap
2	September 19	Carolina	2–5	Buffalo		Khudobin	17,626	0–2–0	Recap
3^{[a]}	September 20	Montreal	6–0	Carolina		Ward	15,176	0–3–0	Recap
4	September 21	Carolina	3–1	Montreal		Khudobin	21,273	1–3–0	Recap
5	September 26	Carolina	2–1	Columbus		Ward	10,899	2–3–0	Recap
6	September 27	Buffalo	0–1	Carolina		Ward	12,033	3–3–0	Recap
Notes:^{a} Game was played at Pepsi Coliseum in Quebec City.

=== Regular season ===
2013–14 Game Log

October: 4–5–3 (Home: 1–2–3; Road: 3–3–0)
#	Date	Visitor	Score	Home	OT	Decision	Attendance	Record	Pts	Recap
1	October 4	Detroit	3–2	Carolina	OT	Ward	18,680	0–0–1	1	Recap
2	October 6	Philadelphia	1–2	Carolina		Khudobin	16,088	1–0–1	3	Recap
3	October 8	Carolina	2–5	Pittsburgh		Ward	18,451	1–1–1	3	Recap
4	October 10	Carolina	3–2	Washington		Khudobin	18,506	2–1–1	5	Recap
5	October 11	Los Angeles	2–1	Carolina	SO	Ward	16,353	2–1–2	6	Recap
6	October 13	Phoenix	5–3	Carolina		Ward	15,384	2–2–2	6	Recap
7	October 15	Chicago	3–2	Carolina	SO	Ward	16,263	2–2–3	7	Recap
8	October 17	Carolina	3–2	Toronto		Ward	19,277	3–2–3	9	Recap
9	October 19	Carolina	4–3	NY Islanders		Ward	13,008	4–2–3	11	Recap
10	October 24	Carolina	1–3	Minnesota		Peters	17,668	4–3–3	11	Recap
11	October 25	Carolina	2–4	Colorado		Peters	16,177	4–4–3	11	Recap
12	October 28	Pittsburgh	3–1	Carolina		Peters	15,042	4–5–3	11	Recap

November: 6–6–2 (Home: 5–3–1; Road: 1–3–1)
#	Date	Visitor	Score	Home	OT	Decision	Attendance	Record	Pts	Recap
13	November 1	Tampa Bay	3–0	Carolina		Peters	14,828	4–6–3	11	Recap
14	November 2	Carolina	1–5	NY Rangers		Peters	18,006	4–7–3	11	Recap
15	November 5	Philadelphia	1–2	Carolina	OT	Peters	15,519	5–7–3	13	Recap
16	November 7	NY Islanders	0–1	Carolina		Peters	11,541	6–7–3	15	Recap
17	November 9	Minnesota	3–2	Carolina	SO	Peters	14,704	6–7–4	16	Recap
18	November 12	Colorado	1–2	Carolina		Peters	13,278	7–7–4	18	Recap
19	November 15	Anaheim	2–3	Carolina	SO	Peters	14,802	8–7–4	20	Recap
20	November 16	Carolina	2–4	St. Louis		Peters	17,936	8–8–4	20	Recap
21	November 18	Boston	4–1	Carolina		Ward	13,919	8–9–4	20	Recap
22	November 21	Carolina	3–4	Detroit		Peters	20,066	8–10–4	20	Recap
23	November 23	Carolina	2–3	Boston	OT	Ward	17,565	8–10–5	21	Recap
24	November 24	Ottawa	1–4	Carolina		Ward	13,657	9–10–5	23	Recap
25	November 27	Carolina	4–3	New Jersey		Ward	16,592	10–10–5	25	Recap
26	November 29	New Jersey	5–2	Carolina		Ward	15,034	10–11–5	25	Recap

December: 5–5–4 (Home: 2–3–1; Road: 3–2–3)
#	Date	Visitor	Score	Home	OT	Decision	Attendance	Record	Pts	Recap
27	December 1	Vancouver	3–2	Carolina		Ward	14,916	10–12–5	25	Recap
28	December 3	Carolina	4–1	Washington		Peters	18,506	11–12–5	27	Recap
29	December 5	Carolina	5–2	Nashville		Peters	15,768	12–12–5	29	Recap
30	December 6	San Jose	3–5	Carolina		Ward	14,553	13–12–5	31	Recap
31	December 9	Carolina	0–2	Vancouver		Peters	18,910	13–13–5	31	Recap
32	December 10	Carolina	4–5	Edmonton	OT	Ward	16,839	13–13–6	32	Recap
33	December 12	Carolina	1–2	Calgary	OT	Peters	19,289	13–13–7	33	Recap
34	December 14	Carolina	3–1	Phoenix		Peters	11,697	14–13–7	35	Recap
35	December 20	Washington	4–2	Carolina		Ward	17,737	14–14–7	35	Recap
36	December 21	Carolina	2–3	Tampa Bay	OT	Peters	19,204	14–14–8	36	Recap
37	December 23	Columbus	4–3	Carolina		Peters	16,601	14–15–8	36	Recap
38	December 27	Pittsburgh	4–3	Carolina	OT	Peters	18,124	14–15–9	37	Recap
39	December 29	Carolina	2–5	Toronto		Ward	19,452	14–16–9	37	Recap
40	December 31	Montreal	4–5	Carolina	OT	Ward	16,807	15–16–9	39	Recap

January: 10–4–0 (Home: 6–2–0; Road: 4–2–0)
#	Date	Visitor	Score	Home	OT	Decision	Attendance	Record	Pts	Recap
41	January 2	Carolina	4–3	Washington	OT	Khudobin	18,506	16–16–9	41	Recap
42	January 4	Carolina	3–2	NY Islanders		Khudobin	14,208	17–16–9	43	Recap
43	January 5	Nashville	1–2	Carolina		Khudobin	13,994	18–16–9	45	Recap
–	January 7	Carolina		Buffalo	Game rescheduled to February 25 due to hazardous weather in Buffalo.
44	January 9	Toronto	1–6	Carolina		Khudobin	16,583	19–16–9	47	Recap
45	January 10	Carolina	0–3	Columbus		Khudobin	16,008	19–17–9	47	Recap
46	January 13	Calgary	2–0	Carolina		Khudobin	15,276	19–18–9	47	Recap
47	January 18	Florida	2–3	Carolina		Khudobin	15,476	20–18–9	49	Recap
48	January 19	Tampa Bay	5–3	Carolina		Khudobin	16,760	20–19–9	49	Recap
–	January 21	Carolina		Philadelphia	Game postponed to January 22 due to a snowstorm in Philadelphia.
49	January 22	Carolina	3–2	Philadelphia		Khudobin	19,592	21–19–9	51	Recap
50	January 23	Carolina	5–3	Buffalo		Khudobin	18,468	22–19–9	53	Recap
–	January 24	Ottawa		Carolina	Game rescheduled to January 25 due to Hurricanes-Flyers game being postponed.
51	January 25	Ottawa	3–6	Carolina		Khudobin	11,458	23–19–9	55	Recap
52	January 27	Columbus	2–3	Carolina		Khudobin	13,641	24–19–9	57	Recap
53	January 28	Carolina	0–3	Montreal		Khudobin	21,273	24–20–9	57	Recap
54	January 31	St. Louis	1–3	Carolina		Khudobin	16,035	25–20–9	59	Recap

February: 1–4–0 (Home: 1–2–0; Road: 0–2–0)
#	Date	Visitor	Score	Home	OT	Decision	Attendance	Record	Pts	Recap
55	February 4	Winnipeg	2–1	Carolina		Khudobin	14,033	25–21–9	59	Recap
56	February 7	Florida	1–5	Carolina		Khudobin	16,132	26–21–9	61	Recap
57	February 8	Montreal	4–1	Carolina		Khudobin	18,680	26–22–9	61	Recap
58	February 25	Carolina	2–3	Buffalo		Ward	18,719	26–23–9	61	Recap
59	February 27	Carolina	1–4	Dallas		Khudobin	16,122	26–24–9	61	Recap

March: 6–8–2 (Home: 2–3–1; Road: 4–5–1)
#	Date	Visitor	Score	Home	OT	Decision	Attendance	Record	Pts	Recap
60	March 1	Carolina	1–3	Los Angeles		Khudobin	16,122	26–25–9	61	Recap
61	March 2	Carolina	3–5	Anaheim		Ward	17,174	26–26–9	61	Recap
62	March 4	Carolina	3–2	San Jose	OT	Khudobin	17,562	27–26–9	63	Recap
63	March 7	NY Rangers	4–2	Carolina		Khudobin	17,547	27–27–9	63	Recap
64	March 8	Carolina	4–5	New Jersey		Ward	16,162	27–28–9	63	Recap
65	March 11	NY Rangers	1–3	Carolina		Ward	15,667	28–28–9	65	Recap
66	March 13	Buffalo	2–4	Carolina		Ward	13,654	29–28–9	67	Recap
67	March 15	Carolina	1–5	Boston		Ward	17,565	29–29–9	67	Recap
68	March 16	Edmonton	2–1	Carolina		Khudobin	16,588	29–30–9	67	Recap
69	March 18	Carolina	3–1	Columbus		Khudobin	15,938	30–30–9	69	Recap
70	March 21	Carolina	2–3	Chicago		Khudobin	21,857	30–31–9	69	Recap
71	March 22	Carolina	3–2	Winnipeg		Ward	15,004	31–31–9	71	Recap
72	March 25	NY Islanders	5–4	Carolina		Khudobin	15,176	31–32–9	71	Recap
73	March 27	Carolina	3–0	Florida		Khudobin	12,379	32–32–9	73	Recap
74	March 29	Columbus	3–2	Carolina	OT	Khudobin	16,714	32–32–10	74	Recap
75	March 31	Carolina	1–2	Ottawa	SO	Ward	16,732	32–32–11	75	Recap

April: 4–3–0 (Home: 1–2–0; Road: 3–1–0)
#	Date	Visitor	Score	Home	OT	Decision	Attendance	Record	Pts	Recap
76	April 1	Carolina	4–1	Pittsburgh		Khudobin	18,635	33–32–11	77	Recap
77	April 3	Dallas	1–4	Carolina		Khudobin	15,730	34–32–11	79	Recap
78	April 5	New Jersey	3–1	Carolina		Khudobin	16,123	34–33–11	79	Recap
79	April 8	Carolina	1–4	NY Rangers		Ward	18,006	34–34–11	79	Recap
80	April 10	Washington	5–2	Carolina		Khudobin	15,735	34–35–11	79	Recap
81	April 11	Carolina	2–1	Detroit		Ward	20,066	35–35–11	81	Recap
82	April 13	Carolina	6–5	Philadelphia	SO	Khudobin	19,727	36–35–11	83	Recap

Legend: Win (2 points) Loss (0 points) Overtime/shootout loss (1 point)

== Player stats ==
Final stats

Skaters

Regular season
Player	GP	G	A	Pts	+/−	PIM
Eric Staal	79	21	40	61	−13	74
Jeff Skinner	71	33	21	54	−14	22
Andrej Sekera	74	11	33	44	4	20
Alexander Semin	65	22	20	42	1	42
Jordan Staal	82	15	25	40	2	34
Justin Faulk	76	5	27	32	−9	37
Nathan Gerbe	81	16	15	31	−6	36
Jiri Tlusty	68	16	14	30	2	22
Riley Nash	73	10	14	24	0	29
Patrick Dwyer	75	8	14	22	−2	14
Elias Lindholm	58	9	12	21	−14	4
Tuomo Ruutu^{‡}	57	5	11	16	−19	34
Ron Hainsey	82	4	11	15	−9	45
Jay Harrison	68	4	11	15	−1	44
Manny Malhotra	69	7	6	13	0	18
Drayson Bowman	70	4	8	12	−2	16
Ryan Murphy	48	2	10	12	−9	10
Andrei Loktionov^{†}	20	3	7	10	−4	2
Radek Dvorak	60	4	5	9	3	41
John-Michael Liles^{†}	35	2	7	9	7	8
Brett Bellemore	64	2	6	8	−1	45
Zach Boychuk	11	1	3	4	2	0
Mike Komisarek	32	0	4	4	−4	14
Brett Sutter	17	1	1	2	−4	9
Chris Terry	10	0	2	2	−4	0
Tim Gleason^{‡}	17	0	1	1	−7	10
Aaron Palushaj	2	0	0	0	−1	0
Kevin Westgarth^{‡}	12	0	0	0	−2	4

Goaltenders

Regular season
Player	GP	GS	TOI	W	L	OT	GA	GAA	SA	SV%	SO	G	A	PIM
Anton Khudobin	36	34	2,084:18	19	14	1	80	2.30	1076	0.926	1	0	0	0
Cam Ward	30	28	1,645:16	10	12	6	84	3.06	824	0.898	0	0	1	2
Justin Peters	21	20	1,225:20	7	9	4	51	2.50	626	0.919	1	0	2	4

^{†}Denotes player spent time with another team before joining the Hurricanes. Stats reflect time with the Hurricanes only.
^{‡}Denotes player was traded mid-season. Stats reflect time with the Hurricanes only.
Bold/italics denotes franchise record.

== Transactions ==
The Hurricanes have been involved in the following transactions during the 2013–14 season.

=== Trades ===
June 30, 2013	To Buffalo Sabres Jamie McBain; 2nd-round pick in 2013	To Carolina Hurricanes Andrej Sekera
September 29, 2013	To Vancouver Canucks Zac Dalpe; Jeremy Welsh	To Carolina Hurricanes Kellan Tochkin; 4th-round pick in 2014
December 30, 2013	To Calgary Flames Kevin Westgarth	To Carolina Hurricanes Greg Nemisz
January 1, 2014	To Toronto Maple Leafs Tim Gleason	To Carolina Hurricanes John-Michael Liles; Dennis Robertson
March 5, 2014	To New Jersey Devils Tuomo Ruutu	To Carolina Hurricanes Andrei Loktionov; Conditional 3rd-round pick in 2017

=== Free agents acquired ===
Player	Former team	Contract terms
Mike Komisarek	Toronto Maple Leafs	1 year, $700,000
Anton Khudobin	Boston Bruins	1 year, $800,000
Mark Flood	Lokomotiv Yaroslavl	1 year, $550,000
Matt Corrente	Albany Devils	1 year, $550,000
Aaron Palushaj	Colorado Avalanche	1 year, $600,000
Mike Murphy	Spartak Moscow	1 year, $550,000
Nathan Gerbe	Buffalo Sabres	1 year, $550,000
Sergey Tolchinsky	Sault Ste. Marie Greyhounds	3 years, $1.675 million entry-level contract
Ron Hainsey	Winnipeg Jets	1 year, $2 million
Radek Dvorak	Anaheim Ducks	1 year, $600,000
Manny Malhotra	Vancouver Canucks	1 year, $600,000
Patrick Brown	Boston College	2 years, $1.175 million entry-level contract

=== Free agents lost ===
Player	New team	Contract terms
Dan Ellis	Dallas Stars	2 years, $1.8 million
Joe Corvo	Ottawa Senators	1 year, $900,000
Marc-Andre Bergeron	ZSC Lions	3 years
Bobby Sanguinetti	Atlant Moscow Oblast	2 years

=== Claimed via waivers ===
Player	Previous team	Date

=== Lost via waivers ===
Player	New team	Date

=== Lost via retirement ===
Player	Date

=== Player signings ===
Player	Date	Contract terms
Riley Nash	July 9, 2013	2 years, $1.15 million
Michal Jordan	July 11, 2013	1 year, $550,000
Elias Lindholm	July 15, 2013	3 years, $2.4975 million entry-level contract
Jared Staal	July 16, 2013	1 year, $550,000
Zac Dalpe	July 19, 2013	1 year, $550,000
Zach Boychuk	August 20, 2013	1 year, $550,000
Trevor Carrick	December 18, 2013	3 years, $1.875 million entry-level contract
Daniel Altshuller	December 20, 2013	3 years, $2.025 million entry-level contract
Anton Khudobin	March 4, 2014	2 years, $4.5 million contract extension
Dennis Robertson	March 20, 2014	2 years, $1.125 million entry-level contract
Justin Faulk	March 24, 2014	6 years, $29 million contract extension
Phil Di Giuseppe	March 26, 2014	3 years, $2.175 million entry-level contract
Erik Karlsson	May 27, 2014	3 years, $1.8 million entry-level contract
Chris Terry	June 24, 2014	1 year, $600,000
Ron Hainsey	June 24, 2014	3 years, $8.5 million
Nathan Gerbe	June 24, 2014	2 years, $3.5 million

== Draft picks ==
Carolina Hurricanes' picks at the 2013 NHL entry draft, which was held in Newark, New Jersey, on June 30, 2013.

Round	#	Player	Pos	Nationality	College/Junior/Club team (League)
1	5	Elias Lindholm	Center	Sweden	Brynas IF (SHL)
3	66	Brett Pesce	Defense	United States	University of New Hampshire (Hockey East)
5	126	Brent Pedersen	Left wing	Canada	Kitchener Rangers (OHL)
6	156	Tyler Ganly	Defense	Canada	Sault Ste. Marie Greyhounds (OHL)

Draft notes

- The Carolina Hurricanes' second-round pick went to the Buffalo Sabres as the result of a June 30, 2013, trade that sent Andrej Sekera to the Hurricanes in exchange for Jamie McBain and this pick.
- The Carolina Hurricanes' fourth-round pick went to the Edmonton Oilers (via Los Angeles), the Hurricanes traded this pick to the Los Angeles Kings as the result of a January 13, 2013, trade that sent Kevin Westgarth to the Hurricanes in exchange for Anthony Stewart, 2014 sixth-round pick and this pick.
- The Carolina Hurricanes' seventh-round pick went to the Tampa Bay Lightning as the result of an April 2, 2013, trade that sent Marc-Andre Bergeron to the Hurricanes in exchange for Adam Hall and this pick.
