= 2013–14 New Jersey Devils season =

National Hockey League season

2013–14 New Jersey Devils
- Division: 6th Metropolitan
- Conference: 10th Eastern
- 2013–14 record: 35–29–18
- Home record: 21–11–9
- Road record: 14–18–9
- Goals for: 197
- Goals against: 208

Team information
- General manager: Lou Lamoriello
- Coach: Peter DeBoer
- Captain: Bryce Salvador
- Alternate captains: Patrik Elias; Andy Greene; Travis Zajac
- Arena: Prudential Center
- Average attendance: 15,208 (92.1%) (39 games)
- Minor league affiliate: Albany Devils (AHL)

Team leaders
- Goals: Adam Henrique (25)
- Assists: Jaromir Jagr (43)
- Points: Jaromir Jagr (67)
- Penalty minutes: Marek Zidlicky (60)
- Plus/minus: Jaromir Jagr (+16)
- Wins: Martin Brodeur (19)
- Goals against average: Cory Schneider (1.97)

The 2013–14 New Jersey Devils season was the 40th season for the National Hockey League (NHL) franchise that was established on June 11, 1974, and 32nd season since the franchise relocated from Colorado prior to the 1982–83 NHL season. For the second-straight season, the Devils failed to make the playoffs.

== Regular season ==
=== Stadium Series ===
The Devils played their cross-town rivals, the New York Rangers, at the 2014 NHL Stadium Series at Yankee Stadium in The Bronx, New York City, on January 26, 2014. This was the first stadium series game ever played in the NHL's history. It was also the first time that the Devils played an outdoor game. The Devils lost the game 7–3 after giving up a 3–2 lead in the first period.

== Standings ==
Metropolitan Division
Pos	Team	GP	W	L	OTL	ROW	GF	GA	GD	Pts
1	y – Pittsburgh Penguins	82	51	24	7	44	249	207	+42	109
2	x – New York Rangers	82	45	31	6	41	218	193	+25	96
3	x – Philadelphia Flyers	82	42	30	10	39	236	235	+1	94
4	x – Columbus Blue Jackets	82	43	32	7	38	231	216	+15	93
5	Washington Capitals	82	38	30	14	28	235	240	−5	90
6	New Jersey Devils	82	35	29	18	35	197	208	−11	88
7	Carolina Hurricanes	82	36	35	11	34	207	230	−23	83
8	New York Islanders	82	34	37	11	25	225	267	−42	79

Source: National Hockey League
x – Clinched playoff spot; y – Clinched division

Eastern Conference Wild Card
Pos	Div	Team	GP	W	L	OTL	ROW	GF	GA	GD	Pts
1	ME	x – Columbus Blue Jackets	82	43	32	7	38	231	216	+15	93
2	AT	x – Detroit Red Wings	82	39	28	15	34	222	230	−8	93
3	ME	Washington Capitals	82	38	30	14	28	235	240	−5	90
4	ME	New Jersey Devils	82	35	29	18	35	197	208	−11	88
5	AT	Ottawa Senators	82	37	31	14	30	236	265	−29	88
6	AT	Toronto Maple Leafs	82	38	36	8	29	231	256	−25	84
7	ME	Carolina Hurricanes	82	36	35	11	34	207	230	−23	83
8	ME	New York Islanders	82	34	37	11	25	225	267	−42	79
9	AT	Florida Panthers	82	29	45	8	21	196	268	−72	66
10	AT	Buffalo Sabres	82	21	51	10	14	157	248	−91	52

Source: National Hockey League
x – Clinched playoff spot

== Schedule and results ==
=== Pre-season ===
2013 preseason game log: 4–2–0 (Home: 2–1–0; Road: 2–1–0)
#	Date	Visitor	Score	Home	OT	Decision	Attendance	Record	Recap
1	September 16	NY Rangers	1–2	New Jersey		Kinkaid	11,906	1–0–0	Recap
2	September 19	NY Islanders	5–3	New Jersey		Brodeur	11,209	1–1–0	Recap
3^{[a]}	September 21	New Jersey	3–0	NY Islanders		Schneider	14,689	2–1–0	Recap
4	September 23	New Jersey	2–3	Montreal		Brodeur	21,273	2–2–0	Recap
5	September 24	New Jersey	2–1	Philadelphia		Schneider	19,360	3–2–0	Recap
6	September 26	Philadelphia	1–4	New Jersey		Schneider	11,789	4–2–0	Recap
Notes:^{a} Game was played at Barclays Center in Brooklyn, New York.

=== Regular season ===
2013–14 Game Log

October: 3–5–4 (Home: 2–0–2; Road: 1–5–2)
#	Date	Visitor	Score	Home	OT	Decision	Attendance	Record	Pts	Recap
1	October 3	New Jersey	0–3	Pittsburgh		Schneider	18,621	0–1–0	0	Recap
2	October 4	NY Islanders	4–3	New Jersey	SO	Brodeur	16,624	0–1–1	1	Recap
3	October 7	New Jersey	4–5	Edmonton	SO	Brodeur	16,839	0–1–2	2	Recap
4	October 8	New Jersey	2–3	Vancouver	OT	Schneider	18,910	0–1–3	3	Recap
5	October 11	New Jersey	2–3	Calgary		Brodeur	19,289	0–2–3	3	Recap
6	October 13	New Jersey	0–3	Winnipeg		Schneider	15,004	0–3–3	3	Recap
7	October 17	New Jersey	2–5	Ottawa		Brodeur	18,867	0–4–3	3	Recap
8	October 19	NY Rangers	0–4	New Jersey		Schneider	16,592	1–4–3	5	Recap
9	October 22	New Jersey	1–4	Columbus		Schneider	14,357	1–5–3	5	Recap
10	October 24	Vancouver	3–2	New Jersey	SO	Schneider	13,203	1–5–4	6	Recap
11	October 26	New Jersey	4–3	Boston		Brodeur	17,565	2–5–4	8	Recap
12	October 29	Tampa Bay	1–2	New Jersey		Brodeur	13,501	3–5–4	10	Recap

November: 8–6–1 (Home: 3–4–0; Road: 5–2–1)
#	Date	Visitor	Score	Home	OT	Decision	Attendance	Record	Pts	Recap
13	November 2	Philadelphia	1–0	New Jersey		Brodeur	13,705	3–6–4	10	Recap
14	November 3	New Jersey	0–4	Minnesota		Schneider	17,571	3–7–4	10	Recap
15	November 7	New Jersey	3–0	Philadelphia		Brodeur	19,604	4–7–4	12	Recap
16	November 8	New Jersey	1–2	Toronto	SO	Schneider	19,377	4–7–5	13	Recap
17	November 10	Nashville	0–5	New Jersey		Brodeur	12,964	5–7–5	15	Recap
18	November 12	New Jersey	3–2	NY Rangers		Brodeur	18,006	6–7–5	17	Recap
19	November 15	Los Angeles	2–0	New Jersey		Schneider	12,168	6–8–5	17	Recap
20	November 16	Pittsburgh	1–4	New Jersey		Brodeur	14,205	7–8–5	19	Recap
21	November 20	New Jersey	4–3	Anaheim	OT	Brodeur	14,306	8–8–5	21	Recap
22	November 21	New Jersey	2–1	Los Angeles	OT	Schneider	18,118	9–8–5	23	Recap
23	November 23	New Jersey	1–2	San Jose		Brodeur	17,562	9–9–5	23	Recap
24	November 25	Winnipeg	3–1	New Jersey		Brodeur	12,253	9–10–5	23	Recap
25	November 27	Carolina	4–3	New Jersey		Brodeur	16,592	9–11–5	23	Recap
26	November 29	New Jersey	5–2	Carolina		Schneider	15,034	10–11–5	25	Recap
27	November 30	Buffalo	0–1	New Jersey	OT	Schneider	15,226	11–11–5	27	Recap

December: 6–5–3 (Home: 3–1–3; Road: 3–4–0)
#	Date	Visitor	Score	Home	OT	Decision	Attendance	Record	Pts	Recap
28	December 2	New Jersey	2–3	Montreal		Brodeur	21,273	11–12–5	27	Recap
29	December 4	Montreal	4–3	New Jersey	SO	Schneider	12,742	11–12–6	28	Recap
30	December 6	Detroit	3–1	New Jersey		Schneider	13,223	11–13–6	28	Recap
31	December 7	New Jersey	4–3	NY Rangers	OT	Brodeur	18,006	12–13–6	30	Recap
32	December 10	New Jersey	4–5	Columbus		Brodeur	11,950	12–14–6	30	Recap
33	December 13	New Jersey	2–3	Pittsburgh		Schneider	18,582	12–15–6	30	Recap
34	December 14	Tampa Bay	0–3	New Jersey		Brodeur	13,832	13–15–6	32	Recap
35	December 18	Ottawa	2–5	New Jersey		Brodeur	14,032	14–15–6	34	Recap
36	December 20	Anaheim	3–2	New Jersey	OT	Schneider	15,723	14–15–7	35	Recap
37	December 21	New Jersey	5–4	Washington	OT	Brodeur	18,506	15–15–7	37	Recap
38	December 23	New Jersey	2–5	Chicago		Schneider	22,019	15–16–7	37	Recap
39	December 27	Columbus	2–1	New Jersey	SO	Brodeur	16,592	15–16–8	38	Recap
40	December 28	New Jersey	2–1	NY Islanders		Schneider	16,012	16–16–8	40	Recap
41	December 31	Pittsburgh	1–2	New Jersey		Brodeur	16,592	17–16–8	42	Recap

January: 6–5–4 (Home: 4–2–1; Road: 2–3–3)
#	Date	Visitor	Score	Home	OT	Decision	Attendance	Record	Pts	Recap
42	January 3	Chicago	5–3	New Jersey		Brodeur	16,592	17–17–8	42	Recap
43	January 4	New Jersey	1–2	Buffalo		Schneider	19,070	17–18–8	42	Recap
44	January 7	Philadelphia	3–2	New Jersey	OT	Brodeur	14,521	17–18–9	43	Recap
45	January 9	Dallas	0–1	New Jersey		Schneider	14,252	18–18–9	45	Recap
46	January 11	Florida	1–2	New Jersey	OT	Schneider	16,592	19–18–9	47	Recap
47	January 12	New Jersey	2–3	Toronto	SO	Schneider	19,175	19–18–10	48	Recap
48	January 14	New Jersey	4–1	Montreal		Brodeur	21,273	20–18–10	50	Recap
49	January 16	New Jersey	1–2	Colorado	SO	Schneider	14,090	20–18–11	51	Recap
50	January 18	New Jersey	2–3	Phoenix		Brodeur	14,005	20–19–11	51	Recap
51	January 21	St. Louis	1–7	New Jersey		Schneider	11,432	21–19–11	53	Recap
52	January 24	Washington	1–2	New Jersey		Schneider	15,742	22–19–11	55	Recap
53	January 26 (outdoor game)	NY Rangers	7–3	New Jersey		Brodeur	50,105 (at Yankee Stadium)	22–20–11	55	Recap
54	January 28	New Jersey	0–3	St. Louis		Schneider	16,099	22–21–11	55	Recap
55	January 30	New Jersey	3–2	Dallas	OT	Schneider	14,237	23–21–11	57	Recap
56	January 31	New Jersey	2–3	Nashville	OT	Schneider	17,207	23–21–12	58	Recap

February: 2–1–1 (Home: 2–0–1; Road: 0–1–0)
#	Date	Visitor	Score	Home	OT	Decision	Attendance	Record	Pts	Recap
57	February 3	Colorado	2–1	New Jersey	OT	Schneider	14,213	23–21–13	59	Recap
58	February 7	Edmonton	1–2	New Jersey	OT	Schneider	16,592	24–21–13	61	Recap
59	February 8	New Jersey	0–3	Washington		Schneider	18,506	24–22–13	61	Recap
60	February 27	Columbus	2–5	New Jersey		Schneider	15,185	25–22–13	63	Recap

March: 7–6–2 (Home: 5–3–1; Road: 2–4–1)
#	Date	Visitor	Score	Home	OT	Decision	Attendance	Record	Pts	Recap
61	March 1	New Jersey	6–1	NY Islanders		Brodeur	15,512	26–22–13	65	Recap
62	March 2	San Jose	4–2	New Jersey		Schneider	16,012	26–23–13	65	Recap
63	March 4	Detroit	3–4	New Jersey		Brodeur	16,592	27–23–13	67	Recap
64	March 7	New Jersey	4–7	Detroit		Schneider	20,066	27–24–13	67	Recap
65	March 8	Carolina	4–5	New Jersey		Brodeur	16,162	28–24–13	69	Recap
66	March 11	New Jersey	2–1	Philadelphia		Brodeur	19,967	29–24–13	71	Recap
67	March 14	New Jersey	3–5	Florida		Schneider	14,496	29–25–13	71	Recap
68	March 15	New Jersey	0–3	Tampa Bay		Brodeur	19,204	29–26–13	71	Recap
69	March 18	Boston	4–2	New Jersey		Brodeur	16,138	29–27–13	71	Recap
70	March 20	Minnesota	3–4	New Jersey	OT	Schneider	14,772	30–27–13	73	Recap
71	March 22	NY Rangers	2–0	New Jersey		Brodeur	17,829	30–28–13	73	Recap
72	March 23	Toronto	2–3	New Jersey		Schneider	15,328	31–28–13	75	Recap
73	March 27	Phoenix	3–2	New Jersey	SO	Brodeur	15,583	31–28–14	76	Recap
74	March 29	New Jersey	1–2	NY Islanders	SO	Schneider	15,108	31–28–15	77	Recap
75	March 31	Florida	3–6	New Jersey		Brodeur	15,209	32–28–15	79	Recap

April: 3–1–3 (Home: 2–1–1; Road: 1–0–2)
#	Date	Visitor	Score	Home	OT	Decision	Attendance	Record	Pts	Recap
76	April 1	New Jersey	2–3	Buffalo	SO	Schneider	19,070	32–28–16	80	Recap
77	April 4	Washington	1–2	New Jersey		Schneider	15,218	33–28–16	82	Recap
78	April 5	New Jersey	3–1	Carolina		Schneider	16,123	34–28–16	84	Recap
79	April 7	Calgary	1–0	New Jersey		Schneider	14,297	34–29–16	84	Recap
80	April 10	New Jersey	1–2	Ottawa	SO	Schneider	19,270	34–29–17	85	Recap
81	April 11	NY Islanders	3–2	New Jersey	SO	Brodeur	15,858	34–29–18	86	Recap
82	April 13	Boston	2–3	New Jersey		Brodeur	16,592	35–29–18	88	Recap

Legend: Win (2 points) Loss (0 points) Overtime/shootout loss (1 point)

== Media ==
This season was Chico Resch's final season as a television color commentator on MSG Plus. Former studio commentator Ken Daneyko would take his place the following season. Steve Cangialosi would remain as TV play-by-play announcer. Matt Loughlin and Sherry Ross did radio commenting as usual.

== Player statistics ==
Final stats

Skaters

Regular season
Player	GP	G	A	Pts	+/−	PIM
Jaromir Jagr	82	24	43	67	16	46
Patrik Elias	65	18	35	53	−4	30
Travis Zajac	80	18	30	48	3	28
Adam Henrique	77	25	18	43	3	20
Marek Zidlicky	81	12	30	42	−3	60
Michael Ryder	82	18	16	34	−6	18
Andy Greene	82	8	24	32	3	32
Eric Gelinas	60	7	22	29	−3	22
Dainius Zubrus	82	13	13	26	1	46
Ryane Clowe	43	7	19	26	−10	33
Damien Brunner	60	11	14	25	−11	26
Andrei Loktionov^{‡}	48	4	8	12	2	12
Steve Bernier	78	3	9	12	−15	33
Mark Fayne	72	4	7	11	−5	30
Stephen Gionta	66	4	7	11	−8	18
Jon Merrill	52	2	9	11	−3	12
Ryan Carter	62	7	3	10	−6	35
Tuomo Ruutu^{†}	19	3	5	8	1	10
Anton Volchenkov	56	0	8	8	3	20
Reid Boucher	23	2	5	7	2	4
Bryce Salvador	40	1	3	4	−2	29
Peter Harrold	33	0	4	4	−2	14
Cam Janssen	24	3	0	3	3	22
Jacob Josefson	27	1	2	3	0	4
Adam Larsson	26	1	2	3	−1	12
Tim Sestito	16	0	3	3	1	2
Rostislav Olesz^{‡}	10	0	2	2	−1	0
Mattias Tedenby	15	1	0	1	−8	10
Mike Sislo	14	0	0	0	−1	0
Joe Whitney	1	0	0	0	0	0

Goaltenders

Regular season
Player	GP	GS	TOI	W	L	OT	GA	GAA	SA	SV%	SO	G	A	PIM
Cory Schneider	45	43	2,679:54	16	15	12	88	1.97	1107	0.921	3	0	0	4
Martin Brodeur	39	39	2,296:49	19	14	6	96	2.51	971	0.901	3	0	3	2

^{†}Denotes player spent time with another team before joining the Devils. Stats reflect time with the Devils only.
^{‡}Denotes player was traded mid-season. Stats reflect time with the Devils only.
Bold/italics denotes franchise record.

== Transactions ==
The Devils have been involved in the following transactions during the 2013–14 season.

=== Trades ===
June 30, 2013	To Vancouver Canucks 1st-round pick in 2013	To New Jersey Devils Cory Schneider
June 30, 2013	To Phoenix Coyotes 2nd-round pick in 2013	To New Jersey Devils 2nd-round pick in 2013; 3rd-round pick in 2013
June 30, 2013	To Los Angeles Kings 7th-round pick in 2015	To New Jersey Devils 7th-round pick in 2013
July 7, 2013	To Buffalo Sabres Henrik Tallinder	To New Jersey Devils Riley Boychuk
September 28, 2013	To Florida Panthers Krys Barch; STL's 7th-round pick in 2015	To New Jersey Devils Scott Timmins; 6th-round pick in 2014
March 5, 2014	To Carolina Hurricanes Andrei Loktionov; Conditional 3rd-round pick in 2017	To New Jersey Devils Tuomo Ruutu

=== Free agents acquired ===
Player	Former team	Contract terms
Ryane Clowe	New York Rangers	5 years, $24.25 million
Rostislav Olesz	Chicago Blackhawks	1 year, $1 million
Michael Ryder	Montreal Canadiens	2 years, $7 million
Jaromir Jagr	Boston Bruins	1 year, $4 million
Damien Brunner	Detroit Red Wings	2 years, $5 million

=== Free agents lost ===
Player	New team	Contract terms
David Clarkson	Toronto Maple Leafs	7 years, $36.75 million
Matt D'Agostini	Pittsburgh Penguins	1 year, $550,000
Matt Corrente	Carolina Hurricanes	1 year, $550,000
Alexei Ponikarovsky	SKA St. Petersburg	undisclosed

=== Claimed via waivers ===
Player	Previous team	Date
Alexander Urbom	Washington Capitals	January 8, 2014

=== Lost via waivers ===
Player	New team	Date
Alexander Urbom	Washington Capitals	October 3, 2013

=== Lost via retirement ===
Player	Date
Ilya Kovalchuk	July 11, 2013
Steve Sullivan	Summer 2013

=== Player signings ===
Player	Date	Contract terms
Peter Harrold	July 1, 2013	2 years, $1.6 million
Patrik Elias	July 4, 2013	3 years, $16.5 million
Dainius Zubrus	July 4, 2013	3 years, $9.3 million
Tim Sestito	July 6, 2013	2 year, $1.125 million
Cam Janssen	July 9, 2013	1 year, $550,000
Marek Zidlicky	July 10, 2013	1 year, $4 million
Adam Henrique	August 26, 2013	6 years, $24 million
Graham Black	April 22, 2014	3 years, $1.95 million entry-level contract
Jaromir Jagr	April 30, 2014	1 year, $5.5 million
Ben Johnson	May 23, 2014	3 years, $1.85 million entry-level contract
Ben Thomson	May 23, 2014	3 years, $1.88 million entry-level contract
Marek Zidlicky	June 3, 2014	1 year, $3 million
Mike Sislo	June 19, 2014	2 years, $1.125 million
Cam Janssen	June 20, 2014	1 year, $575,000

== Draft picks ==
New Jersey Devils' picks at the 2013 NHL entry draft, which was held in Newark, New Jersey, on June 30, 2013.

Round	#	Player	Pos	Nationality	College/junior/club team (league)
2	42^{[a]}	Steven Santini	Defence	United States	USA U–18 (USHL)
3	73^{[b]}	Ryan Kujawinski	Center	Canada	Kingston Frontenacs (OHL)
4	100	Miles Wood	Left wing	United States	Noble High School (HIGH–MA)
6	160	Myles Bell	Left wing	Canada	Kelowna Rockets (WHL)
7	208^{[c]}	Anthony Brodeur	Goaltender	United States	Shattuck-Saint Mary's (HIGH–MN)

Draft notes

- The New Jersey Devils' first-round pick went to the Vancouver Canucks as the result of a June 30, 2013, trade that sent Cory Schneider to the Devils in exchange for this pick.
- The New Jersey Devils' second-round pick went to the Phoenix Coyotes as the result of a June 30, 2013, trade that sent a 2013 second-round pick (#42–Steve Santini) and a 2013 third-round pick (#73–Ryan Kujawinski) to the Devils in exchange for this pick.
- ^{a} The Phoenix Coyotes' second-round pick went to the New Jersey Devils as a result of a June 30, 2013, trade that sent a 2013 second-round pick (#39–Laurent Dauphin) to the Coyotes in exchange for a 2013 third-round pick (#73–Ryan Kujawinski) and this pick.
- The New Jersey Devils' third-round pick went to the Minnesota Wild as the result of a February 24, 2012, trade that sent Marek Zidlicky to the Devils in exchange for Kurtis Foster, Nick Palmieri, Stephane Veilleux, a 2012 second-round pick (#46–Raphael Bussier) and this pick.
- ^{b} The Phoenix Coyotes' third-round pick went to the New Jersey Devils as a result of a June 30, 2013, trade that sent a 2013 second-round pick (#39–Laurent Dauphin) to the Coyotes in exchange for a 2013 second-round pick (#42–Steve Santini) and this pick.
- The New Jersey Devils' fifth-round pick went to the Buffalo Sabres (via Los Angeles and Florida), New Jersey traded this pick to the Los Angeles Kings as the result of a February 6, 2013, trade that sent Andrei Loktionov to the Devils in exchange for this pick.
- The New Jersey Devils' seventh-round pick went to the Winnipeg Jets as the result of a February 13, 2013, trade that sent Alexei Ponikarovsky to the Devils in exchange for a 2014 fourth-round pick and this pick.
- ^{c} The Los Angeles Kings' seventh-round pick went to the New Jersey Devils as a result of a June 30, 2013, trade that sent a 2015 seventh-round pick to the Kings in exchange for this pick.
