= 2013–14 Columbus Blue Jackets season =

National Hockey League season

2013–14 Columbus Blue Jackets
- Division: 4th Metropolitan
- Conference: 7th Eastern
- 2013–14 record: 43–32–7
- Home record: 22–15–4
- Road record: 21–17–3
- Goals for: 231
- Goals against: 216

Team information
- General manager: Jarmo Kekäläinen
- Coach: Todd Richards
- Captain: Vacant
- Alternate captains: Jared Boll; Brandon Dubinsky; Jack Johnson; Mark Letestu
- Arena: Nationwide Arena
- Average attendance: 14,698 (88.5%) (41 games)
- Minor league affiliates: Springfield Falcons (AHL); Evansville IceMen (ECHL)

Team leaders
- Goals: Ryan Johansen (33)
- Assists: James Wisniewski (44)
- Points: Ryan Johansen (63)
- Penalty minutes: Brandon Dubinsky (98)
- Plus/minus: Corey Tropp (+11)
- Wins: Sergei Bobrovsky (32)
- Goals against average: Sergei Bobrovsky (2.38)

The 2013–14 Columbus Blue Jackets season was the 14th season for the National Hockey League (NHL) franchise that was established on June 25, 1997. Before the season, the team was moved into the Eastern Conference as a member of the Metropolitan Division. As a result of their move to the Metropolitan Division, the Blue Jackets became the fourth "Big 4" sports league team from Ohio to share a division with a team from Pittsburgh. The others are the Cincinnati Bengals and Cleveland Browns of the National Football League and the Cincinnati Reds of Major League Baseball - Ohio teams and Pittsburgh teams have generally been rivals over the years. The Blue Jackets also qualified for the playoffs, making it for the second time in their franchise's history.

== Standings ==
Metropolitan Division
Pos	Team	GP	W	L	OTL	ROW	GF	GA	GD	Pts
1	y – Pittsburgh Penguins	82	51	24	7	44	249	207	+42	109
2	x – New York Rangers	82	45	31	6	41	218	193	+25	96
3	x – Philadelphia Flyers	82	42	30	10	39	236	235	+1	94
4	x – Columbus Blue Jackets	82	43	32	7	38	231	216	+15	93
5	Washington Capitals	82	38	30	14	28	235	240	−5	90
6	New Jersey Devils	82	35	29	18	35	197	208	−11	88
7	Carolina Hurricanes	82	36	35	11	34	207	230	−23	83
8	New York Islanders	82	34	37	11	25	225	267	−42	79

Source: National Hockey League
x – Clinched playoff spot; y – Clinched division

Eastern Conference Wild Card
Pos	Div	Team	GP	W	L	OTL	ROW	GF	GA	GD	Pts
1	ME	x – Columbus Blue Jackets	82	43	32	7	38	231	216	+15	93
2	AT	x – Detroit Red Wings	82	39	28	15	34	222	230	−8	93
3	ME	Washington Capitals	82	38	30	14	28	235	240	−5	90
4	ME	New Jersey Devils	82	35	29	18	35	197	208	−11	88
5	AT	Ottawa Senators	82	37	31	14	30	236	265	−29	88
6	AT	Toronto Maple Leafs	82	38	36	8	29	231	256	−25	84
7	ME	Carolina Hurricanes	82	36	35	11	34	207	230	−23	83
8	ME	New York Islanders	82	34	37	11	25	225	267	−42	79
9	AT	Florida Panthers	82	29	45	8	21	196	268	−72	66
10	AT	Buffalo Sabres	82	21	51	10	14	157	248	−91	52

Source: National Hockey League
x – Clinched playoff spot

== Schedule and results ==
=== Pre-season ===
2013 Pre-Season game log: 4–3–1 (home: 1–2–1; road: 3–1–0)
#	Date	Visitor	Score	Home	OT	Decision	Attendance	Record	Recap
1	September 15	Pittsburgh	4–5	Columbus	OT	Dansk	12,035	1–0–0	Recap
2	September 17	Buffalo	3–1	Columbus		Bobrovsky	9,009	1–1–0	Recap
3	September 17	Columbus	3–1	Minnesota		Smith	17,784	2–1–0	Recap
4	September 18	Columbus	5–4	Carolina		McKenna	8,178	3–1–0	Recap
5	September 21	Columbus	5–3	Pittsburgh		Bobrovsky	18,004	4–1–0	Recap
6	September 23	Minnesota	2–1	Columbus	SO	Bobrovsky	10,089	4–1–1	Recap
7	September 25	Columbus	0–3	Buffalo		McKenna	17,346	4–2–1	Recap
8	September 26	Carolina	2–1	Columbus		Bobrovsky	10,899	4–3–1	Recap

=== Regular season ===
2013–14 game log

October: 5–6–0 (home: 3–3–0; road: 2–3–0)
#	Date	Visitor	Score	Home	OT	Decision	Attendance	Record	Pts	Recap
1	October 4	Calgary	4–3	Columbus		Bobrovsky	18,151	0–1–0	0	Recap
2	October 5	Columbus	3–2	NY Islanders	SO	Bobrovsky	16,170	1–1–0	2	Recap
3	October 10	Columbus	4–1	Buffalo		Bobrovsky	18,210	2–1–0	4	Recap
4	October 12	Boston	3–1	Columbus		Bobrovsky	14,092	2–2–0	4	Recap
5	October 15	Columbus	1–2	Detroit		Bobrovsky	20,066	2–3–0	4	Recap
6	October 17	Columbus	3–5	Montreal		Bobrovsky	21,273	2–4–0	4	Recap
7	October 19	Columbus	1–4	Washington		Bobrovsky	18,506	2–5–0	4	Recap
8	October 20	Vancouver	1–3	Columbus		McElhinney	14,168	3–5–0	6	Recap
9	October 22	New Jersey	1–4	Columbus		Bobrovsky	14,357	4–5–0	8	Recap
10	October 25	Toronto	2–5	Columbus		Bobrovsky	13,930	5–5–0	10	Recap
11	October 27	Anaheim	4–3	Columbus		Bobrovsky	10,542	5–6–0	10	Recap

November: 5–8–3 (home: 2–4–1; road: 3–4–2)
#	Date	Visitor	Score	Home	OT	Decision	Attendance	Record	Pts	Recap
12	November 1	Columbus	2–4	Pittsburgh		Bobrovsky	18,620	5–7–0	10	Recap
13	November 2	Pittsburgh	3–0	Columbus		McElhinney	18,634	5–8–0	10	Recap
14	November 5	Ottawa	4–1	Columbus		McElhinney	13,122	5–9–0	10	Recap
15	November 7	NY Rangers	4–2	Columbus		Bobrovsky	11,746	5–10–0	10	Recap
16	November 9	NY Islanders	2–5	Columbus		Bobrovsky	13,949	6–10–0	12	Recap
17	November 12	Columbus	3–4	Washington	OT	Bobrovsky	18,506	6–10–1	13	Recap
18	November 14	Columbus	2–3	Boston	OT	Bobrovsky	17,565	6–10–2	14	Recap
19	November 15	Montreal	3–2	Columbus	SO	McElhinney	11,562	6–10–3	15	Recap
20	November 17	Columbus	4–1	Ottawa		Bobrovsky	15,535	7–10–3	17	Recap
21	November 19	Columbus	0–7	Edmonton		Bobrovsky	16,839	7–11–3	17	Recap
22	November 20	Columbus	2–1	Calgary	OT	Bobrovsky	19,289	8–11–3	19	Recap
23	November 22	Columbus	2–6	Vancouver		Bobrovsky	18,910	8–12–3	19	Recap
24	November 25	Columbus	6–0	Toronto		Bobrovsky	19,241	9–12–3	21	Recap
25	November 27	Nashville	4–0	Columbus		Bobrovsky	11,893	9–13–3	21	Recap
26	November 29	Edmonton	2–4	Columbus		Bobrovsky	14,360	10–13–3	23	Recap
27	November 30	Columbus	1–3	Boston		McElhinney	17,565	10–14–3	23	Recap

December: 7–5–1 (home: 4–2–1; road: 3–3–0)
#	Date	Visitor	Score	Home	OT	Decision	Attendance	Record	Pts	Recap
28	December 3	Tampa Bay	0–1	Columbus		Bobrovsky	10,223	11–14–3	25	Recap
29	December 6	Minnesota	0–4	Columbus		McElhinney	11,319	12–14–3	27	Recap
30	December 9	Columbus	1–2	Pittsburgh		McElhinney	18,520	12–15–3	27	Recap
31	December 10	New Jersey	4–5	Columbus		McElhinney	11,950	13–15–3	29	Recap
32	December 12	Columbus	4–2	NY Rangers		McElhinney	18,006	14–15–3	31	Recap
33	December 14	St. Louis	4–3	Columbus	OT	McKenna	13,801	14–15–4	32	Recap
34	December 16	Winnipeg	3–2	Columbus		McKenna	11,448	14–16–4	32	Recap
35	December 19	Columbus	4–5	Philadelphia		McElhinney	19,852	14–17–4	32	Recap
36	December 21	Philadelphia	3–6	Columbus		McElhinney	14,090	15–17–4	34	Recap
37	December 23	Columbus	4–3	Carolina		McKenna	16,601	16–17–4	36	Recap
38	December 27	Columbus	2–1	New Jersey	SO	McElhinney	16,592	17–17–4	38	Recap
39	December 29	Pittsburgh	5–3	Columbus		McElhinney	18,871	17–18–4	38	Recap
40	December 31	Columbus	3–5	Colorado		McElhinney	16,177	17–19–4	38	Recap

January: 10–4–0 (home: 6–2–0; road: 4–2–0)
#	Date	Visitor	Score	Home	OT	Decision	Attendance	Record	Pts	Recap
41	January 2	Columbus	2–0	Phoenix		McElhinney	10,539	18–19–4	40	Recap
42	January 4	Columbus	2–6	St. Louis		McElhinney	19,611	18–20–4	40	Recap
43	January 6	Columbus	4–3	NY Rangers	SO	Bobrovsky	18,006	19–20–4	42	Recap
44	January 10	Carolina	0–3	Columbus		Bobrovsky	16,008	20–20–4	44	Recap
45	January 11	Columbus	6–3	Winnipeg		McElhinney	15,004	21–20–4	46	Recap
46	January 13	Tampa Bay	2–3	Columbus		Bobrovsky	14,070	22–20–4	48	Recap
47	January 17	Washington	1–5	Columbus		Bobrovsky	14,121	23–20–4	50	Recap
48	January 18	Columbus	4–3	Buffalo	SO	Bobrovsky	19,070	24–20–4	52	Recap
49	January 21	Los Angeles	3–5	Columbus		Bobrovsky	13,286	25–20–4	54	Recap
50	January 23	Philadelphia	2–5	Columbus		Bobrovsky	15,571	26–20–4	56	Recap
51	January 25	Buffalo	5–2	Columbus		Bobrovsky	16,272	26–21–4	56	Recap
52	January 27	Columbus	2–3	Carolina		Bobrovsky	13,641	26–22–4	56	Recap
53	January 28	Ottawa	3–2	Columbus		McElhinney	13,373	26–23–4	56	Recap
54	January 30	Washington	2–5	Columbus		Bobrovsky	16,047	27–23–4	58	Recap

February: 2–2–1 (home: 1–0–0; road: 1–2–1)
#	Date	Visitor	Score	Home	OT	Decision	Attendance	Record	Pts	Recap
55	February 1	Florida	1–4	Columbus		Bobrovsky	16,762	28–23–4	60	Recap
56	February 3	Columbus	4–2	Anaheim		Bobrovsky	14,044	29–23–4	62	Recap
57	February 6	Columbus	1–2	Los Angeles	OT	Bobrovsky	18,118	29–23–5	63	Recap
58	February 7	Columbus	2–3	San Jose		Bobrovsky	17,562	29–24–5	63	Recap
59	February 27	Columbus	2–5	New Jersey		Bobrovsky	15,185	29–25–5	63	Recap

March: 9–5–1 (home: 4–3–1; road: 5–2–0)
#	Date	Visitor	Score	Home	OT	Decision	Attendance	Record	Pts	Recap
60	March 1	Florida	3–6	Columbus		Bobrovsky	16,762	30–25–5	65	Recap
61	March 3	Columbus	2–1	Toronto		Bobrovsky	19,577	31–25–5	67	Recap
62	March 4	Dallas	2–4	Columbus		Bobrovsky	15,661	32–25–5	69	Recap
63	March 6	Columbus	1–6	Chicago		Bobrovsky	21,179	32–26–5	69	Recap
64	March 8	Columbus	1–0	Nashville		Bobrovsky	17,113	33–26–5	71	Recap
–	March 10	Columbus		Dallas	Game rescheduled to April 9. See note. (Note: Six minutes into the Blue Jackets vs. Stars game on March 10, Stars forward Rich Peverley collapsed on the Dallas bench due to a cardiac incident. Shortly afterwards, the two teams decided to postpone the game, due to the emotional effects Peverley's collapse had on players and coaches of both teams. At the time of postponement, the Blue Jackets held a 1–0 lead due to a goal by Nathan Horton, with assists from Matt Calvert and James Wisniewski. The NHL later decided that the game should be replayed on April 9 in its entirety (full 60 minutes of regulation, plus any time, if necessary, for overtime or shootout). However, Columbus will be allowed to start the game with the 1–0 lead it had at the time of the original game's postponement. All statistics from the March 10 game will be expunged from NHL records, except for Horton's goal and its assists.)
65	March 11	Detroit	1–4	Columbus		Bobrovsky	14,330	34–26–5	73	Recap
66	March 13	San Jose	4–3	Columbus	SO	Bobrovsky	13,851	34–26–6	74	Recap
67	March 15	Columbus	2–1	Minnesota	SO	Bobrovsky	19,042	35–26–6	76	Recap
68	March 18	Carolina	3–1	Columbus		Bobrovsky	15,938	35–27–6	76	Recap
69	March 20	Columbus	3–2	Montreal		Bobrovsky	21,273	36–27–6	78	Recap
70	March 21	NY Rangers	3–1	Columbus		Bobrovsky	18,513	36–28–6	78	Recap
71	March 23	Columbus	0–2	NY Islanders		Bobrovsky	15,008	36–29–6	78	Recap
72	March 25	Detroit	2–4	Columbus		McElhinney	15,103	37–29–6	80	Recap
73	March 28	Pittsburgh	2–1	Columbus		McElhinney	18,908	37–30–6	80	Recap
74	March 29	Columbus	3–2	Carolina	OT	McElhinney	16,174	38–30–6	82	Recap

April: 5–2–1 (home: 2–1–1; road: 3–1–0)
#	Date	Visitor	Score	Home	OT	Decision	Attendance	Record	Pts	Recap
75	April 1	Colorado	3–2	Columbus	OT	Bobrovsky	16,550	38–30–7	83	Recap
76	April 3	Columbus	2–0	Philadelphia		Bobrovsky	19,981	39–30–7	85	Recap
77	April 4	Chicago	4–3	Columbus		Bobrovsky	18,695	39–31–7	85	Recap
78	April 6	NY Islanders	0–4	Columbus		Bobrovsky	15,667	40–31–7	87	Recap
79	April 8	Phoenix	3–4	Columbus	OT	Bobrovsky	16,289	41–31–7	89	Recap
80	April 9	Columbus	3–1	Dallas		Bobrovsky	16,125	42–31–7	91	Recap
81	April 11	Columbus	2–3	Tampa Bay		McElhinney	18,686	42–32–7	91	Recap
82	April 12	Columbus	3–2	Florida		Bobrovsky	14,241	43–32–7	93	Recap

Legend: Win (2 points) Loss (0 points) Overtime/shootout loss (1 point)

== Playoffs ==
The Columbus Blue Jackets entered the playoffs as the Eastern Conference's first wild card. They faced the Pittsburgh Penguins in the first round. This marked the second time the Blue Jackets qualified for the playoffs, and given that they were swept out of the playoffs by the Detroit Red Wings in 2009, their victory in game 2 was the franchise's first playoff win.

2014 Stanley Cup playoffs

Eastern Conference first round vs. (M1) Pittsburgh Penguins: Pittsburgh won series 4–2
#	Date	Visitor	Score	Home	OT	Decision	Attendance	Series	Recap
1	April 16	Columbus	3–4	Pittsburgh		Bobrovsky	18,646	0–1	Recap
2	April 19	Columbus	4–3	Pittsburgh	2OT	Bobrovsky	18,619	1–1	Recap
3	April 21	Pittsburgh	4–3	Columbus		Bobrovsky	18,144	1–2	Recap
4	April 23	Pittsburgh	3–4	Columbus	OT	Bobrovsky	18,144	2–2	Recap
5	April 26	Columbus	1–3	Pittsburgh		Bobrovsky	18,618	2–3	Recap
6	April 28	Pittsburgh	4–3	Columbus		Bobrovsky	19,189	2–4	Recap

Legend: Win Loss

== Player stats ==
Final stats

Skaters

Regular season
Player	GP	G	A	Pts	+/−	PIM
Ryan Johansen	82	33	30	63	3	43
James Wisniewski	75	7	44	51	0	61
Brandon Dubinsky	76	16	34	50	5	98
Cam Atkinson	79	21	19	40	−4	18
Artem Anisimov	81	22	17	39	−2	20
Nick Foligno	70	18	21	39	5	96
R. J. Umberger	74	18	16	34	−3	26
Mark Letestu	82	12	22	34	1	20
Jack Johnson	82	5	28	33	−7	48
Boone Jenner	72	16	13	29	6	45
Fedor Tyutin	69	4	22	26	6	44
Matt Calvert	56	9	15	24	−1	53
Ryan Murray	66	4	17	21	4	10
Nathan Horton	36	5	14	19	−3	24
Derek MacKenzie	71	9	9	18	0	47
Blake Comeau	61	5	11	16	−2	36
David Savard	70	5	10	15	2	28
Nikita Nikitin	66	2	13	15	9	20
Marian Gaborik^{‡}	18	5	7	12	2	6
Corey Tropp^{†}	44	2	8	10	11	37
Dalton Prout	49	2	4	6	−7	37
Jack Skille	16	4	0	4	2	6
Jared Boll	28	1	1	2	−6	62
Nick Schultz^{†}	9	0	1	1	−2	4
Matt Frattin^{†}	4	0	1	1	2	0
Sean Collins	6	0	1	1	1	0
Michael Chaput	17	0	1	1	0	2
Ryan Craig	6	0	0	0	−3	0
Cody Bass	1	0	0	0	0	5
Cody Goloubef	5	0	0	0	0	2
Tim Erixon	2	0	0	0	2	2

Playoffs
Player	GP	G	A	Pts	+/−	PIM
Jack Johnson	6	3	4	7	−1	4
Ryan Johansen	6	2	4	6	−2	4
Brandon Dubinsky	6	1	5	6	−1	6
Boone Jenner	6	3	2	5	−4	4
Matt Calvert	6	2	2	4	2	4
David Savard	6	0	4	4	2	4
Artem Anisimov	6	1	2	3	−2	4
Cam Atkinson	6	1	2	3	1	0
Nick Foligno	4	2	0	2	0	4
Fedor Tyutin	4	1	1	2	0	4
Mark Letestu	6	1	1	2	−2	0
James Wisniewski	6	0	2	2	−7	10
Derek MacKenzie	6	1	0	1	−1	2
R. J. Umberger	4	0	1	1	−2	2
Jack Skille	6	0	1	1	−2	0
Ryan Murray	5	0	1	1	−1	0
Nick Schultz	2	0	0	0	−1	0
Blake Comeau	6	0	0	0	−2	10
Nikita Nikitin	5	0	0	0	0	0
Jared Boll	2	0	0	0	0	0
Corey Tropp	2	0	0	0	0	0
Dalton Prout	2	0	0	0	0	2

Goaltenders

Regular season
Player	GP	GS	TOI	W	L	OT	GA	GAA	SA	SV%	SO	G	A	PIM
Sergei Bobrovsky	58	58	3299	32	20	5	131	2.38	1699	0.923	5	0	1	2
Curtis McElhinney	28	21	1423	10	11	1	64	2.70	703	0.909	2	0	1	0
Mike McKenna	4	3	219	1	1	1	11	3.01	114	0.904	0	0	0	0

Playoffs
Player	GP	GS	TOI	W	L	GA	GAA	SA	SV%	SO	G	A	PIM
Sergei Bobrovsky	6	6	378	2	4	20	3.17	218	.908	0	0	0	0

^{†}Denotes player spent time with another team before joining the Blue Jackets. Stats reflect time with the Blue Jackets only.
^{‡}Denotes player was traded mid-season. Stats reflect time with the Blue Jackets only.
Bold/italics denotes franchise record.

== Transactions ==
The Blue Jackets have been involved in the following transactions during the 2013–14 season.

=== Trades ===
June 30, 2013	To Pittsburgh Penguins 2nd-round pick in 2013	To Columbus Blue Jackets SJS's 2nd-round pick in 2013; 3rd-round pick in 2013
July 2, 2013	To Tampa Bay Lightning Drew Olson (rights)	To Columbus Blue Jackets Future Considerations
February 6, 2014	To Pittsburgh Penguins Spencer Machacek	To Columbus Blue Jackets Paul Thompson
February 7, 2014	To Boston Bruins Blake Parlett	To Columbus Blue Jackets Carter Camper
March 5, 2014	To Los Angeles Kings Marian Gaborik	To Columbus Blue Jackets Matt Frattin; 2nd round pick in 2014 (LAK's ) or 2015 (TOR's) conditional 3rd round pick in 2014 (EDM's) or 2015 (LAK's)
March 5, 2014	To Edmonton Oilers 5th-round pick in 2014	To Columbus Blue Jackets Nick Schultz
March 5, 2014	To Tampa Bay Lightning Jonathan Marchessault; Dalton Smith	To Columbus Blue Jackets Matt Taormina; Dana Tyrell
June 23, 2014	To Philadelphia Flyers R. J. Umberger; 4th-round pick in 2015	To Columbus Blue Jackets Scott Hartnell
June 25, 2014	To Edmonton Oilers Nikita Nikitin	To Columbus Blue Jackets CBJ's 5th-round pick in 2014

=== Free agents acquired ===
Player	Former team	Contract terms
Nathan Horton	Boston Bruins	7 years, $37.1 million
Jeremy Smith	Nashville Predators	1 year, $550,000
Ryan Craig	Springfield Falcons	2 years, $1.2 million
Mike McKenna	Peoria Rivermen	1 year, $595,000
Patrick McNeill	Hershey Bears	1 year, $600,000
Jack Skille	Florida Panthers	1 year, $675,000
Frederic St. Denis	Hamilton Bulldogs	1 year, $575,000
Simon Hjalmarsson	Linkopings HC	1 year, $925,000 entry-level contract

=== Free agents lost ===
Player	New team	Contract terms
Nick Holden	Colorado Avalanche	2 years, $1.2 million
Nick Drazenovic	Pittsburgh Penguins	1 year, $550,000
Michael Leighton	HC Donbass (KHL)	1 year

=== Claimed via waivers ===
Player	Previous team	Date
Corey Tropp	Buffalo Sabres	November 28, 2013

=== Lost via waivers ===
Player	New team	Date

=== Lost via retirement ===
Player	Date

=== Player signings ===
Player	Date	Contract terms
Sergei Bobrovsky	July 1, 2013	2 years, $11.25 million
Blake Comeau	July 2, 2013	1 year, $1 million
Cody Bass	July 5, 2013	1 year, $600,000
Thomas Larkin	July 5, 2013	2 years, $1.2 million entry-level contract
David Savard	July 15, 2013	1 year, $709,275
Spencer Machacek	July 19, 2013	1 year, $632,500
Blake Parlett	July 19, 2013	1 year, $577,500
Cody Goloubef	July 25, 2013	1 year, $826,875
Jared Boll	September 13, 2013	3 years, $5.1 million contract extension
Josh Anderson	November 5, 2013	3 years, $2.1275 million entry-level contract
Oliver Bjorkstrand	December 26, 2013	3 years, $2.1275 million entry-level contract
Kerby Rychel	December 31, 2013	3 years, $3.825 million entry-level contract
Joonas Korpisalo	March 21, 2014	3 years, $2.2275 million entry-level contract
T. J. Tynan	April 1, 2014	2 years, $1.435 million entry-level contract
Oscar Dansk	May 8, 2014	3 years, $2.775 million entry-level contract
Alexander Wennberg	May 16, 2014	3 years, $4.2 million entry-level contract
Daniel Zaar	May 30, 2014	3 years, $1.995 million entry-level contract
Curtis McElhinney	June 23, 2014	1 year, $600,000 contract extension

== Draft picks ==
Columbus Blue Jackets' picks at the 2013 NHL entry draft, which was held in Newark, New Jersey on June 30, 2013.

Round	#	Player	Pos	Nationality	College/Junior/Club team (League)
1	14	Alexander Wennberg	Center	Sweden	Djurgardens IF (Sweden)
1	19^{[a]}	Kerby Rychel	Left wing	Canada	Windsor Spitfires (OHL)
1	27^{[b]}	Marko Dano	Center	Slovakia	Slovan Bratislava (KHL)
2	50^{[c]}	Dillon Heatherington	Defence	Canada	Swift Current Broncos (WHL)
3	89^{[d]}	Oliver Bjorkstrand	Right wing	Denmark	Portland Winterhawks (WHL)
4	105	Nick Moutrey	Center/Left Wing	Canada	Saginaw Spirit (OHL)
6	165	Markus Soberg	Right wing	Norway	Frolunda HC (Sweden-Jr)
7	195	Peter Quenneville	Center/Right Wing	Canada	Dubuque Fighting Saints (USHL)

Draft notes

- ^{a} The New York Rangers' first-round pick went to the Columbus Blue Jackets as a result of a July 23, 2012, trade that sent Rick Nash, Steven Delisle and a 2013 conditional third-round pick to the Rangers in exchange for Artem Anisimov, Brandon Dubinsky, Tim Erixon and this pick.
- ^{b} The Los Angeles Kings' first-round pick went to the Columbus Blue Jackets as a result of a February 23, 2012, trade that sent Jeff Carter to the Kings in exchange for Jack Johnson and this pick.
- The Columbus Blue Jackets' second-round pick went to the Pittsburgh Penguins as the result of a trade on June 30, 2013, that sent San Jose's second-round pick in 2013 (50th overall) and a third-round pick in 2013 (89th overall) to Columbus in exchange for this pick.
- ^{c} The San Jose Sharks' second-round pick went to the Columbus Blue Jackets as the result of a trade on June 30, 2013, that sent a second-round pick in 2013 (44th overall) to Pittsburgh in exchange for a third-round pick in 2013 (89th overall) and this pick. Pittsburgh previously acquired this pick as the result of a trade on June 30, 2013, that sent Tyler Kennedy to San Jose in exchange for this pick.
- The Columbus Blue Jackets' third-round pick went to the New York Rangers as the result of a July 23, 2012, trade that sent Artem Anisimov, Brandon Dubinsky, Tim Erixon and a 2013 first-round pick to the Blue Jackets in exchange for Rick Nash, Steven Delisle and this pick.
- ^{d} The Pittsburgh Penguins' third-round pick went to the Columbus Blue Jackets as the result of a trade on June 30, 2013, that sent a second-round pick in 2013 (44th overall) to Pittsburgh in exchange for San Jose's second-round pick in 2013 (50th overall) and this pick.
- The Columbus Blue Jackets' fifth-round pick went to the Calgary Flames as the result of an April 3, 2013, trade that sent Blake Comeau to the Blue Jackets in exchange for this pick.
