= Radek Martínek =

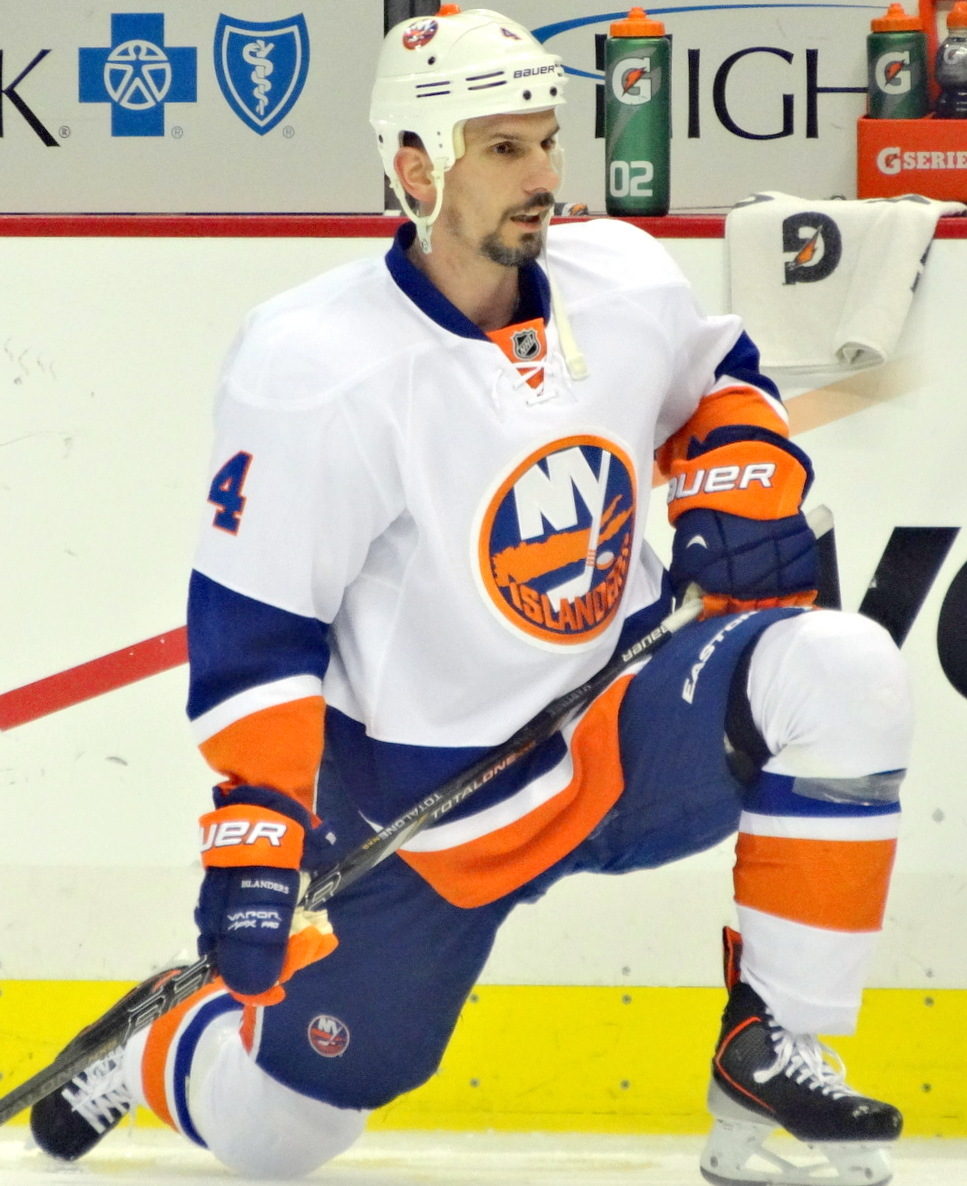
- Martínek with the Islanders during the 2013 playoffs
- Born: August 31, 1976 (age 49) Havlíčkův Brod, Czechoslovakia
- Height: 6 ft 0 in (183 cm)
- Weight: 206 lb (93 kg; 14 st 10 lb)
- Position: Defence
- Shot: Right
- Played for: HC České Budějovice; New York Islanders; Columbus Blue Jackets
- National team: Czech Republic
- NHL draft: 228th overall, 1999; New York Islanders
- Playing career: 1995–2014

Radek Martínek (born August 31, 1976) is a Czech former professional ice hockey defenceman who last played for the New York Islanders in the National Hockey League (NHL).

== Playing career ==
Martínek was an eighth-round selection, 228th overall, by the New York Islanders in the 1999 NHL entry draft. After playing professionally for five seasons in his native Czech Extraliga with HC České Budějovice, he joined the Islanders in 2001 and entrenched himself as a mainstay on the blueline. With the exception of Rick DiPietro, Martínek had the longest tenure with the Islanders of any current player(At the time) until he was signed as a free agent by the Columbus Blue Jackets on July 6, 2011.

Martínek opened the 2011–12 season with the Blue Jackets, scoring one goal in seven games before he suffered a season-ending concussion against the Detroit Red Wings on October 21, 2011 and also lost teeth and broke his leg.

In returning to health and as a free agent with the NHL lockout in effect, Martínek signed as he did during the previous lockout with his Czech team, České Budějovice, on September 19, 2012. He appeared in only four games with the club before he left to return to North America. With an agreement in place to end the labour dispute, Martínek was signed to a one-year deal with his former team, the New York Islanders, to add depth and compete for the final defensive spot on January 13, 2013.

Martínek won a gold medal at the 2001 World Championships as a member of the Czech national team. He was also member of Czech team on 2011 World Championships (Bronze medal). Has two kids named Veronika Martinkova and Anna Martinkova and a wife Jana Martinkova.

== Career statistics ==
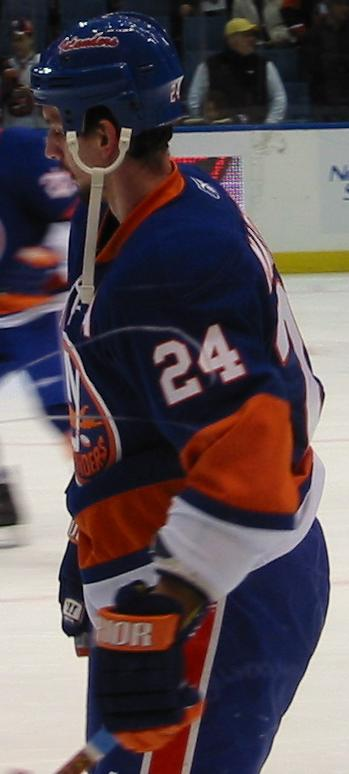
Martínek playing for the Islanders

=== Regular season and playoffs ===
			Regular season					Playoffs
Season	Team	League	GP	G	A	Pts	PIM	GP	G	A	Pts	PIM
1995–96	BK Havlíčkův Brod	CZE.2	37	3	6	9	14	—	—	—	—	—
1996–97	HC České Budějovice	ELH	51	3	4	7	40	5	0	1	1	2
1997–98	HC České Budějovice	ELH	42	2	7	9	36	—	—	—	—	—
1998–99	HC České Budějovice	ELH	50	11	12	23	50	3	0	2	2	0
1999–2000	HC České Budějovice	ELH	45	5	18	23	24	3	0	0	0	6
2000–01	HC České Budějovice	ELH	44	8	10	18	45	—	—	—	—	—
2001–02	New York Islanders	NHL	23	1	4	5	15	—	—	—	—	—
2002–03	Bridgeport Sound Tigers	AHL	3	0	3	3	2	—	—	—	—	—
2002–03	New York Islanders	NHL	66	2	11	13	26	4	0	0	0	4
2003–04	New York Islanders	NHL	47	4	3	7	43	5	0	1	1	0
2004–05	HC České Budějovice	CZE.2	30	12	18	30	80	12	2	3	5	6
2005–06	New York Islanders	NHL	74	1	16	17	32	—	—	—	—	—
2006–07	New York Islanders	NHL	43	2	15	17	40	—	—	—	—	—
2007–08	New York Islanders	NHL	69	0	15	15	40	—	—	—	—	—
2008–09	New York Islanders	NHL	51	6	4	10	28	—	—	—	—	—
2009–10	New York Islanders	NHL	16	2	1	3	12	—	—	—	—	—
2010–11	New York Islanders	NHL	64	3	13	16	35	—	—	—	—	—
2011–12	Columbus Blue Jackets	NHL	7	1	0	1	0	—	—	—	—	—
2012–13	HC České Budějovice	ELH	4	0	2	2	0	—	—	—	—	—
2012–13	New York Islanders	NHL	13	3	0	3	4	2	0	0	0	2
2013–14	New York Islanders	NHL	13	0	3	3	4	—	—	—	—	—
ELH totals			236	29	53	82	195	11	0	3	3	8
NHL totals			486	25	85	110	280	11	0	1	1	6

=== International ===
Medal record

Representing Czech Republic

Ice hockey

World Championships
Gold medal – first place	2000 Saint Petersburg	
Gold medal – first place	2001 Nuremberg	
Bronze medal – third place	2011 Bratislava	

Year	Team	Event	Result	GP	G	A	Pts	PIM
2000	Czech Republic	WC	1st place, gold medalist(s)	9	0	0	0	4
2001	Czech Republic	WC	1st place, gold medalist(s)	9	0	2	2	8
2011	Czech Republic	WC	3rd place, bronze medalist(s)	1	0	0	0	0
Senior totals				19	0	2	2	12
