= Metropolitan Division =

National Hockey League division

- Conference: Eastern Conference
- League: National Hockey League
- Sport: Ice hockey
- Founded: 2013; Suspended in 2020–21; 2021 (reactivated)
- No. of teams: 8
- Most recent champion: Carolina Hurricanes (3rd title) (2025–26)
- Most titles: Washington Capitals (6 titles)

Metropolitan Division teams location

The National Hockey League's Metropolitan Division (often referred to simply as the "Metro Division") was formed in 2013 as one of the two divisions in the Eastern Conference as part of a league realignment. It is also a successor of the original Atlantic Division and one of the two successors to the Southeast Division. Six of its teams were previously together in the Patrick Division from 1981 to 1993 (one joined in 1982). It is the only NHL division without a Canadian team, with five of the division's clubs located in either the New York City area or in Pennsylvania and the other three in North Carolina, Ohio, and Washington, D.C.

The Metropolitan Division contains some of the most historic and heated rivalries in the NHL, including Flyers–Penguins, Devils–Rangers, Capitals–Penguins, Islanders–Rangers, Capitals–Rangers, Capitals–Islanders, Flyers–Rangers, Capitals–Flyers, and Devils–Flyers. Three of its teams (Rangers, Islanders, and Devils) are within the league's largest market (New York), the Flyers are in the fifth largest market (Philadelphia), and the Capitals are in the eighth largest (Washington, D.C.). Games involving Metropolitan Division teams are frequently shown on U.S. national television.

== Division lineups ==
=== 2013–2020 ===
- Carolina Hurricanes
- Columbus Blue Jackets
- New Jersey Devils
- New York Islanders
- New York Rangers
- Philadelphia Flyers
- Pittsburgh Penguins
- Washington Capitals
Metropolitan Division teams since 2013

==== Changes from the 2012–13 season ====
- The Metropolitan Division is formed due to NHL realignment
- The Northeast and Southeast Divisions are dissolved due to NHL realignment
- The New Jersey Devils, New York Islanders, New York Rangers, Philadelphia Flyers, and Pittsburgh Penguins come from the original Atlantic Division
- The Carolina Hurricanes and Washington Capitals come from the Southeast Division
- The Columbus Blue Jackets come from the Central Division

=== 2020–2021 ===
- Division not used for the 2020–21 NHL season

==== Changes from the 2019–20 season ====
- Due to COVID-19 restrictions the NHL realigned into four divisions with no conferences for the 2020–21 season
- The Carolina Hurricanes and Columbus Blue Jackets move to the Central Division
- The New Jersey Devils, New York Islanders, New York Rangers, Philadelphia Flyers, Pittsburgh Penguins and Washington Capitals move to the East Division

=== 2021–present ===
- Carolina Hurricanes
- Columbus Blue Jackets
- New Jersey Devils
- New York Islanders
- New York Rangers
- Philadelphia Flyers
- Pittsburgh Penguins
- Washington Capitals

==== Changes from the 2020–21 season ====
- The league returned to using a four division and two conference alignment
- The Carolina Hurricanes and Columbus Blue Jackets come from the Central Division
- The New Jersey Devils, New York Islanders, New York Rangers, Philadelphia Flyers, Pittsburgh Penguins and Washington Capitals come from the East Division

== Season results ==
^{(#)}	Denotes team that won the Stanley Cup
^{(#)}	Denotes team that won the Prince of Wales Trophy, but lost Stanley Cup Final
^{(#)}	Denotes team that qualified for the Stanley Cup playoffs
‡	Denotes winner of the Presidents' Trophy

Season	1st	2nd	3rd	4th	5th	6th	7th	8th
2013–14	^{(1)} Pittsburgh (109)	^{(2)} NY Rangers (96)	^{(3)} Philadelphia (94)	^{(WC1)} Columbus (93)	Washington (90)	New Jersey (88)	Carolina (83)	NY Islanders (79)
2014–15	^{(1)} NY Rangers (113)^{‡}	^{(2)} Washington (101)	^{(3)} NY Islanders (101)	^{(WC2)} Pittsburgh (98)	Columbus (89)	Philadelphia (84)	New Jersey (78)	Carolina (71)
2015–16	^{(1)} Washington (120)^{‡}	^{(2)} Pittsburgh (104)	^{(3)} NY Rangers (101)	^{(WC1)} NY Islanders (100)	^{(WC2)} Philadelphia (96)	Carolina (86)	New Jersey (84)	Columbus (76)
2016–17	^{(1)} Washington (118)^{‡}	^{(2)} Pittsburgh (111)	^{(3)} Columbus (108)	^{(WC1)} NY Rangers (102)	NY Islanders (94)	Philadelphia (88)	Carolina (87)	New Jersey (70)
2017–18	^{(1)} Washington (105)	^{(2)} Pittsburgh (100)	^{(3)} Philadelphia (98)	^{(WC1)} Columbus (97)	^{(WC2)} New Jersey (97)	Carolina (83)	NY Islanders (80)	NY Rangers (77)
2018–19	^{(1)} Washington (104)	^{(2)} NY Islanders (103)	^{(3)} Pittsburgh (100)	^{(WC1)} Carolina (99)	^{(WC2)} Columbus (98)	Philadelphia (82)	NY Rangers (78)	New Jersey (72)
2019–20^{[a]}	^{(3)} Washington (69 gp 90 pts..652 ppct.)	^{(4)} Philadelphia (69 gp 89 pts..645 ppct.)	^{(5)} Pittsburgh (69 gp 86 pts..623 ppct.)	^{(6)} Carolina (68 gp 81 pts..596 ppct.)	^{(7)} NY Islanders (68 gp 80 pts..588 ppct.)	^{(9)} Columbus (70 gp 81 pts..579 ppct.)	^{(11)} NY Rangers (70 gp 79 pts..564 ppct.)	New Jersey (69 gp 68 pts..493 ppct.)
2020–21	Division suspended for season; temporary realignment							
2021–22	^{(1)} Carolina (116)	^{(2)} NY Rangers (110)	^{(3)} Pittsburgh (103)	^{(WC2)} Washington (100)	NY Islanders (84)	Columbus (81)	New Jersey (63)	Philadelphia (61)
2022–23	^{(1)} Carolina (113)	^{(2)} New Jersey (112)	^{(3)} NY Rangers (107)	^{(WC1)} NY Islanders (93)	Pittsburgh (91)	Washington (80)	Philadelphia (75)	Columbus (59)
2023–24	^{(1)} NY Rangers (114)^{‡}	^{(2)} Carolina (111)	^{(3)} NY Islanders (94)	^{(WC2)} Washington (91)	Pittsburgh (88)	Philadelphia (87)	New Jersey (81)	Columbus (66)
2024–25	^{(1)} Washington (111)	^{(2)} Carolina (99)	^{(3)} New Jersey (91)	Columbus (89)	NY Rangers (85)	NY Islanders (82)	Pittsburgh (80)	Philadelphia (76)
2025–26	^{(1)} Carolina (113)	^{(2)} Pittsburgh (98)	^{(3)} Philadelphia (98)	Washington (95)	Columbus (92)	NY Islanders (91)	New Jersey (87)	NY Rangers (77)

Notes

- ^{a} The 2019–20 NHL season was cut short due to the COVID-19 pandemic. Due to the imbalance in the number of games played among teams, the regular season standings were determined by points percentage.

== Metropolitan Division titles won by team ==
Teams in bold are currently in the division.

Team	Wins	Last win
Washington Capitals	6	2025
Carolina Hurricanes	3	2026
New York Rangers	2	2024
Pittsburgh Penguins	1	2014
Columbus Blue Jackets	0	—
New Jersey Devils	0	—
New York Islanders	0	—
Philadelphia Flyers	0	—
