= Jesper Fast =

Swedish ice hockey player (born 1991)

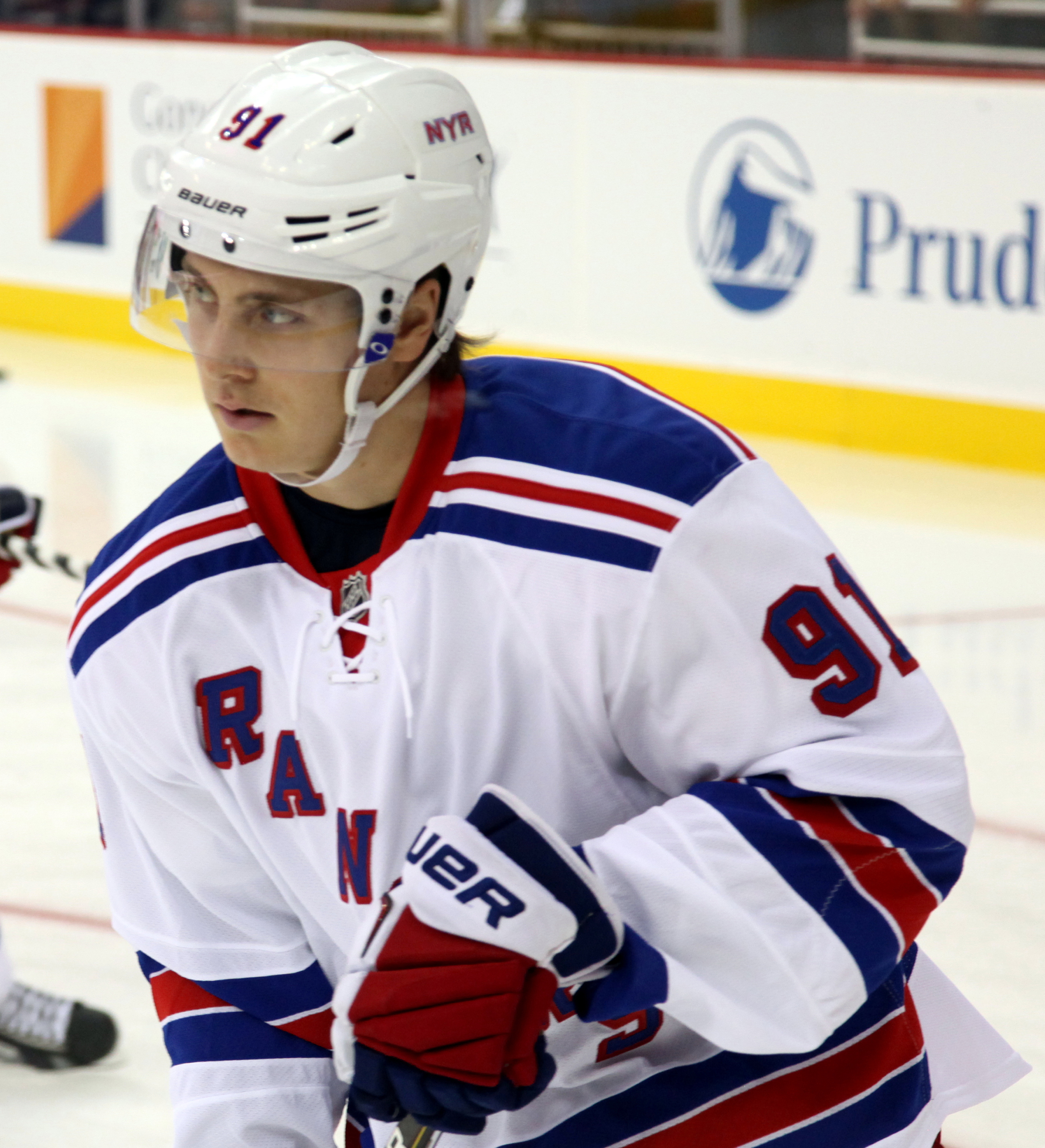
- Fast with the New York Rangers in 2014
- Born: 2 December 1991 (age 34) Nässjö, Sweden
- Height: 6 ft 0 in (183 cm)
- Weight: 185 lb (84 kg; 13 st 3 lb)
- Position: Right wing
- Shot: Right
- Played for: HV71; New York Rangers; Carolina Hurricanes
- National team: Sweden
- NHL draft: 157th overall, 2010; New York Rangers
- Playing career: 2009–2024

Jesper Fast (born 2 December 1991) is a Swedish former professional ice hockey right winger. Fast was drafted by the New York Rangers in the sixth round (157th overall) of the 2010 NHL entry draft and joined the Rangers organization in 2013.

A Nässjö native, Fast started his career with two seasons in the J20 SuperElit junior hockey league, leading his team in goals in his final season. He started his first extended season with the Swedish Hockey League in 2010 and spent three full seasons with the HV71, tying for the team lead in goals in 2012–13 and earning the Rinkens riddare for most sportsmanlike player.

Internationally, Fast played for Sweden at the 2011 World Junior Championships.

== Playing career ==
=== Junior career ===
A native of Nässjö, Sweden, Jesper Fast was born on 2 December 1991. He changed his last name to "Fast" in 2012. Fast began his hockey career with the HV71 U18 team in Sweden's J20 SuperElit junior hockey league. He debuted in the 2007–08 season, tallying 26 points (15 goals, 11 assists) in 30 games. The next season, as a 16-year-old, Fast played in 37 regular season games and seven playoff matches for HV71's U20 team. He scored 17 points (9 goals, 8 assists) and had 24 penalty minutes, including two goals, one assist and eight penalty minutes in the postseason. In 2009–10, Fast recorded 49 points (23 goals, 26 assists), the highest he had scored in all three categories during his SuperElit league career. He led the team in goals and placing second in points and third in assists. He tied for fifth in the overall league for regular season points, and also had two assists in three playoff games.

Fast also made his Swedish Hockey League debut in 2009–10, playing in two games with HV71, although he failed to record a point in either match. He returned to the SuperElit league for the start of the 2010–11 season, scoring 10 points (three goals, seven assists) in six games with the HV71 U20 team, before permanently joining the Swedish Hockey League.

=== Swedish Hockey League ===
At age 18, playing in a limited role for HV71 during the 2010–11 season, Fast scored 16 points (7 goals, 9 assists) in 36 games, with a +6 plus-minus, 6 penalty minutes and two power play goals, exceeded most observers' expectations. Fast credited playing alongside Johan Davidsson as part of the reason for his success and growth in confidence. He was held scoreless with a -3 plus-minute in three postseason games as the first-place HV71 was swept from the first round of the playoffs by Allmänna Idrottsklubben (AIK) in an upset. In the 2011–12 season, Fast had three multi-point games, including a career-high four assists and five points against AIK on 4 October. That game started a streak of 10 points (one goal, nine assists) over six games, which continued to an 20 October match against Frölunda HC. However, Fast's season was cut short after he suffered a fractured ankle during a 29 November game against Brynäs IF. He missed three months as a result, but nevertheless recorded 16 points (five goals, 11 assists) in 21 games for the season, matching his Swedish Hockey League career high in points and establishing new career highs in assists and plus-minus (+9). He also scored two goals and one assist in five postseason games.

In December 2011, Fast signed a two-year contract extension with HV71, which included a 900 percent raise to 5 million krona annually. Fast had a strong start to his 2012–13 season, scoring six points (four goals, two assists) in the first 10 games. He finished the regular season with 35 points (18 goals, 17 assists) in 47 games, exceeding the 32 points (12 goals, 10 assists) he had scored in 57 games during his first two Swedish Hockey League seasons. Fast tied for HV71's lead in goals and ranked third on the team in points, behind Jason Krog (43) and Rhett Rakhshani (39). Fast also had a career-high +13 plus-minus. Despite ranking third in the league, HV71 was eliminated from the playoffs in five games against Linköpings HC, during which Fast recorded five points (1 goal, 4 assists), and a +4 plus-minus. He tied with Rakhshani for second on the team in postseason points and assists.

At the conclusion of the 2012–13 season, Fast was awarded the Rinkens riddare (Knight of the Rink) award, which is bestowed by the Swedish hockey journalists' association each season to the most sportsmanlike player. He was also voted favorite HV71 player of the year by readers of the Swedish publication Jnytt.

=== New York Rangers ===
Fast was drafted by the New York Rangers in the sixth round (157th overall) of the 2010 NHL entry draft, having obtained the sixth round pick from the Carolina Hurricanes earlier in the day in exchange for defenseman Bobby Sanguinetti. Fast was the fifth of six players the Rangers drafted in 2010, along with Dylan McIlrath, Christian Thomas, Andrew Yogan, Jason Wilson and Randy McNaught. On 29 May 2012, the Rangers announced Fast had been signed to a two-way, three-year entry-level contract, valued at $2.145 million, with a $900,000 annual cap hit. Since HV71 was eliminated from the 2012–13 playoffs earlier than expected, Fast had the opportunity to go to the New York Rangers organization sooner than originally planned. The Swedish Hockey League initially voiced objections, but eventually agreed to loan him to the Rangers.

Fast practiced with New York for the first time on 2 April 2013, although he did not play with the team that season. When the media asked about the Rangers organization's plan for Fast, head coach John Tortorella replied: "There isn't one." He made his North American professional debut on 5 April 2013, with the Connecticut Whale, the Rangers' American Hockey League minor league affiliate, during which he scored a power play goal in the Whale's 4–3 victory, and was the Third Star of the Game. However, he injured his knee during the match and did not play another AHL game that season.

Fast participated in the Rangers' training camp that preceded the 2013–14 season, during which he impressed New York's head coach Alain Vigneault, and head European scout Anders Hedberg. Although it was his first North American professional training camp, Fast made the Rangers roster, partially because the team needed a right-handed shot to replace the injured captain Ryan Callahan. Fast made his NHL debut on 3 October against the Phoenix Coyotes, taking one shot on goal in 10:13 of ice time. Fast played in eight of the Rangers' first 10 games of the season, playing on the fourth line and recording no points and a -5 plus-minus, before returning to the AHL to make room for Carl Hagelin's return from a shoulder injury. Observers said Fast needed to adjust to the smaller North American ice surface, and did not get sufficient minutes to do so quickly enough to remain in the NHL.

Fast recorded two assists during his 30 October debut with the Rangers AHL team, now called the Hartford Wolf Pack. However, he suffered a high ankle sprain after going into the boards during a November 2 game at Springfield. He missed the next 14 games as a result, not returning until 20 December, but was given enough minutes upon his return that he was quickly able to get back into shape. Fast scored his first goal of the season on 26 December notching the game winner on the power play against Bridgeport Sound Tigers goalie Anders Nilsson. The game was part of a four-game point streak (two goals, two assists) that stretched from 21 December to 29 December. Fast also set a team record on 24 January 2014 for fastest goal to start a period, scoring in the first seven seconds of the game against Springfield, beating Hartford's previous record by two seconds.

Fast had a season-high five-game point streak from 24 January to 31 January, recording six goals and two assists. That included his first North American professional multi-goal game on 25 January, in which he scored two goals against the Falcons. Fast followed that the next day with a second straight two-goal game, this time against the Adirondack Phantoms. Fast had another two-goal game, both on the power play, against the Phantoms on 22 March, which marked the start of a run of seven points (four goals, three assists) in seven games up to 6 April. Fast marked a North American single-game career high with three points (2 goals, 1 assist) in Hartford's 3–2 win over the Norfolk Admirals on 6 April, earning him First Star of the Game. Fast recorded a total of 34 points (17 goals, 17 assists) in 48 games for the 2013–14 Hartford season, along with 30 penalty minutes and a +14 plus-minus. Despite missing time from his injury, Fast ranked seventh on the team in assists, fourth in goals, and second in plus-minus with +14. His eight power play goals led the team and tied eighth place in the league among AHL rookies, and his six game-winning goals tied for first in Hartford and fourth in the overall league. Fast was a staple on the Wolf Pack's penalty kill unit, and played most of the season on a line with J. T. Miller and Ryan Bourque.

Fast was called up to the Rangers in April 2014 to replace Chris Kreider, who suffered a left hand injury. Playing on a line with Hagelin and Brad Richards, Fast played in New York's last three regular season games, as well as three post-season matches. He recorded his first career NHL playoff point with an assist in Game 1 of the Metropolitan Division Semifinal against the Philadelphia Flyers on 17 April. At the conclusion of the season, the Rangers coaching staff told Fast to add strength, so he worked on his upper body and leg strength during the off-season, adding 10 to 15 pounds of muscle, bringing him to 20 pounds heavier than when he was drafted in 2010.

Fast scored three goals during the Rangers' 2014 preseason, including a game-tying goal in a 22 September loss to the New Jersey Devils, and two goals in a 6–3 victory over Philadelphia on 28 September. For the second consecutive year, he made the Rangers roster out of training camp, with Vigneault calling him one of the most consistent players throughout the camp. But he again struggled once the regular season began, and on 17 October was sent back to the Hartford Wolf Pack, along with J. T. Miller. Fast had nine points (one goal, eight assists) over the next 11 matches for Hartford, including two 2-assist games on 24 October and 8 November, notching his sole goal in a 4–3 win over the Worcester Sharks on 2 November. He was recalled by the Rangers on 10 November.

Fast scored his first NHL regular season career point on 23 November with an assist on Dominic Moore's goal against the Montreal Canadiens. He scored his first NHL goal on 29 November, three days before his 23rd birthday, against Ray Emery of the Philadelphia Flyers. Miller, his long-time AHL teammate, assisted on the goal, and Fast assisted on a Miller goal that same game. Fast recorded his second goal in as many games on 1 December, scoring against Ben Bishop of the Tampa Bay Lightning. Fast had played most of the season on the fourth line, often with Moore and Tanner Glass, or with Hagelin and Kevin Hayes, and had been an occasional healthy scratch.

Fast finished the regular season with 14 points (six goals, eight assists) in 58 games, and had been promoted to a top six forward role by the playoffs, playing on the second line with Kreider and Derek Stepan. Vigneault praised him as "a real smart, hard-working player". Fast scored one goal and three assists in the seven-game playoff series against the Washington Capitals, and he scored twice in Game 3 against the Tampa Bay Lightning in the Eastern Conference Finals, the only points he earned in that series. It marked Fast's first career multi-goal game, making him the first Rangers rookie to score multiple goals in a game since Brandon Dubinsky in 2008, and the first with a multi-goal playoff game on the road since Mike Ridley in 1986.

After the conclusion of the 2019–20 season, having played in his seventh season with the Rangers, Fast left the club as a free agent.

=== Carolina Hurricanes ===
On 11 October 2020, Fast joined his second NHL club, agreeing to a three-year, $6 million contract with the Carolina Hurricanes. On 11 May 2023, Fast scored the overtime and series winning goal against the New Jersey Devils in Game 5 of the Eastern Conference Semifinals.

On 1 July 2023, Fast signed a two-year, $4.8 million contract extension with the Hurricanes.

On 29 August 2024, it was announced that Fast would miss the entirety of the 2024–25 season after undergoing neck surgery.

On 2 June 2025, Fast announced his retirement from hockey.

== International play ==
In 2009–10, Fast skated in ten international matches for Sweden at the U18 and U19 levels, but did not participate in the World Junior Ice Hockey Championship tournament. He scored one goal and one assist in four games for Sweden at the U20 USA National Junior Evaluation Camp in Lake Placid, New York. At age 18, Fast represented Sweden in the 2011 IIHF World U20 Championship, where he tied the team lead with four goals in six tournament matches, also recording two assists and a +4 plus-minus. Sweden took fourth place in the tournament. In 2011–12, Fast represented Sweden in the Karjala Cup portion of the European Trophy tournament in October. He scored two assists in three games, which tied the Swedish team lead in scoring, and tied eighth scoring for the overall tournament.

== Coaching career ==
On August 20, 2025, Fast was hired to serve as a development coach for the Carolina Hurricanes.

== Personal life ==
Fast is the cousin of fellow hockey players Adam and Anton Bengtsson, who play in the Swedish Hockey League. Adam has said Fast was "supernaturally good" at hockey as a youth and he was not surprised by his future success. Fast also enjoys playing golf. Fast's teammates have given him the nicknames "Quickie" and "Fasty".

== Career statistics ==
=== Regular season and playoffs ===
			Regular season					Playoffs
Season	Team	League	GP	G	A	Pts	PIM	GP	G	A	Pts	PIM
2007–08	HV71	J18	16	8	4	12	4	—	—	—	—	—
2007–08	HV71	J18 Allsv	14	7	7	14	10	—	—	—	—	—
2007–08	HV71	J20	3	0	0	0	2	—	—	—	—	—
2008–09	HV71	J18	2	2	2	4	0	—	—	—	—	—
2008–09	HV71	J18 Allsv	1	0	0	0	2	—	—	—	—	—
2008–09	HV71	J20	37	7	7	14	16	7	2	1	3	6
2008–09	Nässjö HC	Div.2	1	3	0	3	2	—	—	—	—	—
2009–10	HV71	J20	37	23	26	49	10	3	0	2	2	0
2009–10	HV71	SEL	2	0	0	0	0	—	—	—	—	—
2010–11	HV71	J20	6	3	7	10	4	3	2	2	4	2
2010–11	HV71	SEL	36	7	9	16	6	3	0	0	0	0
2011–12	HV71	SEL	21	5	11	16	4	5	2	1	3	0
2012–13	HV71	SEL	47	18	17	35	4	—	—	—	—	—
2012–13	Connecticut Whale	AHL	1	1	0	1	2	—	—	—	—	—
2013–14	New York Rangers	NHL	11	0	0	0	2	3	0	1	1	0
2013–14	Hartford Wolf Pack	AHL	48	17	17	34	30	—	—	—	—	—
2014–15	Hartford Wolf Pack	AHL	11	1	8	9	2	—	—	—	—	—
2014–15	New York Rangers	NHL	58	6	8	14	8	19	3	3	6	2
2015–16	New York Rangers	NHL	79	10	20	30	18	5	0	1	1	0
2016–17	New York Rangers	NHL	68	6	15	21	16	12	3	3	6	0
2017–18	New York Rangers	NHL	71	13	20	33	26	—	—	—	—	—
2018–19	New York Rangers	NHL	66	8	12	20	26	—	—	—	—	—
2019–20	New York Rangers	NHL	69	12	17	29	20	1	0	0	0	0
2020–21	Carolina Hurricanes	NHL	46	6	13	19	14	11	1	2	3	0
2021–22	Carolina Hurricanes	NHL	82	14	20	34	4	14	1	0	1	0
2022–23	Carolina Hurricanes	NHL	80	10	19	29	16	15	6	3	9	2
2023–24	Carolina Hurricanes	NHL	73	6	13	19	16	—	—	—	—	—
SHL totals			106	30	37	67	14	8	2	1	3	0
NHL totals			703	91	157	248	166	80	14	13	27	4

=== International ===
Year	Team	Event	Result	GP	G	A	Pts	PIM
2011	Sweden	WJC	4th	6	4	2	6	0
Junior totals				6	4	2	6	0

== Awards ==
Award	Year
TV-Pucken Gold Medal	2007–08
J20 SM Silver Medal	2008–09
Rinkens riddare (Knight of the Rink)	2012–13
