= 2013–14 Los Angeles Kings season =

NHL team season; 2014 Stanley Cup Champions

2013–14 Los Angeles Kings
- Stanley Cup champions
- Western Conference champions
- Division: 3rd Pacific
- Conference: 6th Western
- 2013–14 record: 46–28–8
- Home record: 23–14–4
- Road record: 23–14–4
- Goals for: 206
- Goals against: 174

Team information
- General manager: Dean Lombardi
- Coach: Darryl Sutter
- Captain: Dustin Brown
- Alternate captains: Matt Greene; Anze Kopitar; Mike Richards (Nov.–Feb.)
- Arena: Staples Center
- Average attendance: 19,017 (100.2%) (41 games)
- Minor league affiliates: Manchester Monarchs (AHL); Ontario Reign (ECHL)

Team leaders
- Goals: Anze Kopitar (29)
- Assists: Anze Kopitar (41)
- Points: Anze Kopitar (70)
- Penalty minutes: Kyle Clifford (81)
- Plus/minus: Anze Kopitar (+34)
- Wins: Jonathan Quick (27)
- Goals against average: Martin Jones (1.81)

The 2013–14 Los Angeles Kings season was the 47th season (46th season of play) for the National Hockey League (NHL) franchise that was established on June 5, 1967. The Kings would eventually advance to the 2014 Stanley Cup Final, where they defeated the New York Rangers in five games to win their second Stanley Cup in franchise history. As of 2026, this was the last time the Kings won a playoff series.

== Standings ==
Pacific Division
Pos	Team	GP	W	L	OTL	ROW	GF	GA	GD	Pts
1	y – Anaheim Ducks	82	54	20	8	51	266	209	+57	116
2	x – San Jose Sharks	82	51	22	9	41	249	200	+49	111
3	x – Los Angeles Kings	82	46	28	8	38	206	174	+32	100
4	Phoenix Coyotes	82	37	30	15	31	216	231	−15	89
5	Vancouver Canucks	82	36	35	11	31	196	223	−27	83
6	Calgary Flames	82	35	40	7	28	209	241	−32	77
7	Edmonton Oilers	82	29	44	9	25	203	270	−67	67

Source: National Hockey League
x – Clinched playoff spot; y – Clinched division

== Schedule and results ==
=== Pre-season ===
2013 pre-season game log: 3–3–1 (Home: 2–2–0; Road: 1–1–1)
#	Date	Visitor	Score	Home	OT	Decision	Attendance	Record	Recap
1	September 15	Los Angeles	2–4	Phoenix		Scrivens	6,270	0–1–0	Recap
2	September 15	Phoenix	5–1	Los Angeles		Garon	12,988	0–2–0	Recap
3	September 17	Los Angeles	6–0	Anaheim		Quick	13,115	1–2–0	Recap
4	September 20	Los Angeles	3–4	Colorado	OT	Jones		1–2–1	Recap
5	September 24	Anaheim	1–2	Los Angeles		Quick	15,179	2–2–1	Recap
6^{[a]}	September 27	NY Rangers	1–4	Los Angeles		Quick	11,410	3–2–1	Recap
7^{[a]}	September 28	Colorado	3–2	Los Angeles		Garon	11,722	3–3–1	Recap
Notes:^{a} Games were played at MGM Grand Garden Arena in Paradise, Nevada.

=== Regular season ===
2013–14 game log

October: 9–5–0 (Home: 5–2–0; Road: 4–3–0)
#	Date	Visitor	Score	Home	OT	Decision	Attendance	Record	Pts	Recap
1	October 3	Los Angeles	3–2	Minnesota	SO	Quick	18,511	1–0–0	2	Recap
2	October 4	Los Angeles	3–5	Winnipeg		Quick	15,004	1–1–0	2	Recap
3	October 7	NY Rangers	3–1	Los Angeles		Quick	18,118	1–2–0	2	Recap
4	October 9	Ottawa	3–4	Los Angeles	OT	Quick	18,118	2–2–0	4	Recap
5	October 11	Los Angeles	2–1	Carolina	SO	Quick	16,353	3–2–0	6	Recap
6	October 13	Los Angeles	3–0	Florida		Scrivens	12,810	4–2–0	8	Recap
7	October 15	Los Angeles	1–5	Tampa Bay		Quick	16,310	4–3–0	8	Recap
8	October 17	Los Angeles	2–1	Nashville	SO	Quick	16,416	5–3–0	10	Recap
9	October 19	Dallas	2–5	Los Angeles		Quick	18,118	6–3–0	12	Recap
10	October 21	Calgary	3–2	Los Angeles		Quick	18,118	6–4–0	12	Recap
11	October 24	Phoenix	4–7	Los Angeles		Quick	18,118	7–4–0	14	Recap
12	October 27	Edmonton	1–2	Los Angeles	SO	Quick	18,118	8–4–0	16	Recap
13	October 29	Los Angeles	1–3	Phoenix		Scrivens	10,452	8–5–0	16	Recap
14	October 30	San Jose	3–4	Los Angeles	OT	Quick	18,118	9–5–0	18	Recap

November: 7–2–4 (Home: 3–2–2; Road: 4–0–2)
#	Date	Visitor	Score	Home	OT	Decision	Attendance	Record	Pts	Recap
15	November 2	Nashville	4–3	Los Angeles		Quick	18,118	9–6–0	18	Recap
16	November 7	Buffalo	0–2	Los Angeles		Quick	18,118	10–6–0	20	Recap
19	November 9	Vancouver	1–5	Los Angeles		Quick	18,118	11–6–0	22	Recap
18	November 12	Los Angeles	2–3	Buffalo	SO	Scrivens	18,281	11–6–1	23	Recap
19	November 14	Los Angeles	3–2	NY Islanders		Scrivens	13,922	12–6–1	25	Recap
20	November 15	Los Angeles	2–0	New Jersey		Scrivens	12,168	13–6–1	27	Recap
21	November 17	Los Angeles	1–0	NY Rangers		Scrivens	18,006	14–6–1	29	Recap
22	November 19	Tampa Bay	2–5	Los Angeles		Scrivens	18,118	15–6–1	31	Recap
23	November 21	New Jersey	2–1	Los Angeles	OT	Scrivens	18,118	15–6–2	32	Recap
24	November 23	Colorado	1–0	Los Angeles	OT	Scrivens	18,118	15–6–3	33	Recap
25	November 25	Los Angeles	3–2	Vancouver	OT	Scrivens	18,910	16–6–3	35	Recap
26	November 27	Los Angeles	2–3	San Jose	SO	Scrivens	17,562	16–6–4	36	Recap
27	November 30	Calgary	2–1	Los Angeles		Scrivens	18,118	16–7–4	36	Recap

December: 9–5–0 (Home: 5–1–0; Road: 4–4–0)
#	Date	Visitor	Score	Home	OT	Decision	Attendance	Record	Pts	Recap
28	December 2	St. Louis	2–3	Los Angeles		Scrivens	18,118	17–7–4	38	Recap
29	December 3	Los Angeles	3–2	Anaheim	SO	Jones	17,294	18–7–4	40	Recap
30	December 7	NY Islanders	0–3	Los Angeles		Jones	18,118	19–7–4	42	Recap
31	December 10	Los Angeles	6–0	Montreal		Jones	21,273	20–7–4	44	Recap
32	December 11	Los Angeles	3–1	Toronto		Jones	19,375	21–7–4	46	Recap
33	December 14	Los Angeles	5–2	Ottawa		Jones	17,140	22–7–4	48	Recap
34	December 15	Los Angeles	1–3	Chicago		Scrivens	21,426	22–8–4	48	Recap
35	December 17	Edmonton	0–3	Los Angeles		Jones	18,118	23–8–4	50	Recap
36	December 19	San Jose	1–4	Los Angeles		Jones	18,118	24–8–4	52	Recap
37	December 21	Colorado	2–3	Los Angeles	SO	Jones	18,118	25–8–4	54	Recap
38	December 23	Dallas	5–2	Los Angeles		Jones	18,274	25–9–4	54	Recap
39	December 28	Los Angeles	2–3	Nashville		Scrivens	17,113	25–10–4	54	Recap
40	December 30	Los Angeles	0–1	Chicago		Jones	22,161	25–11–4	54	Recap
41	December 31	Los Angeles	2–3	Dallas		Scrivens	15,610	25–12–4	54	Recap

January: 5–8–2 (Home: 3–3–1; Road: 2–5–1)
#	Date	Visitor	Score	Home	OT	Decision	Attendance	Record	Pts	Recap
42	January 2	Los Angeles	0–5	St. Louis		Jones	19,839	25–13–4	54	Recap
43	January 4	Vancouver	1–3	Los Angeles		Quick	18,118	26–13–4	56	Recap
44	January 7	Minnesota	2–1	Los Angeles	SO	Quick	18,118	26–13–5	57	Recap
45	January 9	Boston	2–4	Los Angeles		Quick	18,118	27–13–5	59	Recap
46	January 11	Detroit	3–1	Los Angeles		Quick	18,262	27–14–5	59	Recap
47	January 13	Vancouver	0–1	Los Angeles		Quick	18,118	28–14–5	61	Recap
48	January 16	Los Angeles	4–1	St. Louis		Quick	19,374	29–14–5	63	Recap
49	January 18	Los Angeles	2–3	Detroit	SO	Quick	20,066	29–14–6	64	Recap
50	January 20	Los Angeles	2–3	Boston		Quick	17,565	29–15–6	64	Recap
51	January 21	Los Angeles	3–5	Columbus		Jones	13,286	29–16–6	64	Recap
52	January 23	Los Angeles	1–2	Anaheim		Quick	17,503	29–17–6	64	Recap
53	January 25 (outdoor game)	Anaheim	3–0	Los Angeles		Quick	54,099 (at Dodger Stadium)	29–18–6	64	Recap
54	January 27	Los Angeles	1–0	San Jose		Quick	17,562	30–18–6	66	Recap
55	January 28	Los Angeles	0–3	Phoenix		Quick	13,681	30–19–6	66	Recap
56	January 30	Pittsburgh	4–1	Los Angeles		Quick	18,118	30–20–6	66	Recap

February: 3–2–0 (Home: 1–2–0; Road: 2–0–0)
#	Date	Visitor	Score	Home	OT	Decision	Attendance	Record	Pts	Recap
57	February 1	Philadelphia	2–0	Los Angeles		Quick	18,118	30–21–6	66	Recap
58	February 3	Chicago	5–3	Los Angeles		Quick	18,118	30–22–6	66	Recap
59	February 6	Columbus	1–2	Los Angeles	OT	Quick	18,118	31–22–6	68	Recap
60	February 26	Los Angeles	6–4	Colorado		Jones	16,754	32–22–6	70	Recap
61	February 27	Los Angeles	2–0	Calgary		Quick	19,289	33–22–6	72	Recap

March: 11–4–0 (Home: 5–4–0; Road: 6–0–0)
#	Date	Visitor	Score	Home	OT	Decision	Attendance	Record	Pts	Recap
62	March 1	Carolina	1–3	Los Angeles		Quick	18,118	34–22–6	74	Recap
63	March 3	Montreal	1–2	Los Angeles		Quick	18,118	35–22–6	76	Recap
64	March 6	Los Angeles	3–1	Winnipeg		Quick	15,004	36–22–6	78	Recap
65	March 9	Los Angeles	4–2	Edmonton		Quick	16,839	37–22–6	80	Recap
66	March 10	Los Angeles	3–2	Calgary		Jones	19,289	38–22–6	82	Recap
67	March 13	Toronto	3–2	Los Angeles		Quick	18,319	38–23–6	82	Recap
68	March 15	Anaheim	2–1	Los Angeles		Jones	18,278	38–24–6	82	Recap
69	March 17	Phoenix	4–3	Los Angeles		Quick	18,278	38–25–6	82	Recap
70	March 20	Washington	1–2	Los Angeles	SO	Quick	18,278	39–25–6	84	Recap
71	March 22	Florida	0–4	Los Angeles		Quick	18,118	40–25–6	86	Recap
72	March 24	Los Angeles	3–2	Philadelphia		Quick	19,876	41–25–6	88	Recap
73	March 25	Los Angeles	5–4	Washington	SO	Quick	18,506	42–25–6	90	Recap
74	March 27	Los Angeles	3–2	Pittsburgh		Jones	18,650	43–25–6	92	Recap
75	March 29	Winnipeg	2–4	Los Angeles		Quick	18,118	44–25–6	94	Recap
76	March 31	Minnesota	3–2	Los Angeles		Quick	18,118	44–26–6	94	Recap

April: 2–2–2 (Home: 1–0–1; Road: 1–2–1)
#	Date	Visitor	Score	Home	OT	Decision	Attendance	Record	Pts	Recap
77	April 2	Phoenix	0–4	Los Angeles		Quick	18,118	45–26–6	96	Recap
78	April 3	Los Angeles	1–2	San Jose		Jones	17,562	45–27–6	96	Recap
79	April 5	Los Angeles	1–2	Vancouver		Quick	18,910	45–28–6	96	Recap
80	April 9	Los Angeles	3–4	Calgary	SO	Quick	19,289	45–28–7	97	Recap
81	April 10	Los Angeles	3–0	Edmonton		Jones	16,839	46–28–7	99	Recap
82	April 12	Anaheim	4–3	Los Angeles	SO	Quick	18,372	46–28–8	100	Recap

Legend: Win (2 points) Loss (0 points) Overtime/shootout loss (1 point)

== Playoffs ==
The Los Angeles Kings entered the playoffs as the Pacific Division's third seed and faced the San Jose Sharks in the first round. After going down three games to none, the Kings completed the reverse sweep and won the series, becoming only the fourth to accomplish this feat in NHL history, and the second Stanley Cup winning team after the 1942 Toronto Maple Leafs to do so. In the Divisional Round, the Kings jumped out to a 2–0 lead against the Anaheim Ducks before blowing the next three games, forcing another game seven, which the Kings handily won, earning a trip to the Western Conference Finals and a rematch against the Chicago Blackhawks. After dropping game one at the United Center, the Kings won the next three games before losing game five in double overtime and game six, culminating in another game seven on the road. Despite trailing most of the game, the Kings tied it up at the midway point of the third period, and the score held to the end of regulation. In overtime, Alec Martinez's shot from the point deflected off of Nick Leddy and bobbled up and over Corey Crawford's left shoulder and into the goal, sending the Kings to the Stanley Cup Final.

The Kings were the first team to advance to the Final after playing 21 games, and the first team to win three game sevens on the road. Jonathan Quick also tied Tim Thomas' record for most game seven wins in a playoff year, at three. The Kings clinched their second Stanley Cup Final berth in three years, having won in 2012, and played the Eastern conference champion New York Rangers. It was the first meeting between teams from New York City and Los Angeles for a major professional sports championship since the Yankees and the Dodgers played in the 1981 World Series,

The Kings won the Stanley Cup in a double-overtime game 5 victory. The team tied a then-NHL record for most games played in a single playoff year, at 26, and became the first team to play 26 games and win the Cup.

2014 Stanley Cup playoffs

Western Conference First Round vs. (P2) San Jose Sharks: Los Angeles won series 4–3
#	Date	Visitor	Score	Home	OT	Decision	Attendance	Series	Recap
1	April 17	Los Angeles	3–6	San Jose		Quick	17,562	Sharks lead 1–0	Recap
2	April 20	Los Angeles	2–7	San Jose		Quick	17,562	Sharks lead 2–0	Recap
3	April 22	San Jose	4–3	Los Angeles	OT	Quick	18,390	Sharks lead 3–0	Recap
4	April 24	San Jose	3–6	Los Angeles		Quick	18,376	Sharks lead 3–1	Recap
5	April 26	Los Angeles	3–0	San Jose		Quick	17,562	Sharks lead 3–2	Recap
6	April 28	San Jose	1–4	Los Angeles		Quick	18,384	Series tied 3–3	Recap
7	April 30	Los Angeles	5–1	San Jose		Quick	17,562	Kings won 4–3	Recap

Western Conference Second Round vs. (P1) Anaheim Ducks: Los Angeles won series 4–3
#	Date	Visitor	Score	Home	OT	Decision	Attendance	Series	Recap
1	May 3	Los Angeles	3–2	Anaheim	OT	Quick	17,393	Kings lead 1–0	Recap
2	May 5	Los Angeles	3–1	Anaheim		Quick	17,281	Kings lead 2–0	Recap
3	May 8	Anaheim	3–2	Los Angeles		Quick	18,622	Kings lead 2–1	Recap
4	May 10	Anaheim	2–0	Los Angeles		Quick	18,489	Series tied 2–2	Recap
5	May 12	Los Angeles	3–4	Anaheim		Quick	17,233	Ducks lead 3–2	Recap
6	May 14	Anaheim	1–2	Los Angeles		Quick	18,519	Series tied 3–3	Recap
7	May 16	Los Angeles	6–2	Anaheim		Quick	17,395	Kings won 4–3	Recap

Western Conference Final vs. (C3) Chicago Blackhawks: Los Angeles won series 4–3
#	Date	Visitor	Score	Home	OT	Decision	Attendance	Series	Recap
1	May 18	Los Angeles	1–3	Chicago		Quick	21,832	Hawks lead 1–0	Recap
2	May 21	Los Angeles	6–2	Chicago		Quick	22,019	Series tied 1–1	Recap
3	May 24	Chicago	3–4	Los Angeles		Quick	18,374	Kings lead 2–1	Recap
4	May 26	Chicago	2–5	Los Angeles		Quick	18,468	Kings lead 3–1	Recap
5	May 28	Los Angeles	4–5	Chicago	2OT	Quick	21,871	Kings lead 3–2	Recap
6	May 30	Chicago	4–3	Los Angeles		Quick	18,471	Series tied 3–3	Recap
7	June 1	Los Angeles	5–4	Chicago	OT	Quick	22,315	Kings won 4–3	Recap

Stanley Cup Final vs. (M2) New York Rangers: Los Angeles won series 4–1
#	Date	Visitor	Score	Home	OT	Decision	Attendance	Series	Recap
1	June 4	New York	2–3	Los Angeles	OT	Quick	18,399	Kings lead 1–0	Recap
2	June 7	New York	4–5	Los Angeles	2OT	Quick	18,532	Kings lead 2–0	Recap
3	June 9	Los Angeles	3–0	New York		Quick	18,006	Kings lead 3–0	Recap
4	June 11	Los Angeles	1–2	New York		Quick	18,006	Kings lead 3–1	Recap
5	June 13	New York	2–3	Los Angeles	2OT	Quick	18,532	Kings won 4–1	Recap

Legend: Win Loss

== Player statistics ==
=== Skaters ===
Note: GP = Games played; G = Goals; A = Assists; Pts = Points; +/− = Plus/minus; PIM = Penalty minutes
Final Stats

Regular season									Playoffs					
#	Player	Pos.	GP	G	A	Pts	+/–	PIM	GP	G	A	Pts	+/–	PIM
11	Anze Kopitar	C	82	29	41	70	34	24	26	5	21	26	9	14
77	Jeff Carter	C/RW	72	27	23	50	8	44	26	10	15	25	5	4
14	Justin Williams	RW	82	19	24	43	14	48	26	9	16	25	13	35
10	Mike Richards	C	82	11	30	41	-6	28	26	3	7	10	-6	17
8	Drew Doughty	D	78	10	27	37	18	64	26	5	13	18	2	30
26	Slava Voynov	D	82	4	30	34	6	44	26	2	7	9	4	16
74	Dwight King	LW	77	15	15	30	16	18	26	3	8	11	5	20
73	Tyler Toffoli	RW	62	12	17	29	21	10	26	7	7	14	6	10
23	Dustin Brown	RW/LW	79	15	12	27	7	66	26	6	8	14	7	22
28	Jarret Stoll	C	78	8	19	27	9	48	26	3	3	6	6	18
6	Jake Muzzin	D	76	5	19	24	8	58	26	6	6	12	6	8
27	Alec Martinez	D	61	11	11	22	17	14	26	5	5	10	1	12
12	Marian Gaborik*	LW	19	5	11	16	7	4	26	14	8	22	6	6
44	Robyn Regehr	D	79	3	11	14	6	46	8	0	2	2	0	7
33	Willie Mitchell	D	76	1	11	12	14	58	18	1	3	4	10	20
22	Trevor Lewis	C/RW	73	6	5	11	-1	6	26	4	1	5	-6	6
71	Jordan Nolan	C/RW	64	6	4	10	-1	54	3	0	0	0	-3	2
13	Kyle Clifford	LW	71	3	5	8	6	81	24	1	6	7	-2	39
70	Tanner Pearson	LW	25	3	4	7	2	8	24	4	8	12	10	8
2	Matt Greene	D	38	2	4	6	6	47	20	0	4	4	5	16
21	Matt Frattin †	RW/LW	40	2	4	6	-6	11						
57	Linden Vey	RW/C	18	0	5	5	0	0	—	—	—	—	—	—
17	Daniel Carcillo †	LW	26	1	1	2	-1	57						
24	Colin Fraser	C	33	0	2	2	-4	30	—	—	—	—	—	—
81	Andrew Campbell ‡	D	3	0	0	0	0	0						
55	Jeff Schultz	D	—	—	—	—	—	—	7	0	0	0	-1	0

- * Denotes player spent time with another team before joining the Kings. Statistics reflect time with the Kings only.
- † Traded mid-season. Statistics reflect time with the Kings only.
- ‡ Sent to minors mid-season. Did not later rejoin the Kings that season.

=== Goaltenders ===
Note: Pos = Position;GP = Games played; Min, TOI = Minutes played; W = Wins; L = Losses; T,T/OT = Ties; OTL = Overtime losses; GA = Goals-against; GAA = Goals-against average; SO = Shutouts; SA = Shots against; SV = Shots saved; SV% = Save percentage;

Final stats

Regular season
#	Player	GP	GS	TOI	W	L	OTL	GA	GAA	SA	SV%	SO	G	A	PIM
32	Jonathan Quick	49	49	2904	27	17	4	100	2.07	1183	.915	6	0	2	2
31	Martin Jones	19	18	1095	12	6	0	33	1.81	500	.934	4	0	1	0
54	Ben Scrivens †	19	15	975	7	5	4	32	1.97	464	.931	3	0	1	0

Playoffs
#	Player	GP	GS	TOI	W	L	GA	GAA	SA	SV%	SO	G	A	PIM
32	Jonathan Quick	26	26	1605	16	9	69	2.58	774	.911	2	0	0	4
31	Martin Jones	2	0	56	0	0	0	0.00	7	1.000	0	0	0	0

- * Denotes player spent time with another team before joining the Kings. Statistics reflect time with the Kings only.
- † Traded mid-season. Statistics reflect time with the Kings only.
- ‡ Sent to minors mid-season. Did not later rejoin the Kings that season.

== Awards and records ==
=== Awards ===
Regular season
Player	Award	Awarded
Justin Williams	Conn Smythe Trophy	June 14, 2014
Dustin Brown	Mark Messier NHL Leadership Award	June 24, 2014
Jonathan Quick	William M. Jennings Trophy	June 24, 2014

== Transactions ==
The Kings have been involved in the following transactions during the 2013–14 season:

=== Trades ===
June 30, 2013	To Edmonton Oilers 2nd-round pick (57th overall) in 2013; 3rd-round pick in 2013; 4th-round pick in 2013	To Los Angeles Kings 2nd-round pick (37th overall) in 2013
June 30, 2013	To New Jersey Devils 7th-round pick in 2013	To Los Angeles Kings 7th-round pick in 2015
July 16, 2013	To Chicago Blackhawks Conditional 6th-round pick in 2015	To Los Angeles Kings Daniel Carcillo
January 4, 2014	To New York Rangers Daniel Carcillo	To Los Angeles Kings Conditional 7th-round pick in 2014
January 15, 2014	To Edmonton Oilers Ben Scrivens	To Los Angeles Kings 3rd-round pick in 2014
January 22, 2014	To Toronto Maple Leafs Brandon Kozun	To Los Angeles Kings Andrew Crescenzi
February 6, 2014	To Montreal Canadiens Robert Czarnik	To Los Angeles Kings Steve Quailer
March 5, 2014	To Buffalo Sabres Nicolas Deslauriers; Hudson Fasching	To Los Angeles Kings Brayden McNabb; Jonathan Parker; 2nd-round pick in 2014; 2nd-round pick in 2015
March 5, 2014	To San Jose Sharks Conditional 7th-round pick in 2016	To Los Angeles Kings James Livingston
March 5, 2014	To Columbus Blue Jackets Matt Frattin; Conditional 2nd-round pick in 2014 or 2015; Conditional 3rd-round pick in 2014 or 2015	To Los Angeles Kings Marian Gaborik

=== Free agents signed ===
Player	Former team	Contract terms
Jeff Schultz	Washington Capitals	1 year, $700,000
Brian O'Neill	Manchester Monarchs	1 year, $605,000
Vincent LoVerde	Manchester Monarchs	1 year, $550,000 entry-level contract

=== Free agents lost ===
Player	New team	Contract terms
Brad Richardson	Vancouver Canucks	2 year, $2.3 million
Rob Scuderi	Pittsburgh Penguins	4 years, $13.5 million
Dustin Penner	Anaheim Ducks	1 year, $2 million

=== Claimed via waivers ===
Player	Previous team	Date

=== Lost via waivers ===
Player	New team	Date claimed off waivers
Marc-Andre Cliche	Colorado Avalanche	September 22, 2013
Keaton Ellerby	Winnipeg Jets	November 2, 2013

=== Lost via retirement ===
Player

=== Player signings ===
Player	Date	Contract terms
Keaton Ellerby	July 4, 2013	1 year, $735,000
Maxim Kitsyn	July 10, 2013	3 years, $1.8075 million entry-level contract
Jake Muzzin	July 12, 2013	2 years, $2 million
Alec Martinez	July 15, 2013	2 years, $2.2 million
Dustin Brown	July 18, 2013	8 years, $47 million contract extension
Jordan Nolan	July 21, 2013	2 years, $1.4 million
Trevor Lewis	July 23, 2013	1 year, $1.325 million
Andrew Bodnarchuk	July 29, 2013	2 years, $1.1 million
Colin Miller	July 29, 2013	3 years, $1.8075 million entry-level contract
Kyle Clifford	August 2, 2013	2 years, $2.15 million
Martin Jones	September 10, 2013	2 years, $1.1 million
Patrik Bartosak	March 5, 2014	3 years, $1.86 million entry-level contract
Michael Mersch	April 5, 2014	3 years, $2.36 million entry-level contract
Trevor Lewis	April 8, 2014	2 years, $3.05 million contract extension
Nic Dowd	April 9, 2014	1 year, $750,000 entry-level contract
Brian O'Neill	May 1, 2014	2 years, $1.125 million contract extension
Valentin Zykov	May 27, 2014	3 years, $2.775 million entry-level contract
Nick Ebert	May 28, 2014	3 years, $2.075 million entry-level contract
Matt Greene	June 24, 2014	4 years, $10 million contract extension
Marian Gaborik	June 25, 2014	7 years, $34.125 million

== Draft picks ==
Los Angeles Kings' picks at the 2013 NHL entry draft, that was held in Newark, New Jersey on June 30, 2013.

Round	#	Player	Pos	Nationality	College/junior/club team (league)
2	37	Valentin Zykov	LW	Russia	Baie-Comeau Drakkar (QMJHL)
4	103^{[a]}	Justin Auger	RW	Canada	Guelph Storm (OHL)
4	118	Hudson Fasching	RW	United States	U.S. National Team Development Program (USHL)
5	146	Patrik Bartosak	G	Czech Republic	Red Deer Rebels (WHL)
5	148^{[b]}	Jonny Brodzinski	RW	United States	St. Cloud State University (WCHA)
6	178	Zachary Leslie	D	Canada	Guelph Storm (OHL)
7	191^{[c]}	Dominik Kubalik	LW	Czech Republic	Sudbury Wolves (OHL)

Draft notes

- The Los Angeles Kings' first-round pick went to the Columbus Blue Jackets as the result of a February 23, 2012, trade that sent Jeff Carter to the Kings in exchange for Jack Johnson and this pick.
- The Edmonton Oilers' second-round pick went to the Los Angeles Kings as the result of a trade on June 30, 2013, that sent a second and third-round pick in 2013 (57th and 88th overall) and Carolina's fourth-round pick in 2013 (96th overall) to Edmonton in exchange for this pick.
- The Los Angeles Kings' second-round pick went to the St. Louis Blues (via Edmonton), Los Angeles traded this pick to the Edmonton Oilers as the result of a trade on June 30, 2013, that sent a second-round pick in 2013 (37th overall) to Los Angeles in exchange for a third-round pick in 2013 (88th overall), Carolina's fourth-round pick in 2013 (96th overall) and this pick.
- The Los Angeles Kings' third-round pick went to the Edmonton Oilers as the result of a trade on June 30, 2013, that sent a second-round pick in 2013 (37th overall) to Los Angeles in exchange for a second-round pick in 2013 (57th overall), Carolina's fourth-round pick in 2013 (96th overall) and this pick.
- ^{a} The Phoenix Coyotes' fourth-round pick went to the Los Angeles Kings (via Columbus and Philadelphia) as a result of a February 26, 2013, trade that sent Simon Gagne to the Flyers in exchange for this pick.
- ^{b} The Montreal Canadiens' fifth-round pick went to the Los Angeles Kings as a result of an April 2, 2013, trade that sent Davis Drewiske to the Canadiens in exchange for this pick.
- ^{c} The Dallas Stars' seventh-round pick went to the Los Angeles Kings as a result of a June 23, 2012, trade that sent Edmonton's 2012 seventh-round pick to the Stars in exchange for this pick.
- The Los Angeles Kings' seventh-round pick went to the New Jersey Devils as the result of a trade on June 30, 2013, that sent a seventh-round pick in 2015 to Los Angeles in exchange for this pick.
