= 2013–14 New York Rangers season =

National Hockey League season

2013–14 New York Rangers
- Eastern Conference champions
- Division: 2nd Metropolitan
- Conference: 5th Eastern
- 2013–14 record: 45–31–6
- Home record: 20–17–4
- Road record: 25–14–2
- Goals for: 218
- Goals against: 193

Team information
- General manager: Glen Sather
- Coach: Alain Vigneault
- Captain: Ryan Callahan (Oct.–Mar.); Vacant (Mar.–Jun.)
- Alternate captains: Dan Girardi (Mar.–Jun.); Brad Richards; Marc Staal
- Arena: Madison Square Garden
- Average attendance: 18,006
- Minor league affiliates: Hartford Wolf Pack (AHL); Greenville Road Warriors (ECHL)

Team leaders
- Goals: Rick Nash (26)
- Assists: Derek Stepan; Mats Zuccarello (40)
- Points: Mats Zuccarello (59)
- Penalty minutes: Derek Dorsett (128)
- Plus/minus: Chris Kreider (+14)
- Wins: Henrik Lundqvist (33)
- Goals against average: Cam Talbot (1.64)

The 2013–14 New York Rangers season was the franchise's 87th season of play and their 88th season overall. It was the Rangers' first season in the newly created Metropolitan Division, which was created during the NHL's realignment in the 2013 off-season. The Rangers won 25 road games in the regular season, setting a franchise record. The Rangers returned to the Stanley Cup Final for the first time since their championship in the 1993–94 season, losing in five games to the Los Angeles Kings.

== Off-season ==
The Rangers first order of business for the 2013–14 season was to find a new head coach after letting John Tortorella go on May 29, 2013. The Rangers hired recently fired Canucks coach Alain Vigneault on June 21. Coincidentally, Tortorella would be hired as the new Canucks coach only days after Vigneault was hired by the Rangers. The Rangers finished their coaching staff on August 6 by hiring Scott Arniel as an associate coach, along with former players Ulf Samuelsson and Daniel Lacroix as assistant coaches.

== Pre-season ==
The New York Rangers lost five of their six pre-season games, during which they scored nine goals and allowed 22 goals against. They went 2-for-22 on the power play and allowed five power play goals against in the last three games.

== Regular season ==
Due to final stages of renovations at Madison Square Garden, the Rangers opened the season on a nine-game road trip from October 3 to 24, during which the team went 3–6–0. The Rangers had a franchise-record nine-game homestand from December 7 to 23, during which they had a record of 3–4–2.

As part of the 2014 NHL Stadium Series games, the Rangers played two consecutive outdoor games at Yankee Stadium on January 26 against the New Jersey Devils (7–3 win) and on January 29 against the New York Islanders (2–1 win).

The NHL took a two-week break from February 9 to February 25 for the Olympics. The Rangers had seven players represent their countries: Ryan Callahan, Ryan McDonagh and Derek Stepan for the United States; Rick Nash for Canada; Mats Zuccarello for Norway; and Carl Hagelin and Henrik Lundqvist for Sweden.

On April 7, with a New Jersey Devils loss to the Calgary Flames, the Rangers clinched a playoff spot for the fourth consecutive season, and for the eighth time out of nine seasons.

On April 10, with a 2–1 win over the Buffalo Sabres and a Philadelphia Flyers 4–2 loss to the Tampa Bay Lightning, the Rangers clinched second place in their division and home ice advantage for the first round of the Stanley Cup playoffs.

== Standings ==
Metropolitan Division
| Pos | Team | GP | W | L | OTL | ROW | GF | GA | GD | Pts |
|---|---|---|---|---|---|---|---|---|---|---|
| 1 | y – Pittsburgh Penguins | 82 | 51 | 24 | 7 | 44 | 249 | 207 | +42 | 109 |
| 2 | x – New York Rangers | 82 | 45 | 31 | 6 | 41 | 218 | 193 | +25 | 96 |
| 3 | x – Philadelphia Flyers | 82 | 42 | 30 | 10 | 39 | 236 | 235 | +1 | 94 |
| 4 | x – Columbus Blue Jackets | 82 | 43 | 32 | 7 | 38 | 231 | 216 | +15 | 93 |
| 5 | Washington Capitals | 82 | 38 | 30 | 14 | 28 | 235 | 240 | −5 | 90 |
| 6 | New Jersey Devils | 82 | 35 | 29 | 18 | 35 | 197 | 208 | −11 | 88 |
| 7 | Carolina Hurricanes | 82 | 36 | 35 | 11 | 34 | 207 | 230 | −23 | 83 |
| 8 | New York Islanders | 82 | 34 | 37 | 11 | 25 | 225 | 267 | −42 | 79 |

Source: National Hockey League
x – Clinched playoff spot; y – Clinched division

== Schedule and results ==
=== Pre-season ===
2013 pre-season: 1–5–0 (home: 0–0–0; road: 1–5–0)

| Game | September | Opponent | Score | Record |
|---|---|---|---|---|
| 1 | 16 | @ New Jersey Devils | 1–2 | 0–1–0 |
| 2 | 17 | @ Philadelphia Flyers | 3–2 | 1–1–0 |
| 3 | 23 | @ Calgary Flames | 1–4 | 1–2–0 |
| 4 | 24 | @ Edmonton Oilers | 3–5 | 1–3–0 |
| 5 | 26 | @ Vancouver Canucks | 0–5 | 1–4–0 |
| 6 | 27 | @ Los Angeles Kings^{a} | 1–4 | 1–5–0 |
^{a} Game was played at the MGM Grand Garden Arena in Paradise, Nevada, as part of the Frozen Fury series of exhibition games.

=== Regular season ===
2013–14 game log
October: 5–7–0, 10 Points (home: 1–1–0; road: 4–6–0)

| Game | October | Opponent | Score | Decision | Record |
|---|---|---|---|---|---|
| 1 | 3 | @ Phoenix Coyotes | 1–4 | Lundqvist | 0–1–0 |
| 2 | 7 | @ Los Angeles Kings | 3–1 | Lundqvist | 1–1–0 |
| 3 | 8 | @ San Jose Sharks | 2–9 | Lundqvist | 1–2–0 |
| 4 | 10 | @ Anaheim Ducks | 0–6 | Lundqvist | 1–3–0 |
| 5 | 12 | @ St. Louis Blues | 3–5 | Biron | 1–4–0 |
| 6 | 16 | @ Washington Capitals | 2–0 | Lundqvist | 2–4–0 |
| 7 | 19 | @ New Jersey Devils | 0–4 | Lundqvist | 2–5–0 |
| 8 | 24 | @ Philadelphia Flyers | 1–2 | Talbot | 2–6–0 |
| 9 | 26 | @ Detroit Red Wings | 3–2 (OT) | Talbot | 3–6–0 |
| 10 | 28 | Montreal Canadiens | 0–2 | Lundqvist | 3–7–0 |
| 11 | 29 | @ New York Islanders | 3–2 | Talbot | 4–7–0 |
| 12 | 31 | Buffalo Sabres | 2–0 | Lundqvist | 5–7–0 |

November: 9–6–0, 18 Points (home: 4–4–0; road: 5–2–0)

| Game | November | Opponent | Score | Decision | Record |
|---|---|---|---|---|---|
| 13 | 2 | Carolina Hurricanes | 5–1 | Lundqvist | 6–7–0 |
| 14 | 4 | Anaheim Ducks | 1–2 | Lundqvist | 6–8–0 |
| 15 | 6 | Pittsburgh Penguins | 5–1 | Lundqvist | 7–8–0 |
| 16 | 7 | @ Columbus Blue Jackets | 4–2 | Talbot | 8–8–0 |
| 17 | 10 | Florida Panthers | 4–3 | Lundqvist | 9–8–0 |
| 18 | 12 | New Jersey Devils | 3–2 | Lundqvist | 9–9–0 |
| 19 | 16 | @ Montreal Canadiens | 1–0 | Talbot | 10–9–0 |
| 20 | 17 | Los Angeles Kings | 0–1 | Lundqvist | 10–10–0 |
| 21 | 19 | Boston Bruins | 1–2 | Lundqvist | 10–11–0 |
| 22 | 21 | @ Dallas Stars | 3–2 | Lundqvist | 11–11–0 |
| 23 | 23 | @ Nashville Predators | 2–0 | Talbot | 12–11–0 |
| 24 | 25 | @ Tampa Bay Lightning | 0–5 | Lundqvist | 12–12–0 |
| 25 | 27 | @ Florida Panthers | 5–2 | Lundqvist | 13–12–0 |
| 26 | 29 | @ Boston Bruins | 2–3 | Lundqvist | 13–13–0 |
| 27 | 30 | Vancouver Canucks | 5–2 | Talbot | 14–13–0 |

December: 6–6–2, 14 Points (home: 3–5–2; road: 3–1–0)

| Game | December | Opponent | Score | Decision | Record |
|---|---|---|---|---|---|
| 28 | 2 | Winnipeg Jets | 2–5 | Talbot | 14–14–0 |
| 29 | 5 | @ Buffalo Sabres | 3–1 | Lundqvist | 15–14–0 |
| 30 | 7 | New Jersey Devils | 3–4 (OT) | Lundqvist | 15–14–1 |
| 31 | 8 | Washington Capitals | 1–4 | Lundqvist | 15–15–1 |
| 32 | 10 | Nashville Predators | 1–4 | Lundqvist | 15–16–1 |
| 33 | 12 | Columbus Blue Jackets | 2–4 | Lundqvist | 15–17–1 |
| 34 | 15 | Calgary Flames | 4–3 (SO) | Lundqvist | 16–17–1 |
| 35 | 18 | Pittsburgh Penguins | 3–4 (SO) | Lundqvist | 16–17–2 |
| 36 | 20 | New York Islanders | 3–5 | Lundqvist | 16–18–2 |
| 37 | 22 | Minnesota Wild | 4–1 | Talbot | 17–18–2 |
| 38 | 23 | Toronto Maple Leafs | 2–1 (SO) | Talbot | 18–18–2 |
| 39 | 27 | @ Washington Capitals | 2–3 | Talbot | 18–19–2 |
| 40 | 29 | @ Tampa Bay Lightning | 4–3 | Lundqvist | 19–19–2 |
| 41 | 31 | @ Florida Panthers | 2–1 (SO) | Lundqvist | 20–19–2 |

January: 10–4–1, 21 Points (home: 5–3–1; road: 5–1–0)

| Game | January | Opponent | Score | Decision | Record |
|---|---|---|---|---|---|
| 42 | 3 | @ Pittsburgh Penguins | 2–5 | Lundqvist | 20–20–2 |
| 43 | 4 | @ Toronto Maple Leafs | 7–1 | Talbot | 21–20–2 |
| 44 | 6 | Columbus Blue Jackets | 3–4 (SO) | Lundqvist | 21–20–3 |
| 45 | 8 | @ Chicago Blackhawks | 3–2 | Lundqvist | 22–20–3 |
| 46 | 10 | Dallas Stars | 3–2 | Lundqvist | 23–20–3 |
| 47 | 12 | Philadelphia Flyers | 4–1 | Lundqvist | 24–20–3 |
| 48 | 14 | Tampa Bay Lightning | 1–2 | Lundqvist | 24–21–3 |
| 49 | 16 | Detroit Red Wings | 1–0 | Lundqvist | 25–21–3 |
| 50 | 18 | @ Ottawa Senators | 4–1 | Talbot | 26–21–3 |
| 51 | 19 | Washington Capitals | 4–1 | Lundqvist | 27–21–3 |
| 52 | 21 | New York Islanders | 3–5 | Talbot | 27–22–3 |
| 53 | 23 | St. Louis Blues | 1–2 | Lundqvist | 27–23–3 |
| 54 | 26^{a} | @ New Jersey Devils | 7–3 | Lundqvist | 28–23–3 |
| 55 | 29^{a} | @ New York Islanders | 2–1 | Lundqvist | 29–23–3 |
| 56 | 31 | New York Islanders | 4–1 | Lundqvist | 30–23–3 |
^{a} Games were played at Yankee Stadium in The Bronx, New York.

February: 3–1–0, 6 Points (home: 2–1–0; road: 1–0–0)

| Game | February | Opponent | Score | Decision | Record |
|---|---|---|---|---|---|
| 57 | 4 | Colorado Avalanche | 5–1 | Lundqvist | 31–23–3 |
| 58 | 6 | Edmonton Oilers | 1–2 | Talbot | 31–24–3 |
| 59 | 7 | @ Pittsburgh Penguins | 4–3 (SO) | Lundqvist | 32–24–3 |
| 60 | 27 | Chicago Blackhawks | 2–1 | Talbot | 33–24–3 |

March: 9–6–1, 17 Points (home: 3–2–1; road: 6–4–0)

| Game | March | Opponent | Score | Decision | Record |
|---|---|---|---|---|---|
| 61 | 1 | @ Philadelphia Flyers | 2–4 | Lundqvist | 33–25–3 |
| 62 | 2 | Boston Bruins | 3–6 | Lundqvist | 33–26–3 |
| 63 | 5 | Toronto Maple Leafs | 2–3 (OT) | Lundqvist | 33–26–4 |
| 64 | 7 | @ Carolina Hurricanes | 4–2 | Lundqvist | 34–26–4 |
| 65 | 9 | Detroit Red Wings | 3–0 | Lundqvist | 35–26–4 |
| 66 | 11 | @ Carolina Hurricanes | 1–3 | Lundqvist | 35–27–4 |
| 67 | 13 | @ Minnesota Wild | 1–2 | Talbot | 35–28–4 |
| 68 | 14 | @ Winnipeg Jets | 4–2 | Lundqvist | 36–28–4 |
| 69 | 16 | San Jose Sharks | 0–1 | Lundqvist | 36–29–4 |
| 70 | 18 | @ Ottawa Senators | 8–4 | Lundqvist | 37–29–4 |
| 71 | 21 | @ Columbus Blue Jackets | 3–1 | Lundqvist | 38–29–4 |
| 72 | 22 | @ New Jersey Devils | 2–0 | Lundqvist | 39–29–4 |
| 73 | 24 | Phoenix Coyotes | 4–3 OT | Lundqvist | 40–29–4 |
| 74 | 26 | Philadelphia Flyers | 3–1 | Lundqvist | 41–29–4 |
| 75 | 28 | @ Calgary Flames | 3–4 | Lundqvist | 41–30–4 |
| 76 | 30 | @ Edmonton Oilers | 5–0 | Talbot | 42–30–4 |

April: 3–1–2, 8 Points (home: 2–1–0; road: 1–0–2)

| Game | April | Opponent | Score | Decision | Record |
|---|---|---|---|---|---|
| 77 | 1 | @ Vancouver Canucks | 3–1 | Lundqvist | 43–30–4 |
| 78 | 3 | @ Colorado Avalanche | 2–3 (SO) | Lundqvist | 43–30–5 |
| 79 | 5 | Ottawa Senators | 2–3 | Lundqvist | 43–31–5 |
| 80 | 8 | Carolina Hurricanes | 4–1 | Lundqvist | 44–31–5 |
| 81 | 10 | Buffalo Sabres | 2–1 | Lundqvist | 45–31–5 |
| 82 | 12 | @ Montreal Canadiens | 0–1 (OT) | Talbot | 45–31–6 |

== Playoffs ==
The New York Rangers ended the 2013–14 regular season as the Metropolitan Division's second seed. They defeated the third seed Philadelphia Flyers in the first round, 4–3. Then they faced the first seed Pittsburgh Penguins in the second round of the playoffs. For the first time in Rangers history, the team came back from a 3–1 series deficit to win the series in seven games to reach the third round for the first time since 1997. Next, they defeated the Atlantic Division's third seed Montreal Canadiens in the Eastern Conference Final in the third round, 4–2, and became the Eastern Conference Champions. They are the first team in NHL history that played the maximum of 14 games over the first two rounds and still had enough to advance to the final. After 20 years, the Rangers headed to the Stanley Cup Final, where they faced the Western Conference champion Los Angeles Kings, marking the first time since the Yankees and the Dodgers played in the 1981 World Series that teams from New York City and Los Angeles met for a major professional sports championship. The Rangers lost three games in overtime and lost the series 4–1.

2014 Stanley Cup playoffs
Eastern Conference First Round vs. (M3) Philadelphia Flyers – Rangers won series 4–3

| Game | Date | Opponent | Score | Decision | Series |
|---|---|---|---|---|---|
| 1 | April 17 | Philadelphia Flyers | 4–1 | Lundqvist | Rangers lead 1–0 |
| 2 | April 20 | Philadelphia Flyers | 2–4 | Lundqvist | Series tied 1–1 |
| 3 | April 22 | @ Philadelphia Flyers | 4–1 | Lundqvist | Rangers lead 2–1 |
| 4 | April 25 | @ Philadelphia Flyers | 1–2 | Lundqvist | Series tied 2–2 |
| 5 | April 27 | Philadelphia Flyers | 4–2 | Lundqvist | Rangers lead 3–2 |
| 6 | April 29 | @ Philadelphia Flyers | 2–5 | Lundqvist | Series tied 3–3 |
| 7 | April 30 | Philadelphia Flyers | 2–1 | Lundqvist | Rangers win 4–3 |

Eastern Conference Second Round vs. (M1) Pittsburgh Penguins – Rangers won series 4–3

| Game | Date | Opponent | Score | Decision | Series |
|---|---|---|---|---|---|
| 1 | May 2 | @ Pittsburgh Penguins | 3–2 OT | Lundqvist | Rangers lead 1–0 |
| 2 | May 4 | @ Pittsburgh Penguins | 0–3 | Lundqvist | Series tied 1–1 |
| 3 | May 5 | Pittsburgh Penguins | 0–2 | Lundqvist | Penguins lead 2–1 |
| 4 | May 7 | Pittsburgh Penguins | 2–4 | Lundqvist | Penguins lead 3–1 |
| 5 | May 9 | @ Pittsburgh Penguins | 5–1 | Lundqvist | Penguins lead 3–2 |
| 6 | May 11 | Pittsburgh Penguins | 3–1 | Lundqvist | Series tied 3–3 |
| 7 | May 13 | @ Pittsburgh Penguins | 2–1 | Lundqvist | Rangers win 4–3 |

Eastern Conference Final vs. (A3) Montreal Canadiens – Rangers won series 4–2

| Game | Date | Opponent | Score | Decision | Series |
|---|---|---|---|---|---|
| 1 | May 17 | @ Montreal Canadiens | 7–2 | Lundqvist | Rangers lead 1–0 |
| 2 | May 19 | @ Montreal Canadiens | 3–1 | Lundqvist | Rangers lead 2–0 |
| 3 | May 22 | Montreal Canadiens | 2–3 OT | Lundqvist | Rangers lead 2–1 |
| 4 | May 25 | Montreal Canadiens | 3–2 OT | Lundqvist | Rangers lead 3–1 |
| 5 | May 27 | @ Montreal Canadiens | 4–7 | Talbot | Rangers lead 3–2 |
| 6 | May 29 | Montreal Canadiens | 1–0 | Lundqvist | Rangers win 4–2 |

Stanley Cup Final vs. (P3) Los Angeles Kings – Kings won series 4–1

| Game | Date | Opponent | Score | Decision | Series |
|---|---|---|---|---|---|
| 1 | June 4 | @ Los Angeles Kings | 2–3 OT | Lundqvist | Kings lead 1–0 |
| 2 | June 7 | @ Los Angeles Kings | 4–5 2OT | Lundqvist | Kings lead 2–0 |
| 3 | June 9 | Los Angeles Kings | 0–3 | Lundqvist | Kings lead 3–0 |
| 4 | June 11 | Los Angeles Kings | 2–1 | Lundqvist | Kings lead 3–1 |
| 5 | June 13 | @ Los Angeles Kings | 2–3 2OT | Lundqvist | Kings win 4–1 |

Win Loss

== Player statistics ==
Final stats

Skaters

Regular season
| Player | GP | G | A | Pts | +/− | PIM |
|---|---|---|---|---|---|---|
| Mats Zuccarello | 77 | 19 | 40 | 59 | 11 | 32 |
| Derek Stepan | 82 | 17 | 40 | 57 | 12 | 18 |
| Brad Richards | 82 | 20 | 31 | 51 | −8 | 18 |
| Derick Brassard | 81 | 18 | 27 | 45 | 2 | 46 |
| Ryan McDonagh | 77 | 14 | 29 | 43 | 11 | 36 |
| Rick Nash | 65 | 26 | 13 | 39 | 10 | 36 |
| Chris Kreider | 66 | 17 | 20 | 37 | 14 | 72 |
| Benoit Pouliot | 80 | 15 | 21 | 36 | 10 | 56 |
| Carl Hagelin | 72 | 17 | 16 | 33 | 8 | 44 |
| Ryan Callahan^{‡} | 45 | 11 | 14 | 25 | −3 | 16 |
| Dan Girardi | 81 | 5 | 19 | 24 | 6 | 16 |
| Dominic Moore | 73 | 6 | 12 | 18 | 0 | 18 |
| Brian Boyle | 82 | 6 | 12 | 18 | 1 | 56 |
| John Moore | 74 | 4 | 11 | 15 | 7 | 25 |
| Marc Staal | 72 | 3 | 11 | 14 | −1 | 24 |
| Anton Stralman | 81 | 1 | 12 | 13 | 9 | 26 |
| Michael Del Zotto^{‡} | 42 | 2 | 9 | 11 | −5 | 10 |
| Derek Dorsett | 51 | 4 | 4 | 8 | −1 | 128 |
| Martin St. Louis^{†} | 19 | 1 | 7 | 8 | 1 | 4 |
| J. T. Miller | 30 | 3 | 3 | 6 | −6 | 18 |
| Kevin Klein^{†} | 30 | 1 | 5 | 6 | 4 | 0 |
| Daniel Carcillo^{†} | 31 | 3 | 0 | 3 | 0 | 43 |
| Raphael Diaz^{†} | 11 | 1 | 1 | 2 | 5 | 4 |
| Justin Falk | 21 | 0 | 2 | 2 | −5 | 20 |
| Taylor Pyatt^{‡} | 22 | 0 | 1 | 1 | −9 | 10 |
| Arron Asham | 6 | 0 | 0 | 0 | −5 | 14 |
| Darroll Powe | 1 | 0 | 0 | 0 | −2 | 0 |
| Dylan McIlrath | 2 | 0 | 0 | 0 | −1 | 7 |
| Jesper Fast | 11 | 0 | 0 | 0 | −5 | 2 |
| Conor Allen | 3 | 0 | 0 | 0 | −1 | 0 |
| Brandon Mashinter^{‡} | 6 | 0 | 0 | 0 | −1 | 10 |

Playoffs
| Player | GP | G | A | Pts | +/− | PIM |
|---|---|---|---|---|---|---|
| Ryan McDonagh | 25 | 4 | 13 | 17 | −1 | 8 |
| Martin St. Louis | 25 | 8 | 7 | 15 | −5 | 2 |
| Derek Stepan | 24 | 5 | 10 | 15 | −1 | 2 |
| Chris Kreider | 15 | 5 | 8 | 13 | −2 | 14 |
| Mats Zuccarello | 25 | 5 | 8 | 13 | 7 | 20 |
| Carl Hagelin | 25 | 7 | 5 | 12 | 0 | 16 |
| Derick Brassard | 23 | 6 | 6 | 12 | 4 | 8 |
| Brad Richards | 25 | 5 | 7 | 12 | −2 | 4 |
| Benoit Pouliot | 25 | 5 | 5 | 10 | 8 | 26 |
| Rick Nash | 25 | 3 | 7 | 10 | −1 | 8 |
| Dominic Moore | 25 | 3 | 5 | 8 | −3 | 24 |
| Brian Boyle | 25 | 3 | 5 | 8 | −3 | 19 |
| Dan Girardi | 25 | 1 | 6 | 7 | −3 | 10 |
| Marc Staal | 25 | 1 | 4 | 5 | 0 | 6 |
| Anton Stralman | 25 | 0 | 5 | 5 | 4 | 4 |
| Kevin Klein | 25 | 1 | 3 | 4 | 7 | 6 |
| Daniel Carcillo | 8 | 2 | 0 | 2 | 1 | 22 |
| John Moore | 21 | 0 | 2 | 2 | 2 | 16 |
| J. T. Miller | 4 | 0 | 2 | 2 | 3 | 2 |
| Derek Dorsett | 23 | 0 | 1 | 1 | −2 | 19 |
| Jesper Fast | 3 | 0 | 1 | 1 | 0 | 0 |
| Raphael Diaz | 4 | 0 | 0 | 0 | −1 | 0 |

Goaltenders

Regular season
| Player | GP | GS | TOI | W | L | OT | GA | GAA | SA | SV% | SO | G | A | PIM |
|---|---|---|---|---|---|---|---|---|---|---|---|---|---|---|
| Henrik Lundqvist | 63 | 62 | 3655 | 33 | 24 | 5 | 144 | 2.36 | 1810 | 0.920 | 5 | 0 | 4 | 0 |
| Cam Talbot | 21 | 19 | 1211 | 12 | 6 | 1 | 33 | 1.64 | 560 | 0.941 | 3 | 0 | 0 | 0 |
| Martin Biron | 2 | 1 | 71 | 0 | 1 | 0 | 9 | 7.61 | 38 | 0.763 | 0 | 0 | 0 | 0 |

Playoffs
| Player | GP | GS | TOI | W | L | GA | GAA | SA | SV% | SO | G | A | PIM |
|---|---|---|---|---|---|---|---|---|---|---|---|---|---|
| Henrik Lundqvist | 25 | 25 | 1516 | 13 | 11 | 54 | 2.14 | 737 | .927 | 1 | 0 | 1 | 0 |
| Cam Talbot | 2 | 0 | 46 | 0 | 1 | 2 | 2.61 | 13 | .846 | 0 | 0 | 0 | 0 |

^{†}Denotes player spent time with another team before joining the Rangers. Stats reflect time with the Rangers only.
^{‡}Denotes player was traded mid-season. Stats reflect time with the Rangers only.
Bold/italics denotes franchise record.

== Awards and records ==
=== Awards ===
Regular season
| Player | Award | Date |
|---|---|---|
| Henrik Lundqvist | NHL Third Star of the Week | January 13, 2014 |
| Henrik Lundqvist | NHL Second Star of the Week | March 24, 2014 |
| Mats Zuccarello | Steven McDonald Extra Effort Award | April 8, 2014 |
| Dominic Moore | Bill Masterton Memorial Trophy | June 24, 2014 |

=== Milestones ===
Regular season
| Player | Milestone | Reached |
|---|---|---|
| Jesper Fast | 1st career NHL game | October 3, 2013 |
| John Moore | 100th career NHL game | October 3, 2013 |
| Anton Stralman | 100th career NHL point | October 8, 2013 |
| Cam Talbot | 1st career NHL game | October 24, 2013 |
| Benoit Pouliot | 300th career NHL game | October 26, 2013 |
| Cam Talbot | 1st career NHL win | October 26, 2013 |
| Dan Girardi | 500th career NHL game | October 31, 2013 |
| Marc Staal | 400th career NHL game | October 31, 2013 |
| Marc Staal | 100th career NHL point | November 12, 2013 |
| Cam Talbot | 1st career NHL shutout | November 16, 2013 |
| Derek Dorsett | 300th career NHL game | November 17, 2013 |
| Dylan McIlrath | 1st career NHL game | December 12, 2013 |
| Derek Stepan | 100th career NHL assist | December 15, 2013 |
| Mats Zuccarello | 100th career NHL game | December 15, 2013 |
| Conor Allen | 1st career NHL game | December 29, 2013 |
| New York Rangers (franchise) | 6,000th game | February 6, 2014 |
| Henrik Lundqvist | 300th career NHL win | March 9, 2014 |
| Dominic Moore | 200th career NHL point | March 9, 2014 |
| Carl Hagelin | 1st career NHL hat-trick | March 14, 2014 |
| Henrik Lundqvist | 50th career NHL shutout | March 22, 2014 |
| Derick Brassard | 400th career NHL game | April 5, 2014 |
| Dominic Moore | 600th career NHL game | April 5, 2014 |

Playoffs
| Player | Milestone | Reached |
|---|---|---|
| Jesper Fast | 1st career NHL playoff game 1st career NHL playoff assist 1st career NHL playoff point | April 17, 2014 |
| J. T. Miller | 1st career NHL playoff game 1st career NHL playoff assist 1st career NHL playoff point | April 27, 2014 |
| Cam Talbot | 1st career NHL playoff game | April 29, 2014 |
| Henrik Lundqvist | 1st career NHL playoff assist 1st career NHL playoff point | May 25, 2014 |

=== Records ===
Regular season
| Player | Record | Reached |
|---|---|---|
| Henrik Lundqvist | New York Rangers all-time wins leader (302 wins) | March 18, 2014 |
| Henrik Lundqvist | New York Rangers all-time shutout leader (50 shutouts) | March 22, 2014 |

Playoffs
| Player | Record | Reached |
|---|---|---|
| Henrik Lundqvist | New York Rangers all-time playoff wins leader (42 wins) | May 29, 2014 |

== Transactions ==
The Rangers were involved in the following transactions during the 2013–14 season:

=== Trades ===
| June 30, 2013 | To Minnesota Wild: Benn Ferriero; CBJ's 6th-round pick in 2014 | To New York Rangers: Justin Falk |
| July 1, 2013 | To Philadelphia Flyers: Kris Newbury | To New York Rangers: Danny Syvret |
| July 2, 2013 | To Montreal Canadiens: Christian Thomas | To New York Rangers: Danny Kristo |
| December 6, 2013 | To Chicago Blackhawks: Brandon Mashinter | To New York Rangers: Kyle Beach |
| January 4, 2014 | To Los Angeles Kings: Conditional 7th-round pick in 2014 | To New York Rangers: Daniel Carcillo |
| January 22, 2014 | To Nashville Predators: Michael Del Zotto | To New York Rangers: Kevin Klein |
| March 5, 2014 | To Tampa Bay Lightning: Ryan Callahan; Conditional 2nd-round pick in 2014; 1st-round pick in 2015; Conditional 7th-round pick in 2015 | To New York Rangers: Martin St. Louis; Conditional 2nd-round pick in 2015 |
| March 5, 2014 | To Vancouver Canucks: 5th-round pick in 2015 | To New York Rangers: Raphael Diaz |

=== Free agents acquired ===
| Player | Former team | Contract terms |
|---|---|---|
| Dominic Moore | San Jose Sharks | 1 year, $1 million |
| Aaron Johnson | Boston Bruins | 1 year, $600,000 |
| Benoit Pouliot | Tampa Bay Lightning | 1 year, $1.3 million |
| Troy Donnay | Erie Otters | 3 years, $2.15 million entry-level contract |
| David LeNeveu | Hartford Wolf Pack | 1 year, $550,000 |
| Ryan Haggerty | RPI | 3 years, $2.775 million entry-level contract |
| Chris McCarthy | University of Vermont | 2 years, $1.385 million entry-level contract |
| Mathew Bodie | Union College | 1 year, $925,000 entry-level contract |
| Petr Zamorsky | PSG Zlín | 2 years, $1.85 million |

=== Free agents lost ===
| Player | New team | Contract terms |
|---|---|---|
| Ryan Clowe | New Jersey Devils | 5 years, $24.25 million |
| Matt Gilroy | Florida Panthers | 1 year, $700,000 |
| Steve Eminger | Admiral Vladivostok | undisclosed |

=== Claimed via waivers ===
| Player | Previous team | Date |

=== Lost via waivers ===
| Player | New team | Date |
|---|---|---|
| Taylor Pyatt | Pittsburgh Penguins | January 2, 2014 |

=== Lost via retirement ===
Player
Martin Biron

=== Player signings ===
| Player | Date | Contract terms |
|---|---|---|
| Ryan McDonagh | July 8, 2013 | 6 years, $28.2 million |
| Carl Hagelin | July 10, 2013 | 2 years, $4.5 million |
| Justin Falk | July 10, 2013 | 1 year, $975,000 |
| Mats Zuccarello | July 30, 2013 | 1 year, $1.15 million |
| Brandon Mashinter | August 7, 2013 | 1 year, $605,000 |
| Derek Stepan | September 26, 2013 | 2 years, $6.15 million |
| Henrik Lundqvist | November 4, 2013 | 7 years, $59.5 million contract extension |
| Anthony Duclair | January 2, 2014 | 3 years, $2.46 million entry-level contract |
| Dan Girardi | February 28, 2014 | 6 years, $33 million contract extension |
| Ryan Graves | March 17, 2014 | 3 years, $1.98 million entry-level contract |
| Mackenzie Skapski | June 2, 2014 | 3 years, $2.4 million entry-level contract |
| Calle Andersson | June 2, 2014 | 3 years, $1.985 million entry-level contract |

== Draft picks ==
New York Rangers' picks at the 2013 NHL entry draft, which was held in Newark, New Jersey, on June 30, 2013.

| Round | # | Player | Pos | Nationality | College/junior/club team (league) |
|---|---|---|---|---|---|
| 3 | 65^{[a]} | Adam Tambellini | C | Canada | Surrey Eagles (BCHL) |
| 3 | 75^{[b]} | Pavel Buchnevich | LW | Russia | Severstal Cherepovets (KHL) |
| 3 | 80 | Anthony Duclair | LW | Canada | Quebec Remparts (QMJHL) |
| 4 | 110 | Ryan Graves | D | Canada | P.E.I. Rocket (QMJHL) |
| 6 | 170 | Mackenzie Skapski | G | Canada | Kootenay Ice (WHL) |

Draft notes

- The New York Rangers' first-round pick went to the Columbus Blue Jackets as the result of a July 23, 2012, trade that sent Rick Nash, Steven Delisle and a 2013 conditional third-round pick to the Rangers in exchange for Artem Anisimov, Brandon Dubinsky, Tim Erixon and this pick.
- The New York Rangers' second-round pick went to the San Jose Sharks as the result of an April 2, 2013, trade that sent Ryane Clowe to the Rangers in exchange for a 2013 third-round pick (previously acquired from Florida), a 2014 conditional round pick and this pick.
- ^{a} The Nashville Predators' third-round pick went to the New York Rangers as a result of a June 23, 2012, trade that sent a 2012 third-round pick (#89–Brendan Leipsic) to the Predators in exchange for this pick.
- ^{b} The Columbus Blue Jackets' third-round pick went to the New York Rangers as a result of a July 23, 2012, trade that sent Artem Anisimov, Brandon Dubinsky, Tim Erixon and a 2013 first-round pick to the Blue Jackets in exchange for Rick Nash, Steven Delisle and this pick.
- The New York Rangers' fifth-round pick went to the Nashville Predators as the result of a June 23, 2012, trade that sent a 2012 fifth-round pick (#142–Thomas Spelling) to the Rangers in exchange for this pick.
- The New York Rangers' seventh-round pick went to the Minnesota Wild as the result of a February 3, 2012, trade that sent Casey Wellman to the Rangers in exchange for Erik Christensen and this pick.
