= 2013–14 Philadelphia Flyers season =

NHL hockey team season

2013–14 Philadelphia Flyers
- Division: 3rd Metropolitan
- Conference: 6th Eastern
- 2013–14 record: 42–30–10
- Home record: 24–14–3
- Road record: 18–16–7
- Goals for: 236
- Goals against: 235

Team information
- General manager: Paul Holmgren
- Coach: Peter Laviolette (Oct.); Craig Berube (Oct.–Apr.)
- Captain: Claude Giroux
- Alternate captains: Scott Hartnell; Kimmo Timonen
- Arena: Wells Fargo Center
- Average attendance: 19,839 (101.5%)
- Minor league affiliates: Adirondack Phantoms; Greenville Road Warriors (Note: Affiliation was dissolved in late October.)

Team leaders
- Goals: Wayne Simmonds (29)
- Assists: Claude Giroux (58)
- Points: Claude Giroux (86)
- Penalty minutes: Zac Rinaldo (153)
- Plus/minus: Scott Hartnell (+11); Jakub Voracek (+11)
- Wins: Steve Mason (33)
- Goals against average: Steve Mason (2.50)

The 2013–14 Philadelphia Flyers season was the 47th season for the National Hockey League (NHL) franchise that was established on June 5, 1967.

== Off-season ==
The Flyers first major move of the off-season was trading for the negotiating rights to New York Islanders defenseman Mark Streit, an impending unrestricted free agent, for a fourth-round pick in the 2014 NHL entry draft and minor league forward Shane Harper. Streit signed a four-year, $21 million contract with the Flyers.

Following the 2012–13 NHL lockout each team was granted two compliance buyouts to be exercised after the 2012–13 season and/or after the 2013–14 season that would not count against the salary cap in any further year, regardless of the player's age. The Flyers used their two compliance buyouts on June 27, 2013, buying out centerman Danny Briere and goaltender Ilya Bryzgalov. Briere had two years and $5 million left on the eight-year, $52 million contract he signed with the Flyers on July 1, 2007. Bryzgalov had seven years and $34.5 million left on the nine-year, $51 million contract he signed with the Flyers on June 23, 2011.

The Flyers made two major signings in free agency. Former Tampa Bay Lightning centerman Vincent Lecavalier, who had been bought out by the team he spent his first 14 NHL seasons with, signed a five-year, $22.5 million contract on July 2, 2013. Former Flyers goaltender Ray Emery, who had spent the previous season with the Chicago Blackhawks, returned to Flyers by signing a one-year, $1.65 million contract on July 5. On the same day, the Flyers signed star center Claude Giroux to an eight-year contract extension worth $66.2 million.

== Regular season ==
After a second consecutive 0–3 start to the regular season, head coach Peter Laviolette and assistant coach Kevin McCarthy were fired on October 7. Assistant coach Craig Berube, who previously played for the Flyers and served two stints as head coach of the Flyers' AHL affiliate, the Philadelphia Phantoms, was named the new head coach while John Paddock and Ian Laperriere were announced as Berube's assistant coaches. Assistant coach Joe Mullen and goaltending coach Jeff Reese were also retained.

== Standings ==
Metropolitan Division
Pos	Team	GP	W	L	OTL	ROW	GF	GA	GD	Pts
1	y – Pittsburgh Penguins	82	51	24	7	44	249	207	+42	109
2	x – New York Rangers	82	45	31	6	41	218	193	+25	96
3	x – Philadelphia Flyers	82	42	30	10	39	236	235	+1	94
4	x – Columbus Blue Jackets	82	43	32	7	38	231	216	+15	93
5	Washington Capitals	82	38	30	14	28	235	240	−5	90
6	New Jersey Devils	82	35	29	18	35	197	208	−11	88
7	Carolina Hurricanes	82	36	35	11	34	207	230	−23	83
8	New York Islanders	82	34	37	11	25	225	267	−42	79

Source: National Hockey League
x – Clinched playoff spot; y – Clinched division

== Playoffs ==
The Philadelphia Flyers entered the playoffs as the Metropolitan Division's third seed. They faced the New York Rangers in the first round and lost the series 4 games to 3.

== Schedule and results ==
=== Preseason ===
2013 preseason
Preseason: 1–5–1 (home: 0–3–1; road: 1–2–0)

Game	Date	Visitor	Score	Home	OT	Decision	Attendance	Record	Recap
1^{[a]}	September 15	Toronto	4–3	Philadelphia		Stolarz	9,100	0–1–0	L
2	September 16	Washington	4–3	Philadelphia	SO	Emery	19,142	0–1–1	OTL
3	September 16	Philadelphia	3–2	Toronto	SO	Heeter	19,185	1–1–1	W
4	September 17	NY Rangers	3–2	Philadelphia		Mason	19,142	1–2–1	L
5	September 24	New Jersey	2–1	Philadelphia		Emery	19,360	1–3–1	L
6	September 26	Philadelphia	1–4	New Jersey		Mason	11,789	1–4–1	L
7	September 27	Philadelphia	3–6	Washington		Emery	17,121	1–5–1	L
Notes:^{a} Game played at Budweiser Gardens in London, Ontario.

Legend: W Win (2 points) L Loss (0 points) OTL Overtime/shootout loss (1 point)

=== Regular season ===
2013–14 regular season
October: 3–8–0 (home: 2–5–0; road: 1–3–0)

Game	Date	Visitor	Score	Home	OT	Decision	Attendance	Record	Points	Recap
1	October 2	Toronto	3–1	Philadelphia		Mason	19,872	0–1–0	0	L
2	October 5	Philadelphia	1–4	Montreal		Emery	21,273	0–2–0	0	L
3	October 6	Philadelphia	1–2	Carolina		Mason	16,088	0–3–0	0	L
4	October 8	Florida	1–2	Philadelphia		Mason	19,589	1–3–0	2	W
5	October 11	Phoenix	2–1	Philadelphia		Mason	19,713	1–4–0	2	L
6	October 12	Philadelphia	2–5	Detroit		Emery	20,066	1–5–0	2	L
7	October 15	Vancouver	3–2	Philadelphia		Mason	19,588	1–6–0	2	L
8	October 17	Pittsburgh	4–1	Philadelphia		Mason	19,735	1–7–0	2	L
9	October 24	NY Rangers	1–2	Philadelphia		Mason	19,768	2–7–0	4	W
10	October 26	Philadelphia	5–2	NY Islanders		Mason	13,620	3–7–0	6	W
11	October 29	Anaheim	3–2	Philadelphia		Mason	19,615	3–8–0	6	L

November: 9–4–2 (home: 5–2–0; road: 4–2–2)

Game	Date	Visitor	Score	Home	OT	Decision	Attendance	Record	Points	Recap
12	November 1	Washington	7–0	Philadelphia		Mason	19,702	3–9–0	6	L
13	November 2	Philadelphia	1–0	New Jersey		Emery	13,705	4–9–0	8	W
14	November 5	Philadelphia	1–2	Carolina	OT	Mason	15,519	4–9–1	9	OTL
15	November 7	New Jersey	3–0	Philadelphia		Emery	19,604	4–10–1	9	L
16	November 9	Edmonton	2–4	Philadelphia		Mason	19,725	5–10–1	11	W
17	November 12	Philadelphia	5–0	Ottawa		Mason	16,398	6–10–1	13	W
18	November 13	Philadelphia	2–1	Pittsburgh		Emery	18,656	7–10–1	15	W
19	November 15	Philadelphia	2–3	Winnipeg	SO	Mason	15,004	7–10–2	16	OTL
20	November 19	Ottawa	2–5	Philadelphia		Mason	19,724	8–10–2	18	W
21	November 21	Buffalo	1–4	Philadelphia		Emery	19,973	9–10–2	20	W
22	November 23	NY Islanders	2–5	Philadelphia		Mason	19,829	10–10–2	22	W
23	November 25	Philadelphia	1–3	Florida		Mason	14,299	10–11–2	22	L
24	November 27	Philadelphia	2–4	Tampa Bay		Emery	18,427	10–12–2	22	L
25	November 29	Winnipeg	1–2	Philadelphia		Mason	19,937	11–12–2	24	W
26	November 30	Philadelphia	3–2	Nashville	SO	Mason	17,136	12–12–2	26	W

December: 8–4–2 (home: 4–0–0; road: 4–4–2)

Game	Date	Visitor	Score	Home	OT	Decision	Attendance	Record	Points	Recap
27	December 2	Philadelphia	0–2	Minnesota		Emery	17,676	12–13–2	26	L
28	December 4	Philadelphia	6–3	Detroit		Mason	20,066	13–13–2	28	W
29	December 7	Philadelphia	1–5	Dallas		Mason	8,567	13–14–2	28	L
30	December 9	Philadelphia	4–5	Ottawa	SO	Mason	15,786	13–14–3	29	OTL
31	December 11	Philadelphia	2–7	Chicago		Emery	21,144	13–15–3	29	L
32	December 12	Montreal	1–2	Philadelphia		Mason	19,748	14–15–3	31	W
33	December 15	Philadelphia	4–5	Washington	SO	Mason	18,506	14–15–4	32	OTL
34	December 17	Washington	2–5	Philadelphia		Mason	19,788	15–15–4	34	W
35	December 19	Columbus	4–5	Philadelphia		Mason	19,852	16–15–4	36	W
36	December 21	Philadelphia	3–6	Columbus		Emery	14,090	16–16–4	36	L
37	December 23	Minnesota	1–4	Philadelphia		Mason	19,872	17–16–4	38	W
38	December 28	Philadelphia	4–3	Edmonton	SO	Mason	16,839	18–16–4	40	W
39	December 30	Philadelphia	4–3	Vancouver	SO	Mason	18,910	19–16–4	42	W
40	December 31	Philadelphia	4–1	Calgary		Emery	19,289	20–16–4	44	W

January: 6–7–2 (home: 3–3–1; road: 3–4–1)

Game	Date	Visitor	Score	Home	OT	Decision	Attendance	Record	Points	Recap
41	January 2	Philadelphia	1–2	Colorado		Mason	16,793	20–17–4	44	L
42	January 4	Philadelphia	5–3	Phoenix		Mason	14,875	21–17–4	46	W
43	January 7	Philadelphia	3–2	New Jersey	OT	Emery	14,521	22–17–4	48	W
44	January 8	Montreal	1–3	Philadelphia		Mason	19,949	23–17–4	50	W
45	January 11	Tampa Bay	6–3	Philadelphia		Mason	19,987	23–18–4	50	L
46	January 12	Philadelphia	1–4	NY Rangers		Emery	18,006	23–19–4	50	L
47	January 14	Philadelphia	4–3	Buffalo		Mason	18,667	24–19–4	52	W
48	January 16	Nashville	4–3	Philadelphia	SO	Mason	19,917	24–19–5	53	OTL
49	January 18	NY Islanders	4–6	Philadelphia		Emery	19,992	25–19–5	55	W
50	January 20	Philadelphia	3–4	NY Islanders	SO	Emery	16,048	25–19–6	56	OTL
–	January 21	Carolina		Philadelphia	Game rescheduled to January 22 due to a snowstorm in Philadelphia.					
51	January 22	Carolina	3–2	Philadelphia		Mason	19,592	25–20–6	56	L
52	January 23	Philadelphia	2–5	Columbus		Emery	15,571	25–21–6	56	L
53	January 25	Boston	6–1	Philadelphia		Mason	19,938	25–22–6	56	L
54	January 28	Detroit	0–5	Philadelphia		Mason	19,987	26–22–6	58	W
55	January 30	Philadelphia	3–5	Anaheim		Mason	16,007	26–23–6	58	L

February: 4–1–0 (home: 2–1–0; road: 2–0–0)

Game	Date	Visitor	Score	Home	OT	Decision	Attendance	Record	Points	Recap
56	February 1	Philadelphia	2–0	Los Angeles		Mason	18,118	27–23–6	60	W
57	February 3	Philadelphia	5–2	San Jose		Mason	17,562	28–23–6	62	W
58	February 6	Colorado	1–3	Philadelphia		Mason	19,982	29–23–6	64	W
59	February 8	Calgary	1–2	Philadelphia		Emery	19,874	30–23–6	66	W
60	February 27	San Jose	7–3	Philadelphia		Mason	19,879	30–24–6	66	L

March: 9–3–2 (home: 7–2–1; road: 2–1–1)

Game	Date	Visitor	Score	Home	OT	Decision	Attendance	Record	Points	Recap
61	March 1	NY Rangers	2–4	Philadelphia		Mason	19,988	31–24–6	68	W
62	March 2	Philadelphia	5–4	Washington	OT	Mason	18,506	32–24–6	70	W
63	March 5	Washington	4–6	Philadelphia		Mason	19,919	33–24–6	72	W
64	March 8	Philadelphia	3–4	Toronto	OT	Mason	19,583	33–24–7	73	OTL
65	March 11	New Jersey	2–1	Philadelphia		Mason	19,967	33–25–7	73	L
66	March 15	Pittsburgh	0–4	Philadelphia		Mason	19,993	34–25–7	75	W
67	March 16	Philadelphia	4–3	Pittsburgh		Mason	18,647	35–25–7	77	W
68	March 18	Chicago	2–3	Philadelphia	OT	Emery	19,932	36–25–7	79	W
69	March 20	Dallas	2–4	Philadelphia		Mason	19,831	37–25–7	81	W
70	March 22	St. Louis	1–4	Philadelphia		Mason	19,942	38–25–7	83	W
71	March 24	Los Angeles	3–2	Philadelphia		Emery	19,876	38–26–7	83	L
72	March 26	Philadelphia	1–3	NY Rangers		Mason	18,006	38–26–7	83	L
73	March 28	Toronto	2–4	Philadelphia		Mason	19,963	39–27–7	85	W
74	March 30	Boston	4–3	Philadelphia	SO	Mason	19,958	39–27–8	86	OTL

April: 3–3–2 (home: 1–1–1; road: 2–2–1)

Game	Date	Visitor	Score	Home	OT	Decision	Attendance	Record	Points	Recap
75	April 1	Philadelphia	0–1	St. Louis	SO	Emery	18,647	39–27–9	87	OTL
76	April 3	Columbus	2–0	Philadelphia		Mason	19,981	39–28–9	87	L
77	April 5	Philadelphia	2–5	Boston		Emery	17,565	39–29–9	87	L
78	April 6	Buffalo	2–5	Philadelphia		Mason	19,603	40–29–9	89	W
79	April 8	Philadelphia	5–2	Florida		Mason	12,487	41–29–9	91	W
80	April 10	Philadelphia	2–4	Tampa Bay		Emery	19,204	41–30–9	91	L
81	April 12	Philadelphia	4–3	Pittsburgh	OT	Emery	18,673	42–30–9	93	W
82	April 13	Carolina	6–5	Philadelphia	SO	Heeter	19,727	42–30–10	94	OTL

Legend: W Win (2 points) L Loss (0 points) OTL Overtime/shootout loss (1 point)

=== Playoffs ===
2014 Stanley Cup playoffs
Eastern Conference First Round vs. (M2) New York Rangers: New York won 4–3

Game	Date	Visitor	Score	Home	OT	Decision	Attendance	Series	Recap
1	April 17	Philadelphia	1–4	NY Rangers		Emery	18,006	0–1	L
2	April 20	Philadelphia	4–2	NY Rangers		Emery	18,006	1–1	W
3	April 22	NY Rangers	4–1	Philadelphia		Emery	20,096	1–2	L
4	April 25	NY Rangers	1–2	Philadelphia		Mason	20,132	2–2	W
5	April 27	Philadelphia	2–4	NY Rangers		Mason	18,006	2–3	L
6	April 29	NY Rangers	2–5	Philadelphia		Mason	20,137	3–3	W
7	April 30	Philadelphia	1–2	NY Rangers		Mason	18,006	3–4	L

Legend: W Win L Loss

== Player statistics ==
=== Scoring ===
- Position abbreviations: C = Center; D = Defense; G = Goaltender; LW = Left wing; RW = Right wing
- † = Joined team via a transaction (e.g., trade, waivers, signing) during the season. Stats reflect time with the Flyers only.
- ‡ = Left team via a transaction (e.g., trade, waivers, release) during the season. Stats reflect time with the Flyers only.

No.	Player	Pos	Regular season						Playoffs					
No.	Player	Pos	GP	G	A	Pts	+/-	PIM	GP	G	A	Pts	+/-	PIM
28	Claude Giroux	C	82	28	58	86	7	46	7	2	4	6	2	2
93	Jakub Voracek	RW	82	23	39	62	11	22	7	2	2	4	−1	4
17	Wayne Simmonds	RW	82	29	31	60	−4	106	7	4	1	5	−2	20
19	Scott Hartnell	LW	78	20	32	52	11	103	7	0	3	3	0	6
32	Mark Streit	D	82	10	34	44	3	44	7	1	2	3	0	0
10	Brayden Schenn	C	82	20	21	41	0	54	7	0	3	3	−2	8
24	Matt Read	RW	75	22	18	40	−4	16	7	1	2	3	−3	4
14	Sean Couturier	C	82	13	26	39	1	45	7	0	0	0	−3	6
40	Vincent Lecavalier	C	69	20	17	37	−16	44	7	1	1	2	−5	2
44	Kimmo Timonen	D	77	6	29	35	5	32	7	0	1	1	−2	4
12	Michael Raffl	LW	68	9	13	22	2	28	7	0	1	1	−1	0
5	Braydon Coburn	D	82	5	12	17	−6	63	7	0	3	3	−6	4
41	Andrej Meszaros‡	D	38	5	12	17	1	34	—	—	—	—	—	—
9	Steve Downie†	RW	51	3	14	17	−3	70	—	—	—	—	—	—
8	Nicklas Grossmann	D	78	1	13	14	−6	55	4	0	0	0	0	2
22	Luke Schenn	D	79	4	8	12	0	58	7	1	0	1	1	0
26	Erik Gustafsson	D	31	2	8	10	7	6	2	1	0	1	0	2
18	Adam Hall	RW	80	4	5	9	−15	23	7	0	1	1	0	7
15	Tye McGinn	LW	18	4	1	5	−1	4	—	—	—	—	—	—
36	Zac Rinaldo	C	67	2	2	4	−13	153	7	0	0	0	−2	4
47	Andrew MacDonald†	D	19	0	4	4	−3	16	7	1	1	2	−2	8
37	Jay Rosehill	LW	34	2	0	2	−8	90	—	—	—	—	—	—
25	Maxime Talbot‡	C	11	1	1	2	1	2	—	—	—	—	—	—
42	Jason Akeson	RW	1	0	1	1	1	0	7	2	1	3	−2	4
35	Steve Mason	G	61	0	1	1		10	5	0	0	0		0
45	Kris Newbury	C	4	0	1	1	0	7	—	—	—	—	—	—
76	Chris VandeVelde	C	18	0	1	1	−3	6	—	—	—	—	—	—
29	Ray Emery	G	28	0	0	0		31	3	0	0	0		0
75	Hal Gill	D	6	0	0	0	0	2	1	0	0	0	−2	0
33	Cal Heeter	G	1	0	0	0		0	—	—	—	—	—	—

=== Goaltending ===
No.	Player	Regular season											Playoffs									
No.	Player	GP	GS	W	L	OT	SA	GA	GAA	SV%	SO	TOI	GP	GS	W	L	SA	GA	GAA	SV%	SO	TOI
35	Steve Mason	61	60	33	18	7	1751	145	2.50	.917	4	3,486	5	4	2	2	131	8	1.97	.939	0	244
29	Ray Emery	28	21	9	12	2	711	69	2.96	.903	2	1,398	3	3	1	2	89	10	3.49	.888	0	172
33	Cal Heeter	1	1	0	0	1	38	5	4.69	.868	0	64	—	—	—	—	—	—	—	—	—	—

== Awards and records ==
=== Awards ===
Type	Award/honor	Recipient	Ref
League (annual)	Lester Patrick Trophy	Paul Holmgren	
League (in-season)	NHL Third Star of the Month	Claude Giroux (March)	
Team	Barry Ashbee Trophy	Kimmo Timonen	
Team	Bobby Clarke Trophy	Claude Giroux	
Team	Gene Hart Memorial Award	Steve Mason	
Team	Pelle Lindbergh Memorial Trophy	Michael Raffl	
Team	Toyota Cup	Claude Giroux	
Team	Yanick Dupre Memorial Class Guy Award	Jakub Voracek	

=== Records ===
Among the team records set during the 2013–14 season was Claude Giroux scoring four points during the third period on December 19, tying the team record.

=== Milestones ===
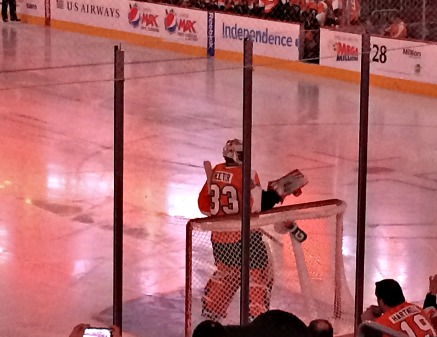
Cal Heeter made his NHL debut on April 13, 2014.

Milestone	Player	Date	Ref
First game	Michael Raffl	October 12, 2013	
First game	Cal Heeter	April 13, 2014	

== Transactions ==
The Flyers were involved in the following transactions from June 25, 2013, the day after the deciding game of the 2013 Stanley Cup Final, through June 13, 2014, the day of the deciding game of the 2014 Stanley Cup Final.

=== Trades ===
Date	Details		Ref
July 1, 2013	To New York Rangers: Danny Syvret	To Philadelphia Flyers: Kris Newbury	
October 31, 2013	To Colorado Avalanche: Maxime Talbot	To Philadelphia Flyers: Steve Downie	
March 4, 2014	To New York Islanders: Matt Mangene; 2nd-round pick in 2015; 3rd-round pick in 2014	To Philadelphia Flyers: Andrew MacDonald	
March 5, 2014	To Boston Bruins: Andrej Meszaros (Note: The Flyers retained half of Meszaros' $4 million cap hit.)	To Philadelphia Flyers: Conditional 3rd-round pick in 2014 (Note: The 3rd-round pick would have upgraded to a 2nd-round pick if the Bruins reached the Eastern Conference Finals and Meszaros played in at least 2/3 of their 2014 Stanley Cup playoff games, or if Meszaros re-signed with the Bruins before the 2014 NHL Entry Draft. Neither condition was met and the draft pick remained a 3rd-rounder. If Meszaros re-signed with the Bruins for the 2014–15 season after the draft began the Flyers would have received an additional 2015 4th-round pick, but Meszaros signed with the Buffalo Sabres on July 1, 2014.)	

=== Players acquired ===
Date	Player	Former team	Term	Via	Ref
July 2, 2013	Vincent Lecavalier	Tampa Bay Lightning	5-year	Free agency	
July 5, 2013	Yann Danis	Edmonton Oilers	1-year	Free agency	
July 5, 2013	Ray Emery	Chicago Blackhawks	1-year	Free agency	
October 1, 2013	Hal Gill	Nashville Predators	1-year	Free agency	
December 12, 2013	Chris VandeVelde	Adirondack Phantoms (AHL)	1-year	Free agency	
June 11, 2014	Pierre-Edouard Bellemare	Skelleftea AIK (SHL)	1-year	Free agency	

=== Players lost ===
Date	Player	New team	Via (Note: In parentheses is the player's free agency group on July 5 if applicable.)	Ref
June 27, 2013	Danny Briere	Montreal Canadiens (Note: Briere signed with Montreal on July 4.)	Compliance buyout	
June 27, 2013	Ilya Bryzgalov	Edmonton Oilers (Note: Bryzgalov signed with Edmonton on November 8.)	Compliance buyout	
July 2, 2013	Ruslan Fedotenko	HC Donbass (KHL)	Free agency (III)	
July 5, 2013	Simon Gagne (Note: Gagne was inactive during the 2013–14 season.)		Contract expiration (III)	
July 5, 2013	Mike Knuble (Note: Knuble retired.)		Contract expiration (III)	
July 5, 2013	Matt Walker (Note: Walker retired.)		Contract expiration (III)	
July 13, 2013	Brian Boucher	EV Zug (NLA)	Free agency (III)	
July 30, 2013	Kurtis Foster	Medvescak Zagreb (KHL)	Free agency (III)	
August 5, 2013	Mitch Wahl	EC Red Bull Salzburg (EBEL)	Free agency (UFA)	
August 9, 2013	Jody Shelley		Retirement (III)	
October 22, 2013	Blake Kessel	Bakersfield Condors (ECHL)	Free agency (UFA)	
November 4, 2013	Kent Huskins	Utica Comets (AHL)	Free agency (III)	
May 16, 2014	Erik Gustafsson	Avangard Omsk (KHL)	Free agency (Note: Philadelphia retained Gustafsson’s NHL rights through the 2015–16 season.)	
May 29, 2014	Eric Wellwood		Retirement (Note: Wellwood last played during 2012–13 season.)	

=== Signings ===
Date	Player	Term	Contract type	Ref
June 28, 2013	Mark Streit	4-year	Re-signing	
July 4, 2013	Adam Hall	1-year	Re-signing	
July 5, 2013	Claude Giroux	8-year	Extension	
July 9, 2013	Erik Gustafsson	1-year	Re-signing	
July 10, 2013	Oliver Lauridsen	2-year	Re-signing	
July 20, 2013	Sean Couturier	2-year	Extension	
August 29, 2013	Brandon Manning	1-year	Re-signing	
September 9, 2013	Taylor Leier	3-year	Entry-level	
September 17, 2013	Samuel Morin	3-year	Entry-level	
September 20, 2013	Matt Read	4-year	Extension	
January 18, 2014	Steve Mason	3-year	Extension	
March 21, 2014	Robert Hagg	3-year	Entry-level	
March 22, 2014	Michael Raffl	2-year	Extension	
April 15, 2014	Shayne Gostisbehere	3-year	Entry-level	
April 15, 2014	Andrew MacDonald	6-year	Extension	
June 13, 2014	Kimmo Timonen	1-year	Extension	

== Draft picks ==
Philadelphia Flyers' picks at the 2013 NHL entry draft, which was held at the Prudential Center in Newark, New Jersey on June 30, 2013. The Flyers traded their fourth-round pick to the Tampa Bay Lightning along with Jon Kalinski and a 2012 second-round pick for Pavel Kubina on February 18, 2012.

Round	Pick	Player	Position	Nationality	Team (league)
1	11	Samuel Morin	Defense	Canada	Rimouski Oceanic (QMJHL)
2	41	Robert Hagg	Defense	Sweden	MODO (SEL)
3	72	Tyrell Goulbourne	Left wing	Canada	Kelowna Rockets (WHL)
5	132	Terrance Amorosa	Defense	Canada	Holderness Bulls (USHS-NH)
6	162	Merrick Madsen	Goaltender	United States	Proctor Academy (USHS-NH)
7	192	David Drake	Defense	United States	Des Moines Buccaneers (USHL)

== Farm teams ==
American Hockey League – Adirondack Phantoms
ECHL – Greenville Road Warriors (affiliation dissolved one month into season)
