= 2013–14 NHL season =

National Hockey League season

- League: National Hockey League
- Sport: Ice hockey
- Duration: October 1, 2013 – June 13, 2014
- Games: 82
- Teams: 30
- TV partner(s): CBC, TSN, RDS (Canada); NBCSN, NBC, CNBC (United States)

Draft
- Top draft pick: Nathan MacKinnon
- Picked by: Colorado Avalanche

Regular season
- Presidents' Trophy: Boston Bruins
- Season MVP: Sidney Crosby (Penguins)
- Top scorer: Sidney Crosby (Penguins)

Playoffs
- Playoffs MVP: Justin Williams (Kings)

Stanley Cup
- Champions: Los Angeles Kings
- Runners-up: New York Rangers

NHL seasons
- 2012–13 2014–15

The 2013–14 NHL season was the 97th season of operation (96th season of play) of the National Hockey League (NHL). This season features a realignment of the league's 30 teams from a six to a four division format. The regular season began October 1, and concluded April 13. The Stanley Cup playoffs began April 16.

The Los Angeles Kings won their second Stanley Cup championship in franchise history (second in three seasons), defeating the New York Rangers four games to one in the 2014 Stanley Cup Final.

== League business ==
=== Realignment ===
The relocation of the former Atlanta Thrashers franchise to the current Winnipeg Jets in 2011 prompted the league to discuss realignment. On December 5, 2011, the NHL Board of Governors approved a conference realignment plan that would eliminate the current six-division setup and move into a four-conference structure from the 2012–13 season. Under the plan, which was designed to better accommodate the effects of time zone differences, each team would have played 50 or 54 intra-conference games, depending on whether it was in a seven- or eight-team conference, and two games (home and road) against each non-conference team. On January 6, 2012, the league announced that the NHLPA had rejected the proposed realignment, citing concerns about fairness, travel and the inability to see a draft schedule before approving, and that as a result, it would not implement the realignment until at least 2013–14.

Upon NHLPA rejection of the previous realignment, a new joint NHL-NHLPA plan was proposed in February 2013 as a modification of the previous plan with both the Columbus Blue Jackets and Detroit Red Wings moving to the East and the Winnipeg Jets moving to the West. This revised plan also adjusted the previously proposed four-conference system to a four-division/two-conference system, with the Eastern Conference consisting of two eight-team divisions, and the Western Conference consisting of two seven-team divisions. A new playoff format was also introduced to accommodate the new proposal, with the top three teams in each division making the playoffs, along with two wild-cards in each conference (for a total of 16 playoff teams). The NHLPA officially gave its consent to the NHL's proposed realignment plan on March 7, and then the NHL's board of governors approved the realignment and the new playoff format on March 14, to be implemented prior to the 2013–14 season. The league then announced the names of the divisions on July 19: the two eight-team divisions in the Eastern Conference would be the Atlantic Division and the Metropolitan Division, and the two seven-team divisions in the Western Conference would be the Central Division and the Pacific Division.

The new alignment was as follows:

Western Conference

Pacific Division	Central Division
Anaheim Ducks	Chicago Blackhawks
Calgary Flames	Colorado Avalanche
Edmonton Oilers	Dallas Stars
Los Angeles Kings	Minnesota Wild
Phoenix Coyotes	Nashville Predators
San Jose Sharks	St. Louis Blues
Vancouver Canucks	Winnipeg Jets

Eastern Conference

Atlantic Division	Metropolitan Division
Boston Bruins	Carolina Hurricanes
Buffalo Sabres	Columbus Blue Jackets
Detroit Red Wings	New Jersey Devils
Florida Panthers	New York Islanders
Montreal Canadiens	New York Rangers
Ottawa Senators	Philadelphia Flyers
Tampa Bay Lightning	Pittsburgh Penguins
Toronto Maple Leafs	Washington Capitals

=== Rule changes ===
- All players with fewer than 25 games of experience were required to wear visors. The additional minor penalty for instigating a fight when wearing a visor was removed. Players were now assessed an extra minor penalty for unsportsmanlike conduct should they remove their helmets prior to fighting.
- Jerseys which were not worn properly (such as being tucked in), and other equipment infractions would now result in a minor penalty.
- The base of the goal frame was now shallower and narrower by 4 inches. The overall width of the base of the frame was reduced from 96 to 88 inches and the depth of the base of the frame was reduced from 44 to 40 inches. Additionally, the corners where the goal post meets the crossbar were bent with a smaller radius, allowing more area across the goal plane. The size of the goal itself remains 6 feet wide and 4 feet tall.
- The attainable pass exception to the icing rule was removed. Officials would nullify a potential icing only if a player made contact with the puck.
- Goaltender's equipment was modified. Pads couldn't rise higher on the goaltender's leg than 45 percent of the distance between the center of the knee and pelvis. The pads could rise no higher than nine inches above the knee for goalies with an upper-leg measurement of 20 inches.
- A new hybrid icing rule was adopted. The hybrid icing rule required officials to stop play immediately in a potential icing situation where, in the judgment of the official, the defender would win a race to the puck ahead of an attacker, and the puck would cross the goal line. The official was to make his judgment when a player gains an imaginary line connecting the end-zone faceoff dots. Note that the first player to gain this imaginary line may not have been the one who would win a race to the puck.
- Rule 48: "Illegal Check to the Head" was clarified so that an illegal check to the head is classified as a hit where the opponent's head is the main point of contact when said contact was avoidable is not permitted.

=== Entry draft ===
The 2013 NHL entry draft was held on June 30, 2013, at the Prudential Center in Newark, New Jersey. Nathan MacKinnon was selected first overall by the Colorado Avalanche.

=== Uniforms ===
- The Dallas Stars debuted a new logo, featuring a star with the letter D on it, as well as redesigned uniforms. The green on the uniform was restored as the dominant color, using a brighter shade called "Victory Green," reminiscent of the team before their move to Dallas, thus making the colors easier to distinguish.
- The Nashville Predators add a slightly tapered gold stripe to the pants and they reverse the color pattern on their road socks. Previously, the color pattern matched that of the ends of the sleeves.
- The Anaheim Ducks introduced a replica of their inaugural 1993–94 jersey to wear in a regular season game against the Ottawa Senators on October 13.
- The Anaheim Ducks, Florida Panthers, and Boston Bruins were all wearing special patches to commemorate their first season in the NHL. The Ducks and Panthers were each wearing 20th season patches, and the Bruins were wearing 90th season patches. The Bruins' commemorative patch features six stars which signify the franchise's six Stanley Cup victories.
- The Carolina Hurricanes debuted a new uniform design that features different striping patterns on the home and away jerseys.
- The Toronto Maple Leafs and Detroit Red Wings wore specialized jerseys for the 2014 Winter Classic.
- The Los Angeles Kings and Pittsburgh Penguins retired their third jerseys.
- The San Jose Sharks modified their home and away jerseys.
- The Minnesota Wild changed their away jersey.
- The Buffalo Sabres added a new third jersey, featuring a gold front and navy back.
- The Calgary Flames retired their throwback third, and added a new third jersey partially inspired by Western wear.
- The New York Islanders, New York Rangers, Chicago Blackhawks, Pittsburgh Penguins, Los Angeles Kings and Anaheim Ducks each unveiled new jerseys featuring chromed logos for the 2014 Stadium Series.
- Although the New Jersey Devils also introduced a chromed version of their original red and green logo, they wore their red and green throwback jerseys unaltered (save for a Stadium Series patch) for their Stadium Series game against the Rangers.
- The Ottawa Senators and Vancouver Canucks wore specialized jerseys for the 2014 Heritage Classic. The Canucks reused the 1915 Vancouver Millionaires design from the previous season, while the Senators wore an off-white version of their black third jersey.

=== Arena changes ===
- The Ottawa Senators' home arena, Scotiabank Place, was renamed Canadian Tire Centre, as part of a new naming rights agreement with Canadian Tire.
- The San Jose Sharks' home arena, the HP Pavilion, was renamed the SAP Center as part of new naming rights agreement with SAP.

== Regular season ==
Coaching changes
Offseason
Team	2012–13 coach	2013–14 coach
Dallas Stars	Glen Gulutzan	Lindy Ruff
Edmonton Oilers	Ralph Krueger	Dallas Eakins
New York Rangers	John Tortorella	Alain Vigneault
Vancouver Canucks	Alain Vigneault	John Tortorella
Colorado Avalanche	Joe Sacco	Patrick Roy
In-season
Team	Outgoing coach	Incoming coach
Philadelphia Flyers	Peter Laviolette	Craig Berube
Buffalo Sabres	Ron Rolston	Ted Nolan
Florida Panthers	Kevin Dineen	Peter Horachek
Winnipeg Jets	Claude Noel	Paul Maurice

With realignment, a new scheduling format was introduced. Among the changes, the scheduling of inter-conference games ensured that all 30 teams would play in all 30 arenas at least once per season. Each team played 82 games – 50 or 54 games within their conference, depending on whether they were in a seven- or eight-team division, and two games (home and road) against each non-conference club. The regular season opened on October 1, 2013, with the first game seeing the Toronto Maple Leafs defeat the home team Montreal Canadiens by a score of 4–3.

The annual Christmas trade freeze was in effect from December 20, 2013, through December 26, 2013.

=== Olympics ===
There was no all-star game this season, due to the 2014 Winter Olympics in Sochi, Russia. Prior to the season, NHL, International Ice Hockey Federation (IIHF) and Olympic officials reached an agreement to send NHL players to the Olympics. The league took a break on February 9 and resumed play on February 25. All players participating in their respective national teams gathered in four U.S. airports and flew to Sochi on February 9 and 10.

=== Winter Classic ===
The 2014 NHL Winter Classic was held on January 1, 2014. The game, the sixth Winter Classic, featured the Toronto Maple Leafs and the Detroit Red Wings at Michigan Stadium at the University of Michigan in Ann Arbor, Michigan. The game was originally planned to be played on January 1, 2013, as the 2013 NHL Winter Classic, but was postponed due to the 2012–13 NHL lockout.

HBO once again produced a four-part documentary chronicling the preparation of the two teams for the Winter Classic as part of its sports series 24/7. The special also aired in Canada on Sportsnet.

=== Heritage Classic returns ===
The 2014 NHL Heritage Classic featured the Ottawa Senators facing off against the home team Vancouver Canucks at BC Place in Vancouver, British Columbia. This was third Heritage Classic game held in Canada following the Heritage Classic in 2011 when the Calgary Flames defeated the Montreal Canadiens 4–0 at McMahon Stadium in Calgary, Alberta. Unlike previous Heritage Classics, the 2014 event was technically held indoors; BC Place kept its retractable roof closed because of inclement weather.

=== Debut of the Stadium Series ===
On May 1, 2013, the NHL announced that the Chicago Blackhawks would host the Pittsburgh Penguins at Soldier Field in Chicago on March 1, 2014, as part of the new NHL Stadium Series. The NHL announced an unprecedented six outdoor NHL games for the 2013–14 season: one Winter Classic, four Stadium Series games, and a Heritage Classic game.

For the two Stadium Series games they were involved in at Yankee Stadium, the New York Rangers were the away team due to contract obligations with Madison Square Garden as they can't receive income from other venues in New York as the home team (this claim is dubious as Madison Square Garden owns the team and could theoretically waive that clause with its own team at any time).

The six outdoor games were:

Date	Site	Away team	Home team
January 1, 2014	Michigan Stadium, Ann Arbor, Michigan	Toronto Maple Leafs	Detroit Red Wings
January 25, 2014	Dodger Stadium, Los Angeles	Anaheim Ducks	Los Angeles Kings
January 26, 2014	Yankee Stadium, New York City	New York Rangers	New Jersey Devils
January 29, 2014	Yankee Stadium, New York City	New York Rangers	New York Islanders
March 1, 2014	Soldier Field, Chicago	Pittsburgh Penguins	Chicago Blackhawks
March 2, 2014	BC Place, Vancouver	Ottawa Senators	Vancouver Canucks

On November 18, 2013, the league announced NHL Revealed: A Season Like No Other, a new seven-part series showing behind-the-scenes footage of top NHL players during the season. The program followed multiple players as they competed in the regular season, the Stadium Series, the Heritage Classic, and the Sochi Olympics. Unlike 24/7, language by players and coaches would be censored. The program aired in the United States on the NBC Sports Network starting on January 22, and in Canada on CBC starting on January 23.

=== Postponed games ===
The Carolina Hurricanes-Buffalo Sabres game originally scheduled for January 7 was postponed due to the 2014 North American cold wave. It was rescheduled for February 25.

The Philadelphia Flyers postponed their game against the Hurricanes from January 21 to 22 due to the city of Philadelphia declaring a snow emergency. This resulted in the Hurricanes postponing their match with the Ottawa Senators from January 24 to 25 due to a rule stating that a team cannot play games on three consecutive days.

The Dallas Stars's March 10 game versus the Columbus Blue Jackets was overshadowed after Dallas player Rich Peverley, who had a history of heart problems, collapsed while on the players' bench midway through the first period, with Columbus leading 1–0 from a goal credited to Nathan Horton and assists credited to Matt Calvert and James Wisniewski. The game was abandoned at that point. This game was rescheduled for April 9. The game ran for 60 minutes, with Columbus leading 1–0 to start the game with the goals and assists listed above. All other statistics were expunged. In the rescheduled game, the Blue Jackets won 3–1. This mirrors the actions taken by the league during a game between the Detroit Red Wings and Nashville Predators on November 21, 2005.

== Standings ==
=== Eastern Conference ===
Top 3 (Metropolitan Division)
Pos	Team	GP	W	L	OTL	ROW	GF	GA	GD	Pts
1	y – Pittsburgh Penguins	82	51	24	7	44	249	207	+42	109
2	x – New York Rangers	82	45	31	6	41	218	193	+25	96
3	x – Philadelphia Flyers	82	42	30	10	39	236	235	+1	94

Source: National Hockey League
x – Clinched playoff spot; y – Clinched division

Top 3 (Atlantic Division)
Pos	Team	GP	W	L	OTL	ROW	GF	GA	GD	Pts
1	p – Boston Bruins	82	54	19	9	51	261	177	+84	117
2	x – Tampa Bay Lightning	82	46	27	9	38	240	215	+25	101
3	x – Montreal Canadiens	82	46	28	8	40	215	204	+11	100

Source: National Hockey League
p – Clinched Presidents' Trophy; x – Clinched playoff spot

Eastern Conference Wild Card
Pos	Div	Team	GP	W	L	OTL	ROW	GF	GA	GD	Pts
1	ME	x – Columbus Blue Jackets	82	43	32	7	38	231	216	+15	93
2	AT	x – Detroit Red Wings	82	39	28	15	34	222	230	−8	93
3	ME	Washington Capitals	82	38	30	14	28	235	240	−5	90
4	ME	New Jersey Devils	82	35	29	18	35	197	208	−11	88
5	AT	Ottawa Senators	82	37	31	14	30	236	265	−29	88
6	AT	Toronto Maple Leafs	82	38	36	8	29	231	256	−25	84
7	ME	Carolina Hurricanes	82	36	35	11	34	207	230	−23	83
8	ME	New York Islanders	82	34	37	11	25	225	267	−42	79
9	AT	Florida Panthers	82	29	45	8	21	196	268	−72	66
10	AT	Buffalo Sabres	82	21	51	10	14	157	248	−91	52

Source: National Hockey League
x – Clinched playoff spot

=== Western Conference ===
Top 3 (Central Division)
Pos	Team	GP	W	L	OTL	ROW	GF	GA	GD	Pts
1	y – Colorado Avalanche	82	52	22	8	47	250	220	+30	112
2	x – St. Louis Blues	82	52	23	7	43	248	191	+57	111
3	x – Chicago Blackhawks	82	46	21	15	40	267	220	+47	107

Source: National Hockey League
x – Clinched playoff spot; y – Clinched division

Top 3 (Pacific Division)
Pos	Team	GP	W	L	OTL	ROW	GF	GA	GD	Pts
1	y – Anaheim Ducks	82	54	20	8	51	266	209	+57	116
2	x – San Jose Sharks	82	51	22	9	41	249	200	+49	111
3	x – Los Angeles Kings	82	46	28	8	38	206	174	+32	100

Source: National Hockey League
x – Clinched playoff spot; y – Clinched division

Western Conference Wild Card
Pos	Div	Team	GP	W	L	OTL	ROW	GF	GA	GD	Pts
1	CE	x – Minnesota Wild	82	43	27	12	35	207	206	+1	98
2	CE	x – Dallas Stars	82	40	31	11	36	235	228	+7	91
3	PA	Phoenix Coyotes	82	37	30	15	31	216	231	−15	89
4	CE	Nashville Predators	82	38	32	12	36	216	242	−26	88
5	CE	Winnipeg Jets	82	37	35	10	29	227	237	−10	84
6	PA	Vancouver Canucks	82	36	35	11	31	196	223	−27	83
7	PA	Calgary Flames	82	35	40	7	28	209	241	−32	77
8	PA	Edmonton Oilers	82	29	44	9	25	203	270	−67	67

Source: National Hockey League
x – Clinched playoff spot

Tie Breakers:

1. Fewer number of games played.
2. Greater Regulation + OT Wins (ROW)
3. Greater number of points earned in head-to-head play. (If teams played an unequal # of head-to-head games, the result of the first game on the home ice of the team with the extra home game is discarded.)
- Columbus were given a higher wild card seed than Detroit due to a higher amount of ROW's (38 to 34)

== Player statistics ==
=== Scoring leaders ===
The following players led the league in regular season points.

Player	Team	GP	G	A	Pts	+/–	PIM
Sidney Crosby	Pittsburgh Penguins	80	36	68	104	+18	46
Ryan Getzlaf	Anaheim Ducks	77	31	56	87	+28	31
Claude Giroux	Philadelphia Flyers	82	28	58	86	+7	46
Tyler Seguin	Dallas Stars	80	37	47	84	+16	18
Corey Perry	Anaheim Ducks	81	43	39	82	+32	65
Phil Kessel	Toronto Maple Leafs	82	37	43	80	−5	27
Taylor Hall	Edmonton Oilers	75	27	53	80	−15	44
Alexander Ovechkin	Washington Capitals	78	51	28	79	−35	48
Joe Pavelski	San Jose Sharks	82	41	38	79	+23	32
Jamie Benn	Dallas Stars	81	34	45	79	+21	64

=== Leading goaltenders ===
The following goaltenders led the league in regular season goals against average while playing at least 1800 minutes.

Player	Team	GP	TOI	W	L	OTL	GA	SO	SV%	GAA
Cory Schneider	New Jersey Devils	45	2679:54	16	15	12	88	3	.921	1.97
Tuukka Rask	Boston Bruins	58	3386:27	36	15	6	115	7	.930	2.04
Jonathan Quick	Los Angeles Kings	49	2904:26	27	17	4	100	6	.915	2.07
Ben Bishop	Tampa Bay Lightning	63	3586:21	37	14	7	133	5	.924	2.23
Jaroslav Halak	St. Louis/Washington	52	2938:35	29	13	7	110	5	.921	2.25
Corey Crawford	Chicago Blackhawks	59	3395:01	32	16	10	128	2	.917	2.26
Anton Khudobin	Carolina Hurricanes	36	2084:18	19	14	1	80	1	.926	2.30
Carey Price	Montreal Canadiens	59	3464:22	34	20	5	134	6	.927	2.32
Henrik Lundqvist	New York Rangers	63	3655:19	33	24	5	144	5	.920	2.36
Marc-Andre Fleury	Pittsburgh Penguins	64	3792:24	39	18	5	150	5	.915	2.37

== Playoffs ==
=== Bracket ===
In each round, teams competed in a best-of-seven series following a 2–2–1–1–1 format (scores in the bracket indicate the number of games won in each best-of-seven series). The team with home ice advantage played at home for games one and two (and games five and seven, if necessary), and the other team was at home for games three and four (and game six, if necessary). The top three teams in each division made the playoffs, along with two wild cards in each conference, for a total of eight teams from each conference. The Wild Card seeded in the Western Conference is Central 1 vs Wild Card 1 and Pacific 1 vs Wild Card 2 in the and in Eastern Conference is Atlantc 1 vs Wild Card 1 and Metropolitan 1 vs Wild Card 2.

In the first round, the lower seeded wild card in each conference was played against the division winner with the best record while the other wild card was played against the other division winner, and both wild cards were de facto #4 seeds. The other series matched the second and third-place teams from the divisions. In the first two rounds, home ice advantage was awarded to the team with the better seed. In the conference finals and Stanley Cup Final, home ice advantage was awarded to the team with the better regular season record.

First round	Second round
A1	Boston	4
WC2	Detroit	1
A1	Boston	3
A3	Montreal	4
A2	Tampa Bay	0
A3	Montreal	4
Eastern Conference
M1	Pittsburgh	4
WC1	Columbus	2
M1	Pittsburgh	3
M2	NY Rangers	4
M2	NY Rangers	4
M3	Philadelphia	3
C1	Colorado	3
WC1	Minnesota	4
WC1	Minnesota	2
C3	Chicago	4
C2	St. Louis	2
C3	Chicago	4
Western Conference
P1	Anaheim	4
WC2	Dallas	2
P1	Anaheim	3
P3	Los Angeles	4
P2	San Jose	3
P3	Los Angeles	4

Conference finals
A3	Montreal	2
M2	NY Rangers	4
C3	Chicago	3
P3	Los Angeles	4

Stanley Cup Final
M2	NY Rangers	1
P3	Los Angeles	4

== NHL awards ==
Awards were presented at the NHL Awards ceremony in Las Vegas, Nevada on June 24, 2014. Finalists for voted awards were announced during the playoffs. Voting concluded immediately after the end of the regular season. The Presidents' Trophy, the Prince of Wales Trophy and Clarence S. Campbell Bowl were not presented at the awards ceremony.

2013–14 NHL awards
Award	Recipient(s)	Runner(s)-up/Finalists
Presidents' Trophy (Best regular-season record)	Boston Bruins	Anaheim Ducks
Prince of Wales Trophy (Eastern Conference playoff champion)	New York Rangers	Montreal Canadiens
Clarence S. Campbell Bowl (Western Conference playoff champion)	Los Angeles Kings	Chicago Blackhawks
Art Ross Trophy (Top scorer)	Sidney Crosby (Pittsburgh Penguins)	Ryan Getzlaf (Anaheim Ducks)
Bill Masterton Memorial Trophy (Perseverance, Sportsmanship, and Dedication)	Dominic Moore (New York Rangers)	Jaromir Jagr (New Jersey Devils); Manny Malhotra (Carolina Hurricanes)
Calder Memorial Trophy (Best first-year player)	Nathan MacKinnon (Colorado Avalanche)	Tyler Johnson (Tampa Bay Lightning); Ondrej Palat (Tampa Bay Lightning)
Conn Smythe Trophy (Most valuable player, playoffs)	Justin Williams (Los Angeles Kings)	Anze Kopitar (Los Angeles Kings)
Frank J. Selke Trophy (Defensive forward)	Patrice Bergeron (Boston Bruins)	Anze Kopitar (Los Angeles Kings); Jonathan Toews (Chicago Blackhawks)
Hart Memorial Trophy (Most valuable player, regular season)	Sidney Crosby (Pittsburgh Penguins)	Ryan Getzlaf (Anaheim Ducks); Claude Giroux (Philadelphia Flyers)
Jack Adams Award (Best coach)	Patrick Roy (Colorado Avalanche)	Mike Babcock (Detroit Red Wings); Jon Cooper (Tampa Bay Lightning)
James Norris Memorial Trophy (Best defenceman)	Duncan Keith (Chicago Blackhawks)	Zdeno Chara (Boston Bruins); Shea Weber (Nashville Predators)
King Clancy Memorial Trophy (Leadership and humanitarian contribution)	Andrew Ference (Edmonton Oilers)	Patrice Bergeron (Boston Bruins); Ryan Getzlaf (Anaheim Ducks)
Lady Byng Memorial Trophy (Sportsmanship and excellence)	Ryan O'Reilly (Colorado Avalanche)	Patrick Marleau (San Jose Sharks); Martin St. Louis (New York Rangers/Tampa Bay Lightning)
Ted Lindsay Award (Outstanding player)	Sidney Crosby (Pittsburgh Penguins)	Ryan Getzlaf (Anaheim Ducks); Claude Giroux (Philadelphia Flyers)
Mark Messier Leadership Award (Leadership and community activities)	Dustin Brown (Los Angeles Kings)	Ryan Getzlaf (Anaheim Ducks); Jonathan Toews (Chicago Blackhawks)
Maurice "Rocket" Richard Trophy (Top goal-scorer)	Alexander Ovechkin (Washington Capitals)	Corey Perry (Anaheim Ducks)
NHL Foundation Player Award (Award for community enrichment)	Patrice Bergeron (Boston Bruins)	Brent Burns (San Jose Sharks); Duncan Keith (Chicago Blackhawks)
NHL General Manager of the Year Award (Top general manager)	Bob Murray (Anaheim Ducks)	Marc Bergevin (Montreal Canadiens); Dean Lombardi (Los Angeles Kings)
Vezina Trophy (Best goaltender)	Tuukka Rask (Boston Bruins)	Ben Bishop (Tampa Bay Lightning); Semyon Varlamov (Colorado Avalanche)
William M. Jennings Trophy (Goaltender(s) of team with fewest goals against)	Jonathan Quick (Los Angeles Kings)	Tuukka Rask & Chad Johnson (Boston Bruins)

=== All-Star teams ===
Position	First Team	Second Team	Position	All-Rookie
G	Tuukka Rask, Boston Bruins	Semyon Varlamov, Colorado Avalanche	G	Frederik Andersen, Anaheim Ducks
D	Duncan Keith, Chicago Blackhawks	Shea Weber, Nashville Predators	D	Torey Krug, Boston Bruins
D	Zdeno Chara, Boston Bruins	Alex Pietrangelo, St. Louis Blues	D	Hampus Lindholm, Anaheim Ducks
C	Sidney Crosby, Pittsburgh Penguins	Ryan Getzlaf, Anaheim Ducks	F	Tyler Johnson, Tampa Bay Lightning
RW	Corey Perry, Anaheim Ducks	Alexander Ovechkin, Washington Capitals	F	Nathan MacKinnon, Colorado Avalanche
LW	Jamie Benn, Dallas Stars	Joe Pavelski, San Jose Sharks	F	Ondrej Palat, Tampa Bay Lightning

== Milestones ==
=== First games ===
The following is a list of notable players who played their first NHL game during the 2013–14 season, listed with their first team:

Player	Team	Notability
Frederik Andersen	Anaheim Ducks	Two-time William M. Jennings Trophy winner
Aleksander Barkov	Florida Panthers	Lady Byng Memorial Trophy winner, three-time Frank J. Selke Trophy winner, King Clancy Memorial Trophy winner
Mathew Dumba	Minnesota Wild	King Clancy Memorial Trophy winner
Johnny Gaudreau	Calgary Flames	Lady Byng Memorial Trophy winner, one-time NHL All-Star team selection
John Gibson	Anaheim Ducks	William M. Jennings Trophy winner in 2015–16 season
Seth Jones	Nashville Predators	One-time NHL All-Star team selection
Nikita Kucherov	Tampa Bay Lightning	Three-time Art Ross Trophy winner, two-time Ted Lindsay Award winner, two-time Hart Memorial Trophy winner, seven-time NHL All-Star team selection
Hampus Lindholm	Anaheim Ducks	One-time NHL All-Star team selection
Nathan MacKinnon	Colorado Avalanche	First overall pick in the 2013 draft, 2013–14 Calder Memorial Trophy winner, Hart Memorial Trophy winner, Ted Lindsay Award winner, Lady Byng Memorial Trophy winner, Maurice "Rocket" Richard Trophy winner, five-time NHL All-Star team selection, seven-time NHL All-Star, NHL All-Rookie Team selection
Sean Monahan	Calgary Flames	Bill Masterton Memorial Trophy winner
Antti Raanta	Chicago Blackhawks	William M. Jennings Trophy winner
Jacob Trouba	Winnipeg Jets	Mark Messier Leadership Award winner

=== Last games ===
The following is a list of players of note who played their last NHL game in 2013–14, listed with their team:

Player	Team	Notability
Daniel Alfredsson	Detroit Red Wings	Calder Memorial Trophy winner, 1-time NHL All-Star, King Clancy Memorial Trophy winner, over 1,200 games played
Todd Bertuzzi	Detroit Red Wings	1-time NHL All-Star, over 1,100 games played
Radek Dvorak	Carolina Hurricanes	Over 1,200 games played
Jean-Sebastien Giguere	Colorado Avalanche	Conn Smythe Trophy winner, the last active player to have been a member of the Hartford Whalers
Hal Gill	Philadelphia Flyers	Over 1,100 games played
Michal Handzus	Chicago Blackhawks	Over 1,000 games played
Josh Harding	Minnesota Wild	Bill Masterton Memorial Trophy winner
Ed Jovanovski	Florida Panthers	Over 1,100 games played
Nikolai Khabibulin	Chicago Blackhawks	Won 333 career games
Saku Koivu	Anaheim Ducks	Bill Masterton Trophy winner, over 1,100 games played
Derek Morris	Phoenix Coyotes	Over 1,100 games played
Teemu Selanne	Anaheim Ducks	4-time NHL All-Star, Bill Masterton Memorial Trophy winner, Calder Memorial Trophy winner, Maurice "Rocket" Richard Trophy winner, over 1,400 games played, oldest active player in NHL at time of retirement
Ryan Smyth	Edmonton Oilers	Over 1,200 games played
Tim Thomas	Dallas Stars	2-time Vezina Trophy winner; Conn Smythe Trophy winner; William M. Jennings Trophy winner; 2-time NHL All-Star
Ray Whitney	Dallas Stars	Over 1,300 games played

=== Major milestones reached ===
- On October 2, 2013, the Buffalo Sabres had four people under 20 years old (Mikhail Grigorenko, Zemgus Girgensons, Rasmus Ristolainen and Nikita Zadorov) on their active roster, the most on any NHL team's Opening Night roster since the 1995–96 season.
- On October 3, 2013, Boston Bruins forward Chris Kelly became the first player in NHL history to score a team's first goal of the season on a penalty shot against the Tampa Bay Lightning at TD Garden.
- On October 17, 2013, Edmonton Oilers forward Taylor Hall broke Wayne Gretzky's franchise record when he scored twice in eight seconds. Gretzky had held the franchise record for fastest two goals by one player since December 18, 1981, when he scored twice in nine seconds.
- On October 19, 2013, Phoenix Coyotes goaltender Mike Smith became the 11th goaltender in league history to score a goal when he scored against the Detroit Red Wings.
- On October 29, 2013, New Jersey Devils forward Jaromir Jagr scored his 119th career game-winning goal, surpassing Phil Esposito's 118 as the most game-winning goals since the 1967 NHL expansion.
- On November 19, 2013, Tampa Bay Lightning forward Martin St. Louis participated in his 1,000th NHL game.
- On December 18, 2013, New Jersey Devils forward Jaromir Jagr scored his 122nd career game-winning goal, the most in league history. Gordie Howe held that record dating back to the 1967 season.
- On December 31, 2013, Anaheim Ducks forward Andrew Cogliano became the 20th player in league history to play 500 consecutive games, and the fifth to do so to start his career.
- On February 1, 2014, Los Angeles Kings defenceman Robyn Regehr participated in his 1,000th NHL game.
- On March 1, 2014, New Jersey Devils forward Jaromir Jagr scored his 700th career goal, becoming the seventh player in league history to reach this milestone.
- On March 3, 2014, Dallas Stars coach Lindy Ruff recorded his 600th career regular season win against his former team the Buffalo Sabres, becoming the 12th coach to reach this milestone.
- On March 6, 2014, Colorado Avalanche forward Nathan MacKinnon broke one of Wayne Gretzky's records by earning a point in his 13th consecutive game, as the longest point streak by an 18-year-old. Gretzky had held the record for most consecutive points by an 18-year-old since the 1979–80 NHL season.
- On March 9, 2014, New York Rangers goaltender Henrik Lundqvist recorded his 300th career win, becoming the 29th goaltender to reach this milestone.
- On March 11, 2014, Minnesota Wild forward Matt Cooke participated in his 1,000th NHL game.
- On March 12, 2014, Vancouver Canucks forward Henrik Sedin participated in his 1,000th NHL game.
- On March 18, 2014, New York Rangers goaltender Henrik Lundqvist passed Mike Richter to achieve the most wins in franchise history with his 302nd career victory.
- On March 19, 2014, Chicago Blackhawks coach Joel Quenneville recorded his 700th career regular season win, becoming the third coach to reach this milestone.
- On March 19, 2014, Chicago Blackhawks forward Michal Handzus participated in his 1,000th NHL game.
- On March 20, 2014, Los Angeles Kings coach Darryl Sutter recorded his 500th career regular season win, becoming the 18th coach to reach this milestone.
- On March 22, 2014, New York Rangers goaltender Henrik Lundqvist passed Eddie Giacomin to become the franchise's all-time shutout leader with his 50th shutout.
- On March 22, 2014, Los Angeles Kings goaltender Jonathan Quick passed Rogie Vachon to become the franchise's all-time wins leader with his 172nd win.
- On April 10, 2014, Colorado Avalanche goaltender Semyon Varlamov set a franchise record for wins in a season with his 41st victory. He surpassed former goalie and current head coach Patrick Roy's record of 40 set during the 2000–01 NHL season.
- On April 10, 2014, Nashville Predators goaltender Pekka Rinne passed Tomas Vokoun to become the franchises's all-time wins leader with his 162nd win.
- On April 11, 2014, the Buffalo Sabres dressed their ninth goaltender of the season, an NHL record (Ryan Miller, Jhonas Enroth, Michal Neuvirth, Nathan Lieuwen, Jaroslav Halak, Matt Hackett, Andrey Makarov, Connor Knapp and Ryan Vinz).
- On April 11, 2014, Tampa Bay Lightning goaltender Kristers Gudlevskis made his NHL debut thus becoming the first player in history to play in ECHL, AHL, NHL and Olympic Games during one season.
- On May 13, 2014, New York Rangers center Brad Richards notched his seventh career Game 7 Stanley Cup playoffs win. Consequently, Richards was now 7–0 lifetime in Game 7s, tying former Toronto Maple Leafs defenceman Red Kelly in this league milestone.

== Broadcasting rights ==
=== Canada ===
The league's Canadian broadcast agreements with CBC and TSN/RDS expired at the end of the season. At the same time, the league had reportedly aimed for its next round of Canadian television contracts to have a value of at least C$3.2 billion in total. During negotiations, NHL commissioner Gary Bettman had reportedly recognized the broadcaster's financial difficulties and budget cuts imposed by the federal Conservative government which had decreased CBC's chances of maintaining rights to Hockey Night in Canada and offered CBC a simplified broadcast package which would have consisted of a national doubleheader on Saturday nights (as opposed to regional coverage of multiple games), reduced playoff coverage, and the loss of digital rights and the All-Star Game. Rights to the remaining properties not covered under the CBC's contract would have been offered to other broadcasters. However, CBC Sports' staff, including executive director Jeffrey Orridge, continued to insist that it have exclusivity for every Saturday night game involving Canadian teams. In turn, CBC failed to reach a deal; BCE (owners of Bell Media and previous cable rightsholder TSN and over the air broadcaster, CTV) made a bid for sole national rights to the NHL, and attempted to contact the CBC in regards to forming a partnership. However, CBC Sports' staff did not respond. In turn, Rogers Communications also made a bid of its own.

On November 26, 2013, the NHL announced it had sold twelve seasons' worth of exclusive national broadcast rights to NHL games to Rogers, who would broadcast games across its numerous platforms, including Sportsnet, Sportsnet One, and City, at a price of C$5.2 billion. Hockey Night in Canada would continue on the CBC for the next four seasons; the CBC would give Rogers six hours of free airtime each night to air the broadcasts but paid no rights fee. CBC would be allotted time during the broadcasts to promote its other programming. French language broadcasts were moved to TVA Sports under a sub-licensing deal with Rogers. The moves have left both Bell Media (except for its regional properties) and the CBC (which, in turn, would no longer compete with private broadcasters for professional sports) officially shut out of the national NHL broadcasts.

=== United States ===
This was the third season under the NHL's ten-year U.S. rights deal with NBC Sports, with games on the NBC broadcast network, NBCSN, and selected Stanley Cup playoff games on CNBC.

== See also ==
- Lester Patrick Trophy
