= 2000 Stanley Cup playoffs =

Hockey tournament

Tournament details
- Dates: April 12–June 10, 2000
- Teams: 16
- Defending champions: Dallas Stars

Final positions
- Champions: New Jersey Devils
- Runners-up: Dallas Stars

Tournament statistics
- Scoring leader(s): Brett Hull (Stars) (24 points)

Awards
- MVP: Scott Stevens (Devils)

The 2000 Stanley Cup playoffs, was the playoff tournament of the National Hockey League (NHL), that began on April 12, 2000, and concluded on June 10. The New Jersey Devils defeated the reigning champion Dallas Stars in a six-game series to win their second Stanley Cup title in franchise history.

Sixteen teams qualified for the playoffs, eight from each conference, played best-of-seven series in each round, ending with each conference's champion playing a best-of-seven series in the Stanley Cup Final for the Stanley Cup.

The Calgary Flames and the Vancouver Canucks both missed the playoffs this year. This would not happen again until 2014, when all four Western Canadian teams missed the playoffs.

For the first time in history, only two Original Six teams made it to the playoffs (Toronto and Detroit). This has happened five more times since then, with most recent occurrence happening in 2025.

Also, for the first time in history, both the Boston Bruins and the Montreal Canadiens missed the playoffs in the same season.

In addition, both conference finals went to the maximum seven games. This did not happen again until 2015.

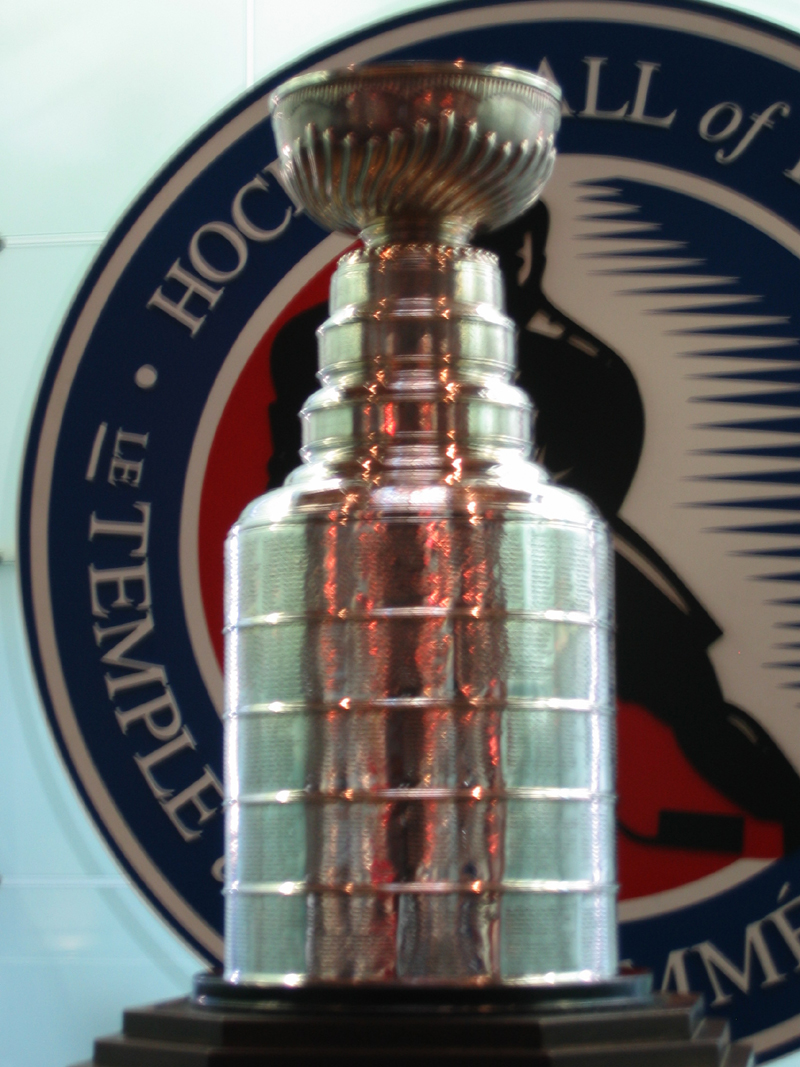
The Stanley Cup, awarded to the champion of the NHL.

== Playoff seeds ==
The top eight teams in each conference qualified for the playoffs. The top three seeds in each conference were awarded to the division winners; while the five remaining spots were awarded to the highest finishers in their respective conferences.

The following teams qualified for the playoffs:

=== Eastern Conference ===
1. Philadelphia Flyers, Atlantic Division champions, Eastern Conference regular season champions – 105 points
2. Washington Capitals, Southeast Division champions – 102 points
3. Toronto Maple Leafs, Northeast Division champions – 100 points
4. New Jersey Devils – 103 points
5. Florida Panthers – 98 points
6. Ottawa Senators – 95 points
7. Pittsburgh Penguins – 88 points
8. Buffalo Sabres – 85 points

=== Western Conference ===
1. St. Louis Blues, Central Division champions, Western Conference regular season champions, Presidents' Trophy winners – 114 points
2. Dallas Stars, Pacific Division champions – 102 points
3. Colorado Avalanche, Northwest Division champions – 96 points
4. Detroit Red Wings – 108 points
5. Los Angeles Kings – 94 points
6. Phoenix Coyotes – 90 points
7. Edmonton Oilers – 88 points
8. San Jose Sharks – 87 points

== Playoff bracket ==
In each round, teams competed in a best-of-seven series following a 2–2–1–1–1 format (scores in the bracket indicate the number of games won in each best-of-seven series). The team with home ice advantage played at home for games one and two (and games five and seven, if necessary), and the other team played at home for games three and four (and game six, if necessary). The top eight teams in each conference made the playoffs, with the three division winners seeded 1–3 based on regular season record, and the five remaining teams seeded 4–8.

The NHL used "re-seeding" instead of a fixed bracket playoff system. During the first three rounds, the highest remaining seed in each conference was matched against the lowest remaining seed, the second-highest remaining seed played the second-lowest remaining seed, and so forth. The higher-seeded team was awarded home ice advantage. The two conference winners then advanced to the Stanley Cup Finals, where home ice advantage was awarded to the team that had the better regular season record.

Conference quarterfinals	Conference semifinals
1	Philadelphia	4
8	Buffalo	1
1	Philadelphia	4
7	Pittsburgh	2
2	Washington	1
7	Pittsburgh	4
Eastern Conference
3	Toronto	4
6	Ottawa	2
3	Toronto	2
4	New Jersey	4
4	New Jersey	4
5	Florida	0
1	St. Louis	3
8	San Jose	4
2	Dallas	4
8	San Jose	1
2	Dallas	4
7	Edmonton	1
Western Conference
3	Colorado	4
6	Phoenix	1
3	Colorado	4
4	Detroit	1
4	Detroit	4
5	Los Angeles	0

Conference finals
1	Philadelphia	3
4	New Jersey	4
2	Dallas	4
3	Colorado	3

Stanley Cup Final
E4	New Jersey	4
W2	Dallas	2

== Conference quarterfinals ==
=== Eastern Conference quarterfinals ===
==== (1) Philadelphia Flyers vs. (8) Buffalo Sabres ====
The Philadelphia Flyers finished first in the Atlantic Division and Eastern Conference during the regular season with 105 points. The Buffalo Sabres qualified as the eighth seed earning 85 points. This was the sixth playoff meeting between these two teams; with Philadelphia winning four of the five previous series. They last met in the 1998 Eastern Conference Quarterfinals, which Buffalo won in five games. Philadelphia won three of the four games in this year's regular season series.

April 13	Buffalo Sabres	2–3	Philadelphia Flyers	First Union Center	Recap
No scoring		First period	14:56 – pp – Keith Jones (1); 19:52 – sh – Daymond Langkow (1)
Stu Barnes (1) –pp – 05:53; Miroslav Satan (1) – 12:22		Second period	No scoring
No scoring		Third period	05:33 – pp – Simon Gagne (1)
Dominik Hasek 27 saves / 30 shots		Goalie stats	Brian Boucher 18 saves / 20 shots

April 14	Buffalo Sabres	1–2	Philadelphia Flyers	First Union Center	Recap
Miroslav Satan (2) – 10:40		First period	No scoring
No scoring		Second period	04:53 – pp – John LeClair (1)
No scoring		Third period	04:47 – pp – Eric Desjardins (1)
Dominik Hasek 25 saves / 27 shots		Goalie stats	Brian Boucher 30 saves / 31 shots

April 16	Philadelphia Flyers	2–0	Buffalo Sabres	HSBC Arena	Recap
John LeClair (2) – pp – 15:30		First period	No scoring
No scoring		Second period	No scoring
Mark Recchi (1) – en – 19:22		Third period	No scoring
Brian Boucher 17 saves / 17 shots		Goalie stats	Dominik Hasek 25 saves / 26 shots

April 18	Philadelphia Flyers	2–3	OT	Buffalo Sabres	HSBC Arena	Recap
No scoring		First period		02:39 – pp – Curtis Brown (1)
Rick Tocchet (1) – pp – 13:55; Keith Primeau (1) – 18:25		Second period		01:03 – Miroslav Satan (3)
No scoring		Third period		No scoring
No scoring		First overtime period		04:42 – Stu Barnes (2)
Brian Boucher 31 saves / 34 shots		Goalie stats		Dominik Hasek 26 saves / 28 shots

April 20	Buffalo Sabres	2–5	Philadelphia Flyers	First Union Center	Recap
Richard Smehlik (1) – 08:44		First period	19:52 – Dan McGillis (1)
No scoring		Second period	09:47 – pp – John LeClair (3); 12:52 – Daymond Langkow (2)
Stu Barnes (3) – pp – 03:34		Third period	09:55 – pp – Simon Gagne; 19:59 – pp-en – Daymond Langkow (3)
Dominik Hasek 32 saves / 36 shots		Goalie stats	Brian Boucher 20 saves / 22 shots

Philadelphia won series 4–1

==== (2) Washington Capitals vs. (7) Pittsburgh Penguins ====
The Washington Capitals entered the playoffs as the Southeast Division champions earning the second seed in the Eastern Conference with 102 points. The Pittsburgh Penguins earned the seventh seed with 88 points. This was the sixth playoff meeting between these two teams; with Pittsburgh winning four of the five previous series. They last met in the 1996 Eastern Conference Quarterfinals, which Pittsburgh won in six games. Pittsburgh won three of the four games in this year's regular season series. Games 2 & 3 were played in Pittsburgh with Game 4 being played in Washington due to scheduling conflicts.

April 13	Pittsburgh Penguins	7–0	Washington Capitals	MCI Center	Recap
Janne Laukkanen (1) – 02:30; Robert Lang (1) – pp – 06:34; Martin Straka (1) – pp – 11:26		First period	No scoring
Jiri Slegr (1) – 03:00; Jan Hrdina (1) – 12:03; Tyler Wright (1) – 13:32		Second period	No scoring
Janne Laukkanen (2) – pp – 00:33		Third period	No scoring
Ron Tugnutt 32 saves / 32 shots		Goalie stats	Olaf Kolzig 14 saves / 20 shots Craig Billington 5 saves / 6 shots

April 15	Washington Capitals	1–2	OT	Pittsburgh Penguins	Mellon Arena	Recap
Peter Bondra (1) – pp – 17:18		First period		No scoring
No scoring		Second period		14:06 – Jan Hrdina (2)
No scoring		Third period		No scoring
No scoring		First overtime period		05:49 – pp – Jaromir Jagr (1)
Olaf Kolzig 19 saves / 21 shots		Goalie stats		Ron Tugnutt 37 saves / 38 shots

April 17	Washington Capitals	3–4	Pittsburgh Penguins	Mellon Arena	Recap
Chris Simon (1) – 15:39		First period	No scoring
Jeff Halpern (1) – 09:55		Second period	08:04 – pp – Jan Hrdina (3); 09:44 – Pat Falloon (1)
Calle Johansson (1) – pp – 14:02		Third period	02:13 – Jan Hrdina (4); 15:28 – Jiri Slegr (2)
Olaf Kolzig 18 saves / 22 shots		Goalie stats	Ron Tugnutt 24 saves / 27 shots

April 19	Pittsburgh Penguins	2–3	Washington Capitals	MCI Center	Recap
John Slaney (1) – pp – 10:18; Jaromir Jagr (2) – 19:39		First period	09:57 – sh – Steve Konowalchuk (1)
No scoring		Second period	13:39 – Chris Simon (2)
No scoring		Third period	12:55 – pp – Jeff Halpern (2)
Ron Tugnutt 34 saves/ 37 shots		Goalie stats	Olaf Kolzig 21 saves / 23 shots

April 21	Pittsburgh Penguins	2–1	Washington Capitals	MCI Center	Recap
Tyler Wright (2) – 05:52		First period	10:01 – Sergei Gonchar (1)
No scoring		Second period	No scoring
Jaromir Jagr (3) – 07:56		Third period	No scoring
Ron Tugnutt 25 saves / 26 shots		Goalie stats	Olaf Kolzig 15 saves / 17 shots

Pittsburgh won series 4–1

==== (3) Toronto Maple Leafs vs. (6) Ottawa Senators ====
The Toronto Maple Leafs entered the playoffs as the third seed in the Eastern Conference after winning the Northeast Division with 100 points. The Ottawa Senators earned the sixth seed with 95 points. This was the first playoff meeting between these two teams. Ottawa won three of the four games in this year's regular season series. Ottawa won this year's five-game regular season series earning seven of ten points.

April 12	Ottawa Senators	0–2	Toronto Maple Leafs	Air Canada Centre	Recap
No scoring		First period	No scoring
No scoring		Second period	08:53 – pp – Darcy Tucker (1)
No scoring		Third period	19:39 – en – Mats Sundin (1)
Tom Barrasso 19 saves / 21 shots		Goalie stats	Curtis Joseph 30 saves / 30 shots

April 15	Ottawa Senators	1–5	Toronto Maple Leafs	Air Canada Centre	Recap
No scoring		First period	No scoring
Sami Salo (1) – pp – 19:05		Second period	00:46 – Darcy Tucker (2); 01:28 – Mats Sundin (2); 03:49 – Steve Thomas (1); 12:46 – Steve Thomas (2)
No scoring		Third period	05:36 – Sergei Berezin (1)
Tom Barrasso 20 saves / 25 shots		Goalie stats	Curtis Joseph 29 saves / 30 shots

April 17	Toronto Maple Leafs	3–4	Ottawa Senators	Corel Centre	Recap
No scoring		First period	05:24 – pp – Daniel Alfredsson (1)
Steve Thomas (3) – 10:03		Second period	09:44 – Rob Zamuner (1)
Dmitri Khristich (1) – 10:18; Jonas Hoglund (1) – 19:42		Third period	05:27 – Colin Forbes (1); 14:17 – Rob Zamuner (2)
Curtis Joseph 11 saves / 15 shots		Goalie stats	Tom Barrasso 33 saves / 36 shots

April 19	Toronto Maple Leafs	1–2	Ottawa Senators	Corel Centre	Recap
No scoring		First period	No scoring
No scoring		Second period	08:15 – Andreas Dackell (1)
Sergei Berezin (2) – 16:10		Third period	03:23 – Andreas Dackell (2)
Curtis Joseph 20 saves / 22 shots		Goalie stats	Tom Barrasso 31 saves / 32 shots

April 22	Ottawa Senators	1–2	OT	Toronto Maple Leafs	Air Canada Centre	Recap
No scoring		First period		No scoring
Joe Juneau (1) – 04:36		Second period		No scoring
No scoring		Third period		15:30 – Steve Thomas (4)
No scoring		First overtime period		14:47 – Steve Thomas (5)
Tom Barrasso 29 saves / 31 shots		Goalie stats		Curtis Joseph 37 saves / 38 shots

April 24	Toronto Maple Leafs	4–2	Ottawa Senators	Corel Centre	Recap
No scoring		First period	03:45 – Joe Juneau (2)
Steve Thomas (6) – 04:11; Mats Sundin (3) – 07:16; Sergei Berezin (3) – 10:40; Wendel Clark (1) – 18:47		Second period	03:59 – Igor Kravchuk (1)
No scoring		Third period	No scoring
Curtis Joseph 36 saves / 38 shots		Goalie stats	Tom Barrasso 20 saves / 24 shots

Toronto won series 4–2

==== (4) New Jersey Devils vs. (5) Florida Panthers ====
The New Jersey Devils entered the playoffs as the fourth seed in the Eastern Conference with 103 points. The Florida Panthers earned the fifth seed with 98 points. This was the first playoff meeting between these two teams. New Jersey won three of the four games in this year's regular season series.

April 13	Florida Panthers	3–4	New Jersey Devils	Continental Airlines Arena	Recap
Rob Niedermayer (1) – 16:55; Peter Worrell (1) – 19:43		First period	01:38 – Scott Stevens (1); 04:02 – Petr Sykora (1); 15:28 – Sergei Brylin (1)
Mike Sillinger (1) – 13:50		Second period	07:21 – Scott Gomez (1)
No scoring		Third period	No scoring
Mike Vernon 29 saves / 33 shots		Goalie stats	Martin Brodeur 20 saves / 23 shots

April 16	Florida Panthers	1–2	New Jersey Devils	Continental Airlines Arena	Recap
Mike Sillinger (2) – 14:45		First period	No scoring
No scoring		Second period	00:56 – sh – Scott Niedermayer (1)
No scoring		Third period	03:42 – Scott Stevens (2)
Mike Vernon 26 saves / 28 shots		Goalie stats	Martin Brodeur 22 saves / 23 shots

April 18	New Jersey Devils	2–1	Florida Panthers	National Car Rental Center	Recap
No scoring		First period	09:19 – Ray Whitney (1)
Alexander Mogilny (1) – pp – 16:25		Second period	No scoring
Brian Rafalski (1) – 03:11		Third period	No scoring
Martin Brodeur 21 saves / 22 shots		Goalie stats	Mike Vernon 38 saves / 40 shots

April 20	New Jersey Devils	4–1	Florida Panthers	National Car Rental Center	Recap
No scoring		First period	05:17 – pp – Pavel Bure (1)
Patrik Elias (1) – 04:26; Scott Niedermayer (2) – 15:02		Second period	No scoring
Sergei Nemchinov (1) – 16:12; Sergei Nemchinov (2) – pp – 18:02		Third period	No scoring
Martin Brodeur 35 saves / 36 shots		Goalie stats	Mike Vernon 31 saves / 35 shots

New Jersey won series 4–0

=== Western Conference quarterfinals ===
==== (1) St. Louis Blues vs. (8) San Jose Sharks ====
The St. Louis Blues entered the playoffs as the Presidents' Trophy winners as the NHL's best regular season team with 114 points. The San Jose Sharks entered the playoffs as the eighth seed finishing the season with 87 points. This was the first playoff meeting between these two teams. St. Louis won this year's five-game regular season series earning nine of ten points.

April 12	San Jose Sharks	3–5	St. Louis Blues	Kiel Center	Recap
Dave Lowry (1) – 00:46; Mike Rathje (1) – 18:10		First period	05:41 – Jochen Hecht (1); 07:35 – Lubos Bartecko (1)
No scoring		Second period	02:29 – Jochen Hecht (2)
Owen Nolan (1) – sh – 14:40		Third period	03:15 – pp – Chris Pronger (1); 08:49 – Marty Reasoner (1)
Steve Shields 32 saves / 37 shots		Goalie stats	Roman Turek 28 saves / 31 shots

April 15	San Jose Sharks	4–2	St. Louis Blues	Kiel Center	Recap
Gary Suter (1) – pp – 17:10		First period	09:54 – Marty Reasoner (2)
No scoring		Second period	No scoring
Bryan Marchment (1) – 03:07; Mike Ricci (1) – pp – 14:18; Owen Nolan (2) – en – 18:57		Third period	08:35 – Stephane Richer (1)
Steve Shields 18 saves / 20 shots		Goalie stats	Roman Turek 15 saves / 18 shots

April 17	St. Louis Blues	1–2	San Jose Sharks	San Jose Arena	Recap
Scott Young (1) – pp – 15:14		First period	05:39 – pp – Owen Nolan (3)
No scoring		Second period	No scoring
No scoring		Third period	04:40 – Owen Nolan (4)
Roman Turek 20 saves / 22 shots		Goalie stats	Steve Shields 31 saves / 32 shots

April 19	St. Louis Blues	2–3	San Jose Sharks	San Jose Arena	Recap
No scoring		First period	06:08 – Marco Sturm (1)
Jochen Hecht (3) – pp – 12:54; Mike Eastwood (1) – 13:30		Second period	01:37 – Mike Ricci (2)
No scoring		Third period	11:23 – Gary Suter (2)
Roman Turek 16 saves / 19 shots		Goalie stats	Steve Shields 25 saves / 27 shots

April 21	San Jose Sharks	3–5	St. Louis Blues	Kiel Center	Recap
Mike Ricci (3) – pp – 18:52		First period	04:04 – pp – Ladislav Nagy (1); 04:39 – Al MacInnis (1); 07:13 – Ricard Persson (1)
Jeff Friesen (1) – 12:26; Brad Stuart (1) – pp – 17:03		Second period	No scoring
No scoring		Third period	03:34 – pp – Chris Pronger (2); 19:26 – en – Scott Young (2)
Steve Shields 28 saves / 32 shots		Goalie stats	Roman Turek 22 saves / 25 shots

April 23	St. Louis Blues	6–2	San Jose Sharks	San Jose Arena	Recap
Scott Young (3) – 12:31		First period	No scoring
Scott Young (4) – 00:21; Jochen Hecht (4) – 09:29; Chris Pronger (3) – 11:42; Tyson Nash (1) – 12:51; Scott Young (5)– pp – 14:22		Second period	17:13 – pp – Owen Nolan (5)
No scoring		Third period	16:00 – Bryan Marchment (2)
Roman Turek 25 saves / 27 shots		Goalie stats	Steve Shields 8 saves / 14 shots Evgeni Nabokov 10 saves / 10 shots

April 25	San Jose Sharks	3–1	St. Louis Blues	Kiel Center	Recap
Ronnie Stern (1) – 02:51; Owen Nolan (6) – 19:49		First period	No scoring
Jeff Friesen (2) – 14:14		Second period	No scoring
No scoring		Third period	02:09 – pp – Scott Young (6)
Steve Shields 21 saves / 22 shots		Goalie stats	Roman Turek 16 saves / 19 shots

San Jose won series 4–3

==== (2) Dallas Stars vs. (7) Edmonton Oilers ====
The Dallas Stars entered the playoffs as the Pacific Division champions earning the second seed in the Western Conference with 102 points. The Edmonton Oilers earned the seventh seed with 88 points. This was the fourth consecutive and sixth overall playoff match-up between these two teams; with Dallas winning three of the five previous series. Dallas won last year's Western Conference Quarterfinals in a four-game sweep. Dallas won this year's four-game regular season series earning seven of eight points.

April 12	Edmonton Oilers	1–2	Dallas Stars	Reunion Arena	Recap
No scoring		First period	No scoring
No scoring		Second period	12:32 – Mike Keane (1)
German Titov (1) – 07:00		Third period	11:31 – Roman Lyashenko (1)
Tommy Salo 30 saves / 32 shots		Goalie stats	Ed Belfour 11 saves / 12 shots

April 13	Edmonton Oilers	0–3	Dallas Stars	Reunion Arena	Recap
No scoring		First period	15:33 – Kirk Muller (1)
No scoring		Second period	17:54 – Brett Hull (1)
No scoring		Third period	06:22 – Scott Thornton (1)
Tommy Salo 19 saves / 22 shots		Goalie stats	Ed Belfour 17 saves / 17 shots

April 16	Dallas Stars	2–5	Edmonton Oilers	Skyreach Centre	Recap
No scoring		First period	08:40 – Doug Weight (1); 09:56 – Jim Dowd (1); 17:00 – pp – Doug Weight (2)
Brenden Morrow (1) – pp – 02:32; Mike Modano (1) – 10:59		Second period	01:16 – sh – Ryan Smyth (1); 06:13 – pp – Doug Weight (3)
No scoring		Third period	No scoring
Ed Belfour 33 saves / 38 shots		Goalie stats	Tommy Salo 26 saves / 28 shots

April 18	Dallas Stars	4–3	Edmonton Oilers	Skyreach Centre	Recap
Brett Hull (2) – 05:02; Richard Matvichuk (1) – 05:50		First period	09:19 – pp – Bill Guerin (1); 11:43 – Bill Guerin (2)
Mike Modano (2) – 00:52		Second period	18:06 – Bill Guerin (3)
Guy Carbonneau (1) – 05:01		Third period	No scoring
Ed Belfour 15 saves / 18 shots		Goalie stats	Tommy Salo 20 saves / 24 shots

April 21	Edmonton Oilers	2–3	Dallas Stars	Reunion Arena	Recap
No scoring		First period	No scoring
Todd Marchant (1) – 12:45		Second period	05:35 – pp – Jamie Langenbrunner (1); 14:12 – Derian Hatcher (1)
Jim Dowd (2) – 01:07		Third period	14:58 – Brett Hull (3)
Tommy Salo 24 saves / 27 shots		Goalie stats	Ed Belfour 24 saves / 26 shots

Dallas won series 4–1

==== (3) Colorado Avalanche vs. (6) Phoenix Coyotes ====
The Colorado Avalanche entered the playoffs as the third seed in the Western Conference by winning the Northwest Division with 96 points. The Phoenix Coyotes earned the sixth seed with 90 points. This was the first playoff meeting between these two teams. These teams split their four-game regular season series.

April 13	Phoenix Coyotes	3–6	Colorado Avalanche	Pepsi Center	Recap
No scoring		First period	04:23 – Shjon Podein (1); 08:10 – Dave Andreychuk (1); 14:08 – Sandis Ozolinsh (1); 18:14 – Sandis Ozolinsh (2)
Travis Green (1) – 01:37; Shane Doan (1) – pp – 04:19		Second period	14:18 – Alex Tanguay (1)
Teppo Numminen (1) – 08:18		Third period	12:11 – Shjon Podein (2)
Sean Burke 32 saves / 38 shots		Goalie stats	Patrick Roy 12 saves / 15 shots

April 15	Phoenix Coyotes	1–3	Colorado Avalanche	Pepsi Center	Recap
No scoring		First period	03:31 – pp – Chris Drury (1); 04:27 – pp – Alex Tanguay (2)
Benoit Hogue (1) – 05:42		Second period	09:32 – pp – Milan Hejduk (1)
No scoring		Third period	No scoring
Sean Burke 32 saves / 35 shots		Goalie stats	Patrick Roy 25 saves / 26 shots

April 17	Colorado Avalanche	4–2	Phoenix Coyotes	America West Arena	Recap
No scoring		First period	No scoring
Shjon Podein (3) – 09:32; Joe Sakic (1) – pp – 14:48		Second period	00:49 – pp – Keith Tkachuk (1)
Adam Deadmarsh (1) – pp – 06:17; Adam Deadmarsh (2) – en – 19:36		Third period	06:17 – pp – Jeremy Roenick (1)
Patrick Roy 23 saves / 25 shots		Goalie stats	Sean Burke 22 saves / 25 shots

April 19	Colorado Avalanche	2–3	Phoenix Coyotes	America West Arena	Recap
No scoring		First period	03:31 – Trevor Letowski (1); 17:32 – Travis Green (2)
Dave Andreychuk (2) – pp – 06:03		Second period	00:38 – Mikael Renberg (1)
Adam Deadmarsh (3) – 16:02		Third period	No scoring
Patrick Roy 28 saves / 31 shots		Goalie stats	Sean Burke 36 saves / 38 shots

April 21	Phoenix Coyotes	1–2	Colorado Avalanche	Pepsi Center	Recap
No scoring		First period	No scoring
Jeremy Roenick (2) – 12:31		Second period	18:25 – Sandis Ozolinsh (3)
No scoring		Third period	05:43 – Peter Forsberg (1)
Sean Burke 29 saves / 31 shots		Goalie stats	Patrick Roy 19 saves / 20 shots

Colorado won series 4–1

==== (4) Detroit Red Wings vs. (5) Los Angeles Kings ====
The Detroit Red Wings entered the playoffs as the fourth seed in the Western Conference with 108 points. The Los Angeles Kings earned the fifth seed with 94 points. This was the first playoff meeting between these two teams. These teams split their five-game regular season series.

April 13	Los Angeles Kings	0–2	Detroit Red Wings	Joe Louis Arena	Recap
No scoring		First period	No scoring
No scoring		Second period	01:43 – Vyacheslav Kozlov (1)
No scoring		Third period	19:47 – en – Sergei Fedorov (1)
Stephane Fiset 29 saves / 30 shots		Goalie stats	Chris Osgood 19 saves / 19 shots

April 15	Los Angeles Kings	5–8	Detroit Red Wings	Joe Louis Arena	Recap
Luc Robitaille (1) – 02:04; Zigmund Palffy (1) – 04:55; Sean O'Donnell (1) – 19:36		First period	00:55 – Brendan Shanahan (1); 01:33 – Martin Lapointe (1); 03:32 – Kris Draper (1); 06:56 – Martin Lapointe
Craig Johnson (1) – 11:43		Second period	03:27 – Kris Draper (2); 09:33 – pp – Martin Lapointe (3)
Zigmund Palffy (2) – 01:11		Third period	09:18 – pp – Nicklas Lidstrom (1); 19:23 – en – Nicklas Lidstrom (2)
Stephane Fiset 12 saves / 17 shots Jamie Storr 23 saves / 25 shots		Goalie stats	Chris Osgood 39 saves / 44 shots

April 17	Detroit Red Wings	2–1	Los Angeles Kings	Staples Center	Recap
Sergei Fedorov (2) – pp – 05:21		First period	No scoring
Tomas Holmstrom (1) – pp – 14:40		Second period	No scoring
No scoring		Third period	02:35 – Luc Robitaille (2)
Chris Osgood 21 saves / 22 shots		Goalie stats	Stephane Fiset 22 saves / 24 shots

April 19	Detroit Red Wings	3–0	Los Angeles Kings	Staples Center	Recap
Pat Verbeek (1) – pp – 17:10; Larry Murphy (1) – pp – 19:41		First period	No scoring
No scoring		Second period	No scoring
Sergei Fedorov (3) – en – 19:09		Third period	No scoring
Chris Osgood 25 saves / 25 shots		Goalie stats	Stephane Fiset 25 saves / 27 shots

Detroit won series 4–0

== Conference semifinals ==
=== Eastern Conference semifinals ===
==== (1) Philadelphia Flyers vs. (7) Pittsburgh Penguins ====
This was the third playoff meeting between these two teams; with Philadelphia winning both previous series. They last met in the 1997 Eastern Conference Quarterfinals, which Philadelphia won in five games. Philadelphia won this year's five-game regular season series earning nine of ten points.

Game four was the third-longest game in playoff history, as well as the longest since the NHL expanded in 1967.

April 27	Pittsburgh Penguins	2–0	Philadelphia Flyers	First Union Center	Recap
Jaromir Jagr (4) – 13:33		First period	No scoring
Martin Straka (2) – 04:46		Second period	No scoring
No scoring		Third period	No scoring
Ron Tugnutt 28 saves / 28 shots		Goalie stats	Brian Boucher 12 saves / 14 shots

April 29	Pittsburgh Penguins	4–1	Philadelphia Flyers	First Union Center	Recap
Robert Lang (2) – pp – 16:57		First period	No scoring
Jaromir Jagr (5) – pp – 14:45; Robert Lang (3) – 16:30		Second period	No scoring
Jaromir Jagr (6) – 10:59		Third period	04:34 – Simon Gagne (3)
Ron Tugnutt 44 saves / 45 shots		Goalie stats	Brian Boucher 21 saves / 25 shots

May 2	Philadelphia Flyers	4–3	OT	Pittsburgh Penguins	Mellon Arena	Recap
Andy Delmore (1) – 14:11; Keith Jones (2) – 16:27		First period		No Scoring
No scoring		Second period		00:40 – Jaromir Jagr (7); 10:24 – Martin Straka (3)
John LeClair (4) – 07:27		Third period		14:28 – Jaromir Jagr (8)
Andy Delmore (2) – 11:01		First overtime period		No scoring
Brian Boucher 15 saves / 18 shots		Goalie stats		Ron Tugnutt 40 saves / 44 shots

May 4	Philadelphia Flyers	2–1	5OT	Pittsburgh Penguins	Mellon Arena	Recap
No scoring		First period		02:22 – Alexei Kovalev (1)
No scoring		Second period		No scoring
John LeClair (5) – pp – 04:47		Third period		No scoring
Keith Primeau (2) – 12:01		Fifth overtime period		No scoring
Brian Boucher 57 saves / 58 shots		Goalie stats		Ron Tugnutt 70 saves / 72 shots

May 7	Pittsburgh Penguins	3–6	Philadelphia Flyers	First Union Center	Recap
No scoring		First period	00:23 – Daymond Langkow (4); 03:37 – pp – Andy Delmore (3)
Tyler Wright (3) – 15:06		Second period	00:16 – Dan McGillis (2); 03:47 – pp – Mark Recchi (2); 17:50 – Andy Delmore (4)
Darius Kasparaitis (1) – 00:40; Rob Brown (1) – 08:42		Third period	05:17 – Andy Delmore (5)
Ron Tugnutt 21 saves / 26 shots Peteris Skudra 10 saves / 11 shots		Goalie stats	Brian Boucher 29 saves / 32 shots

May 9	Philadelphia Flyers	2–1	Pittsburgh Penguins	Mellon Arena	Recap
Mark Recchi (3) – pp – 11:04		First period	No scoring
John LeClair (6) – 00:44		Second period	No scoring
No scoring		Third period	10:46 – Rene Corbet (1)
Brian Boucher 27 saves / 28 shots		Goalie stats	Ron Tugnutt 21 saves / 23 shots

Philadelphia won series 4–2

==== (3) Toronto Maple Leafs vs. (4) New Jersey Devils ====
This was the first playoff meeting between these two teams. Toronto won this year's four-game regular season series earning seven of eight points.

Martin Brodeur set a Stanley Cup playoff record in game six for the least shots against required (6) to record a shutout in a single game.

April 27	New Jersey Devils	1–2	Toronto Maple Leafs	Air Canada Centre	Recap
No scoring		First period	No scoring
Petr Sykora (2) – 05:54		Second period	01:07 – Dmitri Yushkevich (1)
No scoring		Third period	01:18 – Darcy Tucker (3)
Martin Brodeur 19 saves / 21 shots		Goalie stats	Curtis Joseph 32 saves / 33 shots

April 29	New Jersey Devils	1–0	Toronto Maple Leafs	Air Canada Centre	Recap
Colin White (1) – 06:41		First period	No scoring
No scoring		Second period	No scoring
No scoring		Third period	No scoring
Martin Brodeur 20 saves / 20 shots		Goalie stats	Curtis Joseph 32 saves / 33 shots

May 1	Toronto Maple Leafs	1–5	New Jersey Devils	Continental Airlines Arena	Recap
No scoring		First period	No scoring
No scoring		Second period	09:42 – pp – Jason Arnott (1); 15:03 – Scott Gomez (2); 17:33 – sh – Patrik Elias (2)
Kevyn Adams (1) – sh – 15:43		Third period	04:27 – Petr Sykora (3); 06:01 – pp – Alexander Mogilny (2)
Curtis Joseph 31 saves / 36 shots		Goalie stats	Martin Brodeur 22 saves / 23 shots

May 3	Toronto Maple Leafs	3–2	New Jersey Devils	Continental Airlines Arena	Recap
Jonas Hoglund (2) – 10:01; Darcy Tucker (4) – 16:02		First period	01:41 – pp – Scott Gomez (3)
No scoring		Second period	No scoring
Tomas Kaberle (1) – 18:25		Third period	14:14 – Claude Lemieux (1)
Curtis Joseph 34 saves / 36 shots		Goalie stats	Martin Brodeur 19 saves / 22 shots

May 6	New Jersey Devils	4–3	Toronto Maple Leafs	Air Canada Centre	Recap
Patrik Elias (3) – pp – 16:11		First period	08:55 – Garry Valk (1)
Sergei Nemchinov (3) – 15:59		Second period	02:19 – Jeff Farkas (1)
Vladimir Malakhov (1) – pp – 07:47; John Madden (1) – 14:07		Third period	17:04 – Sergei Berezin (4)
Martin Brodeur 22 saves / 25 shots		Goalie stats	Curtis Joseph 28 saves / 32 shots

May 8	Toronto Maple Leafs	0–3	New Jersey Devils	Continental Airlines Arena	Recap
No scoring		First period	00:18 – Petr Sykora (4)
No scoring		Second period	00:25 – Jason Arnott (2)
No scoring		Third period	19:54 – en – John Madden (2)
Curtis Joseph 24 saves / 26 shots		Goalie stats	Martin Brodeur 6 saves / 6 shots

New Jersey won series 4–2

=== Western Conference semifinals ===
==== (2) Dallas Stars vs. (8) San Jose Sharks ====
This was the second playoff meeting between these two teams; with Dallas winning the only previous series. Their only previous meeting was in the 1998 Western Conference Quarterfinals, which Dallas won in six games. San Jose won four of the six games in this year's regular season series.

April 28	San Jose Sharks	0–4	Dallas Stars	Reunion Arena	Recap
No scoring		First period	05:45 – Aaron Gavey (1); 14:01 – pp – Mike Modano (3)
No scoring		Second period	No scoring
No scoring		Third period	02:48 – pp – Joe Nieuwendyk (1); 04:23 – Brenden Morrow (2)
Steve Shields 23 saves / 27 shots		Goalie stats	Ed Belfour 18 saves / 18 shots

April 30	San Jose Sharks	0–1	Dallas Stars	Reunion Arena	Recap
No scoring		First period	07:26 – Mike Modano (4)
No scoring		Second period	No scoring
No scoring		Third period	No scoring
Steve Shields 17 saves / 18 shots		Goalie stats	Ed Belfour 19 saves / 19 shots

May 2	Dallas Stars	1–2	San Jose Sharks	San Jose Arena	Recap
Mike Modano (5) – pp – 03:35		First period	No scoring
No scoring		Second period	05:42 – pp – Mike Ricci (4); 14:56 – Owen Nolan (7)
No scoring		Third period	No scoring
Ed Belfour 26 saves / 28 shots		Goalie stats	Steve Shields 30 saves / 31 shots

May 5	Dallas Stars	5–4	San Jose Sharks	San Jose Arena	Recap
Mike Modano (6) – 01:08; Guy Carbonneau (2) – sh – 10:21		First period	08:52 – pp – Vincent Damphousse (1); 17:34 – Mike Ricci (5)
Sergei Zubov (1) – sh – 00:56; Joe Nieuwendyk (2) – 10:52; Joe Nieuwendyk (3) – 18:07		Second period	07:48 – sh – Owen Nolan (8); 14:08 – pp – Todd Harvey (1)
No scoring		Third period	No scoring
Ed Belfour 31 saves / 35 shots		Goalie stats	Steve Shields 28 saves / 33 shots

May 7	San Jose Sharks	1–4	Dallas Stars	Reunion Arena	Recap
No scoring		First period	10:31 – Joe Nieuwendyk (4); 13:34 – Scott Thornton (2)
No scoring		Second period	No scoring
Patrick Marleau (1) – pp – 08:32		Third period	04:02 – pp – Brett Hull (4); 04:43 – pp – Sylvain Cote (1)
Steve Shields 26 saves / 30 shots		Goalie stats	Ed Belfour 32 saves / 33 shots

Dallas won series 4–1

==== (3) Colorado Avalanche vs. (4) Detroit Red Wings ====
This was the second consecutive playoff meeting and fourth overall playoff match-up between these two teams; with Colorado winning two of the three previous series. Colorado won last year's Western Conference Semifinals in six games. Detroit won four of the five games in this year's regular season series.

April 27	Detroit Red Wings	0–2	Colorado Avalanche	Pepsi Center	Recap
No scoring		First period	10:13 – Peter Forsberg (2)
No scoring		Second period	11:39 – pp – Sandis Ozolinsh (4)
No scoring		Third period	No scoring
Chris Osgood 24 saves / 26 shots		Goalie stats	Patrick Roy 25 saves / 25 shots

April 29	Detroit Red Wings	1–3	Colorado Avalanche	Pepsi Center	Recap
No scoring		First period	08:12 – pp – Milan Hejduk (2); 15:49 – pp – Peter Forsberg (3)
No scoring		Second period	No scoring
Tomas Holmstrom (2) – 08:12		Third period	19:01 – en – Chris Drury (2)
Chris Osgood 30 saves / 32 shots		Goalie stats	Patrick Roy 29 saves / 30 shots

May 1	Colorado Avalanche	1–3	Detroit Red Wings	Joe Louis Arena	Recap
No scoring		First period	09:38 – pp – Igor Larionov (1)
Peter Forsberg (4) – pp – 09:39		Second period	11:57 – pp – Sergei Fedorov (4)
No scoring		Third period	19:19 – en – Brendan Shanahan (2)
Patrick Roy 33 saves / 35 shots		Goalie stats	Chris Osgood 22 saves / 23 shots

May 3	Colorado Avalanche	3–2	OT	Detroit Red Wings	Joe Louis Arena	Recap
No scoring		First period		No scoring
Jon Klemm (1) – 03:37		Second period		08:46 – Tomas Holmstrom (3)
Dave Andreychuk (3) – 15:33		Third period		09:20 – pp – Vyacheslav Kozlov (2)
Chris Drury (3) – 10:21		First overtime period		No scoring
Patrick Roy 30 saves / 32 shots		Goalie stats		Chris Osgood 18 saves / 21 shots

May 5	Detroit Red Wings	2–4	Colorado Avalanche	Pepsi Center	Recap
No scoring		First period	No scoring
Larry Murphy (2) – sh – 12:01		Second period	02:46 – pp – Joe Sakic (2); 10:01 – Stephane Yelle (1)
Brendan Shanahan (3) – 06:13		Third period	04:40 – Peter Forsberg (5); 09:01 – Shjon Podein (4)
Chris Osgood 21 saves / 25 shots		Goalie stats	Patrick Roy 20 saves / 22 shots

Colorado won series 4–1

== Conference finals ==
=== Eastern Conference final ===
==== (1) Philadelphia Flyers vs. (4) New Jersey Devils ====
This was the third playoff meeting between these two teams; with the teams splitting the two previous series. They last met in the 1995 Eastern Conference Finals, which New Jersey won in six games. This was Philadelphia's seventh semifinal/conference final appearance since the league began using a 16-team or greater playoff format in 1980; they last made it to the Conference Finals in 1997 where they defeated the New York Rangers in five games. This was New Jersey's fourth appearance in the Conference Finals; they last made it to the Conference Finals in 1995. New Jersey won four of the five games during this year's regular season series.

The Devils overcame a 3–1 deficit to defeat the Flyers in seven games. In game seven Devils' forward Patrik Elias scored the series-winner at 17:28 of the third period. Eric Lindros suffered a concussion after getting hit by Scott Stevens in the first period of game seven and did not return; as a result of the hit this was the last game he played as a Flyer.

May 14	New Jersey Devils	4–1	Philadelphia Flyers	First Union Center	Recap
Scott Niedermayer (3) – 00:55; Petr Sykora (5) – 17:38; Bobby Holik (1) – 18:04		First period	08:20 – Mark Recchi (4)
No scoring		Second period	No scoring
Claude Lemieux (2) – pp – 05:19		Third period	No scoring
Martin Brodeur 35 saves / 36 shots		Goalie stats	Brian Boucher 20 saves / 24 shots

May 16	New Jersey Devils	3–4	Philadelphia Flyers	First Union Center	Recap
Scott Gomez (4) – 13:23		First period	01:38 – Rick Tocchet (2)
Jason Arnott (3) – 02:51; Patrik Elias (4) – 14:50		Second period	19:21 – Eric Desjardins (2)
No scoring		Third period	01:06 – Rick Tocchet (3); 01:58 – Daymond Langkow (5)
Martin Brodeur 26 saves / 30 shots		Goalie stats	Brian Boucher 30 saves / 33 shots

May 18	Philadelphia Flyers	4–2	New Jersey Devils	Continental Airlines Arena	Recap
Mark Recchi (5) – 02:57; Keith Jones (3) – 14:14		First period	04:24 – Claude Lemieux (3)
Rick Tocchet (4) – 07:15		Second period	No scoring
Simon Gagne (4) – 18:11		Third period	15:59 – Scott Niedermayer (4)
Brian Boucher 27 saves / 29 shots		Goalie stats	Martin Brodeur 17 saves / 21 shots

May 20	Philadelphia Flyers	3–1	New Jersey Devils	Continental Airlines Arena	Recap
Mark Recchi (6) – 16:07		First period	No scoring
No scoring		Second period	12:13 – Bobby Holik (2)
Craig Berube (1) – 12:58; Simon Gagne (5) – 16:40		Third period	No scoring
Brian Boucher 24 saves / 25 shots		Goalie stats	Martin Brodeur 18 saves / 21 shots

May 22	New Jersey Devils	4–1	Philadelphia Flyers	First Union Center	Recap
Jason Arnott (4) – pp – 10:25; Bobby Holik (3) – 15:15		First period	No scoring
Petr Sykora (6) – 01:47		Second period	15:45 – pp – Valeri Zelepukin (1)
Patrik Elias (5) – 00:54		Third period	No scoring
Martin Brodeur 20 saves / 21 shots		Goalie stats	Brian Boucher 26 saves / 30 shots

May 24	Philadelphia Flyers	1–2	New Jersey Devils	Continental Airlines Arena	Recap
No scoring		First period	No scoring
No scoring		Second period	No scoring
Eric Lindros (1) – 19:31		Third period	11:26 – Claude Lemieux (4); 16:33 – Alexander Mogilny (3)
Brian Boucher 24 saves / 26 shots		Goalie stats	Martin Brodeur 12 saves / 13 shots

May 26	New Jersey Devils	2–1	Philadelphia Flyers	First Union Center	Recap
Patrik Elias (6) – pp – 06:44		First period	No scoring
No scoring		Second period	06:01 – pp – Rick Tocchet (5)
Patrik Elias (7) – 17:28		Third period	No scoring
Martin Brodeur 26 saves / 27 shots		Goalie stats	Brian Boucher 16 saves / 18 shots

New Jersey won series 4–3

=== Western Conference final ===
==== (2) Dallas Stars vs. (3) Colorado Avalanche ====
This was the second consecutive playoff meeting and second postseason match-up between these two teams. This was a rematch of last year's Western Conference Final, which Dallas won in seven games. Dallas made their third consecutive and seventh semifinal/conference final appearance since the league began using a 16-team or greater playoff format in 1980; while Colorado made their second consecutive and sixth overall appearance in the Conference Finals. Colorado won this year's five-game regular season series earning seven of ten points.

May 13	Colorado Avalanche	2–0	Dallas Stars	Reunion Arena	Recap
No scoring		First period	No scoring
Milan Hejduk (3) – pp – 08:51; Aaron Miller (1) – 17:32		Second period	No scoring
No scoring		Third period	No scoring
Patrick Roy 24 saves / 24 shots		Goalie stats	Ed Belfour 16 saves / 18 shots

May 15	Colorado Avalanche	2–3	Dallas Stars	Reunion Arena	Recap
No scoring		First period	No scoring
Sandis Ozolinsh (5) – pp – 00:25		Second period	05:24 – Mike Modano (7); 18:15 – pp – Mike Modano (8)
Peter Forsberg (6) – 14:23		Third period	05:48 – Brett Hull (5)
Patrick Roy 31 saves / 34 shots		Goalie stats	Ed Belfour 20 saves / 22 shots

May 19	Dallas Stars	0–2	Colorado Avalanche	Pepsi Center	Recap
No scoring		First period	01:39 – Shjon Podein (5)
No scoring		Second period	14:50 – pp – Adam Deadmarsh (4)
No scoring		Third period	No scoring
Ed Belfour 38 saves / 40 shots		Goalie stats	Patrick Roy 21 saves / 21 shots

May 21	Dallas Stars	4–1	Colorado Avalanche	Pepsi Center	Recap
Joe Nieuwendyk (5) – pp – 07:12; Brett Hull (6) – 17:30		First period	No scoring
Brett Hull (7) – 07:52		Second period	01:43 – Dave Reid (1)
Richard Matvichuk (2) – 04:39		Third period	No scoring
Ed Belfour 38 saves / 39 shots		Goalie stats	Patrick Roy 11 saves / 15 shots

May 23	Colorado Avalanche	2–3	OT	Dallas Stars	Reunion Arena	Recap
Jon Klemm (2) – 12:11		First period		No scoring
No scoring		Second period		04:26 – Jere Lehtinen (1); 14:41 – pp – Brett Hull (8)
Milan Hejduk (4) – 02:19		Third period		No scoring
No scoring		First overtime period		12:10 – Joe Nieuwendyk (6)
Patrick Roy 17 saves / 20 shots		Goalie stats		Ed Belfour 28 saves / 31 shots

May 25	Dallas Stars	1–2	Colorado Avalanche	Pepsi Center	Recap
No scoring		First period	No scoring
Brett Hull (9) – pp – 12:37		Second period	04:30 – Ray Bourque (1)
No scoring		Third period	16:09 – Chris Drury (4)
Ed Belfour 19 saves / 21 shots		Goalie stats	Patrick Roy 26 saves / 27 shots

May 27	Colorado Avalanche	2–3	Dallas Stars	Reunion Arena	Recap
No scoring		First period	06:36 – pp – Sergei Zubov (2); 19:54 – pp – Mike Modano (9)
No scoring		Second period	05:31 – Roman Lyashenko (2)
Peter Forsberg (7) – sh – 05:25; Milan Hejduk (5) – 08:26		Third period	No scoring
Patrick Roy 26 saves / 29 shots		Goalie stats	Ed Belfour 31 saves / 33 shots

Dallas won series 4–3

== Stanley Cup Final ==
This was the first playoff meeting between these two teams. Dallas made their second consecutive and fourth overall appearance in the Finals, after defeating the Buffalo Sabres in six games the year before. New Jersey made their second Finals appearance and first since defeating the Detroit Red Wings in four games in 1995. Dallas won both games in this year's regular season series.

May 30	Dallas Stars	3–7	New Jersey Devils	Continental Airlines Arena	Recap
Darryl Sydor (1) – 13:13		First period	07:22 – Jason Arnott (5)
No scoring		Second period	02:52 – Ken Daneyko (1); 10:28 – Petr Sykora (7); 16:04 – Scott Stevens (3)
Jon Sim (1) – 07:43; Kirk Muller (2) – 07:55		Third period	02:21 – Sergei Brylin (2); 03:02 – Petr Sykora (8); 05:12 – pp – Jason Arnott (6)
Ed Belfour 12 saves / 18 shots Manny Fernandez 7 saves / 8 shots		Goalie stats	Martin Brodeur 15 saves / 18 shots

June 1	Dallas Stars	2–1	New Jersey Devils	Continental Airlines Arena	Recap
Brett Hull (10) – 04:25		First period	12:42 – Alexander Mogilny (4)
No scoring		Second period	No scoring
Brett Hull (11) – 15:44		Third period	No scoring
Ed Belfour 27 saves / 28 shots		Goalie stats	Martin Brodeur 15 saves / 17 shots

June 3	New Jersey Devils	2–1	Dallas Stars	Reunion Arena	Recap
Jason Arnott (7) – 18:06		First period	13:08 – pp – Sylvain Cote (2)
Petr Sykora (9) – pp – 12:27		Second period	No scoring
No scoring		Third period	No scoring
Martin Brodeur 22 saves / 23 shots		Goalie stats	Ed Belfour 29 saves / 31 shots

June 5	New Jersey Devils	3–1	Dallas Stars	Reunion Arena	Recap
No scoring		First period	No scoring
No scoring		Second period	18:02 – pp – Joe Nieuwendyk (7)
Sergei Brylin (3) – 02:27; John Madden (3) – sh – 04:51; Brian Rafalski (2) – 06:08		Third period	No scoring
Martin Brodeur 16 saves / 17 shots		Goalie stats	Ed Belfour 28 saves / 31 shots

June 8	Dallas Stars	1–0	3OT	New Jersey Devils	Continental Airlines Arena	Recap
No scoring		First period		No scoring
No scoring		Second period		No scoring
No scoring		Third period		No scoring
Mike Modano (10) – 06:21		Third overtime period		No scoring
Ed Belfour 48 saves / 48 shots		Goalie stats		Martin Brodeur 40 saves / 41 shots

June 10	New Jersey Devils	2–1	2OT	Dallas Stars	Reunion Arena	Recap
No scoring		First period		No scoring
Scott Niedermayer (5) – sh – 05:18		Second period		06:27 – Mike Keane (2)
No scoring		Third period		No scoring
Jason Arnott (8) – 08:20		Second overtime period		No scoring
Martin Brodeur 30 saves / 31 shots		Goalie stats		Ed Belfour 43 saves / 45 shots

New Jersey won series 4–2

== Playoff statistics ==
=== Skaters ===
These are the top ten skaters based on points.

Player	Team	GP	G	A	Pts	+/–	PIM
Brett Hull	Dallas Stars	23	11	13	24	+3	4
Mike Modano	Dallas Stars	23	10	13	23	+3	10
Jason Arnott	New Jersey Devils	23	8	12	20	+7	18
Patrik Elias	New Jersey Devils	23	7	13	20	+9	9
Mark Recchi	Philadelphia Flyers	18	6	12	18	+3	6
Petr Sykora	New Jersey Devils	23	9	8	17	+8	10
Jaromir Jagr	Pittsburgh Penguins	11	8	8	16	+5	6
Peter Forsberg	Colorado Avalanche	16	7	8	15	+9	12
Adam Deadmarsh	Colorado Avalanche	17	4	11	15	+7	21
Chris Drury	Colorado Avalanche	17	4	10	14	+7	4

=== Goaltenders ===
This is a combined table of the top five goaltenders based on goals against average and the top five goaltenders based on save percentage, with at least 420 minutes played. The table is sorted by GAA, and the criteria for inclusion are bolded.

Player	Team	GP	W	L	SA	GA	GAA	SV%	SO	TOI
Martin Brodeur	New Jersey Devils	23	16	7	537	39	**1.61**	**.927**	2	1450:04
Ron Tugnutt	Pittsburgh Penguins	11	6	5	398	22	**1.77**	**.945**	2	746:03
Patrick Roy	Colorado Avalanche	17	11	6	431	31	**1.79**	**.928**	3	1039:20
Ed Belfour	Dallas Stars	23	14	9	651	45	**1.87**	**.931**	4	1442:56
Chris Osgood	Detroit Red Wings	9	5	4	237	18	**1.97**	**.924**	2	546:54

== See also ==
- List of Stanley Cup champions
- 1999 NHL entry draft
- 50th National Hockey League All-Star Game
- National Hockey League All-Star Game
- NHL All-Rookie Team
- 1999 in sports
- 2000 in sports
- 1999–2000 NHL season
- List of NHL seasons

Preceded by 1999 Stanley Cup playoffs	Stanley Cup playoffs 2000	Succeeded by 2001 Stanley Cup playoffs
