= 1999 Stanley Cup playoffs =

Tournament details
- Dates: April 21–June 19, 1999
- Teams: 16
- Defending champions: Detroit Red Wings

Final positions
- Champions: Dallas Stars
- Runners-up: Buffalo Sabres

Tournament statistics
- Scoring leader(s): Peter Forsberg (Avalanche) (24 points)

Awards
- MVP: Joe Nieuwendyk (Stars)

The 1999 Stanley Cup playoffs, the playoff tournament of the National Hockey League (NHL), began on April 21, 1999, following the 1998–99 NHL season. Prior to the season, the league realigned its teams into six divisions (three in each conference). Thus, the 16-team, conference-oriented playoff format used since 1994 was modified accordingly to allow each of the division winners to automatically qualify, along with five other teams from each conference. The teams played best-of-seven series for conference quarter-finals, semi-finals and championships, and then the conference champions played a best-of-seven series for the Stanley Cup.

Despite his team being eliminated in the Conference Finals, Colorado Avalanche forward Peter Forsberg's postseason scoring totals, with 24 points in 19 games, were not surpassed for the remainder of the 1999 playoffs. This made him the first player to lead all playoff scorers despite not making the Finals since 1986 when Doug Gilmour and Bernie Federko each tallied 21 points in 19 postseason games for the St. Louis Blues who were also eliminated in the Conference Finals.

The playoffs ended on June 19, 1999, with the Dallas Stars defeating the Buffalo Sabres to win their first Stanley Cup championship in their history. Brett Hull scored a triple overtime goal in game six for Dallas, while Joe Nieuwendyk was awarded the Conn Smythe Trophy as the MVP of the playoffs.

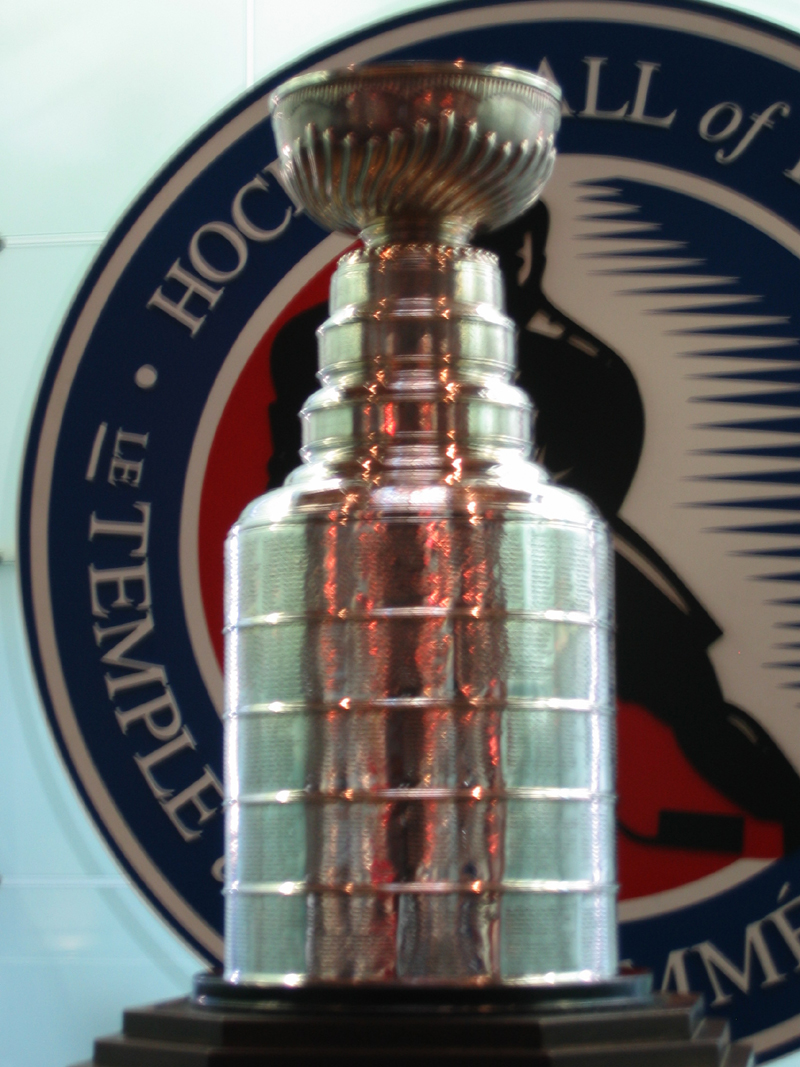
The Stanley Cup, awarded to the champion of the NHL.

== Playoff seeds ==
The NHL adopted a new league alignment for the 1998–99 season, dividing each conference into three divisions instead of two. Thus, the top three seeds in each conference were awarded to the division winners, while the five remaining spots were awarded to the highest finishers in their respective conferences.

The following teams qualified for the playoffs:

=== Eastern Conference ===
1. New Jersey Devils, Atlantic Division champions, Eastern Conference regular season champions – 105 points
2. Ottawa Senators, Northeast Division champions – 103 points
3. Carolina Hurricanes, Southeast Division champions – 86 points
4. Toronto Maple Leafs – 97 points
5. Philadelphia Flyers – 93 points
6. Boston Bruins – 91 points (39 wins)
7. Buffalo Sabres – 91 points (37 wins)
8. Pittsburgh Penguins – 90 points

=== Western Conference ===
1. Dallas Stars, Pacific Division champions, Western Conference regular season champions, Presidents' Trophy winners – 114 points
2. Colorado Avalanche, Northwest Division champions – 98 points
3. Detroit Red Wings, Central Division champions – 93 points
4. Phoenix Coyotes – 90 points
5. St. Louis Blues – 87 points
6. Mighty Ducks of Anaheim – 83 points
7. San Jose Sharks – 80 points
8. Edmonton Oilers – 78 points

== Playoff bracket ==
In each round, teams competed in a best-of-seven series following a 2–2–1–1–1 format (scores in the bracket indicate the number of games won in each best-of-seven series). The team with home ice advantage played at home for games one and two (and games five and seven, if necessary), and the other team played at home for games three and four (and game six, if necessary). The top eight teams in each conference made the playoffs, with the three division winners seeded 1–3 based on regular season record, and the five remaining teams seeded 4–8.

The NHL used "re-seeding" instead of a fixed bracket playoff system. During the first three rounds, the highest remaining seed in each conference was matched against the lowest remaining seed, the second-highest remaining seed played the second-lowest remaining seed, and so forth. The higher-seeded team was awarded home ice advantage. The two conference winners then advanced to the Stanley Cup Finals, where home ice advantage was awarded to the team that had the better regular season record.

Conference quarterfinals	Conference semifinals
1	New Jersey	3
8	Pittsburgh	4
4	Toronto	4
8	Pittsburgh	2
2	Ottawa	0
7	Buffalo	4
Eastern Conference
3	Carolina	2
6	Boston	4
6	Boston	2
7	Buffalo	4
4	Toronto	4
5	Philadelphia	2
1	Dallas	4
8	Edmonton	0
1	Dallas	4
5	St. Louis	2
2	Colorado	4
7	San Jose	2
Western Conference
3	Detroit	4
6	Anaheim	0
2	Colorado	4
3	Detroit	2
4	Phoenix	3
5	St. Louis	4

Conference finals
4	Toronto	1
7	Buffalo	4
1	Dallas	4
2	Colorado	3

Stanley Cup Finals
E7	Buffalo	2
W1	Dallas	4

== Conference quarterfinals ==
=== Eastern Conference quarterfinals ===
==== (1) New Jersey Devils vs. (8) Pittsburgh Penguins ====
This was the fourth playoff meeting between these two teams; with Pittsburgh winning two of the three previous series. They last met in the 1995 Eastern Conference Semifinals, where New Jersey won in five games.

April 22	Pittsburgh Penguins	1–3	New Jersey Devils	Continental Airlines Arena	Recap
Jan Hrdina (1) – 07:20		First period	07:35 – Petr Sykora (1)
No scoring		Second period	14:55 – Petr Sykora (2)
No scoring		Third period	19:29 – en – Jay Pandolfo (1)
Tom Barasso 16 saves / 18 shots		Goalie stats	Martin Brodeur 24 saves / 25 shots

April 24	Pittsburgh Penguins	4–1	New Jersey Devils	Continental Airlines Arena	Recap
Alexei Morozov (1) – 07:09		First period	No scoring
Greg Andrusak (1) – 03:19; Martin Straka (1) – 12:55		Second period	No scoring
Alexei Kovalev (1) – 01:41		Third period	11:41 – Dave Andreychuk (1)
Tom Barasso 28 saves / 29 shots		Goalie stats	Martin Brodeur 13 saves / 17 shots

April 25	New Jersey Devils	2–4	Pittsburgh Penguins	Civic Arena	Recap
Sergei Brylin (1) – pp – 12:51		First period	05:56 – pp – Martin Straka (2)
Jason Arnott (1) – pp – 15:43		Second period	No scoring
No scoring		Third period	00:13 – Martin Straka (3); 00:40 – Alex Kovalev (2); 19:43 – en – Martin Straka (4)
Martin Brodeur 18 saves / 21 shots		Goalie stats	Tom Barasso 31 saves / 33 shots

April 27	New Jersey Devils	4–2	Pittsburgh Penguins	Civic Arena	Recap
Brian Rolston (1) – sh – 01:38; Randy McKay (1) – 19:18		First period	02:50 – pp – Jan Hrdina (2)
Sergei Brylin (2) – 00:51		Second period	07:28 – pp – Rob Brown
Scott Stevens (1) – pp – 02:50		Third period	No scoring
Martin Brodeur 16 saves / 18 shots		Goalie stats	Tom Barasso 35 saves / 39 shots

April 30	Pittsburgh Penguins	3–4	New Jersey Devils	Continental Airlines Arena	Recap
No scoring		First period	16:02 – pp – Scott Stevens (2)
Kevin Hatcher (1) – 16:08; Alex Kovalev (3) – 16:21		Second period	11:47 – Randy McKay (2)
Kip Miller (1) – pp – 19:13		Third period	01:42 – Petr Sykora (3); 14:04 – Randy McKay (3)
Tom Barasso 23 saves / 27 shots		Goalie stats	Martin Brodeur 14 saves / 17 shots

May 2	New Jersey Devils	2–3	OT	Pittsburgh Penguins	Civic Arena	Recap
Sergei Brylin (3) – 12:04		First period		No scoring
No scoring		Second period		06:44 – Martin Straka (5)
Scott Niedermayer (1) – pp – 04:34		Third period		17:48 – Jaromir Jagr (1)
No scoring		First overtime period		08:59 – Jaromir Jagr (2)
Martin Brodeur 25 saves / 28 shots		Goalie stats		Tom Barasso 25 saves / 27 shots

May 4	Pittsburgh Penguins	4–2	New Jersey Devils	Continental Airlines Arena	Recap
No scoring		First period	No scoring
German Titov (1) – 03:06; Alex Kovalev (4) – 17:04; Jan Hrdina (3) – 19:43		Second period	06:22 – Jason Arnott (2)
Martin Straka (6) – 14:30		Third period	07:24 – Dave Andreychuk (2)
Tom Barasso 18 saves / 20 shots		Goalie stats	Martin Brodeur 9 saves / 13 shots

Pittsburgh won series 4–3

==== (2) Ottawa Senators vs. (7) Buffalo Sabres ====
This was the second playoff meeting between these two teams. Their only previous meeting was in the 1997 Eastern Conference Quarterfinals, where Buffalo won in seven games.

April 21	Buffalo Sabres	2–1	Ottawa Senators	Corel Centre	Recap
Michael Peca (1) – 04:32		First period	14:46 – pp – Wade Redden (1)
Curtis Brown (1) – pp – 11:24		Second period	No scoring
No scoring		Third period	No scoring
Dominik Hasek 40 saves / 41 shots		Goalie stats	Ron Tugnutt 13 saves / 15 shots

April 23	Buffalo Sabres	3–2	2OT	Ottawa Senators	Corel Centre	Recap
Joe Juneau (1) – 00:58		First period		No scoring
No scoring		Second period		02:53 – pp – Shawn McEachern (1); 12:04 – pp – Daniel Alfredsson (1)
Miroslav Satan (1) – pp – 06:43		Third period		No scoring
Miroslav Satan (2) – 10:35		Second overtime period		No scoring
Dominik Hasek 45 saves / 47 shots		Goalie stats		Damian Rhodes 36 saves / 39 shots

April 25	Ottawa Senators	0–3	Buffalo Sabres	Marine Midland Arena	Recap
No scoring		First period	04:03 – Dixon Ward (1)
No scoring		Second period	07:47 – Brian Holzinger (1); 12:33 – pp – Brian Holzinger (2)
No scoring		Third period	No scoring
Damian Rhodes 23 saves / 26 shots		Goalie stats	Dominik Hasek 31 saves / 31 shots

April 27	Ottawa Senators	3–4	Buffalo Sabres	Marine Midland Arena	Recap
No scoring		First period	08:29 – Erik Rasmussen (1); 10:17 – Vaclav Varada (1)
Jason York (1) – 06:24; Shawn McEachern (2) – 10:32		Second period	09:30 – Vaclav Varada (2)
Nelson Emerson (1) – 14:24		Third period	06:44 – pp – Alexei Zhitnik (1)
Ron Tugnutt 22 saves / 26 shots		Goalie stats	Dominik Hasek 40 saves / 43 shots

Buffalo won series 4–0

==== (3) Carolina Hurricanes vs. (6) Boston Bruins ====
This was the third playoff meeting between these two teams, with Boston winning both previous series. They last met in the 1991 Adams Division Semifinals where Boston defeated the Hartford Whalers in six games. This was the first playoff series for the Whalers/Hurricanes franchise since moving to Carolina in 1997. Game five was the last ever game played at the Greensboro Coliseum Complex. This was the only playoff series to be played in the arena.

April 22	Boston Bruins	2–0	Carolina Hurricanes	Greensboro Coliseum Complex	Recap
No scoring		First period	No scoring
No scoring		Second period	No scoring
Rob DiMaio (1) – 01:50; Ken Belanger (1) – 07:37		Third period	No scoring
Byron Dafoe 19 saves / 19 shots		Goalie stats	Arturs Irbe 27 saves / 29 shots

April 24	Boston Bruins	2–3	OT	Carolina Hurricanes	Greensboro Coliseum Complex	Recap
No scoring		First period		No scoring
Sergei Samsonov (1) – 02:56		Second period		08:24 – Ray Sheppard (1)
Steve Heinze (1) – 08:32		Third period		14:28 – Robert Kron (1)
No scoring		First overtime period		17:05 – Ray Sheppard (2)
Byron Dafoe 27 saves / 30 shots		Goalie stats		Arturs Irbe 22 saves / 24 shots

April 26	Carolina Hurricanes	3–2	Boston Bruins	FleetCenter	Recap
Gary Roberts (1) – 01:05		First period	09:48 – Sergei Samsonov (2)
Ray Sheppard (3) – pp – 15:20		Second period	13:07 – pp – Anson Carter (1)
Robert Kron (2) – 02:54		Third period	No scoring
Arturs Irbe 24 saves / 26 shots		Goalie stats	Byron Dafoe 18 saves / 21 shots

April 28	Carolina Hurricanes	1–4	Boston Bruins	FleetCenter	Recap
Ray Sheppard (4) – 04:21		First period	No scoring
No scoring		Second period	18:18 – Don Sweeney (1)
No scoring		Third period	03:54 – pp – Landon Wilson (1); 11:16 – Steve Heinze (2); 19:23 – en – Rob DiMaio (2)
Arturs Irbe 26 saves / 29 shots		Goalie stats	Byron Dafoe 22 saves / 23 shots

April 30	Boston Bruins	4–3	2OT	Carolina Hurricanes	Greensboro Coliseum Complex	Recap
No scoring		First period		03:49 – pp – Steve Chiasson (1)
No scoring		Second period		15:19 – Ray Sheppard (5)
Ray Bourque (1) – 00:34; Darren Van Impe (1) – pp – 01:59; P. J. Axelsson (1) – 02:26		Third period		18:15 – Sami Kapanen (1)
Anson Carter (2) – 14:45		Second overtime period		No scoring
Byron Dafoe 37 saves / 40 shots		Goalie stats		Arturs Irbe 48 saves / 52 shots

May 2	Carolina Hurricanes	0–2	Boston Bruins	FleetCenter	Recap
No scoring		First period	08:58 – pp – Joe Thornton (1)
No scoring		Second period	08:13 – Anson Carter (3)
No scoring		Third period	No scoring
Arturs Irbe 19 saves / 21 shots		Goalie stats	Byron Dafoe 31 saves / 31 shots

Boston won series 4–2

==== (4) Toronto Maple Leafs vs. (5) Philadelphia Flyers ====
This was the fourth playoff meeting between these two teams; with Philadelphia winning all three previous series. They last met in the 1977 Stanley Cup Quarterfinals, where Philadelphia won in six games.

April 22	Philadelphia Flyers	3–0	Toronto Maple Leafs	Air Canada Centre	Recap
Valeri Zelepukin (1) – 15:32		First period	No scoring
John LeClair (1) – pp – 11:32		Second period	No scoring
Eric Desjardins (1) – en – 19:43		Third period	No scoring
John Vanbiesbrouck 25 saves / 25 shots		Goalie stats	Curtis Joseph 21 saves / 23 shots

April 24	Philadelphia Flyers	1–2	Toronto Maple Leafs	Air Canada Centre	Recap
Keith Jones (1) – 11:09		First period	No scoring
No scoring		Second period	No scoring
No scoring		Third period	18:01 – Steve Thomas (1); 19:07 – Mats Sundin (1)
John Vanbiesbrouck 19 saves / 21 shots		Goalie stats	Curtis Joseph 24 saves / 25 shots

April 26	Toronto Maple Leafs	2–1	Philadelphia Flyers	First Union Center	Recap
Mike Johnson (1) – 16:26		First period	16:16 – Karl Dykhuis (1)
Steve Thomas (2) – pp – 00:40		Second period	No scoring
No scoring		Third period	No scoring
Curtis Joseph 40 saves / 41 shots		Goalie stats	John Vanbiesbrouck 19 saves / 21 shots

April 28	Toronto Maple Leafs	2–5	Philadelphia Flyers	First Union Center	Recap
Sergei Berezin (1) – pp – 09:47; Steve Sullivan (1) – pp – 12:22		First period	06:28 – Craig Berube (1); 11:44 – pp – John LeClair (2)
No scoring		Second period	03:19 – pp – Eric Desjardins (2); 17:57 – John LeClair (3)
No scoring		Third period	19:38 – en – Rod Brind'Amour (1)
Curtis Joseph 36 saves / 40 shots		Goalie stats	John Vanbiesbrouck 23 saves / 25 shots

April 30	Philadelphia Flyers	1–2	OT	Toronto Maple Leafs	Air Canada Centre	Recap
Keith Jones (2) – 01:52		First period		09:16 – pp – Dmitry Yushkevich (1)
No scoring		Second period		No scoring
No scoring		Third period		No scoring
No scoring		First overtime period		11:51 – Yanic Perreault (1)
John Vanbiesbrouck 32 saves / 34 shots		Goalie stats		Curtis Joseph 33 saves / 34 shots

May 2	Toronto Maple Leafs	1–0	Philadelphia Flyers	First Union Center	Recap
No scoring		First period	No scoring
No scoring		Second period	No scoring
Sergei Berezin (2) – pp – 19:00		Third period	No scoring
Curtis Joseph 26 saves / 26 shots		Goalie stats	John Vanbiesbrouck 19 saves / 20 shots

Toronto won series 4–2

=== Western Conference quarterfinals ===
==== (1) Dallas Stars vs. (8) Edmonton Oilers ====
This was the third consecutive playoff meeting and the fifth overall playoff match-up between these two teams; with the teams splitting the four previous series. Dallas won last year's Western Conference Semifinals in five games.

April 21	Edmonton Oilers	1–2	Dallas Stars	Reunion Arena	Recap
No scoring		First period	No scoring
Rem Murray (1) – 18:54		Second period	No scoring
No scoring		Third period	00:13 – Jere Lehtinen (1); 13:07 – Guy Carbonneau (1)
Tommy Salo 29 saves / 31 shots		Goalie stats	Ed Belfour 12 saves / 13 shots

April 23	Edmonton Oilers	2–3	Dallas Stars	Reunion Arena	Recap
No scoring		First period	02:34 – Guy Carbonneau (2)
No scoring		Second period	No scoring
Mike Grier (1) – 08:32; Doug Weight (1) – 16:49		Third period	10:20 – Jere Lehtinen (2); 14:22 – Jamie Langenbrunner (1)
Tommy Salo 31 saves / 34 shots		Goalie stats	Ed Belfour 17 saves / 19 shots

April 25	Dallas Stars	3–2	Edmonton Oilers	Skyreach Centre	Recap
No scoring		First period	15:25 – pp – Ryan Smyth (1)
No scoring		Second period	No scoring
Mike Keane (1) – 06:15; Mike Modano (1) –10:20; Joe Nieuwendyk (1) – 12:32		Third period	00:24 – pp – Ryan Smyth (2)
Ed Belfour 20 saves / 22 shots		Goalie stats	Tommy Salo 25 saves / 28 shots

April 27	Dallas Stars	3–2	3OT	Edmonton Oilers	Skyreach Centre	Recap
No scoring		First period		No scoring
Joe Nieuwendyk (2) – pp – 19:22		Second period		04:47 – Ryan Smyth (3)
Jamie Langenbrunner (2) – pp – 11:05		Third period		06:33 – Todd Marchant (1)
Joe Nieuwendyk (3) – 17:34		Third overtime period		No scoring
Ed Belfour 37 saves / 39 shots		Goalie stats		Tommy Salo 53 saves / 56 shots

Dallas won series 4–0

==== (2) Colorado Avalanche vs. (7) San Jose Sharks ====
This was the first playoff meeting between these two teams. Colorado won three of the four games during this year's regular season series. Due to the Columbine High School massacre, games one and two were played in San Jose, while games three and four were played in Colorado.

April 24	Colorado Avalanche	3–1	San Jose Sharks	San Jose Arena	Recap
Joe Sakic (1) – pp – 16:16		First period	No scoring
Sandis Ozolinsh (1) – pp – 14:39		Second period	No scoring
Joe Sakic (2) – 02:26		Third period	14:05 – pp – Jeff Friesen (1)
Patrick Roy 42 saves / 43 shots		Goalie stats	Mike Vernon 28 saves / 31 shots

April 26	Colorado Avalanche	2–1	OT	San Jose Sharks	San Jose Arena	Recap
No scoring		First period		No scoring
No scoring		Second period		No scoring
Adam Foote (1) – pp – 14:20		Third period		03:02 – Vincent Damphousse (1)
Milan Hejduk (1) 07:53		First overtime period		No scoring
Patrick Roy 23 saves / 24 shots		Goalie stats		Mike Vernon 34 saves / 36 shots

April 28	San Jose Sharks	4–2	Colorado Avalanche	McNichols Sports Arena	Recap
Mike Ricci (1) – pp – 15:18		First period	No scoring
No scoring		Second period	06:08 – Peter Forsberg (1)
Marco Sturm (1) – 09:52; Marco Sturm (2) – 13:08; Owen Nolan (1) – en – 19:21		Third period	18:09 – pp – Adam Deadmarsh (1)
Mike Vernon 34 saves / 36 shots		Goalie stats	Patrick Roy 29 saves / 32 shots

April 30	San Jose Sharks	7–3	Colorado Avalanche	McNichols Sports Arena	Recap
No scoring		First period	07:27 – Adam Deadmarsh (2)
Tony Granato (1) – 09:38; Bill Houlder (1) – pp – 10:06; Patrick Marleau (1) – pp – 18:01		Second period	04:53 – Adam Foote (2); 15:35 – Milan Hejduk (2)
Alexander Korolyuk (1) – 01:54; Vincent Damphousse (2) – sh – 04:17; Mike Ricci (2) – 08:55; Vincent Damphousse (3) – sh – 12:01		Third period	No scoring
Mike Vernon 33 saves / 36 shots		Goalie stats	Patrick Roy 19 saves / 25 shots Craig Billington 5 saves / 6 shots

May 1	San Jose Sharks	2–6	Colorado Avalanche	McNichols Sports Arena	Recap
No scoring		First period	04:31 – pp – Peter Forsberg (2)
No scoring		Second period	11:15 – pp – Theoren Fleury (1); 12:55 – Joe Sakic (3); 13:44 – Claude Lemieux (1); 19:58 – pp – Adam Deadmarsh (3)
Patrick Marleau (2) – pp – 04:35; Bill Houlder (2) – pp – 19:36		Third period	08:27 – Theoren Fleury (2)
Steve Shields 30 saves / 36 shots		Goalie stats	Patrick Roy 29 saves / 31 shots

May 3	Colorado Avalanche	3–2	OT	San Jose Sharks	San Jose Arena	Recap
No scoring		First period		No scoring
Theoren Fleury (3) – 12:52		Second period		16:29 – pp – Bill Houlder (3)
Sandis Ozolinsh (2) – pp – 13:29		Third period		11:51 – Jeff Friesen (2)
Milan Hejduk (3) – 13:12		First overtime period		No scoring
Patrick Roy 27 saves / 29 shots		Goalie stats		Mike Vernon 30 saves / 33 shots

Colorado won series 4–2

==== (3) Detroit Red Wings vs. (6) Mighty Ducks of Anaheim ====
This was the second playoff meeting between these two teams. Their only previous meeting was in the 1997 Western Conference Semifinals, where Detroit won in a four-game sweep.

April 21	Mighty Ducks of Anaheim	3–5	Detroit Red Wings	Joe Louis Arena	Recap
Marty McInnis (1) – pp – 06:41		First period	11:06 – Steve Yzerman (1); 17:30 – Wendel Clark (1)
Paul Kariya (1) – 01:45		Second period	00:31 – pp – Steve Yzerman (2); 16:49 – Doug Brown (1)
Teemu Selanne (1) – 13:03		Third period	18:42 – en – Steve Yzerman (3)
Guy Hebert 23 saves / 26 shots Tom Askey 9 saves / 11 shots		Goalie stats	Chris Osgood 26 saves / 29 shots

April 23	Mighty Ducks of Anaheim	1–5	Detroit Red Wings	Joe Louis Arena	Recap
No scoring		First period	01:00 – Brendan Shanahan (1); 10:14 – pp – Brendan Shanahan (2); 13:43 – Tomas Holmstrom (1); 19:17 – Doug Brown (2)
No scoring		Second period	09:42 – pp – Steve Yzerman (4)
Teemu Selanne (2) – pp – 09:11		Third period	No scoring
Guy Hebert 31 saves / 36 shots		Goalie stats	Chris Osgood 30 saves / 31 shots

April 25	Detroit Red Wings	4–2	Mighty Ducks of Anaheim	Arrowhead Pond of Anaheim	Recap
Sergei Fedorov (1) – 01:43		First period	09:33 – pp – Marty McInnis (2); 15:14 – pp – Jason Marshall (1)
Tomas Holmstrom (2) – pp – 01:51; Steve Yzerman (5) – pp – 04:24		Second period	No scoring
Vyacheslav Kozlov (1) – 01:54		Third period	No scoring
Chris Osgood 22 saves / 24 shots		Goalie stats	Guy Hebert 20 saves / 24 shots

April 27	Detroit Red Wings	3–0	Mighty Ducks of Anaheim	Arrowhead Pond of Anaheim	Recap
No scoring		First period	No scoring
Tomas Holmstrom (3) – pp – 16:44		Second period	No scoring
Brendan Shanahan (3) – 11:51; Vyacheslav Kozlov (2) – 14:57		Third period	No scoring
Chris Osgood 31 saves / 31 shots		Goalie stats	Guy Hebert 35 saves / 38 shots

Detroit won series 4–0

==== (4) Phoenix Coyotes vs. (5) St. Louis Blues ====
This was the first playoff meeting between these two teams.

April 22	St. Louis Blues	3–1	Phoenix Coyotes	America West Arena	Recap
Al MacInnis (1) – 02:22		First period	No scoring
Jamie Rivers (1) – pp – 17:24		Second period	No scoring
Scott Pellerin (1) – en – 19:18		Third period	18:08 – Robert Reichel (1)
Grant Fuhr 26 saves / 27 shots		Goalie stats	Nikolai Khabibulin 22 saves / 24 shots

April 24	St. Louis Blues	3–4	OT	Phoenix Coyotes	America West Arena	Recap
Al MacInnis (2) –pp – 05:31		First period		No scoring
Pierre Turgeon (1) – 12:43		Second period		05:53 – Dallas Drake (1)
Pavol Demitra (1) – pp – 16:42		Third period		02:15 – pp – Teppo Numminen (1); 14:26 – Keith Carney (1)
No scoring		First overtime period		08:58 – Shane Doan (1)
Grant Fuhr 24 saves / 28 shots		Goalie stats		Nikolai Khabibulin 31 saves / 34 shots

April 25	Phoenix Coyotes	5–4	St. Louis Blues	Kiel Center	Recap
Dallas Drake (2) – 03:46; Keith Tkachuk (1) – pp – 07:19; Louie DeBrusk (1) – 08:31		First period	No scoring
Louie DeBrusk (2) – 02:35		Second period	16:43 – pp – Pavol Demitra (2); 16:55 – pp – Terry Yake (1)
Shane Doan (2) – en – 19:09		Third period	05:51 – pp – Geoff Courtnall (1); 19:45 – Blair Atcheynum (1)
Nikolai Khabibulin 34 saves / 38 shots		Goalie stats	Grant Fuhr 6 saves / 10 shots Jamie McLennan 7 saves / 7 shots

April 27	Phoenix Coyotes	2–1	St. Louis Blues	Kiel Center	Recap
No scoring		First period	No scoring
Greg Adams (1) – 11:00; Dallas Drake (3) – pp – 19:25		Second period	05:58 – Pascal Rheaume (1)
No scoring		Third period	No scoring
Nikolai Khabibulin 27 saves / 28 shots		Goalie stats	Grant Fuhr 18 saves / 20 shots

April 30	St. Louis Blues	2–1	OT	Phoenix Coyotes	America West Arena	Recap
No scoring		First period		No scoring
No scoring		Second period		16:25 – pp – Dallas Drake (4)
Al MacInnis (3) – pp – 11:50		Third period		No scoring
Scott Young (1) – 05:43		First overtime period		No scoring
Grant Fuhr 26 saves / 27 shots		Goalie stats		Nikolai Khabibulin 41 saves / 43 shots

May 2	Phoenix Coyotes	3–5	St. Louis Blues	Kiel Center	Recap
Mike Stapleton (1) – 02:20		First period	02:56 – Craig Conroy (1); 08:25 – pp – Scott Young (2)
Stephen Leach (1) – 12:18; Teppo Numminen (2) – pp – 13:51		Second period	17:00 – pp – Chris Pronger (1)
No scoring		Third period	08:59 – Jeff Finley (1); 15:49 – Craig Conroy (2)
Nikolai Khabibulin 29 saves / 34 shots		Goalie stats	Grant Fuhr 18 saves / 21 shots

May 4	St. Louis Blues	1–0	OT	Phoenix Coyotes	America West Arena	Recap
No scoring		First period		No scoring
No scoring		Second period		No scoring
No scoring		Third period		No scoring
17:59 – Pierre Turgeon (2)		First overtime period		No scoring
Grant Fuhr 35 saves / 35 shots		Goalie stats		Nikolai Khabibulin 33 saves / 34 shots

St. Louis won series 4–3

== Conference semifinals ==
=== Eastern Conference semifinals ===
==== (4) Toronto Maple Leafs vs. (8) Pittsburgh Penguins ====
This was the third playoff meeting between these two teams; with Toronto winning both previous series. They last met in the 1977 Preliminary Round, where Toronto won in three games.

May 7	Pittsburgh Penguins	2–0	Toronto Maple Leafs	Air Canada Centre	Recap
Dan Kesa (1) – pp – 10:52		First period	No scoring
No scoring		Second period	No scoring
German Titov (2) – en – 19:23		Third period	No scoring
Tom Barasso 20 saves / 20 shots		Goalie stats	Curtis Joseph 17 saves / 18 shots

May 9	Pittsburgh Penguins	2–4	Toronto Maple Leafs	Air Canada Centre	Recap
No scoring		First period	06:06 – Lonny Bohonos (1); 14:41 – pp – Mats Sundin (2)
Kip Miller (2) – 09:12		Second period	11:49 – Mats Sundin (3)
German Titov (3) – 12:42		Third period	16:50 – Steve Thomas (3)
Tom Barasso 21 saves / 25 shots		Goalie stats	Curtis Joseph 25 saves / 27 shots

May 11	Toronto Maple Leafs	3–4	Pittsburgh Penguins	Civic Arena	Recap
No scoring		First period	No scoring
Mike Johnson (2) – 08:21; Derek King (1) – 12:19; Adam Mair (1) – 12:58		Second period	10:42 – pp – Kevin Hatcher (2); 12:45 – Bobby Dollas (1)
No scoring		Third period	09:03 – pp – Jaromir Jagr (3); 10:43 – Jiri Slegr (1)
Curtis Joseph 17 saves / 21 shots		Goalie stats	Tom Barasso 26 saves / 29 shots

May 13	Toronto Maple Leafs	3–2	OT	Pittsburgh Penguins	Civic Arena	Recap
No scoring		First period		05:00 – Jaromir Jagr (4)
Mats Sundin (4) – 16:57		Second period		No scoring
Lonny Bohonos (2) – 05:28		Third period		07:10 – Brad Werenka (1)
Sergei Berezin (3) – 02:18		First overtime period		No scoring
Curtis Joseph 12 saves / 14 shots		Goalie stats		Tom Barasso 27 saves / 30 shots

May 15	Pittsburgh Penguins	1–4	Toronto Maple Leafs	Air Canada Centre	Recap
No scoring		First period	07:04 – Sylvain Cote (1); 10:48 – Mike Johnson (3)
Jan Hrdina (4) – 14:13		Second period	13:44 – Steve Thomas (4)
No scoring		Third period	15:00 – Sergei Berezin (4)
Tom Barasso 16 saves / 20 shots		Goalie stats	Curtis Joseph 15 saves / 16 shots

May 17	Toronto Maple Leafs	4–3	OT	Pittsburgh Penguins	Civic Arena	Recap
No scoring		First period		05:04 – pp – Rob Brown (2); 14:06 – Alexei Kovalev (5)
Lonny Bohonos (3) – 03:26; Garry Valk (1) – 03:52; Sergei Berezin (5) – 11:43		Second period		14:41 – Jaromir Jagr (5)
No scoring		Third period		No scoring
Garry Valk (2) – 01:57		First overtime period		No scoring
Curtis Joseph 25 saves / 28 shots		Goalie stats		Tom Barasso 26 saves / 30 shots

Toronto won series 4–2

==== (6) Boston Bruins vs. (7) Buffalo Sabres ====
This was the seventh playoff meeting between these two teams; with Boston winning five of the six previous series. They last met in the 1993 Adams Division Semifinals, where Buffalo won in a four-game sweep.

May 6	Buffalo Sabres	2–4	Boston Bruins	FleetCenter	Recap
No scoring		First period	13:59 – pp – Jason Allison (1)
Alexei Zhitnik (2) – pp – 18:29		Second period	15:21 – Dmitri Khristich (1); 19:46 – pp – Joe Thornton (2)
Jason Woolley (1) – 09:37		Third period	19:48 – en – Dmitri Khristich (2)
Dominik Hasek 18 saves / 21 shots		Goalie stats	Byron Dafoe 28 saves / 30 shots

May 9	Buffalo Sabres	3–1	Boston Bruins	FleetCenter	Recap
Michael Peca (2) – 01:51		First period	No scoring
Curtis Brown (2) – pp – 05:57		Second period	No scoring
Dixon Ward (2) – en – 19:23		Third period	14:03 – pp – Don Sweeney (2)
Dominik Hasek 28 saves / 29 shots		Goalie stats	Byron Dafoe 26 saves / 28 shots

May 12	Boston Bruins	2–3	Buffalo Sabres	Marine Midland Arena	Recap
Steve Heinze (3) – pp – 08:47; Anson Carter (4) – 12:48		First period	01:37 – Jason Woolley (2)
No scoring		Second period	No scoring
No scoring		Third period	06:44 – Rhett Warrener (1); 09:38 – Dixon Ward (3)
Byron Dafoe 22 saves / 25 shots		Goalie stats	Dominik Hasek 19 saves / 21 shots

May 14	Boston Bruins	0–3	Buffalo Sabres	Marine Midland Arena	Recap
No scoring		First period	No scoring
No scoring		Second period	08:20 – pp – Alexei Zhitnik (3); 19:43 – Vaclav Varada (3)
No scoring		Third period	11:39 – sh – Michael Peca (3)
Byron Dafoe 36 saves / 39 shots		Goalie stats	Dominik Hasek 24 saves / 24 shots

May 16	Buffalo Sabres	3–5	Boston Bruins	FleetCenter	Recap
Curtis Brown (3) – pp – 00:37		First period	09:01 – Don Sweeney (3)
No scoring		Second period	01:15 – Sergei Samsonov (3); 10:19 – Mattias Timander (1); 13:34 – Dmitri Khristich (3)
Wayne Primeau (1) – 04:58; Joe Juneau (2) – 13:25		Third period	19:17 – Jason Allison (2)
Dominik Hasek 22 saves / 26 shots Dwayne Roloson 7 saves / 8 shots		Goalie stats	Byron Dafoe 20 saves / 23 shots

May 18	Boston Bruins	2–3	Buffalo Sabres	Marine Midland Arena	Recap
Steve Heinze (4) – pp – 12:49		First period	05:15 – pp – Michael Peca (4); 17:29 – Wayne Primeau (2)
No scoring		Second period	01:08 – Curtis Brown (4)
Joe Thornton (3) – 18:57		Third period	No scoring
Byron Dafoe 18 saves / 21 shots		Goalie stats	Dominik Hasek 23 saves / 25 shots

Buffalo won series 4–2

=== Western Conference semifinals ===
==== (1) Dallas Stars vs. (5) St. Louis Blues ====
This was the eleventh playoff meeting between these two teams; with the teams splitting the ten previous series. They last met in the 1994 Western Conference Quarterfinals, where Dallas won in a four-game sweep.

May 6	St. Louis Blues	0–3	Dallas Stars	Reunion Arena	Recap
No scoring		First period	02:25 – Pat Verbeek (1)
No scoring		Second period	00:49 – Brett Hull (1)
No scoring		Third period	19:28 – sh-en – Mike Modano (2)
Grant Fuhr 22 saves / 24 shots		Goalie stats	Ed Belfour 23 saves / 23 shots

May 8	St. Louis Blues	4–5	OT	Dallas Stars	Reunion Arena	Recap
Pavol Demitra (3) – 19:27		First period		07:50 – Jamie Langenbrunner (3)
Scott Young (3) – 00:53; Pierre Turgeon (3) – 14:23; Pavol Demitra (4) – pp – 17:29		Second period		05:35 – Joe Nieuwendyk (4); 09:54 – Mike Keane (2)
No scoring		Third period		04:22 – Jere Lehtinen (3)
No scoring		First overtime period		08:22 – Joe Nieuwendyk (5)
Grant Fuhr 20 saves / 25 shots		Goalie stats		Ed Belfour 30 saves / 34 shots

May 10	Dallas Stars	2–3	OT	St. Louis Blues	Kiel Center	Recap
Brett Hull (2) – pp – 03:07		First period		No scoring
No scoring		Second period		02:58 – Mike Eastwood (1)
Darryl Sydor (1) – 09:08		Third period		04:52 – Jochen Hecht (1)
No scoring		First overtime period		02:43 – Pavol Demitra (5)
Ed Belfour 25 saves / 28 shots		Goalie stats		Grant Fuhr 16 saves / 18 shots

May 12	Dallas Stars	2–3	OT	St. Louis Blues	Kiel Center	Recap
Mike Modano (3) – 00:59		First period		No scoring
No scoring		Second period		05:02 – Jochen Hecht (2); 07:41 – pp – Geoff Courtnall (2)
Jere Lehtinen (4) – 00:40		Third period		No scoring
No scoring		First overtime period		05:52 – Pierre Turgeon (4)
Ed Belfour 27 saves / 30 shots		Goalie stats		Grant Fuhr 23 saves / 25 shots

May 15	St. Louis Blues	1–3	Dallas Stars	Reunion Arena	Recap
No scoring		First period	03:47 – sh – Jere Lehtinen (5); 09:43 – pp – Jamie Langenbrunner (4)
Scott Young (4) – 11:29		Second period	10:52 – pp – Joe Nieuwendyk (6)
No scoring		Third period	No scoring
Grant Fuhr 13 saves / 16 shots		Goalie stats	Ed Belfour 30 saves / 31 shots

May 17	Dallas Stars	2–1	OT	St. Louis Blues	Kiel Center	Recap
No scoring		First period		No scoring
No scoring		Second period		06:51 – Al MacInnis (4)
Derek Plante (1) – 13:58		Third period		No scoring
Mike Modano (4) – 02:21		First overtime period		No scoring
Ed Belfour 28 saves / 29 shots		Goalie stats		Grant Fuhr 27 saves / 29 shots

Dallas won series 4–2

==== (2) Colorado Avalanche vs. (3) Detroit Red Wings ====
This was the third playoff meeting between these two teams; with the teams splitting the two previous series. They last met in the 1997 Western Conference Finals, where Detroit won in six games.

May 7	Detroit Red Wings	3–2	OT	Colorado Avalanche	McNichols Sports Arena	Recap
Steve Yzerman (6) – pp – 03:54		First period		10:51 – pp – Theoren Fleury (4); 12:34 – Adam Deadmarsh (4)
Vyacheslav Kozlov (3) – pp – 16:30		Second period		No scoring
No scoring		Third period		No scoring
Kirk Maltby (1) – 04:18		First overtime period		No scoring
Bill Ranford 37 saves / 39 shots		Goalie stats		Patrick Roy 31 saves / 34 shots

May 9	Detroit Red Wings	4–0	Colorado Avalanche	McNichols Sports Arena	Recap
Steve Yzerman (7) – 06:11		First period	No scoring
Steve Yzerman (8) – 05:35		Second period	No scoring
Nicklas Lidstrom (1) – pp – 10:45; Wendel Clark (2) – pp – 11:23		Third period	No scoring
Bill Ranford 28 saves / 28 shots		Goalie stats	Patrick Roy 33 saves / 37 shots

May 11	Colorado Avalanche	5–3	Detroit Red Wings	Joe Louis Arena	Recap
Claude Lemieux (2) – pp – 11:00; Theoren Fleury (5) – 16:59		First period	07:07 – Steve Yzerman (9)
Dale Hunter (1) – 02:50; Chris Drury (1) – 03:42; Aaron Miller (1) – 05:05		Second period	09:09 – Tomas Holmstrom (4)
No scoring		Third period	19:25 – pp – Vyacheslav Kozlov (4)
Patrick Roy 44 saves / 47 shots		Goalie stats	Bill Ranford 19 saves / 24 shots Norm Maracle 7 saves / 7 shots

May 13	Colorado Avalanche	6–2	Detroit Red Wings	Joe Louis Arena	Recap
Chris Drury (2) – 01:28		First period	No scoring
Adam Deadmarsh (5) – 07:07; Milan Hejduk (4) – pp – 14:04		Second period	No scoring
Peter Forsberg (3) – 08:21; Valeri Kamensky (1) – pp – 11:28; Adam Deadmarsh (6) – 16:36		Third period	14:40 – pp – Vyacheslav Kozlov (5); 19:17 – Vyacheslav Kozlov (6)
Patrick Roy 31 saves / 33 shots		Goalie stats	Bill Ranford 11 saves / 14 shots Norm Maracle 7 saves / 10 shots

May 16	Detroit Red Wings	0–3	Colorado Avalanche	McNichols Sports Arena	Recap
No scoring		First period	11:06 – Jeff Odgers (1)
No scoring		Second period	04:23 – Adam Deadmarsh (7); 07:19 – pp – Peter Forsberg (4)
No scoring		Third period	No scoring
Chris Osgood 23 saves / 26 shots		Goalie stats	Patrick Roy 36 saves / 36 shots

May 18	Colorado Avalanche	5–2	Detroit Red Wings	Joe Louis Arena	Recap
Peter Forsberg (5) – 16:15		First period	No scoring
Milan Hejduk (5) – 04:12; Chris Drury (3) – 05:46; Joe Sakic (4) – sh – 08:14		Second period	17:24 – pp – Nicklas Lidstrom (2); 17:53 – Darren McCarty (1)
Peter Forsberg (6) – 13:31		Third period	No scoring
Patrick Roy 35 saves / 37 shots		Goalie stats	Chris Osgood 26 saves / 31 shots

Colorado won series 4–2

== Conference finals ==
=== Eastern Conference final ===
==== (4) Toronto Maple Leafs vs. (7) Buffalo Sabres ====
This was the first playoff meeting between these two teams. Toronto made their third appearance in the Conference Finals and first since losing to Vancouver in five games in the 1994 Western Conference Final. Buffalo made their second consecutive and third overall semifinal/conference final appearance since the league began using a 16-team or greater playoff format in 1980 after losing to Washington in six games in last year's Eastern Conference Final.

The Sabres defeated the Maple Leafs in five games. In game one the Sabres backup goaltender Dwayne Roloson filled in for the injured Dominik Hasek. Leading 3–2 midway through the game Toronto appeared to be in control, but Stu Barnes tied the game for Buffalo at 14:37 of the second period. The Sabres went on to score twice in the third period on goals by Curtis Brown and Geoff Sanderson, as Buffalo held on to win 5–4. In game two the Maple Leafs got two goals 18 seconds apart in the first period as Steve Sullivan and Sylvain Cote scored. Toronto held a 4–3 lead halfway through the third period with Buffalo pressing, the Maple Leafs scored twice to seal a 6–3 win. Dominik Hasek returned for the Sabres in game three but it was the away team that netted the first goal as Maple Leafs forward Yanic Perreault scored late in the first period. Buffalo was not to be denied and they scored three goals early in the second period and the Sabres held on to win the game 4–2. Buffalo came out flying again in game four holding a 5–0 lead after two periods. Hasek's shutout bid was erased when Mats Sundin scored on a penalty shot; Buffalo won the game 5–2, as Dominik Hasek made 31 saves in the victory. After a scoreless first period Steve Sullivan got Toronto on the board first in game five, the teams traded goals in the second period and the game was tied 2–2 going into the third period. Erik Rasmussen broke the tie with a goal in the middle of the third period and Dixon Ward added a late shorthanded empty net goal as the Sabres went on to win 4–2 and take the series four games to one. The Sabres advanced to the Stanley Cup Finals for the first time since 1975.

May 23	Buffalo Sabres	5–4	Toronto Maple Leafs	Air Canada Centre	Recap
Vaclav Varada (4) – 04:23; Dixon Ward (4) – 07:28		First period	04:32 – Mats Sundin (5)
Stu Barnes (1) – pp – 14:37		Second period	05:47 – pp – Mats Sundin (6); 10:30 – pp – Bryan Berard (1)
Curtis Brown (5) – 05:21; Geoff Sanderson (1) – 11:02		Third period	13:59 – pp – Steve Thomas (5)
Dwayne Roloson 28 saves / 32 shots		Goalie stats	Curtis Joseph 16 saves / 21 shots

May 25	Buffalo Sabres	3–6	Toronto Maple Leafs	Air Canada Centre	Recap
No scoring		First period	10:28 – Steve Sullivan (2); 10:46 – Sylvain Cote (2)
Jason Woolley (3) – pp – 10:03		Second period	15:25 – Sergei Berezin (6)
Stu Barnes (2) – pp – 06:53; Stu Barnes (3) – pp – 09:47		Third period	01:57 – Yanic Perreault (2); 12:17 – pp – Steve Thomas (6); 19:30 – en – Garry Valk (3)
Dwayne Roloson 22 saves / 27 shots		Goalie stats	Curtis Joseph 30 saves / 33 shots

May 27	Toronto Maple Leafs	2–4	Buffalo Sabres	Marine Midland Arena	Recap
Yanic Perreault (3) – 16:08		First period	No scoring
Alexander Karpovtsev (1) – pp – 13:09		Second period	03:07 – Miroslav Satan (3); 03:45 – sh – Joe Juneau (3); 07:38 – pp – Stu Barnes (4)
No scoring		Third period	19:31 – en – Curtis Brown (6)
Curtis Joseph 20 saves / 23 shots		Goalie stats	Dominik Hasek 24 saves / 26 shots

May 29	Toronto Maple Leafs	2–5	Buffalo Sabres	Marine Midland Arena	Recap
No scoring		First period	16:15 – sh – Dixon Ward (5)
No scoring		Second period	02:51 – Brian Holzinger (3); 05:04 – Rob Ray (1); 05:26 – Geoff Sanderson (2); 14:10 – Geoff Sanderson (3)
Mats Sundin (7) – 06:59; Mats Sundin (8) – pp – 18:03		Third period	No scoring
Curtis Joseph 22 saves / 27 shots Glenn Healy 5 saves / 5 shots		Goalie stats	Dominik Hasek 31 saves / 33 shots

May 31	Buffalo Sabres	4–2	Toronto Maple Leafs	Air Canada Centre	Recap
No scoring		First period	No scoring
Curtis Brown (7) – 07:14; Vaclav Varada (5) – pp – 16:44		Second period	00:33 – pp – Steve Sullivan (3); 12:54 – Kris King (1)
Erik Rasmussen (2) – 11:35; Dixon Ward (6) – sh-en – 18:58		Third period	No scoring
Dominik Hasek 20 saves / 22 shots		Goalie stats	Curtis Joseph 20 saves / 23 shots

Buffalo won series 4–1

=== Western Conference final ===
==== (1) Dallas Stars vs. (2) Colorado Avalanche ====
This was the first playoff meeting between these two teams. Dallas made their second consecutive and sixth semifinal/conference final appearance since the league began using a 16-team or greater playoff format in 1980 after losing to Detroit in six games in last year's Western Conference Final. Colorado made their third Conference Finals appearance in four years and their fifth appearance overall; they last made it to the Conference Finals in the 1997 Western Conference Final, where they lost in six games to Detroit.

The Stars defeated the Avalanche in seven games. In game one the Stars jumped out to a 1–0 lead on Brett Hull's goal at 8:42 of the first period. The Avalanche came back to tie the game in the second period on Peter Forsberg's goal at 14:07. Valeri Kamensky scored the go ahead goal with 5:58 remaining in the game, as Colorado hung on to win 2–1. With the score tied at 2–2 in game two Joe Nieuwendyk gave Dallas a 3–2 lead with a goal at 11:52 of the third period. Mike Modano added a power-play goal with 3:32 remaining as the Stars won 4–2 to tie the series at 1–1. In game three Ed Belfour stopped all 34 Colorado shots he faced and Dallas won 3–0. The Avalanche came back in game four and led 2–1 with under five minutes remaining in the third period until Brett Hull scored at 16:07 to tie the score and send the game into overtime. In the extra period 22-year-old rookie Chris Drury scored at 19:29 to give Colorado a 3–2 win and tie the series at two games apiece.

Game five was the highest scoring game in the series as the two teams combined for 12 goals on just 56 shots. Chris Drury and Valeri Kamensky both scored twice as the Avalanche won 7–5. In game six Claude Lemieux got the Avalanche on the board first at 19:25 of the first period. The Stars responded early in the second on Jere Lehtinen's goal at 1:55. In the third period Jamie Langenbrunner scored twice at 6:49 and again at 17:15, 14 seconds later Richard Matvichuk scored to give Dallas a 4–1 lead which they hung on to. Ed Belfour stopped 26 of 27 Colorado shots (game six was the last NHL game to be played at the McNichols Arena as the Avalanche moved into the new Pepsi Center at the start of next season). The Stars dominated game seven building a 4–0 lead in the first 46 minutes and 18 seconds of the game. Mike Keane scored twice and Jamie Langenbrunner and Jere Lehtinen both had goals. Joe Sakic scored for Colorado with a goal at 13:58 of the third period. Dallas hung on and won the game 4–1 and the series four games to three. With the win the Stars advanced to the Cup Finals for the first time since 1991 when they were the Minnesota North Stars.

May 22	Colorado Avalanche	2–1	Dallas Stars	Reunion Arena	Recap
No scoring		First period	08:42 – Brett Hull (3)
Peter Forsberg (7) – 14:07		Second period	No scoring
Valeri Kamensky (2) – 14:02		Third period	No scoring
Patrick Roy 30 saves / 31 shots		Goalie stats	Ed Belfour 26 saves / 28 shots

May 24	Colorado Avalanche	2–4	Dallas Stars	Reunion Arena	Recap
Sandis Ozolinsh (3) – pp – 10:32		First period	14:11 – Dave Reid (1)
Milan Hejduk (6) – 14:59		Second period	04:56 – Sergei Zubov (1)
No scoring		Third period	11:52 – Joe Nieuwendyk (7); 16:28 – pp – Mike Modano (5)
Patrick Roy 41 saves / 45 shots		Goalie stats	Ed Belfour 17 saves / 19 shots

May 26	Dallas Stars	3–0	Colorado Avalanche	McNichols Sports Arena	Recap
No scoring		First period	No scoring
Joe Nieuwendyk (8) – 02:22		Second period	No scoring
Jamie Langenbrunner (5) – 10:44; Dave Reid (2) – 16:05		Third period	No scoring
Ed Belfour 34 saves / 34 shots		Goalie stats	Patrick Roy 23 saves / 26 shots

May 28	Dallas Stars	2–3	OT	Colorado Avalanche	McNichols Sports Arena	Recap
No scoring		First period		04:06 – Joe Sakic (5); 04:54 – Shjon Podein (1)
Jamie Langenbrunner (6) – pp – 09:48		Second period		No scoring
Brett Hull (4) – 16:07		Third period		No scoring
No scoring		First overtime period		19:29 – Chris Drury (4)
Ed Belfour 42 saves / 45 shots		Goalie stats		Patrick Roy 43 saves / 45 shots

May 30	Colorado Avalanche	7–5	Dallas Stars	Reunion Arena	Recap
Valeri Kamensky (3) – 03:28; Sandis Ozolinsh (4) – 19:27		First period	12:00 – sh – Mike Keane (3); 15:05 – Darryl Sydor (2)
Chris Drury (5) – 03:25; Adam Deadmarsh (8) – pp – 10:25		Second period	01:51 – pp – Joe Nieuwendyk (9)
Valeri Kamensky (4) – 07:26; Chris Drury (6) – 13:16; Peter Forsberg (8) – en – 19:26		Third period	09:32 – pp – Brett Hull (5); 10:57 – Pat Verbeek (2)
Patrick Roy 25 saves / 30 shots		Goalie stats	Ed Belfour 19 saves / 25 shots

June 1	Dallas Stars	4–1	Colorado Avalanche	McNichols Sports Arena	Recap
No scoring		First period	19:25 – Claude Lemieux (3)
Jere Lehtinen (6) – 01:55		Second period	No scoring
Jamie Langenbrunner (7) – 06:49; Jamie Langenbrunner (8) – pp – 17:15; Richard Matvichuk (1) – 17:29		Third period	No scoring
Ed Belfour 26 saves / 27 shots		Goalie stats	Patrick Roy 36 saves / 40 shots

June 4	Colorado Avalanche	1–4	Dallas Stars	Reunion Arena	Recap
No scoring		First period	08:25 – Jamie Langenbrunner (9)
No scoring		Second period	11:13 – Mike Keane (4); 15:18 – Mike Keane (5)
Joe Sakic (6) – 13:58		Third period	06:18 – Jere Lehtinen (7)
Patrick Roy 21 saves / 25 shots		Goalie stats	Ed Belfour 18 saves / 19 shots

Dallas won series 4–3

== Stanley Cup Finals ==
This was the third playoff meeting between these two teams; with the teams splitting the two previous series. They last met in the 1981 Stanley Cup Quarterfinals, where the Minnesota North Stars won in five games. Dallas made their third Finals appearance. They last advanced to the Finals in 1991, where the Minnesota North Stars lost to the Pittsburgh Penguins in six games. Buffalo made their second Finals appearance. They last advanced to the Finals in 1975, where they lost to the Philadelphia Flyers in six games. These teams split their two-game regular season series. This was the first Finals since 1996 to feature two teams that had not previously won the Stanley Cup, this did not occur again until 2007.

June 8	Buffalo Sabres	3–2	OT	Dallas Stars	Reunion Arena	Recap
No scoring		First period		10:17 – pp – Brett Hull (6)
No scoring		Second period		No scoring
Stu Barnes (5) – 08:33; Wayne Primeau (3) – pp – 13:37		Third period		19:11 – Jere Lehtinen (8)
Jason Woolley (4) – 15:30		First overtime period		No scoring
Dominik Hasek 35 saves / 37 shots		Goalie stats		Ed Belfour 21 saves / 24 shots

June 10	Buffalo Sabres	2–4	Dallas Stars	Reunion Arena	Recap
No scoring		First period	No scoring
Michael Peca (5) – pp – 07:27		Second period	18:26 – Jamie Langenbrunner (10)
Alexei Zhitnik (4) – pp – 05:36		Third period	04:25 – Craig Ludwig (1); 17:10 – Brett Hull (7); 19:34 – en – Derian Hatcher (1)
Dominik Hasek 27 saves / 30 shots		Goalie stats	Ed Belfour 19 saves / 21 shots

June 12	Dallas Stars	2–1	Buffalo Sabres	Marine Midland Arena	Recap
No scoring		First period	No scoring
Joe Nieuwendyk (10) – 15:33		Second period	07:51 – Stu Barnes (6)
Joe Nieuwendyk (11) – 09:35		Third period	No scoring
Ed Belfour 11 saves / 12 shots		Goalie stats	Dominik Hasek 27 shots / 29 saves

June 15	Dallas Stars	1–2	Buffalo Sabres	Marine Midland Arena	Recap
Jere Lehtinen (9) – pp – 10:14		First period	08:09 – Geoff Sanderson (4)
No scoring		Second period	07:37 – Dixon Ward (7)
No scoring		Third period	No scoring
Ed Belfour 16 saves / 18 shots		Goalie stats	Dominik Hasek 30 saves / 31 shots

June 17	Buffalo Sabres	0–2	Dallas Stars	Reunion Arena	Recap
No scoring		First period	No scoring
No scoring		Second period	02:23 – pp – Darryl Sydor (3)
No scoring		Third period	15:21 – Pat Verbeek (3)
Dominik Hasek 19 saves / 21 shots		Goalie stats	Ed Belfour 23 saves / 23 shots

June 19	Dallas Stars	2–1	3OT	Buffalo Sabres	Marine Midland Arena	Recap
Jere Lehtinen (10) – 08:09		First period		No scoring
No scoring		Second period		18:21 – Stu Barnes (7)
No scoring		Third period		No scoring
Brett Hull (8) – 14:51		Third overtime period		No scoring
Ed Belfour 53 saves / 54 shots		Goalie stats		Dominik Hasek 48 saves / 50 shots

Dallas won series 4–2

== Playoff statistics ==
=== Skaters ===
These are the top eleven skaters based on points.

Player	Team	GP	G	A	Pts	+/–	PIM
Peter Forsberg	Colorado Avalanche	19	8	16	24	+7	31
Mike Modano	Dallas Stars	23	5	18	23	+6	16
Joe Nieuwendyk	Dallas Stars	23	11	10	21	+7	19
Joe Sakic	Colorado Avalanche	19	6	13	19	-2	8
Jamie Langenbrunner	Dallas Stars	23	10	7	17	+7	16
Theo Fleury	Colorado Avalanche	18	5	12	17	-2	20
Mats Sundin	Toronto Maple Leafs	17	8	8	16	+2	16
Brett Hull	Dallas Stars	22	8	7	15	+3	4
Martin Straka	Pittsburgh Penguins	13	6	9	15	0	6
Alexei Zhitnik	Buffalo Sabres	21	4	11	15	-6	52
Jason Woolley	Buffalo Sabres	21	4	11	15	0	10

=== Goaltenders ===
This is a combined table of the top five goaltenders based on goals against average and the top five goaltenders based on save percentage, with at least 420 minutes played. The table is sorted by GAA, and the criteria for inclusion are bolded.

Player	Team	GP	W	L	SA	GA	GAA	SV%	SO	TOI
Ed Belfour	Dallas Stars	23	16	7	617	43	**1.67**	**.930**	3	1543:36
Dominik Hasek	Buffalo Sabres	19	13	6	587	36	**1.77**	**.939**	2	1217:08
Byron Dafoe	Boston Bruins	12	6	6	330	26	**2.03**	**.921**	2	767:58
Grant Fuhr	St. Louis Blues	13	6	6	305	31	**2.36**	.898	1	789:32
Nikolai Khabibulin	Phoenix Coyotes	7	3	4	236	18	**2.41**	**.924**	0	448:34

== See also ==
- 1998–99 NHL season
- List of Stanley Cup champions

Preceded by 1998 Stanley Cup playoffs	Stanley Cup playoffs	Succeeded by 2000 Stanley Cup playoffs
