= Bill Houlder =

Canadian ice hockey player (born 1967)

- Born: March 11, 1967 (age 59) Thunder Bay, Ontario, Canada
- Height: 6 ft 2 in (188 cm)
- Weight: 217 lb (98 kg; 15 st 7 lb)
- Position: Defence
- Shot: Left
- Played for: Washington Capitals; Buffalo Sabres; Mighty Ducks of Anaheim; St. Louis Blues; Tampa Bay Lightning; San Jose Sharks; Nashville Predators
- NHL draft: 82nd overall, 1985; Washington Capitals
- Playing career: 1987–2003

William K. Houlder (born March 11, 1967) is a Canadian former professional ice hockey defenceman. In his NHL career, Houlder appeared in 846 games. He tallied 59 goals and added 191 assists.

== Playing career ==
He was drafted by the Washington Capitals in the fourth round, 82nd overall, of the 1985 NHL entry draft. After playing three seasons with the North Bay Centennials of the Ontario Hockey League, Houlder joined the Capitals during the 1987–88 season. After going back and forth between Washington and their AHL affiliate Baltimore Skipjacks for three seasons, Houlder was traded to the Buffalo Sabres before the 1990–91 season in exchange for Shawn Anderson.

Houlder remained with the Sabres until being selected by the Mighty Ducks of Anaheim in the 1993 NHL Expansion Draft. Houlder's journeyman status continued for the remainder of his career, as he played just one season for Anaheim before moving on to play with the St. Louis Blues, Tampa Bay Lightning, San Jose Sharks, the Lightning again, and the Nashville Predators. Houlder retired after the 2002–03 season as a Predator. In his NHL career, Houlder appeared in 846 games. He tallied 59 goals and added 191 assists.

== Career statistics ==
=== Regular season and playoffs ===
			Regular season					Playoffs
Season	Team	League	GP	G	A	Pts	PIM	GP	G	A	Pts	PIM
1984–85	North Bay Centennials	OHL	66	4	20	24	37	8	0	0	0	2
1985–86	North Bay Centennials	OHL	59	5	30	35	97	10	1	6	7	12
1986–87	North Bay Centennials	OHL	62	17	51	68	68	22	4	19	23	20
1987–88	Fort Wayne Komets	IHL	43	10	14	24	32	—	—	—	—	—
1987–88	Washington Capitals	NHL	30	1	2	3	10	—	—	—	—	—
1988–89	Baltimore Skipjacks	AHL	65	10	36	46	50	—	—	—	—	—
1988–89	Washington Capitals	NHL	8	0	3	3	4	—	—	—	—	—
1989–90	Baltimore Skipjacks	AHL	26	3	7	10	12	7	0	2	2	2
1989–90	Washington Capitals	NHL	41	1	11	12	28	—	—	—	—	—
1990–91	Rochester Americans	AHL	69	13	53	66	28	15	5	13	18	4
1990–91	Buffalo Sabres	NHL	7	0	2	2	4	—	—	—	—	—
1991–92	Rochester Americans	AHL	42	8	26	34	16	16	5	6	11	4
1991–92	Buffalo Sabres	NHL	10	1	0	1	8	—	—	—	—	—
1992–93	San Diego Gulls	IHL	64	24	48	72	39	—	—	—	—	—
1992–93	Buffalo Sabres	NHL	15	3	5	8	6	8	0	2	2	4
1993–94	Mighty Ducks of Anaheim	NHL	80	14	25	39	40	—	—	—	—	—
1994–95	St. Louis Blues	NHL	41	5	13	18	20	4	1	1	2	0
1995–96	Tampa Bay Lightning	NHL	61	5	23	28	22	6	0	1	1	4
1996–97	Tampa Bay Lightning	NHL	79	4	21	25	30	—	—	—	—	—
1997–98	San Jose Sharks	NHL	82	7	25	32	48	6	1	2	3	2
1998–99	San Jose Sharks	NHL	76	9	23	32	40	6	3	0	3	4
1999–00	Tampa Bay Lightning	NHL	14	1	2	3	2	—	—	—	—	—
1999–00	Nashville Predators	NHL	57	2	12	14	24	—	—	—	—	—
2000–01	Nashville Predators	NHL	81	4	12	16	40	—	—	—	—	—
2001–02	Nashville Predators	NHL	82	0	8	8	40	—	—	—	—	—
2002–03	Nashville Predators	NHL	82	2	4	6	46	—	—	—	—	—
NHL totals			846	59	191	250	412	30	5	6	11	14

Preceded by Rob Zamuner	Tampa Bay Lightning captain 1999	Succeeded by Chris Gratton
