= Rob Zamuner =

Canadian ice hockey player (born 1969)

- Born: September 17, 1969 (age 56) Oakville, Ontario, Canada
- Height: 6 ft 2 in (188 cm)
- Weight: 205 lb (93 kg; 14 st 9 lb)
- Position: Left wing
- Shot: Left
- Played for: New York Rangers; Tampa Bay Lightning; Ottawa Senators; Boston Bruins; EHC Basel; Bolzano HC
- National team: Canada
- NHL draft: 45th overall, 1989; New York Rangers
- Playing career: 1991–2006

Robert F. Zamuner (born September 17, 1969) is a Canadian former professional ice hockey forward, who played thirteen seasons in the NHL, most notably with the Tampa Bay Lightning.

== Playing career ==
Zamuner played junior hockey for the Guelph Platers of the Ontario Hockey League and was drafted 45th overall by the New York Rangers in the 1987 NHL entry draft. He played only briefly for New York, spending more time on their AHL affiliate in Binghamton.

In 1992 he signed as a free agent with the expansion Tampa Bay Lightning when the Rangers showed little interest in re-signing him. In Tampa he developed a reputation as a competent, hard working, defensive-minded forward, and was named team captain in 1998. The next year he was traded to the Ottawa Senators for Andreas Johansson and the right to sign General Manager Rick Dudley, who was still serving as GM of the Senators. He played in Ottawa for two seasons, playing regularly on the third line in a defensive role. In 2001, he moved on, signing as a free agent with the Boston Bruins.

During the 2004–05 NHL lockout, Zamuner went to play with HC Basel in Switzerland. With his scoring deteriorating, no NHL team was willing to sign him so he stayed in Europe the next season, signing with Bolzano HC in Italy. On June 6, 2006, Zamuner signed to play the remainder of the 2006 season with the Brisbane Blue Tongues of the Australian Ice Hockey League, after which he retired.

Internationally, Zamuner played twice on Canada's world championship teams. Zamuner's defensive play, along with his exceptional face-off taking ability led to a surprise selection on Canada's 1998 Olympic men's hockey team.

== Personal life ==
Zamuner and his wife, Ann have three children and the family resides in Oakville, Ontario.

Zamuner is currently employed with the NHLPA as their Atlantic Divisional Representative.

== Career statistics ==
=== Regular season and playoffs ===
			Regular season					Playoffs
Season	Team	League	GP	G	A	Pts	PIM	GP	G	A	Pts	PIM
1986–87	Guelph Platers	OHL	62	6	15	21	8	5	0	5	5	2
1987–88	Guelph Platers	OHL	58	20	41	61	18	—	—	—	—	—
1988–89	Guelph Platers	OHL	66	46	65	111	38	7	5	5	10	9
1989–90	Flint Spirits	IHL	77	44	35	79	32	4	1	0	1	6
1990–91	Binghamton Rangers	AHL	80	25	58	83	50	9	7	6	13	35
1991–92	Binghamton Rangers	AHL	61	19	53	72	42	11	8	9	17	8
1991–92	New York Rangers	NHL	9	1	2	3	2	—	—	—	—	—
1992–93	Tampa Bay Lightning	NHL	84	15	28	43	74	—	—	—	—	—
1993–94	Tampa Bay Lightning	NHL	59	6	6	12	42	—	—	—	—	—
1994–95	Tampa Bay Lightning	NHL	43	9	6	15	24	—	—	—	—	—
1995–96	Tampa Bay Lightning	NHL	72	15	20	35	62	6	2	3	5	10
1996–97	Tampa Bay Lightning	NHL	82	17	33	50	56	—	—	—	—	—
1997–98	Tampa Bay Lightning	NHL	77	14	12	26	41	—	—	—	—	—
1998–99	Tampa Bay Lightning	NHL	58	8	11	19	24	—	—	—	—	—
1999–00	Ottawa Senators	NHL	57	9	12	21	32	6	2	0	2	2
2000–01	Ottawa Senators	NHL	79	19	18	37	52	4	0	0	0	6
2001–02	Boston Bruins	NHL	66	12	13	25	24	6	0	2	2	4
2002–03	Boston Bruins	NHL	55	10	6	16	18	5	0	0	0	4
2003–04	Boston Bruins	NHL	57	4	5	9	16	7	0	0	0	0
2003–04	Providence Bruins	AHL	4	0	1	1	2	—	—	—	—	—
2004–05	EHC Basel	NLB	40	10	24	34	91	12	7	7	14	24
2005–06	Bolzano HC	ITA	17	8	10	18	6	—	—	—	—	—
2005–06	EHC Basel	NLA	12	1	2	3	26	4	1	1	2	10
2005–06	Brisbane Blue Tongues	AUS	5	5	8	13	0	—	—	—	—	—
NHL totals			798	139	172	311	467	34	4	5	9	26

=== International ===
Year	Team	Event	GP	G	A	Pts	PIM
1997	Canada	WC	11	4	2	6	16
1998	Canada	OG	6	1	0	1	8
1998	Canada	WC	5	0	2	2	4
Senior totals			22	5	4	9	28

== See also ==
- Captain (ice hockey)

Preceded by Mikael Renberg	Tampa Bay Lightning captain 1998–99	Succeeded by Bill Houlder
