= Garry Valk =

Canadian ice hockey player

- Born: November 27, 1967 (age 58) Edmonton, Alberta, Canada
- Height: 6 ft 1 in (185 cm)
- Weight: 205 lb (93 kg; 14 st 9 lb)
- Position: Left wing
- Shot: Left
- Played for: Vancouver Canucks; Mighty Ducks of Anaheim; Pittsburgh Penguins; Toronto Maple Leafs; Chicago Blackhawks
- NHL draft: 108th overall, 1987; Vancouver Canucks
- Playing career: 1990–2003

Garry Valk (born November 27, 1967) is a Canadian broadcaster and former professional ice hockey player. After finishing his playing career, Valk became a television analyst.

== Playing career ==
He was selected 108th overall in the 1987 NHL entry draft. Valk had a ten-year NHL career, debuting with the Vancouver Canucks in the 1990–91 season, scoring ten goals and eleven assists for twenty-one points, while recording sixty-seven penalty minutes. Valk's strongest career year came in 1993–94, when he recorded forty-five points in seventy-eight games for the Mighty Ducks of Anaheim, after being selected in the NHL's expansion draft.

Arguably his best work came in the late 1990s, when he was signed as a free agent by the Toronto Maple Leafs. Valk became a player-coach that Pat Quinn depended on, fighting off opponents in crucial situations while also being an offensive threat.

Career highlights for Valk include the 1998–1999 playoffs, when he scored a key overtime goal to lift the Toronto Maple Leafs over the Pittsburgh Penguins in the second round of the NHL playoffs.

Valk finished his career with a brief stint in 2003 with the Chicago Blackhawks.

== Post-playing career ==
Valk retired to pursue an interest in broadcasting, and to spend time with his family. Today, Garry coaches his son's junior hockey team in North Vancouver, British Columbia, and was featured in a Canadian Business Magazine article on athletes who have gone on to be successful after their careers. He is also a Vancouver Canucks analyst on the sports news show Sportsnet Connected

In 2010, developers of a downtown Toronto condominium project enlisted the public's assistance in picking a name for the structure. Among the names submitted in the Internet poll, "Garry Valk Plaza" proved to be amongst the most popular entries.

== Career statistics ==
=== Regular season and playoffs ===
			Regular season					Playoffs
Season	Team	League	GP	G	A	Pts	PIM	GP	G	A	Pts	PIM
1984–85	Sherwood Park Crusaders	AJHL	53	20	22	42	66	—	—	—	—	—
1985–86	Sherwood Park Crusaders	AJHL	40	20	26	46	116	—	—	—	—	—
1986–87	Sherwood Park Crusaders	AJHL	59	42	44	86	204	—	—	—	—	—
1987–88	University of North Dakota	WCHA	38	23	12	35	64	—	—	—	—	—
1988–89	University of North Dakota	WCHA	40	14	17	31	71	—	—	—	—	—
1989–90	University of North Dakota	WCHA	43	22	17	39	92	—	—	—	—	—
1990–91	Vancouver Canucks	NHL	59	10	11	21	67	5	0	0	0	20
1990–91	Milwaukee Admirals	IHL	10	12	4	16	13	3	0	0	0	2
1991–92	Vancouver Canucks	NHL	65	8	17	25	56	4	0	0	0	5
1992–93	Vancouver Canucks	NHL	48	6	7	13	77	7	0	1	1	12
1992–93	Hamilton Canucks	AHL	7	3	6	9	6	—	—	—	—	—
1993–94	Mighty Ducks of Anaheim	NHL	78	18	27	45	100	—	—	—	—	—
1994–95	Mighty Ducks of Anaheim	NHL	36	3	6	9	34	—	—	—	—	—
1995–96	Mighty Ducks of Anaheim	NHL	79	12	12	24	125	—	—	—	—	—
1996–97	Mighty Ducks of Anaheim	NHL	53	7	7	14	53	—	—	—	—	—
1996–97	Pittsburgh Penguins	NHL	17	3	4	7	25	—	—	—	—	—
1997–98	Pittsburgh Penguins	NHL	39	2	1	3	33	—	—	—	—	—
1998–99	Toronto Maple Leafs	NHL	77	8	21	29	53	17	3	4	7	22
1999–00	Toronto Maple Leafs	NHL	73	10	14	24	44	12	1	2	3	14
2000–01	Toronto Maple Leafs	NHL	74	8	18	26	46	5	1	0	1	2
2001–02	Toronto Maple Leafs	NHL	63	5	10	15	28	11	1	0	1	4
2002–03	Chicago Blackhawks	NHL	16	0	1	1	6	—	—	—	—	—
2002–03	Norfolk Admirals	AHL	22	6	5	11	16	—	—	—	—	—
NHL totals			777	100	156	256	747	61	6	7	13	79
