= Jan Hrdina =

Czech ice hockey player (born 1976)

- Born: February 5, 1976 (age 50) Hradec Králové, Czechoslovakia
- Height: 5 ft 11 in (180 cm)
- Weight: 196 lb (89 kg; 14 st 0 lb)
- Position: Center
- Shot: Right
- Played for: NHL; Pittsburgh Penguins; Phoenix Coyotes; New Jersey Devils; Columbus Blue Jackets; AHL; Syracuse Crunch; IHL; Cleveland Lumberjacks; WHL; Seattle Thunderbirds; Spokane Chiefs; Extraliga; HC Hradec Králové; HC Kladno; SM-I; HIFK; SHL; HV71
- National team: Czech Republic
- NHL draft: 128th overall, 1995; Pittsburgh Penguins
- Playing career: 1993–2010

Jan Hrdina (born February 5, 1976) is a Czech former professional ice hockey player.

== Playing career ==
Hrdina was drafted by the Pittsburgh Penguins in the 1995 NHL entry draft in the 5th round, 128th overall.

In March 2003, the Pittsburgh Penguins traded Hrdina and François Leroux to the Phoenix Coyotes for Ramzi Abid, Dan Focht and Guillaume Lefebvre. One year later, March 2004, the Phoenix Coyotes traded him to the New Jersey Devils for Michael Rupp and a second-round draft pick in the 2004 NHL Entry Draft.

On August 28, 2006, Hrdina signed a six-month contract with the Swedish elite club HV71 in Elitserien. He joined the club on October 18, 2006, due to some Swedish tax laws concerning the specific type of contract signed. Before that he started the season 2006–07 playing for HIFK in the Finnish SM-liiga. After the season, he extended the contract for another two years

Hrdina played three games with Swedish Elitserien club HV71 during the 2008–09 season. Because of an ongoing hip problem, Hrdina returned to the United States to have surgery.

In an interview from July 2011, Hrdina commented that he was retired from professional hockey due to two hip surgeries on the same hip, which put loads of pressure on his leg when skating. Aside from the hip surgery, Hrdina has also admitted that he had problems with his groin and back over the previous five or six years.

== Personal ==
Since his retirement, Hrdina has returned to his hometown of Hradec Kralove where he is a member of the Czech Extraliga board.

Hrdina has two children; a daughter (born 2008) and a son (born 2010).

== Awards ==
- Swedish Champion with HV71 in 2008.

== Career statistics ==
=== Regular season and playoffs ===
| | | | Regular season | | | | | Playoffs |
| Season | Team | League | GP | G | A | Pts | PIM | GP | G | A | Pts | PIM |
|---|---|---|---|---|---|---|---|---|---|---|---|---|
| 1993–94 | HC Stadion Hradec Králové | CZE U20 | 10 | 1 | 6 | 7 | 0 | — | — | — | — | — |
| 1993–94 | HC Stadion Hradec Králové | ELH | 23 | 1 | 5 | 6 | 0 | — | — | — | — | — |
| 1994–95 | Seattle Thunderbirds | WHL | 69 | 41 | 59 | 100 | 79 | 4 | 0 | 1 | 1 | 8 |
| 1995–96 | Seattle Thunderbirds | WHL | 30 | 19 | 28 | 47 | 37 | — | — | — | — | — |
| 1995–96 | Spokane Chiefs | WHL | 18 | 10 | 16 | 26 | 25 | 18 | 5 | 14 | 19 | 49 |
| 1996–97 | Cleveland Lumberjacks | IHL | 68 | 23 | 31 | 54 | 82 | 13 | 1 | 2 | 3 | 8 |
| 1997–98 | Syracuse Crunch | AHL | 72 | 20 | 24 | 44 | 82 | 5 | 1 | 3 | 4 | 10 |
| 1998–99 | Pittsburgh Penguins | NHL | 82 | 13 | 29 | 42 | 40 | 13 | 4 | 1 | 5 | 12 |
| 1999–2000 | Pittsburgh Penguins | NHL | 70 | 13 | 33 | 46 | 43 | 9 | 4 | 8 | 12 | 2 |
| 2000–01 | Pittsburgh Penguins | NHL | 78 | 15 | 28 | 43 | 48 | 18 | 2 | 5 | 7 | 8 |
| 2001–02 | Pittsburgh Penguins | NHL | 79 | 24 | 33 | 57 | 50 | — | — | — | — | — |
| 2002–03 | Pittsburgh Penguins | NHL | 57 | 14 | 25 | 39 | 34 | — | — | — | — | — |
| 2002–03 | Phoenix Coyotes | NHL | 4 | 0 | 4 | 4 | 8 | — | — | — | — | — |
| 2003–04 | Phoenix Coyotes | NHL | 55 | 11 | 15 | 26 | 30 | — | — | — | — | — |
| 2003–04 | New Jersey Devils | NHL | 13 | 1 | 6 | 7 | 10 | 5 | 2 | 0 | 2 | 2 |
| 2004–05 | HC Rabat Kladno | ELH | 23 | 4 | 3 | 7 | 38 | 7 | 3 | 3 | 6 | 4 |
| 2005–06 | Columbus Blue Jackets | NHL | 75 | 10 | 23 | 33 | 78 | — | — | — | — | — |
| 2006–07 | HIFK | SM-l | 10 | 2 | 6 | 8 | 22 | — | — | — | — | — |
| 2006–07 | HV71 | SEL | 41 | 7 | 19 | 26 | 66 | 14 | 2 | 8 | 10 | 82 |
| 2007–08 | TPS | SM-l | 4 | 0 | 1 | 1 | 2 | — | — | — | — | — |
| 2007–08 | HV71 | SEL | 51 | 18 | 24 | 42 | 60 | 17 | 6 | 1 | 7 | 53 |
| 2008–09 | HV71 | SEL | 3 | 0 | 0 | 0 | 0 | — | — | — | — | — |
| NHL totals | | | 513 | 101 | 196 | 297 | 341 | 45 | 12 | 14 | 26 | 24 |
| SHL totals | | | 95 | 25 | 43 | 68 | 126 | 31 | 8 | 9 | 17 | 135 |

Statistics as of February 2, 2010.

=== International ===
| Year | Team | Event | GP | G | A | Pts | PIM |
|---|---|---|---|---|---|---|---|
| 1994 | Czech Republic | EJC | 5 | 1 | 1 | 2 | 0 |
| 1995 | Czech Republic | WJC | 7 | 2 | 1 | 3 | 4 |
| 2002 | Czech Republic | OG | 4 | 0 | 0 | 0 | 0 |
| 2002 | Czech Republic | WC | 7 | 2 | 1 | 3 | 12 |
| Junior totals | | | 12 | 3 | 2 | 5 | 4 |
| Senior totals | | | 11 | 2 | 1 | 3 | 12 |

Statistics as of January 14, 2019.

== Salary Information ==
| Year | Team | League | Salary |
|---|---|---|---|
| 1998–99 | Pittsburgh Penguins | NHL | $360,000 |
| 1999–2000 | Pittsburgh Penguins | NHL | $500,000 |
| 2000–01 | Pittsburgh Penguins | NHL | $700,000 |
| 2001–02 | Pittsburgh Penguins | NHL | $1,000,000 |
| 2002–03 | Pittsburgh Penguins/Phoenix Coyotes | NHL | $1,250,000 |
| 2003–04 | Phoenix Coyotes/NJ Devils | NHL | $2,200,000 |
| 2004–05 | NHL Lockout | NHL | $0 |
| 2005–06 | Columbus Blue Jackets | NHL | $1,000,000 |
| Totals | 7 Seasons | NHL | $7,010,000 |
