= Sylvain Côté =

Canadian ice hockey player (born 1966)

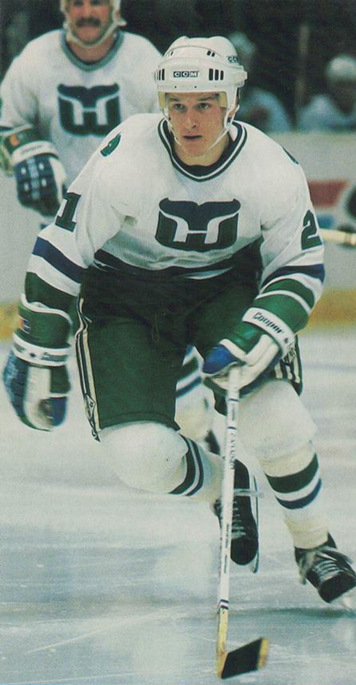
- Born: January 19, 1966 (age 60) Quebec City, Quebec, Canada
- Height: 6 ft 0 in (183 cm)
- Weight: 190 lb (86 kg; 13 st 8 lb)
- Position: Defense
- Shot: Right
- Played for: Hartford Whalers; Washington Capitals; Toronto Maple Leafs; Chicago Blackhawks; Dallas Stars
- National team: Canada
- NHL draft: 11th overall, 1984; Hartford Whalers
- Playing career: 1982–2003

Sylvain Côté (born January 19, 1966) is a Canadian former professional ice hockey player who spent 19 seasons in the NHL, the majority of them with the Washington Capitals. He also played for the Hartford Whalers, Toronto Maple Leafs, Chicago Blackhawks and Dallas Stars.

== Biography ==
Côté was born in Quebec City, Quebec, but grew up in Duberger, Quebec. As a youth, he played in the 1978 and 1979 Quebec International Pee-Wee Hockey Tournaments with a minor ice hockey team from Quebec City, and played with his brother in the 1979 event.

Côté was all-Star selection as a defenceman in the 1986 IIHF World Junior Hockey Championships He was originally selected by Hartford Whalers in the first round (#11 overall) of the 1984 NHL entry draft. He was a member of the 2000 Dallas team that went to the Stanley Cup Finals.

== Career statistics ==
=== Regular season and playoffs ===
			Regular season					Playoffs
Season	Team	League	GP	G	A	Pts	PIM	GP	G	A	Pts	PIM
1981–82	Ste-Foy Gouverneurs	QMAAA	46	18	29	47	117	5	0	3	3	8
1982–83	Québec Remparts	QMJHL	66	10	24	34	50	—	—	—	—	—
1983–84	Québec Remparts	QMJHL	66	15	50	65	89	5	1	1	2	0
1984–85	Québec Remparts	QMJHL	2	0	1	1	2	—	—	—	—	—
1984–85	Hartford Whalers	NHL	67	3	9	12	17	—	—	—	—	—
1985–86	Hartford Whalers	NHL	2	0	0	0	0	—	—	—	—	—
1985–86	Binghamton Whalers	AHL	12	2	4	6	0	—	—	—	—	—
1985–86	Hull Olympiques	QMJHL	26	10	33	43	14	13	6	28	34	22
1985–86	Hull Olympiques	MC	—	—	—	—	—	5	0	3	3	14
1986–87	Hartford Whalers	NHL	67	2	8	10	20	2	0	2	2	2
1987–88	Hartford Whalers	NHL	67	7	21	28	30	6	1	1	2	4
1988–89	Hartford Whalers	NHL	78	8	9	17	49	3	0	1	1	4
1989–90	Hartford Whalers	NHL	28	4	2	6	14	5	0	0	0	2
1990–91	Hartford Whalers	NHL	73	7	12	19	17	6	0	2	2	2
1991–92	Washington Capitals	NHL	78	11	29	40	31	7	1	2	3	4
1992–93	Washington Capitals	NHL	77	21	29	50	34	6	1	1	2	4
1993–94	Washington Capitals	NHL	84	16	35	51	66	9	1	8	9	6
1994–95	Washington Capitals	NHL	47	5	14	19	53	7	1	3	4	2
1995–96	Washington Capitals	NHL	81	5	33	38	40	6	2	0	2	12
1996–97	Washington Capitals	NHL	57	6	18	24	28	—	—	—	—	—
1997–98	Washington Capitals	NHL	59	1	15	16	36	—	—	—	—	—
1997–98	Toronto Maple Leafs	NHL	12	3	6	9	6	—	—	—	—	—
1998–99	Toronto Maple Leafs	NHL	79	5	24	29	28	17	2	1	3	10
1999–2000	Toronto Maple Leafs	NHL	3	0	1	1	0	—	—	—	—	—
1999–2000	Chicago Blackhawks	NHL	45	6	18	24	14	—	—	—	—	—
1999–2000	Dallas Stars	NHL	28	2	8	10	14	23	2	1	3	8
2000–01	Washington Capitals	NHL	68	7	11	18	18	5	0	0	0	2
2001–02	Washington Capitals	NHL	70	3	11	14	26	—	—	—	—	—
2002–03	Washington Capitals	NHL	1	0	0	0	4	—	—	—	—	—
NHL totals			1,171	122	313	435	545	102	11	22	33	62

=== International ===
Year	Team	Event	GP	G	A	Pts	PIM
1984	Canada	WJC	7	0	2	2	13
1986	Canada	WJC	7	1	4	5	4
1996	Canada	WCH	2	0	1	1	0
Junior totals			14	1	6	7	17
Senior totals			2	0	1	1	0

== See also ==
- List of NHL players with 1,000 games played

Preceded by Sylvain Turgeon	Hartford Whalers first-round draft pick 1984	Succeeded by Dana Murzyn
