= Curtis Brown (ice hockey) =

Canadian ice hockey player (born 1976)

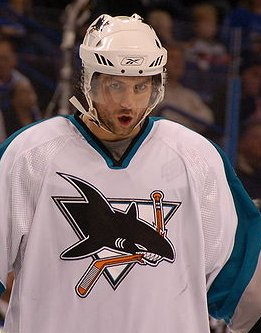
- Born: February 12, 1976 (age 50) Unity, Saskatchewan, Canada
- Height: 6 ft 0 in (183 cm)
- Weight: 200 lb (91 kg; 14 st 4 lb)
- Position: Forward
- Shot: Left
- Played for: Buffalo Sabres; San Jose Sharks; Chicago Blackhawks; Kloten Flyers; EHC Biel
- National team: Canada
- NHL draft: 43rd overall, 1994; Buffalo Sabres
- Playing career: 1994–2011

Curtis Dean Brown (born February 12, 1976) is a Canadian former professional ice hockey player. He was drafted by the Buffalo Sabres in the second round (43rd overall) of the 1994 NHL entry draft. Over his National Hockey League (NHL) career, he played for the Sabres, San Jose Sharks, and Chicago Blackhawks.

Brown served as a Sharks pregame and postgame analyst on NBC Sports California until 2023 when he moved to Nebraska to accept a position with the Lincoln Stars. As of 2024, Brown is the head coach and general manager of the Lincoln Stars AAA team.

== Playing career ==
Brown was drafted in the second round of the 1994 NHL entry draft by the Buffalo Sabres. After finishing the 1994–95 WHL season with the Moose Jaw Warriors, he debuted with the Sabres on May 3, 1995, against the New Jersey Devils and scored a goal and an assist.

Brown returned to the WHL for 1995–96 and was traded from Moose Jaw to the Prince Albert Raiders before finishing out the season with Buffalo.

By 1997–98, Brown became a full-time player for the Sabres, usually on the third line.

In March 2004, Brown was traded to the San Jose Sharks in a three-way trade that saw Buffalo acquire Jeff Jillson from Boston while they received Brad Boyes and Andy Delmore. Brown played only 12 games for San Jose, however, and spent the 2004 NHL lockout season in the ECHL with the San Diego Gulls.

On July 2, 2004, Brown signed a four-year deal with the Chicago Blackhawks, only to be bought out after only one NHL season. Brown was the first player ever to have his contract bought out.

Brown signed with San Jose as an unrestricted free agent in July 2006. The two-year deal was worth just $1.4 million, with Brown stating that he signed for such a relatively low salary because he had already received money from Chicago's buy-out.

On July 17, 2008, Brown completed his NHL career and signed with the Kloten Flyers of the Swiss Nationalliga A where he played for one season. He then switched to defense and played the final two seasons of his career with EHC Biel before retiring.

== Personal life ==
Brown, of Christian faith, has a wife, Ami. The couple had a daughter, Aubri, who died in late 2005 of sudden infant death syndrome. The death of their daughter inspired them to create The Aubri Brown Foundation, a foundation that helps parents going through the loss of their children. They have three sons, Gage, Garrett, and Griffin.

== Career statistics ==
=== Regular season and playoffs ===
			Regular season					Playoffs
Season	Team	League	GP	G	A	Pts	PIM	GP	G	A	Pts	PIM
1991–92	Moose Jaw Warriors	WHL	—	—	—	—	—	1	0	0	0	0
1992–93	Moose Jaw Warriors	WHL	71	13	16	29	30	—	—	—	—	—
1993–94	Moose Jaw Warriors	WHL	72	27	38	65	82	—	—	—	—	—
1994–95	Moose Jaw Warriors	WHL	70	51	53	104	63	10	8	7	15	20
1994–95	Buffalo Sabres	NHL	1	1	1	2	2	—	—	—	—	—
1995–96	Moose Jaw Warriors	WHL	25	20	18	38	30	—	—	—	—	—
1995–96	Prince Albert Raiders	WHL	19	12	21	33	8	18	10	15	25	18
1995–96	Buffalo Sabres	NHL	4	0	0	0	0	—	—	—	—	—
1995–96	Rochester Americans	AHL	—	—	—	—	—	12	0	1	1	2
1996–97	Rochester Americans	AHL	51	22	21	43	30	10	4	6	10	4
1996–97	Buffalo Sabres	NHL	28	4	3	7	18	—	—	—	—	—
1997–98	Buffalo Sabres	NHL	63	12	12	24	34	13	1	2	3	10
1998–99	Buffalo Sabres	NHL	78	16	31	47	56	21	7	6	13	10
1999–00	Buffalo Sabres	NHL	74	22	29	51	42	5	1	3	4	6
2000–01	Buffalo Sabres	NHL	70	10	22	32	34	13	5	0	5	8
2001–02	Buffalo Sabres	NHL	82	20	17	37	32	—	—	—	—	—
2002–03	Buffalo Sabres	NHL	74	15	16	31	40	—	—	—	—	—
2003–04	Buffalo Sabres	NHL	68	9	12	21	30	—	—	—	—	—
2003–04	San Jose Sharks	NHL	12	2	2	4	6	17	0	2	2	18
2004–05	San Diego Gulls	ECHL	47	9	29	38	24	—	—	—	—	—
2005–06	Chicago Blackhawks	NHL	71	5	10	15	38	—	—	—	—	—
2006–07	San Jose Sharks	NHL	78	8	12	20	56	11	0	2	2	2
2007–08	San Jose Sharks	NHL	33	5	4	9	10	7	0	0	0	4
2008–09	Kloten Flyers	NLA	44	10	13	23	26	15	4	5	9	20
2009–10	EHC Biel	NLA	49	9	17	26	24	—	—	—	—	—
2010–11	EHC Biel	NLA	29	3	5	8	20	—	—	—	—	—
NHL totals			736	129	171	300	398	87	14	15	29	58
AHL totals			51	22	21	43	30	22	4	7	11	6
NLA totals			122	22	35	57	70	—	—	—	—	—

=== International ===
Medal record

Representing Canada

Men's ice hockey

World Junior Championships
Gold medal – first place	1996 United States	

Year	Team	Event	GP	G	A	Pts	PIM
1996	Canada	WJC	5	0	1	1	2
2000	Canada	WC	9	1	3	4	8
Junior totals			5	0	1	1	2
Senior totals			9	1	3	4	8

== Awards ==
- WHL East First All-Star Team – 1995
- WHL East Second All-Star Team – 1996
