= Sergei Berezin =

Russian ice hockey player (1971–2024)

- Born: November 5, 1971 Voskresensk, Russian SFSR, Soviet Union
- Died: June 26, 2024 (aged 52) Windermere, Florida, U.S.
- Height: 5 ft 10 in (178 cm)
- Weight: 194 lb (88 kg; 13 st 12 lb)
- Position: Left wing
- Shot: Right
- Played for: Khimik Voskresensk; Kölner Haie; Toronto Maple Leafs; Phoenix Coyotes; Montreal Canadiens; Chicago Blackhawks; Washington Capitals; HC CSKA Moscow
- National team: Russia
- NHL draft: 256th overall, 1994; Toronto Maple Leafs
- Playing career: 1990–2004
Medal record
Men's ice hockey
Representing Soviet Union
World Junior Championships
Silver medal – second place	1991 Canada	Team

Sergei Yevgenyevich Berezin (Russian: Серге́й Евгеньевич Березин; November 5, 1971 – June 26, 2024) was a Russian professional ice hockey player who played in the National Hockey League (NHL) from 1996–97 through 2002–03. Berezin, who played left wing in the NHL, was selected by the Toronto Maple Leafs in the tenth round (#256 overall) of the 1994 NHL entry draft. He played with the Leafs until being traded to the Phoenix Coyotes in 2001. At the end of the season he was flipped to the Montreal Canadiens where he scored their 10,000th goal on home ice. In the offseason he was traded to the Chicago Blackhawks before being sent to the Washington Capitals in a trade deadline day deal. He retired from the NHL and returned to Russia to play a final season before ending his career completely.

== Playing career ==
From 1990–1994 Berezin played in Russia for Khimik Voskresensk where, in 1993–1994, he picked up 41 points in 40 games. He was selected in the 1994 NHL entry draft in the 10th round, 256th overall by the Toronto Maple Leafs. After being selected, Berezin played in the Deutsche Eishockey Liga (DEL) for the Kölner Haie (Cologne Sharks) where he registered 137 total points in 88 games played.

In his first season in the NHL (1996–97) Berezin scored 25 goals and had 41 points in 73 games. This production was enough to earn a spot on the NHL All-Rookie Team. His best NHL season was in 1998–99 when he scored 37 goals and 59 points. After the 2000–01 season Berezin was traded from Toronto to the Phoenix Coyotes for Mikael Renberg. He was considered speedy and great in the offensive zone but not great defensively. He was known for losing his helmet during play, once losing his helmet on every single shift in a November 1996 game.

Over the next two seasons, Berezin would play for four different NHL franchises. In the 2001–02 season Berezin was traded by the Coyotes to the Montreal Canadiens for Brian Savage and a third round draft pick. While playing in a home game for the Canadiens, Berezin scored the franchise's 10,000th home goal. He ended the season with 11 goals and 26 points in 70 games. In the off-season Montreal traded him to the Chicago Blackhawks for a fourth round draft choice. At the trade deadline during the 2002–03 season he was shipped by the Blackhawks to the Washington Capitals for a fourth round draft choice, finishing the year with the Capitals. He retired from the NHL in 2003 and returned to Russia to play a single season with CSKA Moscow. He finished his career in the NHL with 502 games played while registering 286 points.

== Personal life and death ==
Berezin resided in Florida following his retirement from hockey. He died in Windermere on June 26, 2024, at the age of 52. No cause of death was given but it was reportedly sudden.

== Career statistics ==
=== Regular season and playoffs ===
			Regular season					Playoffs
Season	Team	League	GP	G	A	Pts	PIM	GP	G	A	Pts	PIM
1989–90	SKA MVO Kalinin	USSR II	8	0	0	0	0	—	—	—	—	—
1990–91	Khimik Voskresensk	USSR	30	6	2	8	4	—	—	—	—	—
1991–92	Khimik Voskresensk	CIS	36	7	5	12	12	7	0	0	0	2
1992–93	Khimik Voskresensk	IHL	38	9	3	12	12	2	1	0	1	0
1993–94	Khimik Voskresensk	IHL	40	31	10	41	16	3	2	0	2	2
1994–95	Kölner Haie	DEL	43	38	19	57	10	18	17	8	25	8
1995–96	Kölner Haie	DEL	45	49	31	80	8	14	13	9	22	10
1996–97	Toronto Maple Leafs	NHL	73	25	16	41	2	—	—	—	—	—
1997–98	Toronto Maple Leafs	NHL	68	16	15	31	10	—	—	—	—	—
1998–99	Toronto Maple Leafs	NHL	76	37	22	59	12	17	6	6	12	4
1999–2000	Toronto Maple Leafs	NHL	61	26	13	39	2	12	4	4	8	0
2000–01	Toronto Maple Leafs	NHL	79	22	28	50	8	11	2	5	7	2
2001–02	Phoenix Coyotes	NHL	41	7	9	16	4	—	—	—	—	—
2001–02	Montreal Canadiens	NHL	29	4	6	10	4	6	1	1	2	0
2002–03	Chicago Blackhawks	NHL	66	18	13	31	8	—	—	—	—	—
2002–03	Washington Capitals	NHL	9	5	4	9	4	6	0	1	1	0
2003–04	CSKA Moscow	RSL	16	1	3	4	14	—	—	—	—	—
IHL totals			78	40	13	53	28	5	3	0	3	2
DEL totals			88	87	50	137	18	32	30	17	47	18
NHL totals			502	160	126	286	54	52	13	17	30	6

=== International ===
Year	Team	Event	Result	GP	G	A	Pts	PIM
1991	Soviet Union	WJC	2nd place, silver medalist(s)	7	3	1	4	6
1994	Russia	OG	4th	8	3	2	5	2
1994	Russia	WC	5th	6	2	1	3	2
1995	Russia	WC	5th	6	7	1	8	4
1996	Russia	WC	4th	8	4	5	9	2
1996	Russia	WCH	SF	2	1	0	1	0
1998	Russia	WC	5th	6	6	2	8	2
Senior totals				36	23	11	34	12
