= Jim Nill =

Canadian ice hockey player

- Born: April 11, 1958 (age 68) Hanna, Alberta, Canada
- Height: 6 ft 0 in (183 cm)
- Weight: 185 lb (84 kg; 13 st 3 lb)
- Position: Right wing
- Shot: Right
- Played for: St. Louis Blues; Vancouver Canucks; Boston Bruins; Winnipeg Jets; Detroit Red Wings
- National team: Canada
- NHL draft: 89th overall, 1978; St. Louis Blues
- Playing career: 1980–1991

James Edward Nill (born April 11, 1958) is a Canadian former ice hockey player and the current general manager of the Dallas Stars of the National Hockey League (NHL). Nill played in the NHL throughout the 1980s with the St. Louis Blues, Vancouver Canucks, Boston Bruins, Winnipeg Jets, and Detroit Red Wings, retiring in 1990. Prior to making his NHL debut Nill also played for Canada at the 1980 Winter Olympics. He worked as a scout for the Ottawa Senators before joining the Red Wings in an executive role in 1994, staying with the team before moving to take up the general manager role with Dallas in 2013.

== Playing career ==
=== Junior ===
Born in Hanna, Alberta, Nill played one season for the Drumheller Falcons of the Alberta Junior Hockey League (AJHL) in 1975, after which he played three seasons with the Medicine Hat Tigers of the WCHL. He was drafted by the St. Louis Blues in the third round, 89th overall, in the 1978 NHL Amateur Draft.

=== International ===
The next season, Nill played with the University of Calgary before signing with the Canadian national team for 1979–80. Nill scored 32 points in 45 exhibition games before playing six games, scoring one goal and two assists, for Canada at the 1980 Lake Placid Olympics.

=== Professional ===
Nill played one season for the Salt-Lake Golden Eagles of the Central Hockey League (CHL) in 1980–81. He finally made his NHL debut in 1982 for the St. Louis Blues. He only played one season for the Blues before being traded to the Vancouver Canucks with Tony Currie, Rick Heinz and St. Louis' fourth-round draft pick (Shawn Kilroy) in the 1982 NHL entry draft in exchange for Glen Hanlon on March 9, 1982. He helped the Canucks to the 1982 Stanley Cup Final where they would lose to the New York Islanders 4–0.

After two more seasons in Vancouver, Nill was traded to the Boston Bruins in exchange for Peter McNab on February 3, 1984. He did not receive very much ice time in Boston and consequently the Bruins ended up trading him to the Winnipeg Jets for Morris Lukowich on February 4, 1985. He played nearly four years for Winnipeg. He was sent to the American Hockey League (AHL)'s Moncton Hawks. He did not stay in New Brunswick long as Detroit Red Wings head coach Jacques Demers liked his tough style of play and acquired him on January 11, 1988 in exchange for fellow journeyman NHLer Mark Kumpel.

Nill played the final three years of his NHL career in Detroit with brief stints for the AHL's Adirondack Red Wings. In Adirondack, he was a teammate of Sheldon Kennedy. He retired from professional hockey after 1991.

== Management career ==
=== Ottawa and Detroit ===
After Nill retired as an active player, he joined the data analytics of the Ottawa Senators as amateur scout. He was promoted to professional scout after only two years. He joined the Detroit Red Wings' front office in the summer of 1994 following his three-year stint with Ottawa.

Nill's duties with Detroit included directing their amateur scouting and selections at the annual NHL Entry Draft. He had also served as the general manager of the Adirondack Red Wings.

Nill continued to oversee the development of the Red Wings' prospects that are currently assigned to Detroit's main affiliate, the Grand Rapids Griffins of the AHL, as well as those in the Canadian junior and European leagues.

In his management role with the Detroit Red Wings, he helped the team to four Stanley Cup Championships in 1997, 1998, 2002 and 2008.

=== Dallas Stars ===
In April 2013, Nill was hired as general manager of the Dallas Stars. He immediately made several major transactions, starting with trading a sixth-round pick in the 2013 NHL entry draft to the Ottawa Senators in exchange for defenceman Sergei Gonchar, then signed Gonchar to a two-year, $10 million contract. On July 4, 2013, in a blockbuster trade, Nill sent 2011 NHL All-Star Loui Eriksson (as well as prospects Joe Morrow, Reilly Smith and Matt Fraser) to the Boston Bruins in exchange for former second overall pick Tyler Seguin as well as Rich Peverley and Ryan Button. On the same day, he traded prospect Philip Larsen and a seventh-round pick in the 2016 NHL entry draft to the Edmonton Oilers in exchange for their captain Shawn Horcoff.

On July 1, 2014, Nill traded for Ottawa centre and captain Jason Spezza and right winger Ludwig Karlsson in exchange for Alex Chiasson, Nick Paul, Alex Guptill and a second-round pick in the 2015 NHL entry draft. On the same day, he also signed unrestricted free agent forward Aleš Hemský to a three-year, $12 million contract.

On July 10, 2015, Nill traded for forward Patrick Sharp and defensive prospect Stephen Johns from the Chicago Blackhawks in exchange for defenceman Trevor Daley and forward Ryan Garbutt. On July 15, 2015, Nill signed unrestricted free agent defenceman Johnny Oduya to a two-year, $7.5 million contract.

On June 28, 2023, Nill was awarded the 2022-23 Jim Gregory General Manager of the Year Award after the Dallas Stars posted a record of 47-21-14 for 108 points in the 2022-23 regular season, at the time their highest point total since 2015-16.

On June 10, 2024, Nill was awarded the 2023-24 Jim Gregory General Manager of the Year Award, winning the award for the second year in a row, after the Stars posted a record of 52-21-9 for 113 points in the 2023-24 regular season, their most single-season wins since their 2005-06 season and their highest point total since their Stanley Cup-winning 1998-99 season.

On June 27, 2025, Nill was awarded the 2024-2025 Jim Gregory General Manager of the Year Award for the third consecutive time, after the Stars posted a record of 50-26-6 for 106 points in the 2024-25 regular season. Nill made one of the most notable moves of the season at the trade deadline on March 7, 2025, by acquiring Mikko Rantanen from the Carolina Hurricanes in exchange for Logan Stankoven, two first-round picks, and two third round picks. He then signed Rantanen to an eight-year, $96 million contract extension.

== Personal life ==
Nill is a devout Christian, having begun exploring the faith initially in his 20s before accepting the religion in his 40s. As of 2026, Nill serves as a board member for the charity Hockey Ministries International, a Christian hockey charity, having been on the board since at least 2013.

== Career statistics ==
=== Regular season and playoffs ===
			Regular season					Playoffs
Season	Team	League	GP	G	A	Pts	PIM	GP	G	A	Pts	PIM
1974–75	Drumheller Falcons	AJHL	58	30	30	60	103	12	5	6	11	35
1975–76	Medicine Hat Tigers	WCHL	62	5	11	16	69	9	1	1	2	20
1976–77	Medicine Hat Tigers	WCHL	71	23	24	47	140	4	2	2	4	4
1977–78	Medicine Hat Tigers	WCHL	72	47	46	93	252	12	8	7	15	37
1978–79	University of Calgary	CIAU	17	8	7	15	36	3	1	2	3	4
1979–80	Canadian National Team	Intl	45	13	19	32	54	—	—	—	—	—
1980–81	Salt Lake Golden Eagles	CHL	79	28	34	62	222	16	9	8	7	38
1981–82	St. Louis Blues	NHL	61	9	12	21	127	—	—	—	—	—
1981–82	Vancouver Canucks	NHL	8	1	2	3	5	16	4	3	7	67
1982–83	Vancouver Canucks	NHL	65	7	15	22	136	4	0	0	0	6
1983–84	Vancouver Canucks	NHL	51	9	6	15	78	—	—	—	—	—
1983–84	Boston Bruins	NHL	27	3	2	5	81	3	0	0	0	4
1984–85	Boston Bruins	NHL	49	1	9	10	62	—	—	—	—	—
1984–85	Winnipeg Jets	NHL	20	8	8	16	38	8	0	1	1	28
1985–86	Winnipeg Jets	NHL	61	6	8	14	75	3	0	0	0	4
1986–87	Winnipeg Jets	NHL	36	3	4	7	52	3	0	0	0	7
1987–88	Winnipeg Jets	NHL	24	0	1	1	44	—	—	—	—	—
1987–88	Moncton Hawks	AHL	3	0	0	0	6	—	—	—	—	—
1987–88	Detroit Red Wings	NHL	36	3	11	14	55	16	6	1	7	62
1988–89	Detroit Red Wings	NHL	71	8	7	15	83	6	0	0	0	25
1989–90	Detroit Red Wings	NHL	15	0	2	2	18	—	—	—	—	—
1989–90	Adirondack Red Wings	AHL	20	10	8	18	24	—	—	—	—	—
1990–91	Adirondack Red Wings	AHL	32	3	10	13	74	2	0	0	0	2
NHL totals			524	58	87	145	854	59	10	5	15	203

=== International ===
Year	Team	Event	GP	G	A	Pts	PIM
1980	Canada	Oly	6	1	2	3	4
Senior totals			6	1	2	3	4

== Awards and honors ==
Award	Year
NHL
Stanley Cup (Director of Player Development/Director of Scouting)	1997, 1998
Stanley Cup (Asst. General Manager)	2002, 2008
Jim Gregory General Manager of the Year Award	2023, 2024, 2025
International
4 Nations Face-Off champion	2025 (associate general manager)

Preceded by Joe Nieuwendyk	General Manager of the Dallas Stars; 2013–present	Incumbent
