= 2014–15 Boston Bruins season =

NHL team season

2014–15 Boston Bruins
- Division: 5th Atlantic
- Conference: 9th Eastern
- 2014–15 record: 41–27–14
- Home record: 24–10–7
- Road record: 17–17–7
- Goals for: 213
- Goals against: 211

Team information
- General manager: Peter Chiarelli
- Coach: Claude Julien
- Captain: Zdeno Chara
- Alternate captains: Patrice Bergeron; Chris Kelly; David Krejci
- Arena: TD Garden
- Average attendance: 17,565(100%) (41 games)
- Minor league affiliates: Providence Bruins (AHL); South Carolina Stingrays (ECHL)

Team leaders
- Goals: Brad Marchand (24)
- Assists: Dougie Hamilton and Patrice Bergeron (32)
- Points: Patrice Bergeron (55)
- Penalty minutes: Brad Marchand (95)
- Plus/minus: Kevan Miller (+20)
- Wins: Tuukka Rask (34)
- Goals against average: Tuukka Rask (2.30)

The 2014–15 Boston Bruins season was their 91st season for the National Hockey League (NHL) franchise that was established on November 1, 1924. Despite earning 96 points, the Bruins did not qualify for the 2015 Stanley Cup playoffs for the first time since 2006–07 season, ending their seven-season playoff streak. At the time, this was the most points ever by a team who did not qualify, surpassing the 95 points earned by the 2006–07 Colorado Avalanche and the 2010–11 Dallas Stars. The Bruins held this record alone for three seasons, until the 2017–18 Florida Panthers tied their record. The 2018–19 Montreal Canadiens and the 2024–25 Calgary Flames would also go on to recorded 96-point playoff misses.

== Off-season ==
On May 21, 2014, the Vancouver Canucks announced that Bruins assistant general manager Jim Benning had been hired as the Canucks' new general manager. Bruins' general manager Peter Chiarelli announced that he would be looking "internally and externally to replace that position".
On June 27, Peter Chiarelli announced that club had promoted Scott Bradley to assistant general manager after he spent five seasons as the team's director of player personnel. Chiarelli also announced that Ryan Nadeau was promoted to director of hockey operations/analytics. The club also hired John Ferguson, Jr. as executive director of player personnel. Ferguson had previously been a part of the San Jose Sharks organization since 2008.

== Standings ==
Atlantic Division
Pos	Team	GP	W	L	OTL	ROW	GF	GA	GD	Pts
1	y – Montreal Canadiens	82	50	22	10	43	221	189	+32	110
2	x – Tampa Bay Lightning	82	50	24	8	47	262	211	+51	108
3	x – Detroit Red Wings	82	43	25	14	39	235	221	+14	100
4	x – Ottawa Senators	82	43	26	13	37	238	215	+23	99
5	Boston Bruins	82	41	27	14	37	213	211	+2	96
6	Florida Panthers	82	38	29	15	30	206	223	−17	91
7	Toronto Maple Leafs	82	30	44	8	25	211	262	−51	68
8	Buffalo Sabres	82	23	51	8	15	161	274	−113	54

Source: National Hockey League
x – Clinched playoff spot; y – Clinched division

Eastern Conference Wild Card
Pos	Div	Team	GP	W	L	OTL	ROW	GF	GA	GD	Pts
1	AT	x – Ottawa Senators	82	43	26	13	37	238	215	+23	99
2	ME	x – Pittsburgh Penguins	82	43	27	12	39	221	210	+11	98
3	AT	Boston Bruins	82	41	27	14	37	213	211	+2	96
4	AT	Florida Panthers	82	38	29	15	30	206	223	−17	91
5	ME	Columbus Blue Jackets	82	42	35	5	33	236	250	−14	89
6	ME	Philadelphia Flyers	82	33	31	18	30	215	234	−19	84
7	ME	New Jersey Devils	82	32	36	14	27	181	216	−35	78
8	ME	Carolina Hurricanes	82	30	41	11	25	188	226	−38	71
9	AT	Toronto Maple Leafs	82	30	44	8	25	211	262	−51	68
10	AT	Buffalo Sabres	82	23	51	8	15	161	274	−113	54

Source: National Hockey League
x – Clinched playoff spot

== Suspensions/fines ==
Player	Explanation	Length	Salary	Date issued
Milan Lucic	Making an obscene gesture during NHL Game No. 53 in Montreal on Thursday, October 16, 2014, at 19:40 of the third period.	–	$5,000.00	October 17, 2014
Brad Marchand	Slew-footing New York Rangers forward Derick Brassard during NHL Game No. 644 in Boston on Thursday, January 15, 2015, at 14:30 of the second period.	2 games	$48,387.10	January 16, 2015

== Schedule and results ==
=== Pre-season ===
2014 preseason game log: 3–2–2 (Home: 1–1–1; Road: 2–1–1)
#	Date	Visitor	Score	Home	OT	Decision	Attendance	Record	Recap
1	September 23	Boston Bruins	2–3	Montreal Canadiens		Subban	21,287	0–1–0	Recap
2	September 24	Washington Capitals	0–2	Boston Bruins		Smith	17,215	1–1–0	Recap
3	September 26	Boston Bruins	4–5	Washington Capitals	OT	Svedberg	17,426	1–1–1	Recap
4	September 27	Boston Bruins	3–1	Detroit Red Wings		Smith	15,976	2–1–1	Recap
5	September 30	New York Islanders	5–3	Boston Bruins		Smith	17,004	2–2–1	Recap
6	October 3	Boston Bruins	6–1	New York Islanders^{[a]}		Subban	8,600	3–2–1	Recap
7	October 4	Detroit Red Wings	4–3	Boston Bruins	SO	Rask	17,565	3–2–2	Recap
Notes:^{a} Game was played at Webster Bank Arena in Bridgeport, Connecticut.

=== Regular season ===
2014–15 Game Log

October: 6–6–0 (Home: 2–4–0; Road: 4–2–0)
#	Date	Visitor	Score	Home	OT	Decision	Attendance	Record	Pts	Recap
1	October 8	Philadelphia Flyers	1–2	Boston Bruins		Rask	17,565	1–0–0	2	Recap
2	October 9	Boston Bruins	1–2	Detroit Red Wings		Rask	20,027	1–1–0	2	Recap
3	October 11	Washington Capitals	4–0	Boston Bruins		Rask	17,565	1–2–0	2	Recap
4	October 13	Colorado Avalanche	2–1	Boston Bruins		Svedberg	17,565	1–3–0	2	Recap
5	October 15	Boston Bruins	3–2	Detroit Red Wings	SO	Rask	20,027	2–3–0	4	Recap
6	October 16	Boston Bruins	4–6	Montreal Canadiens		Rask	21,287	2–4–0	4	Recap
7	October 18	Boston Bruins	4–0	Buffalo Sabres		Svedberg	18,685	3–4–0	6	Recap
8	October 21	San Jose Sharks	3–5	Boston Bruins		Rask	17,565	4–4–0	8	Recap
9	October 23	New York Islanders	3–2	Boston Bruins		Svedberg	17,565	4–5–0	8	Recap
10	October 25	Boston Bruins	4–1	Toronto Maple Leafs		Rask	19,132	5–5–0	10	Recap
11	October 28	Minnesota Wild	4–3	Boston Bruins		Rask	17,565	5–6–0	10	Recap
12	October 30	Boston Bruins	3–2	Buffalo Sabres	OT	Svedberg	17,477	6–6–0	12	Recap

November: 7–3–1 (Home: 6–1–1; Road: 1–2–0)
#	Date	Visitor	Score	Home	OT	Decision	Attendance	Record	Pts	Recap
13	November 1	Ottawa Senators	2–4	Boston Bruins		Rask	17,565	7–6–0	14	Recap
14	November 4	Florida Panthers	1–2	Boston Bruins	OT	Rask	17,565	8–6–0	16	Recap
15	November 6	Edmonton Oilers	2–5	Boston Bruins		Rask	17,565	9–6–0	18	Recap
16	November 10	New Jersey Devils	2–4	Boston Bruins		Rask	17,565	10–6–0	20	Recap
17	November 12	Boston Bruins	1–6	Toronto Maple Leafs		Rask	19,264	10–7–0	20	Recap
18	November 13	Boston Bruins	1–5	Montreal Canadiens		Svedberg	21,287	10–8–0	20	Recap
19	November 15	Carolina Hurricanes	1–2	Boston Bruins		Rask	17,565	11–8–0	22	Recap
20	November 18	St. Louis Blues	0–2	Boston Bruins		Rask	17,565	12–8–0	24	Recap
21	November 21	Boston Bruins	4–3	Columbus Blue Jackets	SO	Svedberg	15,030	13–8–0	26	Recap
22	November 22	Montreal Canadiens	2–0	Boston Bruins		Rask	17,565	13–9–0	26	Recap
23	November 24	Pittsburgh Penguins	3–2	Boston Bruins	OT	Rask	17,565	13–9–1	27	Recap
24	November 28	Winnipeg Jets	1–2	Boston Bruins	OT	Rask	17,565	14–9–1	29	Recap

December: 5–6–3 (Home: 3–1–2; Road: 2–5–1)
#	Date	Visitor	Score	Home	OT	Decision	Attendance	Record	Pts	Recap
25	December 1	Boston Bruins	2–3	Anaheim Ducks		Rask	16,457	14–10–1	29	Recap
26	December 2	Boston Bruins	0–2	Los Angeles Kings		Svedberg	18,230	14–11–1	29	Recap
27	December 4	Boston Bruins	4–7	San Jose Sharks		Rask	17,404	14–12–1	29	Recap
28	December 6	Boston Bruins	5–2	Arizona Coyotes		Rask	13,114	15–12–1	31	Recap
29	December 11	Chicago Blackhawks	3–2	Boston Bruins		Rask	17,565	15–13–1	31	Recap
30	December 13	Ottawa Senators	3–2	Boston Bruins	SO	Rask	17,565	15–13–2	32	Recap
31	December 16	Boston Bruins	2–3	Nashville Predators	SO	Rask	17,113	15–13–3	33	Recap
32	December 17	Boston Bruins	3–2	Minnesota Wild	OT	Svedberg	18,841	16–13–3	35	Recap
33	December 19	Boston Bruins	1–2	Winnipeg Jets		Rask	15,016	16–14–3	35	Recap
34	December 21	Buffalo Sabres	3–4	Boston Bruins	OT	Rask	17,565	17–14–3	37	Recap
35	December 23	Nashville Predators	3–5	Boston Bruins		Rask	17,565	18–14–3	39	Recap
36	December 27	Boston Bruins	2–6	Columbus Blue Jackets		Rask	16,795	18–15–3	39	Recap
37	December 29	Detroit Red Wings	2–5	Boston Bruins		Rask	17,565	19–15–3	41	Recap
38	December 31	Toronto Maple Leafs	4–3	Boston Bruins	SO	Rask	17,565	19–15–4	42	Recap

January: 8–1–3 (Home: 4–1–1; Road: 4–0–2)
#	Date	Visitor	Score	Home	OT	Decision	Attendance	Record	Pts	Recap
39	January 3	Ottawa Senators	3–2	Boston Bruins	OT	Rask	17,565	19–15–5	43	Recap
40	January 4	Boston Bruins	1–2	Carolina Hurricanes	SO	Rask	17,212	19–15–6	44	Recap
41	January 7	Boston Bruins	3–2	Pittsburgh Penguins	OT	Rask	18,650	20–15–6	46	Recap
42	January 8	New Jersey Devils	0–3	Boston Bruins		Svedberg	17,565	21–15–6	48	Recap
43	January 10	Boston Bruins	3–1	Philadelphia Flyers		Rask	19,907	22–15–6	50	Recap
44	January 13	Tampa Bay Lightning	3–4	Boston Bruins		Rask	17,565	23–15–6	52	Recap
45	January 15	New York Rangers	0–3	Boston Bruins		Rask	17,565	24–15–6	54	Recap
46	January 17	Columbus Blue Jackets	3–1	Boston Bruins		Rask	17,565	24–16–6	54	Recap
47	January 20	Boston Bruins	3–1	Dallas Stars		Rask	17,432	25–16–6	56	Recap
48	January 21	Boston Bruins	2–3	Colorado Avalanche	SO	Rask	16,832	25–16–7	57	Recap
49	January 29	Boston Bruins	5–2	New York Islanders		Rask	16,170	26–16–7	59	Recap
50	January 31	Los Angeles Kings	1–3	Boston Bruins		Rask	17,565	27–16–7	61	Recap

February: 4–6–2 (Home: 2–3–0; Road: 2–3–2)
#	Date	Visitor	Score	Home	OT	Decision	Attendance	Record	Pts	Recap
51	February 4	Boston Bruins	2–3	New York Rangers		Rask	18,006	27–17–7	61	Recap
52	February 7	New York Islanders	1–2	Boston Bruins		Rask	17,565	28–17–7	63	Recap
53	February 8	Montreal Canadiens	3–1	Boston Bruins		Rask	17,565	28–18–7	63	Recap
54	February 10	Dallas Stars	5–3	Boston Bruins		Rask	17,565	28–19–7	63	Recap
55	February 13	Boston Bruins	2–5	Vancouver Canucks		Rask	18,870	28–20–7	63	Recap
56	February 16	Boston Bruins	3–4	Calgary Flames	OT	Rask	19,289	28–20–8	64	Recap
57	February 18	Boston Bruins	3–4	Edmonton Oilers	SO	Rask	16,839	28–20–9	65	Recap
58	February 20	Boston Bruins	1–5	St. Louis Blues		Subban	19,172	28–21–9	65	Recap
59	February 22	Boston Bruins	6–2	Chicago Blackhawks		Rask	22,104	29–21–9	67	Recap
60	February 24	Vancouver Canucks	2–1	Boston Bruins		Rask	17,565	29–22–9	67	Recap
61	February 27	Boston Bruins	3–2	New Jersey Devils	OT	Svedberg	16,592	30–22–9	69	Recap
62	February 28	Arizona Coyotes	1–4	Boston Bruins		Rask	17,565	31–22–9	71	Recap

March: 8–3–4 (Home: 5–0–3; Road: 3–3–1)
#	Date	Visitor	Score	Home	OT	Decision	Attendance	Record	Pts	Recap
63	March 5	Calgary Flames	4–3	Boston Bruins	SO	Rask	19,289	31–22–10	72	Recap
64	March 7	Philadelphia Flyers	2–3	Boston Bruins	OT	Rask	17,565	32–22–10	74	Recap
65	March 8	Detroit Red Wings	3–5	Boston Bruins		Svedberg	17,565	33–22–10	76	Recap
66	March 10	Boston Bruins	3–1	Ottawa Senators		Rask	18,961	34–22–10	78	Recap
67	March 12	Tampa Bay Lightning	2–3	Boston Bruins	SO	Rask	17,565	35–22–10	80	Recap
68	March 14	Boston Bruins	2–0	Pittsburgh Penguins		Rask	18,651	36–22–10	82	Recap
69	March 15	Boston Bruins	0–2	Washington Capitals		Rask	18,506	36–23–10	82	Recap
70	March 17	Buffalo Sabres	2–1	Boston Bruins	SO	Svedberg	17,565	36–23–11	83	Recap
71	March 19	Boston Bruins	4–6	Ottawa Senators		Rask	19,270	36–24–11	83	Recap
72	March 21	Boston Bruins	1–2	Florida Panthers	SO	Rask	17,044	36–24–12	84	Recap
73	March 22	Boston Bruins	3–5	Tampa Bay Lightning		Rask	19,204	36–25–12	84	Recap
74	March 26	Anaheim Ducks	3–2	Boston Bruins	OT	Rask	17,565	36–25–13	85	Recap
75	March 28	New York Rangers	2–4	Boston Bruins		Rask	17,565	37–25–13	87	Recap
76	March 29	Boston Bruins	2–1	Carolina Hurricanes	OT	Rask	14,275	38–25–13	89	Recap
77	March 31	Florida Panthers	2–3	Boston Bruins		Rask	17,565	39–25–13	91	Recap

April: 2–2–1 (Home: 1–0–0; Road: 1–2–1)
#	Date	Visitor	Score	Home	OT	Decision	Attendance	Record	Pts	Recap
78	April 2	Boston Bruins	3–2	Detroit Red Wings		Rask	20,027	40–25–13	93	Recap
79	April 4	Toronto Maple Leafs	1–2	Boston Bruins	SO	Rask	17,565	41–25–13	95	Recap
80	April 8	Boston Bruins	0–3	Washington Capitals		Rask	18,506	41–26–13	95	Recap
81	April 9	Boston Bruins	2–4	Florida Panthers		Rask	11,778	41–27–13	95	Recap
82	April 11	Boston Bruins	2–3	Tampa Bay Lightning	SO	Rask	19,204	41–27–14	96	Recap

Legend: Win (2 points) Loss (0 points) Overtime/shootout loss (1 point)

== Player stats ==
Final

Skaters

Regular season
Player	GP	G	A	Pts	+/−	PIM
Patrice Bergeron	81	23	32	55	2	44
Loui Eriksson	81	22	25	47	1	14
Milan Lucic	81	18	26	44	13	81
Carl Soderberg	82	13	31	44	10	26
Brad Marchand	77	24	18	42	5	95
Dougie Hamilton	72	10	32	42	−3	41
Reilly Smith	81	13	27	40	7	20
Torey Krug	78	12	27	39	13	20
David Krejci	47	7	24	31	7	22
Chris Kelly	80	7	21	28	6	48
David Pastrnak	46	10	17	27	12	8
Zdeno Chara	63	8	12	20	0	42
Ryan Spooner	29	8	10	18	2	2
Dennis Seidenberg	82	3	11	14	−1	34
Daniel Paille	71	6	7	13	−9	12
Gregory Campbell	70	6	6	12	1	45
Seth Griffith	30	6	4	10	−2	6
Kevan Miller	41	2	5	7	20	15
Adam McQuaid	63	1	6	7	−2	85
Zach Trotman	27	1	4	5	−2	0
Simon Gagne	23	3	1	4	0	4
Matt Bartkowski	47	0	4	4	−6	37
Matt Fraser^{‡}	24	3	0	3	−5	7
Craig Cunningham^{‡}	32	2	1	3	−4	2
Maxime Talbot^{†}	18	0	3	3	−3	2
Brett Connolly^{†}	5	0	2	2	−1	10
Joe Morrow	15	1	0	1	3	4
David Warsofsky	4	0	1	1	1	0
Brian Ferlin	7	0	1	1	0	0
Bobby Robins	3	0	0	0	0	14
Alexander Khokhlachev	3	0	0	0	−2	0
Matt Lindblad	2	0	0	0	0	0
Jordan Caron^{‡}	11	0	0	0	−1	16

Goaltenders

Regular season
Player	GP	GS	TOI	W	L	OT	GA	GAA	SA	SV%	SO
Tuukka Rask	70	67	4063	34	21	13	156	2.30	2011	0.922	3
Niklas Svedberg	18	14	900	7	5	1	35	2.33	425	0.918	2
Malcolm Subban	1	1	31	0	1	0	3	5.81	6	0.500	0

- ^{†}Denotes player spent time with another team before joining Bruins. Stats reflect time with the Bruins only.
- ^{‡}Denotes player was traded mid-season. Stats reflect time with the Bruins only.

== Notable achievements ==
=== Awards ===
Regular season
Player	Award	Awarded
P. Bergeron	NHL All-Star Game selection	January 10, 2015
T. Rask	NHL Third Star of the Month	February 2, 2015

=== Milestones ===
Regular season
Player	Milestone	Reached
B. Robins	1st Career NHL Game	October 8, 2014
S. Griffith	1st Career NHL Game	October 13, 2014
M. Lucic	300th Career NHL Point	October 16, 2014
S. Griffith	1st Career NHL Goal; 1st Career NHL Point	October 21, 2014
S. Griffith	1st Career NHL Assist	October 23, 2014
Z. Trotman	1st Career NHL Assist; 1st Career NHL Point	October 28, 2014
J. Morrow	1st Career NHL Game	October 30, 2014
L. Eriksson	400th Career NHL Point	October 30, 2014
D. Seidenberg	200th Career NHL Point	October 30, 2014
M. Lucic	500th Career NHL Game	November 6, 2014
B. Marchand	100th Career NHL Assist	November 15, 2014
C. Soderberg	100th Career NHL Game	November 21, 2014
T. Krug	100th Career NHL Game	November 22, 2014
D. Pastrnak	1st Career NHL Game	November 24, 2014
J. Morrow	1st Career NHL Goal; 1st Career NHL Point	November 24, 2014
D. Pastrnak	1st Career NHL Assist; 1st Career NHL Point	December 1, 2014
S. Gagne	600th Career NHL Point	December 1, 2014
B. Marchand	200th Career NHL Point	December 4, 2014
B. Marchand	100th Career NHL Goal	December 6, 2014
C. Cunningham	1st Career NHL Goal; 1st Career NHL Point	December 13, 2014
M. Bartkowski	100th Career NHL Game	December 21, 2014
C. Kelly	700th Career NHL Game	January 8, 2015
P. Bergeron	700th Career NHL Game	January 8, 2015
D. Pastrnak	1st Career NHL Goal	January 10, 2015
D. Krejci	400th Career NHL Point	January 21, 2015
G. Campbell	700th Career NHL Game	February 10, 2015
B. Ferlin	1st Career NHL Game	February 20, 2015
M. Subban	1st Career NHL Game	February 20, 2015
P. Bergeron	200th Career NHL Goal	February 22, 2015
B. Ferlin	1st Career NHL Assist; 1st Career NHL Point	February 22, 2015
R. Spooner	1st Career NHL Goal	February 27, 2015
M. Lucic	200th Career NHL Assist	March 10, 2015
Z. Trotman	1st Career NHL Goal	April 2, 2015
R. Smith	100th Career NHL Point	April 2, 2015
R. Smith	200th Career NHL Game	April 4, 2015

== Transactions ==
The Bruins have been involved in the following transactions during the 2014–15 season:

=== Trades ===
October 4, 2014	To New York Islanders Johnny Boychuk	To Boston Bruins PHI's 2nd-round pick in 2015; NYI's 2nd-round pick in 2016 conditional 3rd-round pick in 2015
March 2, 2015	To Tampa Bay Lightning 2nd-round pick in 2015; 2nd-round pick in 2016	To Boston Bruins Brett Connolly
March 2, 2015	To Colorado Avalanche Jordan Caron; 6th-round pick in 2016	To Boston Bruins Maxime Talbot; Paul Carey
March 2, 2015	To Minnesota Wild Jared Knight	To Boston Bruins Zack Phillips
June 25, 2015	To Colorado Avalanche Carl Soderberg (rights)	To Boston Bruins BOS's 6th-round pick in 2016

=== Free agents acquired ===
Date	Player	Former team	Contract terms (in U.S. dollars)	Ref
July 1, 2014	Chris Breen	Calgary Flames	1 year, $600,000	
July 1, 2014	Jeremy Smith	Springfield Falcons	1 year, $550,000	
October 14, 2014	Simon Gagne	Philadelphia Flyers	1 year, $600,000	
March 5, 2015	Justin Hickman	Seattle Thunderbirds	entry-level contract	
March 12, 2015	Frank Vatrano	University of Massachusetts	entry-level contract	
April 1, 2015	Austin Czarnik	Miami University (Ohio)	entry-level contract	
May 21, 2015	Joonas Kemppainen	Karpat	1 year, $700,000	
June 8, 2015	Noel Acciari	Providence College	entry-level contract	

=== Free agents lost ===
Date	Player	New team	Contract terms (in U.S. dollars)	Ref
July 1, 2014	Chad Johnson	New York Islanders	2 years, $2.6 million	
July 1, 2014	Shawn Thornton	Florida Panthers	2 years, $2.4 million	
July 1, 2014	Andrej Meszaros	Buffalo Sabres	1 year, $4.125 million	
July 1, 2014	Jarome Iginla	Colorado Avalanche	3 years, $16 million	
July 1, 2014	Mike Moore	Washington Capitals	1 year, $550,000	
September 5, 2014	Corey Potter	Calgary Flames	1 year	

=== Claimed via waivers ===
Player	Previous team	Date

=== Lost via waivers ===
Player	New team	Date
Matt Fraser	Edmonton Oilers	December 29, 2014
Craig Cunningham	Arizona Coyotes	March 2, 2015

=== Player signings ===
Date	Player	Contract terms (in U.S. dollars)	Ref
July 15, 2014	Matt Bartkowski	1 year, $1.25 million	
July 15, 2014	David Pastrnak	3-year, $2.775 million entry-level contract	
July 16, 2014	Jordan Caron	1 year, $600,000	
July 18, 2014	Tommy Cross	1 year, $600,000	
July 18, 2014	Craig Cunningham	1 year, $600,000	
July 18, 2014	Justin Florek	1 year, $600,000	
July 18, 2014	Tyler Randell	1 year, $575,000	
July 18, 2014	Zach Trotman	2 years, $1.25 million	
July 24, 2014	David Warsofsky	1 year, $600,000	
September 4, 2014	David Krejci	6 years, $43.5 million contract extension	
September 5, 2014	Matt Fraser	1 year, $625,000	
September 29, 2014	Reilly Smith	1 year, $1.4 million	
September 29, 2014	Torey Krug	1 year, $1.4 million	
March 6, 2015	Reilly Smith	2 years, $6.85 million contract extension	
March 6, 2015	Torey Krug	1 year, $3.4 million contract extension	
May 29, 2015	Anton Blidh	3 years, entry-level contract	
June 18, 2015	Tommy Cross	1 year, $600,000	
June 18, 2015	Tyler Randell	1 year, $600,000	
June 23, 2015	Zane McIntyre	2 years, entry-level contract	

=== Other ===
Name	Date	Details
Joe Sacco	July 24, 2014	Named as an Assistant Coach

== Draft picks ==
Below are the Boston Bruins' selections made at the 2014 NHL entry draft, held on June 27–28, 2014 at the Wells Fargo Center in Philadelphia, Pennsylvania.

Round	#	Player	Pos	Nationality	College/Junior/Club team (League)
1	25	David Pastrnak	(RW)	Czech Republic	Sodertalje SK (HockeyAllsvenskan)
2	56	Ryan Donato	(C)	United States	Dexter School (USHS–MA)
4	116	Danton Heinen	(F)	Canada	Surrey Eagles (BCHL)
5	146	Anders Bjork	(LW)	United States	US NTDP (USHL)
7	206	Emil Johansson	D	Sweden	HV71 Jr. (Sweden-Jr.)

Draft notes

- Boston's third-round pick will go to the Philadelphia Flyers as the result of a trade on March 5, 2014, that sent Andrej Meszaros to Boston in exchange for this pick (being conditional at the time of the trade). The condition – Philadelphia will receive a third-round pick in 2014 if Meszaros does not re-sign with Boston prior to the 2014 NHL Entry Draft – was converted on June 27, 2014.
- Boston's sixth-round pick will go to the St. Louis Blues, as the result of a trade on April 3, 2013, that sent Wade Redden to Boston, in exchange for this pick (being conditional at the time of the trade). The condition – St. Louis will receive a sixth-round pick in 2014 if Redden appears in one playoff game in 2013 for the Bruins – was converted on May 1, 2013.
