= Pachal (surname) =

Pachal is a surname. Notable people with the surname include:

- Brayden Pachal (born 1999), Canadian ice hockey player
- Clayton Pachal (1956–2021), Canadian ice hockey player
- Vern Pachal (born 1930), Canadian ice hockey player

== See also ==
- Pachal, for places and other uses
