= Pachal =

Pachal may refer to:

- Pachal (surname)
- Pachal, Thiruvannamalai, Tamil Nadu, India
- Pachal, Namakkal, Tamil Nadu, India
- Pachal, Iran
- Pachal (or Pasteal) people, North American Indian tribe related to the Coahuiltecan people
