= Brayden Pachal =

Canadian ice hockey player (born 1999)

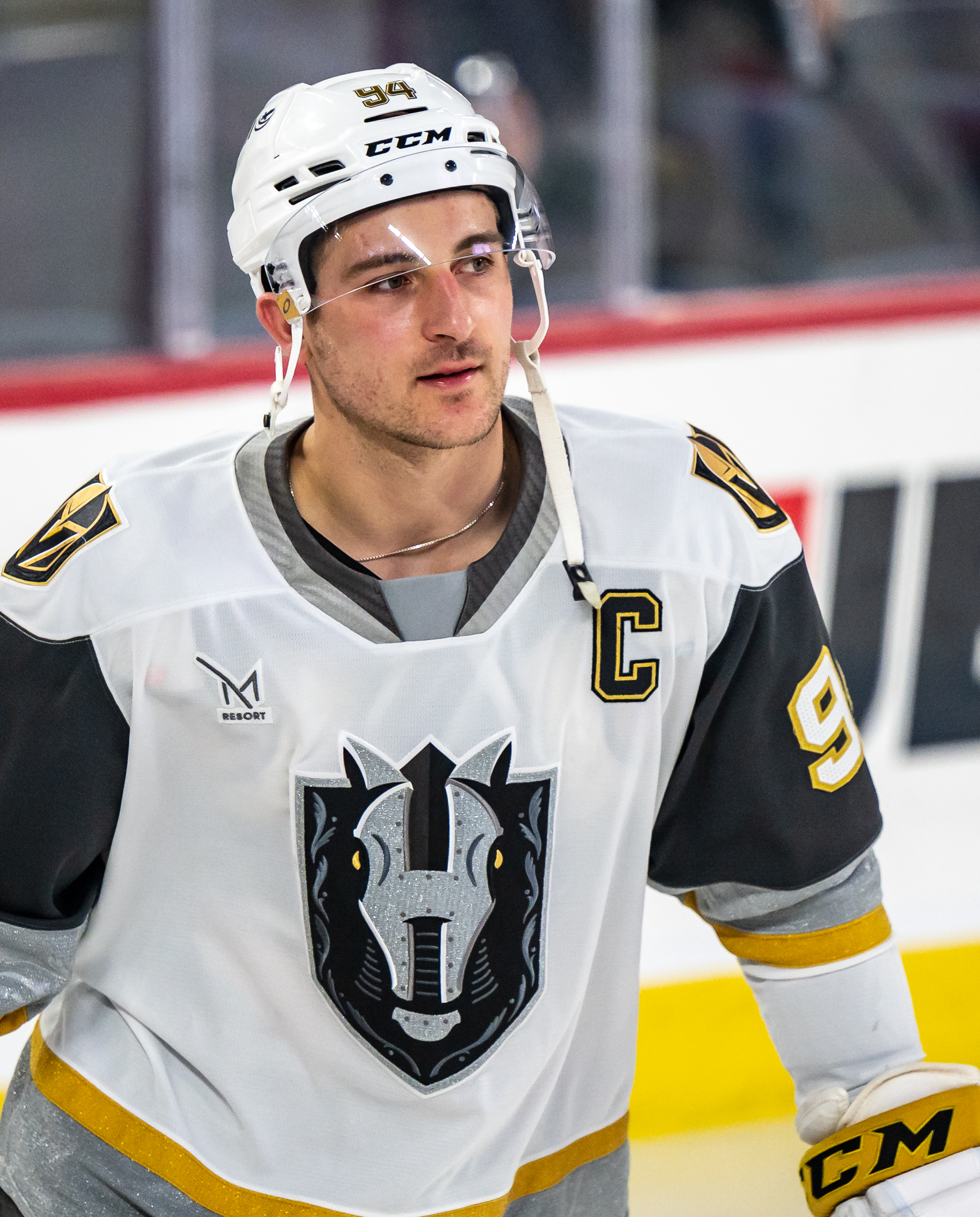
- Pachal with the Henderson Silver Knights in 2023
- Born: August 23, 1999 (age 27) Estevan, Saskatchewan, Canada
- Height: 6 ft 0 in (183 cm)
- Weight: 201 lb (91 kg; 14 st 5 lb)
- Position: Defence
- Shoots: Right
- NHL team Former teams: Calgary Flames; Vegas Golden Knights
- NHL draft: Undrafted
- Playing career: 2019–present

Brayden Pachal (born August 23, 1999) is a Canadian professional ice hockey player who is a defenceman for the Calgary Flames of the National Hockey League (NHL). He previously played for the Vegas Golden Knights, with whom he won the Stanley Cup in 2023.

== Playing career ==
Pachal began in Junior A hockey with the Estevan Bruins of the Saskatchewan Junior Hockey League (SJHL), before joining the Victoria Royals of the Western Hockey League (WHL) for the 2015–16 season. Pachal spent a season and a half with Victoria, before being traded to the Prince Albert Raiders during the 2016–17 season. Pachal would then spend the next two seasons with Prince Albert, being named captain of the team ahead of the 2018–19 season; the same year, Pachal would lead the Raiders to their second WHL Championship.

As an undrafted free agent, Pachal was signed to a three-year entry-level contract by the Vegas Golden Knights on September 20, 2019, joining Vegas' then-American Hockey League (AHL) affiliate Chicago Wolves shortly afterward.

On January 20, 2022, in the midst of the 2021–22 season, Pachal was named captain of the Henderson Silver Knights, Vegas' new AHL affiliate. Pachal made his NHL debut with Vegas on March 15, 2022.

As a restricted free agent, Pachal signed a one-year contract extension with Vegas on July 28, 2022. Pachal recorded his first NHL point on December 15, 2022, with a secondary assist on Reilly Smith's empty-net goal against the Chicago Blackhawks. Pachal then made his NHL playoff debut on April 27, 2023, in the series-clinching game five of the Golden Knights' first-round series against the Winnipeg Jets. Vegas then went on to win the Stanley Cup Final; despite Pachal only playing ten regular-season games and one playoff game, the Golden Knights requested an exemption to have Pachal's name engraved on the Stanley Cup alongside the rest of the team.

At the conclusion of his contract, and again as a restricted free agent, Pachal signed a further two-year extension with Vegas on June 28, 2023. After making the Golden Knights' opening-night roster for the 2023–24 season, Pachal scored his first NHL goal on October 12, 2023, against the San Jose Sharks.

After 17 games with Vegas during the 2023–24 season, Pachal was placed on waivers on February 3, 2024, and claimed by the Calgary Flames the following day. Establishing himself as a steady presence on the Flames' blueline early into the 2024–25 season, Pachal signed a 2-year, $2.375 million extension with Flames on December 17, 2024.

== Family ==
Pachal is a grandson of Vern Pachal, who played for the University of Alberta and at the minor professional level in the early 1950s in the Eastern Hockey League and American Hockey League. His second cousin Clayton Pachal played in the NHL for the Boston Bruins and Colorado Rockies.

== Career statistics ==
| | | | Regular season | | | | | Playoffs |
| Season | Team | League | GP | G | A | Pts | PIM | GP | G | A | Pts | PIM |
|---|---|---|---|---|---|---|---|---|---|---|---|---|
| 2014–15 | Estevan Bruins | SJHL | 3 | 0 | 1 | 1 | 0 | 3 | 1 | 0 | 1 | 2 |
| 2015–16 | Victoria Royals | WHL | 40 | 1 | 5 | 6 | 29 | 12 | 0 | 1 | 1 | 8 |
| 2016–17 | Victoria Royals | WHL | 35 | 0 | 3 | 3 | 46 | — | — | — | — | — |
| 2016–17 | Prince Albert Raiders | WHL | 30 | 3 | 9 | 12 | 37 | — | — | — | — | — |
| 2017–18 | Prince Albert Raiders | WHL | 68 | 7 | 19 | 26 | 100 | 7 | 1 | 3 | 4 | 6 |
| 2018–19 | Prince Albert Raiders | WHL | 66 | 15 | 36 | 51 | 113 | 23 | 1 | 7 | 8 | 28 |
| 2019–20 | Chicago Wolves | AHL | 48 | 1 | 9 | 10 | 44 | — | — | — | — | — |
| 2019–20 | Fort Wayne Komets | ECHL | 4 | 0 | 2 | 2 | 2 | — | — | — | — | — |
| 2020–21 | Henderson Silver Knights | AHL | 24 | 2 | 5 | 7 | 16 | 5 | 0 | 2 | 2 | 5 |
| 2021–22 | Henderson Silver Knights | AHL | 65 | 2 | 9 | 11 | 90 | 2 | 0 | 0 | 0 | 4 |
| 2021–22 | Vegas Golden Knights | NHL | 2 | 0 | 0 | 0 | 0 | — | — | — | — | — |
| 2022–23 | Henderson Silver Knights | AHL | 55 | 3 | 12 | 15 | 90 | — | — | — | — | — |
| 2022–23 | Vegas Golden Knights | NHL | 10 | 0 | 2 | 2 | 8 | 1 | 0 | 0 | 0 | 2 |
| 2023–24 | Vegas Golden Knights | NHL | 17 | 1 | 0 | 1 | 12 | — | — | — | — | — |
| 2023–24 | Calgary Flames | NHL | 33 | 1 | 5 | 6 | 39 | — | — | — | — | — |
| 2024–25 | Calgary Flames | NHL | 76 | 3 | 9 | 12 | 88 | — | — | — | — | — |
| 2025–26 | Calgary Flames | NHL | 39 | 1 | 6 | 7 | 47 | — | — | — | — | — |
| NHL totals | | | 177 | 6 | 22 | 28 | 194 | 1 | 0 | 0 | 0 | 2 |

== Awards and honours ==
| Award | Year |
WHL
| Champion | 2019 |
| East Second All-Star Team | 2019 |
AHL
| All-Star Game | 2023 |
NHL
| Stanley Cup champion | 2023 |
