= Zach Trotman =

American ice hockey player (born 1990)

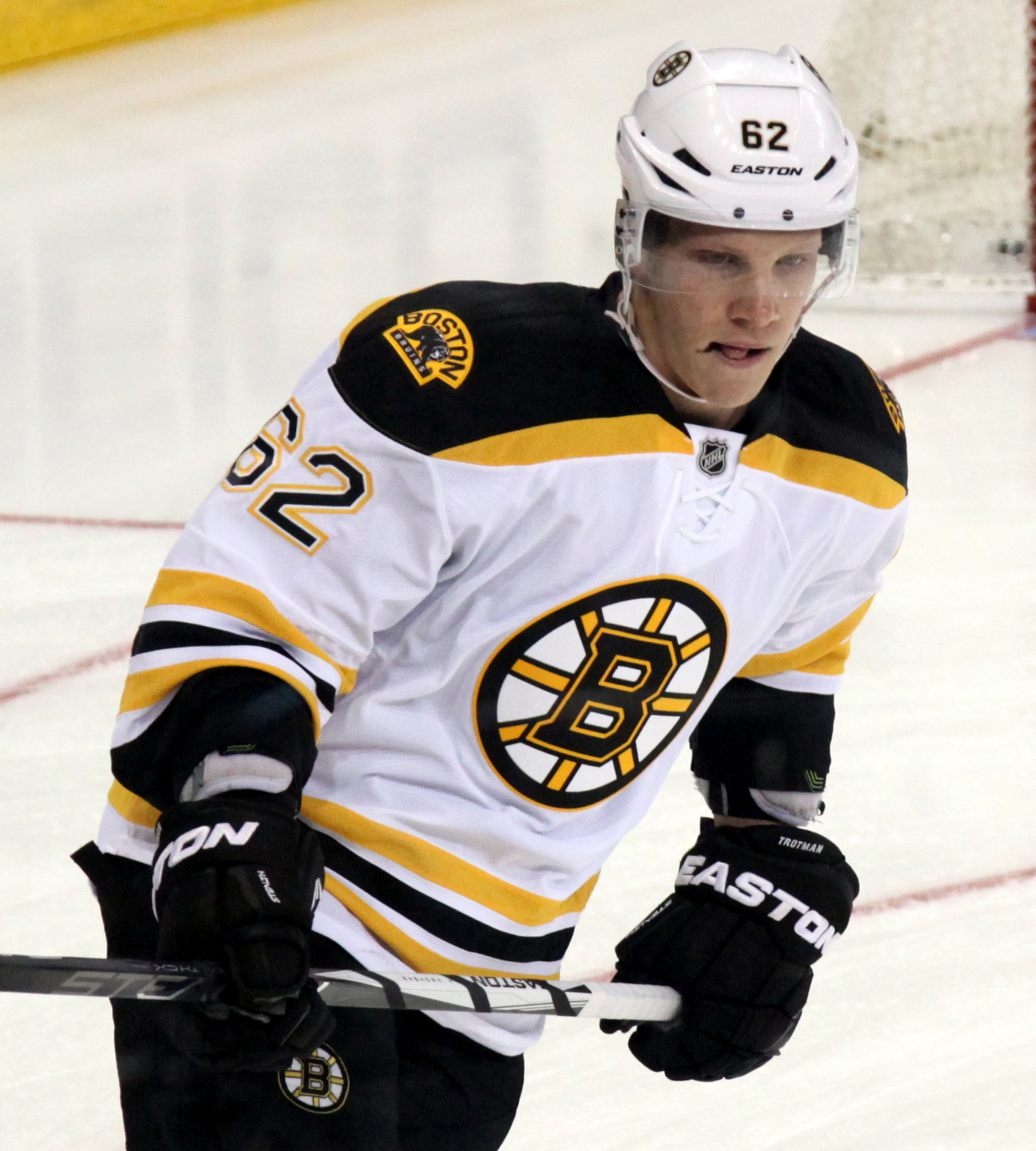
- Trotman with the Boston Bruins in 2015
- Born: August 28, 1990 (age 35) Carmel, Indiana, U.S.
- Height: 6 ft 3 in (191 cm)
- Weight: 217 lb (98 kg; 15 st 7 lb)
- Position: Defense
- Shot: Right
- Played for: Boston Bruins; Pittsburgh Penguins
- NHL draft: 210th overall, 2010; Boston Bruins
- Playing career: 2012–2021

Zachary Ross Trotman (born August 26, 1990) is an American former professional ice hockey defenseman. He played in the National Hockey League (NHL) with the Boston Bruins and Pittsburgh Penguins. Trotman was selected by the Bruins in the seventh round (210th overall) of the 2010 NHL entry draft, making him the last pick in the draft. He was born in Carmel, Indiana but raised in Novi, Michigan.

== Playing career ==
While playing for the Wichita Falls Wildcats of the North American Hockey League (NAHL), Trotman committed to Lake Superior State University.

After graduating from Novi High School, Trotman played three seasons (2009–2012) of NCAA Division I college ice hockey with the Lake Superior State Lakers men's ice hockey team. Trotman was drafted by the Boston Bruins in the 2010 NHL entry draft after his freshman year at Lake Superior State. Forgoing his final year of NCAA eligibility, on March 25, 2012, Trotman signed a three-year, entry-level contract with the Boston Bruins.

On December 28, 2013, with a season-ending injury to defenseman Dennis Seidenberg, Trotman was called up to the Boston Bruins from the Providence Bruins and made his NHL debut against the Ottawa Senators. Trotman scored his first NHL career goal on April 2, 2015, as the winning goal in a 3-2 regulation time Boston road win over the Detroit Red Wings.

On July 1, 2016, Trotman signed as a free agent to a one-year, one-way contract with the Los Angeles Kings. He was assigned to the Kings AHL affiliate, the Ontario Reign, and was limited to just 9 games before missing the remainder of the 2016–17 season, due to an upper body injury.

On July 1, 2017, Trotman left the Kings as a free agent and signed a one-year, two-way deal worth $650,000 with the defending Stanley Cup champions, the Pittsburgh Penguins. He spent the majority of the season with their American Hockey League affiliate, the Wilkes-Barre/Scranton Penguins, recording 17 points in 49 games. Following the season, the Penguins re-signed Trotman to another one-year, two-way contract. After attending training camp, Trotman was reassigned to the Wilkes-Barre/Scranton Penguins to begin the 2018–19 season. Once again, Trotman spent the majority of the season in the AHL, only playing 13 games in the NHL during the regular season. Prior to his re-call to Pittsburgh in February, Trotman played 24 games in the AHL and recorded five points. On June 26, 2019, the Penguins re-signed him to a two-year contract worth an average annual value of $700,000 at the NHL level.

Following the 2020–21 season, his 10th professional season, Trotman as an impending free agent announced his retirement from hockey due to the physical toll on his health on June 19, 2021. He finished his career having played in 93 NHL games, collecting three goals and 13 points.

== Personal life ==
Trotman married his fiancé Jeanna in July 2017. Jeanna was also an athlete at Lake Superior State, competing in volleyball. They had their first child together, a son, in December 2020.

== Career statistics ==
			Regular season					Playoffs
Season	Team	League	GP	G	A	Pts	PIM	GP	G	A	Pts	PIM
2008–09	Wichita Falls Wildcats	NAHL	47	2	4	6	79	5	0	1	1	8
2009–10	Lake Superior State University	CCHA	36	2	6	8	18	—	—	—	—	—
2010–11	Lake Superior State University	CCHA	38	6	14	20	12	—	—	—	—	—
2011–12	Lake Superior State University	CCHA	40	11	10	21	12	—	—	—	—	—
2011–12	Providence Bruins	AHL	9	1	2	3	2	—	—	—	—	—
2012–13	Providence Bruins	AHL	48	2	14	16	19	4	0	0	0	0
2013–14	Providence Bruins	AHL	53	8	16	24	21	8	0	4	4	14
2013–14	Boston Bruins	NHL	2	0	0	0	0	—	—	—	—	—
2014–15	Providence Bruins	AHL	40	2	11	13	27	5	1	0	1	2
2014–15	Boston Bruins	NHL	27	1	4	5	0	—	—	—	—	—
2015–16	Boston Bruins	NHL	38	2	5	7	22	—	—	—	—	—
2016–17	Ontario Reign	AHL	9	0	2	2	26	—	—	—	—	—
2017–18	Wilkes-Barre/Scranton Penguins	AHL	49	7	10	17	25	3	0	1	1	0
2017–18	Pittsburgh Penguins	NHL	3	0	0	0	0	—	—	—	—	—
2018–19	Wilkes-Barre/Scranton Penguins	AHL	24	1	4	5	39	—	—	—	—	—
2018–19	Pittsburgh Penguins	NHL	13	0	1	1	4	—	—	—	—	—
2019–20	Wilkes-Barre/Scranton Penguins	AHL	27	4	10	14	15	—	—	—	—	—
2019–20	Pittsburgh Penguins	NHL	8	0	0	0	4	—	—	—	—	—
2020–21	Wilkes-Barre/Scranton Penguins	AHL	8	0	2	2	4	—	—	—	—	—
NHL totals			91	3	10	13	30	—	—	—	—	—
