= Pachal, Iran =

Pachal پاچال
- Village
- Location within Iran
- Coordinates: 34°06′22″N 47°50′13″E
- Country: Iran
- Province: Lorestan
- County: Delfan
- Bakhsh: Central
- Rural District: Nurabad

Population (2006)
  - Total: 14
- Time zone: UTC+3:30 (IRST)
  - Summer (DST): UTC+4:30 (IRDT)

Pachal (Persian: پاچال, also Romanized as Pāchāl; also known as Pāchāl-e Cherāgh Khān and Pāchāl-e Soflá) is a village in Nurabad Rural District, in the Central District of Delfan County, Lorestan Province, Iran. At the 2006 census, its population was 14, in 4 families.
