= Ryan Button =

Canadian-German ice hockey player

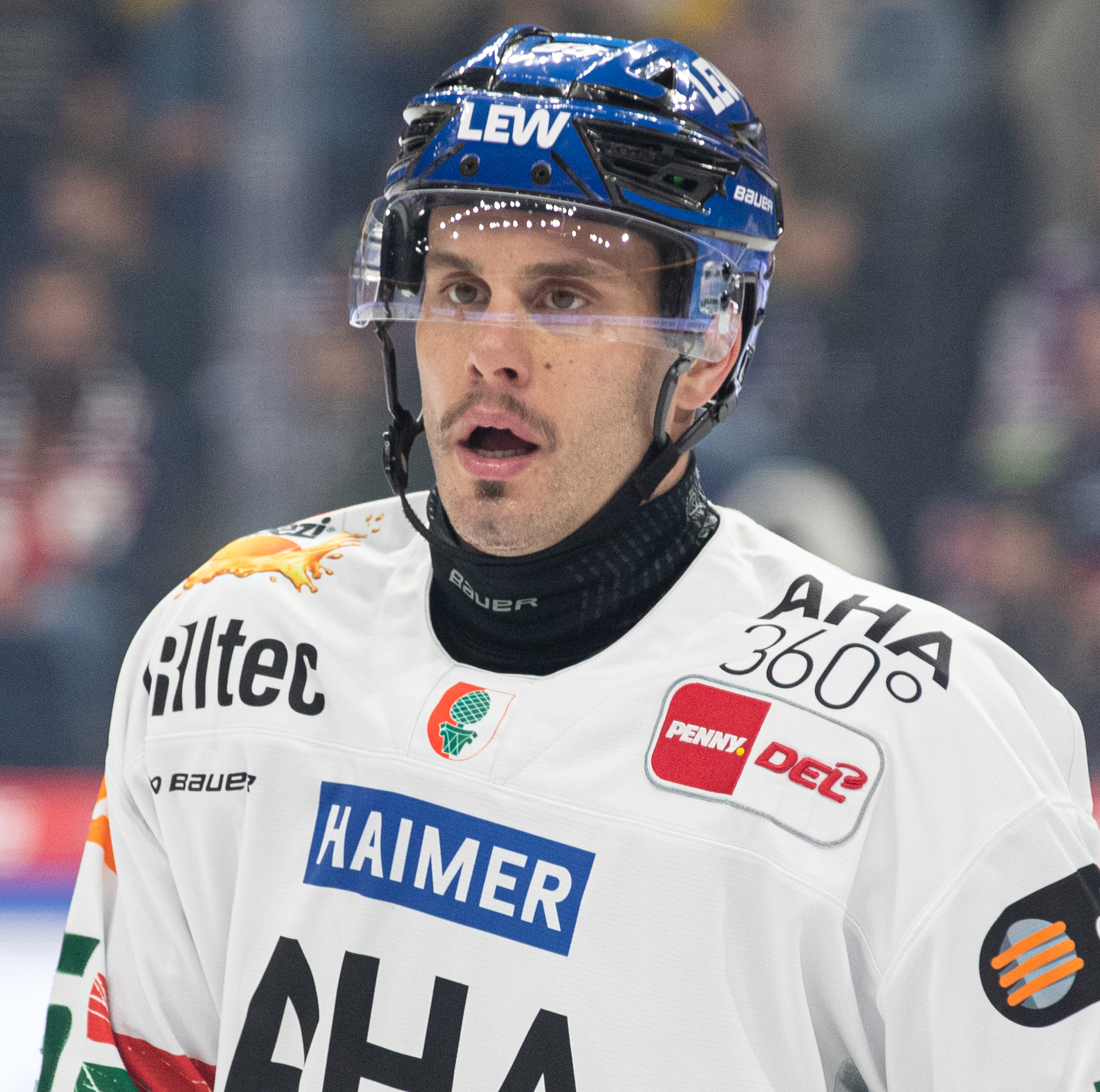
- Button with the Augsburger Panther in 2025
- Born: March 26, 1991 (age 35) Edmonton, Alberta, Canada
- Height: 6 ft 1 in (185 cm)
- Weight: 192 lb (87 kg; 13 st 10 lb)
- Position: Defence
- Shoots: Left
- DEL team Former teams: Augsburger Panther; Providence Bruins; Texas Stars; Iserlohn Roosters; EHC München; Grizzlys Wolfsburg
- NHL draft: 86th overall, 2009; Boston Bruins
- Playing career: 2011–present

Ryan Button (born March 26, 1991) is a Canadian-German professional ice hockey defenceman. He is currently a playing with Augsburger Panther of the Deutsche Eishockey Liga (DEL). Button was selected by the Boston Bruins in the 3rd round (86th overall) of the 2009 NHL entry draft. He has dual citizenship between Canada and Germany with origins in Wuppertal, Germany.

== Playing career ==
Button played major junior hockey in the Western Hockey League (WHL) with the Prince Albert Raiders and the Seattle Thunderbirds.

Button made his professional debut in the American Hockey League with the Providence Bruins during the 2010–11 season, and on May 4, 2011, the Boston Bruins signed Button to a three-year entry-level contract.

On July 4, 2013 a blockbuster trade took place between the Dallas Stars and Boston Bruins sending Loui Eriksson to Boston and Tyler Seguin to Dallas in a 7 player deal. Boston traded Button, Seguin, and Rich Peverley to Dallas in exchange for Eriksson, Joe Morrow, Reilly Smith, and Matt Fraser.

After a season within the Stars organization, Button left at the expiry of his contract, to sign abroad with German team, Iserlohn Roosters of the DEL, on July 24, 2014. In the midst of the 2014–15 season, having adapted quickly to the German league, Button was signed to a two-year contract extension to remain with the Roosters on January 2, 2015.

At the completion of the 2016–17 season, his third with the Roosters, Button left as a free agent to sign a one-year deal with fellow German outfit, EHC München, on June 2, 2017. Button played two seasons with München capturing the DEL championship in the 2017–18 season.

On May 20, 2019, Button left München as a free agent to sign a two-year contract with his third DEL club, Grizzlys Wolfsburg.

Button played six seasons in Wolfsburg before he left as a free agent to sign a one-year contract with Augsburger Panther on April 11, 2025.

== Career statistics ==
=== Regular season and playoffs ===
			Regular season					Playoffs
Season	Team	League	GP	G	A	Pts	PIM	GP	G	A	Pts	PIM
2007–08	Prince Albert Raiders	WHL	58	0	8	8	30	—	—	—	—	—
2008–09	Prince Albert Raiders	WHL	70	5	32	37	43	—	—	—	—	—
2009–10	Prince Albert Raiders	WHL	67	6	27	33	46	—	—	—	—	—
2010–11	Prince Albert Raiders	WHL	44	3	20	23	31	—	—	—	—	—
2010–11	Seattle Thunderbirds	WHL	25	2	10	12	18	—	—	—	—	—
2010–11	Providence Bruins	AHL	7	0	1	1	2	—	—	—	—	—
2011–12	Providence Bruins	AHL	28	0	2	2	16	—	—	—	—	—
2011–12	Reading Royals	ECHL	30	1	5	6	14	—	—	—	—	—
2012–13	Providence Bruins	AHL	25	0	0	0	15	6	0	0	0	4
2012–13	South Carolina Stingrays	ECHL	5	0	0	0	4	4	0	1	1	2
2013–14	Texas Stars	AHL	26	3	0	3	32	—	—	—	—	—
2013–14	Idaho Steelheads	ECHL	33	7	16	23	24	1	0	0	0	0
2014–15	Iserlohn Roosters	DEL	49	6	15	21	40	7	0	0	0	8
2015–16	Iserlohn Roosters	DEL	52	6	23	29	38	6	0	0	0	6
2016–17	Iserlohn Roosters	DEL	49	4	18	22	20	—	—	—	—	—
2017–18	EHC München	DEL	51	6	10	16	20	15	0	5	5	16
2018–19	EHC München	DEL	48	3	14	17	18	18	0	2	2	24
2019–20	Grizzlys Wolfsburg	DEL	34	2	13	15	10	—	—	—	—	—
2020–21	Grizzlys Wolfsburg	DEL	22	1	8	9	6	—	—	—	—	—
2021–22	Grizzlys Wolfsburg	DEL	52	3	9	12	17	8	0	2	2	2
2022–23	Grizzlys Wolfsburg	DEL	26	0	6	6	15	—	—	—	—	—
2023–24	Grizzlys Wolfsburg	DEL	28	1	5	6	4	—	—	—	—	—
2024–25	Grizzlys Wolfsburg	DEL	50	5	3	8	6	—	—	—	—	—
AHL totals			86	3	3	6	65	—	—	—	—	—
DEL totals			461	37	124	161	194	54	0	9	9	56

=== International ===
Year	Team	Event	Result	GP	G	A	Pts	PIM
2008	Canada Pacific	U17	4th	6	1	0	1	2
Junior totals				6	1	0	1	2
