= Pachal, Thiruvannamalai =

Pachal
- village
- Location in Tamil Nadu, India Pachal (India)
- Coordinates: 12°16′0″N 78°56′0″E
- Country: India
- State: Tamil Nadu
- District: Tiruvannamalai
- Elevation: 298 m (978 ft)

Languages
  - Official: Tamil
- Time zone: UTC+5:30 (IST)
- PIN: 606704

Pachal is a village in Tiruvannamalai district, Tamil Nadu, India.

== Geography ==
It is located at an elevation of 298 m from MSL.

== Location ==
National Highway 66 passes through Pachal.
