= Rich Peverley =

Canadian ice hockey player (born 1982)

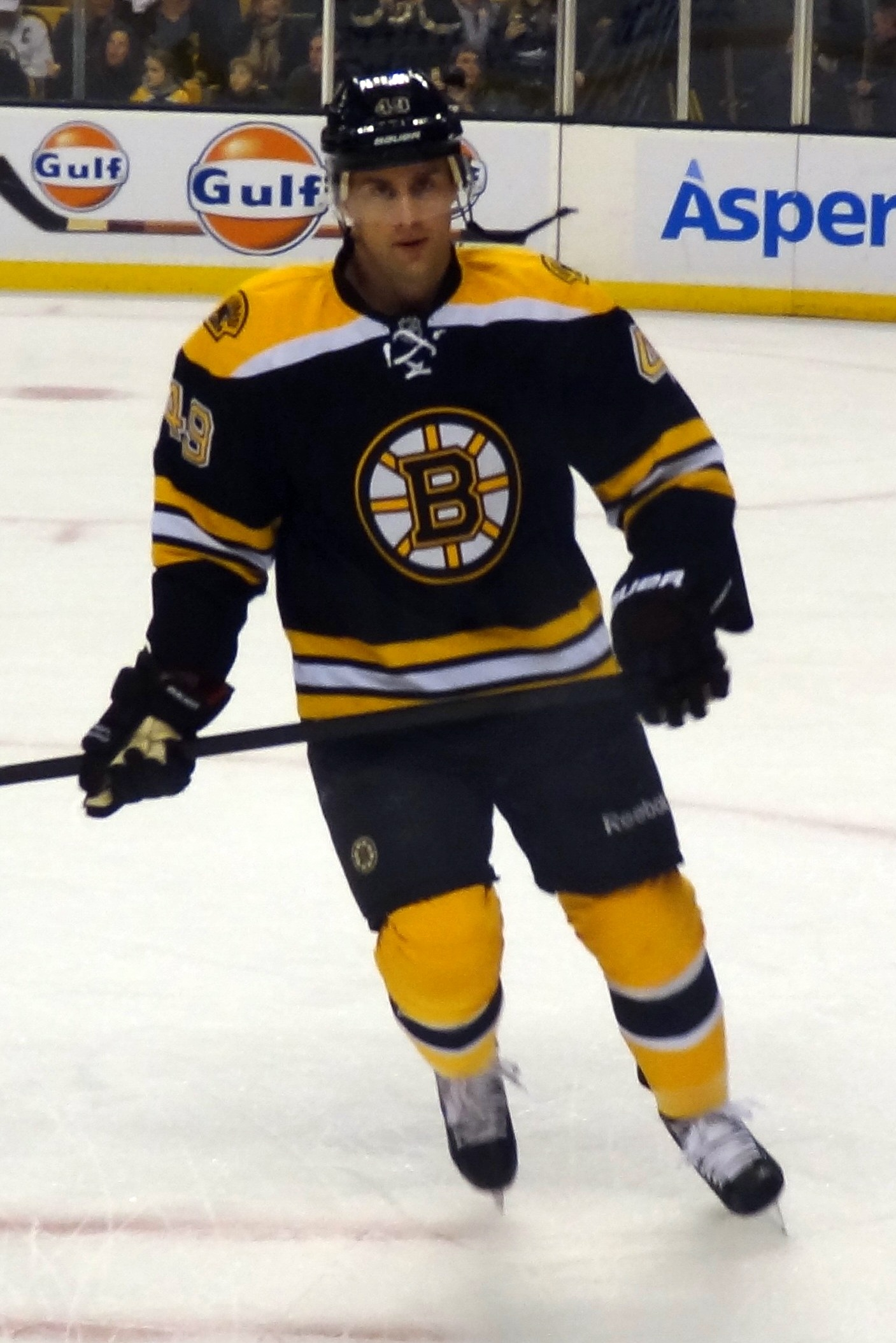
- Peverley with the Boston Bruins in January 2012
- Born: July 8, 1982 (age 44) Kingston, Ontario, Canada
- Height: 5 ft 11 in (180 cm)
- Weight: 195 lb (88 kg; 13 st 13 lb)
- Position: Centre
- Shot: Right
- Played for: Nashville Predators; Atlanta Thrashers; Boston Bruins; JYP Jyväskylä; Dallas Stars
- National team: Canada
- NHL draft: Undrafted
- Playing career: 2004–2014

John Richard Peverley (born July 8, 1982), also known by the nickname "Raptor Jesus", is a Canadian former professional ice hockey player. He spent four years with the St. Lawrence University hockey team before turning professional, then playing three years for several teams in both the ECHL and American Hockey League (AHL). In 2007, he signed a contract with the Nashville Predators of the NHL, playing for the team for parts of three seasons before the Atlanta Thrashers claimed him off waivers in 2009. Peverley first played internationally for Team Canada at the 2010 World Championships. He retired after the 2013–14 season because of a heart ailment.

== Playing career ==
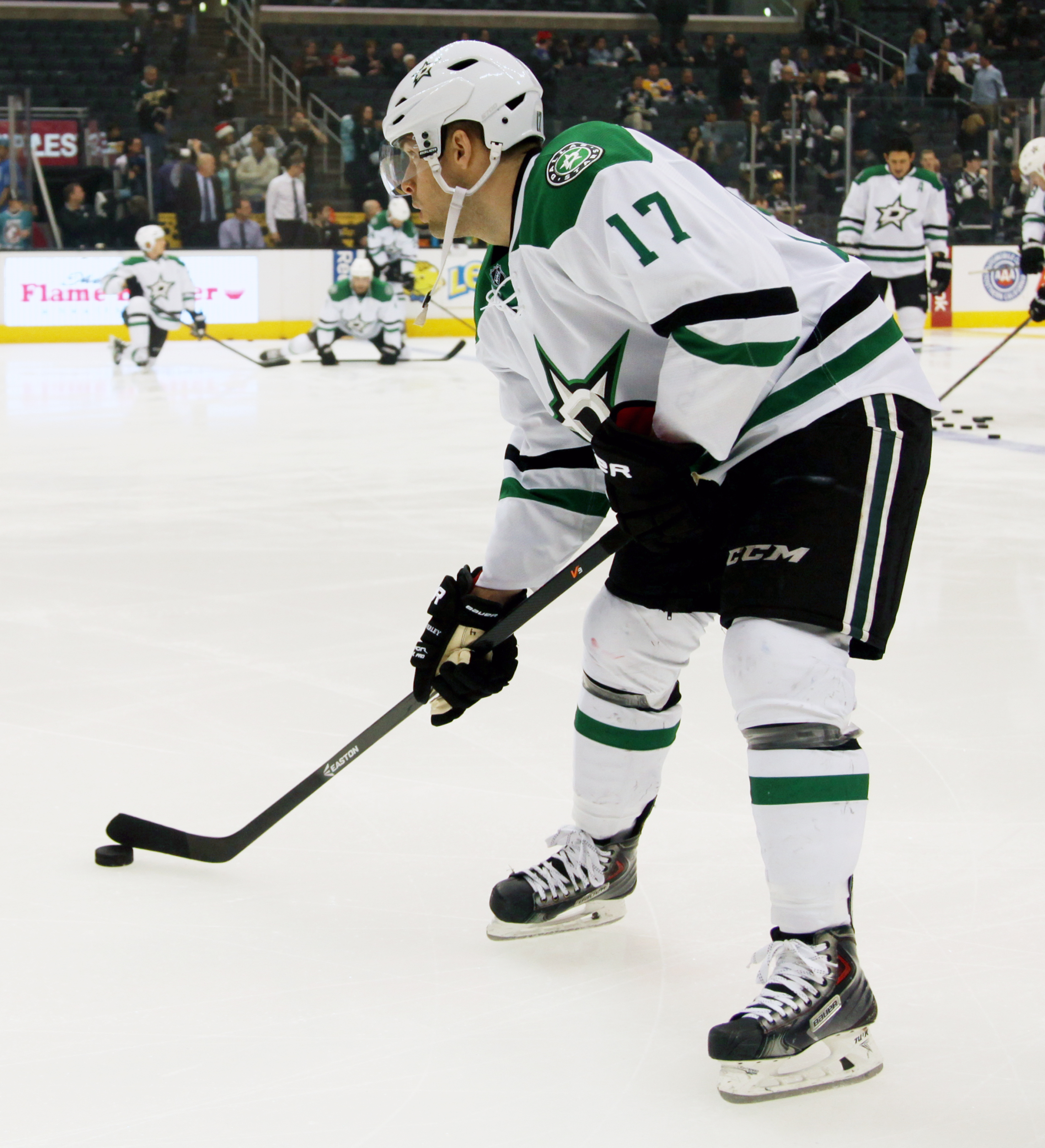
Peverley with the Dallas Stars in December 2013.

Peverley was born in Kingston, Ontario but moved to Guelph, Ontario at age eight, playing most of his minor hockey for the Guelph Reps (now Jr. Storm) of the OMHA South Central AAA League. In his Midget year, he played one season with the Toronto Young Nats of the MTHL before moving back to his home area to play for the Kitchener Dutchmen Jr.B. club of the OHA Midwestern league.

After his Jr.B. season with the Dutchmen, Peverley was selected by Don Cherry and the Mississauga IceDogs in the sixth round, 124th overall, of the 1999 OHL Draft. Peverley chose to maintain his NCAA eligibility, however, and instead signed for the 1999–2000 season with the Milton Merchants of the OHA's Provincial Jr.A. League. He later accepted an NCAA scholarship at the end of the season.

Prior to beginning his professional career, Peverley played collegiate hockey for the St. Lawrence University Skating Saints, where he led the Skating Saints in points in three of his four seasons. Undrafted, Peverley made his professional debut in the 2004–05 season in the ECHL with the South Carolina Stingrays before playing a solitary game with the Portland Pirates in the American Hockey League (AHL).

After leading the Milwaukee Admirals in points midway in the 2006–07 season, his second season with the team, Peverley was signed by the team's parent club, the Nashville Predators, on January 17, 2007, appearing in 13 NHL games by season's end. Peverley split the 2007–08 season with the Predators and the Admirals, appearing in all six games for the Predators in the Stanley Cup playoffs against the eventual Stanley Cup champions, the Detroit Red Wings. Peverly gained the nickname "Raptor Jesus" among fans during the time he played with the Nashville Predators.

On January 10, 2009, Peverley was claimed off waivers by the Atlanta Thrashers after accumulating nine points in 27 games. The switch to Atlanta rejuvenated his career, as he collected 35 points in 39 games for the remainder of the 2008–09 season and earned a two-year, $2.6 million contract with the Thrashers in the process. On February 18, 2011, Peverley was traded by the Thrashers, along with Boris Valábik, to the Boston Bruins in exchange for Blake Wheeler and Mark Stuart. He won the Stanley Cup with the Bruins on June 15, 2011.

As a result of the 2012–13 NHL lock-out, Peverley signed a contract with JYP of the Finnish SM-liiga. On July 4, 2013, Peverley was traded, along with Tyler Seguin and Ryan Button, to the Dallas Stars in exchange for Loui Eriksson, Joe Morrow, Reilly Smith and Matt Fraser.

=== In-game cardiac incident ===
In September 2013, before the start of the Stars' 2013 training camp, Peverley underwent a surgical procedure to help with an irregular heartbeat. Six months later, Peverley collapsed on the team bench during a game against the Columbus Blue Jackets, due to the cardiac issue. Subsequent surgery corrected the irregular heartbeat, and Peverley spent the 2014–15 season as a volunteer assistant coach for the Stars' AHL affiliate, the Texas Stars. He had a defibrillator installed to regulate his heartbeat. After being told it would have to be removed for him to be cleared to play again, Peverley announced his retirement in September 2015 and joined the Stars' player development department.

== International play ==
Peverley made his international debut in 2010, when he was named to the Canadian national team for the 2010 World Championship. He played all seven games for Canada, who finished seventh, and had one goal and three assists; his one goal was scored in a game against Norway.

== Career statistics ==
=== Regular season and playoffs ===
			Regular season					Playoffs
Season	Team	League	GP	G	A	Pts	PIM	GP	G	A	Pts	PIM
1998–99	Kitchener Dutchmen	MWJHL	47	23	20	43	22	—	—	—	—	—
1999–2000	Milton Merchants	OPJHL	45	17	28	45	16	—	—	—	—	—
2000–01	St. Lawrence University	ECAC	29	2	4	6	4	—	—	—	—	—
2001–02	St. Lawrence University	ECAC	34	10	21	31	18	—	—	—	—	—
2002–03	St. Lawrence University	ECAC	34	15	23	38	12	—	—	—	—	—
2003–04	St. Lawrence University	ECAC	41	17	25	42	34	—	—	—	—	—
2004–05	South Carolina Stingrays	ECHL	69	30	28	58	72	4	2	2	4	6
2004–05	Portland Pirates	AHL	1	0	0	0	0	—	—	—	—	—
2005–06	Reading Royals	ECHL	11	4	11	15	4	—	—	—	—	—
2005–06	Milwaukee Admirals	AHL	65	12	34	46	44	21	2	9	11	18
2006–07	Milwaukee Admirals	AHL	66	30	38	68	62	4	1	2	3	8
2006–07	Nashville Predators	NHL	13	0	1	1	0	—	—	—	—	—
2007–08	Milwaukee Admirals	AHL	45	14	40	54	50	3	1	0	1	0
2007–08	Nashville Predators	NHL	33	5	5	10	8	6	0	2	2	0
2008–09	Nashville Predators	NHL	27	2	7	9	15	—	—	—	—	—
2008–09	Atlanta Thrashers	NHL	39	13	22	35	18	—	—	—	—	—
2009–10	Atlanta Thrashers	NHL	82	22	33	55	36	—	—	—	—	—
2010–11	Atlanta Thrashers	NHL	59	14	20	34	35	—	—	—	—	—
2010–11	Boston Bruins	NHL	23	4	3	7	2	25	4	8	12	17
2011–12	Boston Bruins	NHL	57	11	31	42	22	7	3	2	5	4
2012–13	JYP	SM-l	29	9	14	23	47	—	—	—	—	—
2012–13	Boston Bruins	NHL	47	6	12	18	16	21	2	0	2	12
2013–14	Dallas Stars	NHL	62	7	23	30	15	—	—	—	—	—
NHL totals			442	84	157	241	167	59	9	12	21	33

=== International ===
Year	Team	Event	Result	GP	G	A	Pts	PIM
2010	Canada	WC	7th	7	1	3	4	4
Senior totals				7	1	3	4	4
