= Joe Morrow =

Canadian ice hockey player (born 1992)

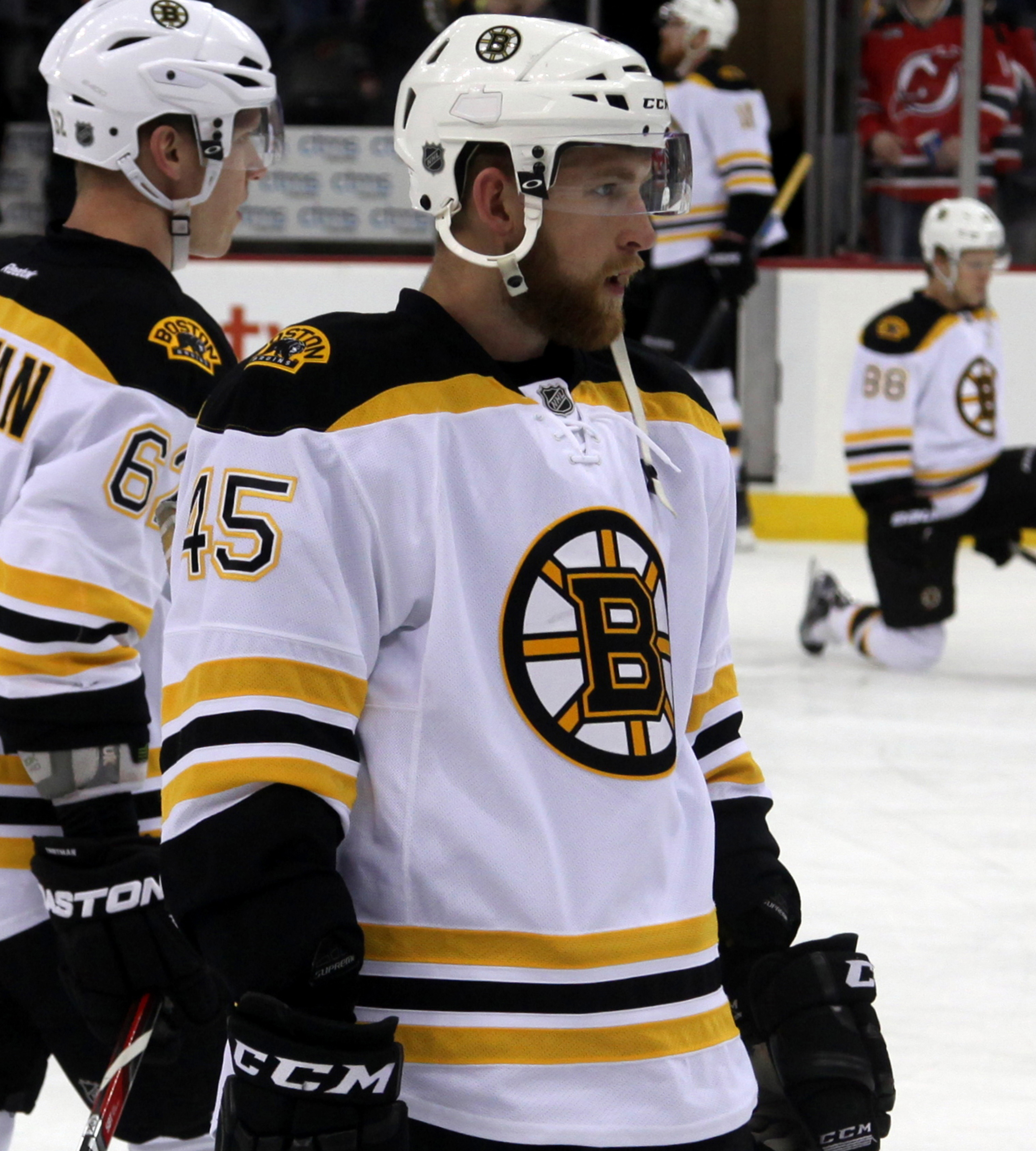
- Morrow with the Boston Bruins in 2016
- Born: December 9, 1992 (age 33) Edmonton, Alberta, Canada
- Height: 6 ft 1 in (185 cm)
- Weight: 198 lb (90 kg; 14 st 2 lb)
- Position: Defence
- Shoots: Left
- EIHL team Former teams: Manchester Storm; Boston Bruins; Montreal Canadiens; Winnipeg Jets; Dinamo Minsk; Ässät; Barys Nur-Sultan; HC Sochi; HC Davos
- NHL draft: 23rd overall, 2011; Pittsburgh Penguins
- Playing career: 2012–present

Joseph Mathew Alexander Morrow (born December 9, 1992) is a Canadian professional ice hockey defenceman for the Unia Oświęcim of the Tauron Hokej Liga (THL). He was selected in the first round, 23rd overall, by the Pittsburgh Penguins of the National Hockey League (NHL) in the 2011 NHL entry draft and has previously played for the Boston Bruins, Montreal Canadiens, and Winnipeg Jets.

== Playing career ==
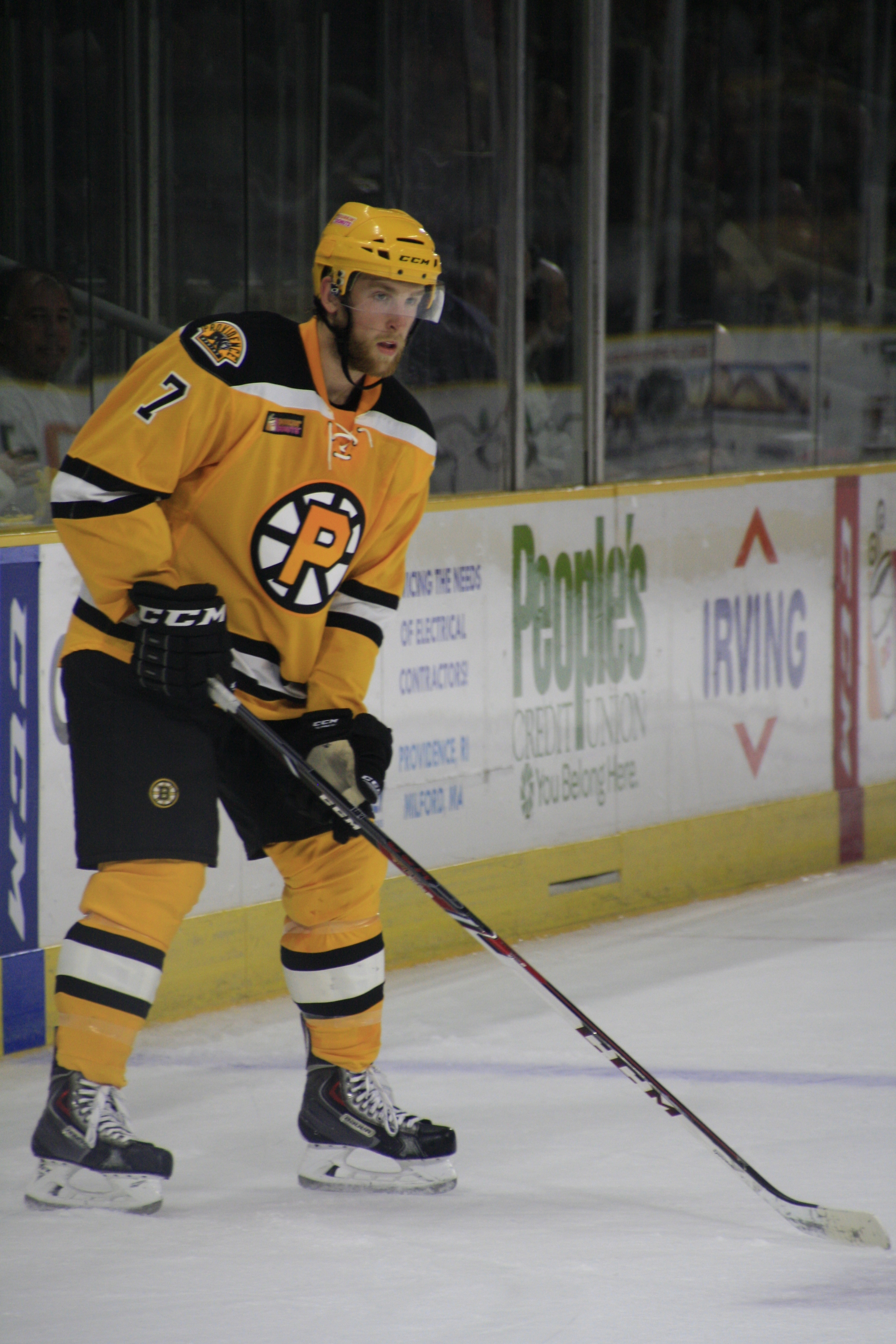
Morrow with the Providence Bruins in October 2014

Morrow played four full seasons of junior hockey in the Western Hockey League with the Portland Winterhawks. After the 2011–12 season, Morrow was named to the WHL's First All-Star Team, and had finished second in league scoring among all defencemen. He was drafted in the first round, 23rd overall, by the Pittsburgh Penguins at the 2011 NHL entry draft. He was then subsequently signed to a three-year entry-level contract with the Penguins on August 3, 2011.

In his first professional season in 2012–13, Morrow was assigned directly to the Penguins American Hockey League affiliate, the Wilkes-Barre/Scranton Penguins, due to the ongoing NHL lock-out. After the commencement of the shortened NHL season, Morrow received his first NHL recall to Pittsburgh but did not debut, as a precautionary injury replacement for Kris Letang, on February 10, 2013.

On March 24, 2013, Morrow was traded from the Penguins along with a fifth-round draft pick in the 2013 NHL entry draft to the Dallas Stars in exchange for Brenden Morrow (no relation) and a third-round draft pick in the same draft. On July 4, 2013, Morrow's tenure with Dallas was cut short as he was again involved in a trade between the Stars and the Boston Bruins. Boston traded Tyler Seguin, Rich Peverley, and Ryan Button; in exchange, they acquired Morrow, Loui Eriksson, Reilly Smith, and Matt Fraser.

He played 33 games during the 2015–16 season and then re-signed with the Bruins to a one-year, one-way deal for $800,000.

On July 1, 2017, Morrow signed as a free agent to a one-year contract with the Montreal Canadiens In the 2017–18 season, Morrow stuck with the Canadiens out of training camp. Despite Montreal dwindling in the standings, Morrow contributed with his best season performance in recording 5 goals and 11 points in 38 games. He was later traded on February 26, 2018, the day of the trade deadline, to the Winnipeg Jets for a fourth-round draft pick in 2018. Morrow scored his first career playoff goal during Game 1 of the 2018 Stanley Cup playoffs in the Jets' first-round series against the Minnesota Wild.

On June 25, 2019, for a second consecutive season Morrow was not tendered a qualifying offer by the Jets, releasing him as a free agent. Having gone unsigned over the summer, Morrow was invited to attend the New York Rangers training camp on a professional tryout basis on September 12, 2019. At the conclusion of camp, Morrow was released by the Rangers on September 24, 2019.

With the 2019–20 season underway, on October 6, 2019, Morrow signed a one-year, two-way deal with the New Jersey Devils. On December 15, Morrow and the Devils mutually terminated the contract. On December 16, Morrow signed a two-year deal with Dinamo Minsk of the Kontinental Hockey League (KHL). In 22 appearances with Minsk, Morrow added just 3 assists, unable to help propel the club into the post-season.

On July 15, 2020, Morrow agreed to a mutual termination of the remaining year of his contract with Dinamo Minsk, releasing him as a free agent. In 2021, Morrow signed a contract with the Finnish Liiga team, Porin Ässät. He returned to the KHL with Barys Nur-Sultan for the 2021–22 season, participating in the playoffs despite the exit of many North American-born players and two of the KHL's non-Russia-based teams due to the 2022 Russian invasion of Ukraine.

As a free agent in the following off-season, Morrow signed a one-year contract to continue in the KHL with HC Sochi on July 7, 2022.

After a spell in Switzerland with HC Davos, Morrow joined UK EIHL side Manchester Storm in September 2023.

== Personal life ==
Morrow was born in Edmonton, Alberta, but grew up in Sherwood Park, Alberta. Morrow comes from an ice hockey family, with his father, Dave, spending time with the Indianapolis Racers of the World Hockey Association (WHA). Dave Morrow was selected by the Vancouver Canucks in the 1977 NHL amateur draft, but never played with the team. In the 2002 NHL entry draft his older brother, Josh, was selected 203rd overall by the Nashville Predators.

== Career statistics ==
			Regular season					Playoffs
Season	Team	League	GP	G	A	Pts	PIM	GP	G	A	Pts	PIM
2007–08	Sherwood Park Kings	AMHL	24	7	11	18	57	—	—	—	—	—
2007–08	Portland Winterhawks	WHL	1	0	0	0	0	—	—	—	—	—
2008–09	Portland Winterhawks	WHL	41	0	7	7	26	—	—	—	—	—
2009–10	Portland Winterhawks	WHL	63	7	24	31	59	13	0	2	2	6
2010–11	Portland Winterhawks	WHL	60	9	40	49	67	21	6	14	20	27
2011–12	Portland Winterhawks	WHL	62	17	47	64	99	22	4	13	17	35
2012–13	Wilkes-Barre/Scranton Penguins	AHL	57	4	11	15	35	—	—	—	—	—
2012–13	Texas Stars	AHL	9	1	3	4	4	8	2	1	3	8
2013–14	Providence Bruins	AHL	56	6	23	29	28	10	2	5	7	8
2014–15	Providence Bruins	AHL	33	3	9	12	14	5	0	0	0	6
2014–15	Boston Bruins	NHL	15	1	0	1	4	—	—	—	—	—
2015–16	Boston Bruins	NHL	33	1	6	7	4	—	—	—	—	—
2016–17	Boston Bruins	NHL	17	0	1	1	8	5	0	1	1	2
2016–17	Providence Bruins	AHL	3	1	0	1	2	—	—	—	—	—
2017–18	Montreal Canadiens	NHL	38	5	6	11	26	—	—	—	—	—
2017–18	Winnipeg Jets	NHL	18	1	4	5	0	6	1	0	1	14
2018–19	Winnipeg Jets	NHL	41	1	6	7	20	—	—	—	—	—
2019–20	Binghamton Devils	AHL	16	1	3	4	16	—	—	—	—	—
2019–20	Dinamo Minsk	KHL	22	0	3	3	23	—	—	—	—	—
2020–21	Ässät	Liiga	29	4	7	11	46	—	—	—	—	—
2021–22	Barys Nur-Sultan	KHL	29	3	10	13	14	5	0	4	4	0
2022–23	HC Sochi	KHL	31	0	9	9	10	—	—	—	—	—
2022–23	HC Davos	NL	2	0	0	0	2	1	0	0	2	0
2023–24	Manchester Storm	EIHL	50	9	18	27	32	2	0	0	0	0
NHL totals			162	9	23	32	62	11	1	1	2	16
KHL totals			82	3	22	25	47	5	0	4	4	0

Awards and achievements
Preceded by Beau Bennett	Pittsburgh Penguins first-round draft pick 2011	Succeeded by Derrick Pouliot
