= Vern Pachal =

Canadian ice hockey player

- Born: November 4, 1930 (age 95) Yorkton, Saskatchewan, Canada
- Height: 5 ft 11 in (180 cm)
- Weight: 165 lb (75 kg; 11 st 11 lb)
- Position: Center
- Shot: Right
- Played for: Univ. of Alberta; Springfield Indians; Syracuse Warriors
- Playing career: 1951–1955

Vernon Jack Pachal (born November 4, 1930) is a Canadian former ice hockey player. He played from 1956 to 1958 at the University of Alberta, where he set a points record for the Canada West University Athletics Association. He then played in the Eastern Hockey League, American Hockey League, Quebec Hockey League, and Saskatchewan Senior Hockey League before his retirement in the 1960s. He also played in the Western Canada Junior Hockey League prior to attending the University of Alberta. He is a member of the University of Alberta's Sports Wall of Fame (inducted 1999) and Saskatchewan Sports Hall of Fame (inducted 2013).
