= Matt Fraser =

Canadian ice hockey player (born 1990)

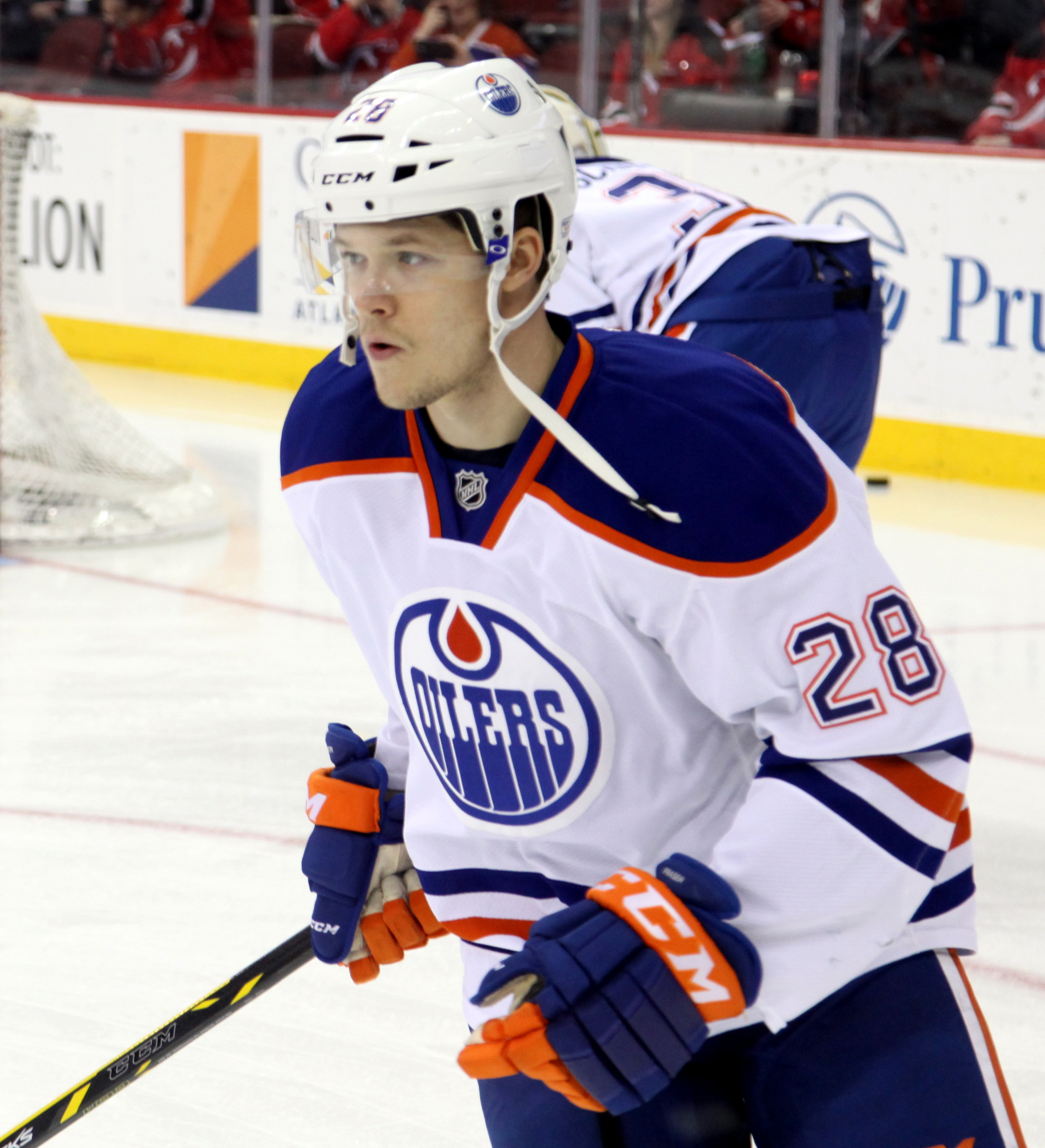
- Fraser with the Edmonton Oilers in 2015
- Born: May 20, 1990 (age 36) Red Deer, Alberta, Canada
- Height: 6 ft 2 in (188 cm)
- Weight: 207 lb (94 kg; 14 st 11 lb)
- Position: Left wing
- Shoots: Left
- ICEHL team Former teams: EC KAC; Dallas Stars; Boston Bruins; Edmonton Oilers; Rögle BK; Dornbirner EC; Augsburger Panther
- NHL draft: Undrafted
- Playing career: 2010–present

Matthew John Fraser (born May 20, 1990) is a Canadian professional ice hockey left wing. He is currently under contract with EC KAC of the ICE Hockey League (ICEHL). He has previously played in the National Hockey League for the Dallas Stars, Boston Bruins and Edmonton Oilers.

== Playing career ==
Fraser played major junior hockey in the Western Hockey League (WHL), winning the 2010–11 WHL championship with the Kootenay Ice.

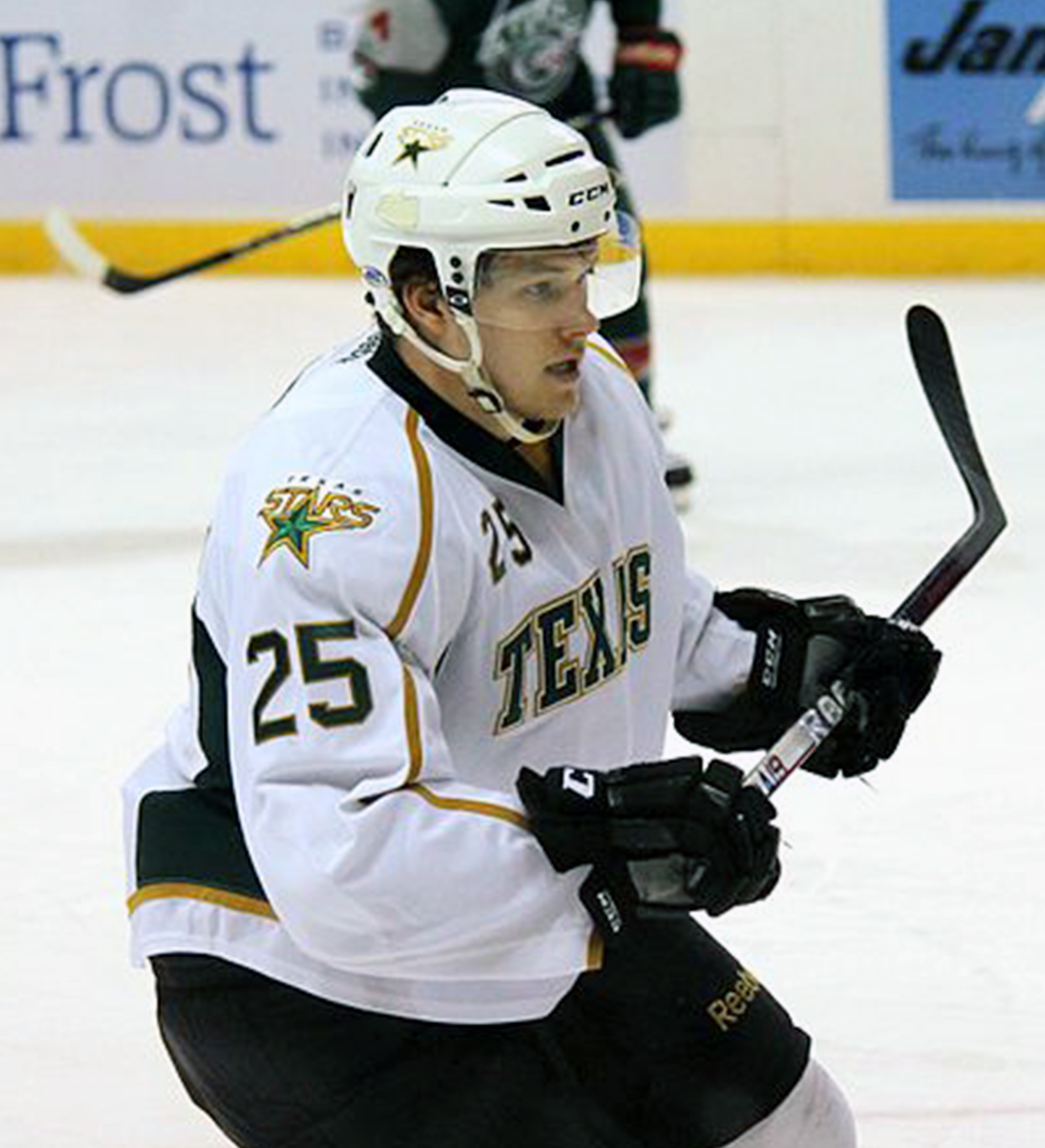
Fraser with the Texas Stars in 2013

On November 17, 2010, the Dallas Stars signed Fraser as a free agent to a three-year entry-level contract. Fraser started the 2011–12 season playing with the Stars' top American Hockey League affiliate, the Texas Stars, where he scored 21 goals in his first 40 games. Fraser was leading his AHL team in scoring when, on January 24, 2012, he was called up to the Dallas Stars to make his NHL debut. After one game he was returned to Texas and finished with a franchise high 37 goals, second in the league. On February 25, 2013, he scored his first career NHL goal against the Nashville Predators with Pekka Rinne in net.

On July 4, 2013, Fraser was included in a trade between the Stars and Boston Bruins which sent Loui Eriksson to Boston and Tyler Seguin to Dallas in a seven-player deal. Boston traded Seguin, Rich Peverley and Ryan Button to Dallas for Eriksson, Fraser, Joe Morrow and Reilly Smith. Fraser and Ryan Spooner were called up by the Boston Bruins from AHL Providence on December 8, 2013. On May 7, 2014, Fraser was recalled by Boston to make his NHL playoff debut the following day where he scored the overtime winner, giving the Bruins a 1–0 win over the Montreal Canadiens on May 8 to even the Eastern Conference Semifinals series 2-2.

In the 2014–15 season, Fraser was claimed off waivers from the Bruins by the Edmonton Oilers on December 29, 2014. Fraser scored 5 goals in 36 games to end the year with the Oilers; however, he was not retained with a qualifying offer, releasing him to unrestricted free agency. On July 2, 2015, Fraser signed as a free agent to a one-year, two-way contract with the Winnipeg Jets.

In the 2015–16 season, while with the Jets AHL affiliate, the Manitoba Moose, on February 25, 2016, Fraser was traded by Winnipeg alongside Andrew Ladd and Jay Harrison to the Chicago Blackhawks in exchange for Marko Daňo and a first-round pick in the 2016 NHL entry draft.

Unable to crack an NHL roster in a full-time role over five seasons, Fraser left North America as a free agent, signing a one-year deal with Swedish club Rögle BK of the Swedish Hockey League on September 9, 2016. After one season in Rögle, Fraser moved to Austria to compete with Dornbirner EC of the EBEL.

On April 11, 2018, Fraser moved to the neighbouring German DEL league, agreeing to a one-year contract for the 2018–19 season with the Augsburger Panther.

== Career statistics ==
			Regular season					Playoffs
Season	Team	League	GP	G	A	Pts	PIM	GP	G	A	Pts	PIM
2006–07	Red Deer Rebels	WHL	3	0	0	0	2	1	0	0	0	0
2007–08	Red Deer Rebels	WHL	5	0	0	0	2	—	—	—	—	—
2007–08	Kootenay Ice	WHL	63	9	11	20	48	8	1	1	2	0
2008–09	Kootenay Ice	WHL	63	10	14	24	123	4	0	2	2	12
2009–10	Kootenay Ice	WHL	65	32	24	56	117	6	1	1	2	12
2009–10	Peoria Rivermen	AHL	2	0	0	0	0	—	—	—	—	—
2010–11	Kootenay Ice	WHL	66	36	38	74	115	19	17	10	27	18
2011–12	Texas Stars	AHL	73	37	18	55	45	—	—	—	—	—
2011–12	Dallas Stars	NHL	1	0	0	0	0	—	—	—	—	—
2012–13	Texas Stars	AHL	62	33	13	46	26	9	2	0	2	2
2012–13	Dallas Stars	NHL	12	1	2	3	0	—	—	—	—	—
2013–14	Providence Bruins	AHL	40	20	10	30	34	5	3	2	5	0
2013–14	Boston Bruins	NHL	14	2	0	2	10	4	1	1	2	0
2014–15	Boston Bruins	NHL	24	3	0	3	7	—	—	—	—	—
2014–15	Edmonton Oilers	NHL	36	5	4	9	10	—	—	—	—	—
2015–16	Manitoba Moose	AHL	44	5	9	14	4	—	—	—	—	—
2015–16	Rockford IceHogs	AHL	21	2	5	7	10	2	0	1	1	2
2016–17	Rögle BK	SHL	4	0	0	0	0	—	—	—	—	—
2017–18	Dornbirner EC	EBEL	51	27	18	45	30	6	1	1	2	2
2018–19	Augsburger Panther	DEL	52	18	16	34	36	14	3	3	6	12
2019–20	Augsburger Panther	DEL	52	9	15	24	18	—	—	—	—	—
2020–21	EC KAC	ICEHL	26	10	11	21	12	15	10	5	15	10
2021–22	EC KAC	ICEHL	45	16	8	24	12	9	5	5	10	10
2022–23	EC KAC	ICEHL	46	14	10	24	12	4	1	1	2	2
NHL totals			87	11	6	17	27	4	1	1	2	0

== Awards and honors ==
Award	Year
WHL
Doug Wickenheiser Memorial Trophy – Humanitarian of the Year	2009–10
Champion (Kootenay Ice)	2010–11
