= Loui Eriksson =

Swedish ice hockey player (born 1985)

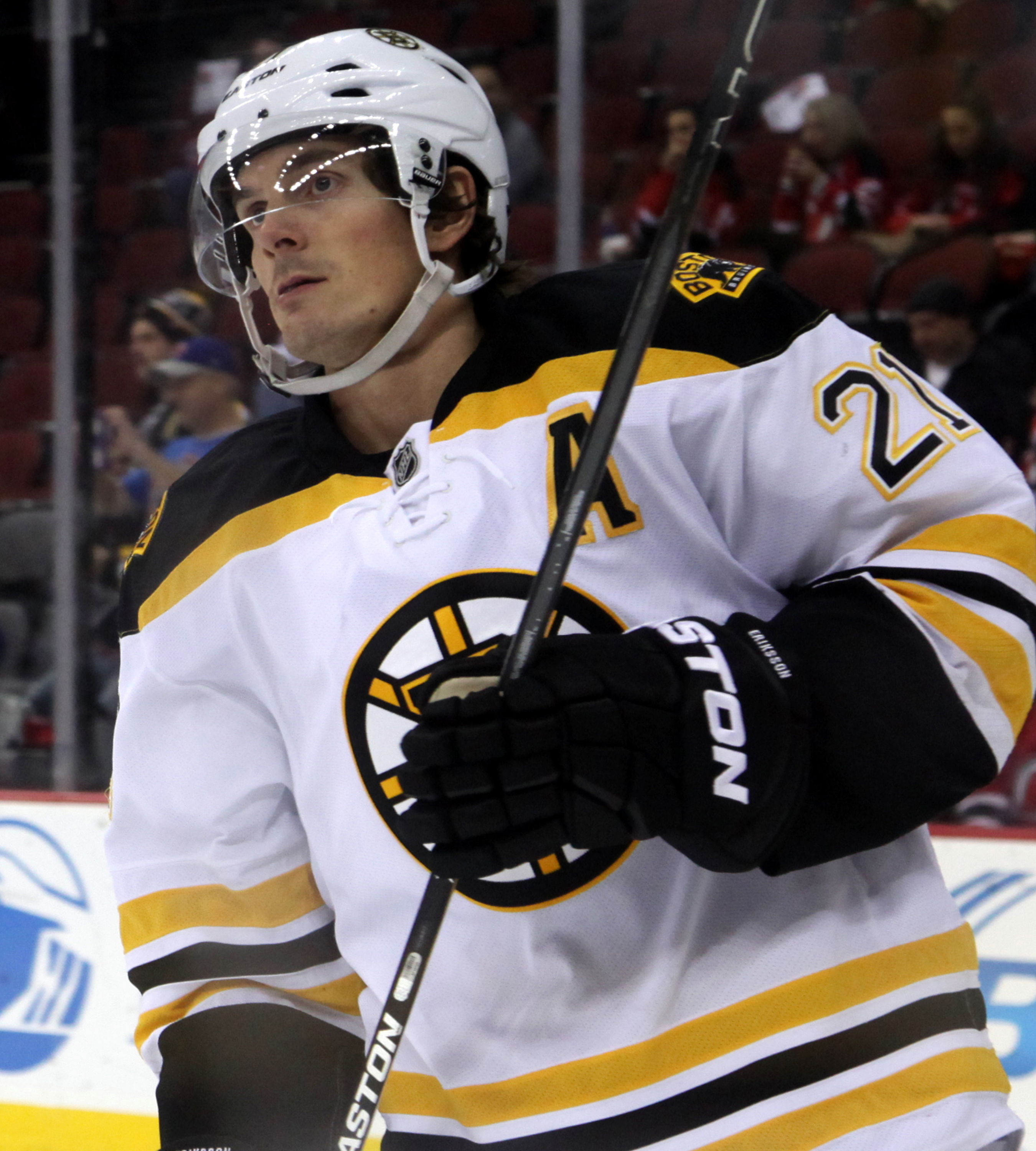
- Eriksson with the Boston Bruins in 2016
- Born: 17 July 1985 (age 41) Gothenburg, Sweden
- Height: 6 ft 2 in (188 cm)
- Weight: 179 lb (81 kg; 12 st 11 lb)
- Position: Right wing
- Shot: Left
- Played for: Frölunda HC; Dallas Stars; HC Davos; Boston Bruins; Vancouver Canucks; Arizona Coyotes
- National team: Sweden
- NHL draft: 33rd overall, 2003; Dallas Stars
- Playing career: 2003–2023

Loui William Eriksson (born 17 July 1985) is a Swedish former professional ice hockey forward.

Eriksson was selected by the Dallas Stars in the second round, 33rd overall, at the 2003 NHL entry draft, and has also played for the Boston Bruins, Vancouver Canucks, and Arizona Coyotes of the National Hockey League (NHL).

== Playing career ==
Eriksson started playing for Lerums BK at a young age and excelled beyond others his age quickly. By age 11, he was already playing with the older under-16 team. His talent was recognized by coach Joshua Clemas, at various tournaments, and he finally landed on the junior team for Frölunda HC.

Eriksson's professional career began in the top-tier Elitserien, where he played for Frölunda, sometimes facing his future fellow Boston Bruins forward Carl Söderberg when playing against the Malmö Redhawks during his first two seasons with Frölunda. Eriksson won Rookie of the Year honours in 2004 at the age of 18 after posting eight goals and five assists in 46 games. A year later, Eriksson would post five goals and nine assists in 39 games, helping Frölunda win the Swedish ice hockey championship (SM-guld).

=== Dallas Stars (2006–2013) ===
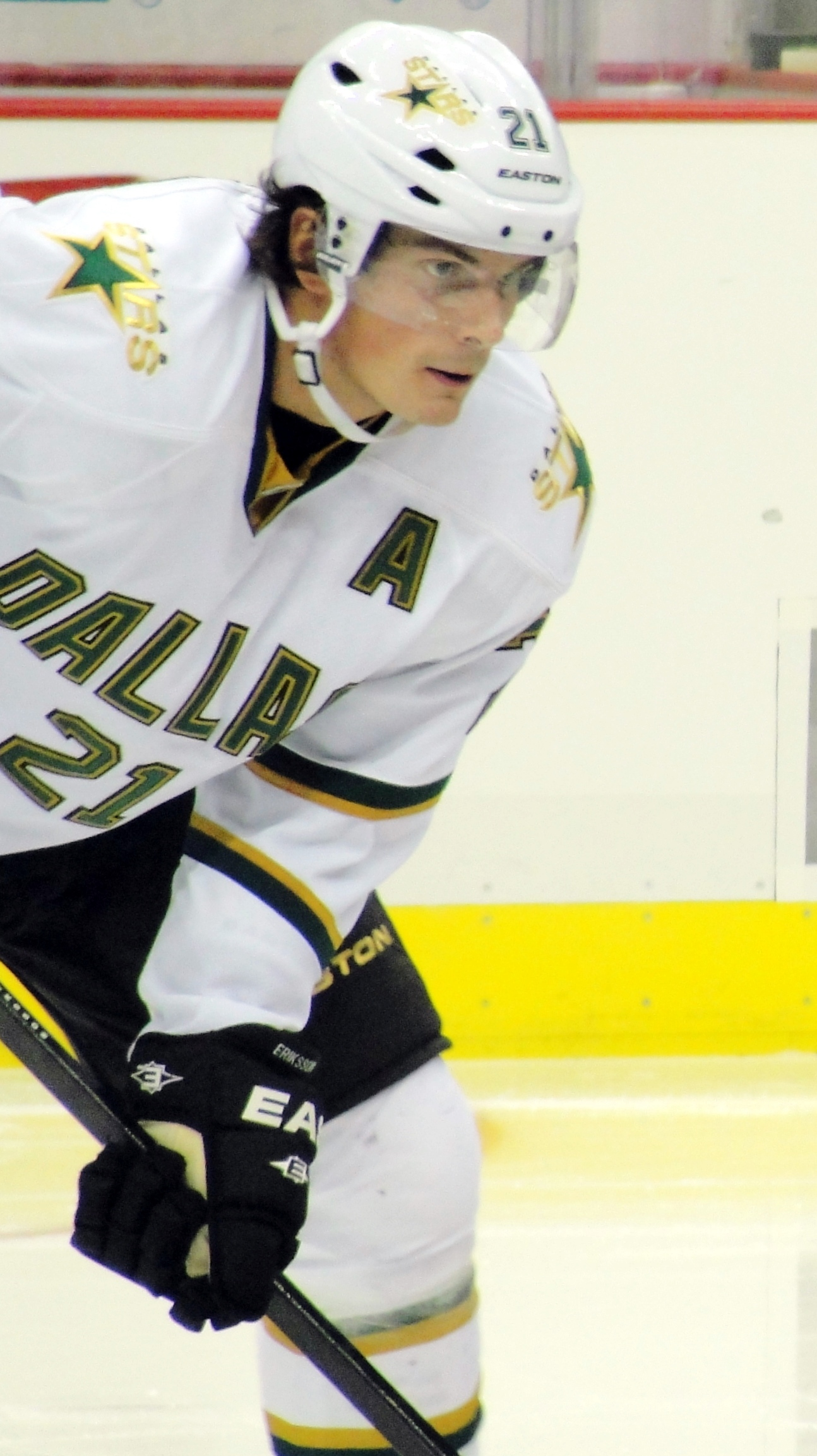
Eriksson with the Dallas Stars in November 2011

In the 2003 NHL entry draft, the Dallas Stars drafted Eriksson in the second round with the 33rd overall pick. After playing in his second season with Frölunda, Eriksson moved to North America and appeared in two pre-season games for Dallas in 2005. His professional debut in North America came on 6 October 2005, with the Stars' American Hockey League (AHL) affiliate, the Iowa Stars, in a game where Eriksson posted his first assist and point of the season.

Eriksson's first NHL goal came in his debut, 4 October 2006, against the Colorado Avalanche.

Two years later, he had a break-out season in 2008–09, where he led the Stars with 36 goals, placing him fifth in the West and 12th overall in goal-scoring. He was one of only three Stars to play in all 82 games of the season.

Prior to the following season, on 2 October 2009, he was recognized as a significant offensive force of the Stars attack by re-signing to a six-year contract extension worth $25.5 million.

Eriksson participated in his first NHL All-Star Game in 2011. He had a goal and two assists as well as the eventual game-winning empty-net goal to lead all players with four points (matched only by Shea Weber with four assists). Eriksson finished the 2010–11 season with 73 points (27 goals and 46 assists) in 79 games and was named a finalist for the Lady Byng Memorial Trophy for most gentlemanly play for the first time in his career, which ultimately went to Tampa Bay Lightning forward Martin St. Louis.

=== Boston Bruins (2013–2016) ===
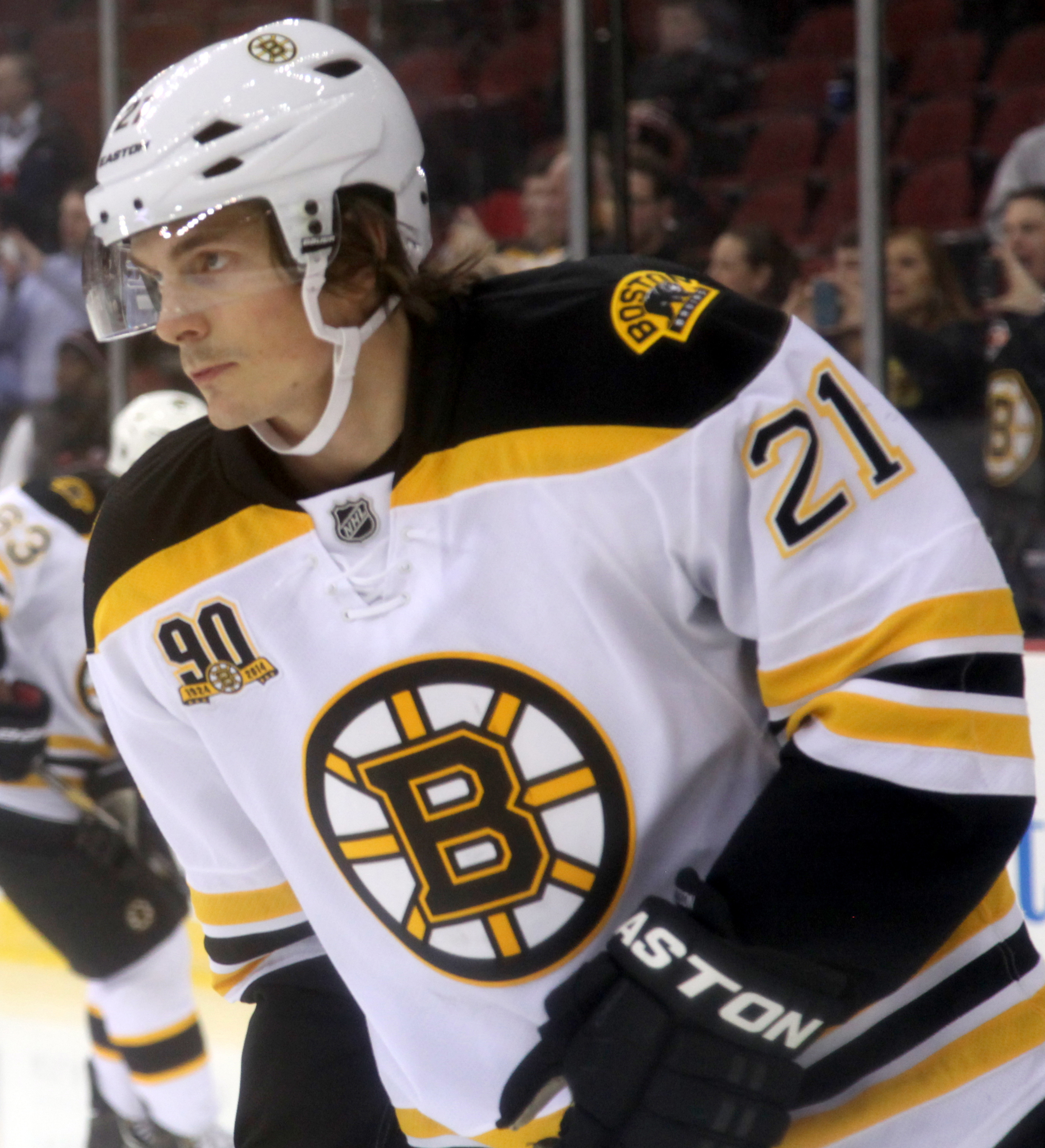
Eriksson with the Boston Bruins in March 2014

On 4 July 2013, Eriksson, along with prospects Joseph Morrow, Reilly Smith and Matt Fraser, was traded by the Stars to the Boston Bruins in exchange for Tyler Seguin, Rich Peverley and Ryan Button. In an injury-marred first season in Boston, after two concussions on separate hits from John Scott of the Buffalo Sabres and Brooks Orpik of the Pittsburgh Penguins, Eriksson would finish the 2013–14 season with 10 goals and 27 assists for 37 points in 61 games, finding chemistry with centre and fellow Swede Carl Söderberg.

On 13 February 2016, Eriksson scored his 200th NHL goal, as the third Bruins goal going towards a 4–2 road win against the Minnesota Wild. He finished the 2015–16 season with 30 goals and 33 assists for 63 points in all 82 games. He was named a finalist for the Lady Byng Memorial Trophy for the second time in his career, which ultimately went to Los Angeles Kings forward Anze Kopitar.

=== Vancouver Canucks (2016–2021) ===
On 1 July 2016, Eriksson signed a six-year, $36 million deal with the Vancouver Canucks. Eriksson previously had success with Henrik and Daniel Sedin in international tournaments. He made his Canucks debut on 15 October 2016, against the Calgary Flames where he scored an own goal. With the Vancouver net empty due to a delayed penalty by the Flames and facing pressure from attacking players, Eriksson attempted to dump the puck into his own zone, however, a miscalculation in the heat of the moment lead to the puck entering the Canuck's net. Nevertheless, Vancouver would win 2–1 in the shootout, with Eriksson earning an assist on the game-tying goal by Daniel Sedin. On 5 March 2017 Eriksson suffered a season-ending knee injury after a collision with Anaheim Ducks forward Chris Wagner. Eriksson ended a disappointing first season with the Canucks with 11 goals and 13 assists in 65 games.

Eriksson would have another dismal and injury plagued season with the Canucks in 2017-18 finishing with 23 points in 50 games.

During the 2018-19 NHL season, Eriksson was able to stay healthy, but only scored 29 points in 81 games.

On 10 February 2021, Eriksson was placed on waivers.

=== Arizona Coyotes (2021–2022) ===
On 23 July 2021, Eriksson was traded, along with Jay Beagle, Antoine Roussel, a 2021 first-round pick, a 2022 second-round pick and a 2023 seventh-round pick, to the Arizona Coyotes in exchange for Oliver Ekman-Larsson and Conor Garland.

On 6 December 2021, Eriksson played his 1000th NHL game in a 4-1 loss over his former team, the Dallas Stars.

=== Return to Frölunda and retirement ===
Eriksson and the Pittsburgh Penguins attempted to reach a deal in late August 2023, however it eventually fell through. After going unsigned through by any other NHL team, Eriksson re-signed with Frölunda on 10 November 2022, marking his return to the SHL after 17 years in North America.

On February 10, 2025, Eriksson announced his retirement from professional hockey after 22 years, via a statement on Instagram.

== Career statistics ==
=== Regular season and playoffs ===
			Regular season					Playoffs
Season	Team	League	GP	G	A	Pts	PIM	GP	G	A	Pts	PIM
2000–01	Västra Frölunda HC	J18 Allsv	9	5	3	8	4	—	—	—	—	—
2000–01	Västra Frölunda HC	J20	1	0	0	0	0	—	—	—	—	—
2001–02	Västra Frölunda HC	J18 Allsv	1	1	0	1	0	3	2	1	3	0
2001–02	Västra Frölunda HC	J20	35	7	15	22	2	5	0	2	2	2
2002–03	Västra Frölunda HC	J20	30	16	15	31	10	6	5	3	8	2
2002–03	Västra Frölunda HC	J18 Allsv	—	—	—	—	—	2	1	1	2	2
2003–04	Västra Frölunda HC	SEL	46	8	5	13	4	10	1	5	6	0
2004–05	Frölunda HC	SEL	39	5	9	14	4	12	0	0	0	0
2005–06	Iowa Stars	AHL	78	31	29	60	27	7	2	5	7	0
2006–07	Iowa Stars	AHL	15	5	3	8	13	9	2	5	7	0
2006–07	Dallas Stars	NHL	59	6	13	19	18	4	0	1	1	0
2007–08	Dallas Stars	NHL	69	14	17	31	28	18	4	4	8	8
2007–08	Iowa Stars	AHL	2	1	2	3	2	—	—	—	—	—
2008–09	Dallas Stars	NHL	82	36	27	63	14	—	—	—	—	—
2009–10	Dallas Stars	NHL	82	29	42	71	26	—	—	—	—	—
2010–11	Dallas Stars	NHL	79	27	46	73	8	—	—	—	—	—
2011–12	Dallas Stars	NHL	82	26	45	71	12	—	—	—	—	—
2012–13	HC Davos	NLA	7	3	3	6	0	—	—	—	—	—
2012–13	Dallas Stars	NHL	48	12	17	29	8	—	—	—	—	—
2013–14	Boston Bruins	NHL	61	10	27	37	6	12	2	3	5	4
2014–15	Boston Bruins	NHL	81	22	25	47	14	—	—	—	—	—
2015–16	Boston Bruins	NHL	82	30	33	63	12	—	—	—	—	—
2016–17	Vancouver Canucks	NHL	65	11	13	24	8	—	—	—	—	—
2017–18	Vancouver Canucks	NHL	50	10	13	23	4	—	—	—	—	—
2018–19	Vancouver Canucks	NHL	81	11	18	29	22	—	—	—	—	—
2019–20	Vancouver Canucks	NHL	49	6	7	13	12	10	0	0	0	6
2020–21	Vancouver Canucks	NHL	7	0	1	1	2	—	—	—	—	—
2021–22	Arizona Coyotes	NHL	73	3	16	19	6	—	—	—	—	—
2022–23	Frölunda HC	SHL	34	11	8	19	10	13	4	3	7	2
SHL totals			119	24	22	46	18	35	5	8	13	2
NHL totals			1,050	253	360	613	200	44	6	8	14	18

Medal record

Representing Sweden

Ice hockey

Olympic Games
Silver medal – second place	2014 Sochi	

World Championships
Gold medal – first place	2013 Sweden/Finland	
Silver medal – second place	2011 Slovakia	
Bronze medal – third place	2009 Switzerland	

=== International ===
Year	Team	Event	Result	GP	G	A	Pts	PIM
2003	Sweden	U18	5th	6	5	2	7	12
2004	Sweden	WJC	7th	6	1	1	2	2
2005	Sweden	WJC	6th	6	2	3	5	0
2009	Sweden	WC	3rd place, bronze medalist(s)	9	3	4	7	0
2010	Sweden	OG	5th	4	3	1	4	0
2011	Sweden	WC	2nd place, silver medalist(s)	9	3	1	4	2
2012	Sweden	WC	6th	8	5	8	13	2
2013	Sweden	WC	1st place, gold medalist(s)	10	5	5	10	0
2014	Sweden	OG	2nd place, silver medalist(s)	6	2	1	3	0
2015	Sweden	WC	5th	8	4	6	10	0
2016	Sweden	WCH	3rd	4	1	0	1	0
2019	Sweden	WC	5th	8	1	3	4	0
Junior totals				18	8	6	14	14
Senior totals				66	27	29	56	4

== Achievements ==
- Won SHL Rookie of the Year in 2003–04
- Won SHL league championship in 2005
- RBK AHL Rookie of the Month for March 2006
- Voted the Iowa Stars' Rookie of the Year for the 2005–06 season
- 2011 NHL All-Star Game
- 2012-2013, 2015–2016, Lady Byng Trophy Finalist
