= Reilly Smith =

Canadian ice hockey player (born 1991)

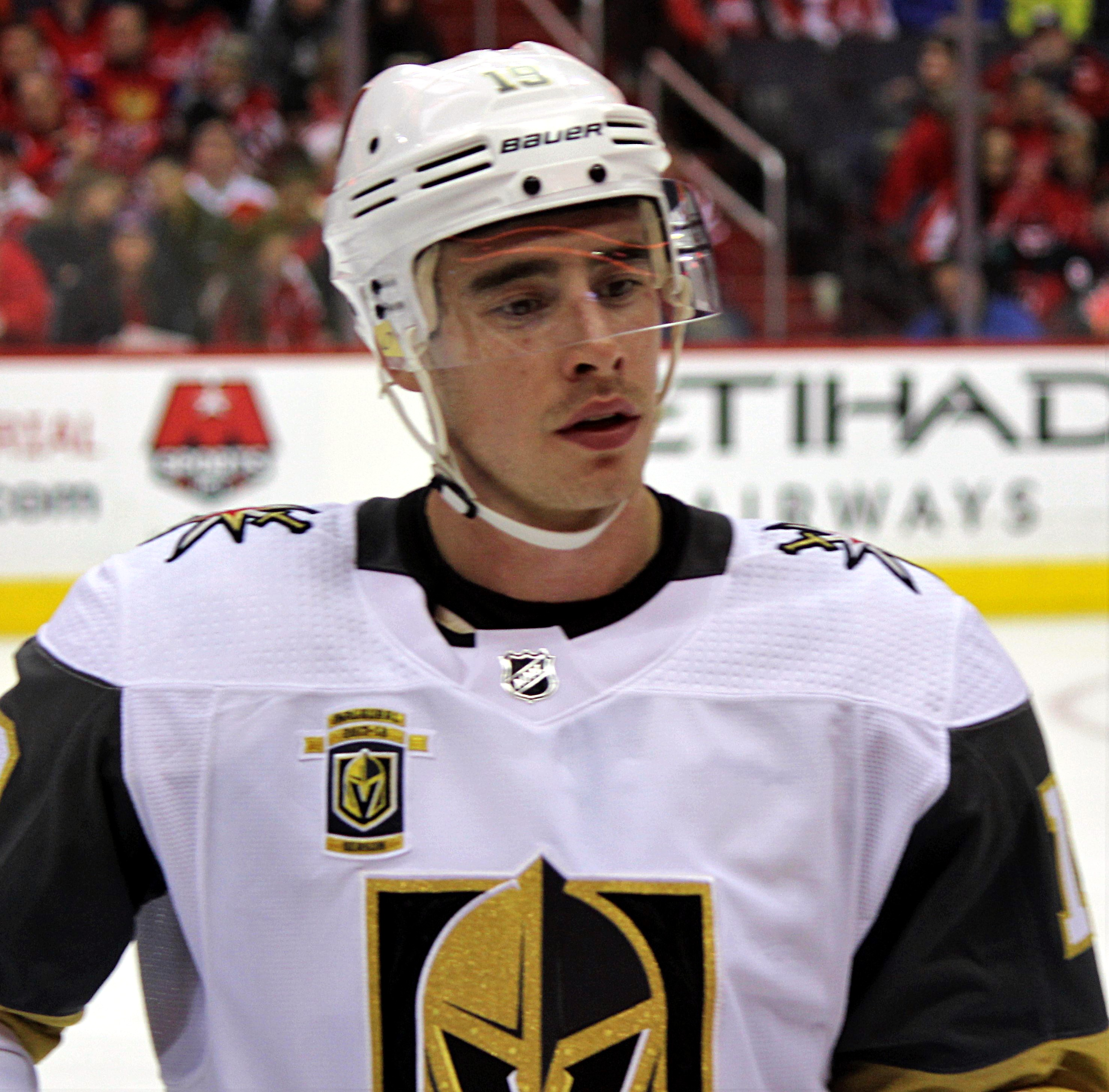
- Smith with the Golden Knights in 2018
- Born: April 1, 1991 (age 35) Etobicoke, Ontario, Canada
- Height: 6 ft 0 in (183 cm)
- Weight: 185 lb (84 kg; 13 st 3 lb)
- Position: Right wing
- Shoots: Left
- NHL team Former teams: Free agent Dallas Stars; Boston Bruins; Florida Panthers; Vegas Golden Knights; Pittsburgh Penguins; New York Rangers
- NHL draft: 69th overall, 2009; Dallas Stars
- Playing career: 2011–present

Reilly Smith (born April 1, 1991) is a Canadian professional ice hockey player who is a right winger and is currently an unrestricted free agent.

Growing up in Toronto, Smith played junior hockey with St. Michael's College School before playing three seasons of NCAA Division I collegiate hockey with the Miami University's RedHawks in the Central Collegiate Hockey Association (CCHA). During his time in college, Smith was drafted in the third round, 69th overall, by the Dallas Stars in the 2009 NHL entry draft. Upon joining the Stars in 2012, he played one full season with the team before being included in a blockbuster trade between Dallas and the Boston Bruins, which sent him, Loui Eriksson, Joe Morrow and Matt Fraser to Boston in exchange for Tyler Seguin, Rich Peverley and Ryan Button. After a short time in Boston, Smith joined the Florida Panthers for two seasons before landing with the Vegas Golden Knights. While with the Knights, he won the Stanley Cup in 2023, scoring the Cup-clinching goal in game five. After stints with the Pittsburgh Penguins and New York Rangers following Vegas' Cup win, Smith was traded back to Vegas in 2025.

Smith was born into an athletic family; he is the younger brother of current Columbus Blue Jackets defenceman Brendan Smith and professional lacrosse player Rory Smith.

== Early life ==
Smith was born on April 1, 1991, in Etobicoke, Ontario, Canada to parents Lester and Deirdre Smith. Smith was born into an athletic family. His older brother Brendan Smith played for multiple teams in the NHL while his brother Rory competed in the National Lacrosse League (NLL). The three all played minor hockey in the Etobicoke neighbourhood of Mimico with the Faustina Sports Club, then all played for the St. Michael's Buzzers minor juniors.

== Playing career ==
=== Amateur ===
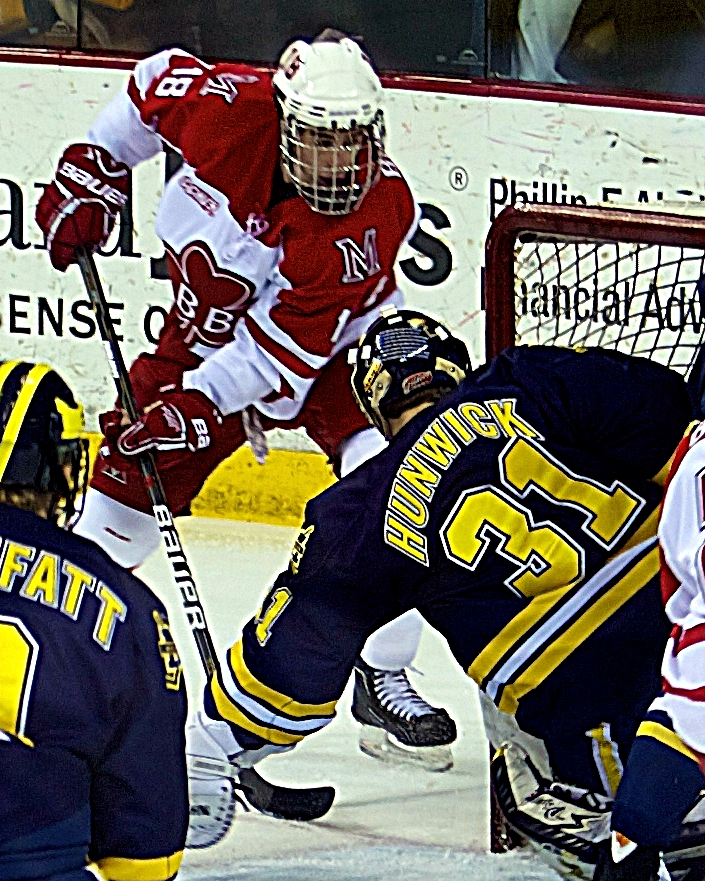
Smith (left) with the RedHawks, February 2011

Growing up, Smith played junior hockey with the Toronto Nationals U16 AAA and St. Michael's College School in Toronto, Ontario. While with St. Michael's, he participated in the CJHL All-Star Game and served as both captain and assistant captain during his career. In his final season with the team, Smith was named their Most Valuable Player after recording 75 points. Prior to entering his freshman season with the Miami University's RedHawks, Smith won a bronze medal at the 2008 World Junior A Challenge and was drafted in the third round, 69th overall, by the Dallas Stars in the 2009 NHL entry draft.

Following the draft, Smith began his freshman season with the Redhawks in the Central Collegiate Hockey Association (CCHA) while majoring in sport studies. Although he admitted to being shocked at the speed of collegiate hockey, Smith recorded eight goals and 20 points in 43 games. During the season, he was also selected to take part in Canada's National Junior Team selection camp.

Upon returning to the RedHawks for his sophomore season, Smith experienced a breakout year and recorded 54 points in 38 games. While playing alongside played alongside seniors Carter Camper and Andy Miele, Smith led the nation's underclassmen in goals and points while also ranking seventh overall in the country for points. As a result of his success during his sophomore year, Smith was named to the All-Florida College Classic Team, voted first team all-CCHA, named to the CCHA all-Tournament Team, College Hockey News Second-Team All-America, and INCH Third-Team All-America.

Smith returned to the RedHawks for his junior year, where he recorded a career-high 30 goals in 39 games. As a result of his success, Smith was named a Hobey Baker Award finalist, First-Team All-America, and finalist for the RBC Financial Group CCHA Player of the Year.

=== Professional ===
==== Dallas Stars (2011–2013) ====
On March 25, 2012, Smith relinquished his final year at Miami to sign a three-year, entry-level contract with the Dallas Stars. He made his NHL debut on March 28, 2012, against the Edmonton Oilers and skated for five shifts. Smith played 4:05 minutes of ice time and recorded one shot on goal in the 3–1 loss. He played two more games with the Stars before they concluded their regular season.

After attending the Stars' 2012 training camp, Smith was reassigned to their American Hockey League (AHL) affiliate, the Texas Stars. During his first 11 games in the AHL, he had recorded three assists. He was promoted to Dallas for the season once play resumed in January 2013 and scored his first career NHL goal on February 15, 2013, against Cory Schneider of the Vancouver Canucks. His second goal came a few days later in a 4–3 loss to the Calgary Flames. As a result of his early success, Smith was promoted to a top six position in February and played left wing on a line with Derek Roy and Loui Eriksson. After playing in 28 games for Dallas, and recording six points, he was reassigned to the AHL alongside defenseman Joe Morrow. He was recalled shortly thereafter after recording one goal and one assist during a game against the Houston Aeros.

==== Boston Bruins (2013–2015) ====
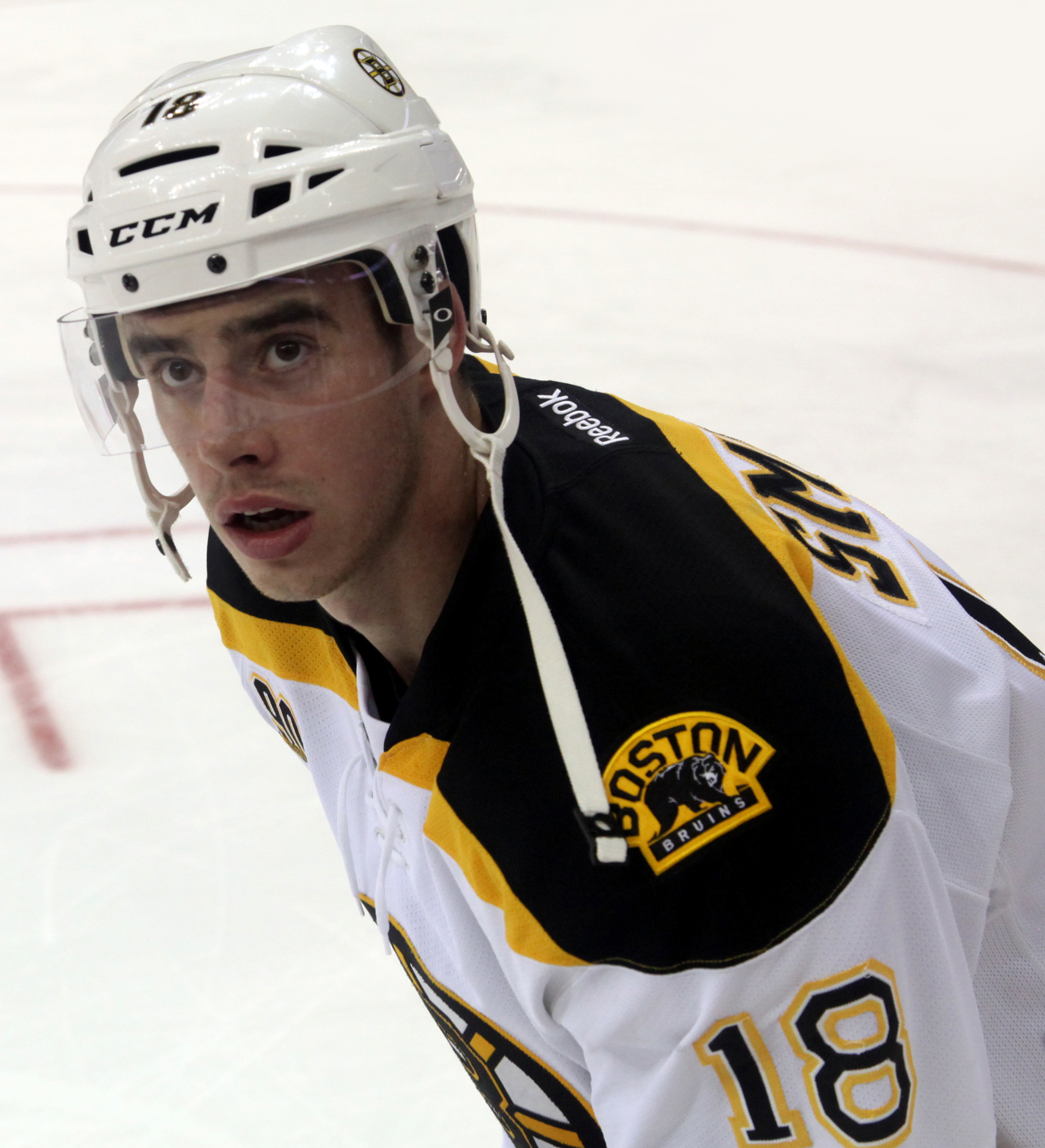
Smith with the Bruins in April 2014

In July 2013, Smith was included in a blockbuster trade between Dallas and the Boston Bruins, which sent him, Loui Eriksson, Joe Morrow and Matt Fraser to Boston in exchange for Tyler Seguin, Rich Peverley and Ryan Button. During the pre-season, Smith was placed on the Bruins' third line with Chris Kelly and Carl Söderberg. However, as a result of injuries, Smith was moved up to a line with Patrice Bergeron and Loui Eriksson. He finished the regular season with 19 goals and 30 assists which included 17 points throughout November. As a result of his success, the New England Sports Network (NESN) TV network named Smith the 45th annual "7th Player." The "7th Player" is awarded to the Boston Bruin who most exceeded all expectations that season, as voted by the team's fans.

The following year, Smith finished with 13 goals and 27 assists, plus four goals and an assist in 12 playoff games.

==== Florida Panthers (2015–2017) ====
On July 1, 2015, Smith was traded by the Bruins, along with Marc Savard's contract, to the Florida Panthers in exchange for Jimmy Hayes. During his first season with the team, Smith recorded a new career high 50 points in 82 games and tied for third on the team in goal scoring. On July 3, 2016, Smith signed a five-year, $25 million contract extension with the Panthers. Following the contract extension, Smith had a self described "disappointing year" after he recorded 15 goals and 22 assists in the 2016–17 season.

==== Vegas Golden Knights (2017–2023) ====
On June 21, 2017, Smith was traded at the 2017 NHL expansion draft to the Vegas Golden Knights due to salary cap issues. Both he and teammate Jonathan Marchessault were acquired by the Golden Knights, with the Panthers receiving a fourth-round pick in the 2018 NHL entry draft. During his tenure in Florida, Smith had 87 points in 162 games. Following the trade, Smith began the 2017–18 season as a winger with William Karlsson and Marchessault. Their line received early praise for being amongst the team's best lines, with them all scoring high by November. Upon entering January, Smith had become a prominent fixture on the first line as they had combined for 19 goals and 24 assists. The following month, Smith was recognized as an NHL Third Star of the Month of February after posting 20 points in 14 games. Smith would go on to score a career-high 60 points in the regular season as the Knights advanced all the way to the 2018 Stanley Cup Final. During their postseason run, Smith scored five goals and 17 assists.

Following his career-high season, Smith stayed consistent with his offensive abilities and recorded the second-best statistical season of his career. He tied Marchessault for the team lead in assists with 34 and surpassed the 50-point mark for the second season in a row. Upon returning to the Knights, Smith remained with Marchessault and Karlsson and recorded his 100th career NHL goal in a 4–2 win over the Pittsburgh Penguins on October 11, 2018. Later that season, he also appeared in his 500th career NHL game, while also maintaining eight points in his past three games. As the Knights qualified for the Stanley Cup playoffs for the second consecutive year, Smith recorded one goal and five assists in their series against the San Jose Sharks.

At the time of the pausing of the 2019–20 season due to the COVID-19 pandemic, Smith had scored a career high 27 goals in 71 games played. After surpassing the Chicago Blackhawks in the first round of the 2020 Stanley Cup playoffs, Smith tied with Mark Stone for team lead in points. As the playoffs continued, Smith experienced an 11-game goal drought which was snapped in game five of the Western Conference Final against the Dallas Stars.

Following the naming of Mark Stone as team captain, Smith was appointed an alternate captain alongside Alex Pietrangelo. While playing in his 628 career game, Smith recorded his first professional hat-trick in a 4–1 win over the St. Louis Blues on May 9, 2021.

On July 13, 2022, Smith signed a three-year, $15 million contract to remain with the Golden Knights.

By the 2022–23 season, Smith was one of six remaining original members of the Golden Knights, alongside Marchessault, Karlsson, Brayden McNabb, Shea Theodore and William Carrier. The team reached the Stanley Cup Final for the second time, winning the Cup over the Florida Panthers in five games. Smith and four of the other original Golden Knights started the decisive game five.

==== Pittsburgh Penguins (2023–2024) ====
Smith with the Golden Knights in 2026

On June 28, 2023, Smith was traded by the Golden Knights to the Pittsburgh Penguins in exchange for a third-round pick in the 2024 NHL entry draft. The move was precipitated by the Golden Knights' desire to retain newly-acquired forward Ivan Barbashev, with general manager Kelly McCrimmon stating "to get there, we moved Reilly to Pittsburgh to facilitate some of the other moves that we want to make." During the first game of the 2023–24 season, Smith and Bryan Rust scored in the first 41 seconds of the third period to become the second-fastest Penguins teammates to score at the start of a period in franchise history.

==== New York Rangers (2024–2025) ====
On July 1, 2024, Smith was traded by the Penguins to the New York Rangers in exchange for a conditional fifth-round draft pick in 2025 and a second-round draft pick in the 2027 draft.

==== Return to Vegas (2025–2026) ====
On March 6, 2025, Smith was traded by the Rangers back to the Golden Knights, in exchange for Brendan Brisson and a third-round draft pick in 2025. Following the season, Smith signed a further one-year extension to remain with Vegas, avoiding free agency.

== Career statistics ==
Medal record

Ice hockey

Representing Canada East

World Junior A Challenge
Bronze medal – third place	2008 Camrose	

			Regular season					Playoffs
Season	Team	League	GP	G	A	Pts	PIM	GP	G	A	Pts	PIM
2006–07	Toronto Nationals AAA	GTHL U16	70	80	77	157	56	—	—	—	—	—
2007–08	St. Michael's Buzzers	OPJHL	38	31	24	55	92	1	0	0	0	2
2008–09	St. Michael's Buzzers	OJHL	49	27	48	75	44	6	9	5	15	10
2009–10	Miami RedHawks	CCHA	44	8	12	20	24	—	—	—	—	—
2010–11	Miami RedHawks	CCHA	38	28	26	54	18	—	—	—	—	—
2011–12	Miami RedHawks	CCHA	39	30	18	48	22	—	—	—	—	—
2011–12	Dallas Stars	NHL	3	0	0	0	2	—	—	—	—	—
2012–13	Texas Stars	AHL	45	14	21	35	20	7	0	4	4	0
2012–13	Dallas Stars	NHL	37	3	6	9	8	—	—	—	—	—
2013–14	Boston Bruins	NHL	82	20	31	51	14	12	4	1	5	0
2014–15	Boston Bruins	NHL	81	13	27	40	20	—	—	—	—	—
2015–16	Florida Panthers	NHL	82	25	25	50	31	6	4	4	8	0
2016–17	Florida Panthers	NHL	80	15	22	37	17	—	—	—	—	—
2017–18	Vegas Golden Knights	NHL	67	22	38	60	24	20	5	17	22	10
2018–19	Vegas Golden Knights	NHL	74	19	34	53	14	7	1	5	6	0
2019–20	Vegas Golden Knights	NHL	71	27	27	54	20	20	5	9	14	8
2020–21	Vegas Golden Knights	NHL	53	14	11	25	18	19	3	7	10	4
2021–22	Vegas Golden Knights	NHL	56	16	22	38	8	—	—	—	—	—
2022–23	Vegas Golden Knights	NHL	78	26	30	56	16	22	4	10	14	14
2023–24	Pittsburgh Penguins	NHL	76	13	27	40	18	—	—	—	—	—
2024–25	New York Rangers	NHL	58	10	19	29	22	—	—	—	—	—
2024–25	Vegas Golden Knights	NHL	21	3	8	11	2	11	3	1	4	4
2025–26	Vegas Golden Knights	NHL	69	16	10	26	4	7	0	2	2	2
NHL totals			988	242	337	579	238	124	29	56	85	42

== Awards and honours ==
Award	Year
College
All-CCHA First Team	2011, 2012
CCHA All-Tournament Team	2011, 2012
AHCA West First-Team All-American	2012
Boston Bruins
Seventh Player Award	2014
NHL
Stanley Cup champion	2023

Awards and achievements
Preceded by Andy Miele	Perani Cup champion 2011–12	Succeeded by Brady Hjelle
