= 1999 NHL expansion draft =

Player selection draft

General information
- Date: June 25, 1999
- Location: Boston, Massachusetts, U.S.

Overview
- League: National Hockey League
- Expansion team: Atlanta Thrashers
- Expansion season: 1999–2000

The 1999 NHL expansion draft was an expansion draft held by the National Hockey League (NHL) to fill the roster of the league's expansion team for the 1999–2000 season, the Atlanta Thrashers. The draft took place on June 25, 1999, in Boston, Massachusetts, U.S.

== Rules ==
The Thrashers were to select 26 players, one from each existing franchise (except for the Nashville Predators) at the time of the draft. Each franchise was allowed to protect either one goaltender, five defensemen, and nine forwards or two goaltenders, three defensemen, and seven forwards. Teams which lost goaltenders in the 1998 NHL expansion draft (Anaheim, Los Angeles, Montreal, New Jersey and the New York Rangers) could not lose a goaltender in the 1999 draft.

The Thrashers were to choose at least three goaltenders, eight defensemen, and thirteen forwards. Their final two choices could be from any position.

== Protected players ==
=== Eastern Conference ===
Atlantic Division
Position	New Jersey	NY Islanders	NY Rangers	Philadelphia	Pittsburgh
Forwards	Jason Arnott	Mariusz Czerkawski	Adam Graves	Rod Brind'Amour	Matthew Barnaby
Forwards	Patrik Elias	Sean Haggerty	Todd Harvey	Keith Jones	Jan Hrdina
Forwards	Bobby Holik	Brad Isbister	Mike Knuble	Daymond Langkow	Alexei Kovalev
Forwards	Randy McKay	Olli Jokinen	Eric Lacroix	John LeClair	Jaromir Jagr
Forwards	Krzysztof Oliwa	Jorgen Jonsson	Darren Langdon	Eric Lindros	Robert Lang
Forwards	Jay Pandolfo	Claude Lapointe	John MacLean	Sandy McCarthy	Kip Miller
Forwards	Denis Pederson	Mark Lawrence	Petr Nedved	Mark Recchi	Ian Moran
Forwards	Brian Rolston	Mats Lindgren	Kevin Stevens	Mikael Renberg	Martin Straka
Forwards	Petr Sykora	Vladimir Orszagh	Niklas Sundstrom	Valeri Zelepukin	German Titov
Defencemen	Ken Daneyko	Eric Cairns	Jason Doig	Adam Burt	Sven Butenschon
Defencemen	Scott Niedermayer	Zdeno Chara	Brian Leetch	Eric Desjardins	Kevin Hatcher
Defencemen	Lyle Odelein	Kenny Jonsson	Rumun Ndur	Karl Dykhuis	Darius Kasparaitis
Defencemen	Sheldon Souray	Rich Pilon	Peter Popovic	Dan McGillis	Jiri Slegr
Defencemen	Scott Stevens	Barry Richter	Mathieu Schneider	Chris Therien	Brad Werenka
Goaltender		Felix Potvin		John Vanbiesbrouck	Tom Barrasso

Northeast Division
Position	Boston	Buffalo	Montreal	Ottawa	Toronto
Forwards	Jason Allison	Stu Barnes	Benoit Brunet	Daniel Alfredsson	Sergei Berezin
Forwards	Ken Belanger	Curtis Brown	Shayne Corson	Radek Bonk	Mike Johnson
Forwards	Anson Carter	Michal Grosek	Saku Koivu	Vyacheslav Butsayev	Igor Korolev
Forwards	Rob DiMaio	Brian Holzinger	Trevor Linden	Andreas Dackell	Fredrik Modin
Forwards	Steve Heinze	Michael Peca	Martin Rucinsky	Bruce Gardiner	Yanic Perreault
Forwards	Dmitri Khristich	Wayne Primeau	Brian Savage	Steve Martins	Steve Sullivan
Forwards	Randy Robitaille	Miroslav Satan	Turner Stevenson	Shawn McEachern	Mats Sundin
Forwards	Tim Taylor	Vaclav Varada	Scott Thornton	Vaclav Prospal	Steve Thomas
Forwards	Landon Wilson	Dixon Ward	Dainius Zubrus	Alexei Yashin	Todd Warriner
Defencemen	Ray Bourque	Jay McKee	Patrice Brisebois	Igor Kravchuk	Bryan Berard
Defencemen	Kyle McLaren	Richard Smehlik	Vladimir Malakhov	Janne Laukkanen	Sylvain Cote
Defencemen	Don Sweeney	Rhett Warrener	Craig Rivet	Lance Pitlick	Alexander Karpovtsev
Defencemen	Mattias Timander	Jason Woolley	Igor Ulanov	Wade Redden	Chris McAllister
Defencemen	Darren Van Impe	Alexei Zhitnik	Eric Weinrich	Jason York	Dmitri Yushkevich
Goaltender	Byron Dafoe	Dominik Hasek		Patrick Lalime	Curtis Joseph

Southeast Division
Position	Carolina	Florida	Tampa Bay	Washington
Forwards	Bates Battaglia	Pavel Bure	Colin Forbes	James Black
Forwards	Ron Francis	Radek Dvorak	Chris Gratton	Peter Bondra
Forwards	Martin Gelinas	Viktor Kozlov	Steve Kelly	Benoit Gratton
Forwards	Sami Kapanen	Ryan Johnson	Michael Nylander	Steve Konowalchuk
Forwards	Andrei Kovalenko	Bill Lindsay	Robert Petrovicky	Andrei Nikolishin
Forwards	Kent Manderville	Scott Mellanby	Mike Sillinger	Adam Oates
Forwards	Jeff O'Neill	Rob Niedermayer	Corey Spring	Chris Simon
Forwards	Keith Primeau	Chris Wells	Darcy Tucker	Jaroslav Svejkovsky
Forwards	Gary Roberts	Ray Whitney	Rob Zamuner	Richard Zednik
Defencemen	Steven Halko	Bret Hedican	Drew Bannister	Sergei Gonchar
Defencemen	Sean Hill	Filip Kuba	Cory Cross	Calle Johansson
Defencemen	Marek Malik	Paul Laus	Sergey Gusev	Ken Klee
Defencemen	Nolan Pratt	Robert Svehla	Petr Svoboda	Joe Reekie
Defencemen	Glen Wesley	Mike Wilson		Brendan Witt
Goaltender	Arturs Irbe	Sean Burke	Kevin Hodson	Olaf Kolzig

=== Western Conference ===
Central Division
Position	Chicago	Detroit	St. Louis
Forwards	Tony Amonte	Kris Draper	Jim Campbell
Forwards	Eric Daze	Sergei Fedorov	Craig Conroy
Forwards	Doug Gilmour	Tomas Holmstrom	Pavol Demitra
Forwards	Jean-Yves Leroux	Vyacheslav Kozlov	Mike Eastwood
Forwards	Josef Marha	Martin Lapointe	Jamal Mayers
Forwards	Dean McAmmond	Kirk Maltby	Scott Pellerin
Forwards	Chris Murray	Darren McCarty	Pascal Rheaume
Forwards	Reid Simpson	Brendan Shanahan	Pierre Turgeon
Forwards	Alexei Zhamnov	Steve Yzerman	Scott Young
Defencemen	Jamie Allison	Chris Chelios	Jeff Finley
Defencemen	Brad Brown	Mathieu Dandenault	Al MacInnis
Defencemen	Anders Eriksson	Nicklas Lidstrom	Ricard Persson
Defencemen	Boris Mironov	Larry Murphy	Libor Prochazka
Defencemen	Bryan Muir	Aaron Ward	Chris Pronger
Goaltender	Jeff Hackett	Chris Osgood	Roman Turek

Northwest Division
Position	Calgary	Colorado	Edmonton	Vancouver
Forwards	Valeri Bure	Adam Deadmarsh	Josef Beranek	Todd Bertuzzi
Forwards	Rene Corbet	Shean Donovan	Mike Grier	Donald Brashear
Forwards	Hnat Domenichelli	Theoren Fleury	Bill Guerin	Darby Hendrickson
Forwards	Jarome Iginla	Peter Forsberg	Chad Kilger	Brad May
Forwards	Andrei Nazarov	Valeri Kamensky	Georges Laraque	Mark Messier
Forwards	Jeff Shantz	Claude Lemieux	Todd Marchant	Alexander Mogilny
Forwards	Cory Stillman	Shjon Podein	Ethan Moreau	Markus Naslund
Forwards	Jason Wiemer	Joe Sakic	Ryan Smyth	Dave Scatchard
Forwards	Clarke Wilm	Stephane Yelle	Doug Weight	Harry York
Defencemen	Tommy Albelin	Greg de Vries	Sean Brown	Chad Allan
Defencemen	Sami Helenius	Adam Foote	Roman Hamrlik	Adrian Aucoin
Defencemen	Cale Hulse	Jon Klemm	Christian Laflamme	Ed Jovanovski
Defencemen	Todd Simpson	Aaron Miller	Janne Niinimaa	Bryan McCabe
Defencemen		Sandis Ozolinsh	Jason Smith	Jason Strudwick
Goaltender	Fred Brathwaite	Patrick Roy	Tommy Salo	Kevin Weekes

Pacific Division
Position	Anaheim	Dallas	Los Angeles	Phoenix	San Jose
Forwards	Frank Banham	Brett Hull	Donald Audette	Greg Adams	Michal Bros
Forwards	Ted Donato	Mike Keane	Craig Johnson	Shane Doan	Vincent Damphousse
Forwards	Travis Green	Jamie Langenbrunner	Ian Laperriere	Dallas Drake	Jeff Friesen
Forwards	Paul Kariya	Jere Lehtinen	Glen Murray	Tavis Hansen	Steve Guolla
Forwards	Mike Leclerc	Grant Marshall	Luc Robitaille	Robert Reichel	Stephane Matteau
Forwards	Marty McInnis	Mike Modano	Zigmund Palffy	Jeremy Roenick	Brantt Myhres
Forwards	Steve Rucchin	Joe Nieuwendyk	Bryan Smolinski	Keith Tkachuk	Owen Nolan
Forwards	Teemu Selanne	Derek Plante	Jozef Stumpel	Rick Tocchet	Mike Ricci
Forwards	Jeremy Stevenson	Jamie Wright	Marko Tuomainen	Juha Ylonen	Ron Stern
Defencemen	Kevin Haller	Derian Hatcher	Aki Berg	Keith Carney	Bryan Marchment
Defencemen	Jason Marshall	Brad Lukowich	Rob Blake	Jyrki Lumme	Jeff Norton
Defencemen	Fredrik Olausson	Richard Matvichuk	Mattias Norstrom	Teppo Numminen	Marcus Ragnarsson
Defencemen	Ruslan Salei	Darryl Sydor	Jaroslav Modry	Deron Quint	Mike Rathje
Defencemen	Pavel Trnka	Sergei Zubov	Sean O'Donnell	Oleg Tverdovsky	Gary Suter
Goaltender		Ed Belfour		Nikolai Khabibulin	Steve Shields

== Draft results ==
These results are numbered 1–26 for aesthetic purposes, but the players were not necessarily chosen in this order. As the Thrashers were the only team participating in the draft, the order is inconsequential.

#	Player	Drafted from
1.	Trevor Kidd (G)	Carolina Hurricanes
2.	Norm Maracle (G)	Detroit Red Wings
3.	Corey Schwab (G)	Tampa Bay Lightning
4.	Petr Buzek (D)	Dallas Stars
5.	Brett Clark (D)	Montreal Canadiens
6.	Kevin Dean (D)	New Jersey Devils
7.	Maxim Galanov (D)	Pittsburgh Penguins
8.	David Harlock (D)	New York Islanders
9.	Jamie Pushor (D)	Mighty Ducks of Anaheim
10.	Darryl Shannon (D)	Buffalo Sabres
11.	Chris Tamer (D)	New York Rangers
12.	Mark Tinordi (D)	Washington Capitals
13.	Yannick Tremblay (D)	Toronto Maple Leafs
14.	Kelly Buchberger (RW)	Edmonton Oilers
15.	Sylvain Cloutier (C)	Chicago Blackhawks
16.	Phil Crowe (RW)	Ottawa Senators
17.	Peter Ferraro (RW)	Boston Bruins
18.	Johan Garpenlov (LW)	Florida Panthers
19.	Jody Hull (RW)	Philadelphia Flyers
20.	Matt Johnson (LW)	Los Angeles Kings
21.	Tomi Kallio (LW)	Colorado Avalanche
22.	Steve Staios (RW/D)	Vancouver Canucks
23.	Mike Stapleton (C)	Phoenix Coyotes
24.	Ed Ward (RW)	Calgary Flames
25.	Terry Yake (C)	St. Louis Blues
26.	Alexei Yegorov (RW)	San Jose Sharks

== Deals ==
In return for agreeing not to select certain unprotected players, the Thrashers were granted concessions by other franchises. The trades were officially booked as being for "future considerations":

- Ottawa traded Damian Rhodes to Atlanta on June 18, 1999
- Buffalo traded Dean Sylvester to Atlanta on June 25, 1999
- Calgary traded Andreas Karlsson to Atlanta on June 25, 1999
- Detroit traded Ulf Samuelsson to Atlanta on June 25, 1999
- New Jersey traded Sergei Vyshedkevich to Atlanta on June 25, 1999
- Phoenix traded Scott Langkow to Atlanta on June 25, 1999

== Post-draft ==
Several of the players selected by the Thrashers in the expansion draft did not stay with the team long after the draft. In fact, the Thrashers traded two players later in the same day:

- Trevor Kidd (traded to Florida for Gord Murphy, Daniel Tjarnqvist, Herberts Vasiljevs, and a sixth-round pick (Justin Cox) in the 1999 NHL entry draft)
- Peter Ferraro (traded to Boston for Randy Robitaille)

Other players who were no longer on the Thrashers' roster at the start of the 1999–2000 season include the following:

- Phil Crowe (traded to Nashville for future considerations on June 26, 1999)
- Jamie Pushor (traded to Dallas for Jason Botterill and cash and seventh-round draft pick on July 15, 1999)
- Terry Yake (claimed off waivers by St. Louis on September 30, 1999)
- Alexei Yegorov (released before the season began)
- Mark Tinordi (retired before the season began)

== See also ==
- 1999 NHL entry draft
- 1999–2000 NHL season
