= 1998 NHL expansion draft =

Player selection draft

General information
- Date: June 26, 1998
- Location: Buffalo, New York, U.S.

Overview
- 26 total selections
- League: National Hockey League
- Expansion team: Nashville Predators
- Expansion season: 1998–99

The 1998 NHL expansion draft was an expansion draft held by the National Hockey League (NHL) to fill the roster of the league's expansion team for the 1998–99 season, the Nashville Predators. The draft took place on June 26, 1998, in Buffalo, New York, U.S.

== Rules ==
The Predators were to select 26 players, one from each of the 26 existing franchises at the time of the draft.

First- and second-year pros were exempt from being selected in the draft. Each of the 26 franchises in the league were allowed to protect either one goaltender, five defensemen and nine forwards or two goaltenders, three defensemen and seven forwards.

Of the unprotected players, each franchise had to include at least one forward and one defenseman who appeared in 40 games in the 1997–98 season. Each franchise also had to include at least one goaltender who appeared in 10 games in the 1997–98 season, and a minimum of 25 games since the 1995–96 season. These minimums for goaltenders were put into place in order to avoid manipulation of rosters, such as what occurred before the 1992 NHL expansion draft, which weakened the talent pool available in the draft.

This draft was interesting in that some of the players the Predators chose (e.g. Mike Richter and Uwe Krupp) were set to become unrestricted free agents on July 1, just days after the draft. The Predators knew they would have little chance to sign these players; however, they received a compensatory pick in the 1999 NHL entry draft for each player they "lost".

== Protected players ==
=== Eastern Conference ===
Atlantic Division
Position	New Jersey	NY Islanders	NY Rangers	Philadelphia	Pittsburgh
Forwards	Sergei Brylin	Mariusz Czerkawski	Adam Graves	Rod Brind'Amour	Stu Barnes
Forwards	Patrik Elias	Jason Dawe	Wayne Gretzky	Alexandre Daigle	Ron Francis
Forwards	Bobby Holik	Trevor Linden	Todd Harvey	Chris Gratton	Jaromir Jagr
Forwards	Randy McKay	Sergei Nemchinov	Alexei Kovalev	Trent Klatt	Robert Lang
Forwards	Krzysztof Oliwa	Gino Odjick	Pat LaFontaine	John LeClair	Mario Lemieux
Forwards	Denis Pederson	Zigmund Palffy	Darren Langdon	Eric Lindros	Ian Moran
Forwards	Brian Rolston	Robert Reichel	Kevin Stevens	Mike Maneluk	Petr Nedved
Forwards	Vadim Sharifijanov	Joe Sacco	Niklas Sundstrom	Shjon Podein	Martin Straka
Forwards	Petr Sykora	Bryan Smolinski		Mike Sillinger	German Titov
Forwards					Tyler Wright
Defencemen	Brad Bombardir	Bryan Berard	Jeff Beukeboom	Dave Babych	Kevin Hatcher
Defencemen	Ken Daneyko	Zdeno Chara	Eric Cairns	Eric Desjardins	Darius Kasparaitis
Defencemen	Scott Niedermayer	Kenny Jonsson	Maxim Galanov	Jeff Lank	Jiri Slegr
Defencemen	Lyle Odelein	Scott Lachance	Alexander Karpovtsev	Luke Richardson	Chris Tamer
Defencemen	Scott Stevens	Rich Pilon	Brian Leetch	Petr Svoboda	Brad Werenka
Defencemen			Ulf Samuelsson	Chris Therien	
Goaltender	Martin Brodeur	Tommy Salo	Robb Stauber	Ron Hextall	Tom Barrasso

Northeast Division
Position	Boston	Buffalo	Montreal	Ottawa	Toronto
Forwards	Jason Allison	Donald Audette	Shayne Corson	Daniel Alfredsson	Lonny Bohonos
Forwards	Rob DiMaio	Matthew Barnaby	Vincent Damphousse	Radek Bonk	Nathan Dempsey
Forwards	Ted Donato	Curtis Brown	Saku Koivu	Phil Crowe	Tie Domi
Forwards	Steve Heinze	Michal Grosek	Mark Recchi	Bruce Gardiner	Darby Hendrickson
Forwards	Dmitri Khristich	Brian Holzinger	Martin Rucinsky	Shawn McEachern	Kris King
Forwards	Tim Taylor	Michael Peca	Brian Savage	Chris Murray	Igor Korolev
Forwards	Landon Wilson	Derek Plante	Turner Stevenson	Vaclav Prospal	Steve Sullivan
Forwards		Wayne Primeau	Scott Thornton	Shaun Van Allen	Mats Sundin
Forwards		Geoff Sanderson		Alexei Yashin	Todd Warriner
Forwards		Miroslav Satan			
Defencemen	Ray Bourque	Darryl Shannon	Patrice Brisebois	Radim Bicanek	David Cooper
Defencemen	Kyle McLaren	Richard Smehlik	Vladimir Malakhov	Igor Kravchuk	Sylvain Cote
Defencemen	Don Sweeney	Mike Wilson	Dave Manson	Janne Laukkanen	Mathieu Schneider
Defencemen	Darren Van Impe	Jason Woolley	Stephane Quintal	Stanislav Neckar	Jason Smith
Defencemen		Alexei Zhitnik	Craig Rivet	Lance Pitlick	Yannick Tremblay
Defencemen			Igor Ulanov	Jason York	Dmitri Yushkevich
Goaltender	Byron Dafoe	Dominik Hasek	Jocelyn Thibault	Damian Rhodes	Felix Potvin
Goaltender	Robbie Tallas				

Southeast Division
Position	Carolina	Florida	Tampa Bay	Washington
Forwards	Nelson Emerson	Dino Ciccarelli	Mikael Andersson	Craig Berube
Forwards	Martin Gelinas	Radek Dvorak	Craig Janney	Peter Bondra
Forwards	Stu Grimson	Viktor Kozlov	Sandy McCarthy	Joe Juneau
Forwards	Sami Kapanen	Bill Lindsay	Andrei Nazarov	Steve Konowalchuk
Forwards	Robert Kron	Scott Mellanby	Brent Peterson	Andrei Nikolishin
Forwards	Jeff O'Neill	David Nemirovsky	Mikael Renberg	Adam Oates
Forwards	Keith Primeau	Rob Niedermayer	Stephane Richer	Michal Pivonka
Forwards	Gary Roberts	Steve Washburn	Alex Selivanov	Chris Simon
Forwards	Ray Sheppard	Chris Wells	Darcy Tucker	Richard Zednik
Forwards		Ray Whitney	Rob Zamuner	
Defencemen	Adam Burt	Ed Jovanovski	Enrico Ciccone	Sergei Gonchar
Defencemen	Steve Chiasson	Paul Laus	Cory Cross	Calle Johansson
Defencemen	Kevin Haller	Gord Murphy	Jassen Cullimore	Ken Klee
Defencemen	Curtis Leschyshyn	Robert Svehla	Karl Dykhuis	Joe Reekie
Defencemen	Nolan Pratt	Rhett Warrener	David Wilkie	Mark Tinordi
Defencemen	Glen Wesley			Brendan Witt
Goaltender	Trevor Kidd	Kevin Weekes	Bill Ranford	Olaf Kolzig

=== Western Conference ===
Central Division
Position	Chicago	Detroit	St. Louis
Forwards	Tony Amonte	Mathieu Dandenault	Jim Campbell
Forwards	Eric Daze	Kris Draper	Kelly Chase
Forwards	Steve Dubinsky	Sergei Fedorov	Craig Conroy
Forwards	Chad Kilger	Vyacheslav Kozlov	Pavol Demitra
Forwards	Sergei Krivokrasov	Martin Lapointe	Scott Pellerin
Forwards	Ethan Moreau	Igor Larionov	Pascal Rheaume
Forwards	Bob Probert	Kirk Maltby	Pierre Turgeon
Forwards	Jeff Shantz	Darren McCarty	Tony Twist
Forwards	Alexei Zhamnov	Brendan Shanahan	
Forwards		Steve Yzerman	
Defencemen	Chris Chelios	Anders Eriksson	Marc Bergevin
Defencemen	Cam Russell	Yan Golubovsky	Al MacInnis
Defencemen	Gary Suter	Nicklas Lidstrom	Chris McAlpine
Defencemen	Michal Sykora	Larry Murphy	Rudy Poeschek
Defencemen	Eric Weinrich	Aaron Ward	Chris Pronger
Defencemen			Jamie Rivers
Goaltender	Jeff Hackett	Chris Osgood	Grant Fuhr

Northwest Division
Position	Calgary	Colorado	Edmonton	Vancouver
Forwards	Valeri Bure	Rene Corbet	Josef Beranek	Todd Bertuzzi
Forwards	Andrew Cassels	Adam Deadmarsh	Kelly Buchberger	Donald Brashear
Forwards	Nils Ekman	Shean Donovan	Bill Guerin	Pavel Bure
Forwards	Theoren Fleury	Peter Forsberg	Mats Lindgren	Brad May
Forwards	Ladislav Kohn	Keith Jones	Todd Marchant	Mark Messier
Forwards	Marty McInnis	Valeri Kamensky	Dean McAmmond	Alexander Mogilny
Forwards	Michael Nylander	Eric Lacroix	Rem Murray	Markus Naslund
Forwards	Dave Roche	Claude Lemieux	Ryan Smyth	Dave Scatchard
Forwards	Cory Stillman	Joe Sakic	Doug Weight	Peter Zezel
Forwards	Jason Wiemer	Stephane Yelle	Valeri Zelepukin	
Defencemen	Tommy Albelin	Adam Foote	Drake Berehowsky	Bret Hedican
Defencemen	Jamie Allison	Jon Klemm	Greg de Vries	Jamie Huscroft
Defencemen	Sami Helenius	Sylvain Lefebvre	Roman Hamrlik	Jyrki Lumme
Defencemen	Cale Hulse	Aaron Miller	Boris Mironov	Chris McAllister
Defencemen	Todd Simpson	Sandis Ozolinsh	Reijo Ruotsalainen	Bryan McCabe
Defencemen				Jason Strudwick
Goaltender	Ken Wregget	Patrick Roy	Eric Fichaud	Corey Hirsch

Pacific Division
Position	Anaheim	Dallas	Los Angeles	Phoenix	San Jose
Forwards	Travis Green	Bob Bassen	Matt Johnson	Bob Corkum	Shawn Burr
Forwards	Paul Kariya	Mike Keane	Ian Laperriere	Jim Cummins	Jeff Friesen
Forwards	Josef Marha	Jamie Langenbrunner	Glen Murray	Shane Doan	John MacLean
Forwards	Jim McKenzie	Jere Lehtinen	Yanic Perreault	Dallas Drake	Stephane Matteau
Forwards	Jeff Nielsen	Grant Marshall	Luc Robitaille	Jean-Francois Jomphe	Joe Murphy
Forwards	Steve Rucchin	Mike Modano	Jozef Stumpel	Jeremy Roenick	Owen Nolan
Forwards	Teemu Selanne	Joe Nieuwendyk	Vladimir Tsyplakov	Cliff Ronning	Mike Ricci
Forwards		Brian Skrudland		Keith Tkachuk	
Forwards		Pat Verbeek		Rick Tocchet	
Defencemen	Dave Karpa	Shawn Chambers	Aki Berg	Keith Carney	Bill Houlder
Defencemen	Jason Marshall	Sergey Gusev	Rob Blake	Gerald Diduck	Bryan Marchment
Defencemen	Jamie Pushor	Derian Hatcher	Mattias Norstrom	Jason Doig	Marcus Ragnarsson
Defencemen	Pavel Trnka	Richard Matvichuk	Sean O'Donnell	Teppo Numminen	Mike Rathje
Defencemen		Darryl Sydor		Deron Quint	
Defencemen		Sergei Zubov		Oleg Tverdovsky	
Goaltender	Guy Hebert	Ed Belfour	Stephane Fiset	Nikolai Khabibulin	Steve Shields
Goaltender	Patrick Lalime		Jamie Storr		Mike Vernon

== Draft results ==
These results are numbered 1–26 for aesthetic purposes, but the players were not necessarily chosen in this order. As the Predators were the only team participating in the draft, the order is inconsequential.

#	Player	Drafted from
1.	Frederic Chabot (G)	Los Angeles Kings
2.	Mike Dunham (G)	New Jersey Devils
3.	Mike Richter (G)	New York Rangers
4.	Mikhail Shtalenkov (G)	Mighty Ducks of Anaheim
5.	Tomas Vokoun (G)	Montreal Canadiens
6.	Joel Bouchard (D)	Calgary Flames
7.	Bob Boughner (D)	Buffalo Sabres
8.	J. J. Daigneault (D)	New York Islanders
9.	Al Iafrate (D)	San Jose Sharks
10.	Uwe Krupp (D)	Colorado Avalanche
11.	John Slaney (D)	Phoenix Coyotes
12.	Rob Zettler (D)	Toronto Maple Leafs
13.	Chris Armstrong (D)	Florida Panthers
14.	Blair Atcheynum (RW)	St. Louis Blues
15.	Paul Brousseau (F)	Tampa Bay Lightning
16.	Doug Brown (RW)	Detroit Red Wings
17.	Andrew Brunette (LW)	Washington Capitals
18.	Patrick Cote (LW)	Dallas Stars
19.	Jeff Daniels (LW)	Carolina Hurricanes
20.	Craig Darby (C)	Philadelphia Flyers
21.	Doug Friedman (LW)	Edmonton Oilers
22.	Tony Hrkac (C)	Pittsburgh Penguins
23.	Greg Johnson (C)	Chicago Blackhawks
24.	Denny Lambert (LW)	Ottawa Senators
25.	Mike Sullivan (C)	Boston Bruins
26.	Scott Walker (RW)	Vancouver Canucks

== Deals ==
In return for agreeing not to select certain unprotected players, the Predators were granted concessions by other franchises. The trades not involving Nashville draft picks all officially were booked as being for "future considerations":

- Calgary traded Jim Dowd to Nashville after the Predators agreed not to select a goaltender from the Flames.
- Chicago traded Sergei Krivokrasov to Nashville after the Predators agreed not to select Chris Terreri.
- Los Angeles traded Kimmo Timonen and Jan Vopat to Nashville after the Predators agreed not to select Garry Galley.
- Montreal traded Sebastien Bordeleau to Nashville after the Predators agreed not to select Peter Popovic.
- Philadelphia traded Dominic Roussel and Jeff Staples to Nashville after the Predators agreed not to select Paul Coffey (Nashville also sent the Flyers a seventh-round pick (Cam Ondrik) in the 1998 NHL entry draft).
- San Jose traded Ville Peltonen to Nashville after the Predators agreed not to select Tony Granato (Nashville also sent the Sharks a fifth-round pick (Josh Blackburn) in the 1998 NHL entry draft).
- St. Louis traded Darren Turcotte to Nashville after the Predators agreed not to select Jamie McLennan.

== Post-draft ==
Several of the players selected by the Predators in the expansion draft did not stay with the team long after the draft. Among those moved before the start of the 1998–99 season were the following:

- Mike Sullivan (traded to Phoenix for a pick in the 1999 NHL entry draft on June 30, 1998)
- Uwe Krupp (signed by Detroit on July 7, 1998)
- Tony Hrkac (traded to Dallas for future considerations on July 9, 1998)
- Doug Brown (traded to Detroit for Petr Sykora, a pick in the 1999 draft, and future considerations on July 14, 1998)
- Mike Richter (signed by the New York Rangers on July 15, 1998)
- Frederic Chabot (claimed off waivers by Montreal on July 20, 1998)
- Mikhail Shtalenkov (traded along with Jim Dowd to Edmonton for Eric Fichaud, Drake Berehowsky and Greg de Vries on October 1, 1998)
- Al Iafrate (signed by Carolina, then retired before the season began)

== See also ==
- 1998 NHL entry draft
- 1998–99 NHL season
