= 1999 Stanley Cup Final =

1999 ice hockey championship series

	1	2	3	4	5	6	Total
Dallas Stars	2*	4	2	1	2	2***	4
Buffalo Sabres	3*	2	1	2	0	1***	2
- * – Denotes overtime period(s)
- Location(s): Dallas: Reunion Arena (1, 2, 5); Buffalo: Marine Midland Arena (3, 4, 6)
- Coaches: Dallas: Ken Hitchcock; Buffalo: Lindy Ruff
- Captains: Dallas: Derian Hatcher; Buffalo: Michael Peca
- Referees: Terry Gregson (1, 3, 6); Bill McCreary (1, 4, 6); Kerry Fraser (2, 4); Dan Marouelli (2, 5); Don Koharski (3, 5)
- Dates: June 8–19, 1999
- MVP: Joe Nieuwendyk (Stars)
- Series-winning goal: Brett Hull (14:51, third OT)
- Hall of Famers: Stars: Ed Belfour (2011); Guy Carbonneau (2019); Brett Hull (2009); Mike Modano (2014); Joe Nieuwendyk (2011); Sergei Zubov (2019); Sabres: Dominik Hasek (2014); Coaches: Ken Hitchcock (2023); Officials: Bill McCreary (2014)
- Networks: Canada: (English): CBC (French): SRC; United States: (English): Fox (1–2, 5), ESPN (3–4, 6)
- Announcers: (CBC) Bob Cole and Harry Neale (SRC) Claude Quenneville and Michel Bergeron (Fox) Mike Emrick and John Davidson (ESPN) Gary Thorne and Bill Clement

The 1999 Stanley Cup Final was the championship series of the National Hockey League's (NHL) 1998–99 season, and the culmination of the 1999 Stanley Cup playoffs. It was contested by the Eastern Conference champion Buffalo Sabres and the Western Conference champion Dallas Stars. It was the 106th year of the Stanley Cup being contested.

The Sabres were led by captain Michael Peca, head coach Lindy Ruff and goaltender Dominik Hasek. The Stars were led by captain Derian Hatcher, head coach Ken Hitchcock and goaltender Ed Belfour. The Stars defeated the Sabres in six games to win their first Stanley Cup, becoming the eighth post-1967 expansion team to earn a championship, and the first team based in the Southern United States to win the Cup. This was the first Stanley Cup Final to not end in a sweep since 1994.

The series ended with a controversial triple-overtime goal in game six, when replays showed that Stars forward Brett Hull scored with his skate in the crease. Although the Sabres protested later, the league stated that the goal had been reviewed and was judged as a good goal, since Hull had maintained possession of the puck as it exited the crease just before he shot it.

== Background ==
This was the third meeting between teams from Dallas and Buffalo for a major professional sports championship. This previously occurred in two Super Bowls in 1993 and 1994.

=== Buffalo Sabres ===
Buffalo entered the playoffs as the seventh seed in the Eastern Conference. They first swept the second seeded Ottawa Senators, then defeated the sixth seeded Boston Bruins in six games, and then defeated the fourth seeded Toronto Maple Leafs in five games to advance to the Finals. This was Buffalo's first Stanley Cup Final appearance since 1975, in which they fell to the Philadelphia Flyers in six games. The Sabres also became the second seventh seeded team to reach the Finals after the Vancouver Canucks did so in 1994.

=== Dallas Stars ===
Dallas entered the playoffs as the Presidents' Trophy winner for the second consecutive season as they clinched the best record in the NHL once again. They swept the eighth seeded Edmonton Oilers, then defeated the fifth seeded St. Louis Blues in six games, and the second seeded Colorado Avalanche in seven games to advance to the Finals. The Stars became the second team from a Southern state to reach the Stanley Cup Final, joining the Florida Panthers, who accomplished the feat three years prior.

== Game summaries ==
=== Game one ===
June 8	Buffalo Sabres	3–2	OT	Dallas Stars	Reunion Arena	Recap

The opening game was in Dallas and it was the visiting Buffalo Sabres who struck first, winning 3–2 in overtime. Dallas led 1–0 on a power play goal by Brett Hull, but Stu Barnes and Wayne Primeau scored 5:04 apart in the third to give Buffalo a 2–1 lead. Jere Lehtinen tied the game in the final minute of the third period, but Jason Woolley scored at 15:30 of overtime to give the Sabres the series lead.

Scoring summary
Period	Team	Goal	Assist(s)	Time	Score
1st	DAL	Brett Hull (6) – pp	Mike Modano (12) and Jere Lehtinen (2)	10:17	1–0 DAL
2nd	None				
3rd	BUF	Stu Barnes (9)	Joe Juneau (8) and Richard Smehlik (1)	08:33	1–1
3rd	BUF	Wayne Primeau (3) – pp	Alexei Zhitnik (10) and Richard Smehlik (2)	13:37	2–1 BUF
3rd	DAL	Jere Lehtinen (8) – pp	Mike Modano (13) and Sergei Zubov (10)	19:11	2–2
OT	BUF	Jason Woolley (4)	Curtis Brown (6)	15:30	3–2 BUF
Penalty summary
Period	Team	Player	Penalty	Time	PIM
1st	DAL	Sergei Zubov	Roughing	06:36	2:00
1st	BUF	Miroslav Satan	Boarding	08:18	2:00
1st	BUF	James Patrick	High-sticking – double minor	12:46	4:00
1st	BUF	Dixon Ward	Interference	19:11	2:00
2nd	BUF	Vaclav Varada	Goaltender interference	04:53	2:00
2nd	BUF	Alexei Zhitnik	Interference	07:07	2:00
2nd	BUF	Dixon Ward	Roughing	09:34	2:00
2nd	DAL	Craig Ludwig	Hooking	12:21	2:00
2nd	DAL	Richard Matvichuk	Interference	16:33	2:00
3rd	DAL	Darryl Sydor	Tripping – Obstruction	12:10	2:00
3rd	BUF	Jay McKee	Charging	14:17	2:00
OT	BUF	Alexei Zhitnik	Hooking	06:41	2:00
OT	BUF	Geoff Sanderson	Boarding	09:06	2:00

Shots by period
Team	1	2	3	OT	Total
Buffalo	5	4	10	5	24
Dallas	11	13	6	7	37

=== Game two ===
June 10	Buffalo Sabres	2–4	Dallas Stars	Reunion Arena	Recap

With three seconds left in the first period, Dallas center Mike Modano tripped Buffalo goaltender Dominik Hasek, and a number of scrums broke out as time expired. Dallas winger Joe Nieuwendyk fought Buffalo center Brian Holzinger in the circle to the right of Hasek. These were the first fighting majors in three years in the final round, and it was also Nieuwendyk's first fighting major in five years in either the playoffs or regular season.

After the scoreless opening period, the teams traded goals in the middle frame. Craig Ludwig's first goal in 102 playoff games gave Dallas its first lead of the game in the third period, but Alexei Zhitnik tied it 71 seconds later. Brett Hull scored on a slap shot, a one-timer on a pass from Tony Hrkac, from the top of the circle to Hasek's left with 2:50 remaining in the game, but Buffalo had an excellent chance to tie the game with Derian Hatcher being assessed a high-sticking minor 19 seconds later. During the power play, Buffalo pulled Hasek for a 6-on-4 attacking advantage, but the Stars were able to kill the penalty, and Hatcher scored an empty-netter just three seconds after emerging from the penalty box. The empty net goal sealed the win for Dallas, and evened the series at one game apiece. Mike Modano left the game with approximately ten minutes to play after suffering a broken wrist.

Scoring summary
Period	Team	Goal	Assist(s)	Time	Score
1st	None				
2nd	BUF	Michael Peca (8) – pp	Jason Woolley (11) and Miroslav Satan (5)	07:27	1–0 BUF
2nd	DAL	Jamie Langenbrunner (10)	Richard Matvichuk (4) and Joe Nieuwendyk (10)	18:26	1–1
3rd	DAL	Craig Ludwig (1)	Brian Skrudland (2)	04:25	2–1 DAL
3rd	BUF	Alexei Zhitnik (4) – pp	Unassisted	05:36	2–2
3rd	DAL	Brett Hull (7)	Tony Hrkac (2) and Shawn Chambers (2)	17:10	3–2 DAL
3rd	DAL	Derian Hatcher (1) – en	Sergei Zubov (2) and Mike Keane (2)	19:34	4–2 DAL
Penalty summary
Period	Team	Player	Penalty	Time	PIM
1st	DAL	Brian Skrudland	Charging	12:25	2:00
1st	BUF	Alexei Zhitnik	Boarding	15:31	2:00
1st	BUF	Richard Smehlik	Roughing	20:00	2:00
1st	BUF	Alexei Zhitnik	Cross-checking	20:00	2:00
1st	BUF	Brian Holzinger	Fighting – major	20:00	5:00
1st	DAL	Mike Modano	Tripping	20:00	2:00
1st	DAL	Joe Nieuwendyk	Fighting – major	20:00	5:00
1st	DAL	Derian Hatcher	Roughing	20:00	2:00
2nd	DAL	Darryl Sydor	Hooking	05:41	2:00
2nd	BUF	Jason Woolley	Interference	09:19	2:00
2nd	BUF	Vaclav Varada	Tripping – Obstruction	13:14	2:00
2nd	BUF	Alexei Zhitnik	Tripping	20:00	2:00
3rd	DAL	Darryl Sydor	High-sticking	04:50	2:00
3rd	BUF	Vaclav Varada	High-sticking	10:32	2:00
3rd	BUF	Alexei Zhitnik	Hooking	11:48	2:00
3rd	DAL	Derian Hatcher	High-sticking	17:31	2:00

Shots by period
Team	1	2	3	Total
Buffalo	7	10	4	21
Dallas	5	7	19	31

=== Game three ===
June 12	Dallas Stars	2–1	Buffalo Sabres	Marine Midland Arena	Recap

The series shifted to Buffalo for games three and four. It was the visiting Dallas Stars turn to win one on the road, winning 2–1. With Modano hampered by his wrist injury, and Hull leaving the game with a groin injury, Joe Nieuwendyk's two goals, including his sixth game-winner of the playoffs, led Dallas to the win.

Scoring summary
Period	Team	Goal	Assist(s)	Time	Score
1st	None				
2nd	BUF	Stu Barnes (6)	Richard Smehlik (3) and Brian Holzinger (5)	07:51	1–0 BUF
2nd	DAL	Joe Nieuwendyk (10)	Dave Reid (3) and Jamie Langenbrunner (6)	15:33	1–1
3rd	DAL	Joe Nieuwendyk (11)	Jamie Langenbrunner (7) and Dave Reid (4)	09:35	2–1 DAL
Penalty summary
Period	Team	Player	Penalty	Time	PIM
1st	BUF	Erik Rasmussen	Roughing	07:45	2:00
1st	DAL	Shawn Chambers	Roughing	07:45	2:00
1st	DAL	Craig Ludwig	Interference	07:45	2:00
1st	DAL	Richard Matvichuk	Roughing	09:43	2:00
1st	DAL	Brian Skrudland	Slashing	18:13	2:00
1st	DAL	Derian Hatcher	Roughing	18:46	2:00
2nd	BUF	Alexei Zhitnik	Interference	03:38	2:00
2nd	DAL	Mike Modano	Tripping	09:54	2:00
2nd	DAL	Mike Modano	Slashing	12:21	2:00
2nd	BUF	Brian Holzinger	High-sticking	19:09	2:00
2nd	DAL	Mike Modano	Interference	19:23	2:00
3rd	DAL	Tony Hrkac	Tripping	17:38	2:00

Shots by period
Team	1	2	3	Total
Dallas	8	13	8	29
Buffalo	3	6	3	12

=== Game four ===
June 15	Dallas Stars	1–2	Buffalo Sabres	Marine Midland Arena	Recap

Facing a two games to one deficit in the series, the Sabres came through with a 2–1 victory on Dixon Ward's game-winning goal in the second period.

Scoring summary
Period	Team	Goal	Assist(s)	Time	Score
1st	BUF	Geoff Sanderson (4)	Unassisted	08:09	1–0 BUF
1st	DAL	Jere Lehtinen (9) – pp	Mike Modano (14) and Derian Hatcher (6)	10:14	1–1
2nd	BUF	Dixon Ward (7)	Unassisted	08:09	2–1 BUF
3rd	None				
Penalty summary
Period	Team	Player	Penalty	Time	PIM
1st	DAL	Richard Matvichuk	Roughing	03:48	2:00
1st	BUF	Wayne Primeau	Roughing	09:32	2:00
1st	BUF	Jason Woolley	Holding	19:05	2:00
2nd	DAL	Pat Verbeek	Interference	00:21	2:00
2nd	DAL	Craig Ludwig	Interference	11:07	2:00
2nd	DAL	Brian Skrudland	Roughing	14:49	2:00
2nd	BUF	Brian Holzinger	Boarding	16:44	2:00
2nd	BUF	Dominik Hasek	Roughing	20:00	2:00
2nd	BUF	Alexei Zhitnik	Roughing	20:00	2:00
2nd	DAL	Pat Verbeek	Roughing	20:00	2:00
2nd	DAL	Derian Hatcher	Roughing	20:00	2:00
3rd	DAL	Joe Nieuwendyk	Hooking	01:06	2:00
3rd	BUF	Dixon Ward	Roughing – double minor	20:00	4:00
3rd	BUF	Rhett Warrener	Roughing	20:00	2:00
3rd	DAL	Dave Reid	Roughing	20:00	2:00
3rd	DAL	Jamie Langenbrunner	Roughing	20:00	2:00

Shots by period
Team	1	2	3	Total
Dallas	9	9	13	31
Buffalo	7	9	2	18

=== Game five ===
June 17	Buffalo Sabres	0–2	Dallas Stars	Reunion Arena	Recap

With the series tied at two games apiece and returning to Dallas, Ed Belfour made 23 saves to shut out the Sabres, and move Dallas within one win of the Stanley Cup.

Scoring summary
Period	Team	Goal	Assist(s)	Time	Score
1st	None				
2nd	DAL	Darryl Sydor (3) – pp	Mike Modano (11) and Sergei Zubov (12)	02:23	1–0 DAL
3rd	DAL	Pat Verbeek (3)	Richard Matvichuk (5) and Mike Modano (16)	15:21	2–0 DAL
Penalty summary
Period	Team	Player	Penalty	Time	PIM
1st	DAL	Craig Ludwig	Tripping – Obstruction	02:08	2:00
2nd	BUF	Curtis Brown	Interference	01:42	2:00
2nd	BUF	Jason Woolley	Holding – Obstruction	03:31	2:00
2nd	DAL	Jamie Langenbrunner	Roughing	07:44	2:00
3rd	BUF	Wayne Primeau	Roughing	08:21	2:00
3rd	DAL	Darryl Sydor	Roughing	08:21	2:00
3rd	BUF	Rhett Warrener	Slashing	16:31	2:00
3rd	BUF	Alexei Zhitnik	Elbowing	17:27	2:00
3rd	DAL	Joe Nieuwendyk	Roughing	17:27	2:00
3rd	DAL	Brian Skrudland	Tripping – Obstruction	19:29	2:00
3rd	BUF	Rhett Warrener	Roughing	20:00	2:00
3rd	DAL	Derian Hatcher	Roughing	20:00	2:00

Shots by period
Team	1	2	3	Total
Buffalo	9	5	9	23
Dallas	8	7	6	21

=== Game six ===
June 19	Dallas Stars	2–1	3OT	Buffalo Sabres	Marine Midland Arena	Recap

The series shifted back to Marine Midland Arena for Game 6, where the Dallas Stars would seek their first Stanley Cup, while the Buffalo Sabres would fight for a win to extend the series to a seventh and final game.

Dallas, which allowed the first goal in the earlier two games played at Marine Midland Arena, took a 1–0 lead on one of its few scoring chances in the first period when Lehtinen scored his tenth goal of the playoffs at 8:09. The Sabres tied the game with their first goal since the third period of game four when Barnes' wrist shot eluded Belfour with 1:39 to play in the second period.

The game remained tied at one through the third period and the first two overtime periods, despite several chances by both teams to score. At 14:51 of the third overtime period, Brett Hull scored to end the series and win Dallas their first Stanley Cup. Joe Nieuwendyk was awarded the Conn Smythe Trophy as the most valuable player in the playoffs.

It was the longest Cup-winning game in Finals history, and the second-longest Finals game overall, after game one of the 1990 Stanley Cup Final, which ended at 15:13 of the third overtime.

This was the last championship for a Dallas-based major professional sports team until 2011, when the Dallas Mavericks defeated the Miami Heat in that year's NBA Final.

The Stars did make a return trip to the Final the next season, but lost in six games to the Eastern Conference Champion, the New Jersey Devils.

To date, this is the last trip to the Stanley Cup Final for the Sabres.

Scoring summary
Period	Team	Goal	Assist(s)	Time	Score
1st	DAL	Jere Lehtinen (10)	Mike Modano (17) and Craig Ludwig (4)	08:09	1–0 DAL
2nd	BUF	Stu Barnes (7)	Wayne Primeau (4) and Alexei Zhitnik (11)	18:21	1–1
3rd	None				
OT	None				
2OT	None				
3OT	DAL	Brett Hull (8)	Jere Lehtinen (3) and Mike Modano (18)	14:51	2–1 DAL
Penalty summary
Period	Team	Player	Penalty	Time	PIM
1st	None				
2nd	BUF	Geoff Sanderson	Interference	05:19	2:00
2nd	DAL	Craig Ludwig	Interference	10:49	2:00
2nd	DAL	Benoit Hogue	Tripping	14:28	2:00
2nd	BUF	Michael Peca	Slashing	19:27	2:00
3rd	None				
OT	None				
2OT	None				
3OT	None				

Shots by period
Team	1	2	3	OT	2OT	3OT	Total
Dallas	5	11	10	4	13	7	50
Buffalo	11	6	8	12	10	7	54

== Hull's series-ending goal ==
In the third overtime, Jere Lehtinen took a shot from the left circle that was deflected by Brett Hull but stopped by Dominik Hasek. Hull was not in the crease for the first shot. The rebound came near Hull's left skate, which Hull used to kick the puck to his stick, which was just outside the crease. His left skate entered the crease just before his second shot went in and ended the series.

None of the Sabres players or coaches questioned the legality of the goal in the immediate aftermath. It was not until league commissioner Gary Bettman was on the ice to hand out the trophies that Buffalo coach Lindy Ruff returned to his bench and began screaming at Bettman to explain why the goal had not been reviewed. In the Sabres' locker room, players who had seen the replays were infuriated. Hasek recalled, "My first reaction was 'Let's get back on the ice.' But it's 2 o'clock in the morning and I look at everyone and it's like, 'I'm already out of my pants. It's impossible.'"

The NHL had sent a private memo out earlier in the season with a clarification to the in-the-crease rule. The memo stated that if a player was in control of the puck, a skate could be in the crease even if the puck was not, and a goal in that circumstance would count. NHL Director of Officiating Bryan Lewis said after the game that the goal had been reviewed, just as every goal that season had been, and the officials in the video review booth had determined that since Hull was deemed to have been in possession of the puck throughout the play, he was allowed to shoot and score a goal, even though one skate had entered the crease before the puck.

Among Sabres fans, both the game and the play itself are often simply referred to as "No Goal".

== Team rosters ==
Bolded years under Finals appearance indicates year won Stanley Cup.

=== Dallas Stars ===
#	Nat	Player	Position	Hand	Acquired	Place of birth	Finals appearance
1	(Czech Republic)	Roman Turek	G	R	1990	Strakonice, Czechoslovakia	first
20	(Canada)	Ed Belfour	G	L	1997–98	Carman, Manitoba	second (1992)
2	(United States)	Derian Hatcher – **C**	D	L	1990	Sterling Heights, Michigan	first
3	(United States)	Craig Ludwig – **A**	D	L	1991–92	Rhinelander, Wisconsin	third (**1986**, 1989)
5	(Canada)	Darryl Sydor	D	L	1995–96	Edmonton, Alberta	second (1993)
24	(Canada)	Richard Matvichuk	D	L	1991	Edmonton, Alberta	first
27	(United States)	Shawn Chambers	D	L	1995–96	Royal Oak, Michigan	third (1991, **1995**)
17	(Canada)	Brent Severyn	D	L	1998–99	Vegreville, Alberta	first (did not play)
56	(Russia)	Sergei Zubov – **A**	D	R	1996–97	Moscow, Soviet Union	second (**1994**)
9	(United States)	Mike Modano – **A**	C	L	1988	Livonia, Michigan	second (1991)
10	(Canada)	Brian Skrudland	C	L	1997–98	Peace River, Alberta	fourth (**1986**, 1989, 1996)
11	(United States)	Blake Sloan	RW	R	1998–99	Park Ridge, Illinois	first
12	(Canada)	Mike Keane	RW	R	1997–98	Winnipeg, Manitoba	fourth (1989, **1993**, **1996**)
14	(Canada)	Dave Reid	LW	L	1996–97	Toronto, Ontario	first
15	(United States)	Jamie Langenbrunner	RW	R	1993	Cloquet, Minnesota	first
16	(Canada)	Pat Verbeek	RW	R	1996–97	Sarnia, Ontario	first
18	(United States)	Derek Plante	C	L	1998–99	Cloquet, Minnesota	first (did not play)
21	(Canada)	Guy Carbonneau	C	R	1995–96	Sept-Îles, Quebec	fourth (**1986**, 1989, **1993**)
22	(United States)	Brett Hull	RW	R	1998–99	Belleville, Ontario	second (1986)
25	(Canada)	Joe Nieuwendyk – **A**	C	L	1995–96	Oshawa, Ontario	second (**1989**)
26	(Finland)	Jere Lehtinen	RW	R	1992	Espoo, Finland	first
29	(Canada)	Grant Marshall	RW	R	1994–95	Port Credit, Ontario	first (did not play)
33	(Canada)	Benoit Hogue	LW	L	1998–99	Repentigny, Quebec	first
41	(Canada)	Tony Hrkac	C/LW	L	1998–99	Thunder Bay, Ontario	second (1992)
49	(Canada)	Jon Sim	LW	L	1996	New Glasgow, Nova Scotia	first

=== Buffalo Sabres ===
#	Nat	Player	Position	Hand	Acquired	Place of birth	Finals appearance
30	(Canada)	Dwayne Roloson	G	L	1998–99	Simcoe, Ontario	first (did not play)
39	(Czech Republic)	Dominik Hasek	G	L	1992–93	Pardubice, Czechoslovakia	second (1992)
3	(Canada)	James Patrick – **A**	D	R	1998–99	Winnipeg, Manitoba	first
4	(Canada)	Rhett Warrener	D	R	1998–99	Shaunavon, Saskatchewan	second (1996)
5	(Canada)	Jason Woolley	D	L	1994–95	Toronto, Ontario	second (1996)
8	(Canada)	Darryl Shannon	D	L	1995–96	Barrie, Ontario	first
42	(Czech Republic)	Richard Smehlik	D	L	1990	Ostrava, Czechoslovakia	first
44	(Russia)	Alexei Zhitnik	D	L	1994–95	Kyiv, Soviet Union	second (1993)
74	(Canada)	Jay McKee	D	L	1995	Kingston, Ontario	first
9	(United States)	Erik Rasmussen	LW	L	1996	Minneapolis, Minnesota	first
15	(Canada)	Dixon Ward	RW	R	1995–96	Leduc, Alberta	first
17	(Canada)	Randy Cunneyworth	LW	L	1998–99	Etobicoke, Ontario	first
18	(Czech Republic)	Michal Grosek	RW	R	1995–96	Vyškov, Czechoslovakia	first
19	(United States)	Brian Holzinger	C	R	1991	Parma, Ohio	first
22	(Canada)	Wayne Primeau	C	L	1994	Scarborough, Ontario	first
24	(Canada)	Paul Kruse	LW	L	1997–98	Merritt, British Columbia	first
25	(Czech Republic)	Vaclav Varada	RW	L	1993–94	Vsetín, Czechoslovakia	first
27	(Canada)	Michael Peca – **C**	C	R	1995–96	Toronto, Ontario	second (1994)
32	(Canada)	Rob Ray	RW	L	1988	Stirling, Ontario	first
37	(Canada)	Curtis Brown – **A**	C	L	1994	Unity, Saskatchewan	first
41	(Canada)	Stu Barnes	C	R	1998–99	Spruce Grove, Alberta	second (1996)
80	(Canada)	Geoff Sanderson	LW	L	1997–98	Hay River, Northwest Territories	first
81	(Slovakia)	Miroslav Satan	RW	L	1996–97	Jacovce, Czechoslovakia	first
90	(Canada)	Joe Juneau	C	L	1998–99	Pont-Rouge, Quebec	second (1998)

== Stanley Cup engraving ==
The 1999 Stanley Cup was presented to Stars captain Derian Hatcher by NHL Commissioner Gary Bettman following the Stars 2–1 triple overtime win over the Sabres in game six.

1998–99 Dallas Stars

=== Players ===
Centres

- 9 Mike Modano (A)
- 10 Brian Skrudland
- 18 Derek Plante ‡
- 21 Guy Carbonneau
- 25 Joe Nieuwendyk (A)
- 41 Tony Hrkac*
- 49 Jon Sim

Wingers

- 11 Blake Sloan
- 12 Mike Keane
- 14 Dave Reid
- 15 Jamie Langenbrunner
- 16 Pat Verbeek
- 22 Brett Hull
- 26 Jere Lehtinen
- 29 Grant Marshall †
- 33 Benoit Hogue

Defencemen

- 2 Derian Hatcher (Captain)
- 3 Craig Ludwig (A)
- 5 Darryl Sydor
- 17 Brent Severyn ‡
- 24 Richard Matvichuk
- 27 Shawn Chambers
- 56 Sergei Zubov (A)

Goaltenders

- 1 Roman Turek
- 20 Ed Belfour
- * Played both centre and wing.
- † Did not play or dress in the Final.
- ‡ Exemption granted to engrave the name of a player who did not automatically qualify. (Note: Automatic qualification for a player's name to be engraved on the Stanley Cup: Playing in (for a goaltender, dressing for) at least one Stanley Cup Final game or at least half of regular season games for the Stanley Cup winning team.)

=== Coaching and administrative staff ===
- Thomas O. Hicks (Chairman/Owner/Governor), Jim Lites (President), Bob Gainey (Vice President/General Manager)
- Doug Armstrong (Asst. General Manager), Craig Button (Director of Player Personnel), Ken Hitchcock (Head Coach)
- Doug Jarvis (Asst. Coach), Rick Wilson (Asst. Coach), Rick McLaughlin (Vice President-Chief Financial Officer), Jeff Cogen (Vice President-Marketing & Promotions)
- Bill Strong (Vice President-Marketing & Broadcasting), Tim Bernhardt (Director-Amateur Scouting), Doug Overton (Director-Pro Scouting)
- Bob Gernader (Chief Scout), Stu McGregor (Western Scout), Dave Suprenant (Medical Trainer)
- Dave Smith (Equipment Manager), Rick Matthews (Asst. Equipment Manager), Jean-Jacque McQueen (Strength-Conditioning Coach)
- Rick St. Croix (Goaltending Consultant), Dan Stuchal (Director of Team Services), Larry Kelly (Director of Public Relations)

=== Engraving notes ===
- #18 Derek Plante (C) played in 10 regular-season games and 8 playoff games for Dallas, previously 41 regular-season games for Buffalo. #17 Brent Severyn (D) played in 30 regular-season games, missing 22 due to injuries. He spent the entire season with Dallas. They did not play (both healthy scratches) in the Final. As they did not automatically qualify, Dallas successfully requested an exemption to engrave their names.
- Mike Modano and Shawn Chambers were the only players on the roster who had played for the Minnesota North Stars. Chambers left the Stars in the summer of 1991 for Washington. He joined Tampa Bay in the summer of 1992. Chambers won the Stanley Cup first year in New Jersey in 1995, before rejoining the Stars in the summer of 1997. Modano was part of the Stars franchise for the first 20 years of his NHL career.
- #37 Brad Lukowich (D – 14 regular season games and 8 playoff games) and #6 Doug Lidster (D – 7 regular season games and 4 playoff games), both of whom played in the conference finals. They were left off the Stanley Cup engraving due to not qualifying. They were included in the team picture and received Stanley Cup rings.
- Leon Friedrich (Video Coordinator), Craig Lowery (Trainer Asst.), and Doug Warner (Equipment Asst.) were left off the Stanley Cup engraving, but included in the team picture and received Stanley Cup rings.

== Broadcasting ==
In Canada, the series was televised on CBC. In the United States, this was fifth and final year in which coverage of the Cup Finals was split between Fox and ESPN. Fox aired games one, two, and five; while ESPN had games three, four, and six. Had there been a game seven, it would have aired on Fox. Under the U.S. TV contracts that would take effect beginning next season, ABC would take over for Fox as the NHL's network television partner.

== See also ==
- 1998–99 NHL season
- 1999 Stanley Cup playoffs
- List of Stanley Cup champions

== Notes ==
Preceded by Detroit Red Wings; 1998	Dallas Stars; Stanley Cup champions 1999	Succeeded by New Jersey Devils; 2000
