= Chris Armstrong (ice hockey) =

Canadian ice hockey player (born 1975)

- Born: June 26, 1975 (age 50) Regina, Saskatchewan, Canada
- Height: 5 ft 11 in (180 cm)
- Weight: 194 lb (88 kg; 13 st 12 lb)
- Position: Defence
- Shot: Left
- Played for: NHL; Minnesota Wild; Mighty Ducks of Anaheim; NLA; EV Zug; DEL; Augsburger Panther; ERC Ingolstadt; Frankfurt Lions
- National team: Canada
- NHL draft: 57th overall, 1993; Florida Panthers
- Playing career: 1994–2010

Christopher Ryan Armstrong (born June 26, 1975) is a former Canadian professional ice hockey defenceman who was born in Regina, Saskatchewan, but grew up in Whitewood, Saskatchewan.

== Playing career ==
Armstrong was drafted by the Florida Panthers of the National Hockey League in the 1993 NHL entry draft in the third round, 57th overall. He never played a game for the Panthers. The Nashville Predators claimed him in the 1998 NHL Expansion Draft and then in 1999 he was signed as a free agent by the San Jose Sharks.

The Minnesota Wild then claimed Armstrong in the 2000 NHL Expansion Draft. After spells in the IHL, and AHL, he finally made the jump to the NHL for three games in the 2000–01 season with the Wild. His tenure as a Wild did not last long, though, as the New York Islanders signed him as a free agent in 2001.

Armstrong did not play his next NHL game until after he was signed as a free agent by the Mighty Ducks of Anaheim in 2003. He played four games for the Ducks in the 2003–04 season. In seven NHL games, he has no goals, one assist, one point, and no penalty minutes.

He signed with ERC Ingolstadt for the 2004–05 season and spent the next five seasons in the Deutsche Eishockey Liga.

Returning to North America for the 2009–10 season, Armstrong signed as a free agent with the Springfield Falcons of the AHL on December 5, 2009.

== Career statistics ==
=== Regular season and playoffs ===
			Regular season					Playoffs
Season	Team	League	GP	G	A	Pts	PIM	GP	G	A	Pts	PIM
1991–92	Moose Jaw Warriors	WHL	43	2	7	9	19	4	0	0	0	0
1992–93	Moose Jaw Warriors	WHL	67	9	35	44	104	—	—	—	—	—
1993–94	Moose Jaw Warriors	WHL	64	13	55	68	54	—	—	—	—	—
1993–94	Cincinnati Cyclones	IHL	1	0	0	0	0	10	1	3	4	2
1994–95	Moose Jaw Warriors	WHL	66	17	54	71	61	10	2	12	14	22
1994–95	Cincinnati Cyclones	IHL	—	—	—	—	—	9	1	3	4	10
1995–96	Carolina Monarchs	AHL	78	9	33	42	65	—	—	—	—	—
1996–97	Carolina Monarchs	AHL	66	9	23	32	38	—	—	—	—	—
1997–98	Fort Wayne Komets	IHL	79	8	36	44	66	4	0	2	2	4
1998–99	Hershey Bears	AHL	65	12	32	44	30	5	0	1	1	0
1999–00	Kentucky Thoroughblades	AHL	78	9	48	57	77	9	1	5	6	4
2000–01	Cleveland Lumberjacks	IHL	77	9	32	41	42	4	0	2	2	2
2000–01	Minnesota Wild	NHL	3	0	0	0	0	—	—	—	—	—
2001–02	Bridgeport Sound Tigers	AHL	80	10	38	48	49	20	3	8	11	4
2002–03	EV Zug	NLA	21	0	7	7	45	—	—	—	—	—
2002–03	Augsburger Panther	DEL	22	3	16	19	32	—	—	—	—	—
2003–04	Cincinnati Mighty Ducks	AHL	70	9	37	46	48	9	1	3	4	2
2003–04	Mighty Ducks of Anaheim	NHL	4	0	1	1	0	—	—	—	—	—
2004–05	ERC Ingolstadt	DEL	46	5	19	24	36	11	2	6	8	18
2005–06	ERC Ingolstadt	DEL	43	6	16	22	52	7	0	2	2	4
2006–07	Frankfurt Lions	DEL	50	4	17	21	52	8	0	5	5	10
2007–08	Frankfurt Lions	DEL	55	8	24	32	77	12	1	6	7	18
2008–09	Frankfurt Lions	DEL	49	1	12	13	50	5	0	0	0	4
2009–10	Springfield Falcons	AHL	51	5	20	25	28	—	—	—	—	—
NHL totals			7	0	1	1	0	—	—	—	—	—
DEL totals			265	27	104	131	281	43	3	19	22	54

Medal record

Representing Canada

Men's ice hockey

World Junior Championships
Gold medal – first place	1994 Ostrava	

=== International ===
Year	Team	Event	Result	GP	G	A	Pts	PIM
1994	Canada	WJC	1st place, gold medalist(s)	6	0	1	1	0
Junior totals				6	0	1	1	0

== Awards ==
- WHL East First All-Star Team – 1994
- WHL East Second All-Star Team – 1995
