= Richard Matvichuk =

Canadian ice hockey player (born 1973)

- Born: February 5, 1973 (age 53) Edmonton, Alberta, Canada
- Height: 6 ft 3 in (191 cm)
- Weight: 215 lb (98 kg; 15 st 5 lb)
- Position: Defence
- Shot: Left
- Played for: Minnesota North Stars; Dallas Stars; New Jersey Devils
- National team: Canada
- NHL draft: 8th overall, 1991; Minnesota North Stars
- Playing career: 1992–2008

Richard Dorian Matvichuk (born February 5, 1973) is a Canadian former ice hockey defenceman. He played 14 seasons in the National Hockey League with the Minnesota North Stars/Dallas Stars, and the New Jersey Devils of the National Hockey League.

== Playing career ==
Although he was born in Edmonton, Alberta, Matvichuk was raised in the nearby city of Fort Saskatchewan. Matvichuk was drafted eighth overall in the 1991 NHL entry draft by the Minnesota North Stars, and made the transition, along with several other players, including Mike Modano and Derian Hatcher, to the franchise's move to Dallas, and played 733 regular season games as a Dallas Star. Matvichuk played 12 years for the Stars, scoring 38 goals and 129 assists, although with a rather low average of penalty minutes compared with his physical style of play.

Matvichuk was also a part of the 1999 Stanley Cup-winning team which brought Dallas their first championship trophy. He became a free agent in the 2004 NHL offseason. He was later signed by the New Jersey Devils, making a similar Stars-to-Devils transition as Jamie Langenbrunner and Joe Nieuwendyk. He missed all but the last game of the 2006–07 season after having back surgery. He was released by the Columbus Blue Jackets during the 2008 preseason, when he was there on a tryout basis.

== Coaching ==
On May 4, 2012, Matvichuk was announced as the assistant general manager and defensive coach of Central Hockey League's Allen Americans. On June 12, 2014, he was named the head coach of the ECHL's Missouri Mavericks. On June 2, 2016, Matvichuk was named head coach of the Western Hockey League's Prince George Cougars. He was fired as head coach of the Cougars on February 8, 2019, after an overall 85–89–22 record with the team that was on an eleven-game losing streak during the 2018–19 season.

== Career statistics ==
=== Regular season and playoffs ===
			Regular season					Playoffs
Season	Team	League	GP	G	A	Pts	PIM	GP	G	A	Pts	PIM
1988–89	Fort Saskatchewan Traders	AJHL	58	7	36	43	147	—	—	—	—	—
1989–90	Saskatoon Blades	WHL	56	8	24	32	126	10	2	8	10	16
1990–91	Saskatoon Blades	WHL	68	13	36	49	117	—	—	—	—	—
1991–92	Saskatoon Blades	WHL	58	14	40	54	126	22	1	9	10	61
1992–93	Minnesota North Stars	NHL	53	2	3	5	26	—	—	—	—	—
1992–93	Kalamazoo Wings	IHL	3	0	1	1	6	—	—	—	—	—
1993–94	Dallas Stars	NHL	25	0	3	3	22	7	1	1	2	12
1993–94	Kalamazoo Wings	IHL	43	8	17	25	84	—	—	—	—	—
1994–95	Dallas Stars	NHL	14	0	2	2	14	5	0	2	2	4
1994–95	Kalamazoo Wings	IHL	17	0	6	6	16	—	—	—	—	—
1995–96	Dallas Stars	NHL	73	6	16	22	71	—	—	—	—	—
1996–97	Dallas Stars	NHL	57	5	7	12	87	7	0	1	1	20
1997–98	Dallas Stars	NHL	74	3	15	18	63	16	1	1	2	14
1998–99	Dallas Stars	NHL	64	3	9	12	51	22	1	5	6	20
1999–00	Dallas Stars	NHL	70	4	21	25	42	23	2	5	7	14
2000–01	Dallas Stars	NHL	78	4	16	20	62	10	0	0	0	14
2001–02	Dallas Stars	NHL	82	9	12	21	52	—	—	—	—	—
2002–03	Dallas Stars	NHL	68	1	5	6	58	12	0	3	3	8
2003–04	Dallas Stars	NHL	75	1	20	21	36	5	0	1	1	8
2005–06	New Jersey Devils	NHL	62	1	10	11	40	7	0	0	0	4
2006–07	New Jersey Devils	NHL	1	0	0	0	0	9	0	0	0	10
2007–08	Lowell Devils	AHL	42	1	3	4	40	—	—	—	—	—
NHL totals			796	39	139	178	624	123	5	19	24	128

=== International ===
Year	Team	Event	GP	G	A	Pts	PIM
1992	Canada	WJC	4	0	0	0	2
2002	Canada	WC	7	1	0	1	6
Junior totals			4	0	0	0	2
Senior totals			7	1	0	1	6

== Awards ==
- WHL East First All-Star Team – 1992
- Stanley Cup champion – 1999

Preceded by Derian Hatcher	Minnesota North Stars first-round draft pick 1991	Succeeded by Todd Harvey
