= Mike Modano =

American ice hockey player (born 1970)

- Hockey Hall of Fame, 2014
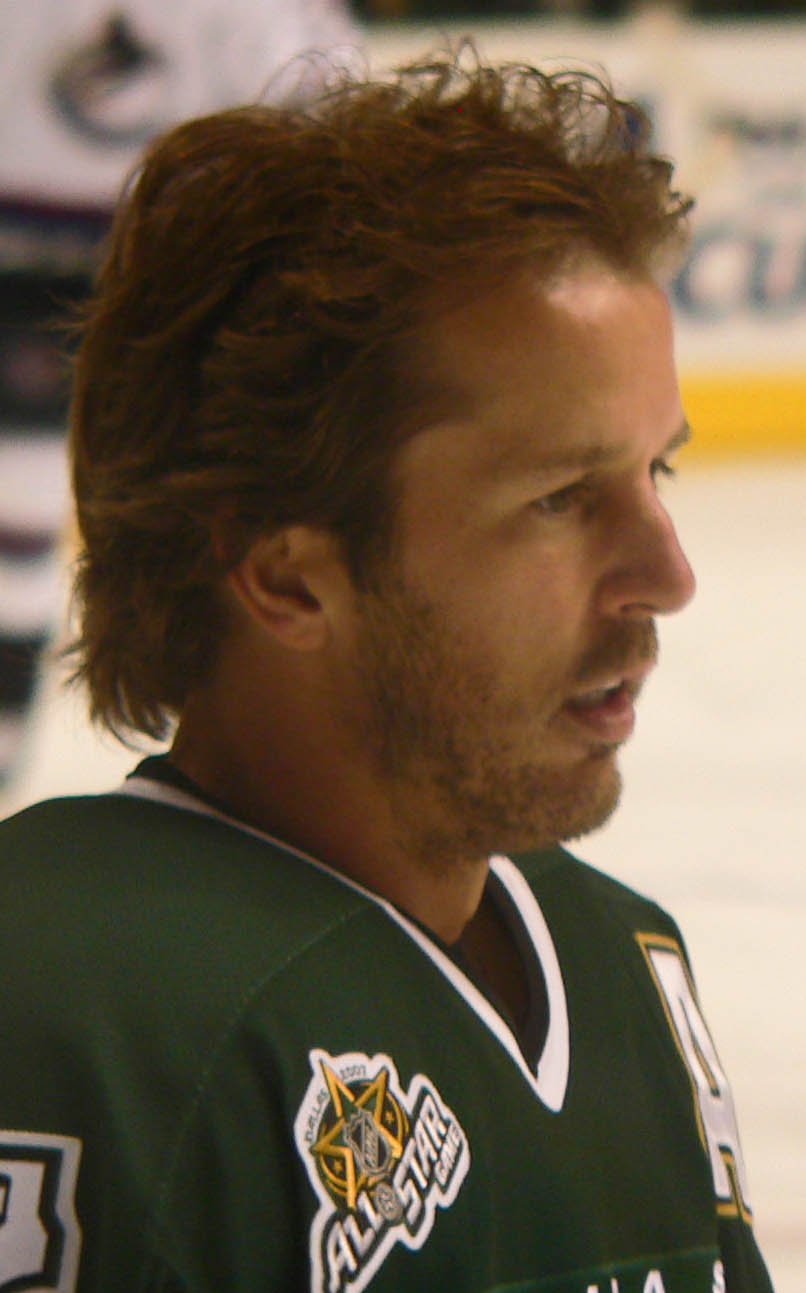
- Modano with the Dallas Stars in April 2007
- Born: June 7, 1970 (age 56) Livonia, Michigan, U.S.
- Height: 6 ft 3 in (191 cm)
- Weight: 212 lb (96 kg; 15 st 2 lb)
- Position: Center
- Shot: Left
- Played for: Minnesota North Stars; Dallas Stars; Detroit Red Wings
- National team: United States
- NHL draft: 1st overall, 1988; Minnesota North Stars
- Playing career: 1989–2011
- Website: www.mikemodano.com

Michael Thomas Modano Jr. (/moʊˈdɑːnoʊ/; born June 7, 1970) is an American former professional ice hockey player. He played as a center and spent most of his career with the Minnesota North Stars/Dallas Stars franchise. He spent the final season of his career with his hometown Detroit Red Wings.

The all-time goal-scoring leader amongst American-born players in NHL history, Modano is widely regarded as one of the greatest American-born ice hockey players of all time. He was drafted first overall by the North Stars in 1988. After the team moved to Texas, he led the Stars to two straight first-place regular season finishes in 1998 and 1999, and the Stanley Cup in 1999.

Modano is considered one of the most influential figures in popularizing ice hockey in Texas and the southern United States. Modano was inducted into the Hockey Hall of Fame on November 17, 2014. In 2017, he was named one of the 100 Greatest NHL Players. In 2019, he was inducted into the IIHF Hall of Fame.

== Early life ==
Modano was born in Livonia, Michigan, the third child and only son of Michael Sr. and Karen Modano. He grew up in Highland Township, and due to causing problems at school with his mischievous behavior, a friend of his father suggested to put Modano in a team sport to get him controlled. Michael Sr. was a fan of hockey, and decided to teach ice skating to seven-year-old Modano. He learned it well, and six months later was put in local hockey teams. As a youth, he was part of a Detroit Red Wings team in the 1982 Quebec International Pee-Wee Hockey Tournament. To spend his minor hockey career with the Detroit Little Caesar's Triple AAA Hockey Club, the Modano family moved to Westland, where he also attended Franklin High School (Livonia, Michigan). He made the Midget Major team at the age of fourteen when his teammates were two to three years older. In the 1984–85 season, Modano scored 50 goals and 50 assists on the way to win the USA Hockey National Championship in 1985. As a child Modano decided to pick the number 9 for his jersey in an homage to both Ted Williams, an idol of his Boston Red Sox fan father, and the Red Wings' own Gordie Howe.

== Playing career ==
=== Minor leagues (1986–1988) ===
In 1986, 16-year-old Modano was invited by coach Rick Wilson of the Prince Albert Raiders to come to Saskatchewan and join the Western Hockey League team. At his very first game, he scored a hat trick, and by his second year, Modano was part of the WHL All-Star Team. Four days after Modano's eighteenth birthday, the Minnesota North Stars selected him as the first overall draft pick in the 1988 NHL entry draft. Modano was the second American to be selected first overall in the draft, after Brian Lawton in 1983. Contract problems led Modano to play one more season with the Raiders.

=== Minnesota North Stars/Dallas Stars (1988–2010) ===
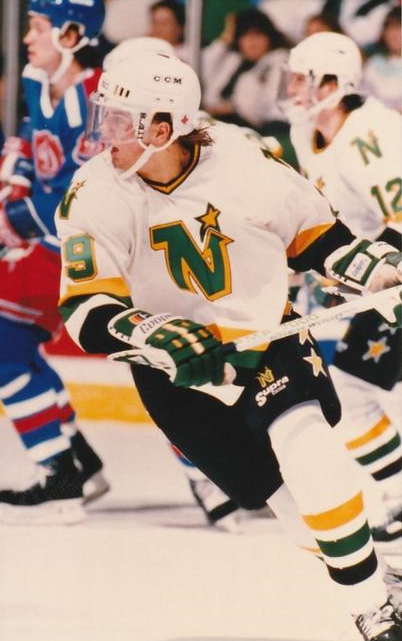
Modano with North Stars in 1989

The North Stars signed Modano on Christmas of 1988, and he joined the team for the 1989–90 season. He scored his first career NHL goal against Glenn Healy of the New York Islanders, and had a good rookie season which landed him on the NHL All-Rookie team. Modano was a finalist for the Calder Memorial Trophy but controversially lost to 31-year-old Sergei Makarov, who had already played professionally in the Soviet Championship League for over 12 years; this led to an age barrier of 26 for Calder candidates from the following year to the present.

Despite the good start, Modano was often criticized in Minnesota as an underachiever. This was evidenced by a sophomore season where the North Stars reached the 1991 Stanley Cup Final, but Modano's point production dropped, while confronting head coach Bob Gainey for his overtly defensive style. In 1992, Modano signed a four-year extension that made him the highest-paid member of the team, receiving $2 million per year. He soon had his best season up to that point, scoring 93 points at the 1992–93 NHL season and earning his first NHL All-Star Game invitation.

==== Stars move to Dallas ====
Prior to the 1993–94 NHL season, the North Stars moved to Dallas to become the Dallas Stars. Considering the relocation to Texas as an opportunity for a fresh start, with different expectations from fans and the media, Modano decided to accept Gainey's suggestions to become a more complete player and perform more attacks. Modano recorded a personal-best 50 goals and again scored 93 points. Soon he became an idol in Dallas, becoming the player who sold the most jerseys and received the most letters. During the next two seasons, Modano lowered his goalscoring and had many injuries – a concussion, a knee injury and ruptured ankle tendons – but improved his defensive play. Despite that, the Stars failed to qualify for the 1996 Stanley Cup playoffs, and Gainey stepped down as head coach, while remaining general manager.

Ken Hitchcock was hired on January 8, 1996, as the new head coach, installing a defensive-minded system while requesting Modano to concentrate on his offense and using him more routinely – instead of the 15–18 minutes he played under Gainey, Modano routinely played 25 minutes with Hitchcock. Helped by the acquisitions of Joe Nieuwendyk and Sergei Zubov, Modano led the Stars to the Central Division title in the 1996–97 season, but they lost in the opening round of the playoffs to the underdog Edmonton Oilers.

In the 1997–98 season, having acquired goaltender Ed Belfour, the Stars won the Presidents' Trophy with the league's top regular season record, edging out the New Jersey Devils. In the 1998 Stanley Cup playoffs the Stars defeated the San Jose Sharks in six games and the Edmonton Oilers in give games to reached the Western Conference Final where they fell in six games to the eventual back-to-back Stanley Cup champions, the Detroit Red Wings.

In the 1998-99 season, having signed Brett Hull, the Stars won their second straight Presidents' Trophy. The Stars swept the eighth seeded Edmonton Oilers, then defeated the fifth seeded St. Louis Blues in six games. In the Western Conference Final against the Colorado Avalanche, the Stars prevailed in seven games after falling behind in the series 3-2. In the Stanley Cup Final against the Buffalo Sabres, Modano played all six games of the series despite breaking his wrist in game two. Modano assisted on the Stars' final five goals of the series, including both in game five and game six, the latter by Brett Hull in the third overtime period which won the Stanley Cup for the Stars. Modano led the Stars with 23 points in the playoffs, with all seven in the finals on assists. During celebrations, Modano tossed his wrist cast into the crowd.

In the 1999-2000 season, the Stars captured their fourth straight Pacific Division title, although they only finished third in the Western Conference behind the St. Louis Blues and Detroit Red Wings. In the playoffs, the Stars eliminated the Edmonton Oilers and San Jose Sharks, winning each series in five games. In a rematch with the Colorado Avalanche which went to seven games, the Stars captured their second consecutive Western Conference title. The Stars returned to the finals in 2000 against the New Jersey Devils. In game two, Modano assisted on both goals by Hull to give the Stars a 2-1 victory, and in game five, he deflected Hull's shot to score the winning goal past Martin Brodeur in triple overtime. In game six in Dallas, Modano assisted on Mike Keane's game-tying goal, but the Devils scored in double overtime to win the series 4–2. Hull and Modano led the postseason in scoring, with Modano putting together 23 playoff points for the second straight year.

Modano averaged 78 points per season from 1996 to 2002, and was also one of the NHL's top forwards in plus/minus over that span (his +43 in 1997 was second only to John LeClair's +44 mark). Modano's career high for points in a game is six (2–4–6) against the Anaheim Ducks, and he has seven career hat tricks. His only career fight was against Rod Brind'Amour. He was also a finalist for the Frank J. Selke Trophy (2001), and the Lady Byng Trophy (2003). In 2002-03, Modano was named the captain of the Western Conference All-Star team.

==== 2005–2010 ====
As the long-time face of the Dallas franchise, he has recorded over 1,000 NHL points and became the captain of the Stars in 2003. During the 2005 offseason, Modano contemplated signing with the Boston Bruins, but he decided to stay with the Stars after owner Tom Hicks got involved. Modano would sign a five-year contract extension with Dallas on August 5, 2005. On September 29, 2006, Brenden Morrow replaced him as the Stars' captain; Modano served an alternate captain from that time until 2010, a role in which he had previously served from 1995 to 2003.

Modano scored his 500th career regular-season goal on March 13, 2007, with 10:24 left in the 3rd period in a regulation win against Antero Niittymäki of the Philadelphia Flyers with assists by Antti Miettinen and Jon Klemm. He is only the 14th goal scorer to score 500 goals with a single team and the 39th player to reach 500 goals overall.

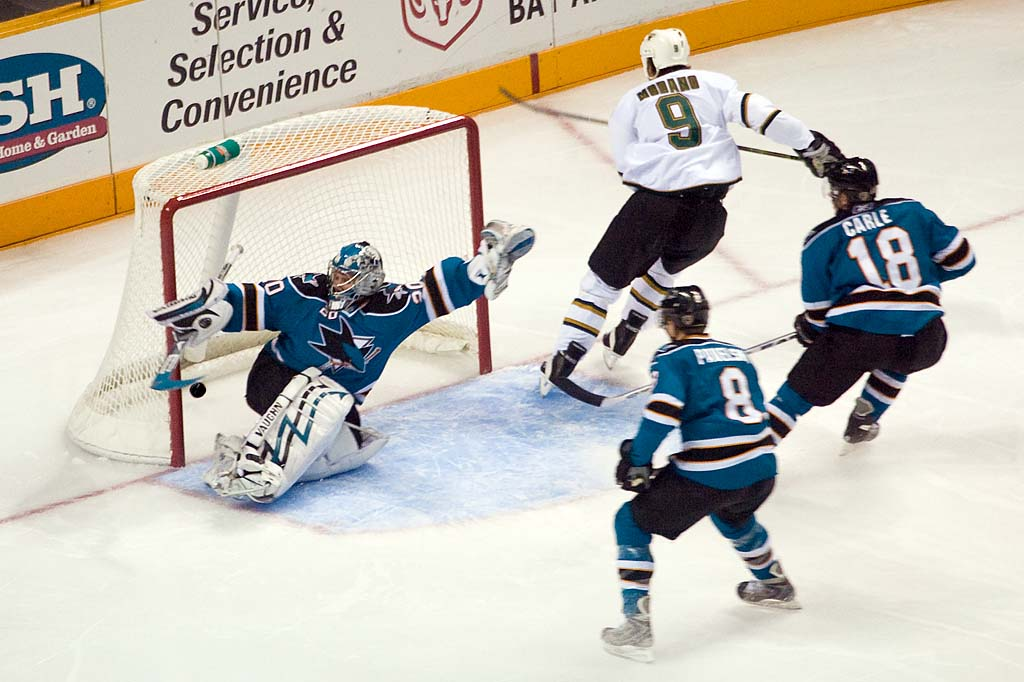
Modano's shorthanded, record breaking goal, November 7, 2007

On March 17, 2007, in an away game versus the Nashville Predators, Modano scored his 502nd and 503rd career regular-season goals in a 3–2 loss, thus passing Joe Mullen's NHL record (502) for most goals scored by an American-born player.

Modano also holds the NHL all-time record for most points scored by a U.S.-born player. He broke the record, which previously belonged to Phil Housley, on November 7, 2007, by scoring two goals in the first five minutes, with the record-breaker being a short-handed goal on a breakaway, against the San Jose Sharks. That night, amongst his congratulatory phone calls was one from Air Force One, U.S. President George W. Bush spoke to him for a few minutes about the record.

The Stars' game on November 21, 2007, was named "Mike Modano Tribute Night" at American Airlines Center, where Modano was honored by the franchise for his achievements in U.S. hockey. Those who spoke in the pre-game ceremony included Brett Hull, Joe Mullen, Phil Housley, and Stars owner Tom Hicks. Capping off an emotional night, Modano later went on to score the game-tying goal, as well as a shootout goal in a 3–2 Stars victory against the Anaheim Ducks.

The Stars had their deepest playoff run since 2000 during the 2008 Stanley Cup playoffs, when they eliminated the defending champions Anaheim Ducks, before being eliminated in the Conference Final by the eventual champions Detroit Red Wings. With his production declining from 2007 to 2010, Modano played out the duration of his contract, which expired after the 2009–10 season. Stars general manager Joe Nieuwendyk decided to let Modano leave the organization after 22 years with the franchise. Nieuwendyk stated that not offering Modano a new contract was a difficult choice, as he played with Modano and considered him a friend. In the final game of that season (coincidentally played in Minnesota, where Modano began his pro career), Modano was saluted with a video tribute and a standing ovation, and named the game's first star, skating around the ice wearing a Minnesota North Stars jersey.

=== Detroit Red Wings (2010–2011) ===
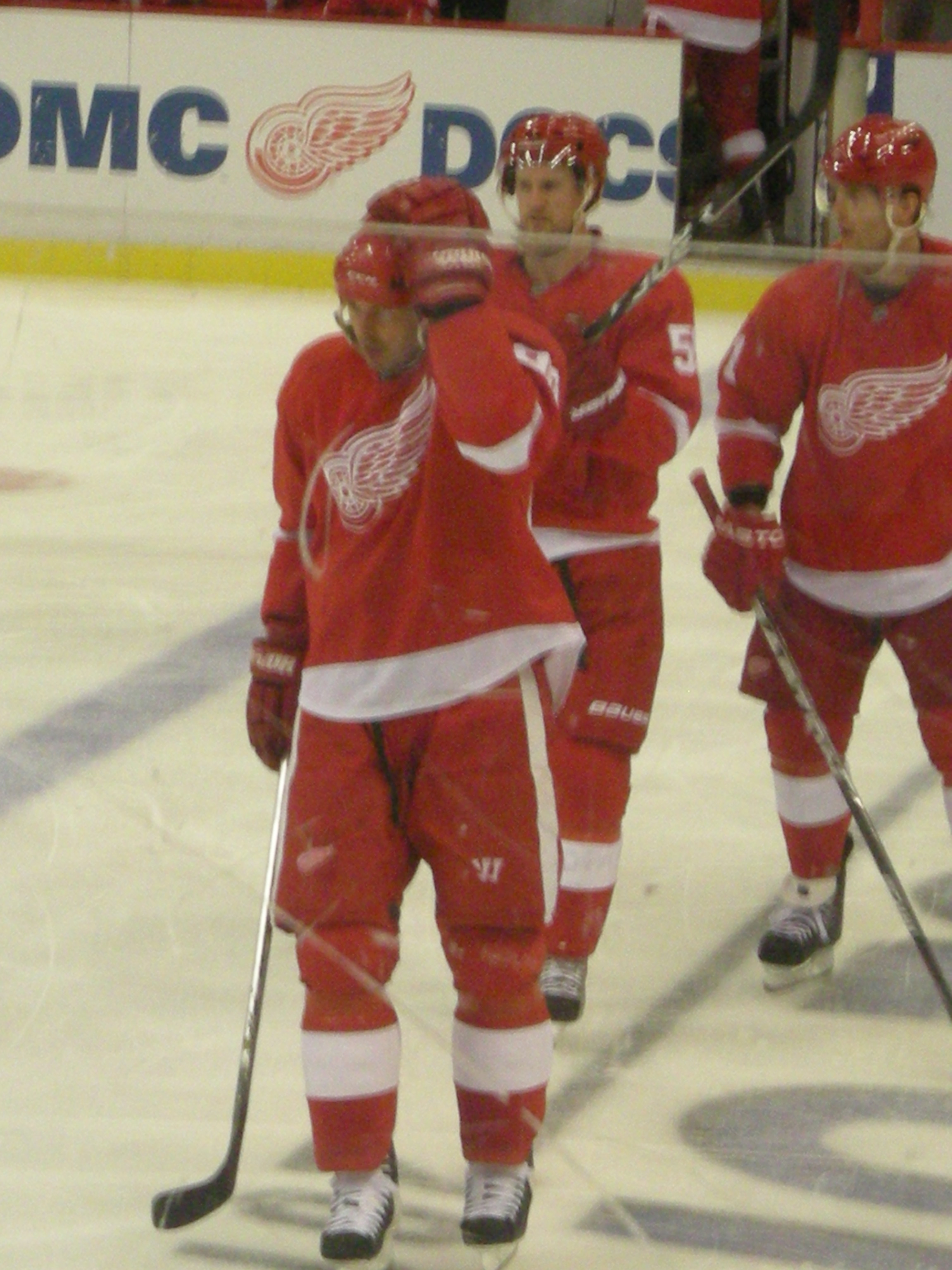
Modano with the Red Wings in October 2010

On June 29, 2010, the Stars announced that Modano would not be re-signed to a contract for the 2010–11 season. After contemplating retirement or signing with the Detroit Red Wings (in his home state) or with the Minnesota Wild (in the state where he began his NHL career), Modano signed a one-year contract with the Red Wings. As the no. 9 jersey had been retired by the Red Wings, Modano went for no. 90 instead. Coach Mike Babcock expressed a desire for Modano to center Detroit's third line with Dan Cleary and Jiří Hudler.

At 5:35 of the first period of Detroit's 2010–11 home opener, on just his second shift, Modano took a pass from Cleary and beat Anaheim goaltender Jonas Hiller for his first goal as a Red Wing.

Modano's time with the Red Wings ended on a sour note when Babcock made him a healthy scratch late in the season, even though the team had clinched a playoff berth, preventing him from reaching the milestone of 1,500 regular-season games played. Modano finished his career with 1,499 regular-season games played. Teammates Kris Draper and Nicklas Lidstrom were not pleased with Modano's benching which was an example of Babcock's coaching style which included "mind games". General manager Ken Holland has said in hindsight that if had he been aware of this snub, he would have intervened to have Modano play in order to reach the milestone. Modano retired after the Red Wings lost in the second round of the playoffs to the San Jose Sharks.

== Post-playing career ==
On September 23, 2011, after 21 seasons in the NHL, Modano officially announced his retirement from hockey at a press conference in Dallas. Modano was the last active player to have played in the 1980s, along with Mark Recchi, as well as the last active player to have played for the Minnesota North Stars. The Stars signed Modano to a one-day contract to allow Modano to retire as a Dallas Star. In January 2013, Modano became an alternate governor and executive advisor for the Stars' office. He described his role as regarding the "business side of the organization", attracting the involvement of local businesses to the team, as well as getting more fans to Stars games.

In May 2019, Modano was hired by the Minnesota Wild to serve as an executive advisor in the front office.

Modano is the founder and current Vice President of the Mike Modano Foundation, Inc., which raises awareness and funding for organizations offering education and assistance to children and families affected by child abuse, acts with canine rescue and has also united with the Wounded Warrior Project. Moreover, since the start of his NHL career, Modano has affiliated many times with both charitable organizations and the Texas community in general. He has also had his own clothing line during the 1990s.

Modano was one of a number of sportsmen to feature in a series of vignettes for WWF superstar Mr. Perfect, with Perfect playing as a goaltender saving every shot including Modano's.

Modano made a brief cameo appearance alongside then-teammate Basil McRae in the 1992 film The Mighty Ducks. Modano received a membership voucher to the Screen Actors Guild for the role.

In 2003, the town of Westland, where Modano lived during his minor hockey career and his parents still reside, renamed their ice rink as Mike Modano Ice Arena.

Hull and Modano ran a Dallas restaurant, Hully & Mo Restaurant and Tap Room, from 2008 to 2012.

Modano is an avid golfer, having met his second wife on a golf course, and playing in some tournaments after retirement. On Mike Modano Tribute Night, both the Dallas Stars and Anaheim Ducks organizations presented him with golf packages, one of which was for the course at The Royal and Ancient Golf Club of St Andrews in Scotland. His golf partner is often former Stars teammate Brett Hull. In the 2nd round of the 2021 American Century Celebrity Golf Championship on the 18th hole, Modano hit a double eagle (albatross) for the first time in the history of the event. The result of his shot going in gave him a tie for lead with John Smoltz going into the 3rd and final round.

== Legacy ==
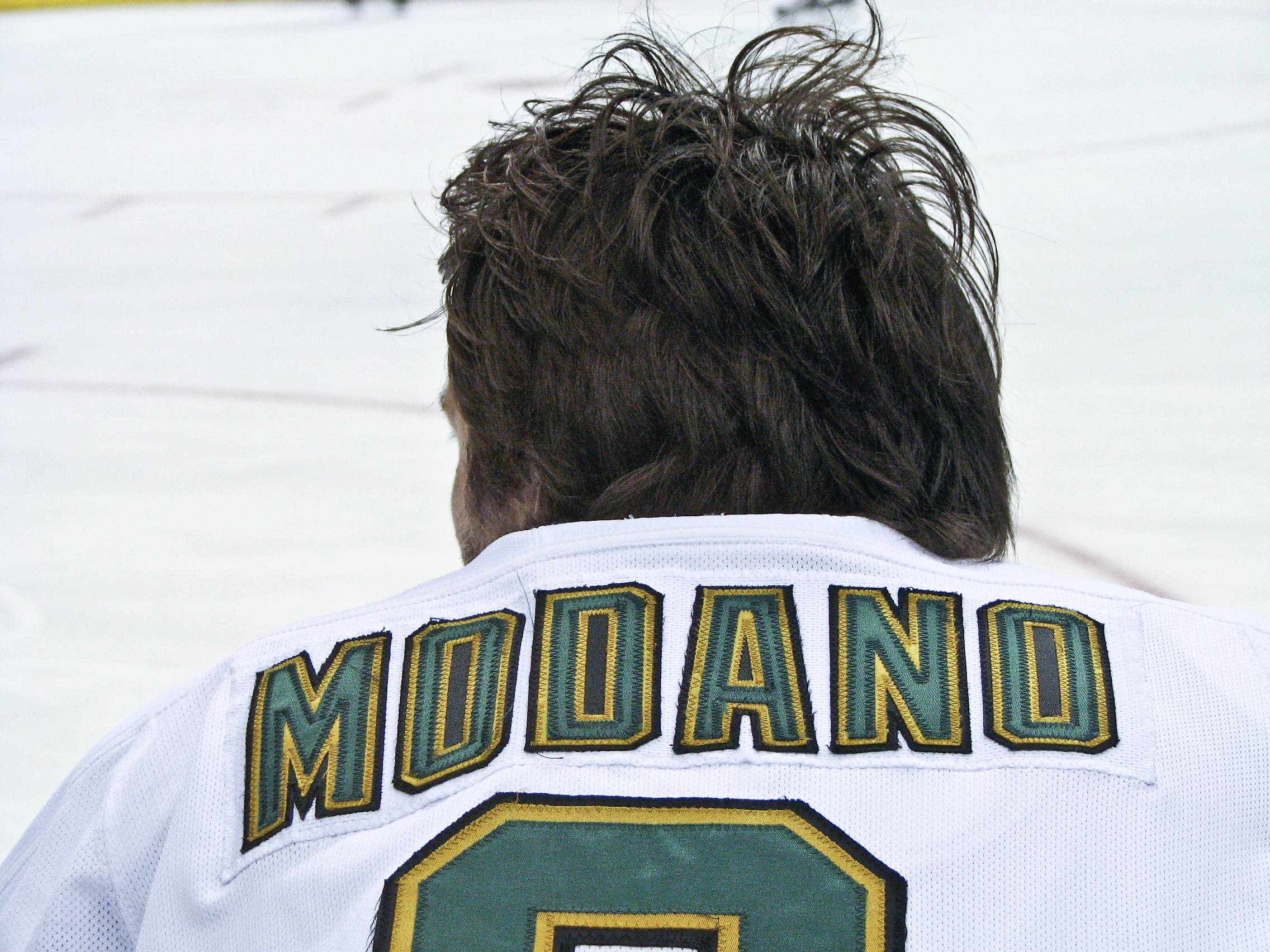
Modano in January 2008. His jersey was retired by the Dallas Stars in 2014, the same year he was inducted into the Hockey Hall of Fame.

Modano holds numerous records and accolades in NHL history, such as goals by a player born in the United States with 561, career playoff points by an American-born player with 146, and games played by an American-born forward with 1499. These achievements and others led to many peers and sportswriters regarding Modano as one of the greatest American-born ice hockey players of all time.

During his playing career, he was known for his speed, offensive instincts, scoring, puck-handling, and skating ability, and regarded for his well-rounded style of play and skillset.

On January 21, 2007, the NHL announced Modano as the Special Ambassador to the 2007 NHL All-Star Celebration, thanks to his numerous contributions towards bringing the 55th National Hockey League All-Star Game to Dallas and also for his contributions to Dallas hockey as a whole. Modano, the Stars' all-time leader in several statistical categories and a member of the franchise for the entirety of his 17-year career, appeared at selected All-Star events and dropped the puck in a ceremonial face-off prior the game on January 24, 2007.

Statue of Modano outside of American Airlines Center

On March 8, 2014, the Dallas Stars retired Modano's #9 jersey. At that time he was only the 4th player in franchise history to have that honor.

On November 17, 2014, Modano was inducted into the Hockey Hall of Fame.

For the 100th anniversary of the NHL in January 2017, Modano was named one of the 100 Greatest NHL Players, voted in by a panel of 58 people, including media members, NHL alumni and NHL executives.

In February 2019, Modano was inducted into the IIHF Hall of Fame.

In December 2022, The Athletic ranked Modano at #51 on its "NHL99" list of the 100 best players in modern NHL history.

The Dallas Stars unveiled a statue of Mike Modano at the American Airlines Center on March 16, 2024. The statue honoring Modano, designed by Omri Amrany, is located in the PNC Plaza outside of the arena, alongside one of Dallas Mavericks legend Dirk Nowitzki.

== Personal life ==
During his tenure with the Stars, Modano started dating Kerri Nelson, sister of his teammates Jeff and Todd Nelson. In October 1999, he proposed to her, but eventually they ended the engagement in February 2000.

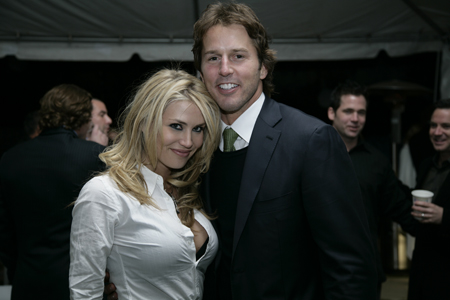
Modano and Willa Ford, 2007.

On November 30, 2006, singer/songwriter Willa Ford announced that Modano, her long-time boyfriend, had proposed to her during the weekend of Thanksgiving, 2006. Modano and Ford were married in a small ceremony in Athens, Texas, on August 25, 2007, where Brett Hull and Darryl Sydor attended as Modano's co-best men. Ford was asked by the NHL to blog the Stars' 2007 playoff series; her posts were well-received, and her support of her husband quite vocal. In August 2012, Ford and Modano announced that they were divorcing.

Modano married professional golfer Allison Micheletti, daughter and niece of former NHL players Joe Micheletti and Pat Micheletti, respectively, on September 1, 2013. They have twins (Jack and Kate), born in 2014 as well as a daughter, Reese (born 2016), son, Luca (born 2018), and daughter, Quinn (born 2020).

== Career achievements ==
=== Awards ===
- East First All-Star Team (WHL) – 1989
- NHL All-Rookie team – 1990
- NHL All-Star Games – 1993, 1998, 1999, 2000, 2003 (as the Western Conference team captain), 2004, 2007 (as the Special Ambassador), 2009
- Stanley Cup champion – 1999
- NHL second All-Star team – 2000
- Dallas Stars #9 jersey retired – 2014
- Hockey Hall of Fame Class of 2014
- Inducted into the IIHF Hall of Fame in 2019

=== Records ===
==== NHL ====
- Goals by a player born in the United States (561)
- Playoff points by an American-born player, career (146)
- Games played by an American-born forward (1499)
- Game-winning goals by an American-born player (92)

==== Minnesota North Stars/Dallas Stars ====
- Games played, regular season and playoffs (1459, 174)
- Goals, regular season and playoffs (557, 58)
- Assists, regular season and playoffs (802, 87)
- Points, regular season and playoffs (1359, 145)

== Career statistics ==
=== Regular season and playoffs ===
			Regular season					Playoffs
Season	Team	League	GP	G	A	Pts	PIM	GP	G	A	Pts	PIM
1985–86	Detroit Compuware	MNHL	69	66	65	131	32	—	—	—	—	—
1986–87	Prince Albert Raiders	WHL	70	32	30	62	96	8	1	4	5	4
1987–88	Prince Albert Raiders	WHL	65	47	80	127	80	9	7	11	18	18
1988–89	Prince Albert Raiders	WHL	41	39	66	105	74	—	—	—	—	—
1988–89	Minnesota North Stars	NHL	—	—	—	—	—	2	0	0	0	0
1989–90	Minnesota North Stars	NHL	80	29	46	75	63	7	1	1	2	12
1990–91	Minnesota North Stars	NHL	79	28	36	64	65	23	8	12	20	6
1991–92	Minnesota North Stars	NHL	76	33	44	77	46	7	3	2	5	4
1992–93	Minnesota North Stars	NHL	82	33	60	93	83	—	—	—	—	—
1993–94	Dallas Stars	NHL	76	50	43	93	54	9	7	3	10	16
1994–95	Dallas Stars	NHL	30	12	17	29	8	—	—	—	—	—
1995–96	Dallas Stars	NHL	78	36	45	81	63	—	—	—	—	—
1996–97	Dallas Stars	NHL	80	35	48	83	42	7	4	1	5	0
1997–98	Dallas Stars	NHL	52	21	38	59	32	17	4	10	14	12
1998–99	Dallas Stars	NHL	77	34	47	81	44	23	5	18	23	16
1999–2000	Dallas Stars	NHL	77	38	43	81	48	23	10	13	23	10
2000–01	Dallas Stars	NHL	81	33	51	84	52	9	3	4	7	0
2001–02	Dallas Stars	NHL	78	34	43	77	38	—	—	—	—	—
2002–03	Dallas Stars	NHL	79	28	57	85	30	12	5	10	15	4
2003–04	Dallas Stars	NHL	76	14	30	44	46	5	1	2	3	8
2005–06	Dallas Stars	NHL	78	27	50	77	58	5	1	3	4	4
2006–07	Dallas Stars	NHL	59	22	21	43	34	7	1	1	2	4
2007–08	Dallas Stars	NHL	82	21	36	57	48	18	5	7	12	22
2008–09	Dallas Stars	NHL	80	15	31	46	46	—	—	—	—	—
2009–10	Dallas Stars	NHL	59	14	16	30	22	—	—	—	—	—
2010–11	Detroit Red Wings	NHL	40	4	11	15	8	2	0	1	1	0
NHL totals			1,499	561	813	1,374	926	176	58	88	146	128

=== International ===
Medal record

Men's ice hockey

Representing the United States

World Cup
Gold medal – first place	1996	

Olympic Games
Silver medal – second place	2002 Salt Lake City	Ice hockey

Year	Team	Event	GP	G	A	Pts	PIM
1988	United States	WJC	7	4	1	5	8
1989	United States	WJC	7	6	9	15	12
1990	United States	WC	8	3	3	6	2
1991	United States	CC	8	2	7	9	2
1993	United States	WC	6	0	0	0	2
1996	United States	WCH	7	2	4	6	4
1998	United States	OG	4	2	0	2	0
2002	United States	OG	6	0	6	6	4
2004	United States	WCH	5	1	5	6	0
2005	United States	WC	7	3	1	4	4
2006	United States	OG	6	2	0	2	6
Senior totals			57	15	26	41	24

== See also ==
- List of NHL statistical leaders
- List of NHL players with 1,000 games played
- List of NHL players with 1,000 points
- List of NHL players with 500 goals
- List of first overall NHL draft picks

Preceded by Pierre Turgeon	NHL first overall draft pick 1988	Succeeded by Mats Sundin
Preceded by Dave Archibald	Minnesota North Stars first-round draft pick 1988	Succeeded by Doug Zmolek
Preceded by Derian Hatcher	Dallas Stars captain 2003–2006	Succeeded by Brenden Morrow
