= Rhett Warrener =

Canadian ice hockey player (born 1976)

- Born: January 27, 1976 (age 50) Shaunavon, Saskatchewan, Canada
- Height: 6 ft 2 in (188 cm)
- Weight: 217 lb (98 kg; 15 st 7 lb)
- Position: Defence
- Shot: Right
- Played for: Buffalo Sabres; Florida Panthers; Calgary Flames
- NHL draft: 27th overall, 1994; Florida Panthers
- Playing career: 1995–2009

Medal record

Representing Canada

Men's ice hockey

Pacific Cup
| Bronze medal – third place | 1993 Japan | |

World Junior Championships
| Gold medal – first place | 1996 United States | |

Rhett Adam Warrener (born January 27, 1976) is a Canadian former professional ice hockey defenceman who played over 700 games in the National Hockey League (NHL) for the Florida Panthers, Buffalo Sabres and Calgary Flames between 1995 and 2008. He was a member of the Canadian national junior team that won a gold medal at the 1996 World Junior Championship. Warrener retired in 2009 after missing a full season due to a shoulder injury. He briefly remained with the Flames as a scout before turning to broadcasting. Warrener was born in Shaunavon, Saskatchewan, but grew up in Frontier, Saskatchewan.

== Playing career ==
=== Junior ===
Warrener played his junior hockey with the Saskatoon Blades of the Western Hockey League (WHL). They selected him with their first selection, fifth overall, in the 1991 WHL Bantam Draft. He appeared in two WHL games in 1991–92 before joining the Blades full-time in 1992–93. Warrener was named the team's rookie of the year that season after recording 19 points in 68 games. He made his first appearance with the national team in the summer of 1993, joining the under-18 team for the 1993 Pacific Cup. Warrener appeared in five games for the bronze medal winning Canadians.

Following a 1993–94 season in which Warrener scored 26 points and recorded 131 penalty minutes, the Florida Panthers selected him with their second round selection, 27th overall, at the 1994 NHL entry draft. He played a third full season in the WHL in 1994–95, scoring 39 points and recording 137 penalty minutes in 66 games.

=== Professional ===
Warrener joined the Panthers for the 1995–96 season and made his NHL debut on October 17, 1995, against the New Jersey Devils. He appeared in 28 regular season games for Florida, tallying three assists, and played in nine more for the American Hockey League's Carolina Monarchs. He appeared in 21 additional games in the 1996 Stanley Cup Playoffs as the Panthers reached the Stanley Cup Finals, losing to the Colorado Avalanche. During the season, the Panthers released Warrener to the Canadian national junior team for the 1996 World Junior Ice Hockey Championships. He appeared in six games, recording four penalty minutes, and won a gold medal as Canada defeated Sweden for the championship.

Establishing himself as a regular defenceman in the Panthers lineup, Warrener appeared in 62 games in 1996–97. He scored his first NHL goal on January 23, 1997, against Boston Bruins' goaltender Rob Tallas and finished the season with 4 goals and 13 points. He appeared in a career high 79 games in 1997–98, recording four assists, and had seven assists in 44 games in 1998–99 when the Panthers traded him. Warrener was sent to the Buffalo Sabres, along with a draft pick, for Mike Wilson on March 23, 1999. The Sabres reached the 1999 Stanley Cup Finals, losing to the Dallas Stars in the sixth game of the series. Like many of that year's Sabres players, Warrener believes Brett Hull's controversial Cup clinching goal should not have counted given Hull's foot was in the goal crease in apparent violation of the rules of the time. Warrener was one of the top defencemen of the playoffs; his plus-minus of +12 was the third best total of the post-season.

Warrener led the Sabres' defence with a +18 rating in 1999–2000. He again led the defence with a +10 in 2000–01 and set a career high with 19 points. The Sabres named him the recipient of their Tim Horton Memorial Award as the team's "unsung hero" Warrener's five goals and 113 penalty minutes in 2001–02 were both career highs. He was limited to 50 games in 2002–03 after missing time with a broken foot, concussion, abdominal strain and inner-ear imbalance.

The Calgary Flames acquired Warrener, along with Steve Reinprecht in exchange for Chris Drury and Steve Bégin on July 3, 2003. He appeared in 77 games in 2003–04, scoring three goals and 17 points, and appeared in his 500th NHL game on November 22, 2003, against the Chicago Blackhawks. He added an assist in 24 playoff games as the Flames reached the 2004 Stanley Cup Finals. Warrener was considered one of the team's best defenders; head coach Darryl Sutter said he was the Flames' most underrated players and was influential in helping the team reach the playoffs for the first time in eight seasons. It was the third time he reached the final in his first season with a team, but he again fell short of winning the championship as the Flames were defeated for the Cup in seven games by the Tampa Bay Lightning.

After missing the 2004–05 season due to a labour stoppage, Warrener scored 6 points in 61 games in 2005–06 but again missed significant time to injuries. Named an alternate captain in 2006–07, he appeared in 62 games, scoring ten points. Warrener missed the majority of the 2007–08 season with a variety of injuries, including a broken leg along with ankle and throat injuries. Consequently, the Flames placed Warrener on waivers prior to the 2008–09 season, intending to remove him from the team roster. Instead, he was placed on injured reserve following shoulder surgery. While he hoped to return to the Flames' lineup at some point during the season, but ultimately missed the entire season. Realizing his shoulder remained too weak, Warrener announced his retirement following the season but remained with the Flames as a scout.

== Personal life ==
Heavily involved in the community, Warrener was recognized by the Flames on several occasions for his charitable endeavours. He purchased a luxury suite to bring kids otherwise unable to attend to Flames and Calgary Hitmen games and supported numerous community charities, including the Alberta Children's Hospital and KidSport. The team named him winner of the Ralph T. Scurfield Humanitarian Award as the Flames' player who "best exemplifies the qualities of perseverance, determination and leadership on the ice, combined with dedication to community service" in both 2006 and 2007. Additionally, he was named the team's nominee for the 2008 King Clancy Memorial Trophy leadership on and off the ice.

Warrener, who was born in Shaunavon, Saskatchewan, and his wife Christina, a native of Buffalo, continue to live in Calgary. The couple have two sons. Unsatisfied in his role as a scout, Warrener left the game for a time. He returned to the sport as a broadcaster, appearing as an intermission panelist for the team's television broadcasts and joining Sportsnet 960 radio for a weekly segment called "Warrener Wednesdays". He parlayed his weekly guest spot into a daily co-host position on the station's morning show. As a co-host Warrener made a strong impact in the Calgary community supporting many charity events. In spring 2019 he decided to leave radio in order to rejoin the Flames organization in a player development role.

Starting in October 2024, Rhett, along with his former Sportsnet 960 colleagues, Dean "Boomer" Molberg and Ryan Pinder started their own podcast which is part of the Nation Network called Barn Burner.

Along with Mike Commodore, he played a role in Paul Brandt's music video, "Convoy", as a truck driver.

== Career statistics ==
=== Regular season and playoffs ===
| | | | Regular season | | | | | Playoffs |
| Season | Team | League | GP | G | A | Pts | PIM | GP | G | A | Pts | PIM |
|---|---|---|---|---|---|---|---|---|---|---|---|---|
| 1991–92 | Saskatoon Blades | WHL | 2 | 0 | 0 | 0 | 0 | — | — | — | — | — |
| 1992–93 | Saskatoon Blades | WHL | 68 | 2 | 17 | 19 | 100 | 9 | 0 | 0 | 0 | 14 |
| 1993–94 | Saskatoon Blades | WHL | 61 | 7 | 19 | 26 | 131 | 16 | 0 | 5 | 5 | 33 |
| 1994–95 | Saskatoon Blades | WHL | 66 | 13 | 26 | 39 | 137 | 10 | 0 | 3 | 3 | 6 |
| 1995–96 | Carolina Monarchs | AHL | 9 | 0 | 0 | 0 | 4 | — | — | — | — | — |
| 1995–96 | Florida Panthers | NHL | 28 | 0 | 3 | 3 | 46 | 21 | 0 | 3 | 3 | 10 |
| 1996–97 | Florida Panthers | NHL | 62 | 4 | 9 | 13 | 88 | 5 | 0 | 0 | 0 | 0 |
| 1997–98 | Florida Panthers | NHL | 79 | 0 | 4 | 4 | 99 | — | — | — | — | — |
| 1998–99 | Florida Panthers | NHL | 48 | 0 | 7 | 7 | 64 | — | — | — | — | — |
| 1998–99 | Buffalo Sabres | NHL | 13 | 1 | 0 | 1 | 20 | 20 | 1 | 3 | 4 | 32 |
| 1999–00 | Buffalo Sabres | NHL | 61 | 0 | 3 | 3 | 89 | 5 | 0 | 0 | 0 | 2 |
| 2000–01 | Buffalo Sabres | NHL | 77 | 3 | 16 | 19 | 78 | 13 | 0 | 2 | 2 | 4 |
| 2001–02 | Buffalo Sabres | NHL | 65 | 5 | 5 | 10 | 113 | — | — | — | — | — |
| 2002–03 | Buffalo Sabres | NHL | 50 | 0 | 9 | 9 | 63 | — | — | — | — | — |
| 2003–04 | Calgary Flames | NHL | 77 | 3 | 14 | 17 | 97 | 24 | 0 | 1 | 1 | 6 |
| 2005–06 | Calgary Flames | NHL | 61 | 3 | 3 | 6 | 54 | 7 | 0 | 0 | 0 | 14 |
| 2006–07 | Calgary Flames | NHL | 62 | 4 | 6 | 10 | 67 | 6 | 0 | 0 | 0 | 10 |
| 2007–08 | Calgary Flames | NHL | 31 | 1 | 3 | 4 | 21 | — | — | — | — | — |
| NHL totals | | | 714 | 24 | 82 | 106 | 899 | 101 | 1 | 9 | 10 | 78 |

=== International ===
| Year | Team | Event | GP | G | A | Pts | PIM |
|---|---|---|---|---|---|---|---|
| 1993 | Canada | PC | 5 | 0 | 0 | 0 | 0 |
| 1996 | Canada | WJC | 6 | 0 | 0 | 0 | 4 |
| Junior totals | | | 11 | 0 | 0 | 0 | 4 |

== Honours and awards ==
| Award | Year |
|---|---|
Team awards
| Tim Horton Memorial Award; Buffalo Sabres' unsung hero | 2000–01 |
| Ralph T. Scurfield Humanitarian Award; Calgary Flames player who exemplifies leadership and community service | 2005–06; 2006–07 |
