= Derian Hatcher =

American ice hockey player (born 1972)

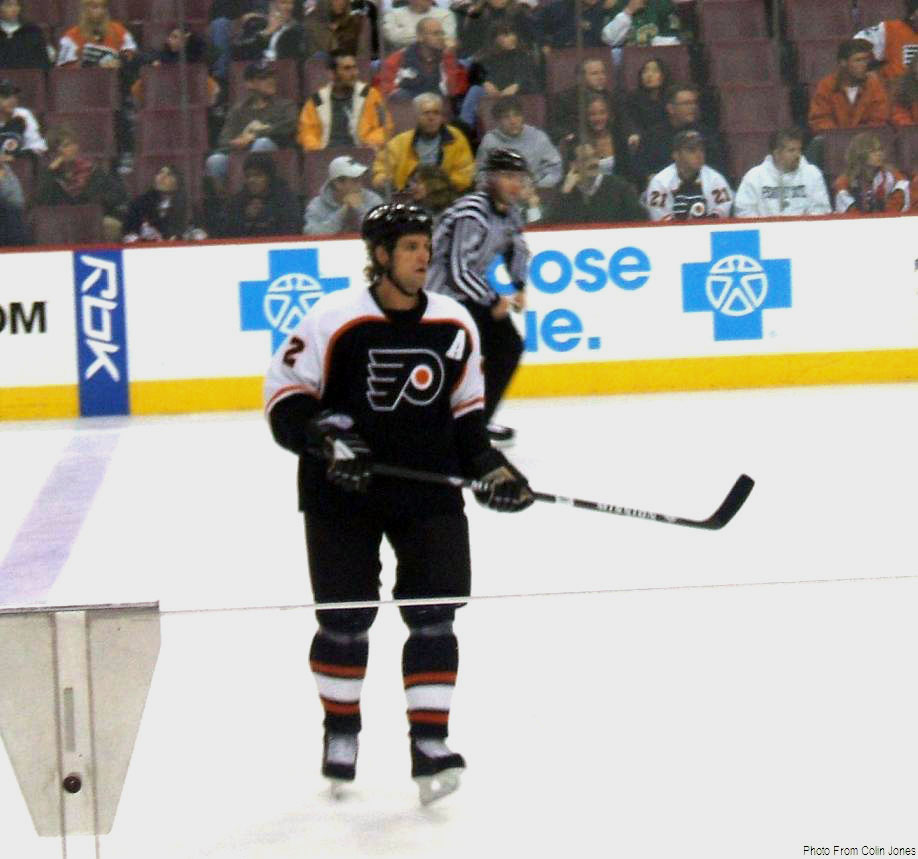
- Hatcher with the Philadelphia Flyers in 2007
- Born: June 4, 1972 (age 54) Sterling Heights, Michigan, U.S.
- Height: 6 ft 5 in (196 cm)
- Weight: 245 lb (111 kg; 17 st 7 lb)
- Position: Defense
- Shot: Left
- Played for: Minnesota North Stars; Dallas Stars; Detroit Red Wings; Philadelphia Flyers
- National team: United States
- NHL draft: 8th overall, 1990; Minnesota North Stars
- Playing career: 1991–2008

Derian John Hatcher (born June 4, 1972) is an American former professional ice hockey defenseman who played 16 seasons in the National Hockey League (NHL) with the Minnesota North Stars, Dallas Stars, Detroit Red Wings, and Philadelphia Flyers. He is the current owner of the Sarnia Sting of the Ontario Hockey League (OHL).

He is the younger brother of former NHL player Kevin Hatcher, with whom he was inducted into the United States Hockey Hall of Fame on October 21, 2010. In 2014, Hatcher and David Legwand, a fellow OHL alumnus, NHL player and Michigan native, purchased and became co-owners of the Sarnia Sting, with Hatcher serving as head coach from 2015 to 2020.

== Playing career ==
As a youth, Hatcher played in the 1985 and 1986 Quebec International Pee-Wee Hockey Tournaments with the Detroit Compuware minor ice hockey team.

Hatcher was known as a physical defenseman and a strong bodychecker and used his intimidating size to good effect. He was drafted in the 1st round as the eighth overall selection by the Minnesota North Stars in the 1990 NHL entry draft and scored in his NHL debut game on October 12, 1991. Hatcher played for the North Stars and went with them when they moved to Dallas in 1993. He was named captain during the 1994-95 season.

Hatcher played another ten years for the Dallas Stars, collecting 71 goals, 223 assists, 1,380 penalty minutes, and captained the Stars to the Stanley Cup in 1999. In doing so, he became the first American-born captain to win the Stanley Cup. Hatcher was the longest-serving captain in franchise history before being matched and surpassed by Jamie Benn. In July 2003, Hatcher signed with the Detroit Red Wings on a five-year, $30 million contract. A knee injury (torn ligament) in just the third game of the season forced Hatcher to miss most of the year, playing in just 15 regular season games with the Red Wings.

In 2004, due to the cancellation of the NHL season, Hatcher, along with fellow Detroit Red Wings teammates Chris Chelios and Kris Draper, decided to play minor league hockey with the Motor City Mechanics based out of Fraser, Michigan.

On August 2, 2005, Hatcher signed a four year deal for $14 million with the Philadelphia Flyers after his contract with Detroit ($4.9 million) was bought out due to the new salary cap.

On January 29, 2006, Hatcher was named interim captain of the Flyers. He served as captain for the rest of the 2005–06 season due to the absence of injured captain Keith Primeau. Hatcher has also served as an alternate captain for the Flyers.

Suffering from a right knee injury, he missed the entire 2008–09 NHL season. Hatcher later returned as a "co-coach" for the playoffs. After having replacement surgery on the same knee in June 2009, Hatcher said that he would most likely not return to playing hockey. On June 15, 2009, Hatcher formally announced his retirement from the NHL, done so with the Dallas Stars. He remained in the Flyers organization as a player development coach, taking a job vacated by another former Flyer defenseman and captain, Éric Desjardins, who resigned to pursue business interests.

== Awards ==
- Played in NHL All-Star Game - 1997
- 1999 Stanley Cup champion
- NHL Second All-Star Team - 2003
- Inducted into the United States Hockey Hall of Fame - 2010

== Personal life ==
Hatcher and his brother Kevin, also a former NHL player, previously owned a bar/restaurant in Utica, Michigan.

In 2015, Hatcher, along with David Legwand, purchased the OHL's Sarnia Sting. Hatcher served as head coach of the team, with Legwand as an assistant coach, from 2015 to 2021.

== Career statistics ==
=== Regular season and playoffs ===
			Regular season					Playoffs
Season	Team	League	GP	G	A	Pts	PIM	GP	G	A	Pts	PIM
1987–88	Detroit G. P. D. Midgets	MNHL	25	5	13	18	52	—	—	—	—	—
1988–89	Detroit G. P. D. Midgets	MNHL	51	19	35	54	100	—	—	—	—	—
1989–90	North Bay Centennials	OHL	64	14	38	52	45	5	2	3	5	8
1990–91	North Bay Centennials	OHL	64	13	50	63	163	10	2	10	12	28
1991–92	Minnesota North Stars	NHL	43	7	5	12	88	5	0	2	2	8
1991–92	Kalamazoo Wings	IHL	2	1	2	3	21	—	—	—	—	—
1992–93	Minnesota North Stars	NHL	67	4	15	19	178	—	—	—	—	—
1993–94	Dallas Stars	NHL	83	12	19	31	211	9	0	2	2	14
1994–95	Dallas Stars	NHL	43	5	11	16	105	—	—	—	—	—
1995–96	Dallas Stars	NHL	79	8	23	31	129	—	—	—	—	—
1996–97	Dallas Stars	NHL	63	3	19	22	97	7	0	2	2	20
1997–98	Dallas Stars	NHL	70	6	25	31	132	17	3	3	6	39
1998–99	Dallas Stars	NHL	80	9	21	30	102	18	1	6	7	24
1999–2000	Dallas Stars	NHL	57	2	22	24	68	23	1	3	4	29
2000–01	Dallas Stars	NHL	80	2	21	23	77	10	0	1	1	16
2001–02	Dallas Stars	NHL	80	4	21	25	87	—	—	—	—	—
2002–03	Dallas Stars	NHL	82	8	22	30	106	11	1	2	3	33
2003–04	Detroit Red Wings	NHL	15	0	4	4	8	12	0	1	1	15
2004–05	Motor City Mechanics	UHL	24	5	12	17	27	—	—	—	—	—
2005–06	Philadelphia Flyers	NHL	77	4	13	17	93	6	0	2	2	10
2006–07	Philadelphia Flyers	NHL	82	3	6	9	67	—	—	—	—	—
2007–08	Philadelphia Flyers	NHL	44	2	5	7	33	15	1	2	3	40
NHL totals			1,045	80	251	331	1,581	133	7	26	33	248

=== International ===
Year	Team	Event	GP	G	A	Pts	PIM
1993	United States	WC	6	1	2	3	8
1996	United States	WCH	6	3	2	5	10
1998	United States	OG	4	0	0	0	0
2002	United States	WC	7	0	1	1	0
2006	United States	OG	6	0	0	0	12
Senior totals			29	4	5	9	30

== See also ==
- Notable families in the NHL
- List of NHL players with 1,000 games played

Preceded by Doug Zmolek	Minnesota North Stars first-round draft pick 1990	Succeeded by Richard Matvichuk
Preceded by Neal Broten	Dallas Stars captain 1995–2003	Succeeded by Mike Modano
Preceded by Keith Primeau	Philadelphia Flyers captain 2006 (while Primeau was injured)	Succeeded by Peter Forsberg
