= Richard Šmehlík =

Czech ice hockey player

- Born: 23 January 1970 (age 56) Ostrava, Czechoslovakia
- Height: 6 ft 4 in (193 cm)
- Weight: 222 lb (101 kg; 15 st 12 lb)
- Position: Defence
- Shot: Left
- Played for: Buffalo Sabres; Atlanta Thrashers; New Jersey Devils
- National team: Czech Republic
- NHL draft: 97th overall, 1990; Buffalo Sabres
- Playing career: 1988–2003

Olympic medal record

Men's Ice Hockey
Gold medal – first place	1998 Nagano	Ice Hockey
Bronze medal – third place	1992 Albertville	Team

Richard Šmehlík (born 23 January 1970) is a Czech former professional ice hockey defenceman who played in the National Hockey League (NHL). He was drafted in the fifth round, 97th overall, by the Buffalo Sabres in the 1990 NHL entry draft.

Šmehlík joined the Sabres for the 1992–93 season, and played there for nine seasons. He left via free agency for the Atlanta Thrashers before the 2002–03 season.

At the trade deadline of the 2002–03 season, Šmehlík was traded to the New Jersey Devils in exchange for a draft pick. Šmehlík would go on to win the Stanley Cup that season with the Devils. He retired following the season.

In his NHL career, Šmehlík appeared in 644 games, tallying 49 goals and adding 146 assists. He also appeared in 88 playoff games, scoring 1 goal and recording 14 assists.

== Awards ==
- Bronze Medal at 1992 Winter Olympics (with Czechoslovakia)
- Gold Medal at 1998 Winter Olympics (with Czech Republic)
- 2003 Stanley Cup champion (with New Jersey Devils)

== Trivia ==
- The draft pick the Sabres used to select Šmehlík was acquired from the New York Rangers in exchange for Lindy Ruff. Ruff would later become the Sabres' head coach, and Šmehlík would play under him for five seasons.
- Richard and his wife, Martina, have two daughters: Adela and Jessica.
- Šmehlík appears on the cover of the Czech version of the NHL 2000 video game.
- During the 1999 Stanley Cup Final he was described as "like a human hovercraft... hard to get around!"

== Career statistics ==
=== Regular season and playoffs ===
			Regular season					Playoffs
Season	Team	League	GP	G	A	Pts	PIM	GP	G	A	Pts	PIM
1987–88	TJ Vítkovice	CSSR Jr	—	—	—	—	—	—	—	—	—	—
1987–88	TJ Vítkovice	CSSR-2	—	—	—	—	—	—	—	—	—	—
1988–89	TJ Vítkovice	CSSR	28	2	3	5	12	—	—	—	—	—
1989–90	TJ Vítkovice	CSSR	44	4	3	7	—	7	1	1	2	—
1990–91	ASD Dukla Jihlava	CSSR	51	4	2	6	22	7	0	1	1	0
1991–92	TJ Vítkovice	CSSR	35	8	5	13	—	—	—	—	—	—
1992–93	Buffalo Sabres	NHL	80	4	27	31	59	8	0	4	4	2
1993–94	Buffalo Sabres	NHL	84	14	27	41	69	7	0	2	2	10
1994–95	HC Vítkovice	CZE	13	5	2	7	12	—	—	—	—	—
1994–95	Buffalo Sabres	NHL	39	4	7	11	46	5	0	0	0	2
1996–97	Buffalo Sabres	NHL	62	11	19	30	43	12	0	2	2	4
1997–98	Buffalo Sabres	NHL	72	3	17	20	62	15	0	2	2	6
1998–99	Buffalo Sabres	NHL	72	3	11	14	44	21	0	3	3	10
1999–00	Buffalo Sabres	NHL	64	2	9	11	50	5	1	0	1	0
2000–01	Buffalo Sabres	NHL	56	3	12	15	4	10	0	1	1	4
2001–02	Buffalo Sabres	NHL	60	3	6	9	22	—	—	—	—	—
2002–03	Atlanta Thrashers	NHL	43	2	9	11	16	—	—	—	—	—
2002–03	New Jersey Devils	NHL	12	0	2	2	0	5	0	0	0	2
CSSR totals			158	18	13	31	—	14	1	2	3	—
NHL totals			644	49	146	195	415	88	1	14	15	40

=== International ===
Year	Team	Event	GP	G	A	Pts	PIM
1988	Czechoslovakia	EJC	5	1	1	2	4
1990	Czechoslovakia	WJC	7	0	1	1	4
1991	Czechoslovakia	CC	5	0	1	1	2
1991	Czechoslovakia	WC	8	1	2	3	8
1992	Czechoslovakia	OG	6	0	1	1	2
1992	Czechoslovakia	WC	8	0	0	0	4
1998	Czech Republic	OG	6	0	1	1	4
2002	Czech Republic	OG	4	0	0	0	4
Junior totals			12	1	2	3	8
Senior totals			37	1	5	6	24
