= Sergei Zubov =

Russian ice hockey player (born 1970)

- Hockey Hall of Fame, 2019
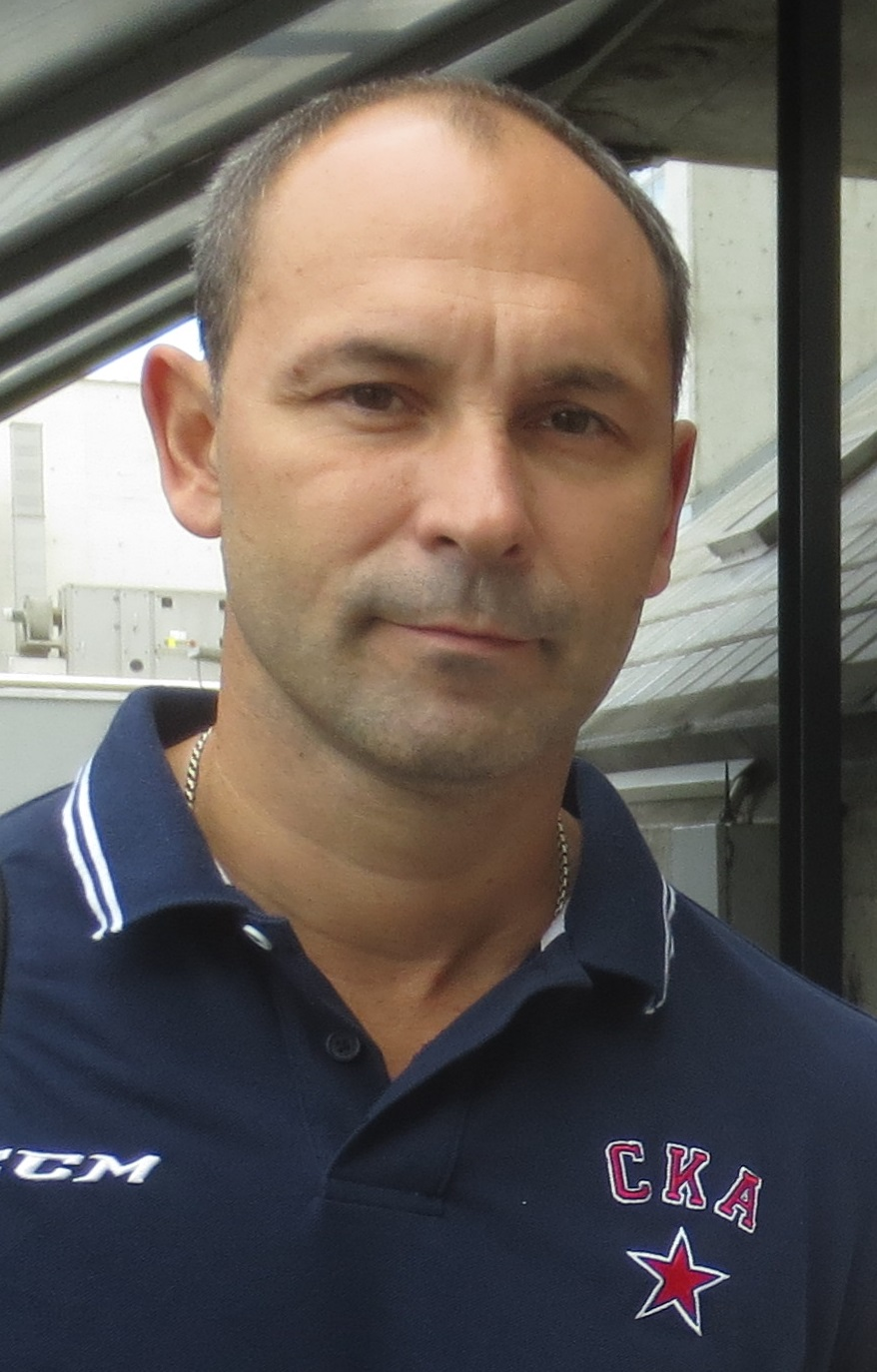
- Zubov in 2014
- Born: 22 July 1970 (age 56) Moscow, Russian SFSR, Soviet Union
- Height: 6 ft 1 in (185 cm)
- Weight: 198 lb (90 kg; 14 st 2 lb)
- Position: Defence
- Shot: Right
- Played for: CSKA Moscow; New York Rangers; Pittsburgh Penguins; Dallas Stars; SKA Saint Petersburg
- Current KHL coach: HC Sochi
- National team: Soviet Union, Unified Team and Russia
- NHL draft: 85th overall, 1990; New York Rangers
- Playing career: 1988–2010
- Coaching career: 2011–present

Sergei Alexandrovich Zubov (Russian: Сергей Александрович Зубов; born 22 July 1970) is a Russian professional ice hockey coach and former defenceman. Zubov played for the Dallas Stars, New York Rangers and Pittsburgh Penguins of the National Hockey League (NHL) as well as SKA Saint Petersburg of the KHL. He won the Stanley Cup twice: with the Rangers in 1994 and the Stars in 1999. He was inducted into the Hockey Hall of Fame as part of the class of 2019.

== Playing career ==
=== CSKA Moscow, New York Rangers and Pittsburgh Penguins ===
Zubov was drafted in the fifth round of the 1990 NHL entry draft by the New York Rangers. Prior to this, he played for the Red Army's hockey team, HC CSKA Moscow, in Russia. He continued to play for the Red Army until 1992, after the dissolution of the Soviet Union. Although Sergei spent some of his rookie season with New York's AHL affiliate, the Binghamton Rangers, he played forty-nine games as a rookie for the Rangers, scoring 31 points, considered then to be above-average for a defenseman. Zubov's high-scoring ways continued, as he scored 12 goals and earned 77 assists during the 1993–94 season, which led the team in regular season scoring. He contributed 19 points to the Rangers' playoff campaign, as he, along with Alexander Karpovtsev, Sergei Nemchinov, and Alexei Kovalev became the first Russians to have their names engraved on the Stanley Cup.

Zubov continued to play well for the Rangers, but on 31 August 1995, he was traded to the Pittsburgh Penguins with Petr Nedvěd for Ulf Samuelsson and Luc Robitaille. Zubov only spent one season in Pittsburgh, it was rumored because he and team captain Mario Lemieux didn't get along, especially on the powerplay where both men wanted to be in control. He was traded to the Dallas Stars on 22 June 1996 for Kevin Hatcher.

=== Dallas Stars ===
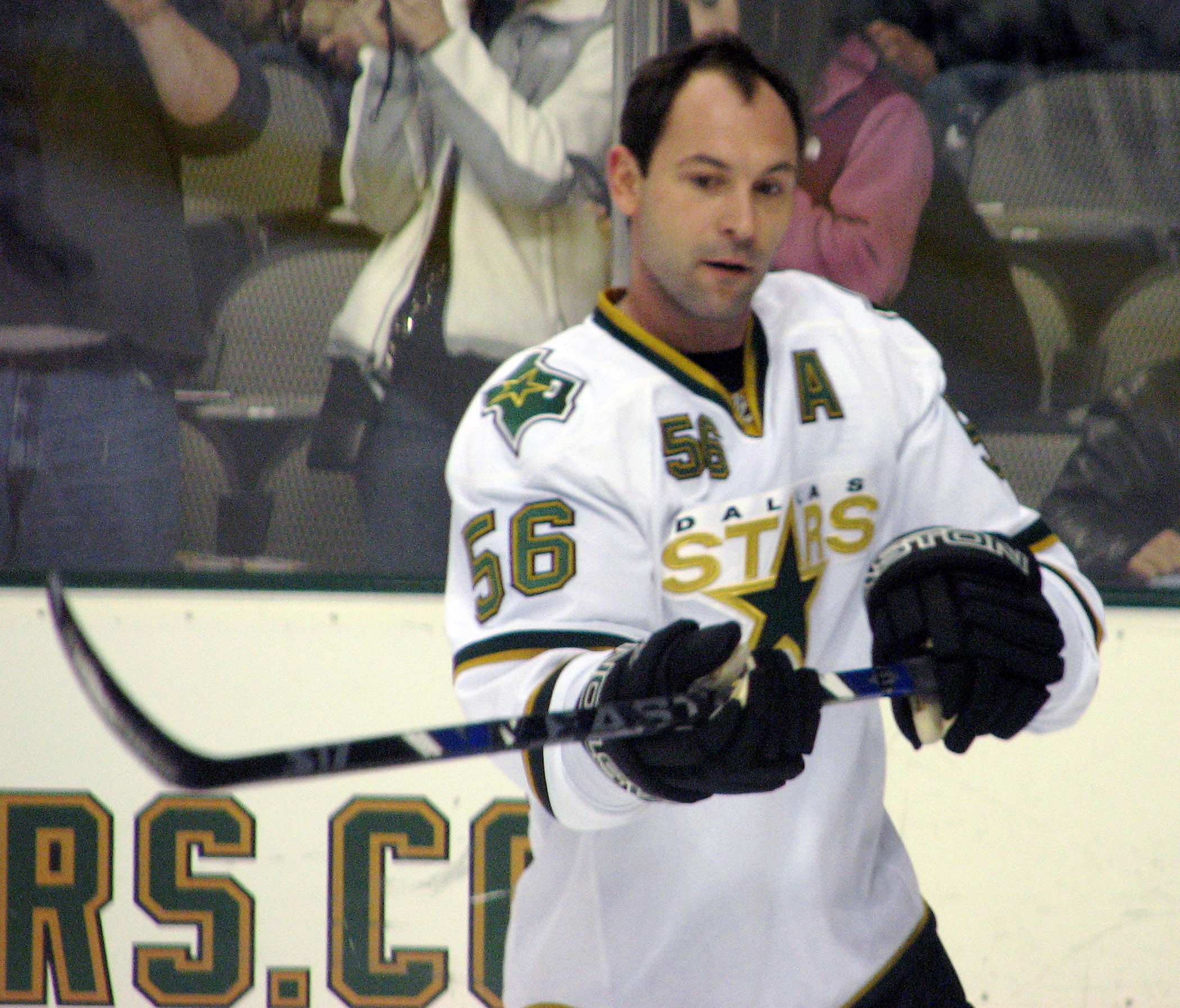
Zubov with the Dallas Stars in 2007

Although Zubov never again reached the scoring height of his 1993–94 season with the Rangers, he earned all three of his trips to the All-Star game with the Stars. He never again reached an 80+ point total, but had 11 consecutive years of 40+ point seasons and 30+ assists. He only recorded a negative plus/minus four times in his career, with two of them within his first three years in the league. In the 2005–06 season, Zubov posted 71 points for his highest outing in over a decade, and also received his first Norris Trophy nomination. Zubov missed nearly half of the 2007–08 NHL season with a sports hernia injury and most of the 2008–09 NHL season with a hip injury.

=== SKA Saint Petersburg ===
On 30 July 2009, he decided to leave the NHL as he signed a contract with SKA Saint Petersburg of the Kontinental Hockey League (KHL). He was also selected as a reserve by Team Russia for the 2010 Winter Olympics should an injury occur during the tournament. On 18 April 2011, it was reported that Zubov would officially retire due to hip-related injury problems.

== International play ==
Medal record

Representing Unified Team

Ice hockey

Olympic Games
Gold medal – first place	1992 Albertville	

Representing Soviet Union

World Junior Championship
Gold medal – first place	1989 United States	
Silver medal – second place	1990 Finland	

Zubov represented the Soviet Union where he won the gold and silver medals in 1989 and 1990 in the Junior Division. Zubov won a gold medal at the 1992 Winter Olympics, playing for the Unified Team.

== Coaching career ==
On 20 July 2015, Zubov was named to the coaching staff of the Russian national team as a defensive assistant. Zubov served as the head coach of HC Sochi starting from the 2017–18 season. He was dismissed as head coach 16 games into the 2019–20 season following a 5–11 start.

== Legacy ==
In the 2009 book 100 Ranger Greats, Zubov was ranked No. 72 all-time of the 901 New York Rangers who had played during the team's first 82 seasons Zubov left the NHL as the league's all-time scoring leader for Russian-born defensemen. He is now second behind Sergei Gonchar. On 28 January 2022, the Dallas Stars retired Zubov's number 56.

== Career statistics ==
=== Regular season and playoffs ===
			Regular season					Playoffs
Season	Team	League	GP	G	A	Pts	PIM	GP	G	A	Pts	PIM
1988–89	CSKA Moscow	USSR	29	1	4	5	10	—	—	—	—	—
1989–90	CSKA Moscow	USSR	48	6	2	8	16	—	—	—	—	—
1990–91	CSKA Moscow	USSR	41	6	5	11	8	—	—	—	—	—
1991–92	CSKA Moscow	CIS	36	4	7	11	8	8	0	0	0	0
1992–93	CSKA Moscow	IHL	1	0	1	1	0	—	—	—	—	—
1992–93	New York Rangers	NHL	49	8	23	31	4	—	—	—	—	—
1992–93	Binghamton Rangers	AHL	30	7	29	36	14	11	5	5	10	2
1993–94	New York Rangers	NHL	78	12	77	89	39	22	5	14	19	0
1993–94	Binghamton Rangers	AHL	2	1	2	3	0	—	—	—	—	—
1994–95	New York Rangers	NHL	38	10	26	36	18	10	3	8	11	2
1995–96	Pittsburgh Penguins	NHL	64	11	55	66	22	18	1	14	15	26
1996–97	Dallas Stars	NHL	78	13	30	43	24	7	0	3	3	2
1997–98	Dallas Stars	NHL	73	10	47	57	16	17	4	5	9	2
1998–99	Dallas Stars	NHL	81	10	41	51	20	23	1	12	13	4
1999–2000	Dallas Stars	NHL	77	9	33	42	18	18	2	7	9	6
2000–01	Dallas Stars	NHL	79	10	41	51	24	10	1	5	6	4
2001–02	Dallas Stars	NHL	80	12	32	44	22	—	—	—	—	—
2002–03	Dallas Stars	NHL	82	11	44	55	26	12	4	10	14	4
2003–04	Dallas Stars	NHL	77	7	35	42	20	5	1	1	2	0
2005–06	Dallas Stars	NHL	78	13	58	71	46	5	1	5	6	6
2006–07	Dallas Stars	NHL	78	12	42	54	26	6	0	4	4	2
2007–08	Dallas Stars	NHL	46	4	31	35	12	11	1	5	6	4
2008–09	Dallas Stars	NHL	10	0	4	4	0	—	—	—	—	—
2009–10	SKA Saint Petersburg	KHL	53	10	32	42	32	4	0	1	1	0
NHL totals			1,068	152	619	771	337	164	24	93	117	62

=== International ===
Year	Team	Event	GP	G	A	Pts	PIM
1988	Soviet Union	EJC	6	0	2	2	2
1989	Soviet Union	WJC	7	0	5	5	4
1990	Soviet Union	WJC	7	1	3	4	14
1992	Unified Team	OLY	8	0	1	1	0
1992	Russia	WC	6	2	2	4	10
1996	Russia	WCH	4	1	1	2	0
Junior totals			20	1	10	11	20
Senior totals			18	3	4	7	10

== Awards and honors ==
Award	Year
NHL
Hall of Fame	2019
Stanley Cup champion	1994, 1999
NHL All-Star Game	1998, 1999, 2000, 2008♱
NHL Second All-Star Team	2006
KHL
All-Star Game	2010

♱ did not play

=== Records ===
==== NHL ====
- Points by a Russian-born defenseman, single season, 89 (1993–94)

==== Dallas Stars ====
- Points by a defenseman, regular season (553)
- Points by a defenseman, playoff (72)

== See also ==
- List of NHL players with 1,000 games played
- List of NHL statistical leaders by country
