= Doug Armstrong =

Canadian ice hockey executive

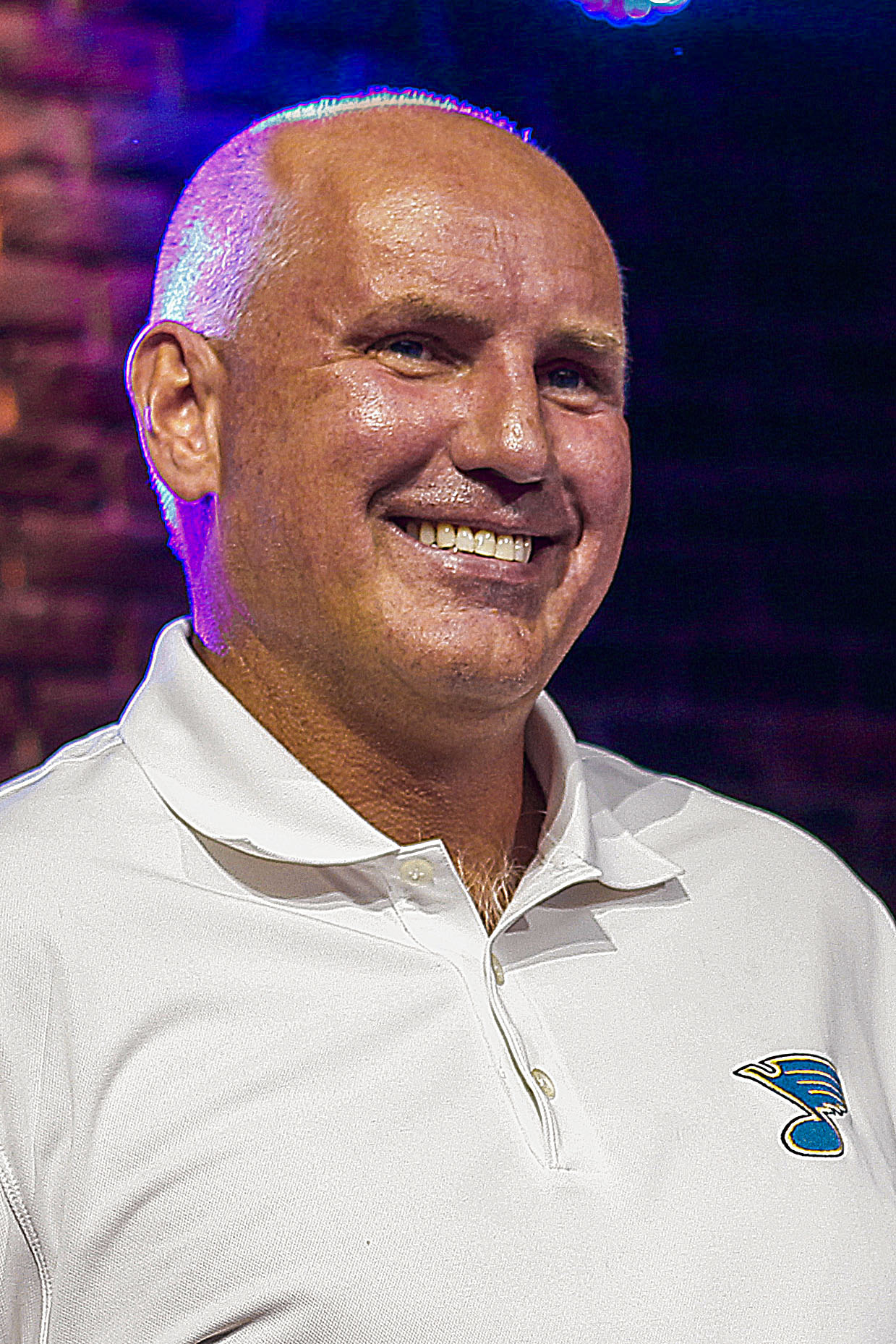
- Armstrong in 2014
- Born: September 24, 1964 (age 62); Sarnia, Ontario, Canada
- Occupations: NHL executive and president

Douglas Armstrong (born September 24, 1964) is a Canadian professional ice hockey executive who currently serves the president of hockey operations for the St. Louis Blues of the National Hockey League (NHL). He formerly served as general manager of the Blues, as well as the Dallas Stars.

== Front office career ==
=== Early life and Dallas Stars ===
Armstrong is the son of Hockey Hall of Fame linesman Neil Armstrong, inducted in 1991.

Armstrong joined the Minnesota North Stars organization for the 1990–91 season, and remained with the team when they relocated to Dallas to become the Dallas Stars in 1993, eventually being appointed general manager on January 25, 2002. He won the Stanley Cup as an assistant general manager with the Stars in 1999. Armstrong replaced Bob Gainey as GM of the Stars with 32 games to go in the 2001–02 NHL season, and one of his first moves was hiring Dave Tippett as head coach.

On November 13, 2007, in the wake of a 7–7–3 start and a colossal meltdown by the team away against the Los Angeles Kings (losing 6–5 in overtime after leading 4–0 with seven minutes remaining in the game), Armstrong was fired as GM and replaced by former Stars player Brett Hull and assistant GM Les Jackson as interim co-general managers. During Armstrong's tenure, the Stars went 210–109–35–23 in the regular season, representing a .634 winning percentage, which is best in Stars history for a General Manager. Some important moves Armstrong made during his time as GM included the drafting of players like Trevor Daley, James Neal, Loui Eriksson and Jamie Benn. He also made a trade for Mike Ribeiro in exchange for defenceman Janne Niinimaa, which turned out to be beneficial for Dallas' offence.

=== St. Louis Blues ===
On May 29, 2008, the St. Louis Blues announced they had named Armstrong as the club's director of player personnel after signing him to a two-year contract. When the two years were up, Armstrong became the club's general manager after Larry Pleau's retirement.

On June 17, 2010, the Blues acquired goaltender Jaroslav Halak from the Montreal Canadiens in exchange for prospects Lars Eller and Ian Schultz. Although he had yet to officially take over duties as GM, this was considered to be Armstrong's first big move as the GM of the Blues.

In 2013, Armstrong was named the NHL General Manager of the Year and runner up again in 2019.

In his tenure with the Blues, Armstrong has acquired many marquee players (whether by trade, free agency or the NHL Draft), including Martin Brodeur, Ryan O'Reilly, Vladimir Tarasenko, Jaden Schwartz, Alex Pietrangelo, Jay Bouwmeester, Paul Stastny, Ryan Miller, Jordan Binnington, Robert Thomas, Jordan Kyrou and Colton Parayko. Armstrong also succeeded in acquiring Philip Broberg and Dylan Holloway from the Edmonton Oilers via offer sheets.

In 2018–19, Armstrong's Blues would surge up the standings for a third-place finish in the Central Division before eventually defeating the Boston Bruins in seven games to win their first Stanley Cup championship in franchise history.

In Armstrong's 15 seasons as general manager with St. Louis, the Blues have made the Stanley Cup Playoffs 11 times, making five second-round appearances, two Western Conference Final appearances and earning one championship.

Armstrong claimed his 600th win as the Blues General Manager on April 10, 2024 vs. Chicago, becoming the 19th general manager in NHL history to achieve that mark with a single franchise. One month earlier, he became the 11th general manager in NHL history to reach 800 wins overall and the second quickest to do so.

At the completion of the 2024-25 season, Armstrong ranked ninth all-time amongst GMs with 855 wins.

Following the 2025–26 season, Armstrong was succeeded as general manager by Alexander Steen, remaining with the club as its president of hockey operations.

=== International ===
Armstrong has been part of Hockey Canada's management group for seven Gold Medal winning teams, the 2010 and 2014 Winter Olympics; 2007, 2016 and 2023 World Championship Teams, 2016 World Cup Team, and the 2025 NHL Four Nations Cup. Plus three Silver Medal Winning Teams in the 2026 Winter Olympics and 2008 and 2009 World Championship Teams. After winning the Stanley Cup in 2019 with the St. Louis Blues Armstrong became the 1st person in management to become part of the Double Triple Gold Club ( Winning Stanley Cup in 1999 and 2019, Olympics in 2010 and 2014 plus World Championship in 2007 and 2016). He also served on Canada's 2002 World Championship Team (did not medal). On February 3, 2021, it was announced that Armstrong would be the General Manager for Team Canada's 2022 Olympic team but NHL participation was canceled due to the Covid Pandemic. Armstrong served as Executive Director for Team Canada at the 2024 and 2025 World Championships, 2025 NHL Four Nations Cup, and served as General Manager for Team Canada at the 2026 Winter Olympics.

Sporting positions
| Preceded by Bob Gainey | General manager of the Dallas Stars; 2002–07 | Succeeded by Brett Hull; Les Jackson |
| Preceded by Larry Pleau | General manager of the St. Louis Blues; 2010–2026 | Succeeded by Alexander Steen |
