= Dallas Stars =

National Hockey League team in Dallas, Texas

- 2026–27 Dallas Stars season
- Conference: Western
- Division: Central
- Founded: 1967
- History: Minnesota North Stars; 1967–1993; Dallas Stars; 1993–present
- Home arena: American Airlines Center
- City: Dallas, Texas
- Team colors: Victory green, black, silver, skyline green, white
- Media: Amazon Prime Video; KTCK-FM/AM
- Owner: Tom Gaglardi
- General manager: Jim Nill
- Head coach: Glen Gulutzan
- Captain: Jamie Benn
- Minor league affiliates: Texas Stars (AHL); Idaho Steelheads (ECHL)
- Stanley Cups: 1 (1998–99)
- Conference championships: 3 (1998–99, 1999–00, 2019–20)
- Presidents' Trophies: 2 (1997–98, 1998–99)
- Division championships: 9 (1996–97, 1997–98, 1998–99, 1999–00, 2000–01, 2002–03, 2005–06, 2015–16, 2023–24)
- Official website: nhl.com/stars

The Dallas Stars are a professional ice hockey team based in Dallas. The Stars compete in the National Hockey League (NHL) as a member of the Central Division in the Western Conference. The Stars played in Reunion Arena in downtown Dallas from 1993 to 2001, when they moved into the American Airlines Center in Dallas's nearby Victory Park neighborhood, an arena they share with the Dallas Mavericks of the National Basketball Association (NBA).

The Stars were founded during the 1967 NHL expansion as the Minnesota North Stars, based in Bloomington, Minnesota. Before the 1978–79 NHL season, the team merged with the Cleveland Barons after the league granted them permission due to each team's respective financial struggles. The franchise moved to Dallas for the 1993–94 NHL season and was renamed the Dallas Stars.

The Stars have won nine division titles in Dallas, two Presidents' Trophies as the top regular season team in the league, the Western Conference championship three times, and the Stanley Cup in 1999, when center Joe Nieuwendyk won the Conn Smythe Trophy as the most valuable player of the playoffs. Over the course of the franchise's history in both Minnesota and Dallas, the team has appeared in the Stanley Cup Final five times (1981, 1991, 1999, 2000, and 2020).

In 2000, Neal Broten was inducted into the United States Hockey Hall of Fame. In 2009, Brett Hull became the first Dallas Stars player inducted into the Hockey Hall of Fame, followed by Ed Belfour and Joe Nieuwendyk in 2011 and Mike Modano in 2014; Modano is the highest-scoring player in franchise history. Five further players and one coach have since been inducted into the Hall of Fame.

== History ==
=== 1967–1993: Minnesota North Stars ===
The Minnesota North Stars began play in 1967 as part of the league's six-team expansion. Home games were played at the newly constructed Metropolitan Sports Center ("Met Center") in Bloomington, Minnesota. Initially successful both on the ice and at the gate, the North Stars fell victim to financial problems after several poor seasons in the mid-1970s.

The logo of the Minnesota North Stars from 1991 to 1993. When the team moved to Dallas in 1993, it used a similar logo, usually with the word "DALLAS" above "STARS," until 2013.

In 1978, the North Stars merged with the Cleveland Barons (formerly the California Golden Seals), owned by George III and Gordon Gund. With both teams on the verge of folding, the league permitted the two failing franchises to merge. The merged team continued as the Minnesota North Stars, while the Seals/Barons franchise records were retired. However, the Gunds were the merged team's principal owners, and the North Stars assumed the Barons' place in the Adams Division in order to balance out the divisions. The merger brought with it a number of talented players, and the North Stars were revived – they reached the 1981 Stanley Cup Final, where they lost in five games to the New York Islanders. However, by the early 1990s, declining attendance and the inability to secure a new downtown revenue-generating arena led ownership to request permission to move the team to the San Francisco Bay Area in 1990. The league rejected the request and instead agreed to award an expansion franchise, the San Jose Sharks, to the Gund brothers. The North Stars were sold to a group of investors that were originally looking to place a team in San Jose, although one of the group's members, former Calgary Flames part-owner Norman Green, would eventually gain control of the team. In the 1990–91 season, the North Stars made it to the Stanley Cup Final, only to lose to the Pittsburgh Penguins.

After the 1990–91 season, the North Stars suffered through declining profits coupled with distraction and uncertainty caused by attempts to move the team. The team's fortunes were further impeded by the terms of the settlement with the Gund brothers, in which they were permitted to take a number of North Stars players to San Jose. In their final two seasons in Minnesota, the team adopted a new logo which omitted any reference to the word "North" from "North Stars", leading many fans to anticipate the team heading south. Green explored the possibility of moving the team to Anaheim, California to play at a new arena (which is now the Honda Center) under construction, and intended to call the team the Los Angeles Stars. However, the NHL had been courted by The Walt Disney Company to grant it an expansion franchise for Anaheim's new arena. The league asked Green to cede Anaheim to a Disney-owned expansion franchise eventually known as the Mighty Ducks of Anaheim. In return, Green could move the North Stars to any other market.

=== 1993–1998: Move and early years in Dallas ===
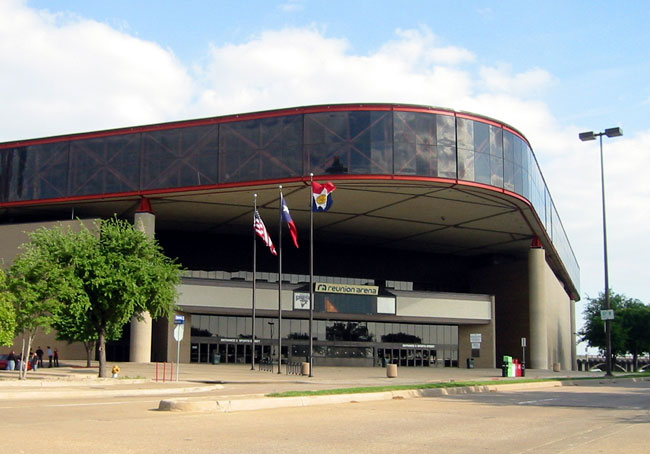
Reunion Arena was the first home for the Stars in Dallas. The arena was the Stars' home from 1993 to 2001.

In 1993, amid further attendance woes and bitter personal controversy, Green obtained permission from the league to move the team to Dallas, for the 1993–94 season, with the decision announced on March 10, 1993. Green was convinced by former Dallas Cowboys quarterback Roger Staubach that Dallas would be a suitable market for an NHL team. With the team's move to the Southern United States, Green decided to drop the "North" adjective but otherwise retained the "Stars" nickname, which in its shortened form quickly proved popular as it matched the state of Texas' official nickname as "The Lone Star State." An NHL franchise in Dallas was an experiment for the league, as at that time the Stars would be one of the three southernmost teams in the league along with two recently created expansion teams in the Tampa Bay Lightning and Florida Panthers as the league's first real ventures into southern non-traditional hockey markets. The Stars would move into Reunion Arena, built in 1980, the downtown arena already occupied by the National Basketball Association's Dallas Mavericks.

To quell the ensuing controversy surrounding the North Stars move to Dallas, the NHL promised that the Twin Cities would receive an expansion franchise in the near future; that promise was fulfilled in 2000 in the form of the Minnesota Wild.

The league changed the names of the conferences and divisions that season. The newly moved Stars were placed in the Central Division of the Western Conference, although these were essentially continuations of the Norris Division and Campbell Conference respectively, both of which the North Stars had been part of. The first NHL game in Dallas was played on October 5, 1993, and was a 6–4 win against the Detroit Red Wings. Somewhat ironically, Minnesota native Neal Broten scored the first Stars goal in Dallas. Though the Stars were relatively still low on the Dallas-Fort Worth sports pecking order upon their arrival, popularity of the team grew rapidly and the immediate success of the team on the ice, as well as Mike Modano's career-best season (50 goals, 93 points) helped spur the team's popularity in North Texas. The Stars set franchise bests in wins (42) and points (97) in their first season in Dallas, qualifying for the 1994 playoffs. The Stars further shocked the hockey world by sweeping the St. Louis Blues in the first round, but lost to the eventual Western Conference Champion Vancouver Canucks in the second round. The Stars' success in their first season along with Modano's spectacular on-ice performances, would be an integral part of the Stars' eventual franchise success in the immediate years to come.

The almost immediate success of the Stars was also helped by the long legacy of minor-league hockey in the area. Both incarnations of the Central Hockey League had two teams in the area, the Dallas Black Hawks and the Fort Worth Texans for years before the Stars' arrival. Amateur and youth hockey in North Texas were also extremely popular because of the long presence of the minor league teams.

==== 1994–1998: Arrival of Tom Hicks and building for a championship ====
The 1994–95 season was shortened by an owners' lockout. The Stars traded captain Mark Tinordi along with Rick Mrozik to the Washington Capitals before the season began for Kevin Hatcher. Longtime North Stars hold-over Neal Broten was named his replacement, although he was traded too after only 17 games to the New Jersey Devils. Broten was replaced by Kevin's younger brother Derian Hatcher as team captain, a role he would serve in for the next decade. The Stars played only 48 games that season posting a record of 17–23–8. Despite the shortened season and the losing record, the Stars again made the playoffs, losing in five games to the Red Wings in the first round. Green, who had run into financial problems stemming from his business ventures outside of ice hockey, was forced to sell the team to businessman Tom Hicks in December 1995.

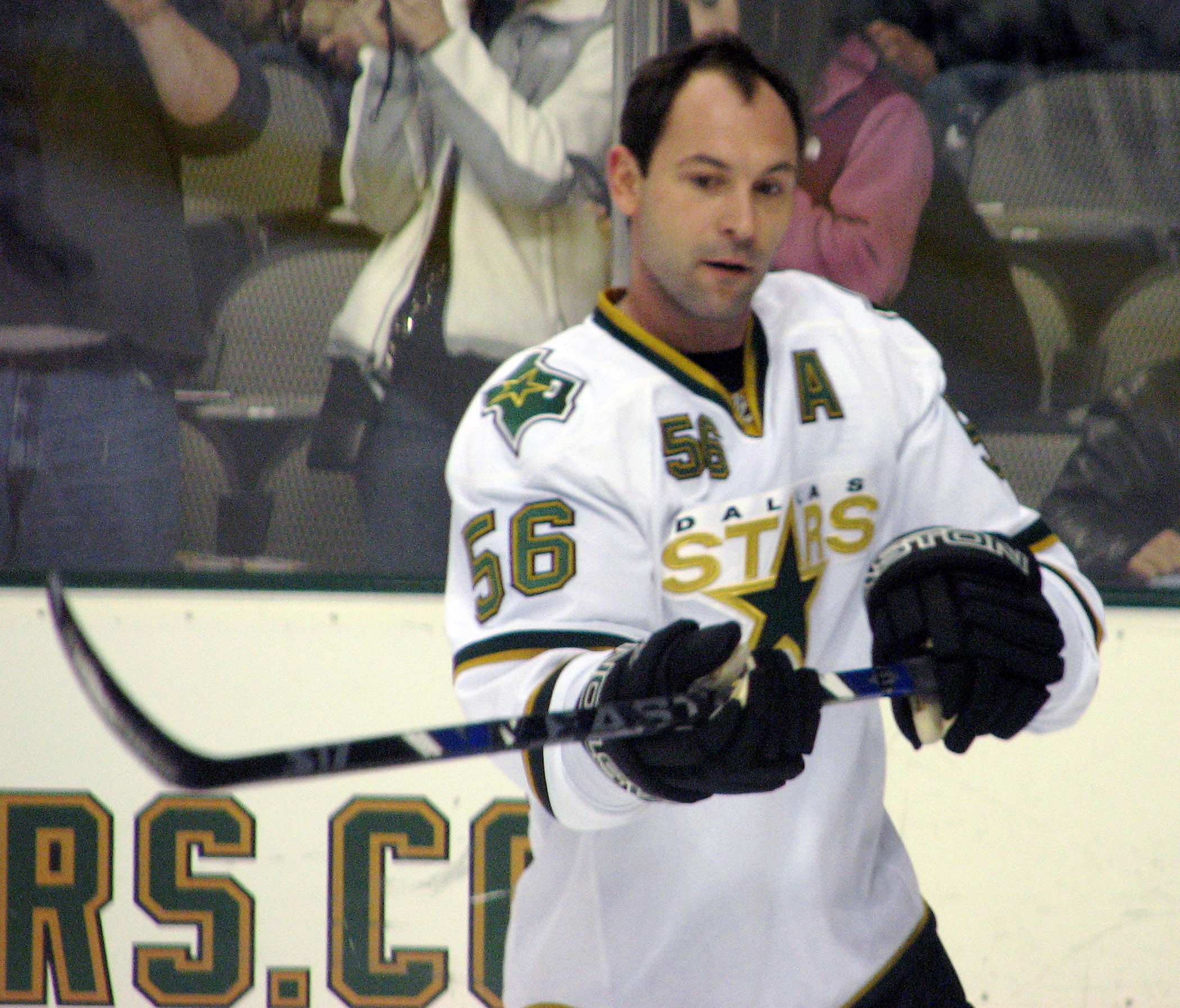
The Stars made several moves to revamp the roster in the 1996 off-season, notably making a trade to acquire Sergei Zubov. He remained on the team until he left the league in 2009.

The 1995–96 season would be the first season under new owner Tom Hicks. In the off-season, the Stars traded for former Montreal Canadiens' captain and three-time Frank J. Selke Trophy winner Guy Carbonneau, who was then with the St. Louis Blues. With the Stars struggling to begin the season, general manager and head coach Bob Gainey traded for center Joe Nieuwendyk from the Calgary Flames in exchange for Corey Millen and Jarome Iginla, then a Stars prospect. The Stars recorded only 11 wins in the first half of the season, and Bob Gainey relinquished his coaching duties in January to be the full-time general manager of the team. The Stars soon hired Michigan K-Wings head coach Ken Hitchcock to replace him; it would be his first NHL head coaching position. The Stars then traded for Benoît Hogue from the Toronto Maple Leafs late in the season, but ultimately finished in sixth place in the Central Division, missing the playoffs for the first time since moving to Texas.

In the 1996 off-season, the Stars continued to revamp their roster, adding defensemen Darryl Sydor from the Los Angeles Kings followed by Sergei Zubov from the Pittsburgh Penguins for Kevin Hatcher. Zubov would serve as the Stars' top defenseman and powerplay quarterback until leaving the league in 2009. On the ice, Ken Hitchcock's first season proved to be a good one. The Stars bested their 1994 totals, posting 48 wins and reaching the 100-point mark for the first time in franchise history. The Stars won the Central Division, their first division title since 1983–84 (when they were still the Minnesota North Stars) and were seeded second in the playoffs. Despite the regular season success, the youthful Stars were upset in the first round by the Edmonton Oilers in seven games. Defenseman Grant Ledyard tripped in overtime of game 7, allowing Todd Marchant to score the game- and series-winning goal on a breakaway against goaltender Andy Moog.

During the 1997 off-season, the Stars signed star goaltender Ed Belfour as a free agent after a well-publicized falling-out with the San Jose Sharks, which had traded a number of players to the Chicago Blackhawks to obtain him in January in the previous season. Andy Moog was allowed to leave via free agency, but later returned to the Stars as an assistant coach. The 1997–98 season was another banner year for the Stars. The Stars again set franchise records in wins (49) and points (109). Dallas acquired Mike Keane at the deadline from the New York Rangers. The Stars won the franchise's first Presidents' Trophy as the league's best regular season team, as well as the Central Division title for the second season in a row. Belfour set franchise season records for goals against average (1.88), wins (37) and just missed out on the Jennings Trophy by one goal to Martin Brodeur of the New Jersey Devils. The Stars were the first overall seed for the 1998 Stanley Cup playoffs and defeated the eighth-seeded San Jose Sharks in six games in the first round. Notorious enforcer Bryan Marchment injured Joe Nieuwendyk's right knee, forcing him to miss the rest of the playoffs with torn ligaments. In the second round, they again met the Edmonton Oilers, this time defeating them in five games. However, without Nieuwendyk, the Stars lacked the firepower to overcome the defending Stanley Cup champion Detroit Red Wings in the conference finals and lost in six games. The Red Wings went on to win their second consecutive Stanley Cup.

=== 1998–2004: Stanley Cup contention and 1999 Stanley Cup championship ===
==== 1999 Stanley Cup title and 2000 Stanley Cup Final run ====
In the 1998 off-season, after falling just short in the conference finals, the Stars added what they believed was the final piece toward winning a championship: star goalscoring winger Brett Hull. Hull had already had a successful career with the St. Louis Blues, with three consecutive 70-goal seasons and a Hart Memorial Trophy, but a fallout with Blues management led Hull to leave St. Louis via free agency. Additionally, this was the first season for the Stars in the Pacific Division after the 1998 NHL division re-alignment.

In the 1998–99 season, the Stars won 51 games, surpassing the 50-win mark for the first time in franchise history. They also recorded 114 points, which still stands today as a franchise record. They won their first Pacific Division by 24 points (their third consecutive division title), a second consecutive Presidents' Trophy, the Jennings Trophy as the league's top defensive team, and were awarded home-ice advantage throughout the 1999 playoffs. Winger Jere Lehtinen was also awarded the Frank J. Selke Trophy.

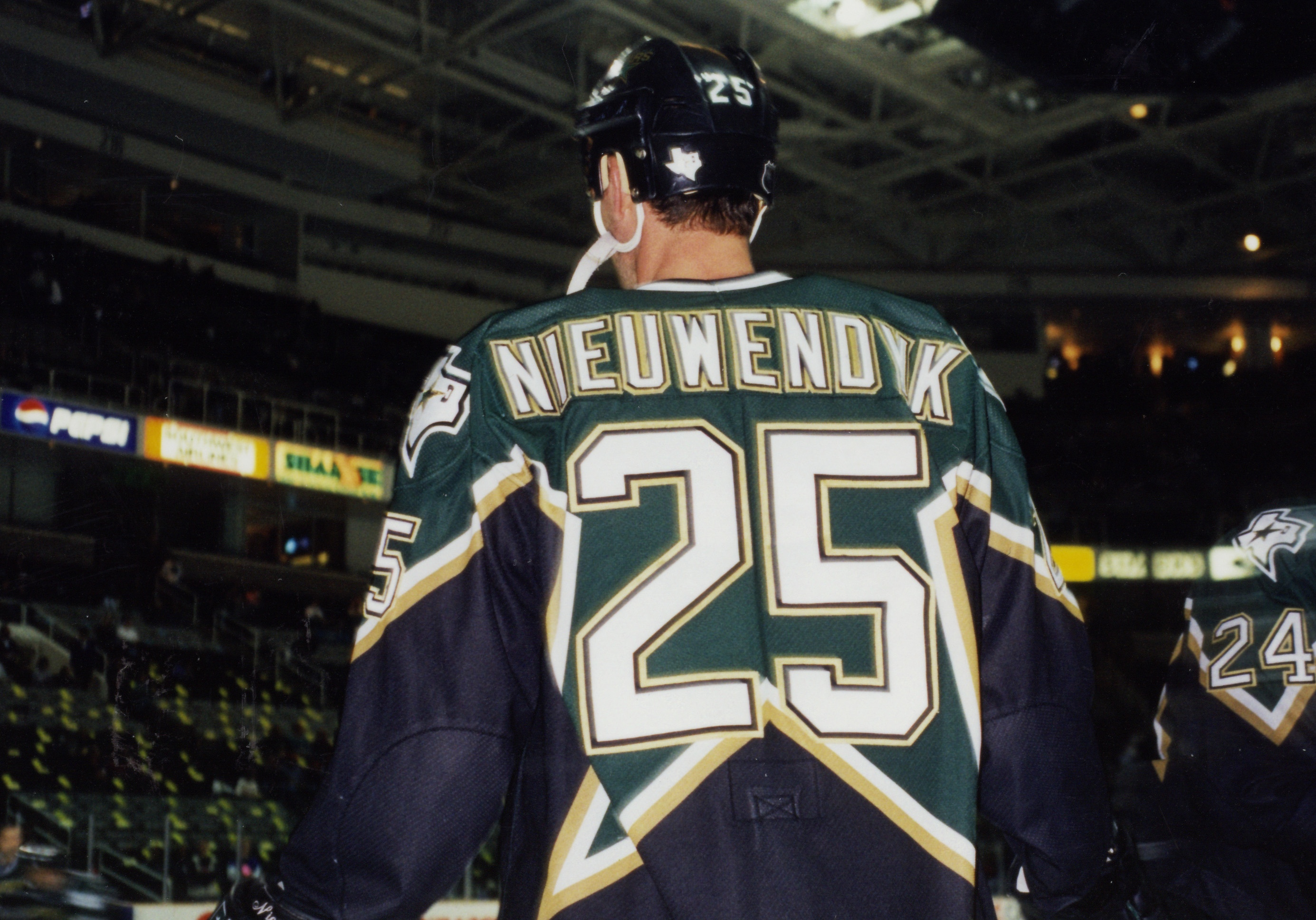
Joe Nieuwendyk helped the Stars win their first Stanley Cup in 1999. Nieuwendyk was awarded the Conn Smythe Trophy for that year's playoffs.

In the first round of the playoffs, Dallas faced the Edmonton Oilers. The Stars swept the Oilers in four close games, winning game 4 in the third overtime on a goal by Joe Nieuwendyk. They then faced the St. Louis Blues in the second round. After taking a 2–0 series lead, the Blues came back to tie the series. The Stars then won the next two games to beat the Blues in six games. The series again ended on an overtime goal, this time in game 6 from Mike Modano. In the conference finals, they faced the Colorado Avalanche for the first time in Stars playoff history. This would be the first of four playoff meetings between the Stars and Avalanche in the next seven years. After both the Stars and the Avalanche split the first four games at a 2–2 series tie, the Avalanche won game 5 by a score of 7–5, taking a 3–2 series lead, The Stars rallied winning game six on the road, and game 7 at home, both by 4–1 scorelines.

This was the Stars' first Stanley Cup Final appearance as the Dallas Stars, although they made the final series twice as the Minnesota North Stars. They faced the Eastern Conference champion Buffalo Sabres, who had defeated the Toronto Maple Leafs 4–1 in the conference finals. After splitting the first four games, the Stars vaunted defense would hold the Sabres to only one goal in the next two, winning game 5 2–0 and game 6 2–1 on a triple-overtime goal by Brett Hull. Hull's goal at 14:51 of the third overtime was allowed to stand only after a lengthy official review. That season, the league still had the "crease rule" in effect, which provided that if any player of the attacking team who did not have possession of the puck entered the crease before the puck, then any resulting goal was disallowed. Hull had initially gained possession of the puck outside the crease and had made a shot that was blocked by Buffalo goaltender Dominik Hašek. One of Hull's skates entered the crease as he corralled the rebound, and Hull's second shot scored the Cup-winning goal. The goal was eventually allowed, as having simply blocked Hull's shot rather than catching it, Hašek never took possession of the puck away from Hull. Officials therefore determined that rather than calling it a loose puck, Hull would be considered to have had continuous possession of the puck from before his first shot outside the crease. The resulting controversy underscored the complexity of the crease rule and fans' and players' difficulties in understanding its application, and the rule was repealed the following season. Hull's goal marked the 13th time a Stanley Cup-winning goal was scored in overtime, and only the fourth to be scored in multiple overtimes. This was the only time between 1995 and 2003 that the Cup was won by a team other than the New Jersey Devils, Colorado Avalanche, or Detroit Red Wings.

The team added veterans Kirk Muller, Dave Manson and Sylvain Côté to defend their Stanley Cup championship in the 1999–2000 season. On December 31, 1999, Brett Hull scored his 600 and 601st career goals in a 5–4 win over the Mighty Ducks of Anaheim. The Stars ultimately won the Pacific Division for the second year in a row, and were seeded second in the Western Conference. Dallas then defeated the Edmonton Oilers and San Jose Sharks in the first and second rounds, both 4–1 series victories. The Stars, for the second season in a row, defeated the Colorado Avalanche in the conference finals in seven games to reach their second consecutive Stanley Cup Final, where they met the New Jersey Devils. Because the Devils finished the regular season with one more point than Dallas, the Stars had to play their first playoff series without home-ice advantage since 1995. The Stars lost all three games at the Reunion Arena, and lost the series in game 6 on a double-overtime goal by New Jersey forward Jason Arnott.

==== 2001–2004: Continued playoff contention ====
Hoping to win back the Stanley Cup, the Stars again captured the Pacific Division, posting a solid 48–24–8–2 record in the 2000–01 season. In the playoffs, the Stars and the Edmonton Oilers met in the first round, battling back-and-forth through the first four games, with each game decided by one goal, including three going into overtime. Game 5 would also go to overtime, as the Stars took a 3–2 series lead on a goal by Kirk Muller. However, in game 6 in Edmonton, the Stars did not need overtime, advancing to the second round with a 3–1 win. Facing the St. Louis Blues, the Stars would run out of gas, being swept in four straight games. Game 2 loss would be the last NHL game played in Reunion Arena.

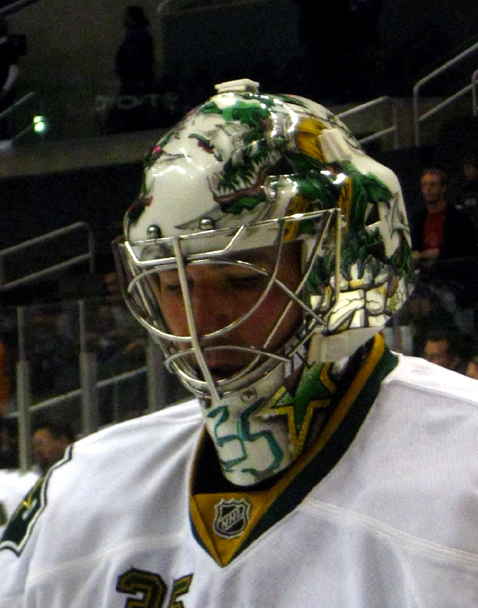
Marty Turco was awarded the starting goaltender position in the 2002–03 season, with the departure of Ed Belfour to free agency.

Moving into the brand new American Airlines Center for the 2001–02 season, the Stars had a slow start to the season, as goaltender Ed Belfour struggled through one of his worst seasons. Head coach Ken Hitchcock was eventually fired, being replaced by Rick Wilson. Despite the coaching change, the Stars continued to play poor hockey. With the prospect of missing the playoffs, the Stars traded 1999 Conn Smythe winner Joe Nieuwendyk and Jamie Langenbrunner to the New Jersey Devils in exchange for Randy McKay and Jason Arnott, who scored the game-winning goal in the 2000 Cup Final against Dallas. The Stars would eventually go on to post a respectable record of 35–28–13–5. However, it would not be enough for the playoffs, as they fell four points short of the final eighth spot in the Western Conference. After the season, coach Rick Wilson returned to assistant coaching duties, and the Stars brought in Dave Tippett as his replacement.

As in the 2002 off-season, Ed Belfour left via free agency to the Toronto Maple Leafs. To begin the 2002–03 season, the Stars awarded the starting goaltending position to Marty Turco, who went on to have one of the best seasons in NHL history, posting the lowest goals-against average (GAA) since 1940, at 1.76. However, missing 18 games late in the season likely cost him a shot at the Vezina Trophy, awarded to the league's top regular season goaltender. Regardless, the Stars posted the best record in the Western Conference at 46–17–15–4, and along the way, two-way star Jere Lehtinen won his third Frank J. Selke Trophy. In the playoffs, the Stars once again met the Edmonton Oilers, and once again the Oilers would prove a contentious opponent, winning two of the first three games. However, the Stars would prove the better team again by winning the next three games to take the series in six games. The Stars' second-round series against the Mighty Ducks of Anaheim got off to an unbelievable start, as the game went deep into overtime tied 3–3. However, Mighty Ducks goaltender Jean-Sébastien Giguère stopped 60 shots as the Ducks scored early in the fifth overtime. Game 2 would be more of the same, as the Ducks stunned the Stars in overtime. Desperately needing a win, the Stars bounced back to take game 3 in Anaheim. However, the Ducks would take a 3–1 series lead by breaking a scoreless tie late in the third period of game 4. In game 5, the Stars finally solved Giguère by scoring four goals to keep their playoff hopes alive. However, the Stars' dreams of a return trip to the Stanley Cup Final ended in heartbreaking fashion as the Ducks broke a 3–3 tie with 1:06 left in game 6 on a goal by defenseman Sandis Ozoliņš.

Coming off their disappointing playoff loss, the Stars would get off to a shaky start to the 2003–04 season, as they played mediocre hockey through the first three months of the season, posting a sub-.500 record. However, as the calendar turned to 2004, the Stars began to find their game, as they posted a 9–4–3 record in January. As the season wore on, the Stars would get stronger, climbing up the playoff ladder and eventually reaching second place in the Pacific Division, where they finished with a solid 41–26–13–2 record; Marty Turco had another outstanding season, recording a 1.98 GAA. However, the Stars could not carry their momentum into the playoffs, as they were beaten by the Colorado Avalanche in five games in the first round.

=== 2005–2011: Early years of the post-lockout era ===
==== 2005–2008: Return from lockout, 2008 Western Conference finals run ====
Coming out of the owners' lockout that cancelled the entire 2004–05 season, the Stars remained one of the strongest teams in the Western Conference for the start of 2005–06, as they won four of their first five games on the way to a solid October. November would be even better for Dallas, as they won 10 of 13 games and took over first place in the Pacific Division, a position they would hold most of the season, as they went on to finish with a terrific record of 53–23–6. One reason for the Stars' success was their strong play in shootouts, as forward Jussi Jokinen was nearly automatic, making 10-of-13 shot attempts. Also performing strongly in shootouts was Sergei Zubov, who used a slow-but-steady backhand to go 7-for-12, as the Stars ultimately won 12 of 13 games that were settled by a shootout. As the number two seed in the Western Conference, the Stars faced the seventh-seeded Colorado Avalanche. The Stars were favorited to win the Western Conference, and some even predicted them to win the Stanley Cup. However, the Stars would stumble right from the start, losing game 1 by a score of 5–2 as the Avalanche scored five unanswered goals after the Stars jumped out to a promising 2–0 lead. Game 2 would see the Stars suffer another setback at home, as the Stars lost in overtime 5–4 on a goal by Joe Sakic. On the road in game 3, the Stars led 3–2 in the final minute before the Avalanche forced overtime on a goal by Andrew Brunette, while Alex Tanguay won the game just 69 seconds into overtime to put the Stars in a 3–0 hole. The Stars would avoid the sweep with a 4–1 win in game 4, but overtime would doom them again in game 5, as Andrew Brunette scored the series winner at 6:05, ending the Stars' playoffs hopes after just five games.

The Stars made a number of changes during the 2006 off-season. Former Stars goalkeeper Andy Moog was promoted to assistant general manager for player development (he kept his job as goaltending coach) and former player Ulf Dahlén was hired as an assistant coach. The Stars allowed center Jason Arnott, defenseman Willie Mitchell and goaltender Johan Hedberg to leave as free agents. Forward Niko Kapanen was traded to the Atlanta Thrashers and the remaining two years on fan-favorite right winger Bill Guerin's contract were bought out. The Stars also received Patrik Štefan and Jaroslav Modrý in the Atlanta trade, and signed Eric Lindros, Jeff Halpern, Matthew Barnaby and Darryl Sydor as free agents. Young goaltender Mike Smith was promoted to the NHL to serve as Marty Turco's backup. During the season, key future pieces – center Mike Ribeiro and defenseman Mattias Norström – were added through separate trades. Young players Joel Lundqvist, Krys Barch, Nicklas Grossmann and Chris Conner all saw significant ice time while other players were out of the lineup with injuries.

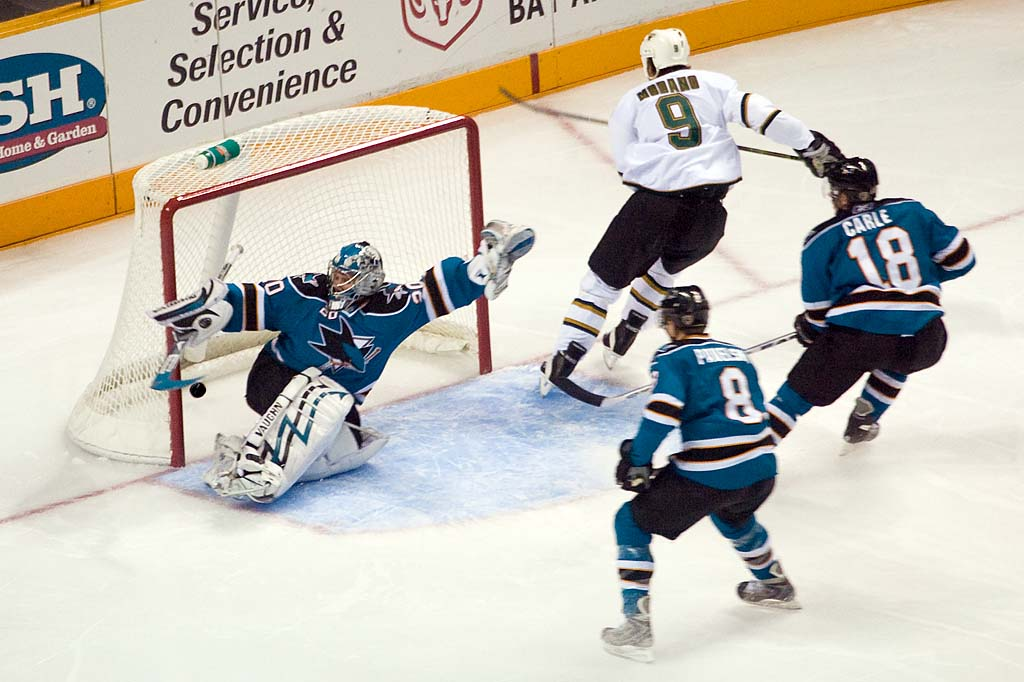
Mike Modano scoring his 500th goal on November 7, 2007, against the San Jose Sharks. He was the second American-born player to reach the milestone.

On September 29, 2006, Brenden Morrow was announced as new team captain, taking the role over from Mike Modano, who had served as the incumbent since 2003. On March 13, 2007, Modano scored his 500th career NHL goal, making him only the 39th player and second American to ever reach the milestone. On March 17, Modano scored his 502nd and 503rd NHL goals, breaking the record for an American-born player, previously held by Joe Mullen.

On January 24, 2007, the NHL All-Star Game was held at American Airlines Center. Defenseman Philippe Boucher and goaltender Marty Turco would represent the Stars as part of the Western Conference All-Star roster. The Stars qualified for the playoffs as the sixth seed in the Western Conference and squared off against the Vancouver Canucks in the first round. Marty Turco delivered three shutout wins in games 2, 5 and 6, but the Stars' offense failed to capitalize and they lost the series in seven games, the third season in a row that they lost in the first round.

In the 2007 NHL entry draft, the Stars drafted the relatively unknown Jamie Benn 129th overall. After starting a lackluster 7–7–3 in the 2007–08 season, general manager Doug Armstrong was fired by the team. He was replaced by an unusual "co-general manager" arrangement of former assistant GM Les Jackson and former Stars player Brett Hull. On November 8, 2007, Mike Modano became the top American born point scorer of all time, finishing off a shorthanded breakaway opportunity on San Jose Sharks goaltender Evgeni Nabokov.

On February 26, 2008, just hours before the trade deadline, the Stars traded for All-Star center Brad Richards from the Tampa Bay Lightning in exchange for backup goaltender Mike Smith and forwards Jussi Jokinen and Jeff Halpern. The Stars rallied to a final record of 45–30–7 and qualified for the playoffs as the fifth seed, matching up with the defending Stanley Cup champion, the Anaheim Ducks, in the first round. After a rough end to the season, only winning two games in March of that year, the Stars shocked everyone by winning the first two games of the series in Anaheim, and then would go on to finish off the Ducks in six games, their first playoff series win since 2003. In the second round, the Stars matched up with the Pacific Division champion San Jose Sharks. Once again, the Stars surprised everyone by winning the first two games of the series on the road. In game 2, Brad Richards tied an NHL record by recording four points in the third period. The Stars would then take a 3–0 series lead after a Mattias Norstrom overtime goal in game 3. After the Sharks staved off elimination with back to back wins in games 4 and 5, captain Brenden Morrow finished the Sharks off in game 6 with a powerplay goal nearly halfway into the fourth overtime, a moment nicknamed "Cinco De Morrow" by Stars fans as game 6 ended in the early morning hours of the Cinco De Mayo holiday on May 5. The win sent the Stars to their first conference finals since 2000, where they met the powerhouse Detroit Red Wings. After falling behind in the series 3–0, the Stars made a series of it winning games 4 and 5 before ultimately being ousted by the Red Wings in six games.

==== 2008–2011: Team difficulties and transition seasons ====
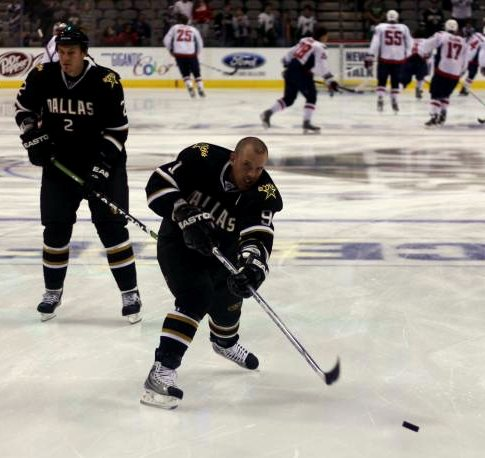
Brad Richards shoots the puck in pregame warm-up during the 2008–09 season. Injuries to Richards and other teammates during the course of the 2008–09 season led the Stars to miss their first playoffs since 2002.

The 2008–09 season saw the early loss for the season of captain Brenden Morrow to an ACL tear. Off-season free agent acquisition Sean Avery caused a media uproar over comments he made to a Canadian reporter about ex-girlfriend Elisha Cuthbert and her relationship with Calgary Flames' defenseman Dion Phaneuf before a game in Calgary. The incident forced the team to suspend Avery for the season; he was later waived by the Stars. That incident, plus injuries to key players Brad Richards and Sergei Zubov, caused the Stars to tailspin to a 12th-place finish and the first missed playoffs for Dallas since 2002.

In the wake of the season, the Stars hired a new general manager, former player and alternate captain Joe Nieuwendyk. Hull and Jackson remained with the Stars, but were reassigned to new roles within the organization. Less than a week after he was hired, Nieuwendyk fired six-season head coach Dave Tippett on June 10, 2009, and hired Marc Crawford the next day as his replacement. Other off-season moves included the addition of Charlie Huddy as assistant coach in charge of defense and the promotions of Stu Barnes and Andy Moog to assistant coaches. The Stars' 2009–10 season was similar to the previous one. Inconsistent play and defensive struggles plagued the team throughout the season, as they failed to adjust to Marc Crawford's new offensively-minded system, and owner Tom Hicks' financial troubles prevented the team from spending more than $45 million on payroll, over $11 million beneath the league salary cap. The Stars failed to win more than three games in a row all season, finished in last in the Pacific Division and repeated their 12th place conference finish from the year before with a record of 37–31–14 for 88 points, seven points back from the last playoff spot. This was the first time that they would miss the playoffs two seasons in a row since the Stars moved to Texas.

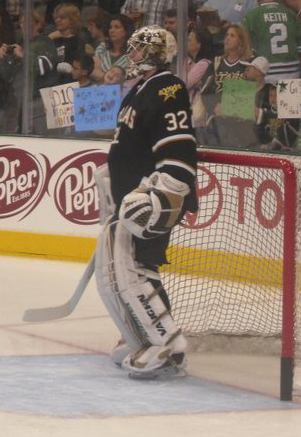
Kari Lehtonen in March 2011, towards the 2010–11 season. He was named the team's number one goaltender in the 2010 off-season after longtime goaltender Marty Turco left the club in free agency.

In the 2010 off-season, long-time goaltender Marty Turco was let go in favor of Kari Lehtonen to become the team's number one goaltender for the future. In the Star's last game of the season, away against the Minnesota Wild, Mike Modano was named the game's first star and skated around the rink after the game wearing his North Stars uniform, receiving a rousing ovation. The Stars also let Mike Modano walk in free agency, the face of the franchise for the past two decades. Modano subsequently signed with his hometown team, the Detroit Red Wings while Turco joined the newly defending Stanley Cup champion Chicago Blackhawks. Winger Jere Lehtinen, who played his entire career with the Stars, announced his retirement. The team also made key acquisitions both in trades or in free agency, such as winger Adam Burish (who was on the 2010 Stanley Cup champion Chicago Blackhawks) and goaltender Andrew Raycroft. They also gave Jonathan Cheechoo a try-out, but he was cut and later signed with division rivals San Jose Sharks. To begin the 2010–11 season, the Stars won their first three games in a row, going on a three-game win streak for the first time since the 2008–09 season by beating the New Jersey Devils 4–3 in overtime in the season opener on October 8, 2010, New York Islanders 5–4 in a shootout on October 9, and against the Red Wings in the Stars' home opener on October 14, respectively. The home opener against the Red Wings featured an emotional return for Mike Modano, as the Stars crowd gave Modano a standing ovation as he was shown on the American Airlines Center jumbotron during a timeout in the game. After a hot start to the season, the Stars would continue to dominate within the first 50 games of the season, staying in both the Pacific Division lead and within the top three spots of the Western Conference. Through the first 50 games of the season up until the All-Star Break, they compiled a 30–15–5 record. However, after the All-Star Break the Stars went into a slump, going on numerous losing streaks which included one-goal losses and blowing late leads in numerous games. Through this though, the Stars still remained in the playoff picture. On the day of the trade deadline (February 28, 2011), the Stars traded up and comer James Neal and Matt Niskanen to the Pittsburgh Penguins in exchange for defenseman Alex Goligoski. Despite these late-season struggles, the Stars still had a chance to make the playoffs by winning their season finale in regulation or overtime on April 10, as they lost on the road at the Minnesota Wild 5–3 and a 42–29–11 record, costing them the last playoff spot despite the winning record and a vastly improved season overall compared to the previous two seasons, finishing 9th in the Western Conference only two points behind the defending Stanley Cup champion Chicago Blackhawks for the eighth and final playoff spot. After missing the playoffs for the third consecutive season, Dallas fired coach Marc Crawford after just one season with the club on April 12.

=== 2011–present: Arrival of Tom Gaglardi and "Victory Green" era ===
==== 2011–2013: Continued team struggles ====
To start the 2011 off-season, according to Darren Dreger of TSN, the team had been "financially managed" by the league for over a year. On June 16, 2011, Dallas hired Glen Gulutzan to be head coach, making him the sixth coach since the franchise's move from Minnesota. On September 13, 2011, lenders voted to agree to have the Stars file for bankruptcy and sold at auction. On September 21, 2011, Mike Modano announced his retirement from the league. By October 22, 2011, competing bids to buy the club were due. Vancouver businessman and Kamloops Blazers owner Tom Gaglardi's bid was the only one submitted, clearing the way for him to enter the final stages of taking over ownership of the team. Gaglardi's purchase was approved by the NHL Board of Governors on November 18, 2011. A bankruptcy court judge approved the bid for an enterprise value of $240 million. First lien creditors got about 75 cents on the dollar. The Stars lost $38 million during their last fiscal year and $92 million over the last three seasons.

As the new owner, Gaglardi's first move was bringing back former Stars President Jim Lites to once again take the reins as team president and CEO. To begin the 2011–12 season, the Stars once again jumped out to a fast start, going 23-17-1 through the first 41 games of the season. However, when the second half of the season began, the Stars slumped through the months of January and February, before getting hot again in late February. Throughout March, the Stars regained the lead of the Pacific Division. Beginning on March 26, 2012, the Stars embarked on a western road trip that saw them visit the Calgary Flames, Edmonton Oilers, Vancouver Canucks and San Jose Sharks. Going into the road trip, the Stars were in control of their own destiny, having to gain four points on the road trip to win their first Pacific Division title since the 2005–06 season. After the Stars lost 5–4 in Calgary to the Flames on March 26, the Stars beat the Oilers two nights later, 3–1. This would be their last win of the season, as the Stars were rolled over by the Canucks and Sharks the next two games. The Stars were eliminated from playoff contention on April 5 in a 2–0 loss to the playoff-bound Nashville Predators. Despite a winning record once again of 42–35–5 record, the team failed to qualify for the playoffs for the fourth consecutive year missing the 2012 playoffs by six points, setting a franchise record for consecutive seasons without a playoff appearance.

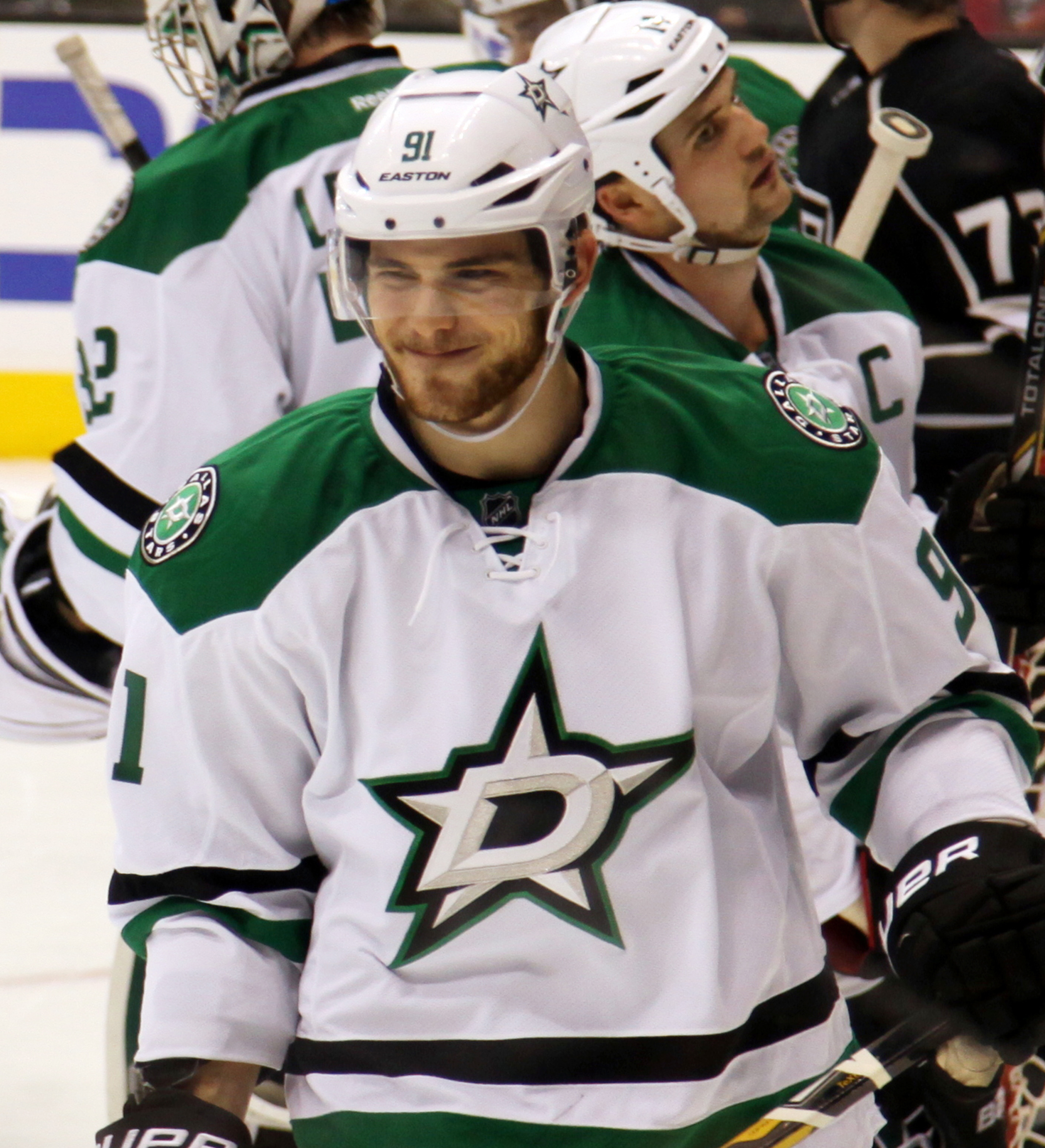
Tyler Seguin with the Stars in the 2013–14 season. The Stars acquired Seguin as a part of a seven-player trade with the Boston Bruins during the 2013 off-season.

On July 1, 2012, the team signed free agent veterans Jaromír Jágr, Ray Whitney, and Aaron Rome. The next day, the Stars traded fan-favorite Steve Ott and Adam Pardy to the Buffalo Sabres in exchange for center Derek Roy. When the 2012–13 NHL lockout ended in January 2013 and a 48-game season began the Stars embarked on an up-and-down season, though staying in the race for one of the eight Western Conference playoff spots most of the shortened season. In mid-season, forward Michael Ryder was traded to his former team, the Montreal Canadiens, for Erik Cole. This shocked many as Ryder has become an almost overnight fan-favorite to Stars fans in his time with Dallas thanks to his stellar 35-goal campaign the previous season in 2011–12. Before the trade deadline in early April, the Stars began to falter and team captain Brenden Morrow was traded to the Pittsburgh Penguins; Roy was traded to the Vancouver Canucks; Jágr to the Boston Bruins; and Tomáš Vincour to the Colorado Avalanche to close out the NHL trade deadline, all in exchange for draft picks and prospects. After all of the trades at the trade deadline, the Stars' remaining young players pulled together to win six of their next eight games, thus propelling the Stars back into the 2013 playoff race. However, the Stars would drop their final five games, losing all of them while gaining only one point, eliminating them from playoff contention. The Stars had now missed the playoffs for the five straight seasons, continuing to set the all-time record for the franchise (dating back to the franchise's history in Minnesota) for most consecutive seasons without a playoff appearance.

==== 2013–2020: Return to playoff contention and third appearance in the Stanley Cup Final ====
The day after their final regular season game of the 2012–13 season (a 3–0 loss to the Detroit Red Wings), the Stars fired general manager Joe Nieuwendyk. The next day, the Stars introduced their 11th all-time general manager, Jim Nill, the former assistant general manager of the Red Wings. On May 14, 2013, the coaching staff was also fired, and on May 31, 2013, Scott White was re-introduced as the director of hockey operations. The Stars hired Lindy Ruff as their new head coach on June 21, 2013. Nill made his first big trade as general manager when he acquired the former second overall draft pick from the 2010 NHL entry draft in Tyler Seguin, as well as Rich Peverley and Ryan Button from the Boston Bruins in exchange for Loui Eriksson, Reilly Smith, Matt Fraser and Joe Morrow. During the 2013 off-season, the league underwent a major realignment. Dallas' returned to a revamped Central Division, bringing them a much more broadcast-friendly schedule for divisional away games. The Stars had long lobbied for this, as they were unhappy with the large number of games they had to play on the road in the Pacific Time Zone as a member of the Pacific Division since the 1998–99 season. Under new head coach Lindy Ruff and led by 84-point and 79-point campaigns from Seguin and newly minted captain Jamie Benn respectively, the Stars narrowly made it to the 2014 playoffs, returning to the Playoffs for the first time since 2008 with a successful 40–31–11 record, finishing with 91 points, fifth in the Central Division and eighth in the Western Conference during the 2013–14 season. They lost in the first round of the playoffs to the top-seeded Anaheim Ducks in six games with a 5–4 overtime loss in game 6.

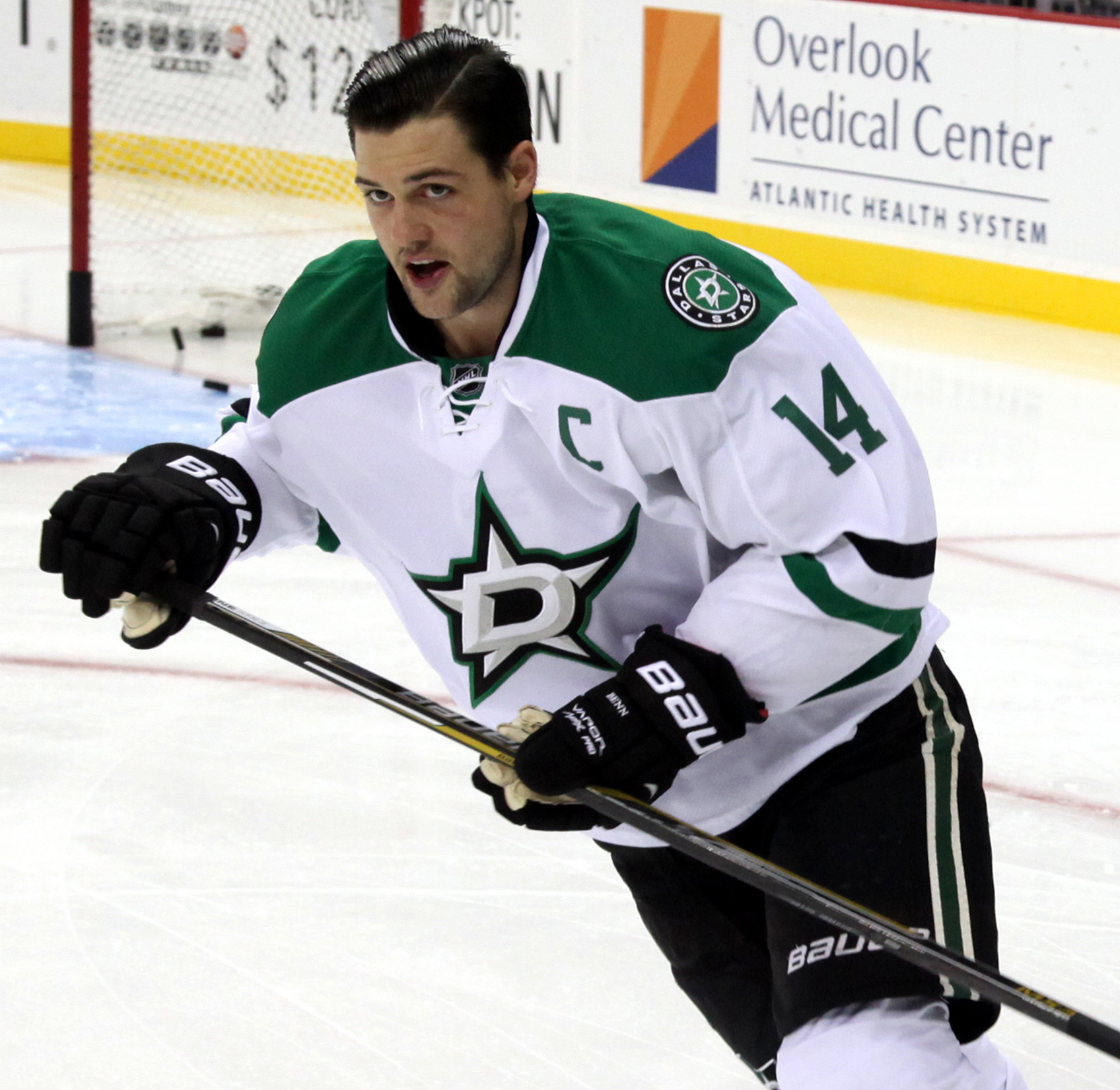
Leading the league in points, Stars' captain Jamie Benn pictured in October 2014. He won the Art Ross Trophy for the 2014–15 season. Benn was also named captain of the Stars before the 2013–14 season.

Nill made another big trade as general manager when he acquired Jason Spezza and Ludwig Karlsson from the Ottawa Senators in exchange for Alex Chiasson, Nick Paul, Alex Guptill and a second-round pick in the 2015 NHL entry draft. He also signed Senators player Aleš Hemský as a free agent on a three-year, $12 million contract on July 1, 2014. Despite these moves and a 92-point 41–31–10 campaign, the Stars finished with the second-lowest goaltender save percentage in the league during the 2014–15 season, which resulted in them failing to qualify for the 2015 playoffs due to their sixth-place finish in the Central Division and being seven points behind of the last playoff spot. The lone bright spot of the 2014–15 season was captain Jamie Benn winning the Art Ross Trophy. On April 11, 2015, Benn scored four points in the Stars' last regular season game to finish with 87 points on the season and win the Art Ross Trophy. His final point, a secondary assist with 8.5 seconds left in regulation in the game, allowed him to overtake New York Islanders centre and captain John Tavares for the award by one point.

In the 2015 off-season the Stars made a couple additions to the team, first trading with the Chicago Blackhawks for three-time Stanley Cup champion Patrick Sharp as well as defenseman Stephen Johns in exchange for Trevor Daley and Ryan Garbutt. The Stars also signed via free agency Sharp's teammate from the Blackhawks Johnny Oduya to a two-year contract. In the 2015–16 season, the Stars won their first Central Division title since 1998 and posted the best regular season record in the Western Conference with a 50–23–9 record good enough for 109 points and the runner up to the Presidents' Trophy as the regular season champions, only behind the Washington Capitals. In the first round of the 2016 playoffs, they defeated the Minnesota Wild in six games. In the second round, they faced the St. Louis Blues in the playoffs for the first time since 2001, but lost the series in seven games.

The Stars finished with a 34–37–11 record in an injury-plagued 2016–17 season, missing the playoffs for the seventh time in the past nine seasons, missing the 2017 playoffs by 15 points. As a result, the team announced that head coach Lindy Ruff's contract would not be renewed.

In the 2017 off-season the Stars lost goaltender Antti Niemi and forward Patrick Sharp in free agency.

Ken Hitchcock returned as head coach for the 2017–18 season, however once again the Stars missed the playoffs, this time narrowly missing having only missed by just three points in the standings after posting a winning record of 42–32–8 in the season.

Hitchcock retired after the season and was succeeded at the head coaching spot by Jim Montgomery. Montgomery's first season as the Stars coach saw the team finish with a 43–32–7 record, good enough to return to the playoffs for the first time since 2016 as the first wild card team and seventh seed in the Western Conference. The Stars defeated the Central Division champion and second-seeded Nashville Predators in a six-game series the first round, but fell to the sixth-seeded and eventual Stanley Cup champion St. Louis Blues in seven games, losing game 7 on the road in double-overtime by a score of 2–1 despite a 52-save performance by starting goaltender Ben Bishop.

Going into the 2019–20 season, the Stars added veteran forwards Joe Pavelski from the San Jose Sharks and Corey Perry of the Anaheim Ducks in free agency on July 1, 2019. To start the 2019–20 season, the Stars sputtered to a 1–7–1 start through their first nine games. However the Stars soon rallied and rattled off a 14–1–1 record between October 19 and November 25, which catapulted the Stars to an eventual season record of 37–24–8 through 69 games, as the regular season was suspended in March 2020 due to the COVID-19 pandemic. Barely two full months into his second season as Stars head coach, on December 10, the Stars fired head coach Jim Montgomery for "unprofessional conduct inconsistent with the core values and beliefs of the Dallas Stars and the National Hockey League." General manager Jim Nill said the situation had come to light the previous weekend, and involved "a material act of unprofessionalism" egregious enough to demand Montgomery's immediate firing. He did not offer specifics "out of respect for everyone involved," only saying that it did not involve abuse of players or criminal conduct. Rick Bowness, who joined the team as an assistant coach a month after Montgomery's hiring in May 2018, was named interim coach, while Derek Laxdal, who was the head coach of the Stars' AHL affiliate Texas Stars at the time, would be promoted to the assistant coaching position that was vacated by Bowness. On January 1, 2020, the Stars hosted the Nashville Predators in the 2020 Winter Classic at the Cotton Bowl in a rematch of the previous seasons' first-round playoff series, where the Stars prevailed with a 4–2 victory. This was the first NHL outdoor game for both teams and with a sold-out crowd of 85,630 at the Cotton Bowl, it was the second-most attended game in NHL history. The NHL returned from the March 2020 abrupt regular season stoppage three weeks before completion due to the COVID-19 pandemic a little under five months later in August 2020, where the Stars advanced to the playoffs. By virtue of having one of the top four highest point percentages in the Western Conference at the time the season was suspended, the Stars played in a round-robin tournament against three of the other top four teams in the Western Conference (Vegas Golden Knights, Colorado Avalanche, and St. Louis Blues) in order to determine the team's seed for the playoffs; Dallas was ultimately seeded as the no. 3 seed in the Western Conference, entering them into a first-round series against the Calgary Flames. The Stars defeated the Flames in six games in the first round, and then defeated the Colorado Avalanche in a seven-game series that ended with a Joel Kiviranta hat-trick performance in game 7, which included his series-winning overtime goal. The Stars would defeat the Vegas Golden Knights in five games in the conference finals to advance to the Stanley Cup Final for the first time since 2000, as the Stars would end a second consecutive series of the playoffs with a series-winning overtime goal when Denis Gurianov scored 3:36 into the first overtime period of game 5, winning the game 3–2 for the Stars. The Stars would go on to face the Eastern Conference champion Tampa Bay Lightning in the Stanley Cup Final, the Stars won game 1 of the series by a 4–1 score, but would eventually fall to the Lightning in six games.

==== 2020–present: Runs to the Western Conference finals ====
A month after the Stars' run to the 2020 Stanley Cup Final, interim head coach Rick Bowness was named full-time head coach on October 29, 2020. In the following season, an injury-plagued campaign for the team (most notably with veteran forwards Tyler Seguin and Alexander Radulov along with veteran goaltender Ben Bishop) caused the Stars to finish the COVID-shortened 56-game schedule with a 23–19–14 record, finishing fifth in the Central Division with 60 points and missing the playoffs by four points marking the first time since 2018 where the team failed to qualify for a playoff spot.

The Stars would rebound in the 2021–22 season with a 98-point 46–30–6 record, good enough for the first wild-card spot and seventh seed in the Western Conference playoffs where they played the Pacific Division champion and second-seeded Calgary Flames in the first round. They were defeated by the Flames in seven games, losing 3–2 in overtime of game 7 in Calgary. In game 7 the Stars took the game to overtime despite the Flames making twice as many shots and attempts as the Stars, with the Stars' young starting netminder Jake Oettinger recording 64 saves, the second-highest in playoff history behind only Kelly Hrudey's 73 during the 1987 Easter Epic. The Stars were eliminated when Flames forward Johnny Gaudreau finally scored 15:09 into the first overtime period to end the game 3–2. After the team's playoff elimination, head coach Rick Bowness announced that he would be resigning from his coaching duties with the team.

On June 21, 2022, the Stars hired Peter DeBoer to replace Bowness as their head coach, the 10th in franchise history since the team moved to Dallas in 1993. In the 2022 off-season the Stars added in free agency both forward Mason Marchment, and defenseman Colin Miller, however lost veteran defenseman John Klingberg to the Anaheim Ducks via free agency after eight seasons with the Stars. Led by their trio of veteran forwards Tyler Seguin, Joe Pavelski, and captain Jamie Benn, as well as the emergence of a young core of players including netminder Jake Oettinger, forwards Jason Robertson, Roope Hintz, and Wyatt Johnston, and defenseman Miro Heiskanen, the Stars completed their first season under Peter DeBoer with a 108-point 47–21–14 regular season record, just barely being beat out by the Colorado Avalanche by one point for the 2022–23 Central Division title. In only his third full season with the Stars and fourth season altogether, Jason Robertson set a new Dallas Stars record for total points in a season with 109 points, surpassing the previous record of 93 points set by Mike Modano in the Stars' first season in Dallas back in 1993–94. Robertson accomplished this feat in a game against the Arizona Coyotes on March 31, 2023, when he scored a goal as part of a Stars 5–2 win over the Coyotes, his goal was his record-breaking 94th point of the season and 100th goal of his career. Captain Jamie Benn also had a resurgent season, finishing with a 78-point season that included 33 goals and 45 assists recorded in all 82 contests played for a season nicknamed by both Stars fans and pundits alike as the "Bennaissance" for his first 75-plus point season since 2017–18. Along with trade deadline acquisitions Max Domi, and Evgenii Dadonov, the Stars entered the 2023 playoffs as the number two seed in the Central Division, matching them up in a first round series against the Minnesota Wild for their first playoff series versus one another since 2016. The Stars opened the playoffs at home with a double-overtime loss in game 1, as nearly midway through regulation of game 1 Joe Pavelski was knocked out with a concussion for the remainder of the first round series on a hit by Wild defenseman Matt Dumba. The Stars responded with a win in game 2 fueled by a Roope Hintz hat-trick performance, winning four of the next five games in the series after game 1 to eliminate the Wild in six games. The Stars then faced the Seattle Kraken in the second round of the playoffs. The Kraken, in only their second season of existence, had upset the defending Stanley Cup champion Colorado Avalanche in the first round in seven games. Pavelski returned to the Stars for game 1 of the series, scoring all four of the Stars' goals in the game, however the Stars lost by a score of 5–4 in overtime. The Stars would go on to win the series, winning game 7 at home by a score of 2–1, sending the Stars to the conference finals and setting up a rematch of the 2020 conference finals versus the Vegas Golden Knights. The Stars would immediately go down 3–0 in the series versus Vegas after dropping the first two games in overtime on the road and a 4–0 loss at home in game 3. In game 3 captain Jamie Benn was suspended for two games for an illegal cross-check on Vegas captain Mark Stone. Though the Stars would win games 4 and 5 without Benn and extend the series, the eventual Stanley Cup champion Golden Knights would ultimately defeat the Stars in six games with a 6–0 win in game 6.

The next season saw the Stars clinch their fourth Central Division title and finished as the top seed in the Western Conference and placed second in the League overall as the runner up for the Presidents' Trophy, only behind the New York Rangers. They defeated the defending Stanley Cup champion and eighth-seeded Vegas Golden Knights in seven games in the first round of the 2024 playoffs, then defeated the Colorado Avalanche in six games in the second round, and then lost to the Edmonton Oilers in six games in the conference finals.

== Team information ==
=== Arena ===
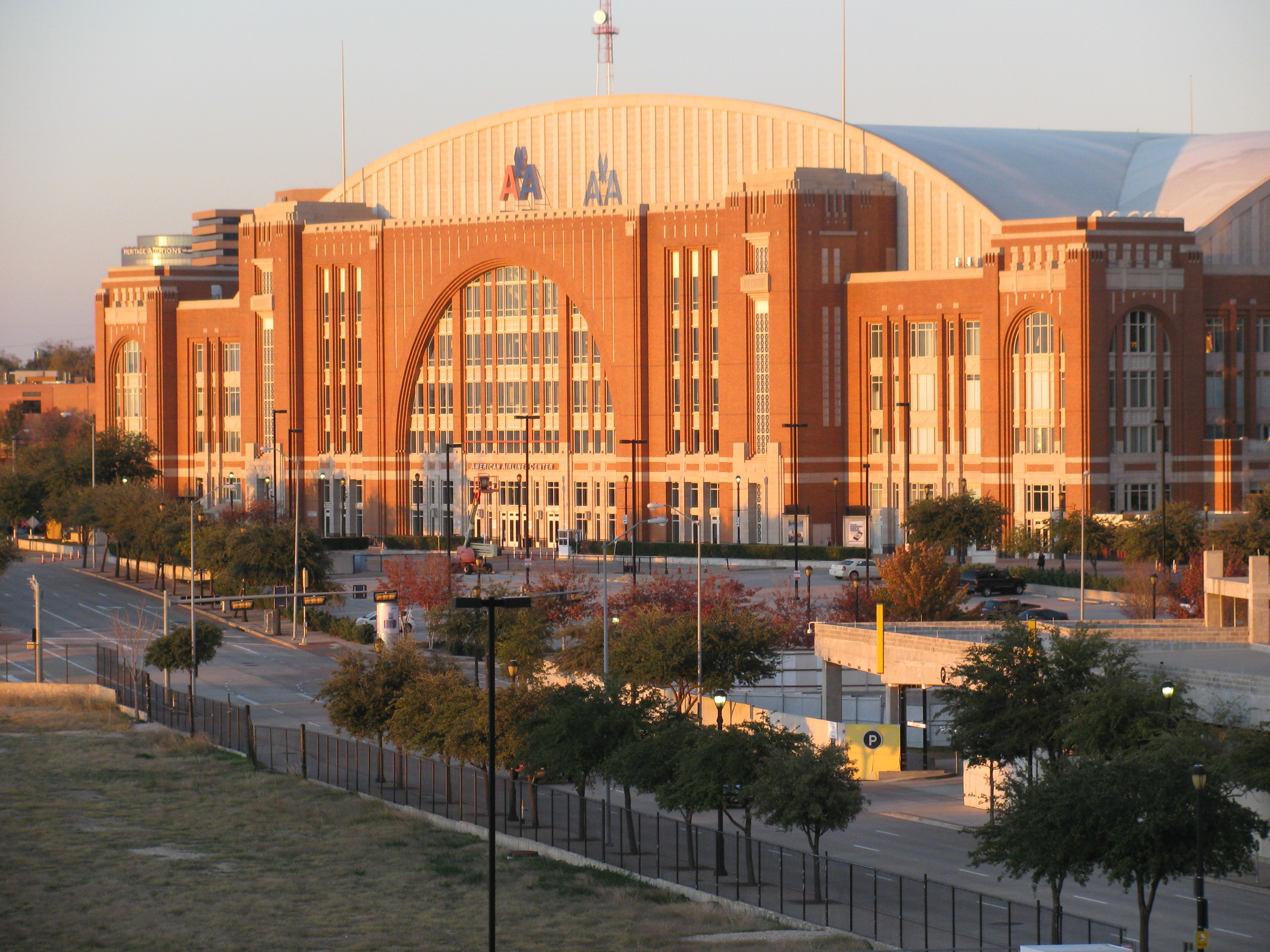
American Airlines Center is the second, and current home arena used by the Dallas Stars.

When the Stars first moved from Minnesota, they played in Reunion Arena, which they shared with the National Basketball Association's Dallas Mavericks. For hockey, Reunion Arena held 17,001 for NHL games. Throughout the hockey history of Reunion Arena, the arena was known for having one of the worst ice surfaces in the league, especially in its final days hosting the Stars. The Stars played at Reunion for eight years, from 1993 to 2001. Before the 2001–02 NHL season, both the Stars and the Mavericks moved into the new American Airlines Center, which is in the Victory Park neighborhood of Dallas, just north of Reunion Arena. American Airlines Center holds 18,584 for Stars and NHL games. On January 24, 2007, the AAC hosted the 2007 National Hockey League All-Star Game. The AAC and the Dallas Stars have won several local and NHL awards for the "Best Fan Experience".

In October 2024, tensions between the Stars and Mavericks began to rise following disputes over arena upgrades that the Mavericks wished to make, but which the Stars would not agree to pay for. The Mavericks sent the Stars a letter outlining claims that the organization had breached the terms of the agreement signed in 1999 between the two teams and the city of Dallas and had therefore forfeited its interests in Center Operating Company, the arena management company that had been jointly owned and operated by the two teams since the AAC's opening. Included with the letter was $110 to buy out the Stars' portion of Center Operating Company. The Stars returned the money and ignored the claims, but the relationship between the two organizations continued to deteriorate. On October 28, 2025, the Mavericks filed a lawsuit alleging that the Stars had breached their contract, which stipulated that both teams' headquarters must remain in Dallas, by moving their headquarters to Frisco in 2003. The Stars called the act a "hostile takeover" and immediately filed a countersuit the following day, alleging that the Mavericks' headquarters were located in Las Vegas. Judge Bill Whitehill of the Texas Business Court ultimately ruled in the Mavericks' favor, allowing them to redeem the Stars' "entire interests" in the company operating the AAC and ordering all of the Stars' designated board members to be terminated from the company. The Stars appealed the ruling.

On June 2, 2026, as a result of the ongoing legal battles, the Stars announced plans to build a new arena in Plano, Texas, as part of a proposed sports and entertainment district at The Shops at Willow Bend. On July 8, the Plano City Council approved a $700 million building plan for a new arena to host the Stars. During the same time period, the Mavericks had announced plans to build a new arena at the former Valley View Mall site in North Dallas. On August 17, with both organizations set to vacate the AAC in the near-term future but needing a venue for the next few seasons, the Mavericks and Stars reached a settlement outside of court. The full terms of the settlement were not publicly disclosed, but it was announced that both teams would remain in the AAC through 2031.

On November 3rd 2026, Plano voters rejected funding for the proposed Stars arena. Opposition to the new arena continued during a city council meeting on November 9th.

=== Broadcast ===
All Dallas Stars games are broadcast on radio on KTCK and its FM simulcast under a five-year deal announced in January 2009. KTCK replaced WBAP, which had broadcast games since the beginning of the 1994 season after KLIF has broadcast the first season in Dallas in 1993. Television coverage occurs on Amazon Prime Video, after the Stars' former broadcast partner, Victory+, experienced significant financial difficulties.

The Stars, along with the Buffalo Sabres and Carolina Hurricanes are one of only three NHL teams to simulcast the entirety of their games on TV and radio, which the team has done since their 1993 arrival in Dallas. The original broadcast team from 1993 to 1996 was Mike Fornes (play-by-play) and Ralph Strangis (color). Fornes left the broadcast team after the 1995–96 season; Strangis moved to the play-by-play role and color commentator Daryl "Razor" Reaugh was added. Although both the DFW area's large media market and the team's fan base could theoretically support separate television and radio broadcast teams, the Stars have continued simulcasting due to the popularity of "Ralph and Razor" (as they are known) among local listeners and viewers. Like most professional teams, the Stars also transmit the play-by-play on a low-power station inside American Airlines Center on 97.5 FM to avoid the broadcast delay caused by sending the network's audio to KTCK, then to its AM and FM transmitters, along with the station's AM radio signal being overwhelmed by the arena's overall electronics.

Strangis retired from the booth after the 2014–15 season and was replaced by Dave Strader. In June 2016, Strader was diagnosed with cholangiocarcinoma, a fairly rare and aggressive form of cancer of the bile duct. To begin the 2016–17 season, Reaugh assumed play-by-play duties while Strader underwent treatment. Studio analyst and former Stars defenseman, Craig Ludwig, took over as color commentator. During a break in Strader's treatment, he returned to the broadcast booth on February 18, 2017, a 4–3 overtime home win against the Tampa Bay Lightning. After the game, the Stars saluted Strader at center ice. On October 1, 2017, Strader died of cancer at age 62, leaving Reaugh and Ludwig to call the 2017–18 season. In July 2018, the Stars announced that Reaugh would return to color commentary for the 2018–19 season, with former studio host Josh Bogorad taking over the play-by-play.

On July 3, 2024, Diamond Sports Group, the owner of Bally Sports Southwest agreed to terminate their contract with the Stars. Five days later, the Stars announced a deal with tech company A Parent Media Co, Inc., which would broadcast games for free on a new streaming service known as Victory+. The Stars also reached agreements with KDFI and KDFW to simulcast selected Stars games on broadcast television.

In September 2026, the Stars departed Victory+ amid financial difficulties being faced by the service, and announced they would move to Amazon Prime Video for the upcoming season. Stars games will be available to Amazon Prime subscribers within the team's market, and 17 games will be simulcast on broadcast television.

=== Logo and jersey design ===
When they debuted in Dallas for the 1993–94 season, they kept the same uniform design from their later Minnesota days, except for the addition of the Texas logo patch on the shoulders. Away uniforms were black and home uniforms were white. With minor trim changes, a darker shade of green, and the word 'Dallas' added in the 1994–95 season, they kept this original design until after their 1999 Stanley Cup-winning campaign. During this time the black pants included the word "Dallas" in gold run through the sides with green stripes.

In the 1997–98 season, the Stars introduced an alternate uniform that partly resembled those worn during the NHL All-Star Game at the time. The uniform was mostly green on top and black at the bottom, in a star-shaped design. For the 1999–2000 season, it became the primary away uniform, and was paired with a new home uniform featuring the same basic design, with white on top and green at the bottom. They kept this design until the 2006–07 season, during which the league switched color designations on home and away jerseys in the 2003–04 season. The striping was also eliminated on the black pants. The Stars introduced an alternate jersey for the 2003–04 season that proved both embarrassing and unpopular to critics and fans. The uniform, which introduced a red as a new trim color, was black with a green bottom and featured a modern representation of the constellation Taurus topped by a trailing green star with red trail marks. However, fans and critics derided the uniform crest for its resemblance to a uterus, nicknaming it the "Mooterus." The uniform was used until the 2005–06 season.

With the switch to the Reebok Edge uniform system, the jerseys underwent a complete redesign. The home black jersey, introduced for the 2007–08 season, features the player's number on the chest and an arched 'Dallas' in white with gold trim, with the primary logo on the shoulders. The primary away jerseys, which were used from 2007 to 2010 and was used as an alternate for its final season, had the Stars logo crest in front and the uniform number on the top right, with the Texas alternate logo on the shoulders. An alternate white jersey based on the home black jersey was introduced for the 2008–09 season; they became the regular away uniforms for the 2010–11 season. The lettering is in green with gold and black trim. Both uniforms were used until the 2012–13 season.

A new logo and uniforms were introduced for the 2013–14 season. Silver replaced gold as the tertiary color, while green (in a new shade called "Victory Green," similar to the old North Stars' shade of green) was reintroduced as a primary uniform color. The new logo features the letter D centering a star, symbolizing Dallas' nickname as "The Big D." The home uniforms are in green with black and white striping, while the away uniforms are in white with a green shoulder yoke, and black and green striping. The inner collar features the team name on the home uniforms, and the city name on the away uniforms. The secondary logo, with the primary inside a roundel with the team name, is featured in the shoulders. This design was retained when Adidas took over as uniform supplier before the 2017–18 season, except "Victory Green" replaced "Stars" and "Dallas" on the inner collar of the home and away uniforms respectively.

The Stars unveiled a special-edition uniform for the 2020 Winter Classic, featuring a design inspired from the defunct Dallas Texans of the United States Hockey League (USHL). The uniform has the word "Stars" (with the star substituting for the letter A) in the middle of the big letter "D". Both are in white with silver trim. A silhouette of the state of Texas in silver and green trim with the letter "D" inside adorns the left sleeve.

For the 2020–21 season, the Stars added a black alternate uniform with neon green accents (presumably in honor of the Bank of America Plaza tower in downtown Dallas) featuring the alternate "Texas D" logo in front. A neon green star is added on the left side of the collar, symbolizing Texas' "Lone Star State" nickname. Numbers are in 3D-accented black with neon green accents. The Stars also released a "Reverse Retro" alternate uniform for the 2020–21 season in collaboration with Adidas, bringing back the 1999–2007 uniform design but with the current color scheme in place of the original green, gold and black colors. The design also featured white pants. A second "Reverse Retro" alternate was released in the 2022–23 season, using the 1993–94 black uniform but with the current Victory Green and silver stripes.

The Stars unveiled a new alternate uniform during the 2025–26 season. This design was patterned after the All-Star Game-inspired green uniforms they wore from 1997 to 2007, but recolored to a black base with green and silver accents. The set was nicknamed "The '99" in homage to the Stars' 1999 Stanley Cup victory in these uniforms; as such, they paired the uniforms with black pants that featured a vertical "DALLAS" in silver with green stripes, replicating the set they wore as an alternate that season.

A "Hometown Remix" uniform was unveiled during the 2026–27 season, featuring a white base and neon green-trimmed black numbers. A modified version of the D-star crest featured alternating black and neon stripes.

=== Minor league affiliates ===
The Texas Stars, based in Cedar Park, are the Stars current American Hockey League affiliate.

The Dallas Stars are presently affiliated with two minor league teams. The Texas Stars are the American Hockey League (AHL) affiliate of the Dallas Stars, who after becoming unaffiliated with the Iowa Stars in 2008, did not have an AHL affiliate for the 2008–09 season. The Texas Stars began play in the AHL in the 2009–10 season as an affiliate for Dallas. They are located in Cedar Park, Texas (northwest of Austin).

In addition to their AHL affiliate, the Dallas Stars are also affiliated with the Idaho Steelheads of the ECHL. Based in Boise, the Steelheads play home games at the Idaho Central Arena since 2003.

=== Traditions ===
Since the 2005–06 season, national anthems are performed by Celena Rae, a Fort Worth native and a former semifinalist on American Idol. During "The Star-Spangled Banner", the fans yell the team name "stars" in the lines "whose broad stripes and bright stars" and "O say does that star spangled banner yet wave". At games, as part of the entertainment, a Kahlenberg KDT-123 fog horn sounds after every Stars goal.

When the Stars take the ice at the beginning of each game, the song "Puck Off" (also referred to as the "Dallas Stars Fight Song") by Pantera, is played in the arena. Members of the band, who are from the Dallas–Fort Worth–Arlington metropolitan area, had become friends with members of the Stars in the 1990s, especially following the team's Stanley Cup win in 1999. "Puck Off" later also became the team's goal celebration song. During the song, fans chant the only lyrics in the song, "Dallas! Stars! Dallas! Stars!" while pumping their fists in the air. After a penalty on the opposing team is announced, the Stars public address announcer shouts, "Your Dallas Stars are on...the..." and the fans finish the chant by yelling the words "power play!", immediately after which a clip of the Muse song "Knights of Cydonia" is played. After each Stars win, the song "The House is a Rockin'" by Stevie Ray Vaughan (a Dallas native) and Double Trouble is played. A song of unknown origin called "The Darkness Music" is played after nearly every away goal. In recent years, fans have usually yelled, "Who cares!?" after away team goals are announced by the public address announcer.

The Stars have hosted a home game on New Year's Eve most years since 1997, the exceptions being 2004, 2012, 2019, 2020 and 2021. The first was due to the season being canceled in the 2004–05 NHL lockout; the second was because the season was delayed by the 2012–13 NHL lockout; the third was due to the Stars' participation in the 2020 Winter Classic; the fourth was due to the delayed off-season caused by the COVID-19 pandemic; and the 2021 game was postponed to February 13, 2022 due to a team-wide COVID-19 outbreak. For a period of time, the game coincided with the Big D NYE celebration (now on hiatus) on the south side of the arena in AT&T Plaza.

== Season-by-season record ==
This is a partial list of the last five seasons completed by the Stars. For the full season-by-season history, see List of Dallas Stars seasons.

Note: GP = Games played, W = Wins, L = Losses, OTL = Overtime losses, Pts = Points, GF = Goals for, GA = Goals against

Season	GP	W	L	OTL	Pts	GF	GA	Finish	Playoffs
2021–22	82	46	30	6	98	238	246	4th, Central	Lost in first round, 3–4 (Flames)
2022–23	82	47	21	14	108	285	218	2nd, Central	Lost in conference finals, 2–4 (Golden Knights)
2023–24	82	52	21	9	113	298	234	1st, Central	Lost in conference finals, 2–4 (Oilers)
2024–25	82	50	26	6	106	277	224	2nd, Central	Lost in conference finals, 1–4 (Oilers)
2025–26	82	50	20	12	112	279	226	2nd, Central	Lost in first round, 2–4 (Wild)

== Players and personnel ==
=== Current roster ===
Updated November 9, 2026

No.	Nat	Player	Pos	S/G	Age	Acquired	Birthplace
10	(Sweden)	Oskar Bäck	C	L	26	2018	Karlstad, Sweden
14	(Canada)	Jamie Benn (C)	LW	L	37	2007	Victoria, British Columbia
6	(Switzerland)	Lian Bichsel	D	L	22	2022	Olten, Switzerland
15	(United States)	Colin Blackwell	C	R	33	2024	North Andover, Massachusetts
20	(Canada)	Kyle Capobianco	D	L	29	2024	Mississauga, Ontario
1	(United States)	Casey DeSmith	G	L	35	2024	Rochester, New Hampshire
95	(Canada)	Matt Duchene	C	L	35	2023	Haliburton, Ontario
12	(Czech Republic)	Radek Faksa	C	L	32	2025	Vitkov, Czech Republic
55	(Canada)	Thomas Harley	D	L	25	2019	Syracuse, New York
4	(Finland)	Miro Heiskanen (A)	D	L	27	2017	Espoo, Finland
24	(Finland)	Roope Hintz (A)	C/LW	L	30	2015	Tampere, Finland
49	(Canada)	Justin Hryckowian	C	L	25	2024	L'Île-Bizard, Quebec
25	(Finland)	Arttu Hyry	RW	R	25	2024	Oulu, Finland
53	(Canada)	Wyatt Johnston	C	R	23	2021	Toronto, Ontario
22	(Finland)	Joel Kiviranta	LW	L	30	2026	Vantaa, Finland
23	(Finland)	Esa Lindell (A)	D	L	32	2012	Helsinki, Finland
5	(Sweden)	Nils Lundkvist	D	R	26	2022	Piteå, Sweden
57	(Canada)	Tyler Myers	D	R	36	2026	Houston, Texas
29	(United States)	Jake Oettinger	G	L	27	2017	Lakeville, Minnesota
16	(Canada)	David Perron	RW	R	38	2026	Sherbrooke, Quebec
31	(Canada)	Rémi Poirier	G	L	25	2026	Farnham, Quebec
96	(Finland)	Mikko Rantanen	RW	L	30	2025	Nousiainen, Finland
21	(United States)	Jason Robertson	LW	L	27	2017	Arcadia, California
91	(Canada)	Tyler Seguin (A)	C	R	34	2013	Brampton, Ontario
18	(Canada)	Sam Steel	C	L	28	2023	Ardrossan, Alberta

=== Team captains ===
Note: This list does not include former captains of the Minnesota North Stars and Oakland Seals

- Mark Tinordi, 1993–1995
- Neal Broten, 1995
- Derian Hatcher, 1995–2003
- Mike Modano, 2003–2006
- Brenden Morrow, 2006–2013
- Jamie Benn, 2013–present

=== Hall of Famers ===
The Dallas Stars acknowledge an affiliation with several inductees to the Hockey Hall of Fame: 13 former players and four builders of the sport (former Stars executives and head coaches). Five of the players and three of the builders were connected to the team when it was based in Minnesota (1967–1993). Mike Modano is the only Hall of Fame inductee who played with the franchise before and after it moved to Dallas.

Additionally, two members of the Stars current or former broadcast team have been named recipients of the Hall of Fame's Foster Hewitt Memorial Award for their contributions to ice hockey broadcasting. Former Stars play-by-play announcer Dave Strader was announced as the 2017 award-winner in April of that year, but died before the ceremony could be held in November, leading his sons to accept the award posthumously on his behalf. Longtime Stars color commentator Daryl Reaugh received the award in 2025.

Players

- Ed Belfour
- Leo Boivin (Note: Entire tenure with the franchise occurred when the team was based in Minnesota)
- Guy Carbonneau
- Dino Ciccarelli
- Mike Gartner
- Brett Hull
- Eric Lindros
- Sergei Makarov
- Mike Modano (Note: A portion of their tenure with the franchise occurred when the team was based in Minnesota)
- Larry Murphy
- Joe Nieuwendyk
- Pierre Turgeon
- Gump Worsley
- Sergei Zubov

Builders

- Herb Brooks
- Walter Bush
- Ken Hitchcock
- John Mariucci

Foster Hewitt Memorial Award Winners (Media)

- Dave Strader
- Darryl Reaugh

=== Retired numbers ===
Dallas Stars retired numbers
No.	Player	Position	Career	Date of retirement
7	Neal Broten	C	1981–1995, 1997	February 7, 1998
8	Bill Goldsworthy	RW	1967–1977	February 15, 1992
9	Mike Modano	C	1989–2010	March 8, 2014
19	Bill Masterton	C	1967–1968	January 17, 1987
26	Jere Lehtinen	RW	1995–2010	November 24, 2017
56	Sergei Zubov	D	1996–2009	January 28, 2022

Notes:

- The NHL retired Wayne Gretzky's No. 99 for all its member teams at the 2000 NHL All-Star Game.

=== Dallas Stars Hall of Fame ===
2022

- Derian Hatcher
- Bob Gainey

2023

- Ed Belfour
- Ken Hitchcock

2024

- Brenden Morrow
- Jim Lites

2025

- Joe Nieuwendyk
- Ralph Strangis

=== First-round draft picks ===
Note: This list does not include selections of the Minnesota North Stars.

- 1993: Todd Harvey (9th overall)
- 1994: Jason Botterill (20th overall)
- 1995: Jarome Iginla (11th overall)
- 1996: Ric Jackman (5th overall)
- 1997: Brenden Morrow (25th overall)
- 2000: Steve Ott (25th overall)
- 2001: Jason Bacashihua (26th overall)
- 2002: Martin Vagner (26th overall)
- 2004: Mark Fistric (28th overall)
- 2005: Matt Niskanen (28th overall)
- 2006: Ivan Vishnevskiy (27th overall)
- 2009: Scott Glennie (8th overall)
- 2010: Jack Campbell (11th overall)
- 2011: Jamie Oleksiak (14th overall)
- 2012: Radek Faksa (13th overall)
- 2013: Valeri Nichushkin (10th overall)
- 2013: Jason Dickinson (29th overall)
- 2014: Julius Honka (14th overall)
- 2015: Denis Guryanov (12th overall)
- 2016: Riley Tufte (25th overall)
- 2017: Miro Heiskanen (3rd overall) and Jake Oettinger (26th overall)
- 2018: Ty Dellandrea (13th overall)
- 2019: Thomas Harley (18th overall)
- 2020: Mavrik Bourque (30th overall)
- 2021: Wyatt Johnston (23rd overall)
- 2022: Lian Bichsel (18th overall)
- 2024: Emil Hemming (29th overall)

== Awards and trophies ==
Stanley Cup

- 1998–99

Presidents' Trophy

- 1997–98, 1998–99

Clarence S. Campbell Bowl

- 1998–99, 1999–2000, 2019–20

Art Ross Trophy

- Jamie Benn: 2014–15

Conn Smythe Trophy

- Joe Nieuwendyk: 1998–99

Frank J. Selke Trophy

- Jere Lehtinen: 1997–98, 1998–99, 2002–03

Lester Patrick Trophy

- Neal Broten: 1997–98

Roger Crozier Saving Grace Award

- Ed Belfour: 1999–2000
- Marty Turco: 2000–01, 2002–03

William M. Jennings Trophy

- Ed Belfour and Roman Turek: 1998–99

== Franchise records ==
=== Scoring leaders ===
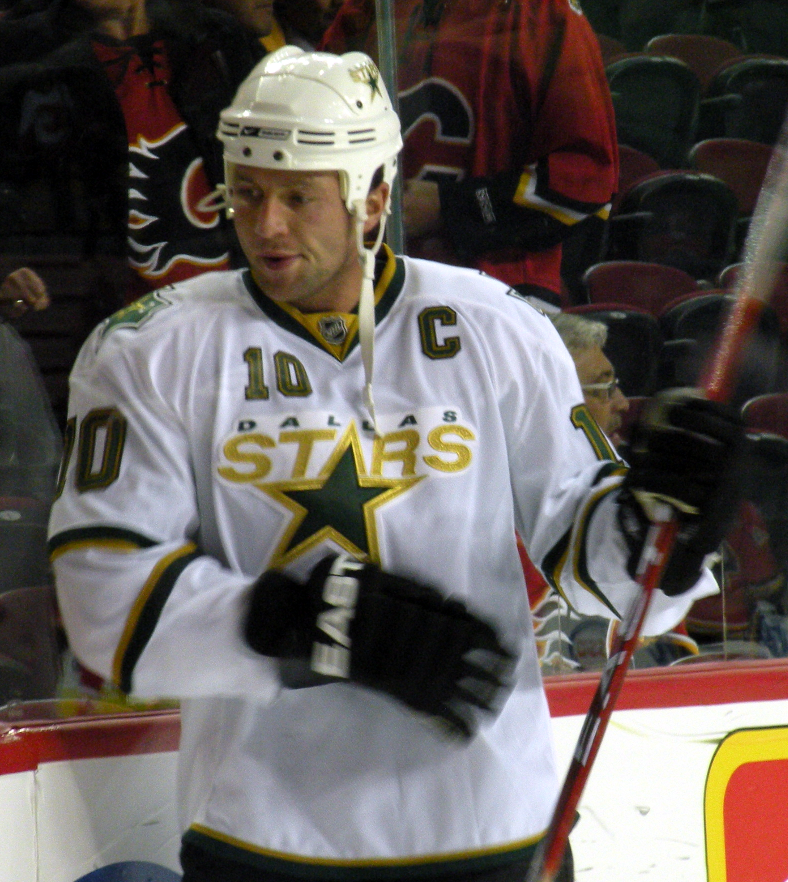
Brenden Morrow is the Stars' tenth all-time points leader. He recorded 528 points playing with the Stars.

These are the top-ten point-scorers in franchise (Minnesota and Dallas) history. Figures are updated after each completed NHL regular season.

- * – current Stars player

Note: Pos = Position; GP = Games played; G = Goals; A = Assists; Pts = Points; P/G = Points per game

Points
Player	Pos	GP	G	A	Pts	P/G
Mike Modano	C	1,459	557	802	1,359	.93
Jamie Benn*	LW	1,252	414	578	992	.79
Neal Broten	C	992	274	593	867	.87
Brian Bellows	LW	753	342	380	722	.96
Tyler Seguin*	C	813	311	394	705	.87
Dino Ciccarelli	RW	602	332	319	651	1.08
Bobby Smith	C	572	185	369	554	.97
Sergei Zubov	D	839	111	438	549	.65
Dave Gagner	C	609	247	287	534	.88
Brenden Morrow	LW	835	243	285	528	.63

Goals
Player	Pos	G
Mike Modano	C	557
Jamie Benn*	LW	414
Brian Bellows	LW	342
Dino Ciccarelli	RW	332
Tyler Seguin*	C	311
Neal Broten	C	274
Bill Goldsworthy	RW	267
Dave Gagner	C	247
Jere Lehtinen	RW	243
Brenden Morrow	LW	243

Assists
Player	Pos	A
Mike Modano	C	802
Neal Broten	C	593
Jamie Benn*	LW	578
Sergei Zubov	D	438
Tyler Seguin*	C	394
Brian Bellows	LW	380
Bobby Smith	C	369
Dino Ciccarelli	RW	319
Tim Young	C	316
Craig Hartsburg	D	315

=== Goaltending leaders ===
These are the top-ten goaltenders in franchise (Minnesota and Dallas) history by wins. Figures are updated after each completed NHL regular season.

- * – current Stars player

Note: GP = Games played; W = Wins; L = Losses; T/O = Ties/Overtime losses; GA = Goal against; GAA = Goals against average; SA = Shots against; SV% = Save percentage; SO = Shutouts

Goaltenders
Player	GP	W	L	T/O	GA	GAA	SA	SV%	SO
Marty Turco	509	262	154	63	1,118	2.31	12,538	.911	40
Kari Lehtonen	445	216	150	50	1,103	2.63	12,558	.912	24
Jake Oettinger*	305	184	78	33	746	2.54	8,276	.910	16
Ed Belfour	307	160	95	44	653	2.19	7,245	.910	27
Cesare Maniago	420	145	190	70	1,283	3.18	13,601	.906	26
Gilles Meloche	327	141	117	52	1,104	3.51	9,661	.886	9
Jon Casey	325	128	126	42	988	3.28	8,985	.890	12
Don Beaupré	315	126	125	45	1,111	3.75	9,576	.884	3
Andy Moog	175	75	64	26	451	2.74	4,677	.904	8
Ben Bishop	143	74	48	11	310	2.33	4,046	.923	14

=== Individual records ===
- Most goals in a season: Dino Ciccarelli; Brian Bellows, 55 (1981–82; 1989–90)
- Most assists in a season: Neal Broten, 76 (1985–86)
- Most points in a season: Bobby Smith, 114 (1981–82)
- Most penalty minutes in a season: Basil McRae, 378 (1987–88)
- Most points in a season, defenseman: Miro Heiskanen, 73 (2022–23)
- Most points in a season, rookie: Neal Broten, 98 (1981–82)
- Most goals in a season, rookie: Neal Broten, 38 (1981–82)*
- Most wins in a season: Marty Turco, 41 (2005–06)
- Most shutouts in a season: Marty Turco, 9 (2003–04)

== See also ==
- List of Dallas Stars head coaches
- List of Dallas Stars players
- List of Minnesota North Stars/Dallas Stars general managers

== Notes ==
Preceded by Detroit Red Wings	Stanley Cup champions 1998–99	Succeeded by New Jersey Devils
