= Les Jackson (ice hockey) =

Canadian ice hockey player, coach, scout, and general manager

- Born: December 21, 1952 (age 73); Manning, Alberta, Canada
- Known for: coach, scout and co-general manager of the Minnesota North Stars/Dallas Stars franchise

Les Jackson (born December 21, 1952) is a Canadian former professional ice hockey player, coach, scout, and current senior advisor to the Florida Panthers. He previously held the position of co-general manager of the Dallas Stars.

== Career ==
Jackson was selected in the 4th round of the 1972 NHL Amateur Draft, 64th overall, by the Boston Bruins.

After a brief minor league playing career, Jackson retired following the 1976–77 season, and was named head coach of the Great Falls Americans of the WHL before the 1979–80 season, his team going 2–25–1, until it folded on December 26, 1979. For the next two seasons, Jackson coached the Brandon Wheat Kings, and then served as their general manager for two seasons following that. Before the 1985–86 season, Jackson joined the Minnesota North Stars as an assistant coach, and stayed with the franchise until September 1, 1999, when he joined the Atlanta Thrashers as assistant general manager.

On July 6, 2000, Jackson rejoined the Dallas Stars, and was named interim co-general manager (along with Brett Hull) on November 13, 2007. On May 22, 2008, the "interim" was removed from their title as both were signed to a 3-year deal to be co-general managers. On May 31, 2009, Jackson and Hull were replaced by Joe Nieuwendyk as general manager, and reassigned to other roles within the Dallas Stars organization.

The Stars did not renew Jackson's contract after its expiration on June 30, 2020, ending what was the longest tenure of any employee in the franchise's history at 33 years. He was also the final team employee in any capacity who still had a direct connection to the franchise's time in Minnesota.

Jackson won a Stanley Cup as an executive with the Florida Panthers in 2024.

Preceded by Doug Armstrong	General Manager of the Dallas Stars; 2007-09 with Brett Hull	Succeeded by Joe Nieuwendyk
