= Joe Nieuwendyk =

Canadian ice hockey player (born 1966)

- Hockey Hall of Fame, 2011
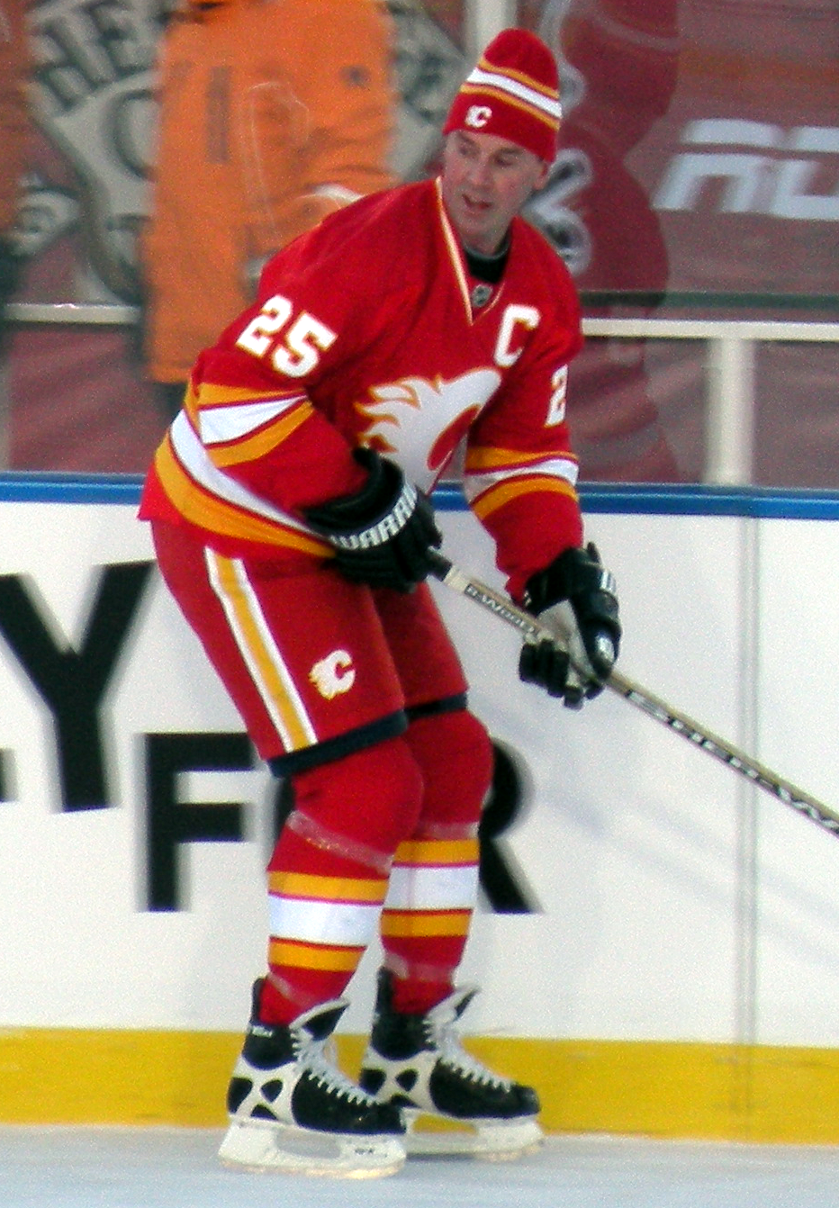
- Nieuwendyk in 2011
- Born: September 10, 1966 (age 60) Oshawa, Ontario, Canada
- Height: 6 ft 2 in (188 cm)
- Weight: 195 lb (88 kg; 13 st 13 lb)
- Position: Centre
- Shot: Left
- Played for: Calgary Flames; Dallas Stars; New Jersey Devils; Toronto Maple Leafs; Florida Panthers
- National team: Canada
- NHL draft: 27th overall, 1985; Calgary Flames
- Playing career: 1987–2006
Medal record
Men's ice hockey
Representing Canada
Gold medal – first place	2002 Salt Lake City
World Junior Championship
Silver medal – second place	1986 Hamilton

Joseph Nieuwendyk (/ˈnjuːəndaɪk/ NEW-ən-dyke; born September 10, 1966) is a Canadian former National Hockey League (NHL) player. He was a second round selection of the Calgary Flames, 27th overall, at the 1985 NHL entry draft and played 20 seasons for the Flames, Dallas Stars, New Jersey Devils, Toronto Maple Leafs, and Florida Panthers. He is one of only 11 players in NHL's history to win the Stanley Cup with three or more different teams, winning titles with Calgary in 1989, Dallas in 1999 and New Jersey in 2003. A two-time Olympian, Nieuwendyk won a gold medal with Team Canada at the 2002 winter games. He was inducted into the Hockey Hall of Fame in 2011 and his uniform number 25 was honoured by the Flames in 2014. He was inducted into the Ontario Sports Hall of Fame in 2014. In 2017, he was named one of the '100 Greatest NHL Players' in history.

An accomplished box lacrosse player, Nieuwendyk led the Whitby Warriors to the 1984 Minto Cup national junior championship before focusing exclusively on hockey. He played university hockey with the Cornell Big Red where he was a two-time All-American. He won the Calder Memorial Trophy as NHL rookie of the year in 1988 after becoming only the second first-year player to score 50 goals. He was a four-time All-Star, won the King Clancy Memorial Trophy in 1995 for his leadership and humanitarian work, and was named the Conn Smythe Trophy winner in 1999 as the most valuable player of the postseason. He played 1,257 games in his career, scoring 564 goals and 1,126 points.

Chronic back pain forced Nieuwendyk's retirement as a player in 2006. He then began a new career in management, acting first as a consultant to the general manager with the Panthers before moving onto the Maple Leafs where he was an assistant to the general manager. He was the general manager of the Dallas Stars between 2009 and 2013. He most recently worked as a pro scout and advisor for the Carolina Hurricanes, until resigning his contract on April 30, 2018.

== Early life ==
Nieuwendyk was born on September 10, 1966, in Oshawa, Ontario, and grew up in Whitby. He is the youngest of four children to Gordon and Joanne Nieuwendyk, who immigrated to Canada from the Netherlands in 1958. Gordon owned a car repair shop in Whitby. Joe grew up in a sporting family. His brother Gil was a box lacrosse player, while his uncle Ed Kea and cousin Jeff Beukeboom also played in the National Hockey League (NHL). Growing up, his best friend was future NHL teammate Gary Roberts.

He played both hockey and lacrosse growing up and the latter considered his better sport. At one point, Nieuwendyk was considered the top junior lacrosse player in Canada. He earned a spot with the Whitby Warriors junior A team at the age of 15, and was named the most valuable player of the Minto Cup tournament in 1984 where he led the Warriors to the national championship. The Ontario Lacrosse Association later named its junior A rookie of the year award after Nieuwendyk.

== Playing career ==
=== College ===
Nieuwendyk went undrafted by any Ontario Hockey League team, so he played a season of junior B for the Pickering Panthers in 1983–84. Eligible for the 1984 NHL entry draft but unselected, he chose to attend Cornell University where he played hockey and lacrosse for the Big Red. He was named the Eastern College Athletic Conference (ECAC) hockey rookie of the year in 1984–85 after scoring 39 points in 23 games. At the 1985 NHL entry draft, the Calgary Flames selected him in the second round, 27th overall, with a pick obtained that day in a trade with the Minnesota North Stars for Kent Nilsson. The disappointment in Calgary over the trade of Nilsson resulted in some criticism of Nieuwendyk's selection, famously leading to a local newspaper to question the moves with the headline "Joe Who?"

Returning to Cornell for the 1985–86 season, Nieuwendyk chose to give up lacrosse in order to focus on hockey. He was named an ECAC first team All-Star in 1985–86 and an NCAA All-American after scoring 42 points in 21 games. In his final season at Cornell, he was named the team's most valuable player and led the ECAC in scoring with 52 points. He was again named an ECAC All-Star and NCAA All-American, and a finalist for the 1987 Hobey Baker Award.

Nieuwendyk chose to forgo his senior year in favour of turning professional. In 81 games with Cornell, Nieuwendyk scored 73 goals and 151 points, both among the highest totals in the school's history. His number 25 jersey was retired by Cornell in 2010, shared with Ken Dryden's number 1 as the first such numbers retired by the hockey team, and believed the first in any sport in the school's varsity sports history. In 2011, he was named one of the 50 greatest players in ECAC history.

=== Calgary Flames ===
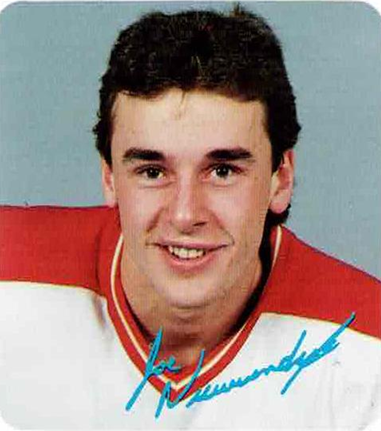
1987 card of Nieuwendyk with the Calgary Flames

Once his junior season at Cornell ended, Nieuwendyk joined the national team for five games before turning professional with the Flames. He made his NHL debut on March 10, 1987, against the Washington Capitals and scored his first NHL goal against goaltender Pete Peeters. He appeared in nine regular season games in the 1986–87 NHL season, scoring five goals and one assist, and appeared in six playoff games. Playing his first full season in 1987–88, he captured the attention of the sports media by scoring 32 goals in his first 42 games to put him on a pace to surpass Mike Bossy's rookie record of 53 goals. He finished two goals short of Bossy's record, but led the team with 51 goals and was the second first-year player to score at least 50 goals in one season. He played in his first NHL All-Star Game, was named to the All-Rookie Team and was voted the winner of the Calder Memorial Trophy as the NHL's top rookie.

Nieuwendyk again scored 51 goals in 1988–89 and marked the 100th of his career in his 144th career game. At the time, he was the third fastest player to reach the milestone, behind Bossy (129 games) and Maurice Richard (134 games), and was the third player in league history to score 50 goals in each of his first two seasons (Bossy and Wayne Gretzky). He led the league with 11 game-winning goals and set a Flames franchise record on January 11, 1989, when he scored five goals in one game against the Winnipeg Jets. He appeared in his second of three-consecutive All-Star Games. In the 1989 Stanley Cup playoffs, he scored 10 goals and four assists to help the Flames win their first- and only -Stanley Cup championship in franchise history. In the clinching game against the Montreal Canadiens, he set up Lanny McDonald's final NHL goal with a quick pass after receiving the puck from Håkan Loob.

A 45-goal season in 1989–90 was enough for Nieuwendyk to lead the team in goal scoring for the third consecutive season. He missed he first 11 games of the 1991–92 NHL season after suffering a knee injury during a summer evaluation camp for the 1991 Canada Cup. Nieuwendyk began the season as the 12th captain in the Flames franchise history. He was limited to 22 goals and 56 points on the season, but scored his 200th career goal on December 3, 1991, against the Detroit Red Wings. His 230th career goal, scored against the Tampa Bay Lightning on November 13, 1992, established a Flames franchise record for career goals (since broken).

Nieuwendyk entered the 1995–96 season unhappy with his contract status. Unable to come to terms with the Flames, he had gone to arbitration, and was awarded a contract worth C$1.85 million, but insisted on renegotiating the deal into a long-term contract extension. He refused an offer of a three-year, $6 million contract from the Flames, and as the dispute dragged on, chose not to join the team when the season began. He remained a holdout until December 19, 1995, when the Flames traded him to the Dallas Stars in exchange for Jarome Iginla and Corey Millen.

=== Dallas Stars ===
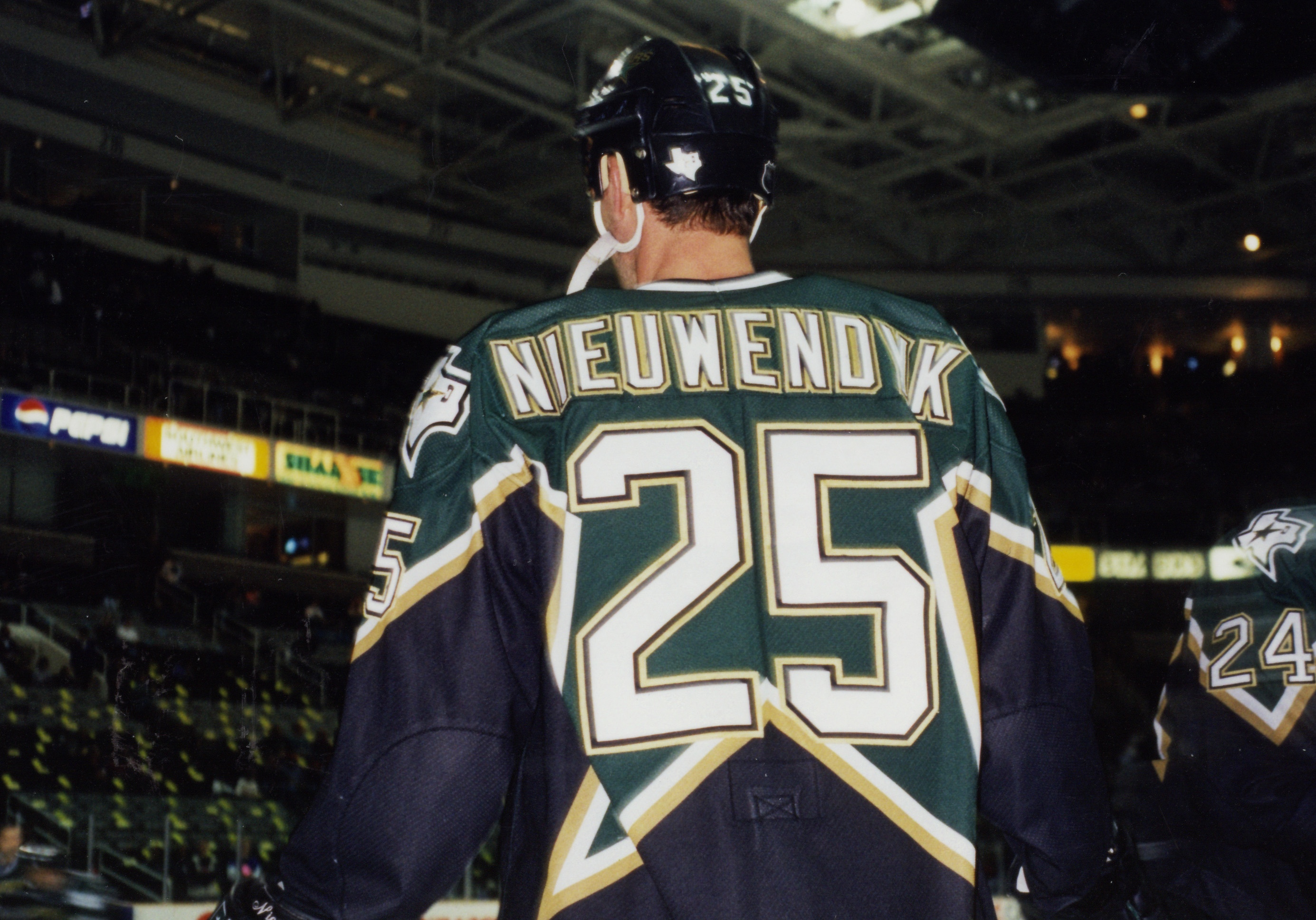
Joe Nieuwendyk, pictured with the Dallas Stars, warming up in San Jose in 1999

The Stars immediately signed Nieuwendyk to a new deal worth US$11.3 million over five years. Bob Gainey, the team's general manager, hoped that the acquisition of Nieuwendyk would help the franchise, which had relocated from Minnesota three years previous, establish its place in Dallas. He scored 14 goals and 32 points in 52 games with the Stars to finish the 1995–96 season.

He improved to 30 goals in 1996–97 despite missing the first month of the season with fractured rib cartilage. A 39-goal season followed, but he was again sidelined by injury after appearing in only one game of the 1998 Stanley Cup playoffs. In the opening game of the Stars' first-round series against the San Jose Sharks, he suffered a torn ACL as a result of a check by Bryan Marchment. The injury required two knee surgeries to repair and six months to heal, which caused him to miss the beginning of the 1998–99 NHL season.

He finished the regular season with 28 goals and 55 points in 67 games, and added 11 goals and 10 assists in the 1999 Stanley Cup playoffs to help the Stars win the first Stanley Cup in their franchise history. Six of his playoff goals were game winners, and he was voted the winner of the Conn Smythe Trophy as most valuable player of the playoffs. Injuries again limited him in 1999–2000. He missed ten games due to a bruised chest then suffered a separated shoulder a week after his return that kept him out of the lineup for several weeks. He played only 47 regular season games, but added 23 more in the playoffs as the Stars reached the 2000 Stanley Cup Final. They lost the series in six games to the New Jersey Devils, however.

Nieuwendyk played in his 1,000th career game on January 20, 2002, against the Chicago Blackhawks. Two months later, on March 19, 2002, he was traded to the Devils, along with Jamie Langenbrunner, in exchange for Jason Arnott, Randy McKay and a first round selection in the 2002 NHL entry draft.

=== New Jersey, Toronto and Florida ===
New Jersey, who had won the Stanley Cup in 2000 and reached the Final the following year, acquired Nieuwendyk for their playoff run in 2002. He scored 11 points in 14 regular season games for the Devils following the trade, but New Jersey was eliminated in the first round of the 2002 Stanley Cup playoffs by the Carolina Hurricanes. He reached two offensive milestones in 2002–03. He scored his 500th career goal on January 17, 2003, against Carolina's Kevin Weekes. On February 23, he scored his 1,000th point in a win over the Pittsburgh Penguins. He and the Devils reached the 2003 Stanley Cup Final, but he suffered a hip injury in the sixth game of the Eastern Conference Final that prevented him from appearing in the championship series. The Devils defeated the Mighty Ducks of Anaheim in the final, capturing the franchise's third Stanley Cup. For him, it was his third title with his third different team.

The Toronto Maple Leafs signed Nieuwendyk to a one-year contract for the 2003–04 season. He scored 22 goals for Toronto in a season marred by abdominal and back injuries that limited him to 64 games played. After scoring two goals in the decisive game seven opening round series victory against the Ottawa Senators, a groin injury that forced him out of the lineup for much of Toronto's second-round series loss to the Philadelphia Flyers. He signed another one-year deal for 2004–05, but the season was cancelled due to a labour dispute that was feared would mark the end of his 38-year-old career.

When NHL play resumed in 2005–06, the Florida Panthers sought to bolster their lineup with veteran players.They signed both Nieuwendyk and Roberts, who had played together in Calgary and Toronto and wanted to finish their careers together, to two-year, $4.5 million contracts. He appeared in 65 games during the season, scoring 26 goals and 56 points. He appeared in 15 games in 2006–07 before chronic back pain forced him onto injured reserve. After missing 14 games, he announced his retirement on December 7, 2006.

== International play ==
As a member of the Canadian national junior team at the 1986 World Junior Ice Hockey Championships, Nieuwendyk scored five goals in seven games to help Canada win a silver medal. His 12 points in the tournament tied him for third in scoring for Team Canada and fourth overall in the tournament. One year later, he joined the senior national team for the Calgary Cup, a four-team exhibition tournament that served as a preview event for the 1988 Winter Olympics. He scored a goal in each of the first two games, losses to the United States and Czechoslovakia, for the Canadian team that won the bronze medal. He joined the senior team again for the 1990 Men's World Ice Hockey Championships, but appeared in only one game after suffering a knee injury. He was invited to Team Canada's summer camp for the 1991 Canada Cup tournament but suffered a knee injury that caused him to miss the entire tournament.

NHL players were first allowed to participate in the Olympic ice hockey tournament in 1998. Nieuwendyk was among the players named to join Canada's "dream team". He scored two goals and three assists in six games, but was one of several Canadian players stopped by Czech goaltender Dominik Hašek in a shootout loss in the semifinal. Canada then dropped a 3–2 decision to Finland to finish fourth. He played alongside Brendan Shanahan and Theoren Fleury on Canada's checking line at the 2002 Olympic tournament. He scored one goal and helped Canada win its first Olympic hockey gold medal in 50 years.

== Playing style ==
Cliff Fletcher, who drafted him into the NHL, described Nieuwendyk as being a "pre-eminent two-way guy who had 50-goal seasons", adding that "he had a great stick around the net, he had a great shot, he saw the ice well, he could skate, he had the size – he had everything you needed to have. History has indicated that wherever he went, the team was competitive. The more that was on the line in big games, the better Joe played." He was an offensive centre in Calgary and power play specialist, able to withstand the physical punishment required to stand in front of the net and battle defencemen for the puck. He led the NHL in power play goals in 1987–88 with 31 and finished in the top ten on four other occasions. Wayne Gretzky, who also played box lacrosse in his youth, argued that the skills Nieuwendyk learned dodging opposing players in that sport aided his development as a hockey player. Nieuwendyk was regarded as a top faceoff man, a skill that Team Canada relied on during the Olympics. He was a checking-line centre at the 2002 Olympics, relied on for his defensive and faceoff abilities.

Nieuwendyk was regarded as a leader throughout his career. He was the captain of the Flames for four seasons, and his teammates in Dallas praised him as a player who would help guide the younger players as they began their careers. His presence was considered an important factor in New Jersey's 2003 Stanley Cup championship. Devils' general manager Lou Lamoriello praised his impact both on and off the ice: "Certainly (the tangibles were) the quality player he was even at that time, how good he was defensively as well as always finding a way to get big goals. It was also about how good he was on faceoffs. And the intangibles, which are really more tangible than anything, are what he brought in the locker room from leadership and unselfishness. It was obvious that when he didn't play he was still so active in his support. He's genuine in every sense of the word. He was a true team player." He was inducted into the Hockey Hall of Fame in 2011, and his uniform number 25 was honoured by the Calgary Flames on March 7, 2014, as he was named to the organization's "Forever a Flame" program.

== Management career ==
Remaining in hockey following the end of his playing career, Nieuwendyk joined the Florida Panthers' front office as a consultant to general manager Jacques Martin in 2007. He left the Panthers after one year to join the Maple Leafs as special assistant to general manager Cliff Fletcher in 2008. He served as assistant general manager for the silver medal-winning Canadian national team at the 2009 World Championships, and on June 1, 2009, was named general manager of the Dallas Stars. His ability to make moves was at times limited by the financial difficulty of team owner Tom Hicks. Among his decisions in his first two seasons as general manager was to allow popular former captain Mike Modano to leave the organization after 22 years with the franchise in 2010. He stated that such moves were difficult, as he played with Modano and considered him a friend. He was released as Stars' general manager at the conclusion of the 2012–13 NHL season as team owner Tom Gaglardi stated that the team wanted to "take this organization in a different direction". On September 3, 2014, the Carolina Hurricanes announced they had hired him as a pro scout and advisor. He resigned from his position with Carolina on April 30, 2018.

== Personal life ==
Nieuwendyk and his wife Tina have two daughters and one son. Jackson Nieuwendyk is presently playing in Penticton, British Columbia, with the Penticton Vees of the British Columbia Hockey League. He is committed to play in the NCAA with Canisius College in Buffalo, New York, for the 2023–2024 NCAA Men's Ice Hockey season.

In 1995, while a member of the Flames, Nieuwendyk won the King Clancy Memorial Trophy given annually to the player "who best exemplifies leadership qualities on and off the ice and who has made a significant humanitarian contribution to his community". He was honoured by the league for his contributions to the Society for the Prevention of Cruelty to Animals (SPCA), and was a spokesman and honorary chairman of the Foothills Hospital Foundation. He remained active with the SPCA after his trade to Dallas, and following the September 11 attacks, organized a charity softball game that raised $115,000 for charitable groups in the aftermath of the attack. While a member of the Maple Leafs during the lockout, he participated in a charity hockey game organized by cancer survivor and former NHL player Keith Acton that raised $30,000 for cancer and leukemia charities in southern Ontario.

== Career statistics ==
=== Regular season and playoffs ===
			Regular season					Playoffs
Season	Team	League	GP	G	A	Pts	PIM	GP	G	A	Pts	PIM
1983–84	Pickering Panthers	OHA Jr. B	38	30	28	58	35	—	—	—	—	—
1984–85	Cornell University	ECAC	29	21	24	45	30	—	—	—	—	—
1985–86	Cornell University	ECAC	21	21	21	42	45	—	—	—	—	—
1986–87	Cornell University	ECAC	23	26	26	52	26	—	—	—	—	—
1986–87	Canadian National Team	Intl	5	2	0	2	0	—	—	—	—	—
1986–87	Calgary Flames	NHL	9	5	1	6	0	6	2	2	4	0
1987–88	Calgary Flames	NHL	75	51	41	92	23	8	3	4	7	2
1988–89	Calgary Flames	NHL	77	51	31	82	40	22	10	4	14	10
1989–90	Calgary Flames	NHL	79	45	50	95	40	6	4	6	10	4
1990–91	Calgary Flames	NHL	79	45	40	85	36	7	4	1	5	10
1991–92	Calgary Flames	NHL	69	22	34	56	55	—	—	—	—	—
1992–93	Calgary Flames	NHL	79	38	37	75	52	6	3	6	9	10
1993–94	Calgary Flames	NHL	64	36	39	75	51	6	2	2	4	0
1994–95	Calgary Flames	NHL	46	21	29	50	33	5	4	3	7	0
1995–96	Dallas Stars	NHL	52	14	18	32	41	—	—	—	—	—
1996–97	Dallas Stars	NHL	66	30	21	51	32	7	2	2	4	6
1997–98	Dallas Stars	NHL	73	39	30	69	30	1	1	0	1	0
1998–99	Dallas Stars	NHL	67	28	27	55	34	23	11	10	21	19
1999–00	Dallas Stars	NHL	48	15	19	34	26	23	7	3	10	18
2000–01	Dallas Stars	NHL	69	29	23	52	30	7	4	0	4	4
2001–02	Dallas Stars	NHL	67	23	24	47	18	—	—	—	—	—
2001–02	New Jersey Devils	NHL	14	2	9	11	4	5	0	1	1	0
2002–03	New Jersey Devils	NHL	80	17	28	45	56	17	3	6	9	4
2003–04	Toronto Maple Leafs	NHL	64	22	28	50	26	9	6	0	6	4
2005–06	Florida Panthers	NHL	65	26	30	56	46	—	—	—	—	—
2006–07	Florida Panthers	NHL	15	5	3	8	4	—	—	—	—	—
NHL totals			1,257	564	562	1,126	677	158	66	50	116	91

=== International ===
Year	Team	Event	Result	GP	G	A	Pts	PIM
1986	Canada	WJC	2nd place, silver medalist(s)	7	5	7	12	6
1990	Canada	WC	4th	1	0	0	0	0
1998	Canada	OG	4th	6	2	3	5	2
2002	Canada	OG	1st place, gold medalist(s)	6	1	1	2	0
Junior totals				7	5	7	12	6
Senior totals				13	3	4	7	2

== Awards and honours ==
Award	Year
College
ECAC Rookie of the Year	1985
All-ECAC Hockey First Team	1986, 1987
AHCA East First-Team All-American	1986, 1987
ECAC Player of the Year	1987
NHL
Calder Memorial Trophy	1988
NHL All-Rookie Team	1988
Stanley Cup champion	1989, 1999, 2003
King Clancy Memorial Trophy	1995
Conn Smythe Trophy	1999

Awards and achievements
Preceded by John Cullen	ECAC Hockey Rookie of the Year; 1984–85	Succeeded by John Messuri
Preceded by Scott Fusco	ECAC Hockey Player of the Year; 1986–87	Succeeded by Pete Lappin
Preceded by Luc Robitaille	Winner of the Calder Memorial Trophy; 1988	Succeeded by Brian Leetch
Preceded by Adam Graves	Winner of the King Clancy Memorial Trophy; 1995	Succeeded by Kris King
Preceded by Steve Yzerman	Winner of the Conn Smythe Trophy; 1999	Succeeded by Scott Stevens
Sporting positions
Preceded by Rotating captains	Calgary Flames captain 1991–95	Succeeded by Theoren Fleury
Preceded by Les Jackson; Brett Hull	General manager of the Dallas Stars; 2009–13	Succeeded by Jim Nill
