= List of Minnesota North Stars/Dallas Stars general managers =

The Dallas Stars are an American professional ice hockey team based in Dallas, Texas. They play in the Central Division of the Western Conference in the National Hockey League (NHL). The team joined the NHL in 1967 as an expansion team as the Minnesota North Stars, but moved to Dallas in 1993. The Stars won their first Stanley Cup championship in 1999. Having first played at the Reunion Arena, the Stars have played their home games at the American Airlines Center since 2001. There have been eleven general managers in franchise history.

== Key ==
Key of terms and definitions
Term	Definition
No.	Number of general managers^{[a]}
Ref(s)	References
–	Does not apply

== General managers ==
General managers of the Dallas Stars franchise
No.	Name	Tenure	Accomplishments during this term	Ref(s)
1	Wren Blair	May 20, 1966 – April 19, 1974	5 playoff appearances	
2	Jack Gordon	April 25, 1974 – February 10, 1978	1 playoff appearance	
3	Lou Nanne	February 10, 1978 – June 14, 1988	1 Stanley Cup Final appearance (1981); 2 division titles and 7 playoff appearances	
4	Jack Ferreira	June 14, 1988 – May 9, 1990	2 playoff appearances	
5	Bob Clarke	June 8, 1990 – June 20, 1992	1 Stanley Cup Final appearance (1991); 1 conference title and 2 playoff appearances	
6	Bob Gainey	June 20, 1992 – January 25, 2002	Won Presidents' Trophy 2 times (1997–98, 1998–99); Won Stanley Cup 1 time in 2 finals appearances (1999, 2000); 2 conference titles, 5 division titles, and 7 playoff appearances	
7	Doug Armstrong	January 25, 2002 – November 13, 2007	2 division titles and 4 playoff appearances	
8	Brett Hull	November 13, 2007 – May 31, 2009	1 playoff appearance	
8	Les Jackson	November 13, 2007 – May 31, 2009	1 playoff appearance	
10	Joe Nieuwendyk	May 31, 2009 – April 28, 2013	No playoff appearances	
11	Jim Nill	April 29, 2013 – present	1 Stanley Cup Final appearance (2020); 1 conference title, 1 division title, and 5 playoff appearances	

== See also ==
- List of NHL general managers

== Notes ==
- ^{a} A running total of the number of general managers of the franchise. Thus any general manager who has two or more separate terms as general manager is only counted once.
