= Battle of the Blades season 3 =

Battle of the Blades
- Season 3
- Celebrity winner: Tessa Bonhomme
- Professional winner: David Pelletier
- No. of episodes: 17

Release
- Original network: CBC
- Original release: September 18 – November 14, 2011

Season chronology
- ← Previous; Season 2 Next → Season 4

The third season of Battle of the Blades premiered on September 18, 2011, as a part of CBC's fall line-up. Like previous seasons, this season showcases a lineup of 8 couples.

Ron MacLean and Kurt Browning return as the show's hosts, with the addition of Virgin Radio 999 DJ Maura Grierson as the "Battle Correspondent", providing viewers a look backstage during the competition. Sandra Bezic continues as the head judge, with Jeremy Roenick as the other regular judge. This season will continue to have one rotating guest judge every week. The show venue for this season is MasterCard Centre in Toronto, Ontario.

Like the previous season, the September 18th-season premiere was actually a preview of the competition, entitled "Battle of the Blades: Game On". It documented the announcement of the cast, training camp and partner assignments of the eight couples, and was dedicated to deceased competitor Wade Belak. The first competition night was broadcast live on Sunday, September 25, 2011. Due to public demand, there was no elimination in week 1, with the first couple eliminated in week 2.

This season introduces "The Judges' Save", which can be used to save a couple from elimination should they be voted off after the Monday night Skate-Off. However, it can only be used once during the entire season and only with the consensus of all judges.

== Casting ==
The official cast announcement was made on the morning of August 22, 2011 on the show's website. It was revealed that the first female hockey player competitor would be cast this season: Olympic Women's Hockey gold medalist Tessa Bonhomme. She is partnered with Olympic Pairs Figure Skating gold medalist David Pelletier. The announcement also revealed six of the seven remaining male NHL hockey players and the all skating professionals. The seven female professionals this season include previous participants Marie-France Dubreuil (season 1 second runner-up), Anabelle Langlois (season 2), Violetta Afanasieva (season 2), and first-timers Elena Berezhnaya, Tanith Belbin, Kim Navarro, and Marcy Hinzmann-Harris. The partnering of competitors beyond Bonhomme & Pelletier were not announced at the time.

On August 30, 2011, former Calgary Flames team captain Todd Simpson confirmed on his Twitter page that he is the eighth hockey player participant of the season.

On August 31, 2011, competitor Wade Belak died less than one month before the scheduled premiere. CBC stated that Belak's death would not affect the show's premiere but did not announce at that time if Belak's spot would be replaced by another hockey player. CBC announced the season would open with a dedication to Belak, with footage of his final days training for the competition shown during the preview show, "Game On".

At the end of the programme "Game On", it was announced that Kim Navarro, originally Wade Belak's partner, would now be skating with former participant Russ Courtnall. Courtnall participated in season 2 with Christine Hough-Sweeney and was the first couple eliminated. Courtnall and Navarro are competing for Belak's original charity of choice, Tourette Syndrome and Neurodevelopmental Clinic at the Toronto Western Hospital. Courtnall is the first hockey player participant to compete in more than one season.

== Couples ==
| Hockey player | Team(s) played | Professional partner | Charity playing for | Status |
|---|---|---|---|---|
| Todd Simpson | Calgary Flames; Florida Panthers; Phoenix Coyotes; Mighty Ducks of Anaheim; Ottawa Senators; Chicago Blackhawks; Montreal Canadiens | Marcy Hinzmann-Harris | YMCA's Y Strong Kids Campaign (Simpson); Canadian Breast Cancer Foundation (Hinzmann-Harris) | Eliminated 1st on October 3, 2011 |
| Russ Courtnall | Toronto Maple Leafs; Montreal Canadiens; Minnesota North Stars; Dallas Stars; Vancouver Canucks; New York Rangers; Los Angeles Kings | Kim Navarro | Tourette Syndrome and Neurodevelopmental Clinic at the Toronto Western Hospital | Eliminated 2nd on October 10, 2011 |
| Brad May | Buffalo Sabres; Vancouver Canucks; Phoenix Coyotes; Colorado Avalanche; Anaheim Ducks; Toronto Maple Leafs; Detroit Red Wings | Anabelle Langlois | Autism Speaks | Eliminated 3rd on October 24, 2011 |
| Cale Hulse | New Jersey Devils; Calgary Flames; Nashville Predators; Phoenix Coyotes; Columbus Blue Jackets | Violetta Afanasieva | Canadian Cancer Society | Eliminated 4th on October 31, 2011 |
| Curtis Leschyshyn | Quebec Nordiques; Colorado Avalanche; Washington Capitals; Hartford Whalers; Carolina Hurricanes; Minnesota Wild; Ottawa Senators | Elena Berezhnaya | Children's Hospital Foundation of Saskatchewan | Eliminated 5th on November 7, 2011 |
| Boyd Devereaux | Phoenix Coyotes; Edmonton Oilers; Detroit Red Wings; Toronto Maple Leafs | Tanith Belbin | Epilepsy Ontario, Huron-Perth-Bruce (Devereaux); Montreal Neurological Institute (Belbin) | Third Place on November 14, 2011 |
| Bryan Berard | Columbus Blue Jackets; Chicago Blackhawks; Boston Bruins; New York Rangers; Toronto Maple Leafs; New York Islanders | Marie-France Dubreuil | Do it for Daron (DIFD) with the Royal Ottawa Foundation for Mental Health | Second Place on November 14, 2011 |
| Tessa Bonhomme | Toronto Furies; Mississauga Chiefs; Ohio State Buckeyes | David Pelletier | Run for the Cure (Bonhomme); Ronald McDonald House Charities Canada (Pelletier) | Winners on November 14, 2011 |

== Scoring Chart ==
Red numbers indicate the couples with the lowest score for each week.
Green numbers indicate the couples with the highest score for each week.
indicates the couple eliminated that week.
indicates the returning couple(s) that finished in the bottom two/three.
indicates the returning couple that was saved by the judges using "The Judges' Save" after being eliminated in the Skate-Off the same night.
indicates the winning couple.
indicates the runner-up couple.
indicates the third-place couple.

| Team | Place | 1 | 2 | 1+2 | 3 | 4 | 5 | 6 | 7 | 8^{[a]} |
|---|---|---|---|---|---|---|---|---|---|---|
| Tessa & David | 1 | 17.0 | 16.6 | 33.6 | 16.4 | 17.1 | 17.1 | 17.5 | 17.6 | ✔ |
| Bryan & Marie-France | 2 | 16.5 | 16.6 | 33.1 | 16.7 | 16.9 | 17.5 | 17.4 | 18.0 | ✔ |
| Boyd & Tanith | 3 | 16.2 | 17.1 | 33.3 | 16.5 | 17.0 | 17.3 | 17.8 | 17.7 | ✔ |
| Curtis & Elena | 4 | 16.4 | 16.5 | 32.9 | 16.3 | 17.1 | 17.2 | 16.9 | 17.4 | |
| Cale & Violetta | 5 | 16.6 | 16.4 | 33.0 | 16.6 | 17.2 | 16.8 | 17.6 | | |
| Brad & Anabelle | 6 | 16.2 | 16.9 | 33.1 | 16.7 | 16.9 | 16.8 | | | |
| Russ & Kim | 7 | 16.7 | 16.5 | 33.2 | 16.7 | | | | | |
| Todd & Marcy | 8 | 16.5 | 16.6 | 33.1 | | | | | | |

=== Skate-Off Chart ===
| Week | Bottom Two Couples (Weeks 5, 7: Bottom Three) | Music | Judges' Vote to Eliminate | Eliminated Couple | "The Judges' Save" Used |
|---|---|---|---|---|---|
| 2 | Cale & Violetta | "Love to Love" – Jill Scott | 0 (NIL) | Todd & Marcy | No |
| 2 | Todd & Marcy | "Apologize" – OneRepublic | 3 (Theo, Sandra, Jeremy) | Todd & Marcy | No |
| 3 | Russ & Kim | "Dancing Fool" – Barry Manilow | 2 (Sandra, Shae-Lynn) | Russ & Kim | No |
| 3 | Boyd & Tanith | "She Wants to Move" – N.E.R.D (featuring Alesha Dixon) | 1 (Mark) | Russ & Kim | No |
| 4 | Cale & Violetta | "She's So High" – Tal Bachman | 0 (NIL) | Brad & Anabelle ( Saved using Judges' Save ) | YES |
| 4 | Brad & Anabelle | "Come Fly with Me" – Michael Bublé | 3 (Bryan, Sandra, Brian) | Brad & Anabelle ( Saved using Judges' Save ) | YES |
| 5^{[b]} | Curtis & Elena | "Give Me Everything" – Pitbull (featuring Ne-Yo, Afrojack and Nayer) | 0 (NIL) | Brad & Anabelle | Not Applicable |
| 5^{[b]} | Brad & Anabelle | "Electric" – Shawn Desman | 3 (Chris, Sandra, Jeremy) | Brad & Anabelle | Not Applicable |
| 5^{[b]} | Cale & Violetta | "Suddenly I See" – KT Tunstall | 0 (NIL) | Brad & Anabelle | Not Applicable |
| 6 | Cale & Violetta | "Love Potion No. 9" – The Clovers | 3 (Katarina, Sandra, Jeremy) | Cale & Violetta | Not Applicable |
| 6 | Boyd & Tanith | "Tore My Heart" – OONA | 0 (NIL) | Cale & Violetta | Not Applicable |
| 7^{[c]} | Curtis & Elena | "Don't Let the Sun Go Down on Me" – Casey Desmond, Jeff Jenkins | 3 (Christopher, Sandra, Jeremy) | Curtis & Elena | Not Applicable |
| 7^{[c]} | Bryan & Marie-France | "If I Can't Have You" – Etta James, Harvey Fuqua | 0 (NIL) | Curtis & Elena | Not Applicable |
| 7^{[c]} | Tessa & David | "It's Only Love" – Bryan Adams, Tina Turner | 0 (NIL) | Curtis & Elena | Not Applicable |

Notes

- a Skates in Week 8 were not scored by the judges.
- b Week 5 resulted in a Three-Way Skate-Off due to 0.03% separating 4th and 5th place after the combination of judges' score and viewer's voting. The organizers decided that because of the close margin, the 4th place couple would also participate in the Skate-Off. However, the exact placements of the Bottom 3 couples were not revealed.
- c Week 7 resulted in a Three-Way Skate-Off due to 0.002% separating 2nd and 3rd place after the combination of judges' score and viewer's voting. The organizers decided that because of the close margin, the 2nd place couple would also participate in the Skate-Off. However, the exact placements of the Bottom 3 couples were not revealed.

== Average chart ==
| Rank by average | Place | Couple | Total | Number of skates | Average |
|---|---|---|---|---|---|
| 1 | 2 | Bryan & Marie-France | 119.6 | 7 | 17.09 |
| 1 | 3 | Boyd & Tanith | 119.6 | 7 | 17.09 |
| 3 | 1 | Tessa & David | 119.3 | 7 | 17.04 |
| 4 | 5 | Cale & Violetta | 101.2 | 6 | 16.87 |
| 5 | 4 | Curtis & Elena | 117.8 | 7 | 16.83 |
| 6 | 6 | Brad & Anabelle | 83.5 | 5 | 16.70 |
| 7 | 7 | Russ & Kim | 49.9 | 3 | 16.63 |
| 8 | 8 | Todd & Marcy | 33.1 | 2 | 16.55 |

== Weekly themes and guest judges ==
| Week | Theme | Guest Judge(s) |
|---|---|---|
| 1 | Rock N' Roll | Darcy Tucker |
| 2 | Passion | Theoren Fleury |
| 3 | The Beat | Mark Napier; Paul Martini (substituting for Jeremy Roenick on Sunday); Shae-Lynn Bourne (substituting for Jeremy Roenick on Monday) |
| 4 | The Great Canadian Songbook | Bryan Trottier; Brian Orser (substituting for Jeremy Roenick) |
| 5 | Fans' Music Choice | Chris Nilan |
| 6 | Hallowe'en | Katarina Witt |
| 7 | Duets | Christopher Dean |
| 8 | Skaters' Choice & Reprise Skate | Don Cherry (Sunday only) |

== Individual scores & songs ==
=== Week 1 ===
Individual judges scores in charts below (given in parentheses) are listed in this order from left to right:
Darcy Tucker, Sandra Bezic, Jeremy Roenick.

Running order

| Couple | Score | Music |
|---|---|---|
| Brad & Anabelle | 16.2 (5.4, 5.4, 5.4) | "Saturday Night's Alright for Fighting" – Nickelback |
| Cale & Violetta | 16.6 (5.5, 5.6, 5.5) | "E.T." – Katy Perry |
| Boyd & Tanith | 16.2 (5.6, 5.3, 5.3) | "Innocent" – Our Lady Peace |
| Bryan & Marie-France | 16.5 (5.5, 5.5, 5.5) | "Rocketeer" – Far East Movement (featuring Ryan Tedder) |
| Russ & Kim | 16.7 (5.6, 5.6, 5.5) | "Hero" – Chad Kroeger (featuring Josey Scott) |
| Curtis & Elena | 16.4 (5.5, 5.4, 5.5) | "Animal" – Neon Trees |
| Todd & Marcy | 16.5 (5.5, 5.5, 5.5) | "Fire" – Raghav |
| Tessa & David | 17.0 (5.7, 5.7, 5.6) | "Hit Me with Your Best Shot" – Pat Benatar |

=== Week 2 ===
Individual judges scores in charts below (given in parentheses) are listed in this order from left to right:
Theoren Fleury, Sandra Bezic, Jeremy Roenick.

Running order

| Couple | Score | Music |
|---|---|---|
| Cale & Violetta | 16.4 (5.5, 5.4, 5.5) | "Love to Love" – Jill Scott |
| Todd & Marcy | 16.6 (5.4, 5.6, 5.6) | "Apologize" – OneRepublic |
| Russ & Kim | 16.5 (5.6, 5.4, 5.5) | "Buttons" – Pussycat Dolls |
| Curtis & Elena | 16.5 (5.5, 5.5, 5.5) | "The Crow and the Butterfly" – Shinedown |
| Tessa & David | 16.6 (5.6, 5.3, 5.7) | "Cold as Ice" – Foreigner |
| Bryan & Marie-France | 16.6 (5.5, 5.5, 5.6) | "Lost Together" – Blue Rodeo |
| Boyd & Tanith | 17.1 (5.7, 5.7, 5.7) | "Jar of Hearts" – Christina Perri |
| Brad & Anabelle | 16.9 (5.6, 5.6, 5.7) | "I am a Natural Born Lover" – David Wilcox |

=== Week 3 ===
Individual judges scores in charts below (given in parentheses) are listed in this order from left to right:
Mark Napier, Sandra Bezic, Paul Martini.

Running order

| Couple | Score | Music |
|---|---|---|
| Boyd & Tanith | 16.5 (5.6, 5.5, 5.4) | "She Wants to Move" – N.E.R.D (featuring Alesha Dixon) |
| Brad & Anabelle | 16.7 (5.6, 5.6, 5.5) | "I Don't Feel Like Dancin'" – Scissor Sisters |
| Bryan & Marie-France | 16.7 (5.5, 5.7, 5.5) | "Elevatas" – Robin Thicke |
| Tessa & David | 16.4 (5.5, 5.4, 5.5) | "Return of the Mack" – Mark Morrison |
| Cale & Violetta | 16.6 (5.6, 5.6, 5.4) | "Mr. Saxobeat" – Alexandra Stan |
| Curtis & Elena | 16.3 (5.5, 5.4, 5.4) | "Hello" – Martin Solveig & Dragonette |
| Russ & Kim | 16.7 (5.6, 5.6, 5.5) | "Dancing Fool" – Barry Manilow |

=== Week 4 ===
Individual judges scores in charts below (given in parentheses) are listed in this order from left to right:
Bryan Trottier, Sandra Bezic, Brian Orser.

Running order

| Couple | Score | Music |
|---|---|---|
| Bryan & Marie-France | 16.9 (5.6, 5.8, 5.5) | "Sk8er Boi" – Avril Lavigne |
| Cale & Violetta | 17.2 (5.6, 5.8, 5.8) | "She's So High" – Tal Bachman |
| Tessa & David | 17.1 (5.7, 5.7, 5.7) | "Long Time Running" – The Tragically Hip |
| Curtis & Elena | 17.1 (5.7, 5.7, 5.7) | "Let's Go Higher" – Johnny Reid |
| Brad & Anabelle | 16.9 (5.7, 5.6, 5.6) | "Come Fly with Me" – Michael Bublé |
| Boyd & Tanith | 17.0 (5.7, 5.7, 5.6) | "Black Velvet" – Alannah Myles |

=== Week 5 ===
Individual judges scores in charts below (given in parentheses) are listed in this order from left to right:
Chris Nilan, Sandra Bezic, Jeremy Roenick.

Running order

| Couple | Score | Music |
|---|---|---|
| Brad & Anabelle | 16.8 (5.6, 5.6, 5.6) | "Electric" – Shawn Desman |
| Tessa & David | 17.1 (5.7, 5.7, 5.7) | "Breakaway" – Kelly Clarkson |
| Boyd & Tanith | 17.3 (5.8, 5.7, 5.8) | "Fever" – Michael Bublé |
| Cale & Violetta | 16.8 (5.6, 5.6, 5.6) | "Suddenly I See" – KT Tunstall |
| Curtis & Elena | 17.2 (5.7, 5.8, 5.7) | "Give Me Everything" – Pitbull (featuring Ne-Yo, Afrojack and Nayer) |
| Bryan & Marie-France | 17.5 (5.7, 5.9, 5.9) | "Can't Help Falling in Love" – Elvis Presley |

=== Week 6 ===
Individual judges scores in charts below (given in parentheses) are listed in this order from left to right:
Katarina Witt, Sandra Bezic, Jeremy Roenick.

Running order

| Couple | Score | Music |
|---|---|---|
| Curtis & Elena | 16.9 (5.6, 5.6, 5.7) | "Ladies and Gentlemen" – Saliva |
| Bryan & Marie-France | 17.4 (5.8, 5.8, 5.8) | "Tainted Love" – Marilyn Manson |
| Boyd & Tanith | 17.8 (6.0, 5.9, 5.9) | "Tore My Heart" – OONA |
| Cale & Violetta | 17.6 (5.8, 5.9, 5.9) | "Love Potion No. 9" – The Clovers |
| Tessa & David | 17.5 (5.9, 5.8, 5.8) | "Haunted House" – Elvira |

=== Week 7 ===
Individual judges scores in charts below (given in parentheses) are listed in this order from left to right:
Christopher Dean, Sandra Bezic, Jeremy Roenick.

Running order

| Couple | Score | Music |
|---|---|---|
| Tessa & David | 17.6 (5.8, 5.9, 5.9) | "It's Only Love" – Bryan Adams, Tina Turner |
| Curtis & Elena | 17.4 (5.8, 5.8, 5.8) | "Don't Let the Sun Go Down on Me" – Casey Desmond, Jeff Jenkins |
| Boyd & Tanith | 17.7 (5.9, 5.9, 5.9) | "Falling Slowly" – Glen Hansard, Markéta Irglová |
| Bryan & Marie-France | 18.0 (6.0, 6.0, 6.0) | "If I Can't Have You" – Etta James, Harvey Fuqua |

=== Week 8 ===
None of the skates in Week 8 were scored.

Running order

| Couple | Score | Music |
|---|---|---|
| Tessa & David | Not scored | "I Wanna Dance With Somebody" – These Kids Wear Crowns |
| Tessa & David | Not scored | "Long Time Running" – The Tragically Hip |
| Bryan & Marie-France | Not scored | "Wish You Were Here" – Avril Lavigne |
| Bryan & Marie-France | Not scored | "Sk8er Boi" – Avril Lavigne |
| Boyd & Tanith | Not scored | "Seven Day Fool" – Jully Black |
| Boyd & Tanith | Not scored | "Jar of Hearts" – Christina Perri |

== Weekly ratings ==
Weekly ratings and rankings are measured by BBM Canada, an audience measurement organization for Canadian television and radio broadcasting. Weekly ranks are based on weeks starting on Monday and ending on Sunday.

| Episode Number | Episode | Viewers (in millions) | Timeslot Rank | Nightly Rank | Weekly Rank | Reference |
|---|---|---|---|---|---|---|
| 300 | Game On (Airdate: September 18, 2011) | 1.195 | #2 | #2 | #13 | |
| 301 | Week 1: Performance (Part I) (Airdate: September 25, 2011) | 1.307 | #2 | #4 | #27 | |
| 302 | Week 1: Performance (Part II) (Airdate: September 26, 2011) | 0.822 | #4 | #9 | #45 | |
| 303 | Week 2: Performance (Airdate: October 2, 2011) | 1.058 | #3 | #5 | #33 | |
| 304 | Week 2: Results (Airdate: October 3, 2011) | 0.786 | #4 | #8 | #40 | |
| 305 | Week 3: Performance (Airdate: October 9, 2011) | 1.176 | #2 | #4 | #34 | |
| 306 | Week 3: Results (Airdate: October 10, 2011) | 0.873 | #4 | #10 | #39 | |
| 307 | Week 4: Performance (Airdate: October 16, 2011) | 1.277 | #2 | #4 | #24 | |
| 308 | Week 4: Results (Airdate: October 17, 2011) | 0.686 | #4 | #11 | #44 | |
| 309 | Week 5: Performance (Airdate: October 23, 2011) | 1.098 | #2 | #5 | #31 | |
| 310 | Week 5: Results (Airdate: October 24, 2011) | 0.679 | #3 | #9 | #48 | |
| 311 | Week 6: Performance (Airdate: October 30, 2011) | 1.175 | #3 | #6 | #29 | |
| 312 | Week 6: Results (Airdate: October 31, 2011) | 1.009 | #2 | #7 | #39 | |
| 313 | Week 7: Performance (Airdate: November 6, 2011) | 1.066 | #3 | #6 | #36 | |
| 314 | Week 7: Results (Airdate: November 7, 2011) | 0.832 | #4 | #10 | #48 | |
| 315 | Week 8: Performance (Airdate: November 13, 2011) | 1.341 | #2 | #5 | #27 | |
| 316 | Week 8: Results – Season Finale (Airdate: November 14, 2011) | 0.897 | #4 | #11 | #44 | |
