= Battle of the Blades season 2 =

Battle of the Blades
- Season 2
- Celebrity winner: Valeri Bure
- Professional winner: Ekaterina Gordeeva
- No. of episodes: 17

Release
- Original network: CBC
- Original release: September 26 – November 22, 2010

Season chronology
- ← Previous; Season 1 Next → Season 3

The second season of Battle of the Blades premiered on September 26, 2010, as a part of CBC's fall line-up. Like season 1, this season showcased a lineup of eight couples.

Ron MacLean and Kurt Browning return as the show's hosts. Sandra Bezic continued as the head judge this season, with the addition of former NHL player Jeremy Roenick as the other regular judge, replacing season 1's Dick Button. This season continued to have one rotating guest judge every week. Because Maple Leaf Gardens was undergoing renovations at the time, the venue this season was set in a sound stage at Pinewood Toronto Studios. The sound stage was transformed into a skating rink, with two-tiered seating.

The elimination format changed this season. The scores from the couples' Sunday night performance were now added to the viewers voting to determine the bottom two couples. On Monday, the bottom two couples are revealed and they skate their Sunday night program once more in the Skate-Off. Instead of scoring the couples on their Skate-Off performance, this season the judges were just asked to vote on the couple of their choice. The couple with the fewest judges' votes was then eliminated. However, it was announced that the judges would not be scoring the couples' week eight skates and that the top three placements were decided solely on viewers voting.

The official cast announcement was made on the morning of September 7, 2010 on the show's official website.

The season premiere on September 26, 2010, was actually a preview of the competition, entitled "Battle of the Blades: Game On". It documented the announcement of the cast, training camp and partner assignments of the eight couples. The first actual competition night was broadcast live on Sunday, October 3, 2010.

On October 25, 2010, it was announced that there would be a special show on October 31, 2010, entitled "Second Chance Sunday" in which the four previously eliminated pairs would gain a second chance to go back to the competition.

== Couples ==
NHL Player	Team(s) Played	Professional partner	Charity playing for	Status
Russ Courtnall	Toronto Maple Leafs; Montreal Canadiens; Minnesota North Stars; Dallas Stars; Vancouver Canucks; New York Rangers; Los Angeles Kings	Christine Hough-Sweeney	The Archie Courtnall Center - Victoria Hospital Foundation	Eliminated 1st on October 4, 2010
Georges Laraque	Edmonton Oilers; Phoenix Coyotes; Pittsburgh Penguins; Montreal Canadiens	Anabelle Langlois	Hockey for Haiti	Eliminated 2nd on October 11, 2010
P. J. Stock	New York Rangers; Montreal Canadiens; Philadelphia Flyers; Boston Bruins	Violetta Afanasieva	ONEXONE	Eliminated 3rd on October 18, 2010
Theo Fleury	Calgary Flames; Colorado Avalanche; New York Rangers; Chicago Blackhawks	Jamie Salé	The Men's Project	Eliminated 5th on November 8, 2010
Kelly Chase	St. Louis Blues; Hartford Whalers; Toronto Maple Leafs	Kyoko Ina	Children's Hospital Foundation of Saskatchewan	Eliminated 6th on November 16, 2010
Todd Warriner	Toronto Maple Leafs; Tampa Bay Lightning; Phoenix Coyotes; Vancouver Canucks; Philadelphia Flyers; Nashville Predators	Isabelle Brasseur	Heart and Stroke Foundation of Canada	Third Place on November 22, 2010
Patrice Brisebois	Colorado Avalanche; Montreal Canadiens	Shae-Lynn Bourne	Sainte-Justine UHC Foundation, Make-A-Wish Foundation Canada	Eliminated 4th on October 25, 2010; Reinstated on November 1, 2010; Second Place on November 22, 2010
Valeri Bure	Montreal Canadiens; Calgary Flames; Florida Panthers; St. Louis Blues; Florida Panthers; Dallas Stars	Ekaterina Gordeeva	Compassion Canada, Cardiac Kids	Winners on November 22, 2010

== Scoring Chart ==
Red numbers indicate the couples with the lowest score for each week.
Green numbers indicate the couples with the highest score for each week.
indicates the couple (or couples) eliminated that week.
indicates the returning couple that finished in the bottom two.
indicates the eliminated couple that finished in the top two couples in the Second Chance competition.
indicates the Top 4 couples not needing to compete in the Second Chance competition.
indicates the winning couple.
indicates the runner-up couple.
indicates the third-place couple.

Team	Place	1	2	3	4	5	6	7	8^{[a]}
Valeri & Ekaterina	1	17.3	17.6	17.4	17.7	✔	17.8	16.9	✔
Patrice & Shae-Lynn	2	16.6	17.3	17.7	17.2	17.8	17.7	17.1	✔
Todd & Isabelle	3	16.8	17.4	17.3	17.5	✔	17.3	17.7	✔
Kelly & Kyoko	4	17.2	17.0	17.0	16.8	✔	17.2	17.3	
Theo & Jamie	5	17.1	17.0	17.2	17.3	✔	17.1		
P.J. & Violetta	6	17.2	17.6	16.9		17.3			
Georges & Anabelle	7	17.0	17.0			17.0			
Russ & Christine	8	16.8				17.2			

Notes

- a Skates in Week 8 were not scored by the judges.

=== Skate-Off Chart ===
Week	Bottom Two Couples (Top Two Couples – Week 5)	Music	Judges' Vote to Save	Eliminated/Reinstated Couple
1	Russ & Christine	"Hero" – Chad Kroeger featuring Josey Scott	0 (NIL)	Russ & Christine; Eliminated
1	Valeri & Ekaterina	"Paralyzer" – Finger Eleven	3 (Brett, Sandra, Jeremy)	Russ & Christine; Eliminated
2	Todd & Isabelle	"Every Rose Has Its Thorn" – Poison	2 (Marie-France, Sandra)	Georges & Annabelle; Eliminated
2	Georges & Annabelle	"Kiss from a Rose" – Seal	1 (Jeremy)	Georges & Annabelle; Eliminated
3	P.J. & Violetta	"Canned Heat" – Jamiroquai	0 (NIL)	P.J. & Violetta; Eliminated
3	Valeri & Ekaterina	"The Anthem" – Pitbull	3 (Ken, Sandra, Jeremy)	P.J. & Violetta; Eliminated
4	Patrice & Shae-Lynn	"All Over Again" – Shae-Lynn Bourne & Don Mescall	0 (NIL)	Patrice & Shae-Lynn; Eliminated
4	Kelly & Kyoko	"Bad Things" – Jace Everett	3 (Scott, Sandra, Jeremy)	Patrice & Shae-Lynn; Eliminated
5	P.J. & Violetta	"House of the Rising Sun" – The Animals	1 (Curtis)	Patrice & Shae-Lynn; Reinstated
5	Patrice & Shae-Lynn	"Monster Mash" – Bobby "Boris" Pickett	2 (Sandra, Jeremy)	Patrice & Shae-Lynn; Reinstated
6	Todd & Isabelle	"Brick House" – Commodores from To Wong Foo, Thanks for Everything! Julie Newmar	3 (Toller, Sandra, Jeremy)	Theo & Jamie; Eliminated
6	Jamie & Theo	"Stayin' Alive" – Bee Gees from Saturday Night Fever	0 (NIL)	Theo & Jamie; Eliminated
7	Kelly & Kyoko	"I Love Your Smile" – Charlie Winston	1 (Don)	Kelly & Kyoko; Eliminated
7	Valeri & Ekaterina	"You're My Best Friend" – Queen	2 (Sandra, Jeremy)	Kelly & Kyoko; Eliminated

== Average chart ==
Rank by average	Place	Couple	Total	Number of skates	Average
1	1	Valeri & Ekaterina	104.7	6	17.45
2	2	Patrice & Shae-Lynn	121.4	7	17.34
3	3	Todd & Isabelle	104.0	6	17.33
4	6	P.J. & Violetta	69.0	4	17.25
5	5	Theo & Jamie	85.7	5	17.14
6	4	Kelly & Kyoko	102.5	6	17.08
7	7	Georges & Anabelle	51.0	3	17.00
7	8	Russ & Christine	34.0	2	17.00

== Weekly themes and guest judges ==
Week	Theme	Guest Judge
1	Rock Music	Brett Hull
2	Bringing Sexy Back	Marie-France Dubreuil
3	Dance	Ken Daneyko
4	Country	Scott Hamilton
5	Horror/Hallowe'en ( Second Chance Competition )	Curtis Joseph
6	Stage & Screen	Toller Cranston
7	It's a Man's World	Don Cherry
8	Skater's Choice & Favourite Skate	Christopher Dean

== Individual scores & songs ==
=== Week 1 ===
Individual judges scores in charts below (given in parentheses) are listed in this order from left to right:
Brett Hull, Sandra Bezic, Jeremy Roenick.

Running order

Couple	Score	Music
Patrice & Shae-Lynn	16.6 (5.5, 5.6, 5.5)	"Song 2" – Blur
Kelly & Kyoko	17.2 (5.7, 5.7, 5.8)	"Here I Go Again" – Whitesnake
P.J. & Violetta	17.2 (5.7, 5.8, 5.7)	"How You Like Me Now?" – The Heavy
Russ & Christine	16.8 (5.6, 5.6, 5.6)	"Hero" – Chad Kroeger featuring Josey Scott
Georges & Anabelle	17.0 (5.6, 5.7, 5.7)	"Eye of the Tiger" – Survivor
Todd & Isabelle	16.8 (5.7, 5.6, 5.5)	"Paint It, Black" – The Rolling Stones
Valeri & Ekaterina	17.3 (5.8, 5.8, 5.7)	"Paralyzer" – Finger Eleven
Theo & Jamie	17.1 (5.7, 5.6, 5.8)	"Let It Rock" – Kevin Rudolf featuring Lil Wayne

=== Week 2 ===
Individual judges scores in charts below (given in parentheses) are listed in this order from left to right:
Marie-France Dubreuil, Sandra Bezic, Jeremy Roenick.

Running order

Couple	Score	Music
Theo & Jamie	17.0 (5.6, 5.7, 5.7)	"Perfect" – Hedley
Todd & Isabelle	17.4 (5.8, 5.8, 5.8)	"Every Rose Has Its Thorn" – Poison
Kelly & Kyoko	17.0 (5.7, 5.6, 5.7)	"Still Got the Blues (For You)" – Gary Moore
Patrice & Shae-Lynn	17.3 (5.7, 5.8, 5.8)	"When I Get You Alone" – Robin Thicke
Valeri & Ekaterina	17.6 (5.9, 5.9, 5.8)	"The Look of Love" – Shelby Lynne
Georges & Annabelle	17.0 (5.6, 5.6, 5.8)	"Kiss from a Rose" – Seal
P.J. & Violetta	17.6 (5.9, 5.9, 5.8)	"Sexy Love" – Ne-Yo

=== Week 3 ===
Individual judges scores in charts below (given in parentheses) are listed in this order from left to right:
Ken Daneyko, Sandra Bezic, Jeremy Roenick.

Running order

Couple	Score	Music
Valeri & Ekaterina	17.4 (5.8, 5.8, 5.8)	"The Anthem" – Pitbull
P.J. & Violetta	16.9 (5.7, 5.5, 5.7)	"Canned Heat" – Jamiroquai
Todd & Isabelle	17.3 (5.8, 5.7, 5.8)	"Pon de Replay" – Rihanna
Theo & Jamie	17.2 (5.8, 5.7, 5.7)	"Superfreak" – Rick James
Patrice & Shae-Lynn	17.7 (5.9, 5.9, 5.9)	"L-O-V-E" – Michael Bublé
Kelly & Kyoko	17.0 (5.7, 5.6, 5.7)	"Hot n Cold" – Katy Perry

=== Week 4 ===
Individual judges scores in charts below (given in parentheses) are listed in this order from left to right:
Scott Hamilton, Sandra Bezic, Jeremy Roenick.

Running order

Couple	Score	Music
Kelly & Kyoko	16.8 (5.6, 5.6, 5.6)	"Bad Things" – Jace Everett
Patrice & Shae-Lynn	17.2 (5.8, 5.7, 5.7)	"All Over Again" – Shae-Lynn Bourne & Don Mescall
Theo & Jamie	17.3 (5.7, 5.8, 5.8)	"As The Story Goes" – Theoren Fleury
Valeri & Ekaterina	17.7 (5.9, 5.9, 5.9)	"Need You Now" – Lady Antebellum
Todd & Isabelle	17.5 (5.8, 5.9, 5.8)	"Lookin' out My Back Door" – Creedence Clearwater Revival

=== Week 5 ===
Individual judges scores in charts below (given in parentheses) are listed in this order from left to right:
Curtis Joseph, Sandra Bezic, Jeremy Roenick.

Running order

Couple	Score	Music
Russ & Christine	17.2 (5.7, 5.7, 5.8)	"I Put a Spell on You" – Creedence Clearwater Revival
Georges & Annabelle	17.0 (5.6, 5.7, 5.7)	"O Fortuna" – Carl Orff
P.J. & Violetta	17.3 (5.7, 5.8, 5.8)	"House of the Rising Sun" – The Animals
Patrice & Shae-Lynn	17.8 (5.8, 6.0, 6.0^{[a]})	"Monster Mash" – Bobby "Boris" Pickett

Notes

- a Jeremy Roenick had originally given Patrice & Shae-Lynn a score of 5.9, but opted to change it to a perfect 6.0 upon hearing Sandra Bezic had given them the perfect score. CBC did not have time to change the score initially and the on-screen graphic still displayed Roenick's given score at 5.9, giving the couple a total of 17.7. When the judges' leaderboard was announced at the end of the night, the graphic was corrected to reflect the new score.

=== Week 6 ===
Individual judges scores in charts below (given in parentheses) are listed in this order from left to right:
Toller Cranston, Sandra Bezic, Jeremy Roenick.

Running order

Couple	Score	Music
Theo & Jamie	17.1 (5.7, 5.7, 5.7)	"Stayin' Alive" – Bee Gees from Saturday Night Fever
Kelly & Kyoko	17.2 (5.6, 5.8, 5.8)	"All Star" – Smash Mouth from Shrek
Patrice & Shae-Lynn	17.7 (5.9, 5.9, 5.9)	"Jai Ho" – A.R. Rahman (featuring Sukhwinder Singh, Tanvi Shah, Mahalaxmi Iyer & Vijay Prakash) from Slumdog Millionaire
Valeri & Ekaterina	17.8 (5.8, 6.0, 6.0)	"From Russia with Love" – Prague Philharmonic Orchestra from From Russia with Love
Todd & Isabelle	17.3 (5.5, 5.9, 5.9)	"Brick House" – Commodores from To Wong Foo, Thanks for Everything! Julie Newmar

=== Week 7 ===
Individual judges scores in charts below (given in parentheses) are listed in this order from left to right:
Don Cherry, Sandra Bezic, Jeremy Roenick.

Running order

Couple	Score	Music
Todd & Isabelle	17.7 (5.9, 5.9, 5.9)	"Dynamite" – Taio Cruz
Patrice & Shae-Lynn	17.1 (5.8, 5.6, 5.7)	"Boogie Shoes" – KC and the Sunshine Band
Kelly & Kyoko	17.3 (5.8, 5.7, 5.8)	"I Love Your Smile" – Charlie Winston
Valeri & Ekaterina	16.9 (5.7, 5.6, 5.6)	"You're My Best Friend" – Queen

=== Week 8 ===
None of the skates in week 8 were scored.

Running order

Couple	Score	Music
Valeri & Ekaterina	Not scored	"Stereo Love" – Edward Maya featuring Vika Jigulina
Valeri & Ekaterina	Not scored	"From Russia with Love" – Prague Philharmonic Orchestra from From Russia with Love
Todd & Isabelle	Not scored	"Black Betty" – Ram Jam
Todd & Isabelle	Not scored	"Dynamite" – Taio Cruz
Patrice & Shae-Lynn	Not scored	"Let's Get It Started" – The Black Eyed Peas
Patrice & Shae-Lynn	Not scored	"L-O-V-E" – Michael Bublé

== Weekly ratings ==
Weekly ratings and rankings are measured by BBM Canada, an audience measurement organization for Canadian television and radio broadcasting.

Episode Number	Episode	Viewers (in millions)	Weekly Rank	Reference
200	Game On (Airdate: September 26, 2010)	1.511	#23	
201	Week 1: Performance (Airdate: October 3, 2010)	1.662	#20	
202	Week 1: Results (Airdate: October 4, 2010)	1.09	N/A	
203	Week 2: Performance (Airdate: October 10, 2010)	1.498	#24	
204	Week 2: Results (Airdate: October 11, 2010)	0.969	N/A	
205	Week 3: Performance (Airdate: October 17, 2010)	1.414	#24	
206	Week 3: Results (Airdate: October 18, 2010)	1.01	N/A	
207	Week 4: Performance (Airdate: October 24, 2010)	1.429	#23	
208	Week 4: Results (Airdate: October 25, 2010)	1.079	N/A	
209	Week 5: Performance (Airdate: October 31, 2010)	1.375	#22	
210	Week 5: Results (Airdate: November 1, 2010)	1.10	N/A	
211	Week 6: Performance (Airdate: November 7, 2010)	1.619	#18	
212	Week 6: Results (Airdate: November 8, 2010)	1.122	N/A	
213	Week 7: Performance (Airdate: November 14, 2010)	1.769	#15	
214	Week 7: Results (Airdate: November 15, 2010)	1.20	N/A	
215	Week 8: Performance (Airdate: November 21, 2010)	1.505	#26	
216	Week 8: Results – Season Finale (Airdate: November 22, 2010)	1.333	#24	
