= Kent Simpson =

Kent Simpson may refer to:

- Kent Simpson (ice hockey, born 1975), Canadian ice hockey left winger
- Kent Simpson (ice hockey, born 1992), Canadian ice hockey goaltender
