= Battle of the Blades season 5 =

Battle of the Blades
- Season 5
- Celebrity winner: Sheldon Kennedy
- Professional winner: Kaitlyn Weaver
- No. of episodes: 7

Release
- Original network: CBC Television
- Original release: September 19 – October 31, 2019

Season chronology
- ← Previous; Season 4 Next → Season 6

The fifth season of Battle of the Blades premiered on September 19, 2019, on CBC Television after a six-year hiatus from the sport, featuring seven couples.

Ron MacLean returns as host alongside head judge Kurt Browning, with Colby Armstrong joining the judging panel permanently after suffering an injury that ruled him out of the competition. The season featured a rotation of guest judges, with Tessa Virtue & Scott Moir serving as guest judges during Week 1. The season rotated between three venues, with the first three weeks taking place at the FirstOntario Centre in Hamilton, Ontario, Week 4 taking place at the Paramount Fine Foods Centre in Mississauga, Ontario and the last three weeks in Oshawa, with two weeks at the Tributes Community Centre and the finale taking place at the Ryerson's Mattamy Athletic Centre.

For the first time in the show's history, viewers from outside Canada are allowed to view the dances and vote for their favourite couples. The scoring also changed from a 6.0 to a 10.0 system for Week 1, referring back to the 6.0 system from Week 2 onwards.

== Couples ==
Hockey player	Team/s played	Professional Partner	Charities	Status
Amanda Kessel	Metropolitan Riveters; United States	Eric Radford	SickKids Foundation (Kessel); Egale (Radford)	Eliminated 1st on September 26, 2019
Brian McGrattan	Ottawa Senators; Phoenix Coyotes; Calgary Flames; Nashville Predators	Vanessa James	Alberta Animal Rescue Crew Society (McGrattan); Alzheimer Society of Canada (James)	Eliminated 2nd on October 3, 2019
P. J. Stock^{‡}	New York Rangers; Montreal Canadiens; Philadelphia Flyers; Boston Bruins	Violetta Afanasieva	ALS Society of Quebec (Stock); Humane Society of Kawartha Lakes (Afanasieva)	Eliminated 3rd on October 17, 2019
Colton Orr	Boston Bruins; New York Rangers; Toronto Maple Leafs	Amanda Evora	Smile Zone (Orr); Boys and Girls Club of Canada (Evora)	Eliminated 4th on October 24, 2019
Bruno Gervais	New York Islanders; Tampa Bay Lightning; Philadelphia Flyers	Ekaterina Gordeeva	Gervais-Talbot Foundation (Gervais); Heart and Stroke Foundation (Gordeeva)	Third place on October 31, 2019
Natalie Spooner	Mississauga Chiefs; Toronto Furies; Team Canada	Andrew Poje	Fast and Female (Spooner); Right to Play (Poje)	Second place on October 31, 2019
Sheldon Kennedy	Detroit Red Wings; Calgary Flames; Boston Bruins	Kaitlyn Weaver	Canadian Tire Jumpstart Charities	Winners on October 31, 2019

^{‡} Afanasieva's original partner for season five was Colby Armstrong, who suffered an injury before the season began. P.J. Stock, who was Afanasieva's partner in season two, took his place from Week 2 onwards, while Armstrong served as a permanent judge throughout the season.

== Scoring Chart ==
Red numbers indicate the couples with the lowest score for each week.
Green numbers indicate the couples with the highest score for each week.
indicates the couple(s) eliminated that week.
indicates the returning couple that finished in the bottom two the previous week, but won the Skate-Off.
indicates the Skate-Off finished in a draw.
indicates the winning couple.
indicates the runner-up couple.
indicates the third-place couple.

Team	Place	1^{[a]}	2	3	4	5	6^{[b]}	7^{[c]}
Kaitlyn & Sheldon	1	28.3	23.7	17.3	18.0	17.5	—N/a	1st
Natalie & Andrew	2	27.9	22.9	17.4	17.4	17.0	17.2	2nd
Ekaterina & Bruno	3	28.2	23.0	17.5	17.2	17.6	—N/a	3rd
Amanda E. & Colton	4	27.4	22.2	16.7	17.0	17.2	17.1	
Violetta & P.J.	5	DNP	22.1	16.9	17.2	17.2		
Vanessa & Brian	6	27.9	22.4	17.0				
Amanda K. & Eric	7	27.7	22.1					

== Judges ==
Each week, Colby Armstrong and Kurt Browning act as judges, with guest judges joining them. With the exception of Week 1, each guest judge gave separate scores to the contestants. Colby Armstrong was also considered a guest judge in Week 1, before joining the panel full-time during Week 2.

Week	Judge	Career	Ref.
1	Tessa Virtue & Scott Moir	Olympic Ice Dance Champions - 2010 & 2018 Ice Dance World Champions - 2010, 2012 & 2017	
1	Colby Armstrong	Ice Hockey World Champion - 2007 9-year NHL veteran	
2	Darcy Tucker	World Junior Ice Hockey Champion - 1995 14-year NHL veteran	
2	Barbara Underhill	Pairs World Champion - 1984 Junior Pairs World Champion - 1978	
3	Marie-France Dubreuil	Ice Dance World Championship Silver Medalist - 2006 & 2007 Battle of the Blades Runner-Up - 2011	
4	Sarah Nurse	Olympic Ice Hockey Silver Medalist - 2018	
5	Meagan Duhamel	Olympic Pairs Bronze Medalist - 2018 Pairs World Champion - 2015 & 2016	
6	Tessa Virtue & Scott Moir		

== Individual songs & scores ==
=== Week 1 ===
Judges scores in order: Colby Armstrong, Tessa Virtue & Scott Moir, Kurt Browning.

Couple	Scores	Song
Amanda E. & Colton	27.4 (9.2, 9.1, 9.1)	"Glory" - The Score
Natalie & Andrew	27.9 (9.3, 9.3, 9.3)	"Canadian Girls" - Dean Brody
Kaitlyn & Sheldon	28.3 (9.4, 9.4, 9.5)	"Wake Me Up" - Avicii
Amanda K. & Eric	27.7 (9.3, 9.2, 9.2)	"Juice" - Lizzo
Vanessa & Brian	27.9 (9.4, 9.3, 9.2)	"Under Your Scars" - Godsmack
Ekaterina & Bruno	28.2 (9.4, 9.4, 9.4)	"I Like the Way" - BodyRockers

=== Week 2 ===
Judges scores in order: Colby Armstrong, Darcy Tucker, Barbara Underhill, Kurt Browning.

Couple	Scores	Song	Status
Violetta & P. J.	22.9 (5.8, 5.8, 5.7, 5.6)	"Addicted to Love" - Alex Clare	Safe
Ekaterina & Bruno	23.0 (5.8, 5.8, 5.8, 5.6)	"A Little Party Never Killed Nobody (All We Got)" - Fergie, Q-Tip & GoonRock	Safe
Vanessa & Brian	22.4 (5.7, 5.7, 5.5, 5.5)	"Broken Wings" - Mr. Mister	Safe
Natalie & Andrew	22.9 (5.7, 5.8, 5.7, 5.7)	"Higher Love" - Kygo & Whitney Houston	Safe
Kaitlyn & Sheldon	23.7 (5.9, 6.0, 5.9, 5.9)	"Hot Stuff" - Donna Summer	Safe
Skate Off
Amanda K. & Eric	22.1 (5.6, 5.6, 5.4, 5.5)	"Strong Enough" - Cher	Lose
Amanda E. & Colton	22.2 (5.6, 5.7, 5.5, 5.4)	"Paint it Black" - Ciara	Win

=== Week 3 - Country Week ===
Judges scores in order: Colby Armstrong, Marie-France Dubreuil, Kurt Browning.

Couple	Scores	Song	Status
Amanda E. & Colton	16.7 (5.6, 5.6, 5.5)	"Old Town Road" - Lil Nas X & Billy Ray Cyrus	Safe
Kaitlyn & Sheldon	17.3 (5.8, 5.8, 5.7)	"Jolene" - Dolly Parton	Safe
Violetta & P.J.	16.9 (5.7, 5.6, 5.6)	"Crazy" - Patsy Cline	Safe
Natalie & Andrew	17.4 (5.9, 5.8, 5.7)	"You Make It Easy" - Jason Aldean	Safe
Skate Off
Vanessa & Brian	17.0 (5.7, 5.7, 5.6)	"Cowboy Casanova" - Carrie Underwood	Lose
Ekaterina & Bruno	17.5 (5.8, 5.9, 5.8)	"Thinking Out Loud" - Ed Sheeran	Win

=== Week 4 - Stage and Screen Week ===
Judges scores in order: Colby Armstrong, Sarah Nurse, Kurt Browning.

Couple	Scores	Song	Movie/TV show	Status
Kaitlyn & Sheldon	18.0 (6.0, 6.0, 6.0)	"Smile" - Nat King Cole	Modern Times	Safe
Natalie & Andrew	17.4 (5.8, 5.8, 5.8)	"Juicy Wiggle" - Redfoo	Alvin and the Chipmunks: The Road Chip	Safe
Amanda E. & Colton	17.0 (5.7, 5.7, 5.6)	"Believer" - Imagine Dragons	Riverdale	Safe
Skate-Off
Violetta & P.J.	17.2 (5.8, 5.7, 5.7)	"Do You Love Me (Now That I Can Dance)" - The Contours	Dirty Dancing	Draw
Ekaterina & Bruno	17.2 (5.7, 5.8, 5.7)	"The Plaza of Execution" - James Horner	The Mask of Zorro	Draw

=== Week 5 - R&B Week ===
Judges scores in order: Colby Armstrong, Meagan Duhamel, Kurt Browning.

Couple	Score	Song	Status
Natalie & Andrew	17.0 (5.7, 5.7, 5.6)	"Powerful" - Major Lazer featuring Ellie Goulding and Tarrus Riley	Safe
Amanda E. & Colton	17.2 (5.8, 5.7, 5.7)	"Rise Up" - Andra Day	Safe
Kaitlyn & Sheldon	17.5 (5.8, 5.9, 5.8)	"U Can't Touch This" - MC Hammer	Safe
Skate-Off
Ekaterina & Bruno	17.6 (5.8, 5.8, 6.0)	"Ain't No Sunshine" - Shawn James	Win
Violetta & P.J	17.2 (5.7, 5.8, 5.7)	"Ain't No Mountain High Enough" - Marvin Gaye & Tammi Terrell	Lose

=== Week 6 ===
==== Round 1 - Couple's Theme Choice ====
Judges scores in order: Colby Armstrong, Tessa Virtue & Scott Moir, Kurt Browning.

In contrast to previous weeks, the skate-off was conducted first.

Couple	Score	Song	Status
Kaitlyn & Sheldon	Not scored	"I'm Still Standing" - Elton John	Safe
Ekaterina & Bruno	Not scored	"Make Me Feel" - Janelle Monáe	Safe
Skate-Off
Natalie & Andrew	17.2 (5.8, 5.8, 5.8)	"Shut Up and Dance" - Walk the Moon	Win
Amanda E. & Colton	17.1 (5.8, 5.7, 5.8)	"Leave a Light On" - Tom Walker	Lose

==== Round 2 - Favourite Performance of the Season ====
Couples performed their favourite routines for the season, although they were not scored by the judges.

Couple	Song	Week Performed	Viewer's Vote
Natalie & Andrew	"Canadian Girls" - Dean Brody	Week 1	Second Place
Kaitlyn & Sheldon	"Smile" - Nat King Cole	Week 4 - Stage and Screen	Winners
Ekaterina & Bruno	"Ain't No Sunshine" - Shawn James	Week 5 - R&B Week	Third Place

== Notes ==
- a Violetta & P.J. were given a bye in Week 1 after it was learned that Colby Armstrong would be forced to withdraw from the competition.
- b Kaitlyn & Sheldon and Ekaterina & Bruno's skates in Week 6 were not scored by the judges.
- c Skates in Week 7 were not scored by the judges.
