= Battle of the Blades season 1 =

Battle of the Blades
- Season 1
- Celebrity winner: Craig Simpson
- Professional winner: Jamie Salé
- No. of episodes: 14

Release
- Original network: CBC
- Original release: 4 October – 16 November 2009

Season chronology
- Next → Season 2

The first season of Battle of the Blades debuted on CBC on October 4, 2009. Eight former NHL ice hockey players were paired with eight professional female figure skaters.

Ron MacLean and Kurt Browning were the hosts for this season. Pairs figure skater and Emmy Award winning choreographer Sandra Bezic was the head judge, with Olympic figure skating champion Dick Button being the other regular judge. Each week had one rotating guest judge. Also, there was a set theme each week that the couples must perform in.

The elimination format is that the couples are scored on their Sunday night performance, but only as a reference guide for the viewers to vote on. The bottom two couples are based solely on the lowest number of viewer votes. On Monday, the bottom two couples are revealed and they skate their Sunday night program once more in the Skate-Off and are then scored by the judges. The couple with the lower judges score from their Monday night performance is then eliminated.

== Couples ==
On June 23, 2009, CBC announced the show along with the first six male competitors. On August 12, 2009, CBC announced the eight female professional figure skaters. The remaining two male competitors and the rest of the cast were announced on August 13, 2009.

NHL Player	Team(s) Played	Professional partner	Status
Bob Probert	Detroit Red Wings; Chicago Blackhawks	Kristina Lenko	Eliminated 1st on October 5, 2009
Glenn Anderson	Edmonton Oilers; Toronto Maple Leafs; New York Rangers; St. Louis Blues	Isabelle Brasseur	Eliminated 2nd on October 12, 2009
Ron Duguay	New York Rangers; Detroit Red Wings; Pittsburgh Penguins; Los Angeles Kings	Barbara Underhill	Eliminated 3rd on October 19, 2009
Ken Daneyko	New Jersey Devils	Jodeyne Higgins	Eliminated 4th on October 26, 2009
Tie Domi	Toronto Maple Leafs; New York Rangers; Winnipeg Jets	Christine Hough-Sweeney	Eliminated 5th on November 2, 2009
Stéphane Richer	New Jersey Devils; Montreal Canadiens; Tampa Bay Lightning; St. Louis Blues; Pittsburgh Penguins	Marie-France Dubreuil	Third Place on November 16, 2009
Claude Lemieux	Montreal Canadiens; New Jersey Devils; Colorado Avalanche; New Jersey Devils; Phoenix Coyotes; Dallas Stars; San Jose Sharks	Shae-Lynn Bourne	Second Place on November 16, 2009
Craig Simpson	Edmonton Oilers; Pittsburgh Penguins; Buffalo Sabres	Jamie Salé	Winners on November 16, 2009

== Scoring Chart ==
Red numbers indicate the couples with the lowest score for each week.
Green numbers indicate the couples with the highest score for each week.
indicates the couple (or couples) eliminated that week.
indicates the returning couple that finished in the bottom two.
indicates the couple withdrew from the competition.
indicates the winning couple.
indicates the runner-up couple.
indicates the third-place couple.

Team	Place	1	2	3	4	5	6	7
Craig & Jamie	1	16.8	17.3	17.0	17.7	17.7	17.2+17.6=34.8	18.0
Claude & Shae-Lynn	2	17.0	17.4	17.5	17.0	17.5	17.6+17.8=35.4	18.0
Stéphane & Marie-France	3	16.2	17.0	17.2	17.1	17.3	17.8+17.6=35.4	18.0
Tie & Christine	4	17.0	17.0	16.9	17.3	17.1		
Ken & Jodeyne	5	16.5	16.6	16.2	16.5			
Ron & Barb	6	17.3	16.8	16.6				
Glenn & Isabelle	7	16.9	16.3					
Bob & Kristina	8	16.0						

- In Week 6, even though Craig & Jamie and Stéphane & Marie-France were announced as the bottom two couples, no elimination took place as Marie-France Dubreuil had a back injury during practice and was unable to perform in the Skate-Off. Therefore, head judge Sandra Bezic declared that all three couples would move on to Week 7.

=== Skate-Off Chart ===
Week	Bottom Two Couples	Music	Score	Eliminated Couple
1	Stéphane & Marie-France	"We Will Rock You" – Queen	16.6 (5.5, 5.5, 5.6)	Bob & Kristina
1	Bob & Kristina	"Born to Be Wild" – Steppenwolf	16.3 (5.4, 5.4, 5.5)	Bob & Kristina
2	Glenn & Isabelle	"Ain't She Sweet" – Frank Sinatra	16.9 (N/A, N/A, N/A)	Glenn & Isabelle
2	Stéphane & Marie-France	"Strangers in the Night" – Frank Sinatra	17.4 (5.8, 5.8, 5.8)	Glenn & Isabelle
3	Ron & Barb	"Sway" – Michael Bublé	16.6 (5.5, 5.5, 5.6)	Ron & Barb
3	Tie & Christine	"Rico Suave" – Gerardo	16.9 (5.6, 5.6, 5.7)	Ron & Barb
4	Tie & Christine	"Superman" – Robin Thicke	17.1 (5.7, 5.7, 5.7)	Ken & Jodeyne
4	Ken & Jodeyne	"I Got You (I Feel Good)" – James Brown	16.8 (5.6, 5.6, 5.6)	Ken & Jodeyne
5	Tie & Christine	"These Boots Are Made For Walkin'" – Jessica Simpson from The Dukes of Hazzard	16.6 (5.6, 5.5, 5.5)	Tie & Christine
5	Stéphane & Marie-France	"Blues in the Night" – Quincy Jones from Ocean's Eleven	17.4 (5.8, 5.8, 5.8)	Tie & Christine

== Average chart ==
Note: Skate-Off scores are not included in this chart. Only Sunday night performances are averaged.

Rank by average	Place	Couple	Total	Number of skates	Average
1	2	Claude & Shae-Lynn	139.8	8	17.48
2	1	Craig & Jamie	139.3	8	17.41
3	3	Stéphane & Marie-France	138.2	8	17.28
4	4	Tie & Christine	85.3	5	17.06
5	6	Ron & Barb	50.7	3	16.90
6	7	Glenn & Isabelle	33.2	2	16.60
7	5	Ken & Jodeyne	65.8	4	16.45
8	8	Bob & Kristina	16.0	1	16.00

== Weekly themes and guest judges ==
Week	Theme	Guest Judge
1	Classic Rock	Kelly Hrudey
2	Frank Sinatra	Don Cherry
3	Latin	George Stroumboulopoulos
4	R&B	Lanny McDonald
5	Hollywood Films	Bret Hedican and Kristi Yamaguchi
6	Canadian Hits & the Couple's Best Performance	Katarina Witt
7	Freestyle (Couple's Choice)	Doug Gilmour

== Individual scores & songs ==
=== Week 1 ===
Individual judges scores in charts below (given in parentheses) are listed in this order from left to right:
Kelly Hrudey, Sandra Bezic, Dick Button.

Running order

Couple	Score	Music
Claude & Shae-Lynn	17.0 (5.7, 5.7, 5.6)	"Bad to the Bone" – George Thorogood & the Destroyers
Craig & Jamie	16.8 (5.6, 5.6, 5.6)	"Rocky Mountain Way" – Joe Walsh
Ken & Jodeyne	16.5 (5.7, 5.4, 5.4)	"Wild Thing" – The Troggs
Stéphane & Marie-France	16.2 (5.5, 5.4, 5.3)	"We Will Rock You" – Queen
Bob & Kristina	16.0 (5.4, 5.3, 5.3)	"Born to Be Wild" – Steppenwolf
Glenn & Isabelle	16.9 (5.7, 5.6, 5.6)	"Takin' Care of Business" – Bachman–Turner Overdrive
Ron & Barb	17.3 (5.8, 5.7, 5.8)	"Unchain My Heart – Joe Cocker
Tie & Christine	17.0 (5.7, 5.6, 5.7)	"(I Can't Get No) Satisfaction" – The Rolling Stones

=== Week 2 ===
Individual judges scores in charts below (given in parentheses) are listed in this order from left to right:
Don Cherry, Sandra Bezic, Dick Button.

Couple	Score	Music
Glenn & Isabelle	16.3 (5.5, 5.4, 5.4)	"Ain't She Sweet" – Frank Sinatra
Ron & Barb	16.8 (5.7, 5.6, 5.5)	"Fly Me to the Moon" – Frank Sinatra
Ken & Jodeyne	16.6 (5.6, 5.6, 5.4)	"Strangers in the Night" – Frank Sinatra
Tie & Christine	17.0 (5.7, 5.7, 5.6)	"That's Life" - Frank Sinatra
Stéphane & Marie-France	17.0 (N/A, N/A, N/A)	"Strangers in the Night" – Frank Sinatra
Claude & Shae-Lynn	17.4 (N/A, N/A, N/A)	N/A
Craig & Jamie	17.3 (N/A, N/A, N/A)	N/A

=== Week 3 ===
Individual judges scores in charts below (given in parentheses) are listed in this order from left to right:
George Stroumboulopoulos, Sandra Bezic, Dick Button.

Running order

Couple	Score	Music
Craig & Jamie	17.0 (5.7, 5.7, 5.6)	"I Know You Want Me (Calle Ocho)" – Pitbull
Ken & Jodeyne	16.2 (5.4, 5.4, 5.4)	"Tico-Tico no Fubá" – Don Swan and his Orchestra
Stéphane & Marie-France	17.2 (5.7, 5.7, 5.8)	"Dance with Me" – Debelah Morgan
Claude & Shae-Lynn	17.5 (5.8, 5.8, 5.9)	"Assassin's Tango" – John Powell
Tie & Christine	16.9 (5.7, 5.6, 5.6)	"Rico Suave" – Gerardo
Ron & Barb	16.6 (5.6, 5.5, 5.5)	"Sway" – Michael Bublé

=== Week 4 ===
Individual judges scores in charts below (given in parentheses) are listed in this order from left to right:
Lanny McDonald, Sandra Bezic, Dick Button.

Running order

Couple	Score	Music
Ken & Jodeyne	16.5 (5.4, 5.6, 5.5)	"I Got You (I Feel Good)" – James Brown
Claude & Shae-Lynn	17.0 (5.6, 5.7, 5.7)	"Superstition" – Stevie Wonder
Stéphane & Marie-France	17.1 (5.8, 5.7, 5.6)	"It's a Man's Man's Man's World" – Seal
Tie & Christine	17.3 (5.7, 5.8, 5.8)	"Superman" – Robin Thicke
Craig & Jamie	17.7 (5.9, 5.9, 5.9)	"Play That Funky Music" – Wild Cherry

=== Week 5 ===
Individual judges scores in charts below (given in parentheses) are listed in this order from left to right:
Bret Hedican and Kristi Yamaguchi, Sandra Bezic, Dick Button.

Running order

Couple	Score	Music
Stéphane & Marie-France	17.3 (5.8, 5.8, 5.7)	"Blues in the Night" – Quincy Jones from Ocean's Eleven
Claude & Shae-Lynn	17.5 (5.9, 5.9, 5.7)	"(I've Had) The Time of My Life" – Bill Medley & Jennifer Warnes from Dirty Dancing
Craig & Jamie	17.7 (5.9, 5.9, 5.9)	"Soul Bossa Nova" – Quincy Jones from Austin Powers: International Man of Mystery
Tie & Christine	17.1 (5.8, 5.7, 5.6)	"These Boots Are Made For Walkin'" – Jessica Simpson from The Dukes of Hazzard
Group performance	Not scored	"I Don't Want to Miss a Thing" – Aerosmith from Armageddon

=== Week 6 ===
Individual judges scores in charts below (given in parentheses) are listed in this order from left to right:
Katarina Witt, Sandra Bezic, Dick Button.

Running order

Couple	Score	Music
Claude & Shae-Lynn	17.6 (5.9, 5.9, 5.8)	"Hallelujah" – Claude Lemieux
Claude & Shae-Lynn	17.8 (6.0, 5.9, 5.9)	"Assassin's Tango" – John Powell
Craig & Jamie	17.2 (5.8, 5.7, 5.7)	"Heaven" – Bryan Adams
Craig & Jamie	17.6 (6.0, 5.8, 5.8)	"Soul Bossa Nova" – Quincy Jones from Austin Powers: International Man of Mystery
Stéphane & Marie-France	17.8 (5.9, 6.0, 5.9)	"Try" – Blue Rodeo
Stéphane & Marie-France	17.6 (6.0, 5.8, 5.8)	"Dance with Me" – Debelah Morgan

=== Week 7 ===
Individual judges scores in charts below (given in parentheses) are listed in this order from left to right:
Doug Gilmour, Sandra Bezic, Dick Button.

Running order

Couple	Score	Music
Craig & Jamie	18.0 (6.0, 6.0, 6.0)	"I Gotta Feeling" – The Black Eyed Peas
Claude & Shae-Lynn	18.0 (6.0, 6.0, 6.0)	"A Moment Like This" – Kelly Clarkson
Stéphane & Marie-France	18.0 (6.0, 6.0, 6.0)	"Lady" – Kenny Rogers

== Weekly ratings ==
Weekly ratings and rankings are measured by BBM Canada, an audience measurement organization for Canadian television and radio broadcasting.

Episode Number	Episode	Viewers (in millions)	Rank	Reference
101	Week 1: Performance (Airdate: October 4, 2009)	1.959	#16	
102	Week 1: Results (Airdate: October 5, 2009)	1.07	N/A	
103	Week 2: Performance (Airdate: October 11, 2009)	1.562	#19	
104	Week 2: Results (Airdate: October 12, 2009)	1.24	N/A	
105	Week 3: Performance (Airdate: October 18, 2009)	1.578	#21	
106	Week 3: Results (Airdate: October 19, 2009)	1.140	#29	
107	Week 4: Performance (Airdate: October 25, 2009)	1.553	#18	
108	Week 4: Results (Airdate: October 26, 2009)	1.304	#23	
109	Week 5: Performance (Airdate: November 1, 2009)	1.618	#19	
110	Week 5: Results (Airdate: November 2, 2009)	1.143	#29	
111	Week 6: Performance (Airdate: November 8, 2009)	1.810	#18	
112	Week 6: Results (Airdate: November 9, 2009)	1.06	N/A	
113	Week 7: Performance (Airdate: November 15, 2009)	1.878	#16	
114	Week 7: Results – Season Finale (Airdate: November 16, 2009)	1.736	#19	
	Season 1 Average: Performance Shows	1.737	#18	
	Season 1 Average: Results Shows	1.270	#28	
	Season 1 Average: Complete	1.504	#23	
