= Battle of the Blades season 4 =

Battle of the Blades
- Season 4
- Celebrity winner: Scott Thornton
- Professional winner: Amanda Evora
- No. of episodes: 9

Release
- Original network: CBC
- Original release: September 22 – November 17, 2013

Season chronology
- ← Previous; Season 3 Next → Season 5

The fourth season of Battle of the Blades premiered on September 22, 2013, as a part of CBC's fall line-up after a two-year hiatus. Like previous seasons, this season showcases a lineup of 8 couples.

Ron MacLean returns as the show's host. Former co-host Kurt Browning assumes judging duties on a new judging panel, along with Olympic figure skating gold medalist and season one champion Jamie Salé, and former NHL player and season two competitor P.J. Stock. This season does not feature rotating guest judges every week. The show venue for this season continues to be at the MasterCard Centre in Etobicoke, Toronto, Ontario.

There are no Monday night results show this season; therefore, elimination takes place at the end of each Sunday night performance shows from Week 2 onwards. The judges score and viewer votes from the previous week determine the bottom two couples on the current week's show, which are announced at the top of the programme. The bottom two couples perform their new routines in the "Skate-Off" at the end of the episode after the couples who are safe have skated. The judges would then score their performances and the couple with the lower judges score is eliminated. The score for the remaining couple's performance would count as their score for the week. The one-time use Judge's Save returned for this season.

Viewer voting this season is solely done on the show's official website, eliminating the telephone and texting options. Each unregistered visitor gets one vote. Registered visitors can earn additional votes by completing their profile and other activities and challenges on the website.

== Casting ==
The official cast announcement were made from September 15 to September 20 on the show's website. Along with the eight new ex-NHL hockey players, the female figure skating professionals were also announced; but the pairings of the two were only announced on the season premiere preview show, "Made in Canada", which aired on September 22. Unlike the previous season, which introduced a female hockey player competitor, this season featured solely male hockey players, as per the first two seasons.

Of the eight female skaters, four were returning participants: season 1 & 2 first runner-up Shae-Lynn Bourne, season 1 second runner-up & season 3 first runner-up Marie-France Dubreuil, season 2 & 3 competitor Violetta Afanasieva, and season 3 competitor Marcy Hinzmann. The four new female skaters are Oksana Kazakova, Sinead Kerr, Jessica Dubé, and Amanda Evora.

== Couples ==
Hockey player	Team(s) played	Professional partner	Charity playing for	Status
Mike Krushelnyski	Boston Bruins; Edmonton Oilers; Los Angeles Kings; Toronto Maple Leafs; Detroit Red Wings	Marcy Hinzmann	NHL Alumni - Hockey's Greatest Family	Eliminated 1st on October 6, 2013
Vladimir Malakhov	New York Islanders; Montreal Canadiens; New Jersey Devils; New York Rangers; Philadelphia Flyers	Oksana Kazakova	iOrphan	Eliminated 2nd on October 13, 2013
Anson Carter	Washington Capitals; Boston Bruins; Edmonton Oilers; New York Rangers; Los Angeles Kings; Vancouver Canucks; Columbus Blue Jackets; Carolina Hurricanes	Shae-Lynn Bourne	World Vision Starting Strong Program (Bourne); Shirt Off My Back (Carter)	Eliminated 3rd on October 27, 2013
Brian Savage	Montreal Canadiens; Phoenix Coyotes; St. Louis Blues; Philadelphia Flyers	Jessica Dubé	Multiple Sclerosis Society of Canada (Dubé); 10 Rainbows Children's Foundation, Meghan's Wings (Savage)	Eliminated 4th on November 3, 2013
Grant Marshall	Columbus Blue Jackets; Dallas Stars; New Jersey Devils	Sinead Kerr	Autism Speaks Canada (Kerr); Parachute (Grant)	Eliminated 5th on November 3, 2013
Mathieu Dandenault	Detroit Red Wings; Montreal Canadiens	Marie-France Dubreuil	Canadian Breast Cancer Foundation (Dubreuil); Montreal Canadiens Children's Foundation (Dandenault)	Third Place on November 17, 2013
Jason Strudwick	New York Islanders; Vancouver Canucks; Chicago Blackhawks; New York Rangers; Edmonton Oilers	Violetta Afanasieva	Humane Society of Kawartha Lakes (Afanasieva); Edmonton Inner City Children's Program (Strudwick)	Second Place on November 17, 2013
Scott Thornton	Toronto Maple Leafs; Edmonton Oilers; Montreal Canadiens; Dallas Stars; San Jose Sharks; Los Angeles Kings	Amanda Evora	Canadian Breast Cancer Foundation	Winners on November 17, 2013

== Scoring Chart ==
Red numbers indicate the couples with the lowest score for each week.
Green numbers indicate the couples with the highest score for each week.
indicates the couple(s) eliminated that week.
indicates the returning couple that finished in the bottom two the previous week, but won the Skate-Off.
indicates the returning couple that was saved by the judges using "The Judges' Save" after being eliminated in the Skate-Off the same night.
indicates the winning couple.
indicates the runner-up couple.
indicates the third-place couple.

Team	Place	1	2	3	4	5	6^{[a]}	7^{[b]}
Scott & Amanda	1	16.4	16.8	17.1	17.3	17.4	18.0	1st
Jason & Violetta	2	16.6	17.1	17.4	17.1	17.8	18.0	2nd
Mathieu & Marie-France	3	16.8	17.0	17.3	17.6	17.7	17.8	3rd
Grant & Sinead	4	16.8	17.3	16.8	17.1	17.8	17.3	
Brian & Jessica	5	16.4	16.2	16.7	16.9	16.9	17.2	
Anson & Shae-Lynn	6	16.8	16.8	16.7	16.9	17.2		
Vladimir & Oksana	7	16.3	16.7	16.7				
Mike & Marcy	8	16.1	16.3					

- a Week 6 featured a double elimination. Brian and Jessica were eliminated for being the bottom two couple losing the Skate-Off (against Mathieu and Marie-France). Grant and Sinead were eliminated as the couple remaining (after the elimination of Brian and Jessica) that had the lowest judges score.
- b Skates in Week 7 were not scored by the judges.

== Average chart ==
Rank by average	Place	Couple	Total	Number of skates	Average
1	3	Mathieu & Marie-France	104.2	6	17.37
2	2	Jason & Violetta	104.0	6	17.33
3	4	Grant & Sinead	103.1	6	17.18
4	1	Scott & Amanda	103.0	6	17.17
5	6	Anson & Shae-Lynn	84.4	5	16.88
6	5	Brian & Jessica	100.3	6	16.72
7	7	Vladimir & Oksana	49.7	3	16.57
8	8	Mike & Marcy	32.4	2	16.20

== Individual scores & songs ==
Individual judges scores in charts below (given in parentheses) are listed in this order from left to right unless specified: Kurt Browning, Jamie Salé, P. J. Stock.

=== Week 1 ===
Weekly Theme: Rock

Running order

Couple	Score	Music
Grant & Sinead	16.8 (5.6, 5.6, 5.6)	"Hands Up" – Hedley
Mathieu & Marie-France	16.8 (5.5, 5.7, 5.6)	"Gimme Shelter" – Holy Soldier
Mike & Marcy	16.1 (5.3, 5.4, 5.4)	"50 Ways to Say Goodbye" – Train
Scott & Amanda	16.4 (5.4, 5.5, 5.5)	"Up in the Air" – Thirty Seconds to Mars
Vladimir & Oksana	16.3 (5.4, 5.4, 5.5)	"Where Do We Draw The Line?" – Poets of the Fall
Jason & Violetta	16.6 (5.5, 5.5, 5.6)	"Treasure" – Bruno Mars
Brian & Jessica	16.4 (5.5, 5.4, 5.5)	"Every Rose Has Its Thorn" – Poison
Anson & Shae-Lynn	16.8 (5.6, 5.6, 5.6)	"Seven Nation Army" – The White Stripes

=== Week 2 ===
Weekly Theme: Suit and Tie: Dance Classics
Bottom Two Couples: Mike & Marcy, Vladimir & Oksana
Eliminated Couple: Mike & Marcy

Running order

Couple	Score	Music
Brian & Jessica	16.2 (5.3, 5.5, 5.4)	"Is You Is Or Is You Ain't My Baby" – Dinah Washington
Scott & Amanda	16.8 (5.5, 5.7, 5.6)	"Hit the Road Jack" – Renee Olstead
Jason & Violetta	17.1 (5.7, 5.7, 5.7)	"It's De-Lovely" – Robbie Williams
Anson & Shae-Lynn	16.8 (5.4, 5.8, 5.6)	"Unforgettable" – Natalie Cole with Nat King Cole
Grant & Sinead	17.3 (5.7, 5.8, 5.8)	"Takes Two to Tango" – Louis Armstrong
Mathieu & Marie-France	17.0 (5.6, 5.8, 5.6)	"Stormy Weather" – Etta James
Mike & Marcy	16.3 (5.4, 5.4, 5.5)	"Perhaps, Perhaps, Perhaps" – Doris Day
Vladimir & Oksana	16.7 (5.5, 5.6, 5.6)	"That's Life" – Michael Bublé

=== Week 3 ===
Weekly Theme: International Beats
Bottom Two Couples: Vladimir & Oksana, Mathieu & Marie-France
Eliminated Couple: Vladimir & Oksana

Running order

Couple	Score	Music
Scott & Amanda	17.1 (5.7, 5.7, 5.7)	"Lions" – Kodo (Japan)
Anson & Shae-Lynn	16.7 (5.6, 5.6, 5.5)	"Hi-a Ma (Pata Pata)" – Milk & Sugar featuring Miriam Makeba (South Africa)
Jason & Violetta	17.4 (5.8, 5.8, 5.8)	"Vesalaya Kadril" – Svetoch (Russian Folk Music)
Brian & Jessica	16.7 (5.6, 5.6, 5.5)	"Alejandro" – Lady Gaga (Latin)
Grant & Sinead	16.8 (5.6, 5.6, 5.6)	"Fairy Dance" – Ashley MacIsaac (Celtic)
Vladimir & Oksana	16.7 (5.6, 5.6, 5.5)	"Я Тебе Не Веою (I Don't Believe You)" – Irina Allegrova, Grigory Leps (Russia)
Mathieu & Marie-France	17.3 (5.8, 5.8, 5.7)	"Gentleman" – PSY (South Korea)

=== Week 4 ===
Weekly Theme: Fan's Choice: The Great Canadian Songbook
Bottom Two Couples: Grant & Sinead, Anson & Shae-Lynn
Eliminated Couple: None (Anson & Shae-Lynn saved using the Judges' Save)

Running order

Couple	Score	Music
Jason & Violetta	17.1 (5.7, 5.8, 5.6)	"Kiss You Inside Out" – Hedley
Mathieu & Marie-France	17.6 (5.9, 5.9, 5.8)	"After the Rain" – Blue Rodeo
Brian & Jessica	16.9 (5.7, 5.7, 5.5)	"Stutter" – Marianas Trench
Scott & Amanda	17.3 (5.8, 5.8, 5.7)	"Closer to the Heart" – Rush
Grant & Sinead	17.1 (5.6, 5.8, 5.7)	"Black Velvet" – Alannah Myles
Anson & Shae-Lynn	16.9 (5.6, 5.7, 5.6)	"Run to You" – Bryan Adams

=== Week 5 ===
Weekly Theme: Iconic Duos
Bottom Two Couples: Grant & Sinead, Anson & Shae-Lynn
Eliminated Couple: Anson & Shae-Lynn

Running order

Couple	Score	Music
Mathieu & Marie-France	17.7 (5.9, 5.9, 5.9)	"Walk Like an Egyptian" – The Bangles (Cleopatra & Mark Antony)
Brian & Jessica	16.9 (5.7, 5.6, 5.6)	"You've Lost That Lovin' Feelin'" – The Righteous Brothers (Maverick & Charlie)
Scott & Amanda	17.4 (5.8, 5.8, 5.8)	"Renegade" – Styx (Bonnie and Clyde)
Jason & Violetta	17.8 (6.0, 5.9, 5.9)	"The Pink Panther Theme" – Henry Mancini (Pink Panther & Inspector Clouseau)
Anson & Shae-Lynn	17.2 (5.7, 5.8, 5.7)	"Clubbed to Death (Kurayamino Variation)" – Rob Dougan (Morpheus & Trinity)
Grant & Sinead	17.8 (5.9, 6.0, 5.9)	"Cheek to Cheek" – Ella Fitzgerald (Fred Astaire & Ginger Rogers)

=== Week 6 ===
Weekly Theme: The Winter Olympics
Bottom Two Couples: Brian & Jessica, Mathieu & Marie-France
Eliminated Couples: Brian & Jessica (Skate-Off); Grant & Sinead (Lowest score of remaining couples)

Individual judges scores for Week 6 (given in parentheses) are listed in this order from left to right: David Pelletier, Jamie Salé, P. J. Stock.

Running order

Couple	Score	Music
Scott & Amanda	18.0 (6.0, 6.0, 6.0)	"Boléro" – Maurice Ravel; Inspired by Jayne Torvill & Christopher Dean at the 1984 Winter Olympics
Grant & Sinead	17.3 (5.8, 5.8, 5.7)	"Symphony No. 5" – Gustav Mahler; Inspired by Tessa Virtue & Scott Moir at the 2010 Winter Olympics
Jason & Violetta	18.0 (6.0, 6.0, 6.0)	"Maple Leaf Rag" – Scott Joplin; Inspired by Tracy Wilson & Scott McCall at the 1988 Winter Olympics
Brian & Jessica	17.2 (5.7, 5.8, 5.7)	"Moonlight Sonata" – Ludwig van Beethoven; Inspired by Ekaterina Gordeeva & Sergei Grinkov at the 1994 Winter Olympics
Mathieu & Marie-France	17.8 (6.0, 5.9, 5.9)	"(Where Do I Begin?) Love Story" – Francis Lai; Inspired by Jamie Salé & David Pelletier at the 2002 Winter Olympics

=== Week 7 ===
Weekly Theme: Final Three Couples
None of the skates in Week 7 were scored.

Running order

Couple	Score	Music
Scott & Amanda	Not scored	"Breathing Underwater" – Metric
Scott & Amanda	Not scored	"Boléro" – Maurice Ravel (Reprise of Week 6 skate)
Jason & Violetta	Not scored	"The Edge of Glory" – Lady Gaga
Jason & Violetta	Not scored	"The Pink Panther Theme" – Henry Mancini (Reprise of Week 5 skate)
Mathieu & Marie-France	Not scored	"I'm Gonna Love You Through It" – Martina McBride
Mathieu & Marie-France	Not scored	"Gentleman" – PSY (Reprise of Week 3 skate)

== Weekly ratings ==
Weekly ratings and rankings are measured by BBM Canada, an audience measurement organization for Canadian television and radio broadcasting. Weekly ranks are based on weeks starting on Monday and ending on Sunday.

Episode Number	Episode	Viewers (in millions)	Timeslot Rank	Nightly Rank	Weekly Rank	Reference
400	Made in Canada (Airdate: September 22, 2013)	0.771	#3	#8	#28	
401	Week 1: Rock (Airdate: September 29, 2013)	1.004	TBA	TBA	TBA	
402	Week 2: Suit & Tie (Airdate: October 6, 2013)	1.066	TBA	TBA	TBA	
403	Week 3: International Beats (Airdate: October 13, 2013)	1.049	TBA	TBA	TBA	
404	Week 4: The Canadian Songbook (Airdate: October 20, 2013)	1.026	TBA	TBA	TBA	
405	Week 5: Iconic Duos (Airdate: October 27, 2013)	0.896	TBA	TBA	TBA	
406	Week 6: The Winter Olympics (Airdate: November 3, 2013)	1.110	#2	#7	#30	
407	Week 7: Final 3 Couples (Airdate: November 10, 2013)	1.078	TBA	TBA	TBA	
