= Battle of the Blades =

- Created by: Sandra Bezic; Kevin Albrecht
- Presented by: Ron MacLean; Keshia Chanté (2020); Kurt Browning (2009–2011); Maura Grierson (2011)
- Judges: see below
- Opening theme: "There Will Never Be Another Tonight" performed by Bryan Adams
- Country of origin: Canada
- No. of seasons: 6
- No. of episodes: 65

Production
- Production locations: Maple Leaf Gardens; Toronto, Ontario (season 1); Pinewood Toronto Studios; Toronto, Ontario (season 2); MasterCard Centre; Etobicoke, Ontario (seasons 3–4); FirstOntario Centre; Hamilton, Ontario (season 5); CAA Centre; Brampton, Ontario (season 6)
- Running time: 60-120 minutes (performance shows); 30-60 minutes (results show) (times include commercials)
- Production company: Insight Productions

Original release
- Network: CBC Television
- Release: October 4, 2009 – November 17, 2013
- Release: September 19, 2019 – November 20, 2020

Battle of the Blades (or BOTB for short) is a Canadian figure skating reality show and competition on CBC Television. The show originally aired for four seasons between 2009 and 2013. It was revived for a fifth season in 2019. It was first broadcast before a live audience at the historic Maple Leaf Gardens. However, with Maple Leaf Gardens under renovation, the show was filmed at Pinewood Toronto Studios in season two. The venue moved again in season three to MasterCard Centre located in Etobicoke, Ontario. For the revived fifth season in 2019, the venue was at the FirstOntario Centre in Hamilton, Ontario. The venue changed again in the sixth season to the CAA Centre, located in Brampton, Ontario.

== Description and history ==
The series resembles the international reality show Dancing with the Stars and is similar in concept to Dancing On Ice from the UK. The biggest difference, and the show's main "hook", is that Battle of the Blades brings two very different styles of skaters together: hockey players are paired with prominent figure skaters to perform figure skating routines. During the first two seasons, contestants were strictly male hockey players from the NHL, paired with female figure skaters. In Season Three, Tessa Bonhomme was cast as the first female hockey player contestant, making her partner, David Pelletier the show's first male professional figure skating competitor.

In 2010, the French-language CBC's counterpart, Télévision de Radio-Canada, was planning to air a Quebec version, but did not decide if it would be an adaptation or a French-dubbed version. The show's executive producer thinks that it may also interest other countries like Russia.

On April 19, 2012, CBC announced that due to budget cuts by the Canadian federal government, Battle of the Blades had been put on "hiatus" and would not appear on the 2012 fall schedule, stating that the network could not afford the high production costs of the show. Although not technically cancelled by CBC, executive producer John Brunton mentioned that the show may search for other network alternatives to produce future seasons.

On April 3, 2013, CBC announced that Battle of the Blades would return in Fall 2013 after a one-year hiatus.

With the loss of Hockey Night in Canada rights to Rogers Media, Battle of the Blades was officially cancelled by CBC on April 10, 2014, due to federal budget cuts, declining advertising revenues and television ratings. In addition, CBC subsequently announced it would no longer compete for any professional sporting rights of any kind.

The CBC revived the show in 2019, in response to demand from the public. The show was renewed for a sixth season for the Fall 2020 lineup.

== Scoring and elimination structure ==
=== Scoring ===
Each judge can award a score of up to 6.0, as in official figure skating competitions. The highest score a team can achieve in a performance is 18.0.

=== Elimination ===
In the first season, the team were scored on their Sunday night performance, but only as a reference guide for the viewers to vote on. The bottom two teams were ranked based solely on the lowest number of viewer votes. Viewers can either text, call or log onto the show's official website to cast their votes. On Monday, the bottom two teams are revealed and they skate their Sunday night program once more in the Skate-Off and are then scored by the judges. The team with the lower judges score from their Monday night performance is then eliminated.

The rules of elimination were slightly altered in the second season. The scores from the teams' Sunday night performance are now added to the viewers' voting to determine the bottom two couples. Also, instead of scoring the bottom two teams on their Skate-Off performance, the judges are now just asked to vote on the team of their choice. The team with the fewer number of judges' votes is then eliminated.

Midway during the second season, it was announced that Week Five would be a "Second Chance" competition for the couples eliminated thus far in the season. The team with the highest combined total of viewer's vote and judges score would be reinstated as of Week Six, re-joining the top four team in the competition.

Season three introduced the Judge's Save, which is a one-time use per season tool that needed the consensus of all judges that would reinstate a team that was eliminated that same episode back into the competition.

The Monday night results show was cancelled in season four, and therefore elimination takes place at the end of each Sunday night performance show from Week 2 onwards. The judges score and viewer votes from the previous week determine the bottom two teams on the current week's show. The bottom two teams skate-off at the end of the episode, performing their new routines. The judges would then score their performances and the team with the lower judges score is then eliminated. Also, viewer voting starting this season is solely done on the show's official website. Each unregistered visitor gets one vote. Registered visitors can earn additional votes by completing their profile and other activities and challenges on the website.

== Cast ==
=== Hosts and judges ===
Host
Correspondent
Judge
Competitor

Personality	Seasons					
Personality	1	2	3	4	5	6
Ron MacLean						
Keshia Chanté						
Kurt Browning						
Scott Moir						
Natalie Spooner						
Elladj Baldé						
Colby Armstrong						
P. J. Stock						
Jamie Salé						
Maura Grierson						
Jeremy Roenick						
Sandra Bezic						
Dick Button						

The show is hosted by Hockey Night in Canada's Ron MacLean and singer Keshia Chanté. Four-time World Figure Skating Champion Kurt Browning is an "Elite Battle Expert" correspondent, providing colour commentary. Browning had previously hosted from seasons 1 to 3, and was a judge in seasons 4 to 5. Virgin Radio 999 DJ Maura Grierson was added in season three as the "Battle Correspondent", providing viewers with a look backstage, but did not return in subsequent seasons of the show.

In season one, the head judge was Emmy Award winning choreographer and figure skater Sandra Bezic, with Olympic champion Dick Button being the other regular judge. There was also one rotating guest judge each week from the world of hockey or figure skating. Season Two saw the departure of Button and the addition of retired NHL player Jeremy Roenick as the second regular judge. Season Four featured a completely new judging panel with Browning switching from hosting to judging, Olympic figure skating gold medallist and season one champion Jamie Salé, and former NHL player and season two competitor P.J. Stock, with no rotating guest judges. Season five saw the departure of Salé, bringing back the rotating guest judges. In the second week of competition, Stock swapped to become a contestant, filling in for an injured Colby Armstrong, and Armstrong took over as a regular judge in place of Stock. Season six saw another complete overhaul of the judging panel with Olympic ice dancing gold medallist Scott Moir, Olympic ice hockey gold medallist and season 5 runner-up Natalie Spooner, and Junior Canadian figure skating champion Elladj Baldé as regular judges.

=== Competitors ===
Winner
Runner-up
Third place
Eliminated First

Professional	Average Score	Season 1	Season 2	Season 3	Season 4	Season 5	Season 6
(Russia) (Canada) Violetta Afanasieva	17.01		P. J. Stock	Cale Hulse	Jason Strudwick	Colby Armstrong^{[b]} P. J. Stock	Anthony Stewart
(United States) Tanith Belbin	17.09			Boyd Devereaux			
(Russia) Elena Berezhnaya	16.83			Curtis Leschyshyn			
(Canada) Shae-Lynn Bourne	17.28	Claude Lemieux	Patrice Brisebois		Anson Carter		
(Canada) Isabelle Brasseur	17.15	Glenn Anderson	Todd Warriner				
(Canada) Jessica Dubé	16.72				Brian Savage		
(Canada) Marie-France Dubreuil	17.24	Stéphane Richer		Bryan Berard	Mathieu Dandenault		
(Canada) Meagan Duhamel	17.28						Wojtek Wolski
(Canada) Carlotta Edwards	16.87						Kris Versteeg
(United States) Amanda Evora	17.01				Scott Thornton	Colton Orr	
(Russia) Ekaterina Gordeeva	17.38		Valeri Bure			Bruno Gervais	
(Canada) Jodeyne Higgins	16.45	Ken Daneyko					
(Canada) Asher Hill	17.19						Jessica Campbell
(United States) Marcy Hinzmann	16.38			Todd Simpson	Mike Krushelnyski		
(Canada) Christine Hough-Sweeney	17.04	Tie Domi	Russ Courtnall				
(United States) Kyoko Ina	17.08		Kelly Chase				
(France) Vanessa James	16.98					Brian McGrattan	Akim Aliu
(Russia) Oksana Kazakova	16.57				Vladimir Malakhov		
(Scotland) Sinead Kerr	17.18				Grant Marshall		
(Canada) Anabelle Langlois	16.81		Georges Laraque	Brad May			
(Canada) Kristina Lenko	16.00	Bob Probert					
(United States) Kim Navarro	16.63			Wade Belak^{[a]} Russ Courtnall			
(Canada) David Pelletier	17.04			Tessa Bonhomme			
(Canada) Andrew Poje	16.89					Natalie Spooner	Meghan Agosta
(Canada) Eric Radford	16.62					Amanda Kessel	Jennifer Botterill
(Canada) Jamie Salé	17.31	Craig Simpson	Theoren Fleury		N/A (Judge)		
(Canada) Barbara Underhill	16.90	Ron Duguay					
(Canada) Kaitlyn Weaver	17.31					Sheldon Kennedy	Bryan Bickell

Notes

- a Navarro's original partner for season three was Belak. However, Belak died before the start of the season and Courtnall was brought in as the replacement partner for Navarro.
- b Afanasieva's original partner for season five was Armstrong, who suffered an injury before the season began. Stock - Afanasieva's partner in season two - took his place from Week 2 onwards, while Armstrong served as a permanent judge throughout the season.

== Charity ==
Each couple represent one or two charities of their choice. Depending on their placement in the competition, an increasing amount of money is then donated to their charity. The winners of season one, Jamie Salé and Craig Simpson, had CAD 100,000 donated to Spinal Cord Research. In season two, all competitors were guaranteed $25,000 donated to the charity of their choice and $100,000 for the winners Ekaterina Gordeeva and Valeri Bure. In season three, the winners' charity will receive $100,000, second place will receive $35,000, third place will receive $30,000, and the other five charities will receive $25,000.

== Season summaries ==
Season	No. of Stars	No. of weeks	Season Premiere Date	Season Finale Date	Winner	Runner-Up	Third place
1 – Fall 2009	8	7	October 4, 2009	November 16, 2009	Craig Simpson & Jamie Salé	Claude Lemieux & Shae-Lynn Bourne	Stéphane Richer & Marie-France Dubreuil
2 – Fall 2010	8	8	September 26, 2010	November 22, 2010	Valeri Bure & Ekaterina Gordeeva	Patrice Brisebois & Shae-Lynn Bourne	Todd Warriner & Isabelle Brasseur
3 – Fall 2011	8	8	September 18, 2011	November 14, 2011	Tessa Bonhomme & David Pelletier	Bryan Berard & Marie-France Dubreuil	Boyd Devereaux & Tanith Belbin
4 – Fall 2013	8	7	September 22, 2013	November 17, 2013	Scott Thornton & Amanda Evora	Jason Strudwick & Violetta Afanasieva	Mathieu Dandenault & Marie-France Dubreuil
5 – Fall 2019	7	7	September 19, 2019	October 31, 2019	Sheldon Kennedy & Kaitlyn Weaver	Natalie Spooner & Andrew Poje	Bruno Gervais & Ekaterina Gordeeva
6 – Fall 2020	8	6	October 22, 2020	November 26, 2020	Wojtek Wolski & Meagan Duhamel	Jessica Campbell & Asher Hill	Kris Versteeg & Carlotta Edwards

== Injuries ==
=== Professionals ===
- In season one, Marie-France Dubreuil suffered two injuries. Before the season opener, she was accidentally dropped by her partner Stéphane Richer while performing a lift during rehearsals and landed headfirst onto the ice. On the morning of the Week Six result show, she suffered from severe back pain and was unable to perform in the Skate-Off that night. She fully recovered from both injuries and was fit to perform the rest of the season.
- In season two, Anabelle Langlois tripped and fell with her partner, Georges Laraque while practising an on-ice twist during rehearsals on October 27, 2010. Langlois, who was more than six feet in the air when she fell, complained of severe pain in her knees. She was rushed to the hospital for X-rays and required three stitches. She still performed on October 31 for her Week Five performance.
- In season six, Meagan Duhamel was injured while performing a twist with her partner Wojtek Wolski during practice for their week 3 routine. As she landed from the maneuver, Duhamel collided with Wolski and hit her nose on his shoulder, resulting in a suspected fracture of the nose. She was cleared to skate in week 3 of the competition.

=== Hockey players ===
- In season two, Georges Laraque was hit near the left eyebrow by his partner Anabelle Langlois' skate when they both fell while performing a lift during rehearsals one day before the season premiere. Laraque required twelve stitches but was fit to perform the next night.
- In season five, Bruno Gervais suffered a torn right bicep when performing a choreographic slide in practice. Despite a lack of practice throughout the week, he went onto perform Week 6 with partner Ekaterina Gordeeva, with coach Paul Martini adjusting the choreography of both routines.

== Television ratings ==
Season	Premiered			Ended			TV Season	Rank (Performance shows)	Viewers (in millions)	Rank (Results shows)	Viewers (in millions)
Season	Date	Preview Show Viewers (in millions)	Premiere Performance Viewers (in millions)	Date	Final Performance Viewers (in millions)	Finale Viewers (in millions)	TV Season	Rank (Performance shows)	Viewers (in millions)	Rank (Results shows)	Viewers (in millions)
1st	October 4, 2009	-	1.959	November 15–16, 2009	1.878	1.736	2009-10	#18	1.737	#28	1.270
2nd	September 26, 2010	1.511	1.662	November 21–22, 2010	1.505	1.333	2010-11	-	1.534	-	1.113
3rd	September 18, 2011	1.195	1.307	November 13–14, 2011	1.341	0.897	2011-12	-	1.147	-	0.823
4th	September 22, 2013	0.771	1.004	November 10–17, 2013	1.078	TBD	2013-14	TBA	TBA	-	-
5th	September 19, 2019	-	0.774	October 31, 2019	-	TBA	2019-20	TBA	TBA	-	-
6th	October 22, 2020	-	0.455	November 26, 2020	-	TBD	2020-21	TBD	TBD	-	-

== Awards and nominations ==
Year	Award	Category	Nominee(s)	Result	Notes
2010	Rose d'Or	Best Variety & Live Event Show	Season 1	Nominated	
2010	Gemini Awards	Best Music, Variety Program or Series	Season 1	Nominated	
2010	Gemini Awards	Best Direction in a Variety Program or Series	Joan Tosoni	Won	
2010	Gemini Awards	Best Photography in a Variety or Performing Arts Program or Series	Alex Nadon	Nominated	
2010	Gemini Awards	Best Performance or Host in a Variety Program or Series (Individual or Ensemble)	Kurt Browning	Nominated	
2011	Gemini Awards	Best Music, Variety Program or Series	Season 2	Won	
2011	Gemini Awards	Best Performance or Host in a Variety Program or Series (Individual or Ensemble)	Ron MacLean, Kurt Browning	Nominated	For Episode 2-15
2011	Gemini Awards	Best Performance or Host in a Variety Program or Series (Individual or Ensemble)	Shae-Lynn Bourne, Patrice Brisebois	Nominated	For Episode 2-09
2013	Canadian Screen Awards	Best Music, Variety, Sketch Comedy or Talk Program or Series	Season 3	Nominated	
2015	Canadian Screen Awards	Golden Screen Award for TV Reality Show	Season 4	Nominated	
