= Battle of the Blades season 6 =

Battle of the Blades
- Season 6
- Celebrity winner: Wojtek Wolski
- Professional winner: Meagan Duhamel
- No. of episodes: 6

Release
- Original network: CBC Television
- Original release: October 22 – November 26, 2020

Season chronology
- ← Previous; Season 5

The sixth season of Battle of the Blades premiered on October 22, 2020, on CBC Television featuring eight couples. The venue of this season was moved to CAA Centre in Brampton, Ontario.

== Production ==
Ron MacLean returns as host, with Canadian singer Keshia Chanté joining as the new co-host. Previous host and judge Kurt Browning is the "Elite Battle Expert" this season acting as a correspondent, and provides colour commentary throughout the series. The judging panel saw a complete overhaul this season, with the additions of Olympic ice dancing gold medalist Scott Moir, Olympic ice hockey gold medalist and season 5 runner-up Natalie Spooner, and Junior Canadian figure skating champion Elladj Baldé. For the first time in the series' history, a record three female ice hockey players and three male figure skaters, were cast as contestants this season, besting the number of two female ice hockey players in season 5.

Because of the ongoing COVID-19 pandemic in Canada, there is no live studio audience for the taping of the season. Instead, viewers were encouraged to sign up to become "virtual audience" members to attend the tapings of the series, and have a livestream video of themselves broadcast via screens placed in the audience sections of the arena, to the effect of having these viewers being in the actual audience inside the arena.

The season premiere date was originally scheduled for October 15, 2020. On October 7, 2020, all training and pre-production was halted, after a member of the production team was tested positive for COVID-19. The season premiere is then postponed and rescheduled for October 22, 2020.

== Ratings ==
The rescheduled season premiere on October 22, 2020 was broadcast up against the 2020 United States presidential debate between Donald Trump and Joe Biden. The debate brought in over 3 million viewers and was the top rated television program of the week. The Battle of the Blades premiere drew in 455,000 viewers. For the first time in the history of the series, the season premiere did not place in the Top 30 for the weekly most watched television programs in Canada.

== Couples ==
Hockey player	Team/s played	Professional Partner	Charities	Status
Anthony Stewart	Florida Panthers; Atlanta Thrashers; Carolina Hurricanes	Violetta Afanasieva	Canadian Tire Jumpstart Charities	Eliminated 1st on October 29, 2020
Meghan Agosta	Les Canadiennes de Montreal; Team Canada	Andrew Poje	BC Children's Hospital	Eliminated 2nd/3rd ^{[a]} on November 12, 2019
Jennifer Botterill	Toronto Aeros; Team Canada	Eric Radford	Canadian Cancer Society	Eliminated 2nd/3rd ^{[a]} on November 12, 2019
Bryan Bickell	Chicago Blackhawks; Carolina Hurricanes	Kaitlyn Weaver	The Bickell Foundation (in support of MS Society of Canada)	Eliminated 4th on November 19, 2020
Akim Aliu	Calgary Flames	Vanessa James	The Time to Dream Foundation	Eliminated 5th on November 26, 2020
Kris Versteeg	Chicago Blackhawks; Toronto Maple Leafs; Philadelphia Flyers; Florida Panthers; Carolina Hurricanes; Los Angeles Kings; Calgary Flames	Carlotta Edwards	Opokaa'sin Early Intervention Society (Versteeg); Big Brothers Big Sisters of Calgary and Area (Edwards)	Third Place on November 26, 2020
Jessica Campbell	Calgary Inferno	Asher Hill	Do It For Daron (Campbell); FreedomSchool Toronto (Hill)	2nd Place on November 26, 2020
Wojtek Wolski	Colorado Avalanche; Phoenix Coyotes; New York Rangers; Florida Panthers; Washington Capitals	Meagan Duhamel	The Hospital for Sick Children’s Patient Amenities Fund (Wolski); Sandra Schmirler Foundation (Duhamel)	Winners on November 26, 2020

== Scoring Chart ==
Red numbers indicate the couples with the lowest score for each week.
Green numbers indicate the couples with the highest score for each week.
indicates the couple(s) eliminated that week.
indicates the returning couple that finished in the bottom two (*bottom three in week 4) the previous week, but won the Skate-Off.
indicates the couples in the Skate-Off that were declared safe due to the Skate-Off finishing in a draw.
indicates the winning couple.
indicates the runner-up couple.
indicates the third-place couple.

Team	Place	1	2	3	4	5	6 (Part 1)	6 (Part 2)
Wojtek & Meagan	1	16.2	16.9	17.1	17.4	17.7	18.0	17.7
Jessica & Asher	2	16.4	16.4	17.0	17.6	17.7	17.7	17.5
Kris & Carlotta	3	15.5	16.4	16.6	17.3	17.8	17.6	
Akim & Vanessa	4	15.9	16.7	16.8	17.4	17.5	18.0	
Bryan & Kaitlyn	5	16.2	17.1	17.3	17.5	17.4		
Meghan & Andrew	6 (T)	15.7	16.7	16.6	17.0			
Jennifer & Eric	6 (T)	16.1	16.6	16.8	17.0			
Anthony & Violetta	8	15.8	16.3					

== Average chart ==
Rank by average	Place	Couple	Total	Number of skates	Average
1	1	Wojtek & Meagan	121.0	7	17.28
2	2	Jessica & Asher	120.3	7	17.19
3	5	Bryan & Kaitlyn	85.5	5	17.10
4	4	Akim & Vanessa	102.3	6	17.05
5	3	Kris & Carlotta	101.2	6	16.87
6	6 (T)	Jennifer & Eric	66.5	4	16.63
7	6 (T)	Meghan & Andrew	66.0	4	16.50
8	8	Anthony & Violetta	32.1	2	16.05

== Individual songs & scores ==
Individual judges scores in charts below (given in parentheses) are listed in this order from left to right unless specified: Natalie Spooner, Elladj Baldé, Scott Moir. The couples are listed in the running order of each episode.

=== Week 1 ===
Couple	Scores	Song
Bryan & Kaitlyn	16.2 (5.4, 5.4, 5.4)	"Knocking at the Door (Acoustic)" - Arkells
Anthony & Violetta	15.8 (5.3, 5.3, 5.2)	"Cheap Thrills" - Sia featuring Sean Paul
Meghan & Andrew	15.7 (5.3, 5.2, 5.2)	"Flying on My Own" - Céline Dion
Akim & Vanessa	15.9 (5.3, 5.3, 5.3)	"Nina Cried Power" - Hozier featuring Mavis Staples
Kris & Carlotta	15.5 (5.2, 5.2, 5.1)	"Castle on the Hill" - Ed Sheeran
Jessica & Asher	16.4 (5.5, 5.5, 5.4)	"Purple Hat" - Sofi Tukker
Jennifer & Eric	16.1 (5.3, 5.4, 5.4)	"Sparrow" - Emeli Sandé
Wojtek & Meagan	16.2 (5.5, 5.4, 5.3)	"Unstoppable" - The Score

=== Week 2 - Halloween ===
Couple	Scores	Song	Status
Jessica & Asher	16.4 (5.5, 5.5, 5.4)	“Every Breath You Take” - Chase Holfelder	Safe
Wojtek & Meagan	16.9 (5.6, 5.7, 5.6)	“Bad Things” - Jace Everett	Safe
Akim & Vanessa	16.7 (5.6, 5.6, 5.5)	“Silence” - Marshmello featuring Khalid	Safe
Jennifer & Eric	16.6 (5.5, 5.5, 5.6)	“Toxic” - District 78 featuring Cheesa	Safe
Bryan & Kaitlyn	17.1 (5.7, 5.7, 5.7)	“Kill of the Night” - Gin Wigmore	Safe
Kris & Carlotta	16.4 (5.5, 5.5, 5.4)	“Joke's on You” - Charlotte Lawrence	Safe
Skate Off
Anthony & Violetta	16.3 (5.4, 5.4, 5.5)	“You Send Me” - James Andrews	Lose - Eliminated
Meghan & Andrew	16.7 (5.6, 5.5, 5.6)	“Bury a Friend” - Billie Eilish	Win - Safe

=== Week 3 - Personal Motivation ===
Couple	Scores	Song	Status
Kris & Carlotta	16.6 (5.6, 5.5, 5.5)	“Little Cowboys” - Gord Bamford	Safe
Jessica & Asher	17.0 (5.7, 5.7, 5.6)	“I Lived” - OneRepublic	Safe
Meghan & Andrew	16.6 (5.6, 5.5, 5.5)	“Rise” - Katy Perry	Safe
Wojtek & Meagan	17.1 (5.7, 5.7, 5.7)	“Don't Give Up on Me” - Andy Grammer	Safe
Bryan & Kaitlyn	17.3 (5.7, 5.8, 5.8)	“To Build a Home” - Glenn & Ronan	Safe
Skate Off
Jennifer & Eric	16.8 (5.6, 5.6, 5.6)	“The Girl You Think I Am” - Carrie Underwood	Tie - Safe
Akim & Vanessa	16.8 (5.6, 5.7, 5.5)	“Freedom” - Kygo featuring Zak Abel	Tie - Safe

=== Week 4 - Canadian Music ===
Couple	Scores	Song	Status
Jessica & Asher	17.6 (5.9, 5.9, 5.8)	“Got Your Number” - Serena Ryder	Safe
Bryan & Kaitlyn	17.5 (5.8, 5.9, 5.8)	“Ball and Chain” - Crystal Shawanda	Safe
Kris & Carlotta	17.3 (5.8, 5.8, 5.7)	“Betterman” - Virginia to Vegas	Safe
Wojtek & Meagan	17.4 (5.8, 5.8, 5.8)	“Hometown Kids” - The Reklaws	Safe
Skate Off ^{[a]}
Meghan & Andrew	17.0 (5.7, 5.7, 5.6)	“Mine” - Felix Cartal & Sophie Simmons	Lose - Eliminated
Jennifer & Eric	17.0 (5.6, 5.7, 5.7)	“It was in Me” - Avril Lavigne	Lose - Eliminated
Akim & Vanessa	17.4 (5.8, 5.8, 5.8)	“Ruin” - Shawn Mendes	Win - Safe

=== Week 5 - A Night Out ===
Couple	Scores	Song	Status
Akim & Vanessa	17.5 (5.8, 5.9, 5.8)	“Twist & Turn” - Popcaan featuring Drake & PARTYNEXTDOOR	Safe
Jessica & Asher	17.7 (5.9, 5.9, 5.9)	“Honey, I'm Good.” - Andy Grammer	Safe
Kris & Carlotta	17.8 (6.0, 5.9, 5.9)	“Can't Help Myself” - Dean Brody & The Reklaws	Safe
Skate Off
Bryan & Kaitlyn	17.4 (5.8, 5.8, 5.8)	“Katchi” - Ofenbach vs Nick Waterhouse	Lose - Eliminated
Wojtek & Meagan	17.7 (5.9, 5.9, 5.9)	“Reset” - Rich Aucoin	Win - Safe

=== Week 6 - Finale ===
The judges' score from the performance this week combined with the viewer's voting from last week determined the 3rd and 4th placing couples. The top two couples then advance to the next round and reprised a skating performance from a previous week. The couple with the higher judges' score from the Reprise Skate wins the competition.

Couple	Scores	Song	Status
Akim & Vanessa	18.0 (6.0, 6.0, 6.0)	“Scared to Live” - The Weeknd	4th Place - Eliminated
Wojtek & Meagan	18.0 (6.0, 6.0, 6.0)	“What a Wonderful World” - Reuben and the Dark	Advanced to Top 2
Kris & Carlotta	17.6 (5.9, 5.9, 5.8)	“Good Things Fall Apart” - Illenium & Jon Bellion	3rd Place - Eliminated
Jessica & Asher	17.7 (5.9, 5.9, 5.9)	“You Can't Stop the Girl” - Bebe Rexha	Advanced to Top 2
Top 2 Reprise Skate
Wojtek & Meagan	17.7 (5.9, 5.9, 5.9)	“Reset” - Rich Aucoin (reprise of Week 5 Skate)	Winner
Jessica & Asher	17.5 (5.9, 5.8, 5.8)	"Purple Hat" - Sofi Tukker (reprise of Week 1 Skate)	2nd Place

== Notes ==
- a Due to the Skate-Off in Week 3 resulting in a scoring tie with no elimination, there was a double elimination in Week 4. The bottom three couples were in the Skate-Off with the lowest scoring two couples of the Skate-Off eliminated.
