= Craig Simpson =

Canadian ice hockey player (born 1967)

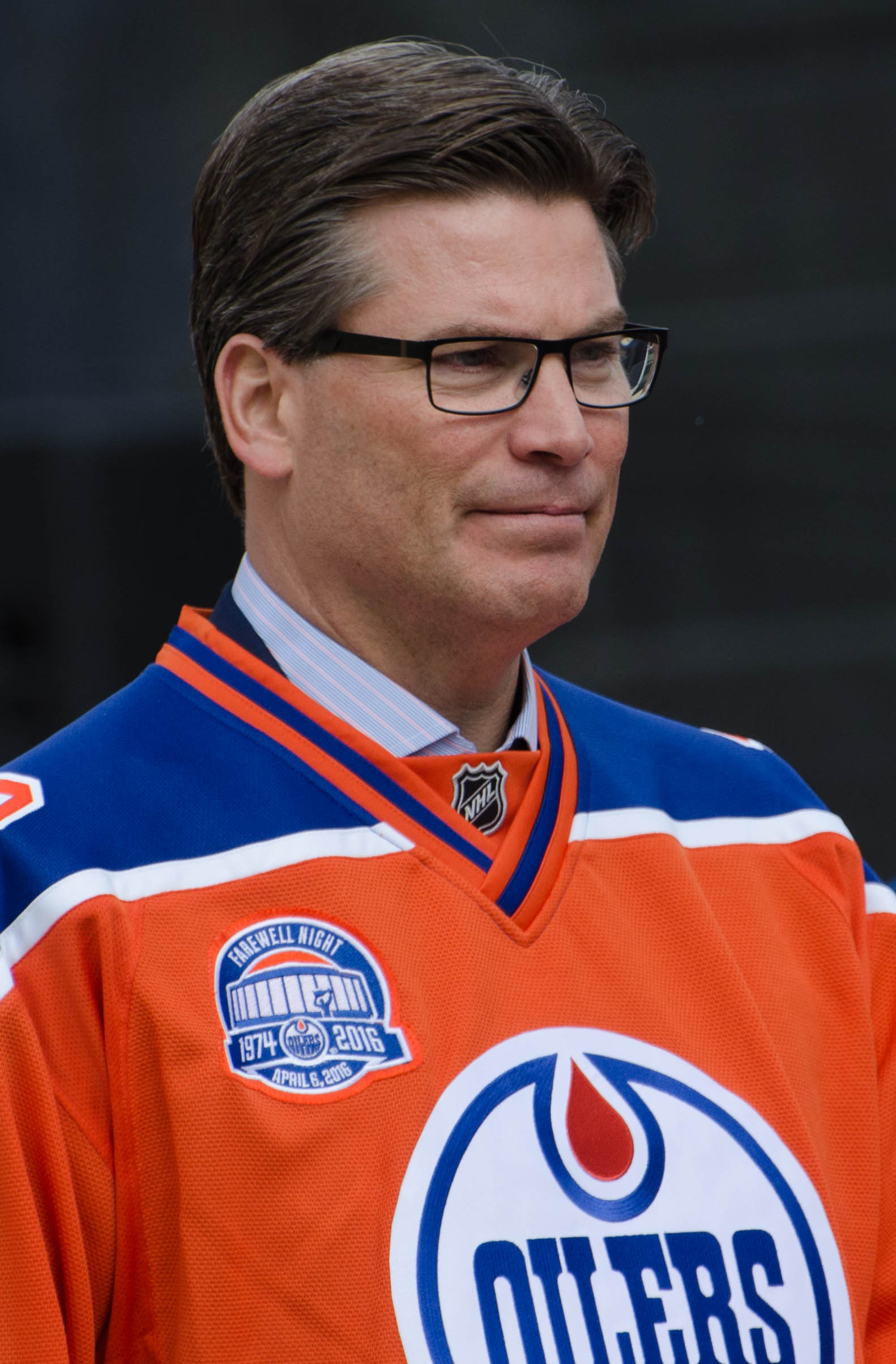
- Simpson in 2016
- Born: February 15, 1967 (age 59) London, Ontario, Canada
- Height: 6 ft 2 in (188 cm)
- Weight: 195 lb (88 kg; 13 st 13 lb)
- Position: Left wing
- Shot: Right
- Played for: Pittsburgh Penguins; Edmonton Oilers; Buffalo Sabres
- NHL draft: 2nd overall, 1985; Pittsburgh Penguins
- Playing career: 1985–1996

Craig Andrew Simpson (born February 15, 1967) is a Canadian former professional ice hockey winger who played 10 seasons in the National Hockey League for the Pittsburgh Penguins, Edmonton Oilers and the Buffalo Sabres. He is currently the lead colour commentator with Sportsnet for Hockey Night in Canada and Toronto Maple Leafs' Sportsnet regional broadcasts.

== Playing career ==
=== Amateur ===
As a youth, Simpson played in the 1979 Quebec International Pee-Wee Hockey Tournament with a minor ice hockey team from Oakridge Acres.

Simpson played collegiate hockey for the Michigan State Spartans of the NCAA from 1983–84 to 1984–85. Simpson skipped the third grade, then took his grade 11 and 12 course load simultaneously allowing him to start college at age 16. He became the first 16-year old to play Varsity hockey in the United States and led the team in scoring as a freshman. Then in his second year, his draft-eligible season, he exploded for 31 goals and 84 points in just 42 games. This performance made him the number one ranked prospect heading into the 1985 NHL Entry Draft according to Central Scouting.

The Toronto Maple Leafs held the first overall draft pick in the draft, but their pre-draft meeting with Simpson and his family did not go well. The Globe and Mail quoted Simpson discussing the meeting: "I had a lot of negative feelings about that first meeting and people told me a lot of negative things about Toronto so it was tough going." Ultimately the Leafs passed on Simpson and selected Wendel Clark with the first overall selection leaving Simpson available for the Penguins at number two.

=== Professional ===
==== Pittsburgh Penguins ====
Simpson was drafted in the first round, second overall, by the Pittsburgh Penguins in the 1985 NHL entry draft. As an 18-year-old rookie, he scored 11 goals playing right wing (shifting from his natural centre ice position) with veterans Doug Shedden and Terry Ruskowski. then more than doubled that total in his second year with 26 goals. His third season saw him slotted on a line with superstar Mario Lemieux and Simpson began to fill the net 13 goals and 26 points in his first 21 games to start the 1987–88 season before a blockbuster trade would take him off the wing of one of hockey's superstars and land on the wing with another. On November 24, 1987, Simpson, along with Dave Hannan, Chris Joseph and Moe Mantha were shipped to Edmonton in exchange for Paul Coffey, Wayne Van Dorp and Dave Hunter.

==== Edmonton Oilers ====
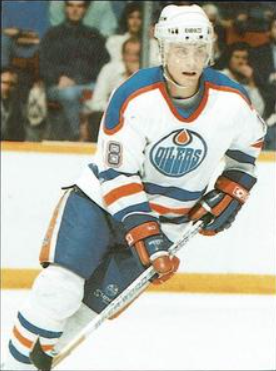
1988 card of Simpson in action for Edmonton Oilers

Simpson continued to blossom in Edmonton, shifting to the left wing and playing on a line with future Hall of Famers Mark Messier and Glenn Anderson. He scored a career-high 56 regular season goals (becoming the first player in NHL history to score 50 goals in a season split between two teams; Pittsburgh and Edmonton) during the 1987–88 season, and 13 more in the playoffs. His 13th and final goal of that postseason was set up by Wayne Gretzky and would prove to be the final point recorded by The Great One in an Oiler sweater. He won two Stanley Cups with the Oilers, in 1988 and 1990. In the spring of 1990, he led the playoffs with 16 goals (including the Cup-winning goal) in 22 games and tied with teammate Mark Messier for the points lead with 31. The Oilers had another playoff run in 1992, advancing to the Conference Final, but Simpson was sidelined in game one of the playoffs after a Larry Robinson check separated his shoulder. In 1992–93, he missed games with a strained back which was the beginning of back issues that would plague him the rest of his career. He was in and out of the Oilers lineup that year as the back issues would flare up and force him to the sidelines on multiple occasions before a protruding disc in his back ended his season.

==== San Jose Sharks offer sheet ====
That summer, Simpson became a free agent and turned down the Oilers offer of the same salary he had previously made. On July 16, 1993, the San Jose Sharks presented Simpson with an offer sheet which he accepted, joining the club as a free agent. However, the Oilers protested the deal that would see Simpson earn just $130,000 per season (the NHL minimum) while receiving a sizeable $1,790,000 "reporting bonus" for merely showing up at Sharks training camp. The unique structure of the deal would see the Oilers receive no compensation for losing Simpson. Upon further review, the league found that the Sharks offer was illegally structured and invalidated the contract. When rumours began to swirl that the Buffalo Sabres were also preparing an offer sheet for Simpson, the Oilers instead traded him there.

==== Buffalo Sabres ====
Simpson was traded to the Sabres in exchange for Jozef Cierny. In Buffalo, Simpson was slotted onto a line with Sabres stars Pat LaFontaine and Alexander Mogilny, and he found the back of the net in his first game with them, but it didn't take long for his back issues to flare up again. Simpson suffered a serious back injury in a game against the Tampa Bay Lightning on December 1, 1993. He returned on March 8 but re-aggravated the injury and missed the rest of the season and the playoffs. He was limited to just 22 games that year and the following year suited up for just 24 more before it became clear that the issues with his back would make playing at the NHL level impossible. "The last three years in the National Hockey League for me were probably as painful a hell as I've lived." At just age 28, he retired as a player with Buffalo buying out the final year of his contract. He finished with 497 career NHL points.

Arguably one of the most proficient snipers in NHL history, he holds the record for best career shooting percentage (minimum 800 shots) with 23.66%. He also holds the record for best career playoff shooting percentage (minimum 80 shots) with 33.65%, well ahead of second place Jake Guentzel. In his outstanding 1987–88 season, he posted a 32.26% shooting percentage to go along with his career-high 56 goals; Charlie Simmer is the only other player in NHL history to top 50 goals and a 30% shooting percentage in a single season.

== Broadcasting career ==
After retiring as a player, Simpson joined Fox television as a colour commentator. In 1998, Simpson joined CTV Sportsnet as a colour commentator for Edmonton Oilers regional games, as well as the network's weekly national broadcasts. He left in 2003 to become an assistant coach with the Oilers. After the 2006–07 season, he resigned from his position with the club to take a job as a colour commentator for CBC Television, alongside former Sportsnet partner Jim Hughson. Beginning in the 2008–09 season, the duo led the Hockey Night in Canada broadcast and called the NHL All-Star Game, the Winter Classic, the top Conference Final, and the Stanley Cup Final. When Rogers Media gained the NHL rights in 2014, the pair shifted to and re-joining Sportsnet, until Hughson retired from hockey broadcasting. Simpson is currently partnered with Chris Cuthbert, starting with the 2021–22 NHL season.

Simpson is also the former colour commentator for the EA Sports NHL franchise, along with play-by-play partner Hughson. He also appears in TV commercials and print ads for Carpet Superstores in Edmonton.

On March 22, 2008, Hughson and Simpson called the NHL game between the Edmonton Oilers and the Colorado Avalanche at 1 p.m. MDT. They boarded a chartered plane to Calgary, where the pair announced the third game of the Hockey Night in Canada triple-header between the Calgary Flames and the Minnesota Wild at 8 p.m. MDT. This is believed to be a first in the National Hockey League.

== Coaching career ==
Simpson joined his former team, the Edmonton Oilers, in 2005 and served as an assistant coach of the team. He helped lead the team to the Stanley Cup Final in the 2005–06 season.

== Battle of the Blades ==
In 2009, Simpson participated in the first season of CBC's Battle of the Blades, a made-for-TV figure-skating competition that paired eight former NHL stars with female figure skaters. Simpson and his partner, Jamie Salé, won the competition on November 16, 2009. On November 7, 2013, Simpson was inducted into the London (Ontario) Sports Hall of Fame.

== Personal life ==
Simpson is the son of Canadian Olympic athlete Marion Simpson. He is also the younger brother of former CHL Player of the Year Dave Simpson and younger brother of Rogers Sportsnet reporter Christine Simpson.

On June 21, 2012, Simpson married Canadian figure skater Jamie Salé, whom he had "known for years from the Edmonton skating scene". They had been paired as partners in late 2009 for the first season of the CBC show Battle of the Blades, which they won. Simpson and Salé have one daughter, born on July 7, 2013. Through this marriage, Simpson is also a stepfather to Salé's son Jesse Pelletier (born September 30, 2007), from her first marriage to skating partner David Pelletier. He also has three children from a previous marriage, including son Dillon, who was drafted by the Edmonton Oilers in the 4th round of the 2011 NHL entry draft and spent the majority of his professional career in the American Hockey League.

By July 2021, Simpson and Salé were no longer living together, and Salé filed for divorce in 2022.

== Awards and honours ==
Award	Year
All-CCHA First Team	1984–85
AHCA West First-Team All-American	1984–85
CCHA All-Tournament Team	1985
Stanley Cup champion	1988, 1990

== Career statistics ==
			Regular season					Playoffs
Season	Team	League	GP	G	A	Pts	PIM	GP	G	A	Pts	PIM
1981–82	London Diamonds	WOHL	41	23	22	45	36	—	—	—	—	—
1982–83	London Diamonds	WOHL	42	47	64	111	68	—	—	—	—	—
1983–84	Michigan State University	CCHA	43	14	43	57	38	—	—	—	—	—
1984–85	Michigan State University	CCHA	42	31	53	84	33	—	—	—	—	—
1985–86	Pittsburgh Penguins	NHL	76	11	17	28	49	—	—	—	—	—
1986–87	Pittsburgh Penguins	NHL	72	26	25	51	57	—	—	—	—	—
1987–88	Pittsburgh Penguins	NHL	21	13	13	26	34	—	—	—	—	—
1987–88	Edmonton Oilers	NHL	59	43	21	64	43	19	13	6	19	26
1988–89	Edmonton Oilers	NHL	66	35	41	76	80	7	2	0	2	10
1989–90	Edmonton Oilers	NHL	80	29	32	61	180	22	16	15	31	8
1990–91	Edmonton Oilers	NHL	75	30	27	57	66	18	5	11	16	12
1991–92	Edmonton Oilers	NHL	79	24	37	61	80	1	0	0	0	0
1992–93	Edmonton Oilers	NHL	60	24	22	46	36	—	—	—	—	—
1993–94	Buffalo Sabres	NHL	22	8	8	16	8	—	—	—	—	—
1994–95	Buffalo Sabres	NHL	24	4	7	11	26	—	—	—	—	—
NHL totals			634	247	250	497	659	67	36	32	68	56

Awards and achievements
Preceded by Roger Belanger	Pittsburgh Penguins first-round draft pick 1985	Succeeded by Zarley Zalapski
