= Todd Simpson =

Canadian ice hockey player (born 1973)

- Born: May 28, 1973 (age 52) North Vancouver, British Columbia, Canada
- Height: 6 ft 3 in (191 cm)
- Weight: 215 lb (98 kg; 15 st 5 lb)
- Position: Defence
- Shot: Left
- Played for: Calgary Flames; Florida Panthers; Phoenix Coyotes; Mighty Ducks of Anaheim; Ottawa Senators; Herning Blue Fox; Chicago Blackhawks; Montreal Canadiens; Hannover Scorpions
- NHL draft: Undrafted
- Playing career: 1994–2007

Todd William Simpson (born May 28, 1973) is a Canadian former ice hockey player who spent parts of 10 seasons in the National Hockey League. He is currently a real estate agent in Kelowna, British Columbia.

== Playing career ==
Simpson played at Brown University before switching to Canadian junior hockey with the Tri-City Americans and Saskatoon Blades of the Western Hockey League.

In 1994, he was signed by the Calgary Flames, for whom he would be a member until 1999.

In the season opener against the Vancouver Canucks, on October 5, 1996, Simpson pushed future Hall of Famer Pavel Bure into the boards head-first which gave Bure whiplash.

For the 1999–2000 NHL season, Simpson moved to the Florida Panthers and was traded the following season to the Phoenix Coyotes.

After being claimed in the waiver draft by the Mighty Ducks of Anaheim to start the 2003–04 NHL season, Simpson scored a career-high 4 goals, only to be traded to the Ottawa Senators.

Simpson played his first season overseas during the 2004–05 NHL lockout, winning the Danish league championship for Herning Blue Fox, with his teammate and younger brother Kent. He returned to the NHL to play with the Chicago Blackhawks and the Montreal Canadiens the following season.

During the 2006–07 season, Simpson played for the Hannover Scorpions of the Deutsche Eishockey Liga in Germany. During the playoffs, he received a 12-game suspension for abuse of an official. The New York Islanders attempted to bring him back to the NHL for a playoff push. However, the NHL upheld his DEL suspension, and Simpson would not play another professional game.

== Personal ==
In 2011, Simpson was the eighth hockey player cast for the third season of the Canadian TV show "Battle of the Blades." He was partnered with United States Olympian Marcy Hinzmann, but they were the first couple eliminated.

== Career statistics ==
			Regular season					Playoffs
Season	Team	League	GP	G	A	Pts	PIM	GP	G	A	Pts	PIM
1990–91	Fort Saskatchewan Traders	AJHL	8	1	2	3	16	—	—	—	—	—
1991–92	Brown University	ECAC	18	1	4	5	38	—	—	—	—	—
1992–93	Tri-City Americans	WHL	69	5	18	23	196	4	0	0	0	13
1993–94	Tri-City Americans	WHL	12	2	3	5	32	—	—	—	—	—
1993–94	Saskatoon Blades	WHL	51	7	19	26	175	16	1	5	6	42
1994–95	Saint John Flames	AHL	80	3	10	13	321	5	0	0	0	4
1995–96	Calgary Flames	NHL	6	0	0	0	32	—	—	—	—	—
1995–96	Saint John Flames	AHL	66	4	13	17	277	16	2	3	5	32
1996–97	Calgary Flames	NHL	82	1	13	14	208	—	—	—	—	—
1997–98	Calgary Flames	NHL	53	1	5	6	109	—	—	—	—	—
1998–99	Calgary Flames	NHL	73	2	8	10	151	—	—	—	—	—
1999–2000	Florida Panthers	NHL	82	1	6	7	202	4	0	0	0	4
2000–01	Florida Panthers	NHL	25	1	3	4	74	—	—	—	—	—
2000–01	Phoenix Coyotes	NHL	13	0	1	1	12	—	—	—	—	—
2001–02	Phoenix Coyotes	NHL	67	2	13	15	152	5	0	2	2	6
2002–03	Phoenix Coyotes	NHL	66	2	7	9	135	—	—	—	—	—
2003–04	Mighty Ducks of Anaheim	NHL	46	4	3	7	105	—	—	—	—	—
2003–04	Ottawa Senators	NHL	16	0	1	1	47	—	—	—	—	—
2004–05	Herning Blue Fox	DNK	7	2	3	5	35	16	3	5	8	82
2005–06	Chicago Blackhawks	NHL	45	0	3	3	116	—	—	—	—	—
2005–06	Montreal Canadiens	NHL	6	0	0	0	14	—	—	—	—	—
2006–07	Hannover Scorpions	DEL	45	1	9	10	174	6	0	0	0	49
NHL totals			580	14	63	77	1357	9	0	2	2	10

Sporting positions
Preceded by Theoren Fleury	Calgary Flames captain 1997–99	Succeeded by Steve Smith
