= Kent Simpson (ice hockey, born 1975) =

Canadian ice hockey player

- Born: July 20, 1975 (age 49); North Vancouver, British Columbia, Canada
- Height: 5 ft 10 in (178 cm)
- Weight: 175 lb (79 kg; 12 st 7 lb)
- Position: Left wing
- Shoots: Left
- Oddset Ligaen team Former teams: Rødovre Mighty Bulls; Johnstown Chiefs; Sheffield Steelers; Schwenninger Wild Wings; Renon Ritten; Herning Blue Fox
- National team: Canada
- NHL draft: Undrafted
- Playing career: 1998–present

Kent Andrew Simpson (born July 20, 1975) is a Canadian professional ice hockey winger and current broadcaster, who most recently played for Rødovre Mighty Bulls in the Danish Oddset Ligaen. Simpson currently serves as a hockey commentator for BBC during Winter Olympic ice hockey coverage.

He has previously played in the East Coast Hockey League (ECHL) in North America and also played in Europe in the British Ice Hockey Superleague (ISL), the German Deutsche Eishockey Liga (DEL) and the Italian Serie A. He also spent the 1999–2000 season with the touring Canadian national ice hockey team.

Simpson is the younger brother of former National Hockey League player Todd Simpson.

== Playing career ==
After finishing university, Simpson joined the Johnstown Chiefs in the ECHL for the 1998–99 season before spending a season touring with the Canadian national ice hockey team. Simpson then went to Europe where he joined the Sheffield Steelers in the British ISL for the 2000–01 season when he helped them to win a Grand Slam of all available trophies: the Benson & Hedges Cup, the Challenge Cup, the league championship and the playoffs. Simpson then played the 2001–02 season playing for Schwenninger Wild Wings in the DEL before returning to Sheffield for the 2002–03 season. During this second spell with Sheffield he helped them to win the Challenge Cup and the league championship.

In 2003–04, Simpson played for Renon Ritten in the Italian Serie A before he moved to Herning Blue Fox in the Danish Oddset Ligaen for the 2004–05 season. Next, Simpson returned to Sheffield, who were then playing in the Elite Ice Hockey League, for the 2005–06 season and for his third spell with them. Simpson then returned to Denmark to play for Rødovre Mighty Bulls for the 2006–07 season.

== Records ==
- Most assists (17) and points (26) for Sheffield Steelers in 2002–03.
- Most goals (26) and points (50 – jointly held) for Renon Ritten in 2003–04.

== Career statistics ==
			Regular season					Playoffs				
Season	Team	League	GP	G	A	Pts	PIM	GP	G	A	Pts	PIM
1994–95	University of Alberta	CIAU	24	6	5	11	18					
1995–96	University of Alberta	CIAU	39	10	16	26	20					
1996–97	University of Alberta	CIAU	47	14	20	34	6					
1997–98	University of Alberta	CIAU	43	13	27	40	67					
1998–99	Johnstown Chiefs	ECHL	55	6	21	27	56	--	--	--	--	--
2000–01	Sheffield Steelers	ISL	43	16	10	26	24	8	4	2	6	10
2001–02	Schwenninger Wild Wings	DEL	54	6	8	14	36	--	--	--	--	--
2002–03	Sheffield Steelers	ISL	32	9	17	26	28	17	4	8	12	9
2003–04	Renon Ritten	Serie A	41	26	24	50	36	3	2	1	3	0
2004–05	Herning Blue Fox	Oddset Ligaen	36	15	29	44	20	15	4	7	11	14
2005–06	Sheffield Steelers	EIHL	37	18	20	38	38	6	4	5	9	12
2006–07	Rødovre Mighty Bulls	Oddset Ligaen	25	7	11	18	20	4	0	3	3	14
Professional totals			323	103	140	243	258	53	18	26	44	59

== International play ==
Played for Canada in:

- 1999–2000 touring team

=== International statistics ===
Year	Team	Comp	GP	G	A	Pts	PIM
1999–2000	Canada	Int'l	54	14	16	30	23
