= The Men's Project =

Canadian counselling agency

The Men's Project is a counselling agency based in Ottawa, Ontario, Canada, whose prime mandate is sexual abuse recovery and other issues surrounding the mental health needs of men and their families. The keystone of the agency is its Men & Healing program, a series of group programs designed for men who are recovering from childhood sexual and/or physical abuse. Aside from its Men & Healing program, TMP offers a number of other services, including: anger management; a fathering program; a province-wide crisis line; and individual, family and couples counselling.

In 2007, The Men’s Project received the Ministry of Ontario Attorney General’s Award of Distinction for Service Innovation. It was the only community service granted official standing at the Cornwall Inquiry. As well, The Men’s Project service engagement model has been adopted by the American non-profit 1in6 as a basis for its cross-American training and professional education services.

In 2011, The Men's Project was unsuccessful in gaining core funding through the Ontario Ministry of Attorney General's heralded new province-wide network for male survivors of sexual abuse. This program will provide, for the first time in Canada, stable core funding to social service agencies from across Ontario to provide services for male survivors of sexual abuse through regional networks. The Men's Project was granted a single year direct service contract by the province for 2011-2012.

== Programs ==
The Men's Project also provides a variety of training programs to assist agencies, communities and government services in their ability to address the unique issues faced by men and their families, such as its Male Sexual Victimization & Trauma Recovery training program, which it has provided to organizations across North America. It also offers a series of counselling programs: Individual, couple and family; Anger Management Group; Emotional Intelligence Group; Fathering Group; Men & Healing Phase I; Men & Healing Phase II; Concurrent Disorders (with CMHA).
