= Colby Armstrong =

Canadian ice hockey player (born 1982)

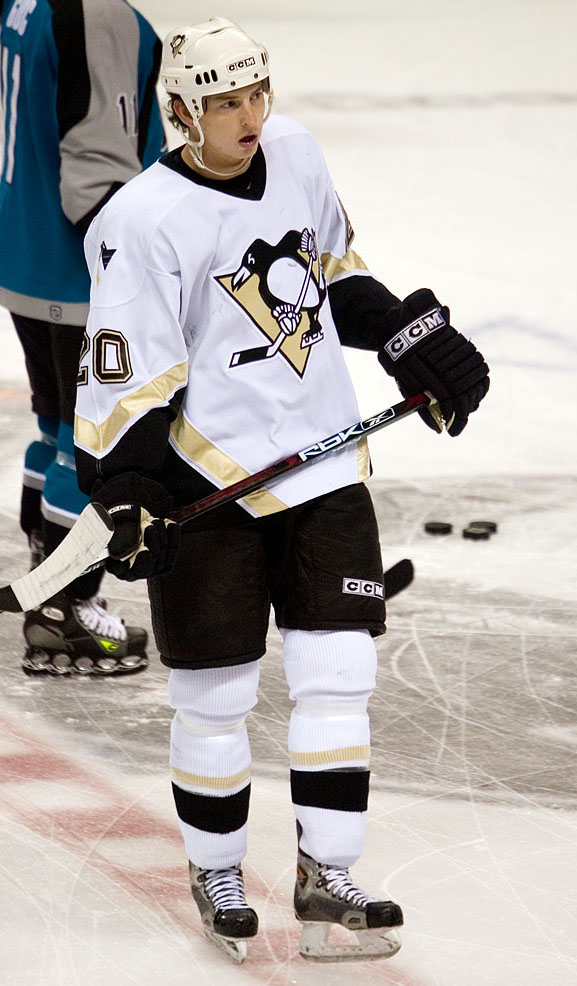
- Armstrong with Pittsburgh Penguins in 2006
- Born: November 23, 1982 (age 43) Lloydminster, Saskatchewan, Canada
- Height: 6 ft 3 in (191 cm)
- Weight: 195 lb (88 kg; 13 st 13 lb)
- Position: Right wing
- Shot: Right
- Played for: Pittsburgh Penguins; Atlanta Thrashers; Toronto Maple Leafs; Montreal Canadiens; Växjö Lakers HC
- National team: Canada
- NHL draft: 21st overall, 2001; Pittsburgh Penguins
- Playing career: 2004–2014

Colby Joseph Armstrong (born November 23, 1982) is a Canadian former professional ice hockey winger and current hockey broadcaster. He was selected in the first round, 21st overall, by the Pittsburgh Penguins in the 2001 NHL entry draft. Armstrong also previously played for the Atlanta Thrashers, Toronto Maple Leafs and Montreal Canadiens. He currently serves as an analyst for NHL on Sportsnet along with being an analyst for the Pittsburgh Penguins on SportsNet Pittsburgh.

== Early life ==
Armstrong was born in Lloydminster, Saskatchewan, but grew up in Saskatoon. His father worked for the City of Saskatoon and his mother operates a skating school in Saskatoon. He has an older sister, Tiffany, and a younger brother, Riley. He attended St. Joseph High School in Saskatoon.

== Hockey career ==
=== Junior hockey ===
Armstrong played his minor hockey with the Saskatoon Redwings and Saskatoon Blazers. He later played major junior hockey with the Red Deer Rebels of the Western Hockey League (WHL) beginning in 1999. In his second year with the Rebels, the team won the 2000–01 WHL championship. This allowed the Rebels to play for the Memorial Cup as the best junior hockey team in Canada. The tournament was held in Regina, Saskatchewan. The Rebels won the cup in overtime in the final with Armstrong as their captain. He played one more year with Rebels and finished his major junior career with 185 points in 205 games.

=== Professional hockey ===
Armstrong was drafted by the Pittsburgh Penguins in the first round of the 2001 NHL entry draft as the 21st pick overall. He was assigned to the Penguins' American Hockey League affiliate, Wilkes-Barre/Scranton Penguins beginning in the 2002–03 season. In the 2005–06 season, Armstrong made his NHL debut, and had a superb rookie season, in which he played 47 games and tallied 40 points (16 goals and 24 assists). Armstrong had three overtime goals for the Penguins in the 2006–07 season in which he accumulated 12 goals and 34 points. The Penguins and Armstrong avoided an arbitration hearing in the 2006–07 off-season by re-signing him to a two-year, $2.2 million contract. Armstrong became very close friends with teammate Sidney Crosby while playing for the Penguins. On January 1, 2008, Armstrong scored the first ever outdoor Winter Classic goal in the inaugural event.

Pittsburgh traded Armstrong on February 26, 2008, to the Atlanta Thrashers, alongside Angelo Esposito, Erik Christensen and a first-round draft pick in the 2008 NHL entry draft, in exchange for Marián Hossa and Pascal Dupuis. He then scored 11 points in 18 games to finish out the 2007–08 season with Atlanta. In the 2008–09 season, Armstrong played in all 82 games, matching his career high of 40 points. On July 16, 2009, Armstrong re-signed with the Thrashers to a one-year, $2.4 million contract. He served as one of the team's alternate captains during the 2009–10 season. He was also suspended for two games in April for an illegal hit on Mathieu Perreault of the Washington Capitals. He finished the season with 15 goals and 29 points in 79 games.

On July 1, 2010, Armstrong signed as an unrestricted free agent with the Toronto Maple Leafs on a three-year, $9 million contract. With his first two seasons largely affected by injury and inconsistent play, on June 30, 2012, he was bought-out by the Maple Leafs from his final season of his contract. He played in 79 games over the two years, registering 9 goals and 26 points. He was named an alternate captain by the Maple Leafs during his time with them.

With the opening of free agency the next day, July 1, 2012, Armstrong signed a one-year, $1 million contract with the Montreal Canadiens. During the lock-out-shortened 2012–13 season, he signed to play with the Utah Grizzlies, where his brother Riley was playing at the time. After the season resumed, Armstrong suffered another major injury in an April game versus the Carolina Hurricanes. He finished the season contributing only 5 points in 37 games.

On July 27, 2013, Armstrong left the NHL as a free agent and signed his only European contract with the Växjö Lakers of the Swedish Hockey League, playing one season.

== International play ==
Medal record

Representing Canada

Ice hockey

World Championships
Gold medal – first place	2007 Russia	
Silver medal – second place	2009 Switzerland	

Armstrong was a member of Canada's 2007 IIHF World Championship-winning team. His only goal of the tournament was the game-winning goal in the gold medal game against Finland in Moscow, which Canada won 4–2. He also played in the 2009 IIHF World Championship for Team Canada where they won the silver medal after losing to Russia 2–1 in the final.

== Broadcasting career ==
Rogers Media hired Armstrong as an analyst for Sportsnet's national coverage of the NHL starting in the 2014–15 season. Since 2016, he has also been an analyst of Pittsburgh Penguins games for the SportsNet Pittsburgh studio and game broadcast crew and games on TNT since 2022.

In 2019, Armstrong was in training to appear on the CBC reality TV show Battle of the Blades. However, he was injured during training and instead appeared on the show as one of the judges.

He currently appears on the Spittin' Chiclets spinoff podcast, Game Notes, on the Barstool Sports network, with former teammate Matt Murley.

== Personal life ==
Armstrong's younger brother Riley briefly played in the NHL with the San Jose Sharks.

== Career statistics ==
=== Regular season and playoffs ===
			Regular season					Playoffs
Season	Team	League	GP	G	A	Pts	PIM	GP	G	A	Pts	PIM
1998–99	Saskatoon Blazers AAA	SMHL	33	21	19	40	103	—	—	—	—	—
1998–99	Red Deer Rebels	WHL	1	0	1	1	0	—	—	—	—	—
1999–2000	Red Deer Rebels	WHL	68	13	25	38	122	2	0	1	1	11
2000–01	Red Deer Rebels	WHL	72	36	42	78	156	21	6	6	12	29
2001–02	Red Deer Rebels	WHL	64	27	41	68	115	23	6	10	16	22
2002–03	Wilkes–Barre/Scranton Penguins	AHL	73	7	11	18	76	3	0	0	0	4
2003–04	Wilkes–Barre/Scranton Penguins	AHL	67	10	17	27	71	24	3	1	4	45
2004–05	Wilkes–Barre/Scranton Penguins	AHL	80	18	37	55	89	10	4	2	6	14
2005–06	Pittsburgh Penguins	NHL	47	16	24	40	58	—	—	—	—	—
2005–06	Wilkes–Barre/Scranton Penguins	AHL	31	11	18	29	44	—	—	—	—	—
2006–07	Pittsburgh Penguins	NHL	80	12	22	34	67	5	0	1	1	11
2007–08	Pittsburgh Penguins	NHL	54	9	15	24	50	—	—	—	—	—
2007–08	Atlanta Thrashers	NHL	18	4	7	11	6	—	—	—	—	—
2008–09	Atlanta Thrashers	NHL	82	22	18	40	75	—	—	—	—	—
2009–10	Atlanta Thrashers	NHL	79	15	14	29	61	—	—	—	—	—
2010–11	Toronto Maple Leafs	NHL	50	8	15	23	61	—	—	—	—	—
2011–12	Toronto Maple Leafs	NHL	29	1	2	3	9	—	—	—	—	—
2012–13	Montreal Canadiens	NHL	37	2	3	5	12	4	0	0	0	15
2013–14	Växjö Lakers	SHL	37	12	7	19	26	10	0	1	1	20
AHL totals			251	46	83	129	280	37	7	4	11	22
NHL totals			476	89	120	209	376	9	0	1	1	26

=== International ===
Year	Team	Event	Result	GP	G	A	Pts	PIM
2007	Canada	WC	1st place, gold medalist(s)	9	1	1	2	4
2009	Canada	WC	2nd place, silver medalist(s)	9	0	3	3	4
Senior totals				18	1	4	5	8

Awards and achievements
Preceded by Brooks Orpik	Pittsburgh Penguins first-round draft pick 2001	Succeeded by Ryan Whitney
