= Canadian Breast Cancer Foundation =

Charitable organisation

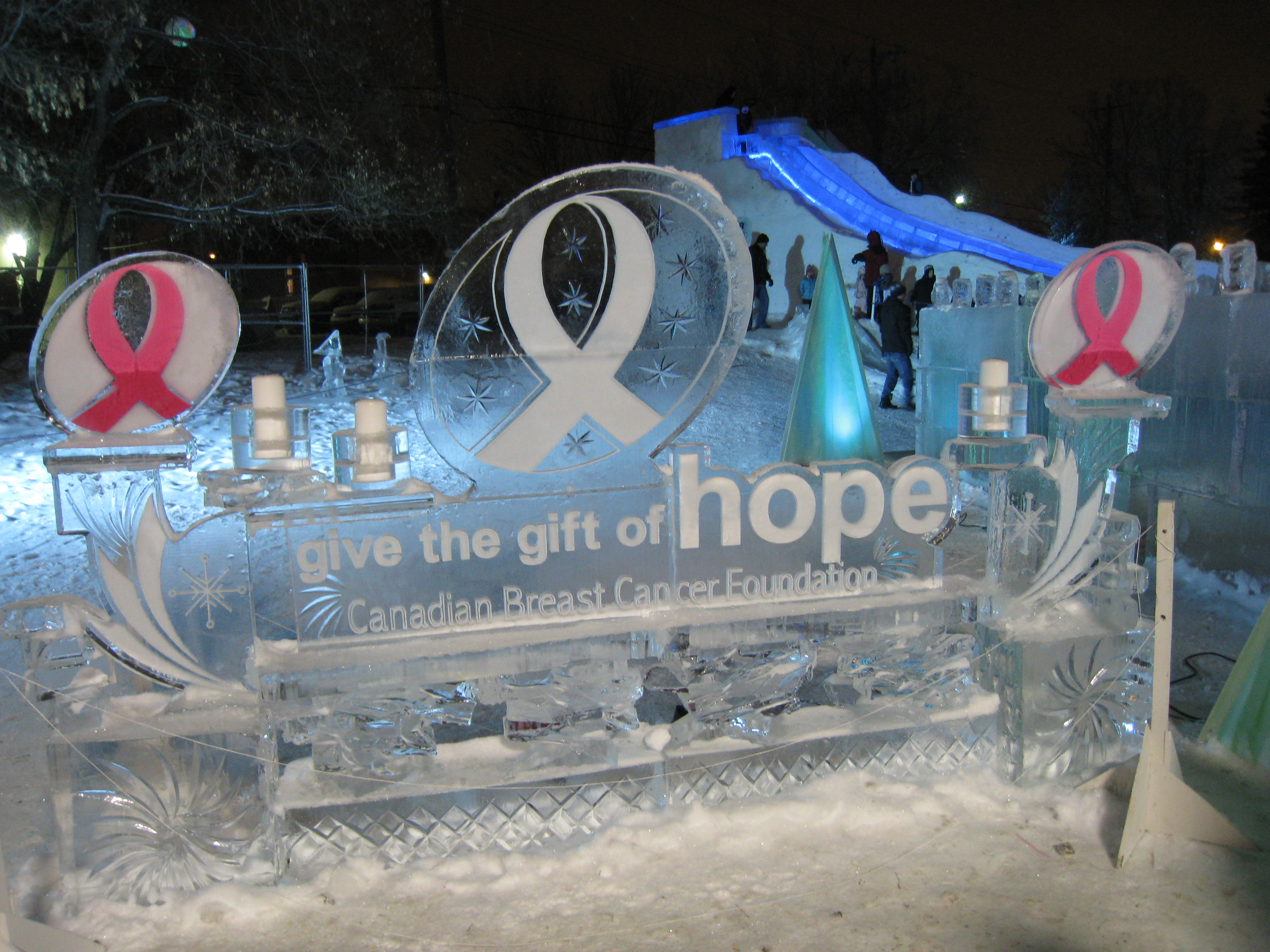
An ice sculpture at Ice on Whyte 2010 in Edmonton for the Canadian Breast Cancer Foundation

The Canadian Breast Cancer Foundation was a charitable organization which raised money to advance research, education, diagnosis and treatment of breast cancer. Established in 1986 by Nancy Tsai (then known as Nancy Paul), it worked to fund, support, and advocate for education and awareness programs, early diagnosis and treatment of breast cancer, and quality of life for those suffering from breast cancer. It is also part of a seven-member coalition which funds breast cancer research in Canada.

Addressing the needs of Canadians from coast to coast, the Canadian Breast Cancer Foundation has regional offices throughout Canada with the Foundation's central shared services office being located in Toronto.

The signature program for the foundation is the Canadian Breast Cancer Foundation CIBC Run For The Cure. The Run was created in 1992 by a small group of volunteers who wanted to raise awareness and funds for the cause. The first event took place in Toronto. Over 1,500 participants raised $85,000 that first year. Through the ongoing dedication of volunteers, this first Run has grown into Canada's largest single-day, volunteer-led fundraising event dedicated to breast cancer research, education and awareness. This program is now under the Canadian Cancer Society.

On February 1, 2017, the Canadian Breast Cancer Foundation merged its operations with the Canadian Cancer Society.
