= Sandra Bezic =

Canadian pair skater, figure skating choreographer and television commentator

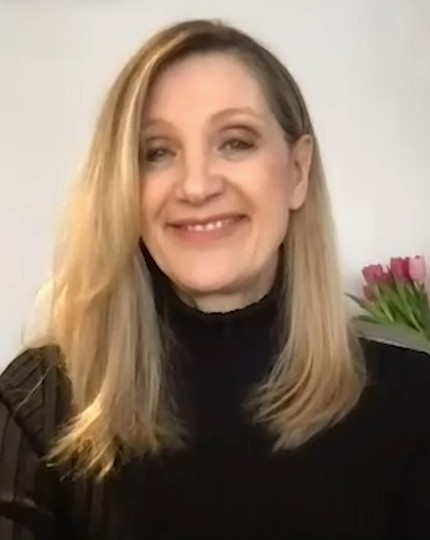
- Bezic in 2021

Personal information
- Full name: Sandra Marie Bezic
- Born: April 6, 1956 (age 70) Toronto, Ontario, Canada
- Height: 1.62 m (5 ft 4 in)

Figure skating career
- Country: Canada
- Skating club: TCS & CC
Medal record
Representing Canada
Pairs' Figure skating
North American Championships
Bronze medal – third place	1971 Peterborough	Pairs

Sandra Marie Bezic (born April 6, 1956) is a Canadian pair skater, figure skating choreographer, producer, and television commentator. With her brother Val Bezic, she won the Canadian Figure Skating Championships from 1970 to 1974 and placed ninth at the 1972 Winter Olympics. Skate Canada announced on July 14, 2010, that she will be inducted into the Skate Canada Hall of Fame in the professional category

== Early life ==
Bezic was born in Toronto, Ontario, on April 6, 1956. She is of Croatian descent. She is the younger sister of Val Bezic who was her skating partner.

== Skating career ==
Bezic competed in Canadian national competitions and international competitions from 1967 to 1975. She, with her brother, was a five-time national champion in pairs and came in fifth place at the 1974 Worlds Championships.

In 1975, during training for the 1976 Olympics, she tore her ankle ligaments and had to forgo the 1976 Olympics. She turned professional in 1976.

Bezic served as a commentator for NBC during the 2002, 2006, 2010, and 2014 Olympic games, the World Figure Skating Championships during the early 1990s, and numerous other skating events broadcast by NBC and CBC over the years.

For several years Bezic was the director, co-producer, and choreographer for Stars on Ice, for which she won an Emmy Award in 2003. She has also choreographed for several television figure skating specials including Canvas of Ice, Carmen on Ice, and You Must Remember This.

Bezic worked with several elite skaters as a choreographer, including Brian Boitano in 1988 and Kurt Browning in 1994. Figure skating historian James R. Hines called Browning's free skating program, which Bezic choreographed and Browning used at the 1994 Olympics in Lillehammer "one of figure skating's most memorable" programs.

Bezic is the author of The Passion to Skate (ISBN 1-57036-375-7), (ISBN 0-83626452-5). She also served as a judge on the CBC television program Battle of the Blades in each season.

She is credited as Marlon Brando's skating coach in The Freshman (1990) and appears with him in the skating rink scene.

=== As a choreographer ===
Bezic choreographed the competitive programs skated by many Olympic and World champions, including:

- (United States) Jeremy Abbott
- (United States) Brian Boitano (1988 Winter Olympics)
- (Canada) Kurt Browning (1993 Worlds)
- (China) Chen Lu
- (Spain) Javier Fernández
- (Russia) Ekaterina Gordeeva / Sergei Grinkov
- (Canada) Ava Kemp / Yohnatan Elizarov
- (South Korea) Kim Ye-lim
- (South Korea) Yuna Kim
- (Japan) Takahiko Kozuka
- (Canada) Kelly Ann Laurin / Loucas Éthier
- (United States) Tara Lipinski (1998 Winter Olympics)
- (Canada) Brooke McIntosh / Benjamin Mimar
- (Canada) Joannie Rochette
- (Estonia) Aleksandr Selevko
- (China) Shen Xue / Zhao Hongbo
- (United States) Lindsay Thorngren
- (United States) Jill Trenary
- (Canada) Barbara Underhill / Paul Martini (1984 Worlds)
- (United States) Kristi Yamaguchi (1992 Winter Olympics)

== Competition results ==
Pair skating with Val Bezic:

International
Event	68–69	69–70	70–71	71–72	72–73	73–74
Olympics				9th		
Worlds		14th	9th	8th	6th	5th
International St. Gervais			1st			
North American Champ.	5th		3rd			
National
Canadian Champ.	3rd	1st	1st	1st	1st	1st
Canadian Junior Champ.	2nd					

== Literature ==
- Eterovich, Adam S. Croatia at the Olympics, 1890s-1980s (!?!). // CROWN – Croatian World Network, [Bach, Nenad N. (ed.)], ISSN 1847-3911, 08/3/2004, Retrieved 2010-02-17
- Beisteiner, Johanna: Art music in figure skating, synchronized swimming and rhythmic gymnastics / Kunstmusik in Eiskunstlauf, Synchronschwimmen und rhythmischer Gymnastik. PhD thesis by Johanna Beisteiner, Vienna 2005, (German). The PhD thesis contains an extensive description and analysis of Carmen on Ice (Chapter II/2, pages 105–162). Article about the PhD thesis of Johanna Beisteiner in the catalogue of the Austrian Library Network. 2005. (German and English)
- "Skate Canada Results Book – Volume 1 – 1896 – 1973" (PDF). Archived from the original (PDF) on 2010-11-22.
- "Skate Canada Results Book: Canadian National Championships Medallists" (PDF). Archived from the original (PDF) on 2009-09-20.
