= CFCF =

CFCF may refer to:

- CFCF-DT, a television station (channel 12) licensed to Montreal, Quebec, Canada
- CINW, a radio station (940 AM) licensed to Montreal, Quebec, Canada, which held the call sign CFCF from 1920 to 1991
- CKBE-FM, a radio station (92.5 FM) licensed to Montreal, Quebec, Canada, which held the call sign CFCF-FM from 1947 to 1963
- CFCF (musician), a Canadian electronic musician
