= Mutsumi Takahashi =

Japanese-Canadian journalist

Mutsumi Takahashi CM
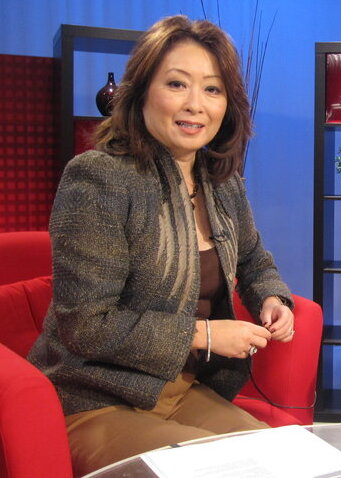
- Takahashi in 2010
- Born: Shiroishi, Japan
- Education: Vanier College; Concordia University, BA, psychology (1979), M.B.A, business administration (1995)
- Occupation: News presenter on CFCF-DT
- Spouse: Michel Cayer

Mutsumi Takahashi CM is a Japanese-Canadian journalist. Since 1986, she has been one of the lead news presenters of CFCF-DT in Montreal, Quebec.

== Early life and education ==
After emigrating to Canada in 1963 from Shiroishi, Japan by way of Boston, Takahashi grew up in the Montreal suburb of Côte Saint-Luc, Quebec. When she was six years old, she was studying piano at the Toronto Conservatory of Music. She graduated from West Hill High School in the Notre-Dame-de-Grâce neighbourhood of Montreal. After graduating from Vanier College in 1976, Takahashi graduated from Concordia University in 1979 with a BA degree in psychology. She later returned to Concordia to complete a Masters of Business Administration in 1995 as a mature student. In 2013 she received an Honorary Doctorate of Laws from her alma mater Concordia University.

== Career ==
=== Early career ===
While still a student, Takahashi’s first reporting experience came in the form of print media, radio, and television. She wrote for the Concordia University paper The Georgian, did radio for Concordia's station Radio Sir George, and hosted interviews for Concordia University TV (CUTV), ran by CFCF 12 (now known as CTV). She then replaced Mary-Lou Basaraba as host for the half-hour show called Our City, which aired Sunday mornings on channel 12 at 10:30 AM.

=== CTV News ===
Post grad, she became an intern at CKGM which led her to her first broadcasting job at CJFM radio doing newscasts and interviews. In 1982 she began her long running stint at CFCF Television as a reporter. Four years later she was promoted to co-anchor on Pulse (now known as CTV News) alongside veteran Bill Haugland until his retirement in 2006. She originally joined radio under the name of Lisa Takahashi and she also portrayed news presenters in some minor roles for made-for-TV movies.

Takahashi anchors CTV News Montreal at noon and weeknights. Takahashi frequently earned the accolade from the Montreal Mirror's Best of Montreal polls as "Best Local Newscaster" and continues to do so with Cult MTL's continuation of the Best of Montreal tradition.

Takahashi is a notoriously private woman whose longstanding motto is "It's about the news. It's not about me. And it never will be." She has no social media presence, and almost never grants interviews. One of the few times she granted an interview came in May 2017, ahead of being presented with a lifetime achievement award from RTDNA Canada.

=== Awards and honours ===
In 2017, she received the highest honour from her journalistic peers: the Lifetime Achievement Award by the Radio Television Digital News Association (RTDNA).

In 2017, she received a member statement in the Quebec National Assembly for her journalism and contributions to the community.

In 2018, she was named to the Order of Canada, the highest civilian honour in the country. She got this honour for her 30 plus years of broadcasting and support of charities within the community.

In relation to being a member of the Order of Canada, she was able to serve as a citizenship judge for newly appointed Canadians.

=== Activism ===
In the early 2000s/2010s, she was an honorary patron for the funding of the West Island Palliative Care Residence in Kirkland.

In 2009 Mutsumi Takahashi became a co-chair for The Best Care for Life Public Campaign for the Montreal University Health Center (MUHC). The goal of this campaign was to raise funds for the improvement of the MUHC's current and new sites.

She still currently sits on the McGill’s Beatty Memorial Fund Committee.

She is currently the Honorary Chair for The Campaign for Concordia. Her role is to bring awareness for Concordia University's goal to raise $250 million to upgrade and develop its educational facilities.

== Personal life ==
Takahashi is a Canadian citizen, and she is married to Michel Cayer.
