= CKBE-FM =

Rhythmic adult contemporary radio station in Montreal

Coordinates: 45°30′20″N 73°35′30″W

- Montreal, Quebec; Canada
- Broadcast area: Greater Montreal Area
- Frequency: 92.5 MHz (FM)
- Branding: The Beat 92.5

Programming
- Format: Rhythmic adult contemporary

Ownership
- Owner: Cogeco; (Cogeco Diffusion Acquisitions Inc.)
- Sister stations: CHMP-FM, CKAC, CKOI-FM, CFGL-FM

History
- First air date: 1947 (experimental as VE9CM 1945-1947)
- Former call signs: CFCF-FM (1947–1966); CFQR-FM (1966–2011)
- Former frequencies: 106.5 MHz (1947–1963)
- Call sign meaning: "Beat"

Technical information
- Class: C1
- ERP: 100,000 watts
- HAAT: 289.9 meters (951 ft)

Links
- Website: thebeat925.ca

CKBE-FM (92.5 MHz, The Beat 92.5) is an English language Canadian radio station located in Montreal, Quebec. It is owned and operated by Cogeco and airs a rhythmic adult contemporary format.

CKBE-FM has an effective radiated power (ERP) of 100,000 watts as a Class C1 station, using an omnidirectional antenna from a transmitter atop Mount Royal, at 289.9 meters in height above average terrain (HAAT). Its studios and offices are located at Place Bonaventure in downtown Montreal.

== History ==
=== Early years (1945–1992) ===
Q92 logo from 2004 to 2009

The station first signed on in 1945 as VE9CM, a 25-watt experimental FM station owned by the Canadian Marconi Company. It was the sister station to AM 600 CFCF (later CIQC and subsequently CINW on AM 940, before its 2010 closure). VE9CM simulcast nearly all of CFCF's programming. In 1947, Marconi gained a full licence on 106.5 FM with the call sign CFCF-FM. Its 3,000 watts transmitter was on the roof of the Sun Life Building. Its power was increased to 7,700 watts in 1957.

After changing frequency to 92.5 MHz in 1963, CFCF-FM was one of four FM stations using common transmitting facilities on the new Mount Royal tower. (The 106.5 frequency is now used by CFEI-FM in suburban Saint-Hyacinthe, Quebec.) The other stations on Mount Royal were CJMS-FM, CJFM-FM and CKGM-FM. In October 1966, the station changed call letters to CFQR-FM and adopted a beautiful music format. It kept this format for several decades, running advertisements on its co-owned television station CFCF-TV promoting itself as "CFQR 92.5, the sound you can almost see".

=== Q92 (1992–2009) ===
The 92.5 FM/600 AM pair underwent an ownership change in 1991. The station adopted the branding Q92.

Marc Denis joined on September 10, 2005, to host "Winning Weekends" on the station. Denis became the host, programmer and producer of "Saturday Night Oldies" on July 27, 2007. The program aired from 6 to 8pm prior to the Saturday Night Show Live From D'Aversa with Gordon Courtenay, a show also hosted briefly by Larry Day. Saturday Night Oldies aired its final show on January 1, 2009. By then, Denis was also the morning host at sister station CINW during its Oldies incarnation.

Gordon Courtenay died suddenly on October 29, 2005, only an hour before he was supposed to host his Saturday night show live from D'Aversa restaurant. The show had been running on Q92 for almost 30 years, since its start at the Montreal Airport Hilton in 1981.

In July 2006, Q92 launched its Summer Concert Series, drawing more than 300,000 for several outdoor concerts at the corner of Ste-Catherine and Peel.

On August 27, 2007, the station launched the Live Drive Show with hosts Ken Connors, Sonia Benezra, and Judy Croon.

In September 2008, Q92 stopped playing classic hits with sister station CINW changing to oldies in July 2008. The on air lineup was also changed, Q92 midday presenter David Tyler was replaced by Donna Saker. Terry DiMonte started a noon-hour show which originated from co-owned classic rock station Q107 in Calgary, Alberta. It was cancelled during the station rebranding as "92-5 The Q".

Morning host Aaron Rand played a featured role in YTV's Prank Patrol (a nationally distributed show aimed at children) debuting that show's 3rd season.

The annual one-day Corus Montreal Radiothon for Centre hospitalier universitaire Sainte-Justine, hosted by CFQR and its sister stations, raised more than $560,000 on November 16, 2007.

=== The Q (2009–2011) ===
On April 14, 2009, the station changed its identity to The Q 92.5 (pronounced ninety-two five), with a new logo and website.

On August 19, 2009, Tasso Patsikakis and Suzanne Desautels left the morning show and Aaron Rand remained as the presenter. Rand and Patsikakis had worked together for 23 years.

In November 2009, Murray Sheriffs was added as news announcer (replacing Barry Morgan) and Sarah Bartok was hired from Vancouver as traffic reporter. At the end of November, Chris Reiser, who had been the morning host of Krater 96 in Honolulu, Hawaii, was added to the mid-day line-up, replacing Tammy Moyer as she took a temporary personal leave. She was expected to return to work in the new year but Reiser later became the permanent host of the show. Tammy Moyer has since moved to CKWX in Vancouver, British Columbia.

In December 2009, a new two-hour weekend tabloid show was introduced, All Access Weekend with Anne-Marie Withenshaw, airing entertainment headlines and music news, on Saturday mornings, repeated on Sunday afternoons.

Beginning in 2010, host Leta Polson stopped doing her afternoon shift on the weekends but continued doing promotional remotes, commercials and other features for the station. The main weekday hosts (like Donna Saker, Ken Connors, Sarah Bartok, Chris Reiser) alternated for the Saturday shift. CJ Christin Jerome hosted Sundays in addition to acting as music director.

On April 30, 2010, Cogeco announced that it would acquire most radio stations owned by Corus Entertainment in Quebec.

In the summer of 2010, the station's main tagline became "More Music Variety" along with new jingles, retaining the catchphrase "The Q's just right for you!". The Q also began running 92 minutes of commercial-free music during the daytime, replacing 10-songs-in-a-row format introduced in April 2009.

In late July, "The Last Word with Maureen Holloway" was cancelled due to the station's pending sale from Corus to Cogeco, as Holloway works for Corus. The feature was replaced with "Startalk with Bartok", with Sarah Bartok.

On December 17, 2010, the CRTC approved the sale of most of Corus' radio stations in Quebec, including CFQR, to Cogeco. CFQR is Cogeco's first English-language radio station, as all of its other stations are francophone. The deal was finalized on February 1, 2011.

On May 26, 2011 (following his announcement in February), morning host Rand aired his final show on CFQR, and moved to host an afternoon talk show on 800 CJAD.

=== The Beat (2011–present) ===
On August 24, 2011, the station went jockless, and began airing liners promoting that "The Beat of Montreal is coming", along with a countdown clock on its website to 4 p.m. on September 6, which said underneath "You're Going To Feel It!"

At that time, CFQR flipped to rhythmic AC as 9-2-5 The Beat (the 9-2-5 pronounced as "9 to 5"). The last song on "The Q" was "Never Say Goodbye" by Bon Jovi, while the first song on "The Beat" was "Wanna Be Startin' Somethin'" by Michael Jackson. Shortly after the rebrand, the station changed its call letters to CKBE-FM. The station's playlist features upbeat rhythmic pop/dance currents mixed-in with hot AC fare, while the softer and older mainstream AC tracks were phased out along with the more mainstream hot AC fare, apparently to become more competitive and hit-driven with CJFM. CKBE's playlist direction is similar to New York City's WKTU, given Montreal's history of being a mecca for disco and dance music. In June 2013, CKBE-FM's ratings exceeded those of hot AC-formatted CJFM among overall listeners.

On November 29, 2013, the CRTC approved an application for the station to increase its power from 41,400 to 100,000 watts and its antenna height from 297.4 to 298.9 metres (976 to 981 ft) (HAAT).

In August 2014, Sam Zniber was named program director.

In November 2014, "All Access with Anne-Marie Withenshaw" was cancelled after five years. Withenshaw sued the station over alleged breach of contract.

In the March 2015 BBM ratings report, CKBE had a 19.9 per cent rating overall, more than five points higher than CJFM-FM. The Beat had the highest audience figures for the first time with listeners adults 25–54, females 25–54, males 25–54, adults 18-49 and adults 18–34. "The Beat Breakfast" also had the highest audience figures for morning show in female listeners 25–54, and the highest morning show figures among all English-language FM stations in Montreal.

=== Management ===
Ted Silver became program director (PD) of CFQR/CKBE in September 1992. He relaunched the station as "Lite Rock Q92". He left in April 2007. In May 2007, Chris Kennedy was appointed as Q92's program director. Kennedy left the station prior to Christmas 2008.

Brian DePoe became program director of CFQR and CINW in February 2009. DePoe had been operations manager and program director at CJEZ-FM in Toronto. He left in late 2010. Following the sale of Corus' Quebec radio stations to Cogeco Inc, Leo Da Estrela was named program director February 2011. He managed the rebrand from "Q" to "The Beat". In 2014, Sam Zniber was made program director.
