= Stevie-O =

- Genre: Children's television
- Presented by: Steve Woodman
- Country of origin: Canada
- Original language: English
- No. of seasons: 1

Production
- Producer: Larry Shapiro
- Production location: Montreal

Original release
- Network: CBC Television
- Release: 1 July – 21 September 1958

Stevie-O is a Canadian children's television series which aired on CBC Television in 1958.

== Premise ==
Steve Woodman of Steve's Place at Montreal's CFCF radio hosted this series. He provided the voice for various puppets and introduced animated shorts.

Woodman previously hosted the CBC Television series In the Story Book (1956–57).

== Scheduling ==
The 15-minute series was seen on Tuesday afternoons, beginning with its debut on 1 July 1958 at 4 pm. Successive episodes were broadcast at 5 pm until 21 September 1958, except for a 4 pm rescheduling on 22 July 1958 due to coverage of Princess Margaret's visit at Fort Langley.
