= Mitch Melnick =

Canadian sport radio broadcaster

- Born: June 14, 1959 (age 67); Montreal, Quebec, Canada
- Occupation: Sports radio personality

Mitch Melnick (born June 14, 1959) is a sport radio broadcaster in Montreal, Quebec, Canada.

A 45 year veteran of radio in Montreal, Melnick currently works for the English all sport station, TSN 690. He provides sport analysis every weekday from 2-6 as host of Melnick in the Afternoon. Melnick's show features regular segments with Pierre McGuire, Aaron Ward & Bill "The Spaceman" Lee.

Melnick previously spent seven years as host of The Melnick/No Limit Drive Home Show on CIQC, which, at that time, was the longest running show on English AM radio in Montreal. He eventually joined The Team (now TSN) in May 2001.

Melnick spent two years as an analyst in the Expos radio booth at The Team 990 alongside play by play man Elliott Price. The two had first worked together at CJAD in 1982.

The long time radio personality also worked in television as host of The Habs This Week and The Expos This Week. He later appeared as a regular on CFCF-TV's Sports Night 360 hosted by Ron Reusch.

Melnick is also well known by his passion for music. He is part of a music promotion company - Billy Bob Productions - that lured legendary music figures John Prine, Roger McGuinn, Richie Havens and Guy Clark to Montreal. He also produced the 40th Anniversary Celebration of The Last Waltz concert on November 25, 2016 at a sold out Corona Theatre in Montreal. Melnick's radio shows are sprinkled with music as a soundtrack.
