= Marc Denis (radio host) =

Canadian bilingual radio and television personality

- Born: February 19, 1953 (age 73); Hull (Gatineau), Quebec
- Other names: Mais Oui, Marc In The Dark, Marc Mais Oui Denis
- Occupations: Radio & Television Personality
- Years active: 1968–present
- Website: www.marcdenis.com

Marc Denis (born February 19, 1953) is a Canadian bilingual radio and television personality, known on the air as Mais Oui. Currently, he is the curator at the 98 CKGM Montreal Super 70s Tribute Pages and of the 1470 CFOX Montreal Radio Archive.

== Career ==
Marc Denis started his career as a radio host with college friends by founding the college radio station, CBRV, at Collège Bourget in Rigaud, Québec. His first commercial radio job was at CJRC Ottawa in 1970 where he was a Parliament Hill news reporter and later, on CKCH Hull, where he hosted radio programs while completing his graduation at the University of Ottawa.

His first broadcast on CKGM Montreal was in early 1974 where he initiated a bilingual English-French switch-hitting show in Top 40 format. A year later, bilingual colleagues Rob Christie and Scott Carpentier joined the station lineup and, together and back-to-back with Marc Denis, branded themselves as La Connection Française. The trio broke up in 1977 with the departures of Christie and Carpentier. Denis continued to host the evening show bilingually on CKGM until 1980. From 1980 to 2010, Marc Denis hosted programs on several other radio stations in Montreal, English (CJFM-FM) or French (CKOI-FM), and was also the producer-host of the bilingual in-flight audio pop music and interview program, Coffee, Tea or…Pop ! / Aéropop !, on Air Canada from 1989 to 1997.

He also hosted on-air in Toronto from 1997 to 2000, in English on CJEZ 97.3 and, in French, on CJBC 860 in 2001, before returning to resume his broadcast career in Montreal in 2002 with 105.7 Rythme-FM. Marc Denis joined Q92 on September 10, 2005 to host "Winning Weekends" and later, hosting the "New Saturday Night Oldies" as of July 21, 2007 on the station. On June 6, 2008, Q92's sister station CINW dropped its Talk programming for a "Greatest Hits of the 60s-70s80s" music format, with Marc Denis as the morning host, launching on July 1.

Marc Denis has also appeared on television as a host including, on Télé-Métropole CFTM 10 Montréal (TVA) and Télé-Québec in French, and, on CFCF-TV 12 (CTV Montreal) and CBC 6 Montreal in English during the 1980s. He was a regular host of Le Téléthon de la dystrophie musculaire televised across Québec, from 1981 to 1995.

In 2022 and 2023, Marc Denis wrote a memoir recounting his media career adventures and interactions with dozens of music and sports personalities over the decades, titled “Mais Oui Tell You Some Stories? A Radio Guy's Top 30 Career Recollections”. The book was self-published and released on March 24, 2023, simultaneously with the French-language version of the book which he also wrote, under the title of “On Jase, Mais Oui? 30 récits rocambolesques dans la carrière d'un radioman”.
