= Sam Zniber =

French radio executive (born 1969)

Sam Zniber (born 1969, Casablanca) is a French radio executive who has overseen programming at radio stations and radio networks in the USA, the UK, Canada, Australia, and France.

== Career ==
His career began at NRJ France in 1986, where he worked as producer, radio host, and production director for eleven years. In the 1990s, he became a TV host at France's main national television channels TF1 and France 2, presenting music shows.

In 1997, he joined RTL Group, a subsidiary of Bertelsmann, to become program director of Fun TV, a youth music cable television. In 1998, he was made program director of Fun Radio in France, and in 1999, introduced the "soul & dance" rhythmic contemporary hit radio format (CHR). In 2005, Zniber returned to RTL Group France as Group Program Director for Fun Radio and RTL2.

The UK’s Chrysalis Group recruited Zniber in 2001 as program director of the Galaxy radio network stations in Manchester and Newcastle (now Capital FM). In a few months, Galaxy went from third to first place in the ratings in Newcastle.

He worked for Clear Channel with Mix 106.5 in Sydney Australia between 2003 and 2005, creating a soft adult contemporary format called "Smooth Variety" and lifted the station's lead in market share for females 25-54 to 6% ahead of its closest competitor station. In 2004 he was a speaker at the National Association of Broadcasters' European conference, and at the Sciences Po University in Paris.

In 2007, Zniber operated as Vice President of Programming at Lagardere Group, overseeing the programming of twenty-three radio networks in seven countries in Europe and South Africa. In June 2008 he was appointed as director of the division of music stations Virgin Radio and RFM Lagardère Active. Following an audience decrease for Virgin Radio France from 5.9% to 4.7% between September and October 2009, he departed in November 2009.

He worked from 2010 as a programming and marketing consultant for radio stations and radio networks in Brazil, France, Spain and other countries as Vice President of Radio Intelligence, a research company for radio.

From 2012 he was program director at Magic 102.7 WMXJ-FM in Miami, Florida, where market share grew to 5.1% in December 2013 from 2.8% in April 2012 in the Arbitron PPM ratings.

In August 2014 Zniber was made program director at CKBE-FM ("The Beat 92.5 FM") in Montreal, Quebec, Canada. In March 2015 The Beat 92.5 had a 19.9 per cent rating overall, more than five points higher than Virgin Radio Montreal. The Beat had the highest audience figures for the first time with listeners adults 25-54, females 25-54, males 25-54, adults 18-49 and adults 18-34. "The Beat Breakfast" also had the highest audience figures for morning show in female listeners 25-54, and the highest morning show figures among all English-language FM stations in Montreal. Its morning show with Sarah Bartok and Cat Spencer, which was fourth in the market a year previously, was first in that age group, and had higher audience figures than CHOM-FM among men age 25 to 54.

In November 2016 RADIO INTELLIGENCE, involved in strategy and research for radio and music platforms has appointed SAM ZNIBER as Vice President and Strategic Consultant.

In November 2020 Sam Zniber has introduced MusicDatak, an algorithm-based music research tool specifically for radio stations, retail brands and music curators. MusicDatak automatically detects hits, verifies information, organizes and prioritizes hits according to the degree of audience satisfaction or fatigue in a precise location. It uses data sources from music platforms, radio airplay and social media music charts. The tool aims to help radio stations make better-informed decisions about their music categories in GSelector and MusicMaster scheduling systems.

Zniber completed executive courses at the Harvard Business School. and at UCLA.
