= P. J. Stock =

Canadian ice hockey player, broadcaster (b. 1975)

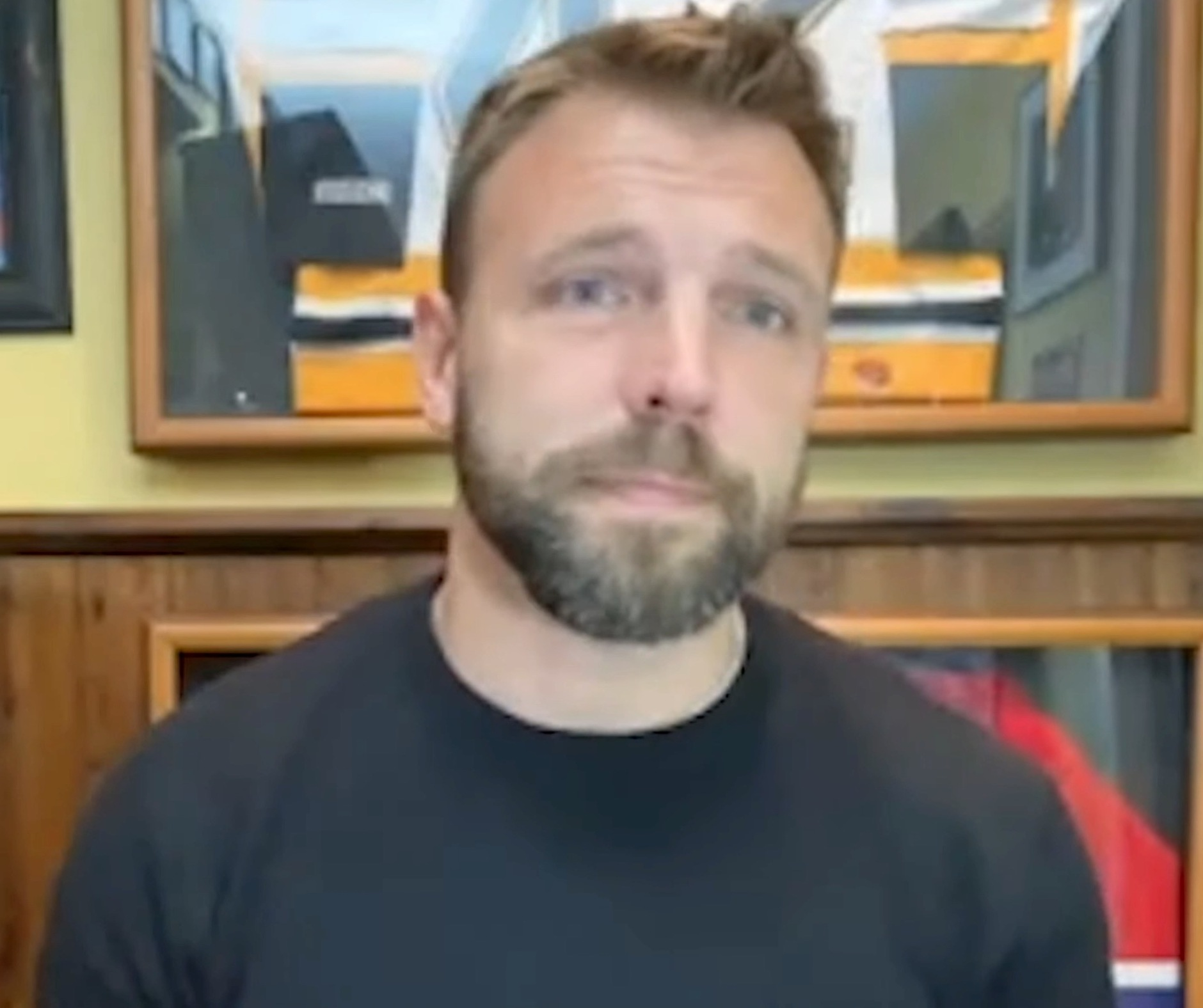
- Stock in 2021
- Born: May 26, 1975 (age 51) Dollard-des-Ormeaux, Quebec, Canada
- Height: 5 ft 10 in (178 cm)
- Weight: 190 lb (86 kg; 13 st 8 lb)
- Position: Left wing
- Shot: Left
- Played for: New York Rangers; Montreal Canadiens; Philadelphia Flyers; Boston Bruins
- NHL draft: Undrafted
- Playing career: 1997–2004

Philip Joseph Stock (born May 26, 1975) is a Canadian sports broadcaster and former professional ice hockey player. After retiring as a player in 2004, he hosted a radio show on Montreal station Team 990 and later became a regular member of the Hockey Night in Canada broadcast team until his release in 2016. Stock also occasionally participates as a panelist on the French language show L'antichambre, broadcast on the Quebec-based RDS sports channel. He is also an analyst for Boston Bruins pregame and postgame coverage on NESN.

== Playing career ==
Stock played two years with the Victoriaville Tigres of QMJHL, where he was briefly a junior teammate of Alexandre Daigle. Upon graduating junior, Stock entered St. Francis Xavier University in 1996. He was not drafted by an NHL team and signed as a free agent with the New York Rangers in 1997. Stock spent the next three seasons playing for both the Rangers and their AHL farm team, the Hartford Wolf Pack, and scored the Wolf Pack's first-ever goal on home ice at the Hartford Civic Center in 1997. Prior to 2000–01, Stock signed a free agent contract with the Montreal Canadiens. He played 20 games that year with the Canadiens before being traded to the Philadelphia Flyers for Gino Odjick. After a brief return to New York in the following offseason, Stock was claimed by the Boston Bruins in the annual waiver draft.

After two full seasons in Boston, Stock was briefly sent to their Providence farm team before being loaned to the Philadelphia Phantoms of the AHL. Stock totalled five goals, 26 points and 523 penalty minutes in 235 NHL games before being forced to retire due to an eye injury sustained during an AHL game between Springfield and Philadelphia. Stock was being loaned to the Philadelphia Phantoms at the time.

== Broadcasting career ==
Stock had his own show on Montreal radio called The Stock Exchange on Team 990. He presented sports on Montreal News at 6 on CBMT (CBC) television on a segment named Stock Talk. Being bilingual, he regularly appears in a francophone sports debate program on RDS, L'Antichambre. He was also a game and studio analyst for The NHL on OLN in its first season.

Stock debuted on CBC's Hockey Night in Canada in 2007 as a panel member for The Hot Stove segment hosted by Ron MacLean. For the 2008–09 season, he was reassigned to handle the scores and highlights. In 2010, he became an in-studio analyst on HNIC alongside Kelly Hrudey.

On December 18, 2009, Stock hosted "The Intermission with Tony Marinaro and The Stock Exchange" for the final time. On February 3, 2010, Stock joined the morning show team of Chantal Desjardins and Pete Marier on CHOM-FM in Montreal. Stock left the station a year later.

Stock was a participant in the second season of the CBC's reality competition, Battle of the Blades, partnered with Russian figure skater Violetta Afanasieva.

In 2012, Stock was featured along with Isabelle Brasseur in a TV advertisement by Depend, an incontinence product brand. With the help of these two athletes, Depend supports the Canadian Cancer Society for cancers below the waist and the BC Cancer Foundation's Underwear Affair.

When Rogers Media acquired the national NHL rights in November 2013, in which Sportsnet produces games airing on its Rogers-owned channels and CBC Television, Stock joined Sportsnet full-time. In June 2016, Rogers Media announced that Stock was cut from his position as a Hockey Night in Canada host, due to financial reasons.

For over 10 years, P.J. has been an analyst on RDS, Canada's leading French Canadian Sport network.

As of 2020, Stock is a producer on CBC's "Battle of the Blades" and the host of his podcast, "StockTalk".

== Personal life ==
Stock currently lives in Montreal with his wife Jean Marie and their four children. Stock is fluently bilingual in both English and French. He has a sister named Jill and a brother named Dean, who died from ALS in 2016.

== Career statistics ==
| | | | Regular season | | | | | Playoffs |
| Season | Team | League | GP | G | A | Pts | PIM | GP | G | A | Pts | PIM |
|---|---|---|---|---|---|---|---|---|---|---|---|---|
| 1992–93 | Pembroke Lumber Kings | CJHL | 55 | 10 | 38 | 48 | 189 | — | — | — | — | — |
| 1993–94 | Pembroke Lumber Kings | CJHL | 52 | 25 | 48 | 73 | 262 | — | — | — | — | — |
| 1994–95 | Victoriaville Tigres | QMJHL | 70 | 9 | 46 | 55 | 384 | 4 | 0 | 0 | 0 | 60 |
| 1995–96 | Victoriaville Tigres | QMJHL | 67 | 19 | 43 | 62 | 432 | 12 | 5 | 4 | 9 | 79 |
| 1996–97 | St. Francis Xavier University | AUAA | 27 | 11 | 20 | 31 | 110 | 3 | 0 | 4 | 4 | 14 |
| 1997–98 | Hartford Wolf Pack | AHL | 41 | 8 | 8 | 16 | 202 | 11 | 1 | 3 | 4 | 79 |
| 1997–98 | New York Rangers | NHL | 38 | 2 | 3 | 5 | 114 | — | — | — | — | — |
| 1998–99 | New York Rangers | NHL | 5 | 0 | 0 | 0 | 6 | — | — | — | — | — |
| 1998–99 | Hartford Wolf Pack | AHL | 55 | 4 | 14 | 18 | 250 | 6 | 0 | 1 | 1 | 35 |
| 1999–2000 | New York Rangers | NHL | 11 | 0 | 1 | 1 | 11 | — | — | — | — | — |
| 1999–00 | Hartford Wolf Pack | AHL | 64 | 13 | 23 | 36 | 290 | 23 | 1 | 11 | 12 | 69 |
| 2000–01 | Montreal Canadiens | NHL | 20 | 1 | 2 | 3 | 32 | — | — | — | — | — |
| 2000–01 | Philadelphia Phantoms | AHL | 9 | 1 | 2 | 3 | 27 | — | — | — | — | — |
| 2000–01 | Philadelphia Flyers | NHL | 31 | 1 | 3 | 4 | 78 | 2 | 0 | 0 | 0 | 0 |
| 2001–02 | Boston Bruins | NHL | 58 | 0 | 3 | 3 | 122 | 6 | 1 | 0 | 1 | 19 |
| 2002–03 | Boston Bruins | NHL | 71 | 1 | 9 | 10 | 160 | — | — | — | — | — |
| 2003–04 | Boston Bruins | NHL | 1 | 0 | 0 | 0 | 0 | — | — | — | — | — |
| 2003–04 | Providence Bruins | AHL | 4 | 1 | 0 | 1 | 2 | — | — | — | — | — |
| 2003–04 | Philadelphia Phantoms | AHL | 66 | 5 | 18 | 23 | 207 | 12 | 0 | 2 | 2 | 34 |
| AHL totals | | | 239 | 32 | 65 | 97 | 988 | 52 | 2 | 17 | 19 | 217 |
| NHL totals | | | 235 | 5 | 21 | 26 | 523 | 8 | 1 | 0 | 1 | 19 |
