= CITE-FM =

Radio station in Montreal

Coordinates: 45°30′20″N 73°35′30″W

- Montreal, Quebec; Canada
- Broadcast area: Greater Montreal
- Frequency: 107.3 MHz (HD Radio)
- Branding: 107,3 Rouge

Programming
- Language: French
- Format: Adult contemporary; HD2: CJAD (English Talk); HD3: CKGM (English Sports)
- Affiliations: Rouge FM

Ownership
- Owner: Bell Media; (Bell Media Radio)
- Sister stations: CFCF-DT, CHOM-FM, CJAD, CJFM-FM, CKGM, CKMF-FM, CFJP-DT

History
- First air date: May 7, 1977; 49 years ago
- Call sign meaning: "Cité", a French translation of "city" (acute accent is part of branding but not official calls)

Technical information
- Class: C1
- ERP: 42,900 watts
- HAAT: 297 metres (974 ft)

Links
- Webcast: Listen Live
- Website: rougefm.ca/montreal.html

CITE-FM (107.3 MHz) is a French-language radio station in Montreal, Quebec, Canada. Owned and operated by Bell Media, it airs an adult contemporary format. It is also the flagship station of the "Rouge FM" network, which operates across Quebec and in the Ottawa-Gatineau radio market. The studios and offices are located at the Bell Media building at 1717 Boulevard René-Lévesque East in Downtown Montreal.

CITE-FM has an effective radiated power (ERP) of 42,900 watts, using an omnidirectional antenna from the Mount Royal candelabra tower. It broadcasts in the HD Radio hybrid format, with its HD2 subchannel rebroadcasting 800 CJAD's talk format and its HD3 subchannel airing CKGM's sports format.

== History ==
=== Radio-Cité (1977–1990) ===
CITE-FM signed on the air on May 7, 1977 as a sister station to 730 CKAC, owned by Telemedia. While it was still being approved and built, the station was called CKAC-FM, though it would instead go on the air as CITE-FM. The previous year, a co-owned FM station in Sherbrooke at 102.7 began using the call letters CITE-FM. With the sign-on of 107.3 in Montreal, the Sherbrooke station became CITE-FM-1. That "-1" suffix usually indicates a full-time rebroadcaster of the non-numbered station, though CITE-FM-1 continued to have its own local personalities and advertising with a similar playlist. CITE-FM-1 is also easily heard in the eastern portion of the Montreal market, and Telemedia likely used the similar call letters for overall ratings purposes involving both stations. Currently, CITE-FM-1 simulcasts some programming from Montreal but retains its own local advertising and some local personalities.

Telemedia originally planned CITE-FM to be on 93.5 MHz, but the Canadian Radio-television and Telecommunications Commission instead arranged for CBM-FM to shift from 100.7 MHz to 93.5 MHz to accommodate CBF-FM. Telemedia then took the 107.3 allocation instead.

CITE-FM aired a beautiful music format as Radio-Cité. It played instrumental cover versions of popular songs, along with some French and English middle of the road (MOR) vocals. Over time, to attract younger listeners, the number of vocals increased while the instrumental music was scaled back.

=== RockDétente (1990–2011) ===
CITE-FM's last RockDétente-era logo; used from 2004 until August 2011

In 1990, CITE-FM completed its move from instrumental to vocal music, switching to a soft adult contemporary format. "Radio-Cité" was renamed Cité Rock-Détente. Telemedia's radio stations in Quebec and the Maritimes were purchased in 2002 by Astral Media. CITE-FM became the sister station of Astral's CKMF-FM. Because of federal competition laws, Astral Media was not permitted to keep 730 CKAC. Following the transaction, CITE-FM left the CKAC building that was on the corner of Sainte-Catherine Street and Peel Street, relocating to CKMF's building at the corner of René Lévesque Boulevard and Papineau Avenue.

In 2004, Astral revamped the Rock Détente network with a new logo. This resulted in Cité Rock-Détente being renamed as simply "107,3 RockDétente." The station no longer uses its call letters on the air, except when required by CRTC regulations.

=== Rouge FM (2011–present) ===
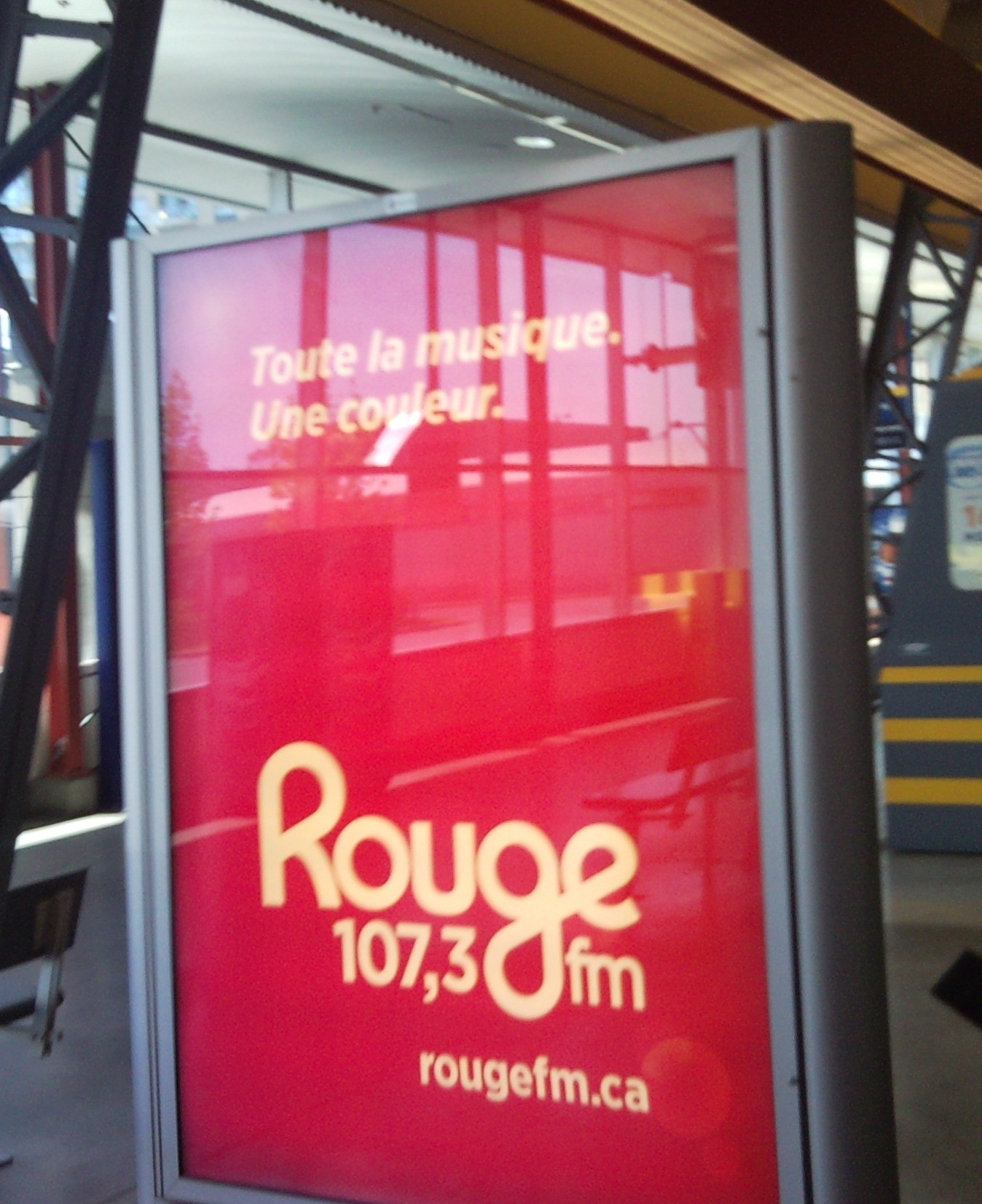
Radio station billboard.

On August 18, 2011, at 4:00 p.m. EDT, the station ended its 21-year run with the "RockDétente" branding. All "RockDétente" stations, including CITE, were rebranded as Rouge FM.

The last song under "RockDétente" was "Pour que tu m'aimes encore" by Celine Dion, followed by a tribute to RockDétente's 23-year history. The first song under "Rouge" was "I Gotta Feeling" by Black Eyed Peas.

== Transmitters ==
The following stations are known rebroadcasters of CITE-FM:

Rebroadcasters of CITE-FM
City of licence	Identifier	Frequency	RECNet	CRTC Decision
La Grande-1 generating station	CFAF-FM	106.1 FM	Query	2004-258
La Grande-3 generating station	CFBE-FM	99.5 FM	Query	2004-258
Guyer	CFCE-FM	98.5 FM	Query	2004-258
Keyano (Camp LG-4)	CFDE-FM	100.1 FM	Query	2004-258
Nikamo (Camp LA-1)	CFEB-FM	94.7 FM	Query	2004-258
Laforge-2 generating station	CFFA-FM	100.7 FM	Query	2004-258
Brisay generating station	CFGD-FM	94.9 FM	Query	2004-258
Radisson	CIGP-FM	92.3 FM	Query	
Champion	CIHA-FM	92.3 FM	Query	
Poste Laverendrye	VF2156	99.9 FM	Query	Public Notice CRTC 1998-39 #101
Parent	VF2239	92.1 FM	Query	93-671
Kattiniq	VF2348	88.5 FM	Query	2000-343
Kilometre 38	VF2403	98.5 FM	Query	2002-70

CITE-FM-1, a Rouge FM station in Sherbrooke, is not a rebroadcaster, but a separate station, despite the call sign suggesting otherwise. CITE-FM-2, also serving Sherbrooke, is a low-powered repeater of CITE-FM-1.
