= Debra Arbec =

Canadian journalist

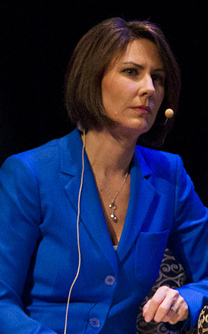
- Education: Concordia University
- Presenting career
- Network: CTV Montreal (1997-2011); CBC Montreal (2011-present)

Debra Arbec is a Canadian television journalist, who has been the lead anchor on CBMT-DT, the CBC Television station in Montreal, Quebec, since 2011. She is most noted as the winner of the Canadian Screen Award for Best Local Anchor at the 12th Canadian Screen Awards in 2024.

Arbec grew up in Rawdon, Quebec, and studied journalism at Concordia University. She began her career as a reporter for radio station CJAD, and briefly worked for The Weather Network before joining CFCF-DT in 1997 as a reporter and weekend and late-night anchor.

She moderated the English-language debate during the 2018 Quebec general election.

She was previously nominated for Canadian Screen Awards for best local news anchor at the 6th Canadian Screen Awards in 2018, the 7th Canadian Screen Awards in 2019, and the 8th Canadian Screen Awards in 2020. She was also nominated for a Canadian Screen Award for best News special at the 3rd Canadian Screen Awards in 2015 for the results of the 2014 Quebec general election.
