= Michael Libling =

Canadian author and former radio host

- Libling in 2026
- Born: Trenton, Ontario, Canada
- Occupations: Author; radio host; columnist
- Writing career
- Period: 2014–present
- Genres: Fantasy; horror; science fiction; mystery; thriller
- Notable work: Hollywood North: A Novel in Six Reels (2019)
- Website: www.michaellibling.com

Michael Libling is a Canadian author and former talk-radio host. He was a finalist for the World Fantasy Award in 2015 for his novella "Hollywood North", which he later expanded into his debut novel, Hollywood North: A Novel in Six Reels (2019).

== Life and career ==
Libling was born in Belleville, Ontario, and grew up in nearby Trenton, Ontario, the setting of his debut novel. He moved to Montreal at age 14. Libling created the Trivia Show on Montreal radio station CJAD, which first aired on January 11, 1981, with broadcaster Michael Kramer as his original co-host. Dave Fisher joined the station in 1984 and became his permanent co-host on Sunday mornings. During the same period, Libling worked as a copywriter for an advertising firm. He left radio in December 1999 to concentrate on writing fiction.

He lives in Dollard-des-Ormeaux, on Montreal's West Island.

== Writing ==
Libling's short fiction has been published in magazines such as Asimov Science Fiction and in collected anthologies including The Year's Best Fantasy & Horror.

His novella "Hollywood North", published in the November/December 2014 issue of The Magazine of Fantasy & Science Fiction, was a finalist for the 2015 World Fantasy Award in the short fiction category. He subsequently expanded the story into his debut novel, Hollywood North: A Novel in Six Reels, published by ChiZine Publications in 2019. In an interview with the Canadian literary site Open Book, Libling discussed the novel's themes of truth and guilt and his improvisational approach to plotting.

Set in the author's hometown of Trenton, Ontario, the coming-of-age mystery draws on the town's little-known silent-film history. Publishers Weekly called it an "assured, quietly menacing debut" that is "steeped in bittersweet childhood nostalgia and coming-of-age foibles", and a review in Locus by Paul Di Filippo described it as "an enthralling, nostalgically naturalistic, creepy and mordantly humorous tale". Reviewing it for the Montreal Times, Stuart Nulman compared Libling's treatment of Trenton to Stephen King's fictional Castle Rock, calling it "a gripping tale". The novel was also reviewed in the Montreal Review of Books.

His second novel, The Serial Killer's Son Takes a Wife, an off-kilter horror-thriller narrated by the son of a notorious serial killer, was published by WordFire Press in 2023. The book's release was covered in the Montreal weekly The Suburban, and Libling discussed it in an interview on the horror-themed program Darkness Radio.

== Bibliography ==
=== Novels ===
- Hollywood North: A Novel in Six Reels (ChiZine Publications, 2019) ISBN 978-1771484909
- The Serial Killer's Son Takes a Wife (WordFire Press, 2023) ISBN 978-1680574579

=== Selected short fiction ===
- "Hollywood North" (The Magazine of Fantasy & Science Fiction, November/December 2014) — World Fantasy Award finalist, 2015
- "Trial by Harry" (Asimov's Science Fiction, May/June 2025)
- "The Placemat at Baldy's Diner" (Asimov's Science Fiction, March/April 2026)

== Awards ==
- 2015 – World Fantasy Award, Short Fiction – finalist, for "Hollywood North"
