= Todd van der Heyden =

Canadian television reporter

Todd van der Heyden (born October 16, 1973) is a Canadian journalist and news anchor with CTV News in Toronto, Ontario, born in Montreal, Quebec.

== Education ==
Van der Heyden was born in Montreal, Quebec. He earned a bachelor's degree in journalism from Carleton University in Ottawa. In 2004, he received a graduate diploma in communication studies from Concordia University in Montreal.

== Personal life ==
Van der Heyden is a native of Montreal. As a child, his family moved around a lot. He has three older sisters, Karen, Wendy, and Cindy. He also has a half-sister, Melanie. His father was born in Eindhoven, in the Netherlands, but immigrated to Canada at an early age. His mother was born in Quebec, outside of Montreal.

His parents got divorced in 1993.

Todd is a massive fan of Elvis and has an extensive comic collection.

Although van der Heyden had referenced being gay on air at several points in his career on local television in Montreal, he came out definitively on national television as a member of the LGBT community during a live TV interview with Clay Aiken about the Orlando nightclub shooting on 14 June 2016. Van der Heyden has been an active member of the community for decades and has volunteered, donated to and spoken on behalf of several LGBTQ organizations over the years.

== Career ==
From 1997 to 2000, van der Heyden worked as a volunteer at Vidéotron's cable access channel Canal Vox, as well as freelanced at CBC Radio in Montreal and the Toronto Star newspaper. Starting in 2000, he worked as news reporter at CFCF which was later rebranded as CTV Montreal. In February 2005, van der Heyden became the co-anchor of the 6pm weekend newscast and later the noon weekday newscast. In July 2008, he also became co-anchor of the 6 o'clock newscast. On December 2, 2011 it was announced that van der Heyden would be leaving CTV Montreal for a promotion, joining CTV News Channel, the network's 24-hour cable news channel based in Toronto. He has been an afternoon news anchor at CTV News Channel since January 2012.

Van der Heyden is also the host of a weekly nationally syndicated radio show "Viewpoints with Todd van der Heyden" which airs on all Bell Media talk radio stations across Canada. The show initially launched in October 2011 on CJAD Radio in Montreal. The show is also available in podcast form across various platform such as iTunes, Spotify, Google Podcasts, iHeart Radio etc.

Van der Heyden also frequently acted as a fill-in anchor on CTV’s former morning show Canada AM and occasionally on CTV National News.

== Recognition ==
Van der Heyden has won three RTNDA awards (Radio and Television News Directors Association) and one CAB award.
