= DePoe =

DePoe is a surname. Notable people with the surname include:

- Brian DePoe, Canadian radio personality and program director
- David DePoe (born 1944), Canadian community activist and retired teacher
- Norman DePoe (1917–1980), Canadian journalist
- Peter DePoe (born 1943), American rock musician
