= CKGM =

Radio station in Montreal, Quebec, Canada

- Montreal, Quebec; Canada
- Broadcast area: Greater Montreal
- Frequency: 690 kHz
- Branding: TSN 690 Montreal

Programming
- Format: Sports
- Network: TSN Radio
- Affiliations: Montreal Canadiens Radio Network; Montreal Alouettes Radio Network; Montreal Alliance Radio Network; Laval Rocket Radio Network; CF Montréal Radio Network; Buffalo Bills Radio Network

Ownership
- Owner: Bell Media Radio programmed by TSN (Bell Media – 80%/ESPN; 20%); (Bell Media Canada Radio 2013 Partnership)
- Sister stations: CFCF-DT, CJAD, CJFM-FM, CHOM-FM, CITE-FM, CKMF-FM, CFJP-DT

History
- First air date: December 7, 1959
- Former call signs: CHTX (1989–1991); CKIS (1991–1996)
- Former frequencies: 980 kHz (1959–1990); 990 kHz (1990–2012)
- Call sign meaning: Greater Montreal

Technical information
- Class: A (Clear-channel)
- Power: 50,000 watts
- Transmitter coordinates: 45°17′43.08″N 73°43′18.12″W
- Repeater: 107.3 CITE-HD3

Links
- Webcast: Listen Live
- Website: iheartradio.ca/tsn/tsn-montreal

CKGM (TSN 690 Montreal) is an English-language AM radio station in Montreal, Quebec, owned by Bell Media Radio. Formerly an affiliate of sports radio network "The Team," it was one of three stations to retain the sports format after the network folded in 2002 until it switched to the TSN Radio branding in October 2011. CKGM has been an all-sports station since May 2001. Its studios and offices are located on René Lévesque Boulevard East in Downtown Montreal.

On September 4, 2012, CKGM officially began broadcasting on 690 kHz, as a non-directional clear-channel Class A station. It runs the maximum power permitted for Canadian AM stations, 50,000 watts. By day, CKGM can be heard from Ottawa to Sherbrooke and across the border into New York State and Vermont. At night, its signal covers much of Eastern North America. Its transmitter is located near Mercier. CKGM is also heard on the HD3 subchannel of CITE-FM. CKGM is carried nationally on Bell Satellite TV satellite channel 985.

While it was still broadcasting at 980 kHz, CKGM was known for being a legendary and influential Top 40/CHR radio station from 1970 to 1986. From 1941 until 1999, AM 690 in Montreal was the home of CBF, the flagship station of the CBC's French-language radio network, now known as Ici Radio-Canada Première.

== Current programming ==
CKGM airs local shows on weekdays, with TSN Radio programming heard evenings and weekends, and ESPN Radio programming late nights. Local shows include Melnick in the Afternoon with Mitch Melnick and Jon Still, Campbell vs Gallo with Sean Campbell and Mitch Gallo from 10am-2pm. The Morning Show with Conor McKenna and Shaun Starr, and The Starters with Simon Tsalikis & Joey Alfieri. These shows mainly focus on Montreal Canadiens analysis, especially during hockey season, but also address all the major sports in North America.

CKGM is the English-language flagship station for the Canadiens, with lengthy pre and post-game coverage for each game. TSN Radio 690 also carries network national feeds of the NFL and the World Junior Hockey Championships. CKGM, as part of the TSN Radio Network, also has rights for The British Open golf, U.S. Open Tennis, major world soccer championships, NBC Sunday Night Football and the Buffalo Bills Radio Network.

On June 22, 2011, Bell Media announced it had signed a deal with the Montreal Canadiens for CKGM to become the Canadiens' official English-language radio broadcaster for the next 7 seasons.

== Live sports ==
TSN Radio 690 is the flagship station for the following teams' radio broadcasts:

- Montreal Alouettes (CFL)
- Montreal Canadiens (NHL)
- CF Montréal (MLS)

== Notable staff ==
- Elliott Price
- Mitch Melnick
- Chris Nilan ("Knuckles" Nilan)
- Sergio Momesso

== History ==
=== Early days ===
CKGM was founded by Geoff Stirling and opened on December 7, 1959 with its downtown studio address at 1455 Drummond St. The station was then on 980 kHz with a power of 10,000 watts full-time as a class B station, using a directional antenna with different patterns day and night (the nighttime pattern being somewhat tighter). The 980 frequency had been previously occupied by CKVL, before it moved to 850. While most of the station's programming was devoted to music (playing Top 40 hits), the station also had a number of open-line talk shows. CKGM 980 was very well listened to in its heyday of Top 40 hits in the Northern Vermont and Northern New York areas due to their proximity to Montreal.

On July 16, 1963, an FM sister station, CKGM-FM, later known as CHOM-FM starting in 1970. After a few weeks of simulcasting CKGM, the FM station adopted a beautiful music format on September 1.

In 1963, a Molotov cocktail was thrown through a window, but was faulty and did not ignite inside the studios. Only three people were in the studios at the late night hour, including Jim Turner, on the air in the control room just a few metres away.

In 1965, CKGM hired open-line host Pat Burns, famous for his controversial opinions, especially on language issues. Known in particular for featuring prominently on his show Francophones who were proud of being bilingual or of being assimilated to the Anglophone community (again, depending on the point of view), Burns would remain on the air until early 1969, resigning after a boycott campaign targeting the station's advertisers was launched. Burns was sufficiently controversial to be publicly denounced by Quebec Premier Daniel Johnson Sr., and the station received several bomb threats during the late 1960s.

In 1968, CKGM moved from 1455 Drummond in downtown Montreal to 1310 Greene in Westmount.

CKGM became the Montreal Expos' flagship for the baseball team's first season in Montreal in 1969. (Baseball would move to CFCF the following year.)

=== Top 40 era ===
On January 1, 1970, CKGM changed its format to become a full-time Top 40 station. The ratings quickly climbed, with CKGM beating direct competitor CFOX, also a full-time Top 40 station, in the Fall 1970 BBM ratings. CKGM would quickly become one of North America's legendary AM Top 40 stations.

Legendary morning drive time host Ralph Lockwood, formerly of CFOX, made his debut on CKGM on October 2, 1972. He would remain with the station until late 1981.

In 1975, CKGM introduced "La Connection Française", referring to a trio of bilingual personalities (Rob Christie, Marc Denis and Scott Carpentier) which used both English and French on the air and played songs of both languages. As CKGM remained an English-language station, this resulted in French-language stations complaining to the Canadian Radio-television and Telecommunications Commission (CRTC) and even refusing to observe quotas of Francophone music. On-air bilingualism would remain a distinctive CKGM feature until stringent CRTC regulation forbidding it (and also enforcing quotas on the Francophone side) went into effect on January 1, 1980.

CKGM got a record-high number of listeners among English-language stations in Montreal according to the Fall 1976 BBM ratings that were released on December 13 of that year, thanks in part to the large numbers of Francophones who listened to the station. (Almost 40% of CKGM listeners were French-speaking.)

During its Top 40 era, CKGM was one of a handful of Canadian radio stations to carry the syndicated countdown show American Top 40 with Casey Kasem.

=== Sale to CHUM Limited ===
On August 20, 1985, CKGM and sister station CHOM-FM were sold to CHUM Limited. CKGM switched its format to gold-based adult contemporary under the "Lite Rock, Less Talk", and "Favourites of Yesterday and Today" monikers a few months later, on January 15, 1986.

The station returned to a Top 40 format at 5 p.m. on February 10, 1989, changing its call sign to CHTX in an attempt to distance itself as far as possible from its earlier days as a Top 40 station that even included adopting a new phone number. CHTX identified itself on-air as 980 Hits, and also referred to itself as "the station that plays the most music allowed by law" (in reference here to CRTC regulations that limited hit music on FM stations). Anecdotal evidence suggests that at least some listeners wondered if there was, in fact, a legal limitation on the number of songs radio stations can play.

On September 14, 1990, at 5 p.m., CHTX moved to 990 kHz, increasing its power to 50,000 watts full-time from a new transmitter site located in Ville Mercier, and converting itself to AM stereo. However, 990 was a class B frequency, requiring the station to use a directional antenna which is slightly directional during the day and extremely directional at night to protect clear channel (class A) stations CBW in Winnipeg, Manitoba and CBY in Corner Brook, Newfoundland and Labrador. The switch occurred one week later than initially scheduled, on orders from the federal Department of Communications, due to the "tense security situation" (the Oka Crisis) in the neighbouring Indian reserve of Kahnawake.

Another format change occurred at 6 a.m. on May 24, 1991, with the new format being oldies, although the station would also air Dr. Laura's syndicated advice show. The station changed its call sign to CKIS and identified itself as Oldies 990.

On January 15, 1996, the station returned to its original CKGM call sign, as the station moved to a talk radio format known as "Talk Radio With Attitude." The station aired mostly syndicated talk shows. For that reason, the station got low ratings, with fewer than 100,000 listeners. The CKIS call letters moved to a Calgary radio station formerly owned by Rawlco, and as of 2009, are now used on a Toronto radio station.

When the 1998 Ice Storm took place, CKGM continued to rely on automation, making few efforts to broadcast adapted emergency information. On January 9 of that year, competitor CJAD lost its broadcast towers due to the accumulation of ice. After that station moved temporarily to 1410 kHz using the former facilities of CFMB, CKGM leased its signal to CJAD on a temporary basis, starting on January 25, 1998. (Technically, CKGM left the airwaves and was replaced on 990 kHz by CJAD.) CJAD returned to 800 kHz on May 29, 1998, and after two weeks of simulcast, CKGM returned on June 12, 1998, at noon. The station took the opportunity to re-launch itself as a largely automated oldies station, again using the "Oldies 990" as its moniker (but keeping the CKGM call sign).

=== The Team 990 ===
Team 990 logo

In September 2000, shortly after the CRTC made changes to radio ownership regulations allowing a single company to own up to four stations in a market, CHUM announced it would trade CKGM and sister station CHOM-FM to Standard Broadcasting (which already owned two stations in Montreal) in exchange for CFWM-FM in Winnipeg (a market where CHUM already had two stations). This move allowed Standard to acquire Winnipeg's CKMM-FM and CFQX-FM.

However, a few months later, the CKGM portion of the deal was cancelled. The company immediately announced that CKGM would be added to the list of CHUM-owned AM stations switching to an all-sports format on May 7, 2001, joining the new "The Team" network and identifying itself as "Team 990". CKGM became the radio flagship of the Montreal Expos a few days later, marking a return of baseball on English-language airwaves. The station would broadcast the last Expos' games as a Montreal franchise in 2004.

Even in the very last days before the switch to the new format, the largely automated CKGM continued to air a promo criticizing "those talk stations" (in addition to always playing the same songs in the very same order).

While most Team stations returned to music programming (generally oldies) on August 27, 2002, CKGM was one of the few stations where the all-sports format survived, and locally produced programming was increased.

The Team 990 was anchored by the afternoon drive show hosted by Mitch Melnick. Its morning show featured veteran broadcaster Elliot Price and Shaun Starr (Denis Casavant left in November 2011 to pursue his career at RDS). Former NHLer PJ Stock hosted his own program daily from 1-3pm. Stock, from 2010–2011, was part of the morning show at CHOM.

Other popular programs included the Delmar Cargo Habs Post Game show, which came on after each Montreal Canadiens game.

In the summer of 2007, Matthew Ross, host of Game Points, set a station record by hosting a 10.5-hour marathon program.

=== Sale to CTVglobemedia ===
On June 22, 2007, CTVglobemedia purchased CKGM and most of the other assets of CHUM Limited following approval by the Canadian Radio-television and Telecommunications Commission, while the Citytv stations were sold to Rogers Communications.

=== CKGM files for frequency swap ===
On September 7, 2011, the CRTC announced the applicants for the 690 kHz frequency previously occupied by CINF—and before then, had been the longtime home of CBF. Among these included Bell Media, who planned on using 690 as a new frequency for CKGM. The reasoning for the swap was to take advantage of 690's around-the-clock clear-channel frequency, especially during nighttime hours when most sporting events, especially hockey, takes place; at 990, the station was forced to broadcast at a lower power at night, broadcasting directionally towards the north to protect CBW and CBY, significantly decreasing its coverage area in the suburban areas and on the South Shore. Other frequencies CKGM considered moving to was 940, though doing so would have taken six months to make the move, as opposed to three months if CKGM was awarded 690; and 600 (formerly used by CINW's predecessor, CIQC, before moving to 940 in 1999), but it would have required building new towers, and the only suitable site for broadcast was in Kahnawake, on land owned by competing broadcaster, Cogeco.

On November 21, 2011, CKGM's relocation to 690 was approved by the CRTC. The changeover took place on September 4, 2012, and its on-air branding was renamed TSN Radio 690. Following the switchover, CKGM began a 90-day simulcast period, as requested and approved by the CRTC. On the week of November 27, 2012, CKGM began running an announcement on a loop on 990, reminding listeners to tune to 690; the announcement also mentioned that CKGM would cease operations on 990 entirely on December 1, 2012. Sometime after this simulcast period had ended, the 990 frequency was transferred to Evanov Communications, who planned to launch its new LGBT-oriented station, CHRF ("Radio Fierté"), at 990 in early 2013. However, due to technical considerations, Evanov applied for, and was awarded, the 980 AM frequency instead (the frequency previously used by CKGM), with a launch date of 2014. Evanov originally applied for the new station to broadcast on 690.

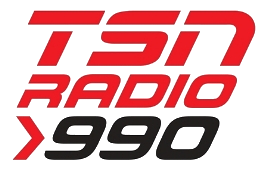
TSN Radio 990 logo, used from October 2011 to September 2012, when it moved to 690

=== TSN Radio ===
On October 3, 2011, Bell Media announced that the Team 990 would be relaunched (along with CFRW in Winnipeg) under the new TSN Radio banner, thus becoming known as TSN Radio 990 effective October 5, 2011. It was renamed TSN Radio 690 after CKGM moved its frequency to 690 in September 2012.

On March 16, 2012, Bell Media announced its intent to acquire Astral Media. Since Astral Media already owned the maximum of three English-language stations it could legally own in the Montreal market (as it had less than 8 English-language commercial stations), Bell was required to either divest stations, convert a station to a non-English language, or seek an exemption. In July 2012, Bell proposed the conversion of CKGM to a French-language sports talk format co-branded with TSN's French-language sister network Réseau des Sports (RDS). Bell also stated that the proposed format would supplant CKAC's recent switch from sports talk to traffic radio in 2011. On October 18, 2012, the CRTC rejected Bell's proposal to acquire Astral Media. Since the application to convert CKGM into a French station was contingent on the approval of the Astral merger, it too was rejected by the CRTC.

Prior to hearings in May 2013 regarding a modified proposal to acquire Astral Media, 15,000 listeners signed a petition issued by Bell in support of allowing the company to keep the station. Bell asserted that the CRTC could force CKGM to be sold or shut down if the company was not granted an exemption to the ownership cap. Bell proposed an exemption promising to keep CKGM as a sports radio station and invest $245,000 in local amateur sports and sports journalism scholarships for seven years. At the hearings however, the CRTC's commissioner noted that most of the comments on Bell's petition only supported CKGM maintaining a sports radio format and not Bell's purchase of Astral as a whole, and that the company could elect to sell a different station instead. Rogers Media showed interest in making a "reasonable offer" to purchase CKGM if Bell were forced to divest the station; Rogers planned to put the station in its Sportsnet Radio chain, maintaining a sports format and complementing the recently acquired City station CJNT-DT to increase its presence in Montreal. However, if this were to have occurred, CKGM would have lost its Canadiens radio rights because they are owned by Bell directly. The CRTC ultimately approved Bell's deal and its exemptions for CKGM.

After 45 years in the same building, CKGM relocated in September 2013 its studios to 1717 René-Lévesque Boulevard East to join the rest of the Bell Media cluster in Montreal.
