= Brian DePoe =

Brian DePoe is a Canadian radio executive. He has been a radio personality, program director, and sales manager.

His father is Norman DePoe, a Canadian broadcast journalist at the Canadian Broadcast Corporation until 1976.

== Biography ==
DePoe graduated from Northern Alberta Institute of Technology in 1983. He started his radio career at CJAX-FM in Edmonton, Alberta, before moving on to CKRY-FM in Calgary, Alberta. After a brief stint at CJJR-FM in Vancouver, British Columbia, DePoe became Afternoon Drive host and Program Director of CKWX Vancouver. He was Operations Manager and Program Director at 97.3 E-Z Rock, owned by Astral Media.

DePoe has been president of the British Columbia Country Music Association and a member of the board of directors for Canada's Factor Program He has also won the Program Director of the Year award at Canadian Music Week.

In addition, DePoe was Program Director of Corus Montreal's English-language station, CFQR . He held the same title at CINW , a second English-language station in Montreal, until it ceased operations on January 29, 2010.

DePoe has been General Sales Manager for Central Ontario Broadcasting since 2014.
