= CKMF-FM =

Radio station in Montreal

Coordinates: 45°30′20″N 73°35′30″W

- Montreal, Quebec; Canada
- Broadcast area: Greater Montreal
- Frequency: 94.3 MHz (FM)
- Branding: Énergie 94.3

Programming
- Language: French
- Format: Mainstream rock
- Network: Énergie

Ownership
- Owner: Bell Media; (Bell Media Radio)
- Sister stations: CFCF-DT; CHOM-FM; CITE-FM; CJAD; CJFM-FM; CKGM; CFJP-DT

History
- First air date: May 11, 1964
- Call sign meaning: "Modulation de Fréquence" (French for frequency modulation)

Technical information
- Class: C1
- ERP: 41,400 watts
- HAAT: 297.4 meters (976 ft)

Links
- Webcast: Listen live
- Website: www.radioenergie.ca/montreal.html

CKMF-FM (94.3 MHz) is a French-language Canadian radio station located in Montreal, Quebec, owned and operated by Bell Media. The station airs a mainstream rock format and is the flagship station of the "Énergie" network, which operates across Quebec. It offers personality DJs playing francophone and anglophone rock hits from the current charts to the 1980s.

CKMF-FM broadcasts with an effective radiated power (ERP) of 41,400 watts as a Class C1 station, using an omnidirectional antenna from the Mount Royal candelabra tower at 297.4 meters (976 ft) in height above average terrain (HAAT). Its studios and offices are located at the Bell Media Building at 1717 Rene-Levesque Boulevard East in Downtown Montreal.

== History ==
=== CJMS-FM (1964–1971) ===
The station signed on the air on May 11, 1964, as CJMS-FM. It was a sister station to the now-defunct CJMS (1280 AM). Both stations were owned by the Radiomutuel Group. After first simulcasting the AM station, CJMS-FM later aired a classical music format. Classical music ended in 1970, changing to an automated Top 40/CHR format.

=== Early CKMF years (1971–1994) ===
The call sign was changed to CKMF-FM on May 1, 1971. The station moved in 1972 from its original facility at 1700 Berri Street in the Quartier Latin to 225 Roy Street East in the Plateau. It relocated for a final time in 1981 to its current building at 1717 Rene-Levesque Boulevard East (then named Dorchester Boulevard). Its sister station CJMS also moved to the Dorchester/Rene-Levesque building. The move reunited the two radio stations in the same facility for the first time in a decade as CJMS had never relocated to Roy Street in the 1970s and had instead stayed on Berri ever since.

In November 1978, the station became Canada's first radio station with a disco music dedicated segment, heard most evenings (although Broadcasting Yearbook listed the station's full-time format as Disco). Because of Canadian Radio-television and Telecommunications Commission (CRTC) rules and the fact that CKMF is a French-language station, it was required to play mostly French-language songs. Therefore, English songs (mostly the disco tracks) were spread thinly across the broadcast schedule. The DJ who spun disco music for the first time on Montreal FM Radio was Robert (Bob) Ostiguy during his Saturday night dance show Style Libre (Free Style), heard from 1974 to 1976.

Later on, Michel Trahan began to include disco music during his afternoon drive time show. "Le 5 à 8" became CKMF's most popular show between 1978 and 1986. CKMF concentrated its CRTC quota of English and International music (mostly disco) between the hours of 5-8PM. "Le 5 à 8" was hosted by Michel Jasmin and Alain Tanguay, and later by Alain Montpetit and Guy Aubry. The show featured the best disco DJs in Montreal including François L'Herbier, Alain Bourque, Big Dan Moreau and Michel Cadoch, doing shows like "Live from the Limelight" and other famous clubs in Montreal. Programs like "Le Show A Mario," with Mario Lirette and DJ Michel Cadoch, gave CKMF a unique sound for the Disco era. One of the station's biggest on-air personalities of the disco era was the openly gay Douglas Coco Leopold, whose trademark was his local trendsetting lists of who and what was "in" and "out" of fashion.

As was fictionalised in the 2010 Canadian film Funkytown, Montpetit's popularity as an influential DJ and promoter was tarnished by being named as the prime suspect in the 1982 murder of a model in New York City (which would not be confirmed until 2002), and would prompt Leopold to criticize fellow air staffer Montpetit on air publicly. In 1987, Montpetit died of a drug overdose in Washington, DC, just months after station management fired him after he showed up drunk and appeared too incoherent to do his shift live on the air.

=== Radio Énergie and the Astral Takeover (1994–2009) ===
Last CKMF logo using the Énergie branding before conversion to NRJ.

The Énergie name began to be used as CKMF transitioned from Rhythmic Top 40 in the 1980s and 1990s, to mainstream Top 40, which began in 1994. In January 2000, Astral Media acquired the assets of Radiomutuel including CKMF.

When fourth-adjacent 95.1 CBF-FM increased its power to 100,000 watts (from 17,030 watts), CKMF planned its own a power increase to 75,000 watts. But the boost in power never took place as the expected interference from CBF-FM did not happen. However this plan was notified internationally, which explains why the United States Federal Communications Commission's FM Query webpage erroneous claims that CKMF-FM has a power of 75,000 watts.

=== From Énergie to NRJ and back again (2009–present) ===
CKMF logo as NRJ.

The Énergie branding was discarded in August 2009 when Astral Media licensed the NRJ branding from a European broadcaster. CKMF's last song as "Énergie" was Pictures Of You by The Last Goodnight, segueing to the station's morning show as the station relaunched as "NRJ." The first song under the "NRJ" moniker was Beggin' by Madcon.

In 2010, the station became the French-language radio flagship of the Montreal Alouettes CFL football team. The contract was supposed to last until 2013. Both parties were apparently satisfied at the end of the 2010 season, but the contract was terminated as the Alouettes returned to 730 CKAC in time for the 2011 season.

With the merger of Astral and Bell Media on July 5, 2013, CKMF, as well as all "NRJ" stations in Quebec, came under Bell Media ownership.

By 2011, CKMF began moving away from Top 40/CHR to Adult Top 40 with an emphasis on modern adult contemporary material, which would later evolve into a straight-ahead modern rock presentation by late 2014.

Due to its high cost, Bell Media didn't renew the "NRJ" branding, and on August 24, 2015, all Quebec "NRJ" stations were rebranded back to the "Énergie" moniker, including CKMF. However, CKMF continued the modern rock format, whereas the other "Énergie" stations remained Adult Top 40.

In March 2016, CKMF shifted to hot adult contemporary, while retaining the "Énergie" branding, putting it in line with the "Énergie" stations in other parts of Quebec. By 2020, the "Énergie" stations, including CKMF, moved from hot AC to mainstream rock, stressing English and French language rock hits of the 1980s, 1990s and 2000s.

CKMF programming is simulcast on all "Énergie" stations around Quebec in the evening, overnights and weekend mornings.
