= Anne-Marie Withenshaw =

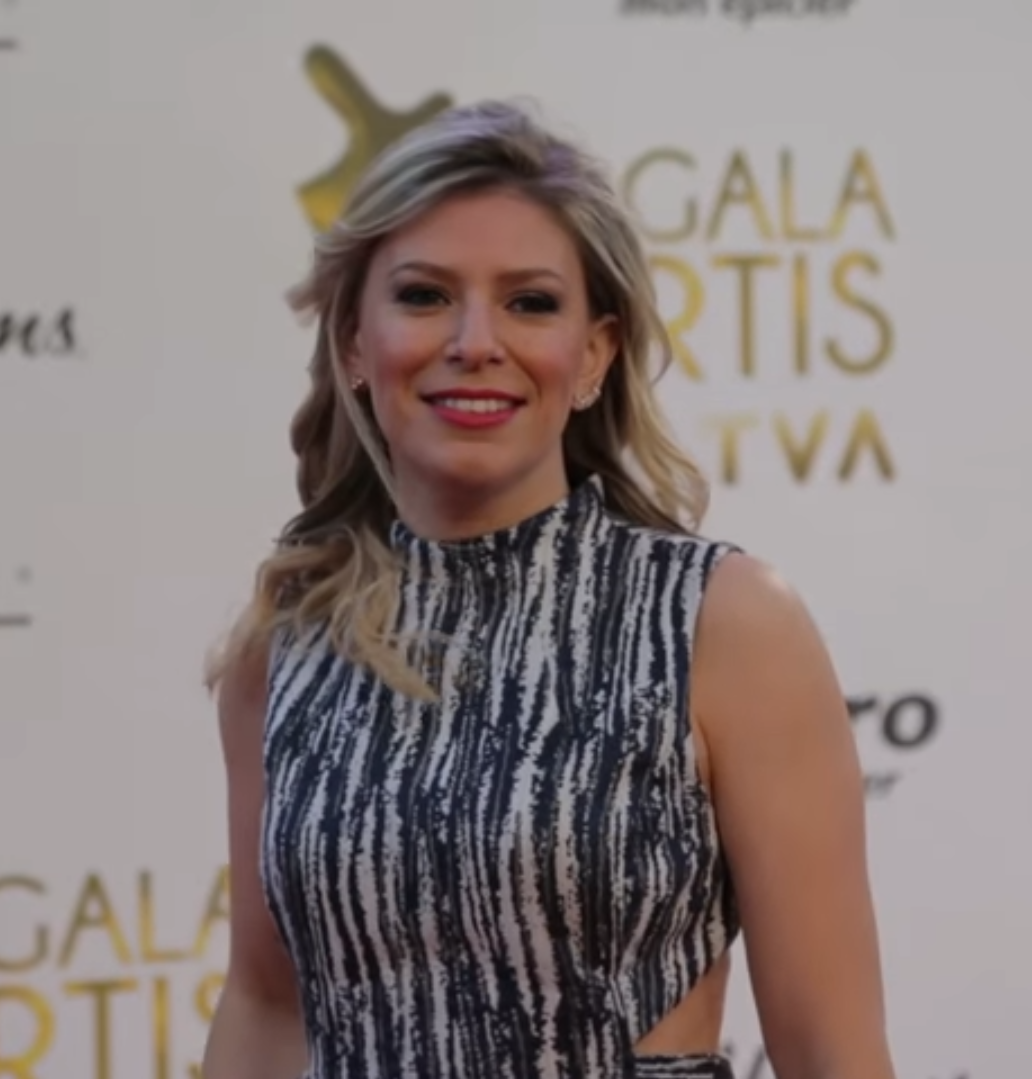
Anne-Marie Withenshaw

Anne-Marie Withenshaw is a Canadian television and radio personality, from Montreal, Quebec, Canada.

== Career ==
Withenshaw graduated from Concordia University with a Bachelor of Arts & Science in Communications Studies.

She started working on MuchMusic's French sister station, MusiquePlus, as a VJ in 1998, and remained there until 2002. While at MusiquePlus, she hosted Fax, a weekly music news show, L'Artiste du Mois, and Buzzé le Quiz Rock, a music game show.

She then moved on to French Canadian network television, as a reporter on TQS' daily entertainment program Flash. After leaving Flash in 2005 to host La Fosse Aux Lionnes, a daily current affairs talk-show on Radio-Canada (SRC-CBC) for one season, she returned to Flash as the new host in the fall of 2006. The show was a daily 30 minute entertainment program offering a mix of local and international stories in both French and English. Although the show aired live from TQS' studios, she often hosted the show from various locations abroad, such as movie premieres, The Oscars, The Grammys or the Cannes Film Festival.

She currently hosts the celebrity interview and restaurant guide "Guide Resto Voir" on travel channel Évasion (2009–2010), put out two restaurant guides of the same name, and is one of the four hosts of the series C'est Juste de la TV, on ARTV (2008–2010).

Parallel to her TV career, she has worked as a radio host since 1997. From 1999 to 2005, she hosted the weekly countdown show on the NRJ network. In 2007, she hosted a daily radio show called Le Withenshow on CKOI-FM 96.9 FM. Until 2010, she was a part of the CKOI-FM morning shows Juste pour le fun and Midi Morency. In the summer of 2010, she began hosting AM on Radio-Canada (SRC-CBC), a daily radio talk show airing nationally.

From 2009 to 2014 she hosted a weekly English-language entertainment show called All-Access Weekend on CKBE-FM, in which she interviewed celebrities from the world of music, fashion, film and sports. In November 2014, the show was cancelled, and Withenshaw sued the station over alleged breach of contract.
