= In the Story Book =

Canadian children's television series

- Genre: Children's television
- Narrated by: Steve Woodman
- Country of origin: Canada
- Original language: English
- No. of seasons: 1

Production
- Producer: Roger Racine
- Running time: 15 minutes

Original release
- Network: CBC Television
- Release: 12 November 1956 – 24 June 1957

In the Story Book is a Canadian children's television series that aired on CBC Television from 1956 to 1957.

== Premise ==
Classic stories were presented with pantomime and dance routines in this series geared for children up to age eight. Works covered include those by Hans Christian Andersen, J. M. Barrie, Lewis Carroll, and the Brothers Grimm.

== Production ==
This series was produced at CBC Montreal by Roger Racine, with stories adapted by Ann Fafoutakis. Heino Heiden was the program choreographer.

== Scheduling ==
This 15-minute series was broadcast on Mondays at 5:00 p.m. (Eastern) from 12 November 1956 to 24 June 1957.
