= Bill Haugland =

Retired Canadian TV news anchor

Bill Haugland (born 1942) is a Canadian journalist and former news anchor for CFCF-TV in Montreal, Quebec.

A native of Montreal, Haugland studied at Ryerson Institute of Technology and Concordia University. He joined CFCF-TV in 1961, when that station signed on for the first time.

As a reporter, Haugland covered many key events in Montreal and Quebec, including Expo 67 and the October Crisis in 1970.

Haugland became an anchor for CFCF's nightly newscast, Pulse, in 1977 (later renamed CFCF News in 2001, and later, CTV News in 2005). After becoming an anchor for Pulse, Haugland relocated from Montreal to Vermont; he commuted back and forth across the international border to anchor CFCF's newscast. He was also a host of CFCF's public affairs program, As It Is, for sixteen years, along with a similar program, On Assignment.

Haugland retired on November 30, 2006 after being associated with CFCF-TV for 45 years.

On August 5, 2009, Haugland's son Hugh, a cameraman for CFCF, died in a helicopter crash in Mont-Laurier while shooting footage of tornado damage.

Haugland has authored several books, including Mobil 9 (2009), The Bidding (2011), After it Rains (2013), and The Informants (2015).
