= CFCF-DT =

Television station in Montreal, Quebec, Canada

- Montreal, Quebec; Canada
- Channels: Digital: 12 (VHF); Virtual: 12
- Branding: CTV Montreal (general); CTV News Montreal (newscasts)

Programming
- Affiliations: 12.1: CTV

Ownership
- Owner: Bell Media Inc.
- Sister stations: CHOM-FM, CJAD, CJFM-FM, CKGM, CITE, CKMF, CFJP-DT

History
- First air date: January 20, 1961
- Former call signs: CFCF-TV (1961–2011)
- Former channel numbers: Analog: 12 (VHF, 1961–2011)
- Former affiliations: Independent (January–October 1961)
- Call sign meaning: "Canada's First, Canada's Finest" (taken from former sister radio station CFCF (AM), now defunct)

Technical information
- Licensing authority: CRTC
- ERP: 10.6 kW
- HAAT: 299.6 m (983 ft)
- Transmitter coordinates: 45°30′19″N 73°35′29″W

Links
- Website: CTV Montreal

CFCF-DT (channel 12, cable channel 11) is an English-language television station in Montreal, Quebec, Canada, owned and operated by the CTV Television Network, a division of Bell Media. It shares studios with Noovo flagship CFJP-DT (channel 35) at the Bell Media building (formerly the Montréal Téléport), at the intersection of Avenue Papineau and Boulevard René-Lévesque Est in downtown Montreal, with transmitter atop Mount Royal.

== History ==
=== Canadian Marconi Company (1961–1972) ===
CFCF-TV was founded by the Canadian Marconi Company, owner of CFCF radio (600 AM, later CINW on 940 AM before its closure in 2010; and 106.5 FM, now CKBE-FM at 92.5), after several failed attempts to gain a licence, beginning in 1938, and then each year after World War II. In 1960, it finally gained a licence, and began broadcasting on January 20, 1961 at 5:45 p.m. It was the second privately owned English language station in Quebec; CKMI-TV in Quebec City had signed on four years earlier in March 1957.

CFCF's classic logo, used from the late 1970s until 2001.

The station was originally located above the Avon Theatre. The first night on-air was fraught with problems. A power failure interrupted the opening ceremony, and later on, police raided the downstairs ballroom, with sirens blazing and a number of arrests made. The station's newscast, Pulse News, faced a few problems because of the noise from the ballroom. CFCF-AM-FM-TV moved into their own facilities at 405 Ogilvy Avenue in Montreal's Park Extension neighbourhood on May 19.

Channel 12 joined CTV as a charter affiliate on October 1, 1961. However, despite its status as CTV's second-largest affiliate, its relationship with CTV was somewhat acrimonious over the years. Canadian Marconi, as would channel 12's numerous owners over the years, felt CTV's flagship station, CFTO-TV in Toronto, had too much influence over the network.

=== Multiple Access (1972–1979) ===
In 1968, the Canadian Radio-television and Telecommunications Commission (CRTC) required that all broadcasting outlets be 80% Canadian owned. Canadian Marconi was a subsidiary of the UK-based General Electric Company, and was forced to put its entire broadcasting division—CFCF-TV, CFCF (AM), CFQR-FM and CFCX—on the market. A deal to sell the stations to Ernie Bushnell, owner of CJOH-TV in Ottawa, collapsed in the spring of 1971 when Bushnell was unable to secure the necessary financing. Later in 1971, Canadian Marconi agreed to sell the stations to computer and telecommunications company Multiple Access Ltd., owned by the Bronfman family. In so doing, Canadian Marconi earned a handsome return on its original investment in CFCF, which long claimed to be the oldest radio station in Canada.

Multiple Access bought the stations after the CRTC refused to approve purchase offers by Baton Broadcasting, owner of CFTO (other CTV partners opposed the sale, and Baton was not interested in buying the radio stations without channel 12 being included in the purchase), and by CHUM Limited (because of indecision over which radio stations would be sold to meet radio ownership limits in Montreal). Multiple Access also was co-owner of CITY-TV in Toronto (with CHUM) during this time (both Baton and CHUM-CITY, minus CHUM's television stations, became CTVglobemedia, which was later in turn became Bell Media, the current owner of CTV and CFCF).

=== CFCF Inc. (1979–1992) ===
In 1979, Multiple Access sold the stations and its production company, Champlain Productions, to CFCF Inc., headed by Jean Pouliot. This came after a deal by Baton (this time a willing partner) to purchase Multiple Access' Montreal broadcasting operations fell through. CHUM successfully purchased Multiple Access' Toronto operations (its share of CITY-TV). Later on, the station began broadcasting a 24-hour schedule full of classic television shows and movies during the late night hours, because of the popularity of VHS and Betamax VCRs by that time. As of the present day, the station now airs mostly infomercials in late night.

CFCF Inc., expanded to include the assets of CF Cable TV, which was acquired by Pouliot in 1982, and went public in 1985. In 1986, CFCF gained a sister station: CFJP-TV, the flagship station of Pouliot's new French language network, Television Quatre-Saisons (TQS); now known as Noovo. TQS spent most of its early years in serious financial difficulty; the revenues from channel 12 were all that kept it afloat. Two years later, the radio stations were sold to Mount-Royal Broadcasting, and moved out of the CFCF building a year later. 1986 also saw CFCF become the home base for a Canadian game show: The New Chain Reaction was taped there, as was the French counterpart, Action Réaction. Chain was initially hosted by Canadian musician Blake Emmons, but he quit after only a few weeks. Producer Bob Stewart then brought in Geoff Edwards to replace him; in turn, CFCF staff announcer Rod Charlebois was then given an on-air role, to satisfy CanCon requirements. This version ran until 1991 on Global in Canada and in America on the USA Network.

=== Canwest Global and Videotron (1992–1997) ===
Financial relief came to the company in the 1990s with an investment from Canwest Global Communications. In return, CFCF did not stand in the way of Canwest's plans to apply for a Global repeater station in Montreal. However, Canwest Global changed its mind, citing tax problems. It did, however, allow CFCF to carry some Global programs; it was already airing some programming from Citytv. This would not be the end of Global's influence at the station.

In 1997, TVA sold its controlling interest in CKMI to Canwest. The two companies announced plans to turn CKMI into a Global station, along with a CKMI repeater in Montreal and a large studio complex in Montreal. Pouliot was scared by the prospect of new competition and decided to get out. He initially planned to sell CFCF to Vidéotron. However, Vidéotron also owned TVA, which retained a 49 percent stake in CKMI. This would have resulted in one company having a significant stake in all of the private stations in Montreal – CFCF, CKMI, CFJP and TVA flagship CFTM-TV.

Vidéotron knew that the CRTC would never approve such an arrangement, so it sold CFCF to Western International Communications (WIC), who also owned CHAN-TV and CHEK-TV in British Columbia, CHCH-TV in Ontario and several stations in Alberta. Over the next few years, CFCF cut back its carriage of CTV programming to little more than the base schedule of 40 hours per week. This was due to longstanding tensions between WIC and CTV (echoing CFCF's longstanding concern that CFTO and Baton had too much influence over the network); the station filled out the rest of the schedule with WIC's own library of programming. This didn't pose a problem at first, since Ottawa's CJOH was available on cable in Montreal for most of the 1980s and 1990s. CJOH fed Montreal cable systems via a repeater in Cornwall, Ontario, whose footprint reaches Montreal. Meanwhile, TQS was sold to Quebecor, and later to Cogeco and Bell Globemedia (which later became CTVglobemedia and is now known as Bell Media).

Before 1997, when CHCH and CITY launched rebroadcast transmitters in the Ottawa region, local cable companies there carried CFCF as well. Because CHCH and CFCF were sharing some programs, CFCF was removed from these systems, except for Rogers Cable. Also around this time, CJOH was dropped from Montreal cable systems after its owner, Baton, bought a controlling interest in CTV.

=== CTV (2001–present) ===
CFCF-TV's former logo (2001–2005). As of October 2005, logos with the stations' callsigns are no longer used on CTV stations; instead they all use the main CTV logo.

Canwest bought WIC's television assets in 2000. However, the CRTC did not allow Canwest to twinstick CFCF with CKMI. The commission believed that the Montreal region's anglophone population was too small to allow a twinstick of the city's private anglophone stations. It did, however, allow Canwest to keep CJNT-TV, a multicultural station WIC had bought a year earlier. CFCF was placed under trusteeship, and had to be sold in short order. In 2001, amid all these wranglings over ownership, Bell Globemedia, owner of CTV, bought the station. After 40 years of being master of its own house to a large degree, CFCF lost much of that independence and maneuverability through the CTV/Bell Globemedia deal.

With the opening of the Fall 2001 television season, CFCF officially adopted the full CTV schedule. The newscast dropped its longtime Pulse title in favour of the generic CFCF News. However, the Pulse brand was so firmly established that viewers still continued to called the newscasts by that title for several years. The station also adopted a new golden call letter logo similar to all other CTV owned stations, as well as similar promo and newscast graphics.

In 2003, CFCF left its location on Ogilvy Avenue it had occupied since 1961 and moved to a studio on Papineau Avenue in the eastern part of downtown, and the master control operations were moved to 9 Channel Nine Court in Toronto, the home of CTV flagship CFTO. By this situation, CFCF overtook Vancouver's CIVT-TV to become the largest market with a CTV O&O station whose studios were located in a downtown area (Toronto's CFTO-TV/DT had operated in the same 9 Channel Nine Court studios since its inception). The area has now become Montreal's main media district. In addition to sister Bell Media properties Noovo and RDS, which are located in the same building as CFCF, the studio facilities of CBC/Radio-Canada, TVA, Télé-Québec, MétéoMédia and Bell Media's radio stations are all within several blocks.

On October 3, 2005, the station dropped the use of its call letters on-air, instead branding as simply "CTV", with the newscast becoming CTV News. This type of rebranding was instituted at all affiliates across the country to provide a common brand for the entire network.

By 2005, Bell Globemedia was considered to be a non-core asset by parent company Bell Canada Enterprises and was sold to a group of investors, which included the Thomson family. The Bell Globemedia group (made up of the entire CTV network, as well as The Globe and Mail newspaper and a variety of other channels and media assets) was renamed CTVglobemedia in late 2006. In April 2011, BCE re-acquired full ownership of CTVglobemedia and changed the new division's name to Bell Media. The new media giant also acquired CHUM Limited's holdings in 2006, including the A-Channel stations, MuchMusic and a variety of other specialty channels. But the CHUM deal also raised serious questions about the high degree of media concentration in Canada. This new conglomerate owned more than one television station in several Canadian markets—increasing the worry about job losses and cutbacks.

In 2009, CFCF discontinued the Telethon of Stars that aired during the first weekend of December, consecutively, for 32 years from 1977 to 2009; the removal of the telethon from the station was due to budget cuts made by CTV as a result of the economic crisis. In December 2010, the Telethon of Stars could only be seen through the Internet (via an 8-hour webcast), with no television equivalent broadcast. It was dropped entirely shortly thereafter.

On August 5, 2009, CTV camera operator, 44-year-old Hugh Haugland was killed after a helicopter crash near Mont-Laurier about 240 kilometres (149 mi) from Montreal, Haugland was shooting footage of the destruction left behind by a tornado that touched down in the area on August 4, 2009. Haugland was the son of Canadian journalist and retired former television news anchor for CFCF-TV in Montreal, Bill Haugland. The other person killed in the crash was Roger Belanger, a veteran pilot and local businessman who was in his 60s.

On August 16, 2024, a water main break on René Lévesque Boulevard caused the flooding and evacuation of CFCF's main studio and newsroom, as well as the closure of those facilities for eventual restoration. The flood destroyed several pieces of equipment stored in the station's basement, including satellite trucks and field equipment. Newscast production was temporarily moved to the offices of corporate parent BCE Inc. on nearby Nuns' Island. In September 2025, just over a year after the flooding, CFCF introduced a new virtual studio, combining chroma key walls and a physical desk and screens.

== Programming ==
CFCF airs the standard CTV schedule in pattern with CFTO; its only major difference had previously been the scheduling of certain syndicated programs in CTV's afternoon lineup to allow for simsubs with Burlington, Vermont–Plattsburgh, New York stations on cable (particularly Dr. Phil, which aired at 5 p.m. instead of 3 p.m. to simsub WVNY), but this was rendered moot when the shows were replaced by library sitcom reruns on the national schedule upon their conclusions.

In the past, some children's programming was preempted due to provincial regulations on advertising; the station now carries CTV's few remaining children's programs with public service announcements during ad breaks. As well, CFCF did not carry either Wheel of Fortune or Jeopardy! when these were part of the standard CTV schedule; both were picked up by the CBC nationally in the fall of 2008, only for them to be discarded in the fall of 2011.

CFCF has always been the highest-rated television station for Anglophone Quebecers, dwarfing the viewership commanded by CBMT (CBC Television and CKMI. As well, a significant number of bilingual Francophones also watch CFCF—for both programming and news—although CFTM, CFJP and CBFT-DT (Radio-Canada) are the market leaders for Quebec's French community.

== News operation ==
CFCF-DT presently dedicates 13 hours of air-time for locally produced newscasts each week (with 2 hours each weekday and 1 1/2 hours each on Saturdays and Sundays). The station's studios in Downtown Montreal also house the CTV News network division's Montreal news bureau.

Since 1986, one of CFCF's lead evening anchors has been Mutsumi Takahashi. Matt Grillo temporarily fills the spot of lead anchor of the weekend edition and Maya Johnson anchors the 5 and 11:30 p.m. bulletins. One of its most famous anchors, Bill Haugland, is now retired; his last newscast aired on November 30, 2006. Haugland worked at CFCF for more than 40 years. He covered major stories in the 1960s and 1970s before becoming the lead anchor at CFCF in the late-1970s. Haugland was an institution and in a special "Farewell to Bill" show broadcast on his final day, he was heralded by colleagues, viewers and former prime ministers alike. In December 2006, Haugland was replaced on an interim basis by Brian Britt, another CFCF veteran newscaster, until he too retired on July 24, 2008. Todd van der Heyden took over from Britt as co-anchor up until the end of 2011. Currently, Mutsumi Takahashi is the station's sole anchor for 6 p.m. evening broadcasts, as Bell Media eliminated the co-anchor position due to cost-cutting measures.

Until March 10, 2009, CFCF aired a weekday morning newscast at 6 a.m. called First News, which pre-empted the first half hour of Canada AM; anchored by Herb Luft, it was cancelled in favor of an early start time for Canada AM, which was then seen in its entirety starting at 6 a.m. Morning news briefs seen during Canada AM were also cancelled. Luft would continue his role as reporter for the station, until retiring in June 2010. These cancellations were part of continuing cutbacks made by CTV due to the economic crisis.

On May 11, 2011, it was announced that longtime 11:30 p.m. news anchor Debra Arbec had left the station to become the main anchor at CBC O&O CBMT-DT. Various other anchors filled in the void for the remainder of May and then June 2011. CTV reporter/former CJAD and CJFM news announcer Catherine Sherriffs became Arbec's permanent replacement on July 4, 2011.

On December 2, 2011, Todd van der Heyden announced he would step down at the end of the month to become an anchor at CTV News Channel in Toronto. Beginning in 2012, weekend anchor Paul Karwatsky was appointed as interim anchor to replace Van der Heyden while a permanent anchor was found. During the evening, on January 18, 2012, it was made official that Karwatsky would occupy the permanent co-anchor position.

On July 29, 2014, several layoffs were announced by CTV Montreal's general manager. Among them was Catherine Sherriffs, who at the time was on maternity leave, and was told her job anchoring the 11:30 p.m. newscast was no more. Instead, Paul Karwatsky, already co-anchoring the 6 p.m. and occasionally the 11:30 p.m. news, took over as anchor for the 11:30 p.m. spot permanently.

On June 20, 2017, local sportscast programming was cancelled, resulting in the immediate layoff of the entire sports department, which included long-time anchor Randy Tieman, reporter Brian Wilde and weekend anchor Sean Coleman (a dedicated sports department had been part of CFCF-12 since its inception, and once even included noted and retired hockey broadcaster Dick Irvin; for 30 years, between 1961 and 1991, Irvin had been a longtime veteran sports director and anchor at the station).

On November 14, 2017, long-time executive producer Barry Wilson, best known for his Postscript editorial, was laid off as part of Bell Media's ongoing cost-cutting measures.

In December 2018, long-time weekend anchor Tarah Schwartz left CTV.

In January 2020, news reporter and weekend anchor Annie DeMelt left CTV to join the MUHC Communications team.

On September 4, 2020, news anchor Paul Karwatsky left CTV, with Caroline Van Vlaardingen filling the spot on an interim basis. It was announced on November 9 that Maya Johnson would take over as anchor for the 5 p.m. and 11:30 p.m. news.

On February 1, 2021, as part of Bell Media's ongoing cost-cutting, it announced the elimination of its Quebec City reporter position.

On June 2, 2022, long-time news director Jed Kahane was laid off as part of Bell Media's ongoing cost-cutting measures.

On September 29, 2023, long-time news reporter Cindy Sherwin left CTV.

On November 13, 2023, Bell Media cut local 5 p.m. news broadcasts down to just 30 minutes, replacing the latter half with a CTV National News feed from 5:30 to 5:59 p.m.

On November 26, 2023, weekend news anchor Amanda Kline left CTV, with initially Caroline Van Vlaardingen, then Matt Grillo, filling the spot on an interim basis.

On February 8, 2024, as part of Bell Media's largest cost-cutting in nearly 30 years, the station cancelled its local noon and holiday newscasts. Additionally, reporter Vanessa Lee, long time production assistant and movie reviewer Mosé Persico (of nearly 40 years), weather presenter Lise McAuley (of nearly 25 years) and assignment editor Derek Conlon (of nearly 20 years) were laid off.

On May 30, 2024, long-time weather specialist Lori Graham (of over 25 years) left CTV.

== Notable personalities ==
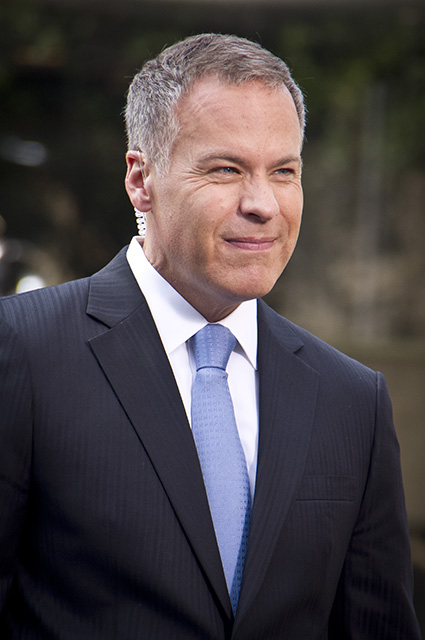
Leslie Roberts

- Mike Duffy – lineup and assignment editor (1969–1971)
- Bill Haugland – reporter, host of Pulse newscast (1961–2006)
- Dick Irvin Jr. – sports director (1962–1991)
- Don McGowan – evening news weather presenter, talk show host, co-anchor of the late night news (1962–1998)
- Pierre Pascau – investigative reporter (1965–1974)
- Leslie Roberts – general assignment reporter (1985–1995), host and news anchor (1998–2000)
- Mutsumi Takahashi – reporter/news presenter (since 1982)
- Todd van der Heyden – reporter/news presenter (2000–2011)

== Technical information ==
=== Subchannel ===
Subchannel of CFCF-DT
Channel	Res.	Short name	Programming
12.1	1080i	CFCF	CTV

=== Analog-to-digital conversion ===
The station began providing a high definition feed to Videotron and Bell Fibe on December 1, 2009, and in September 2010 respectively. Its digital signal signed on over-the-air on temporary pre-transition UHF channel 51 on January 28, 2011.

On August 31, 2011, when Canadian television stations in CRTC-designated mandatory markets transitioned from analog to digital broadcasts, the station relocated its digital signal from channel 51 to VHF channel 12. The shutdown of its analog signal and temporary digital transmitter occurred just after its 11:30 p.m. newscast that evening.
