= CJFM-FM =

Contemporary hit radio station in Montreal

- Montreal, Quebec; Canada
- Broadcast area: Greater Montreal
- Frequency: 95.9 MHz
- Branding: 95.9 Virgin Radio

Programming
- Language: English
- Format: Contemporary hit radio

Ownership
- Owner: Bell Media; (Bell Media Radio G.P.)
- Sister stations: CJAD; CKGM; CHOM-FM; CITE-FM; CKMF-FM; CFCF-DT; CFJP-DT

History
- First air date: October 1, 1962

Technical information
- Licensing authority: CRTC
- Class: C1
- ERP: 41,200 watts
- HAAT: 297.4 metres (976 ft)
- Transmitter coordinates: 45°30′20.16″N 73°35′30.12″W

Links
- Webcast: Listen live (via iHeartRadio)
- Website: www.virginradio.ca/montreal.html

CJFM-FM (95.9 FM) is a commercial English-language radio station located in Montreal, Quebec, Canada. Owned and operated by Bell Media, the station broadcasts a contemporary hit radio format branded as 95.9 Virgin Radio.

CJFM-FM broadcasts with an effective radiated power of 41,200 watts (Class C1) using an omnidirectional antenna located atop Mount Royal, at 297.4 metres (976 ft) in height above average terrain. Its studios are located at the Bell Media building at 1717 René-Lévesque Boulevard East in Downtown Montreal.

== History ==
The station first signed on the air on October 1, 1962. CJFM was one of four FM stations which came on the air in the 1960s using common transmitting facilities on the new Mount Royal tower, the other stations being CFCF-FM, CJMS-FM and CKGM-FM.

CJFM 96 had several formats through the 1960s, 1970s and 1980s, including easy listening, album-oriented rock and adult contemporary. By 1992, CJFM changed monikers to Mix 96, and altered its format to a more Top 40-leaning hot adult contemporary format. In that era, the CRTC did not want FM stations airing a Top 40 format in order to protect the AM band. As such, FM stations like CJFM went as far as they could with hot AC, featuring a broader playlist than AM Top 40 stations.

From 1962 to 2007, CJFM was owned by Standard Broadcasting. Standard Broadcasting sold the station to Astral Media in 2007. In 2013, Astral was acquired by Bell Media.

=== Virgin Radio (2009–present) ===
Mix 96 logo

On December 4, 2008, Astral announced that CJFM, as with sister stations CKQB-FM in Ottawa and CKZZ-FM in Vancouver, would be rebranded as a "Virgin Radio" station, effective January 12, 2009. This is in addition to an existing "Virgin" station, CKFM-FM in Toronto.

On January 12, at 4 pm, the station rebranded as Virgin Radio 96. The final song played on "Mix" was "It's the End of the World as We Know It (And I Feel Fine)" by Great Big Sea, while the first song played on "Virgin" was Madonna's "Like a Virgin". CJFM kept the same hot AC format and most of its on-air staff from its "Mix" days, albeit with several programming changes. By July 2016, CJFM made the transition to contemporary hit radio, putting it in line with the "Virgin" branding that Bell Media has been expanding in Canada.

Previously, when CIDC-FM in Toronto moved from dance hits to mainstream Top 40, CJFM was the only radio station in Canada playing dance Top 40 music every day. From Sunday to Thursday, the all-dance hours were midnight to 3 am, and Fridays and Saturdays from 7 pm to 5 am.

On March 4, 2018, CJFM rebranded as 95.9 Virgin Radio, dropping the "96" from its branding for the first time in the station's history.

In October 2021, WYUL in Chateaugay, New York (which serves the Montreal area) was sold to the Educational Media Foundation and flipped to contemporary Christian music as K-Love, leaving CJFM as the only English-language CHR station in Montreal.
