= CHOM-FM =

Radio station in Montreal

- Montreal, Quebec; Canada
- Broadcast area: Greater Montreal
- Frequency: 97.7 MHz
- Branding: CHOM 97 7

Programming
- Format: Mainstream rock

Ownership
- Owner: Bell Media; (Bell Media Radio)
- Sister stations: CFCF-DT, CITE-FM, CJAD, CJFM-FM, CKGM, CKMF-FM, CFJP-DT

History
- First air date: July 16, 1963
- Former call signs: CKGM-FM (1963–1971)
- Call sign meaning: Randomly chosen

Technical information
- Class: C1
- ERP: 41,200 watts
- HAAT: 297.4 metres (976 ft)
- Transmitter coordinates: 45°30′20.16″N 73°35′30.12″W

Links
- Webcast: Listen Live
- Website: chom.com

CHOM-FM (97.7 MHz) is a commercial FM radio station in Montreal, Quebec, Canada. Owned and operated by Bell Media, it broadcasts a mainstream rock radio format. The studios are in the Bell Media Building at 1717 René Lévesque Boulevard East in Downtown Montreal. Rather than spelling out the call letters, personalities on the station usually pronounce them as /ˈʃoʊm/ SHOHM, although other Bell Media Radio personalities have also pronounced the call sign as /ˈtʃɒm/ CHOM.

CHOM-FM is a Class C1 station. It has an effective radiated power (ERP) of 41,200 watts using a non-directional antenna atop Mount Royal.

== History ==
=== Early years (1963–1974) ===
The station was founded by Geoff Stirling as CKGM-FM. It was a sister station to CKGM, then broadcasting at 980 kHz. CKGM-FM signed on the air on July 16, 1963.

After a few weeks as a simulcast of CKGM, CKGM-FM launched an automated beautiful music format on September 1, 1963. CKGM-FM played quarter-hour sweeps of mostly soft instrumental music with low-key announcements and commercials.

On October 28, 1969, CKGM-FM changed its format to album-oriented rock (AOR). On-air advertising was kept at a minimum. The first song played by Doug Pringle after the format switch was Richard Strauss' "Also sprach Zarathustra", followed by The Beatles' "Here Comes the Sun". Management wanted to give the FM station its own identity, separate from the Top 40 format found on CKGM. CKGM-FM changed its call sign to CHOM-FM almost two years later, on October 19, 1971.

=== Going bilingual (1974–1977) ===
In 1974, CHOM proposed to the Canadian Radio-television and Telecommunications Commission (CRTC) a plan in which the station would become bilingual, reflecting the population of Montreal, partially English and partially French. The CRTC accepted this plan but only on an experimental basis that would last three years. It also turned down a plan to implement quadraphonic broadcasting. CHOM had a staff of disc jockeys who mixed the two languages. Some were more familiar with English, some with French, but they could converse either way.

In 1977, the experimental bilingual operation had come to an end. The station was forced by the CRTC to opt between the two languages, and after considering becoming a French-language station, it finally reverted to English full-time. On-air advertising steadily increased during the late 1970s. Furthermore, CHOM's original format of AOR and "underground" rock tunes changed to include the playing of the top tracks from the biggest selling albums.

=== CHUM takeover and Howard Stern (1979–2002) ===
CHOM-FM became increasingly popular, and in 1979 surpassed its sister station CKGM in Bureau of Broadcast Measurement (BBM) ratings. Both stations were sold to CHUM Limited on August 20, 1985.

Promotional bumper sticker distributed in the 1990s by CHOM with its 1990s logo (an updated version of the 1980s cursive logo). Logo facelifts were made in the 1990s until its retirement in 2002.

In 1997, CHOM acquired the rights to The Howard Stern Show, syndicated from New York City. Stern was a hit in several U.S. radio markets and wanted to try his hand in Canada's top two cities, in Toronto at CILQ-FM and in Montreal at CHOM. The show made its debut on CHOM's morning drive time on September 2, 1997. From the start, it drew much controversy. On his very first show heard in Montreal, Stern delivered an anti-Francophone and anti-French tirade.

Here are four quotes from Howard Stern's broadcast on September 2, 1997, where he insulted the French and French-Canadians.

"The biggest scumbags on the planet as I've said all along are not only the French in France but the French in Canada."

"Anybody who speaks French is a scumbag. It turns you into a coward, just like in World War Two the French would not stick up for us."

"I think that the French from Quebec are as silly as the French over in France."

"There is something about the French language that turns you into a pussy-assed jack-off."

"French-speaking people in Quebec have been fighting this... they are a bunch of snivelling cowards."

His show was cancelled a year later, on August 27, 1998, after numerous complaints to the CRTC. Those gripes included politically incorrect remarks interpreted by complainants as sexist and homophobic.

=== Classic Rock and Standard Radio ownership (2002–2007) ===
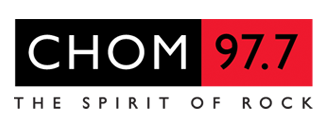
Logo used from 2002 to 2010

Over time, CHOM relied less and less on current and recent rock releases. Nearly all songs on its playlist were classic rock, familiar to its audience and recorded in the 1960s, 1970s and 1980s. This continued for nearly two decades. But by the 2020s, the station returned to a mix of classic rock along with a few current and releases each hour.

Effective in January 2002, the station was sold to Standard Broadcasting, which already owned CJAD and CJFM-FM in Montreal. The deal was in exchange for Standard's CFWM-FM in Winnipeg.

=== Astral Media (2007–2013) ===
Ownership changed hands again on October 29, 2007. Astral Media took control of Standard Broadcasting and its assets, including CHOM.

On June 22, 2011, Astral Media announced that popular disc jockey Terry DiMonte would be making a return to the station. DiMonte had hosted the morning show for several years on CHOM.

=== Bell Media (2013-present) ===
In July 2013, Astral Media was acquired and merged into Bell Media. With the merger, CHOM was reunited with its original AM sister station CKGM, which CTVglobemedia (now Bell Media) acquired from CHUM in 2007.

On September 22, 2017, longtime radio personality Robert "TooTall" Wagenaar retired from his midday show after over 40 years at CHOM. His replacement was Randy Renaud, a 30-year veteran of the radio station.

On May 28, 2021, Terry Dimonte left the station.

=== Studio locations ===
When first launched in 1963, CHOM (then known as CKGM-FM) had its studios and offices at 1455 Drummond Street in Montreal, along with CKGM. Like CKGM, CHOM moved to 1310 Greene Avenue in Westmount in the late 1960s.

In 1972, CHOM relocated across the street to 1355 Greene Avenue, while CKGM opted to stay at 1310 Greene. CHOM eventually returned to the CKGM building a few years later. It remained there until its acquisition by Standard Broadcasting in 2002. At that point, CHOM was moved to 1411 Fort Street in Montreal. That building also housed Standard's other two existing Montreal radio stations, CJFM-FM and CJAD.

In September 2012, Astral Media relocated its local English-language radio stations (including CHOM) to its French-language radio studios at 1717 René Lévesque Boulevard East in Montreal.
