= CJAD =

Radio station in Montreal

- Montreal, Quebec; Canada
- Broadcast area: Greater Montreal
- Frequency: 800 kHz (AM)
- Branding: CJAD 800

Programming
- Format: News/Talk
- Affiliations: The Canadian Press; ABC News Radio; CBS News Radio; Premiere Networks

Ownership
- Owner: Bell Media; (Bell Media Radio)
- Sister stations: CFCF-DT, CHOM-FM, CJFM-FM, CKGM, CITE-FM, CKMF-FM, CFJP-DT

History
- First air date: December 8, 1945
- Call sign meaning: Joseph-Arthur Dupont (founder)

Technical information
- Class: B
- Power: 50,000 watts day 10,000 watts night
- Transmitter coordinates: 45°14′49.92″N 73°31′23.16″W
- Repeater: 107.3 CITE-FM HD2 (Montreal)

Links
- Webcast: Listen live (via iHeartRadio)
- Website: www.cjad800.com

CJAD (800 AM) is a commercial radio station operating in Montreal, Quebec, Canada. The station has an English language news/talk radio format and identifies itself on-air as CJAD 800. Owned and operated by Bell Media, it has a daytime power of 50,000 watts but reduces power to 10,000 watts at night to avoid interfering with other stations on 800 AM. The transmitter is located near Saint-Édouard, while studios and offices are located on René-Lévesque Boulevard East in Downtown Montreal. CJAD can be heard across Canada on Bell Satellite TV channel 953.

Local hosts are heard throughout the day and evening. Affiliated with CBS News Radio for many years, in 2018 the station, along with many other Bell-owned talk radio stations in Canada, switched to NBC News Radio and 24/7 News for U.S. and international news.

CJAD and co-owned CKGM are currently the only two full-time commercial English-language stations in Quebec on the AM band.

== History ==
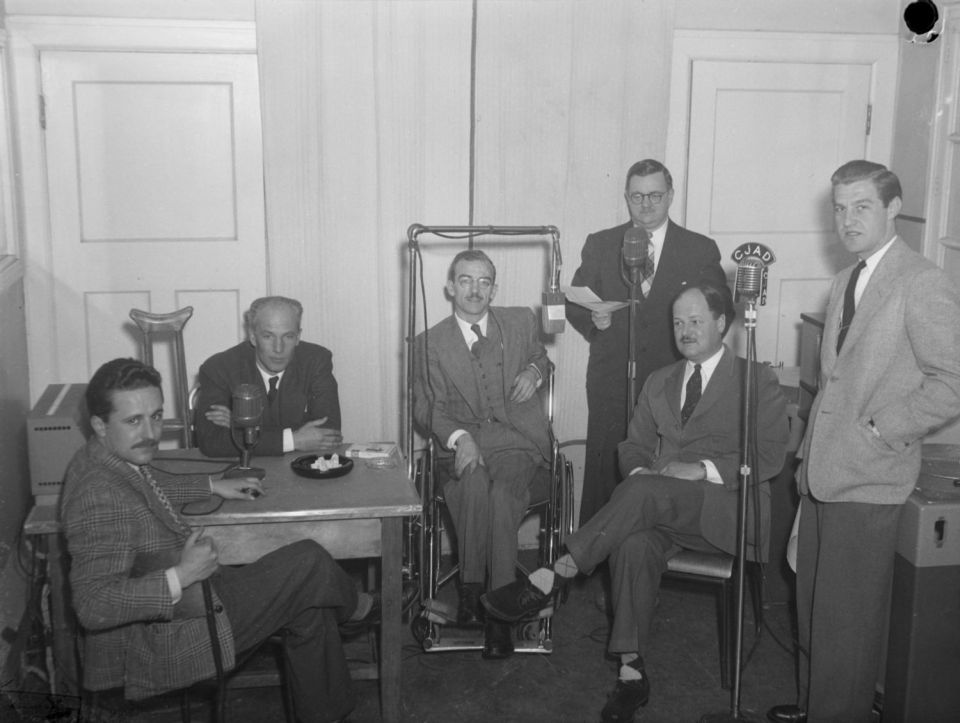
The CJAD studios in 1948

=== Early years ===
CJAD was founded by J. Arthur Dupont in 1945, basing the call sign on his initials. CJAD is often called Montreal's heritage anglophone station, particularly since the demise of the city's oldest anglophone station, CINW (successor to CFCF, Canada's first radio station). CJAD signed on the air on December 8, 1945. In its first years, CJAD had its studios and offices on Rue de la Montagne (Mountain Street) in Montreal, now the site of O'Sullivan College.

In 1961, CJAD was purchased by Standard Broadcasting. In 1978, control of Standard Broadcasting was purchased by Conrad Black via Hollinger Inc. In 1985, Standard was purchased by Slaight Communications, a privately held company owned by J. Allan Slaight.

In 1962, sister station 95.9 CJFM was launched, with programming always separate from CJAD.

=== Full service format ===
For most of its history, CJAD had a full service format. The music was mainly middle of the road songs in the 1960s and 70s, switching to an adult contemporary sound by the 1980s. Two specialized shows were heard on weekends: "The Bandstand" with Dick Irvin Jr., and "Starlight Concert" with Rod Dewar. In 1995, CJAD shifted its format to full-time news/talk, dropping all music and entertainment, save for the Sunday morning Trivia Show and the CJAD Comedy Show, also heard on Sundays.

Starting in 1992, almost all of CJAD's programming was simulcast on Corus Entertainment-owned 900 CKTS in Sherbrooke. On November 19, 2006, CKTS ceased broadcasting, signing off the transmitter and surrendering its licence to the Canadian Radio-television and Telecommunications Commission (CRTC). According to Corus, this was because of high ongoing maintenance costs that neither Corus nor Standard were willing to cover.

=== Ownership changes ===
In April 2007, Astral Media and Standard Broadcasting announced that Standard had agreed to sell CJAD and its other Montreal stations to Astral. On March 16, 2012, Bell Media announced that it had entered in an agreement to acquire Astral Media for an estimated value at $3.38 billion, with the deal including CJAD and its sister radio stations in Montreal.

On Labour Day Weekend, 2012, CJAD, as well as its sister stations previously owned by Astral, moved from 1411 Fort Street to new facilities in the Bell Media Radio building on René-Lévesque Boulevard East at Papineau Avenue.

=== 1998 Ice Storm ===
In January 1998, all four of CJAD's broadcast towers toppled during The Ice Storm. CJAD's first attempt to get back on the air was to use CKGM's former AM 980 transmitter, re-tuned to the 800 frequency. This, however, turned out to be impossible as the 980 site was damaged by ice as well. CJAD then made arrangements to broadcast on CFMB's former 1410 transmitter, but the signal was poor to the west. CJAD management then reached an agreement with CHUM Limited to use their CKGM transmitter on 990 kHz until new towers were erected.

== News ==
A large part of CJAD's daily programs are talk shows discussing local and international news. CJAD broadcasts newscasts every 30 minutes, except overnights when newscasts are delivered every hour, on the hour. Live @ Five is a half-hour news program broadcast at 5 a.m. on weekdays. Traffic updates air every 15 minutes during the day and every 30 minutes late nights.

On weekdays, James Foster and veteran anchor Trudie Mason deliver morning newscasts, with Jason Mayoff taking over in the afternoons. Dawn Kagan-Fleming serves as anchor on weekend mornings.

Overnight news is read during the week by James Foster. Longtime anchor and reporter Tom Armour retired in 2015. Armour died in December 2018.

Some of the station's notable former reporters include Shuyee Lee, Claude Beaulieu, Patrick Lejtenyi, Angelica Montgomery, Tina Tenneriello, Matthew Gilmour, Michel Boyer, Natalie Nanowski, Benson Cook, Elizabeth Zogalis, Sofia Misenheimer, and Emily Campbell. Sidney Margles, Peter Shurman and Rick Leckner were notable reporters from the 1950s, 1960s and 1970s.

On February 2, 2021, CJAD's newsroom was eliminated as part of a major round of layoffs by Bell Media. CTV Montreal reporters file reports for CJAD, and the station's late-night anchors will read news headlines on CJAD during the evening hours. It was later announced that Natasha Hall and Aaron Rand's afternoon and evening shows would be replaced by a co-hosted afternoon show, and that a simulcast of CTV News at 6 would also be added to its lineup. The cuts were among 210 across the company, which also included a similar elimination of staff at Toronto sister station CFRB. In December 2024, Bell Media announced that CTV News would combine its Quebec newsroom with that of its French-language radio stations and Noovo.

== Sports ==
CJAD is the exclusive English radio broadcaster of the CFL's Montreal Alouettes. Some game broadcasts are simulcast on sister station CHOM 97.7 FM. CJAD was the longtime English radio home of the Montreal Canadiens hockey team, until the 2010–11 season. In June 2010 it was announced that Canadiens broadcasts would switch to sports radio station CKGM, now on 690 AM and co-owned with CJAD.

In July 2012, Bell Media, owner of CKGM, announced that English-language rights to the Canadiens could return to CJAD following its proposed acquisition of Astral Media, if its conversion of CKGM to a French-language sports station (which would have been done to satisfy ownership limits preventing the merged company from owning both CJAD and CKGM if they both broadcast in English) were approved by the CRTC. On October 18, 2012, the CRTC rejected Bell's proposal to acquire Astral Media; since the application to convert CKGM into a French station was contingent on the approval of the Astral merger, it too was rejected.

On March 5, 2012, it was announced that CJAD would be the exclusive English language radio broadcaster of Montreal Impact soccer team for the next two years.

Beginning in September 2013, CKGM (TSN 690) staffers began providing sports updates for co-owned CJAD. Until recently, Rick Moffat did the weekday morning sports, Mitch Gallo does the weekday afternoon sports, and Amanda Stein does the weekend morning sports for CJAD as well as TSN 690.

== Transmitter ==
CJAD broadcasts with 50,000 watts in the daytime, the maximum power permitted for Canadian AM stations. At night, power drops to 10,000 watts to avoid interfering with other stations using the 800 kHz frequency, namely CKLW in Windsor, Ontario. CJAD must also protect the Class A station on AM 800, XEROK in Ciudad Juárez, Chihuahua, Mexico. CJAD's antenna is a four-tower array, located near Saint-Édouard, using two different directional patterns for day and night.

The previous logo of CJAD from 2007-2011 used until Aaron Rand returned to the station. During the Standard Radio era from 2002-2007, the words inside the red rectangles were in black.
