= CINW =

Radio station in Montreal (1919–2010)

- Final logo as AM 940
- Montreal, Quebec; Canada
- Frequency: 940 kHz

Ownership
- Owner: Corus Quebec; (Metromedia CMR Broadcasting Inc.)
- Sister stations: CFQR-FM, CINF

History
- First air date: May 20, 1920
- Last air date: January 29, 2010; (89 years, 254 days)
- Former call signs: XWA (1919–1921); 9AM (1921–1922); CFCF (1922–1991); CIQC (1991–1999)
- Former frequencies: 440 metres ≈ 682 kHz (1922–1928); 1030 kHz (1928–1933); 600 kHz (1933–2000)
- Call sign meaning: "Canada's information and news station" (former all-news format)

Technical information
- Class: A
- Power: 50,000 watts
- Transmitter coordinates: 45°23′34.08″N 73°41′53.16″W
- Translator: SW: (6.005 MHz) CFCX (Montreal)

CINW was the final call sign used by an English language AM radio station in Montreal, Canada, which, along with French-language sister station CINF, ceased operations at 7:00 p.m. ET on January 29, 2010. Owned and operated by Corus Quebec, it broadcast on 940 kHz with a full-time power of 50,000 watts as a clear channel, Class A station, using a slightly directional antenna designed to improve reception in downtown Montreal.

Due to its heritage, the station is generally considered to be Canada's first and oldest broadcasting station, as well as one of the first in the world.

== History ==
As with most early broadcasting stations, some of the station's earliest activities are poorly documented. In Listening In, a 1992 history of early Canadian radio, author Mary Vipond noted that "Several different versions of the gradual transformation of XWA from an experimenter in radio telephony to a regular broadcaster (with the call letters CFCF) exist" and "the precise date on which XWA/CFCF began regular programming may be impossible to determine". This uncertainty was evident when, in 1928, the station manager wrote to the Radio Branch in Ottawa asking "would you kindly let us know the date of our first broadcast", to which the reply was "We do not have the exact details of this on our files, but find that test programmes were carried out by your Company in Montreal during the winter evenings of 1919, and regular organized programs were commenced in December, 1920, by your Experimental Station, 'XWA' on a wavelength of 1200 metres [250 kHz]."

=== XWA / 9AM (1919–1922) ===
CINW's history was generally said to have begun with experimental station XWA, licensed to the Marconi Wireless Telegraph Company of Canada (Canadian Marconi), which was a wholly owned subsidiary of London based Marconi's Wireless Telegraph Company (British Marconi). XWA's first licence was granted sometime between April 1, 1914 and March 31, 1915, in conjunction with a training school on Rodney Street, and it was one of the few radio stations allowed to operate in Canada during World War I, when it was used to conduct military research.

XWA's transmissions were initially limited to Morse code "dots-and-dashes" produced by spark transmitters. However, during the war vacuum-tube transmitters were developed which made audio transmissions practical. In spring 1919 Canadian Marconi's Arthur Runciman began voice transmission tests in downtown Montreal and in the Montreal harbor using a Captain Round type vacuum-tube powered by a 500 volt battery, as the government lifted the restrictions imposed during the war on the use of radio by non-military personnel or organizations. In March 1919 Canadian Marconi announced that it was planning to "install the new wireless telephone at important points in and around Montreal in the near future", in order that "the public will be able to test for themselves the latest development in long distance communication". There were also plans to install one of the devices in the Transportation Building office of J. N. Greenshields, president of the Montreal Board of Trade, which "will enable brokers to talk with Kingston, Ottawa, Three Rivers and Quebec".

In early 1919, British Marconi shipped a bulky combination desk and 500-watt transmitter, shaped like an upright piano, to the Canadian Marconi building in Montreal at 173 William Street (later re-numbered as 1017). The set, capable of two-way radiotelephone and longer-range radiotelegraph operation, had been developed during World War I, but with the end of the war was now surplus. The parent company hoped there might be commercial interest within the Canadian paper and pulp industry in using transmitters like this for communication between their mills and offices. It was installed on the building's top floor, and operated under the XWA call sign.

The earliest tests and demonstrations focused more on using the transmitter for point-to-point communication than for broadcasting. This required engineers to repeatedly speak simple phrases, with pauses to listen if there were any replies. As was common at a number of early stations, the engineers soon tired of their repetitive talking, and began to play phonograph records to provide test signals. This in turn drew the attention of interested local amateur radio enthusiasts, who enjoyed hearing music instead of the usual telegraphic code used almost universally for radio communication at this time. In addition, during the fall of 1919 Canadian Marconi formed a separate company, Scientific Experimenter, Ltd., to sell equipment to radio amateurs. By December 1919, the company was using the XWA radio broadcasts of music in order to interest people in purchasing receiving sets, thus introducing a whole new industry to Canada, although at first persons operating radio receivers were required to hold an "Amateur Experimental Station" licence, as well as pass the exam needed to receive an "Amateur Experimental Certificate of Proficiency", which required the ability to send and receive Morse code at five words a minute. In January 1922 the government lowered the barrier for individuals merely interested in receiving broadcasts, by introducing a new licence category, Private Receiving Station, that removed the need to qualify for an amateur radio licence. Initially these licences cost $1 and had to be renewed each year.

The first documented broadcast of entertainment by XWA to a general audience occurred on the evening of May 20, 1920, when a concert was prepared for a Royal Society of Canada audience listening 110 miles (175 kilometres) away at the Château Laurier in the capital city of Ottawa. This was part of a demonstration of the longrange capabilities of radiotelephony arranged by Dr. A. S. Eve of the Royal Society, who was giving a lecture reviewing "Some Inventions of the Great War". In Montreal, Canadian Marconi's chief engineer J. O. G. Cann opened the broadcast with a series of announcements, including reading a sealed message previously sent by Dr. R. F. Ruttan, which was followed by the playing of phonograph records, beginning with "Dear Old Pal of Mine". Also included was live entertainment featuring Dorothy Lutton, who sang "Believe Me, if All Those Endearing Young Charms" and "Merrily Shall I Live". A Naval Radio Service station in Ottawa also participated, with officer E. Hawken singing "Annie Laurie", along with the playing of phonograph records. The Ottawa transmissions were well heard at the Château Laurier, but had difficulty being received in Montreal. At the time these broadcasts received little publicity beyond a few local newspaper reports, in contrast to a similar broadcast made a month later by the Marconi station near London at Chelmsford in Essex, featuring Dame Nellie Melba, which garnered broad international attention. In May 2020 the Canadian Post issued two commemorative stamps marking the centennial of this broadcast.

XWA eventually began operating on a regular schedule in order to promote radio receiver sales, and at first the station was almost single-handedly run by Darby Coats. (Coats went on to have a long broadcasting career.) A phonograph player and records were provided by a Sainte Catherines West music store in return for on-air acknowledgments. Performers weren't paid, so live entertainment was provided by song pluggers promoting sheet music sales, amateurs (sometimes with more enthusiasm than talent), and the occasional professional looking for publicity or intrigued by the new technology. By June 1921 interest in broadcasting had increased to the point that Canadian Marconi began publishing the Canadian Wireless Magazine, with Coats as the editor, initially just four pages long, but, reflecting the rapidly growing interest in radio, expanding to twenty pages a year later.

The chronology is not completely clear, but by 1921 the station's experimental call sign was changed to "9AM", reflecting a call sign policy change implemented in 1919 in conjunction with the restoration of civilian radio stations. (Broadcasting licences did not exist at this time.) A short notice in the November 1921 issue of QST magazine reported that the station, now using 9AM, was broadcasting once a week on Tuesdays starting at 8 p.m., using a wavelength of 1200 metres (250 kHz).

=== CFCF (1922–1991) ===
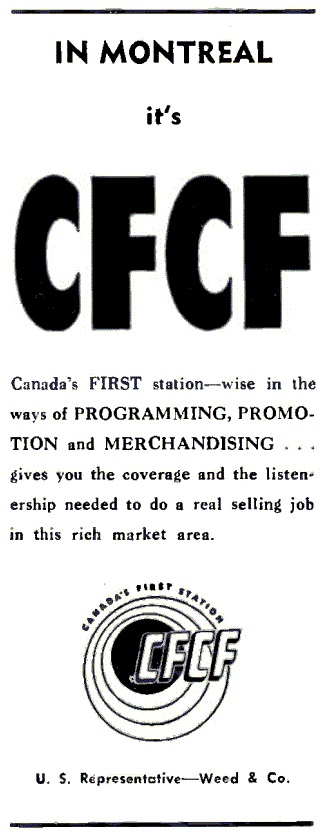
Station advertisements included the slogan "Canada's First Station".

In April 1922 the Canadian government began issuing the first licences specifically for "radio-telephone broadcasting stations". Initially all these stations received four-letter call signs starting with "CF", "CH", "CJ" or "CK", plus one additional "C" as the third or fourth letter. Included in the first group of twenty-three stations was a Montreal grant for Canadian Marconi, assigned a transmitting wavelength of 440 metres (682 kHz) and the call letters CFCF. The slogan "Canada's First, Canada's Finest" was later adopted based on the new call sign.

After numerous frequency changes, followed by a three-year period from 1925 to 1928 when it shared time with CKAC on 730 kHz, CFCF began operating full-time at 600 kHz in 1933, which would remain the station's transmitting frequency until 1999. CFCF was an affiliate of the Canadian Broadcasting Corporation's Dominion Network from 1944 to 1962; and also carried some programs from the U.S. NBC-Blue Network, at least as of 1939.

In 1968, the Canadian Radio-television and Telecommunications Commission (CRTC) required that all broadcasting outlets be 80% Canadian owned. Canadian Marconi's British parent had been acquired by the UK's General Electric Company earlier that year. Canadian Marconi was thus forced to put its entire broadcasting division—CFCF-TV, CFCF (AM), CFQR-FM and CFCX—on the market. A deal to sell the stations to Ernie Bushnell, owner of CJOH-DT in Ottawa, collapsed in the spring of 1971 when Bushnell was unable to secure the necessary financing. Later in 1971, Canadian Marconi agreed to sell the stations to computer and telecommunications company Multiple Access Ltd., owned by the Bronfman family.

=== CIQC (1991–1999) ===
Logo used during the CIQC news-talk years (1993–1999)

=== CINW and the move to 940 kHz (1999) ===
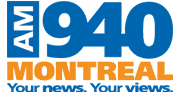
The station's logo as 940 Montreal (September 2005 - June 2008).

CIQC received permission from the Canadian Radio-television and Telecommunications Commission (CRTC) to move to 940 kHz, the former frequency of CBC owned and operated station CBM (now CBME-FM).

=== AM940 Montreal's Greatest Hits (2008) ===
On June 6, 2008, CINW announced it would drop its talk programming and move to an oldies format, effective June 14 at 5 p.m., citing difficulties operating in the Montreal market. The most recent ratings report prior to the change placed the station sixth among Montreal anglophones with a 3.8% share; nonetheless it was one of the lowest-ranked commercial English-language stations in the market (just ahead of CKGM (The Team 990), and was well behind spoken-word rivals CJAD and CBC Radio One. Live programming began at 9:40 a.m. on July 1, with new morning man Marc Denis.

=== Closure (2010) ===
On January 29, 2010, Corus announced that both CINW and CINF would cease broadcasting as of 7:00 p.m. that day, due to unsustainable ratings. Regular programming ended at 10:00 a.m. and was replaced with a repeating pre-recorded statement from general manager Mark Dickie announcing the station closure and inviting listeners to tune to sister station CFQR-FM. Broadcasting abruptly ceased — the loop announcement was cut off in mid-sentence, foregoing any official sign-off — at 7:02 p.m., ending 90 years on the air under various call signs and formats. Licences for both CINW and CINF were returned to the CRTC for cancellation, which approved the revocation on June 8, 2010.

Later that year, Cogeco acquired Corus' Quebec station assets; the sale included the transmitter sites and equipment in Kahnawake used for CINF and CINW, but not the cancelled operating licences.

== Shortwave relay ==
On December 25, 1930, the Canadian Marconi Company inaugurated experimental shortwave relay station VE9DR in order to transmit CFCF programming using a frequency of 6005 kHz and power of 4,000 watts. The relay used a Marconi transmitter which had been erected at Drummondville, Quebec. Several popular commercial stations in Canada set up shortwave stations to allow listeners in Northern Canada with few local stations to hear their broadcasts. They included CFRB Toronto, CKWX Vancouver and CFCF Montreal.

CFCF's shortwave transmitter was relocated to Montreal in 1932. In 1934, the station's call letters were changed to CFCX. In 1963, the transmitter was moved to Kahnawake, which had been the location of CFCF's AM transmitter since 1956. But with the move, the shortwave power was reduced to 500 watts. When CFCF became CIQC in 1991, the shortwave relay continued as CFCX. Later in the 1990s, CFCX began simulcasting CKOI-FM instead. In 1999, the transmitter was taken out of service due to its age and was not repaired or replaced, bringing shortwave service to an end.

== Later use of the vacated frequencies ==
=== AM 940 ===
In May 2011, Cogeco announced it planned to establish two new AM traffic information radio stations for the Montreal area, in conjunction with Transports Québec. The English language service would broadcast at CINW's former frequency of 940 kHz. Both stations were expected to sign on in the fall of 2011, with broadcast hours from 4:30 a.m. on weekdays and 6 a.m. on weekends to 1 a.m. While new licences would have been issued for both stations, the licensee for the new station was Metromedia CMR Broadcasting Inc., CINW's prior licensee. On July 8, 2011, these applications for 690 kHz and 940 kHz were withdrawn to a later date.

==== CFNV ====
On July 29, 2011, the CRTC began taking other applications for the vacant 690 and 940 frequencies, leaving Cogeco's plans for the stations in doubt. On September 7, 2011, the CRTC announced the applicants for the 940 frequency; competing against Cogeco was Paul Tietolman, the son of broadcaster Jack Tietolman, who planned to use 940 for an anglophone news-talk formatted station. On November 21, 2011, Tietolman was awarded the frequency, but for the francophone news-talk format that he originally applied for on 690.

On September 19, 2014, the CRTC gave the TTP group another year to commence broadcasting on 600 and 940. This extension was the second and, originally, final one allowed for 940, giving the station until November 21, 2015 to commence broadcasting or face cancellation of its licence, however, it was renewed for an additional year on October 30, 2015, with November 21, 2016 now set as the cut-off date.

On October 26, 2016, a test tone began being broadcast on AM 940. Call letters were also announced on that date as CFNV. The station officially began on-air testing on November 16, 2016 with music and a recorded announcement promoting the launch of the new station with a phone number to report signal interference.

=== AM 600 ===
==== CFQR ====
On June 28, 2017, a test broadcast began on AM 600 by the same owners as CFNV above. The call sign was announced as CFQR (no relation to the former CFQR-FM now CKBE-FM).

== Priority status ==
In its various incarnations, especially as CFCF, station staff often asserted that, based on its May 20, 1920 debut broadcast, their station was not only the oldest in Canada, but the first to ever make a "scheduled broadcast". This claim is not widely accepted, because there are numerous examples of earlier publicized radio broadcasts in multiple countries. This is especially true in the United States, which recorded its first regular weekly broadcasts in 1912, conducted by Charles Herrold in San Jose, California. The De Forest Radio Telephone and Telegraph Company's station, 2XG in New York City, also conducted regular broadcasts from October 1916 to April 1917, which were resumed in the fall of 1919. In addition, station PCGG in the Netherlands began weekly broadcasts on November 6, 1919, and the Marconi station in Chelmsford, England was used to broadcast two half-hour news and entertainment programmes daily from February 23 to March 6, 1920.
