= René-Lévesque Boulevard =

Street in Montreal, Quebec, Canada

Coordinates: 45°30′33″N 73°33′41″W

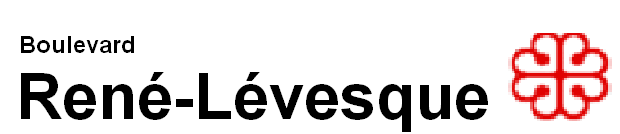

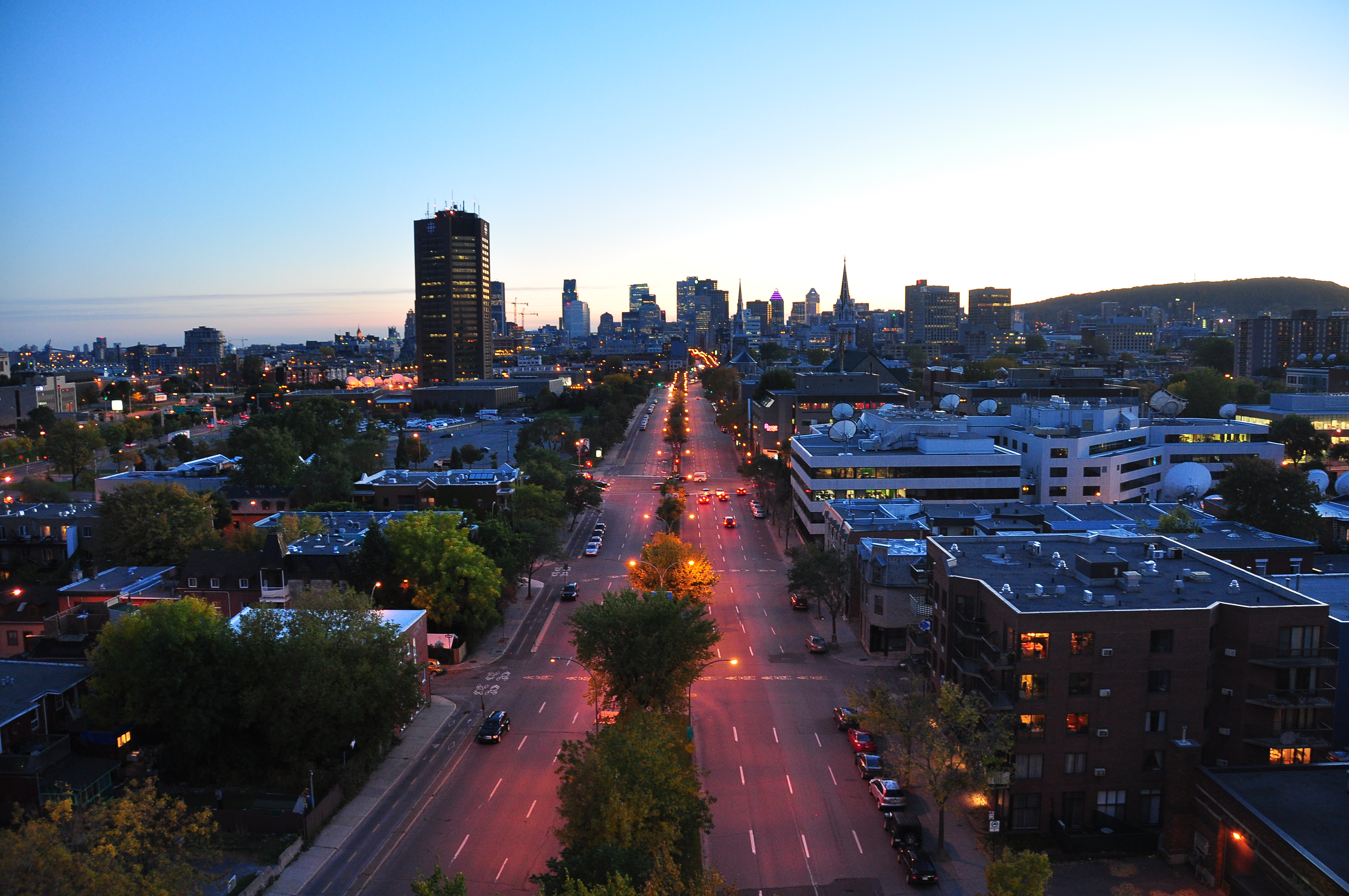
- René-Lévesque Boulevard looking toward Downtown Montreal
- Interactive map of René-Lévesque Boulevard
- Former names: Grand chemin de la Haute-Folie; Dorchester Boulevard
- Namesake: René Lévesque
- Length: 5.2 km (3.2 mi)
- Location: Montreal
- West end: Atwater Avenue, Downtown Montreal (continues west as Dorchester Boulevard)
- Major junctions: R-112; R-136
- East end: Rue Notre-Dame, Sainte-Marie

René-Lévesque Boulevard (French: Boulevard René-Lévesque), previously named Dorchester Boulevard, (Note: French: Boulevard Dorchester) is one of the main streets in Montreal, Quebec, Canada.

It is a main east–west thoroughfare passing through the downtown core in the borough of Ville-Marie. The street begins on the west at Atwater Avenue (though see below) and continues until it merges with Notre Dame Street East just east of Parthenais Street. This boulevard is named after former sovereignist Quebec Premier René Lévesque.

Much of René-Lévesque Boulevard is lined with highrise office towers. Notable structures bordering René-Lévesque Boulevard include, from west to east, the former Montreal Children's Hospital, the Canadian Centre for Architecture, E-Commerce Place, 1250 René-Lévesque, CIBC Tower, Mary, Queen of the World Cathedral, the Queen Elizabeth Hotel, Place Ville-Marie, Central Station, Telus Tower, St. Patrick's Basilica, Complexe Desjardins, Complexe Guy-Favreau, Hydro-Québec Building, UQAM and the Maison Radio-Canada. Former structures on the street include the Laurentian Hotel and a residential area razed to make way for the future YUL Condos residential project.

All of Canada's French radio and television networks are located within a few blocks of each other, making the street French Canada's media centre.

The street separates the adjacent Place du Canada and Dorchester Square.

== Dorchester ==
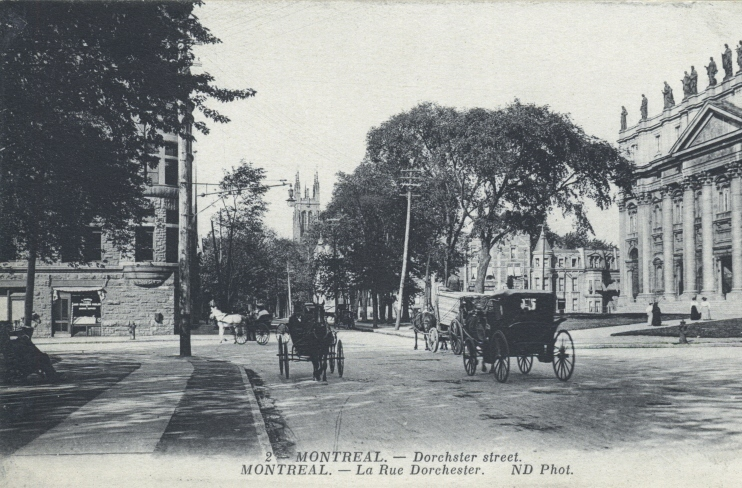
Dorchester Street, Montreal, in 1911

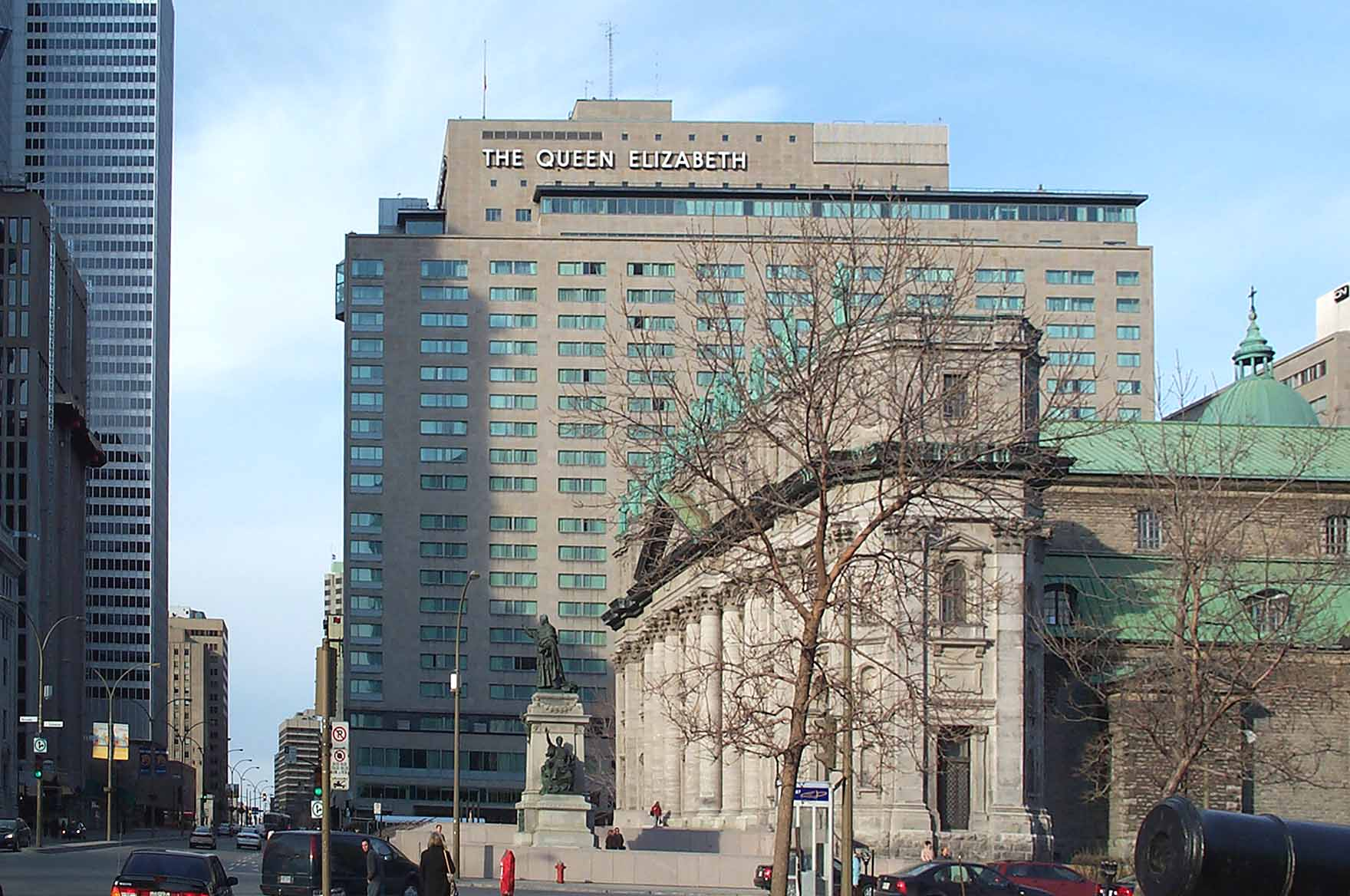
Queen Elizabeth Hotel and Mary, Queen of the World Cathedral, looking east.

From the time of its formal naming in 1844, the street was known as "Dorchester Boulevard" in honour of Guy Carleton, 1st Baron Dorchester (1724–1808), Governor of the Province of Quebec and Governor General of Canada. As part of the Golden Square Mile, several mansions once stood on this street.

Shortly after Jean Drapeau was elected mayor in 1954, his administration ordered the destruction of hundreds of buildings along Dorchester. In 1955, the street was widened into an eight-lane boulevard.

The name was changed in 1987 after the death of Quebec premier René Lévesque. A portion of the thoroughfare located in the largely anglophone city of Westmount, between Clarke and Atwater, retains the name "Boulevard Dorchester", as does a portion in the mainly French-speaking Montréal-Est, where it is known as "Rue Dorchester."

== Other streets of the same name ==
There is an unrelated street called Boulevard René-Lévesque on Nuns' Island in Verdun.
