= 1993 World Junior Ice Hockey Championships rosters =

Below are the rosters for the 1993 World Junior Ice Hockey Championships held in Sweden.

== Canada ==
Coach: Perry Pearn

Name	Pos	DOB	Club
Adrian Aucoin	D	03-07-1973	Canadian National Team
Jeff Bes	F	31-07-1973	Guelph Storm
Joël Bouchard	D	23-01-1974	Verdun Collège Français
Alexandre Daigle	F	07-02-1975	Victoriaville Tigres
Jason Dawe	F	29-05-1973	Peterborough Petes
Philippe DeRouville	G	07-08-1974	Verdun Collège Français
Martin Gendron	F	15-02-1973	Saint-Hyacinthe Laser
Chris Gratton	F	05-07-1975	Kingston Frontenacs
Ralph Intranuovo	F	07-09-1973	Sault Ste. Marie Greyhounds
Paul Kariya	F	16-10-1974	University of Maine
Nathan LaFayette	F	17-02-1973	Newmarket Royals
Martin Lapointe	F	12-09-1973	Laval Titan
Manny Legace	G	04-02-1973	Niagara Falls Thunder
Dean McAmmond	F	15-06-1973	Prince Albert Raiders
Rob Niedermayer	F	28-12-1974	Medicine Hat Tigers
Chris Pronger	D	10-10-1974	Peterborough Petes
Mike Rathje	D	11-05-1974	Medicine Hat Tigers
Jeff Shantz	F	10-10-1973	Regina Pats
Tyler Wright	F	06-04-1973	Swift Current Broncos
Jason Smith	D	02-11-1973	Regina Pats
Jocelyn Thibault	G	12-01-1975	Sherbrooke Faucons
Brent Tully	D	26-03-1974	Peterborough Petes
Darcy Werenka	D	13-05-1973	Lethbridge Hurricanes
