= Line (ice hockey) =

Formation of ice hockey players

In ice hockey, a line is a group of forwards who play in a group, or "shift", during a game.

A complete forward line consists of a left wing, a centre, and a right wing, while a pair of defencemen who play together are called "partners". Typically, an NHL team dresses twelve forwards along four lines and three pairs of defencemen, though some teams elect to dress a seventh defenceman, or a thirteenth forward. In ice hockey, players are substituted "on the fly," meaning a substitution can occur even in the middle of play as long as proper protocol is followed (under typical ice hockey rules, the substituting player cannot enter the ice until the substituted player is within a short distance of the bench and not actively playing the puck); substitutions can still be made during stoppages. Usually, coordinated groups of players (called linemates) are substituted simultaneously in what are called line changes. Linemates may change throughout the game at the coach's say.

Ice hockey is one of only a handful of sports (gridiron football and basketball being the two most prominent others) that allows for unlimited free substitution and uses a system of multiple sets of players for different situations. Because of the use of lines in hockey, ice hockey teams have relatively large rosters compared to the number of players on the ice (23 for a typical NHL team, with 20 active on game day and six on the ice at any given time). Only gridiron football has a larger relative roster size (the NFL has 53 players, 46 active on gameday, 11 on the field).

== Types of line ==
=== Forward ===
- The first line is usually composed of the best offensive players on the team. Teams rely heavily on this line, which generates the bulk of the team's scoring. These players often see the highest number of minutes among forwards in a game and are usually part of the team's starting lineup.
- The second line is generally composed of second-tier offensive players, and helps by adding supplementary offense to that generated by the first line while contributing more two-way play than the offensively-focused scoring line. Higher end (typically first line) players may be put on the second line to spread scoring across the lineup, making a team more difficult for opponents to defend against. This frequently happens when a team has two high-end players who play the same position.
- The third line is often called the checking line, and is generally made up of more defensively oriented forwards and grinders. This line is often played against an opponent's first or second lines in an effort to reduce their scoring, and physically wear them down. The third line adds less offense than the first or second lines, but generally more than the fourth.
- The fourth line is often called the "energy line," both because their shifts give other players a chance to rest, and because their physically oriented play is said to give their teammates an emotional boost. Traditionally it was composed of journeymen with limited scoring potential, but strong physical play and, as often as possible, strong skating abilities. With the least amount of ice time, they tend to play in short bursts rather than pace themselves. Pests and enforcers usually play the fourth line, as do centres whose primary skill is winning faceoffs. The fourth line can be a checking line. With the rise of analytics, the traditional fourth line of enforcers is being replaced by more skilled players.

=== Defence ===
Defencemen operate in pairs rather than trios. The top pairing consists of the two strongest defenders on the team, and may play up to 30 minutes per game. Offensive defencemen may be placed on any pairing, while "stay-at-home" defenders typically play on the third pair. Coaches may also choose to pair a more offensively-minded defender with a more defensive player.

== Special teams ==
- A penalty kill unit is a specialized group of four or three players employed when a team is shorthanded due to a penalty. As the name describes, this is a primarily defensive unit meant to prevent the opposing team from scoring during their power play.
- A power play unit is a specialized group of five or four players when the opposing team has been called for a penalty and is shorthanded. This unit is a primarily offensive group of players meant to take advantage of scoring against the shorthanded opposing team.
