= Garth Butcher =

Canadian ice hockey player (born 1963)

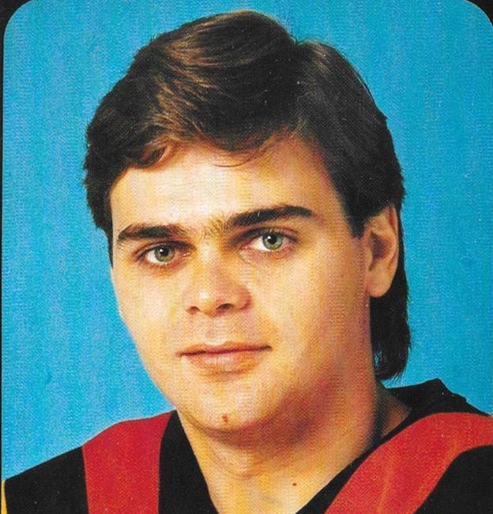
- Butcher in 1984 card
- Born: January 8, 1963 (age 63) Regina, Saskatchewan, Canada
- Height: 6 ft 0 in (183 cm)
- Weight: 200 lb (91 kg; 14 st 4 lb)
- Position: Defence
- Shot: Right
- Played for: Vancouver Canucks; St. Louis Blues; Quebec Nordiques; Toronto Maple Leafs
- National team: Canada
- NHL draft: 10th overall, 1981; Vancouver Canucks
- Playing career: 1981–1995
Medal record
World Junior Championships
Gold medal – first place	1982	Canada

Garth Butcher (born January 8, 1963) is a Canadian former professional ice hockey defenceman. Butcher was a top prospect as a junior player and was a member of the first Canadian team to win gold at the world junior championship. Butcher played in the National Hockey League (NHL) for 14 seasons, from 1981–82 to 1994–95, mostly with the Vancouver Canucks.

== Playing career ==
=== Junior career ===
Butcher played with Saskatchewan Junior Hockey League teams in his hometown of Regina prior to moving up to the Western Hockey League, late in the 1979–80 season. Regina was co-hosting the 1980 Memorial Cup, and Butcher joined the WHL's Regina Pats for 13 regular-season games, 9 playoff games (winning the President's Cup and for the round-robin games at the Memorial Cup tournament. At 16 years of age, he was the Pats' youngest player.

During his next two seasons of junior, he accumulated 178 points and over 500 minutes in penalties, and was selected to the WHL's All-Star team in 1980–81. "His blend of talent and grit made him one of the top prospects" for the 1981 NHL entry draft. The Hockey News draft preview issue ranked Butcher as the No. 3 overall prospect and No. 1 WHL prospect in a draft that included future Hall of Famers Dale Hawerchuk, Grant Fuhr and Al MacInnis (who was drafted five spots after Butcher). On draft day, the Vancouver Canucks selected him 10th overall.

==== International gold ====
The next season, Butcher led all WHL defencemen with 92 points. Butcher was also a member of the first Canadian junior team to win a gold medal at the World Junior Ice Hockey Championships.

The tourney was being played in North America (Minnesota was the host jurisdiction) and it was Canada's first attempt at putting together a true, national, junior team. The team was noted for its defence and allowed a tourney-low 14 goals in seven games under national team coach Dave King.

For his part, Butcher scored one goal and three assists while recording no penalty minutes. Butcher recalls the gold-medal experience as his "greatest thrill" in hockey.

=== Professional career ===
==== Vancouver Canucks ====
Shortly after the international tourney, he was called up to the NHL to join the Canucks for five regular season games (debuting January 7, 1982) and one play-off game in the team's run to the Stanley Cup Final.

After splitting part of the next season with the Canucks' farm team, the Fredericton Express, Butcher became a staple of the NHL club's defence. Butcher became known for his defensive prowess and never matched his offensive numbers from junior. His best offensive season was 1987–88 when he recorded a modest 23 points (6 goals and 17 assists).

Goals came so rarely for Butcher at the NHL level that, in the 1988–89 season, his first goal of the season came in the playoffs (the game six winning goal in the near-upset of the Calgary Flames).

Butcher played an aggressive style and earned a reputation as a classic "needler" who distracted opponents or provoked them into taking penalties. In 1989, Gerard Gallant of the Detroit Red Wings was suspended five games for retaliating and deliberately attempting to injure Butcher.

Butcher was not a prolific fighter but was still regarded as a tough, capable opponent. His December 26, 1988, fight with Mark Hunter of the Calgary Flames resulted in Hunter missing part of the season due to a concussion.

In his near-decade and 610 games with the Canucks, Butcher amassed a club-record 1,668 penalty minutes, a mark eventually broken by Gino Odjick. His perseverance and battling attitude earned him the respect of the Canuck fans and team. After his retirement, the Canucks organization placed him in the sixth spot on their list of the 50 Greatest Canucks of all time.

==== St. Louis Blues ====
Late in the 1990–91 season, the St. Louis Blues were in first place overall and GM Ron Caron was looking to improve the team's defence for the playoffs. On March 5, 1991, at the trade deadline, Caron traded four players and 1992 fifth-round pick (Brian Loney) to Vancouver for Butcher and Dan Quinn, a small but skilled centre. Butcher was the key player for the Blues, with Quinn added due to the Canucks' hard negotiating. The Blues traded away Geoff Courtnall, Robert Dirk, Sergio Momesso, and Cliff Ronning – who as a group invigorated the Canucks for a number of years and eventually helped their new team advance to the 1994 Stanley Cup Final.

The Butcher trade helped the Canucks but cost Butcher's new team dearly. Trading away such depth cost the Blues a second scoring line behind Brett Hull and Adam Oates. As a result, the trade was blamed for the Blues' defeat at the hands of the Minnesota North Stars in the second round of the playoffs. (The Stars would make it all the way to the Finals). Quinn was gone from the team shortly after the playoff disappointment. The Butcher trade (together with a later lopsided deal favoring the Canucks) was regarded by media and fans as one of the top 5 heartbreakers for the St. Louis Blues.

Butcher was expected to provide leadership. He was named team captain, but a broken left foot cost him the end of the 1991–92 NHL season and the start of the playoffs. After the Blues were eliminated, Butcher was selected to the national team for the 1992 Ice Hockey World Championships. He played three games and scored a goal. The team placed eighth.

Butcher played in the NHL All-Star Game in 1993, but as an injury replacement for Jeff Brown. The same year, Butcher scored a rare goal, the game-winner, against the Toronto Maple Leafs in game three of the 1993 Norris Division Finals.

==== Towards retirement ====
As Butcher aged, he became a less important player but still figured in trades for star players.

Midway through the 1993–94 NHL season, on January 23, 1994, Butcher was one of three St. Louis players traded to the Quebec Nordiques for star defenceman Steve Duchesne. In 1994, Butcher was moved from Quebec to the Toronto Maple Leafs as part of the multi-player blockbuster trade of Mats Sundin for Wendel Clark.

Butcher was released by Toronto on October 2, 1995. He was unable to catch on with another team and chose to retire at age 32.

Butcher played in 897 career NHL games, scoring 48 goals and 158 assists for 206 points, as well as adding 2,302 penalty minutes for the Canucks, Blues, Nordiques, and Maple Leafs.

== Off-ice activities ==
During his career with the Canucks, Butcher worked as a car salesman and leasing agent in Vancouver during the off-seasons. Butcher eventually owned and operated several businesses, including a bar in Mississauga, Ontario. A woman at the bar accused Butcher of sexual assault after an after-work sexual encounter in 2002. In court, Butcher testified that the sex was consensual, and he was acquitted by a jury in 2004.

Butcher lives in Bellingham, Washington, and is director of hockey operations for the Bellingham Sportsplex. He is also active in coaching for the Whatcom Warriors Amateur Hockey Association.

Butcher married the sister of former NHL players Doug Morrison and Mark Morrison. Butcher has five children; his son, Matt, was drafted by the Vancouver Canucks in the 2005 NHL entry draft.

== Awards and achievements ==
- 1981: WHL First All-Star Team
- 1982: national team selection for World Junior Championships (gold medal)
- 1982: WHL First All-Star Team
- 1992: national team selection for World Championships (eighth place)
- 1993: NHL All-Star Game: (injury replacement for Jeff Brown)

=== Vancouver Canucks ===
- 1986–87: Hume Award (Unsung Hero) and Most Valuable Teammate
- 1988–89: Tracker Award (Most Aggressive)
- Most assists by a defenceman in one game (4 vs. Toronto on Nov. 29, 1990)
- Season lead in penalty minutes: 1984–85 (152), 1985–86 (188), 1986–87 (207), 1987–88 (285), 1988–89 (227)
- Left Vancouver in 1991 with franchise record (since broken) for career penalty minutes (1,668)

=== St. Louis Blues ===
- Season lead in penalty minutes: 1992–93 (211)

== Career statistics ==
=== Regular season and playoffs ===
			Regular season					Playoffs
Season	Team	League	GP	G	A	Pts	PIM	GP	G	A	Pts	PIM
1978–79	Regina Pat Canadians	AAHA	22	4	22	26	72	—	—	—	—	—
1979–80	Regina Blues	SJHL	51	15	31	46	236	—	—	—	—	—
1979–80	Regina Pats	WHL	13	0	4	4	20	9	0	0	0	45
1979–80	Regina Pats	M-Cup	—	—	—	—	—	3	0	1	1	0
1980–81	Regina Pats	WHL	69	9	77	86	230	11	5	17	22	60
1981–82	Vancouver Canucks	NHL	5	0	0	0	9	1	0	0	0	0
1981–82	Regina Pats	WHL	65	24	68	92	318	19	3	17	20	95
1982–83	Vancouver Canucks	NHL	55	1	13	14	104	3	1	0	1	2
1982–83	Kamloops Jr. Oilers	WHL	5	4	2	6	4	6	4	8	12	16
1983–84	Vancouver Canucks	NHL	28	2	0	2	34	—	—	—	—	—
1983–84	Fredericton Express	AHL	25	4	13	17	43	6	0	2	2	19
1984–85	Vancouver Canucks	NHL	75	3	9	12	152	—	—	—	—	—
1984–85	Fredericton Express	AHL	3	1	0	1	11	—	—	—	—	—
1985–86	Vancouver Canucks	NHL	70	4	7	11	188	3	0	0	0	0
1986–87	Vancouver Canucks	NHL	70	5	15	20	207	—	—	—	—	—
1987–88	Vancouver Canucks	NHL	80	6	17	23	285	—	—	—	—	—
1988–89	Vancouver Canucks	NHL	78	0	20	20	227	7	1	1	2	22
1989–90	Vancouver Canucks	NHL	80	6	14	20	205	—	—	—	—	—
1990–91	Vancouver Canucks	NHL	69	6	12	18	257	—	—	—	—	—
1990–91	St. Louis Blues	NHL	13	0	4	4	32	13	2	1	3	54
1991–92	St. Louis Blues	NHL	68	5	15	20	189	5	1	2	3	16
1992–93	St. Louis Blues	NHL	84	5	10	15	211	11	1	1	2	20
1993–94	St. Louis Blues	NHL	43	1	6	7	76	—	—	—	—	—
1993–94	Quebec Nordiques	NHL	34	3	9	12	67	—	—	—	—	—
1994–95	Toronto Maple Leafs	NHL	45	1	7	8	59	7	0	0	0	8
NHL totals			897	48	158	206	2,302	50	6	5	11	122

=== International ===
Year	Team	Event	GP	G	A	Pts	PIM
1982	Canada	WJC	7	1	3	4	0
1992	Canada	WC	3	1	0	1	4

== See also ==
- List of NHL players with 2,000 career penalty minutes

Awards and achievements
Preceded by Rick Lanz	Vancouver Canucks first-round draft pick 1981	Succeeded by Michel Petit
Sporting positions
Preceded by Scott Stevens	St. Louis Blues captain 1991–92	Succeeded by Brett Hull
