= Stu Grimson =

Canadian ice hockey player (born 1965)

- Born: May 20, 1965 (age 61) Vancouver, British Columbia, Canada
- Height: 6 ft 6 in (198 cm)
- Weight: 240 lb (109 kg; 17 st 2 lb)
- Position: Left wing
- Shot: Left
- Played for: Calgary Flames; Chicago Blackhawks; Mighty Ducks of Anaheim; Detroit Red Wings; Hartford Whalers; Carolina Hurricanes; Los Angeles Kings; Nashville Predators
- NHL draft: 186th overall, 1983; Detroit Red Wings; 143rd overall, 1985; Calgary Flames
- Playing career: 1988–2002

Stuart Grimson (born May 20, 1965) is a Canadian former professional ice hockey player. Grimson played in the National Hockey League (NHL) from 1989 to 2002. During this time, he played for the Calgary Flames, Chicago Blackhawks, Mighty Ducks of Anaheim, Detroit Red Wings, Hartford Whalers/Carolina Hurricanes, Los Angeles Kings, and Nashville Predators. Grimson was born in Vancouver, British Columbia, but grew up in Kamloops, British Columbia.

== Playing career ==
Grimson was known as an enforcer, with over 2,000 penalty minutes in his career. His stature, his reputation as a fighter, and a play on his surname combined to earn him the nickname "the Grim Reaper." In his final season, in Nashville, he suffered from post-concussion syndrome and was forced to retire after a fight with Georges Laraque of the Edmonton Oilers. He had already been suffering effects before that bout, and even admitted he once blacked out in the middle of a fight.

His final NHL game was on December 12, 2001, and he officially announced his retirement on June 1, 2003.

== Personal life ==
Despite his fearsome reputation on the ice, Grimson won respect as an intelligent and articulate man off it. He became a born-again Christian in the early 1990s and led the NHL's Christian Fellowship ("Jesus was no wimp", Grimson said in one interview).

After retiring, Grimson finished his undergraduate degree and began law school. He completed his Juris Doctor degree in December 2005 at the University of Memphis Law School. He was In-House Counsel for the National Hockey League Players' Association (2006–2008) and then worked for the Nashville law firm of Kay, Griffin, Enkema & Brothers, PLLC (2008–2012). He worked as a Color Analyst for the Nashville Predators on Fox Sports South and the team's flagship network, 102.5 The Game, through the 2016–17 season.

Grimson appeared in a 2001 commercial spot for The Foundation for a Better Life. It begins with on-ice game action leading up to an intermission. While in the locker room with the team, Grimson receives a phone call. It is revealed that the caller is Grimson's young daughter, who asks him to sing "Itsy Bitsy Spider". He reluctantly complies, much to the amusement of his teammates. Grimson replies "Hey, it's my girl! You know, my daughter?" The commercial showed a softer side of Grimson as a good family man.

During an October 6, 2011, edition of Hockey Night In Canada, Don Cherry accused Grimson, along with Chris Nilan and Jim Thomson, of being 'pukes' and 'hypocrites' for supposedly making a living as an enforcers and now complaining about it. Grimson, by then a licensed attorney, indicated that he considered legal action against Don Cherry on behalf of himself, Chris Nilan and Jim Thomson citing Cherry's claims as "baseless and slanderous". After an apology on Hockey Night in Canada by Cherry, Grimson reconsidered his lawsuit against Cherry stating that "This is a decision for Canadians. The CBC is your network; you pay for it. And you hold the network to certain standards and values."

In 2019, Grimson released his memoir, The Grim Reaper: The Life and Career of a Reluctant Warrior.

Grimson has four children with his ex-wife Pam; Erin, Hannah, Kristjan and Jayne.

In 2018, Stu married Jennifer Ives Grimson, an entrepreneur and investor. They live in Nashville, Tennessee.

== Career statistics ==
=== Regular season and playoffs ===
			Regular season					Playoffs
Season	Team	League	GP	G	A	Pts	PIM	GP	G	A	Pts	PIM
1982–83	Regina Pats	WHL	48	0	1	1	105	5	0	0	0	14
1983–84	Regina Pats	WHL	63	8	8	16	131	21	0	1	1	29
1984–85	Regina Pats	WHL	71	24	32	56	248	8	1	2	3	14
1985–86	University of Manitoba	CWUAA	12	7	4	11	113	—	—	—	—	—
1986–87	University of Manitoba	CWUAA	29	8	8	16	67	—	—	—	—	—
1987–88	Salt Lake Golden Eagles	IHL	37	9	5	14	268	—	—	—	—	—
1988–89	Salt Lake Golden Eagles	IHL	72	9	18	27	397	14	2	3	5	86
1988–89	Calgary Flames	NHL	1	0	0	0	5	—	—	—	—	—
1989–90	Salt Lake Golden Eagles	IHL	62	8	8	16	319	4	0	0	0	8
1989–90	Calgary Flames	NHL	3	0	0	0	17	—	—	—	—	—
1990–91	Chicago Blackhawks	NHL	35	0	1	1	183	5	0	0	0	46
1991–92	Indianapolis Ice	IHL	5	1	1	2	17	—	—	—	—	—
1991–92	Chicago Blackhawks	NHL	54	2	2	4	234	14	0	1	1	10
1992–93	Chicago Blackhawks	NHL	78	1	1	2	193	2	0	0	0	4
1993–94	Mighty Ducks of Anaheim	NHL	77	1	5	6	199	—	—	—	—	—
1994–95	Mighty Ducks of Anaheim	NHL	31	0	1	1	110	—	—	—	—	—
1994–95	Detroit Red Wings	NHL	11	0	0	0	37	11	1	0	1	26
1995–96	Detroit Red Wings	NHL	56	0	1	1	128	2	0	0	0	0
1996–97	Detroit Red Wings	NHL	1	0	0	0	0	—	—	—	—	—
1996–97	Hartford Whalers	NHL	75	2	2	4	218	—	—	—	—	—
1997–98	Carolina Hurricanes	NHL	82	3	4	7	204	—	—	—	—	—
1998–99	Mighty Ducks of Anaheim	NHL	73	3	0	3	158	3	0	0	0	30
1999–00	Mighty Ducks of Anaheim	NHL	50	1	2	3	116	—	—	—	—	—
2000–01	Los Angeles Kings	NHL	72	3	2	5	235	5	0	0	0	4
2001–02	Nashville Predators	NHL	30	1	1	2	76	—	—	—	—	—
NHL totals			729	17	22	39	2,113	42	1	1	2	120

== Filmography ==
Year	Title	Role	Notes
2022	The Simpsons	Himself (voice)	Episode: "Top Goon"

== See also ==
- List of NHL players with 2000 career penalty minutes
