= Steve Bégin =

Canadian ice hockey player (born 1978)

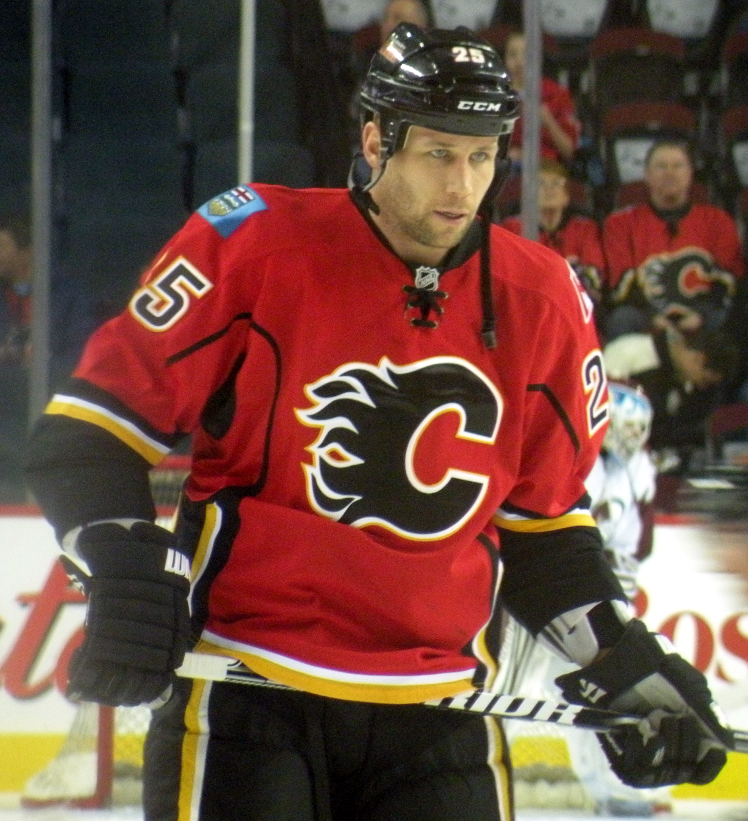
- Born: June 14, 1978 (age 48) Trois-Rivières, Quebec, Canada
- Height: 5 ft 11 in (180 cm)
- Weight: 195 lb (88 kg; 13 st 13 lb)
- Position: Centre
- Shot: Left
- Played for: Calgary Flames; Montreal Canadiens; Dallas Stars; Boston Bruins; Nashville Predators
- NHL draft: 40th overall, 1996; Calgary Flames
- Playing career: 1997–2013

Joseph Denis Stéphan Bégin (French pronunciation: [stefɑ̃ beʒɛ̃]); born June 14, 1978) is a Canadian former professional ice hockey player who was a centre in 13 National Hockey League (NHL) seasons. He was a second-round selection of the Calgary Flames, 40th overall, in the 1996 NHL entry draft, and played with the Flames, Montreal Canadiens, Dallas Stars, Boston Bruins and Nashville Predators in his NHL career. After missing a full season due to injury, Bégin made a successful comeback by rejoining the Flames in 2012–13 before another injury forced his retirement.

Bégin played junior hockey with the Val-d'Or Foreurs where he was a member of their Quebec Major Junior Hockey League (QMJHL) championship winning team in 1998. He also led the Saint John Flames to the American Hockey League (AHL)'s Calder Cup championship in 2001 and won the Jack A. Butterfield Trophy as the most valuable player of the playoffs. Bégin adopted a role as a defensive specialist and grinder in an NHL career where he has played over 500 games.

== Personal life ==
A native of Trois-Rivières, Quebec, Bégin grew up in a single-parent household, raised by his father Gilles on a welfare income. Gilles worked as a landscaper, while Steve often helped his father at work until he was 18 years old.

Introduced to hockey by family friends, Bégin began playing at age six and was an offensively minded player in his minor hockey years. He wore second-hand equipment as his father struggled to pay the costs of hockey, but from a young age expressed his confidence he would make it to the National Hockey League (NHL). As a youth, he played in the 1992 Quebec International Pee-Wee Hockey Tournament with a minor ice hockey team from Francheville, Quebec.

Bégin moved to Val-d'Or, Quebec, to play junior hockey, where he met his wife, Amélie. The couple have two daughters and eventually settled in Montreal.

== Playing career ==
=== Junior ===
Bégin played three years for the Val-d'Or Foreurs of the Quebec Major Junior Hockey League (QMJHL) between 1995 and 1998, where he scored 44 goals and recorded 117 points to go along with 520 penalty minutes in 157 games. The Calgary Flames selected him with their second round pick, 40th overall, in the 1996 NHL entry draft. Following the 1996–97 QMJHL season, the Flames assigned Bégin to their American Hockey League (AHL) affiliate, the Saint John Flames, with whom he recorded two assists in four playoff games.

Bégin earned a spot with the Calgary Flames to begin the 1997–98 season. He made his NHL debut on October 1, 1998, against the Detroit Red Wings, and appeared in five games before he was returned to Val-d'Or for the remainder of the season on October 28. The Foreurs went on to win the President's Cup as QMJHL champions.

Bégin made his lone appearance with the Canadian national team that season, playing and serving as an alternate captain with the junior team at the 1998 World Junior Hockey Championship. He had no points and ten penalty minutes in seven games in what was an eighth-place finish for Canada.

=== Calgary Flames ===
After graduating from junior hockey, Bégin played his first full professional season with Saint John in 1998–99. He had 20 points and 156 penalty minutes in 73 games, and scored his first professional goal on October 8, 1998, against the St. John's Maple Leafs. Bégin spent the majority of the next two seasons in Saint John, but made sporadic appearances with Calgary. He appeared in 13 games with the Flames in 1999–2000 and scored his first NHL goal on February 12, 2000, on goaltender Sean Burke of the Phoenix Coyotes. He played in four NHL games in 2000–01 while enjoying the best statistical season of his professional career in Saint John, scoring 28 points in 58 games. In the playoffs, Bégin led Saint John to the Calder Cup championship. He scored 17 points in 19 games and was named the recipient of the Jack A. Butterfield Trophy as the most valuable player of the playoffs. His 17 points were fourth best in the AHL, and 10 goals were second.

Bégin played his first full NHL season in 2001–02, appearing in 53 games for the Flames where he scored 7 goals and 12 points to go along with 79 penalty minutes. He had 4 goals and 4 assists in 50 games for Calgary in 2002–03. He left Calgary in the off-season as he was part of a three team trade on July 3, 2003. Bégin was dealt to the Buffalo Sabres along with Chris Drury in exchange for Rhett Warrener and Steve Reinprecht, whom the Sabres acquired from the Colorado Avalanche to complete the deal.

=== Montreal Canadiens ===
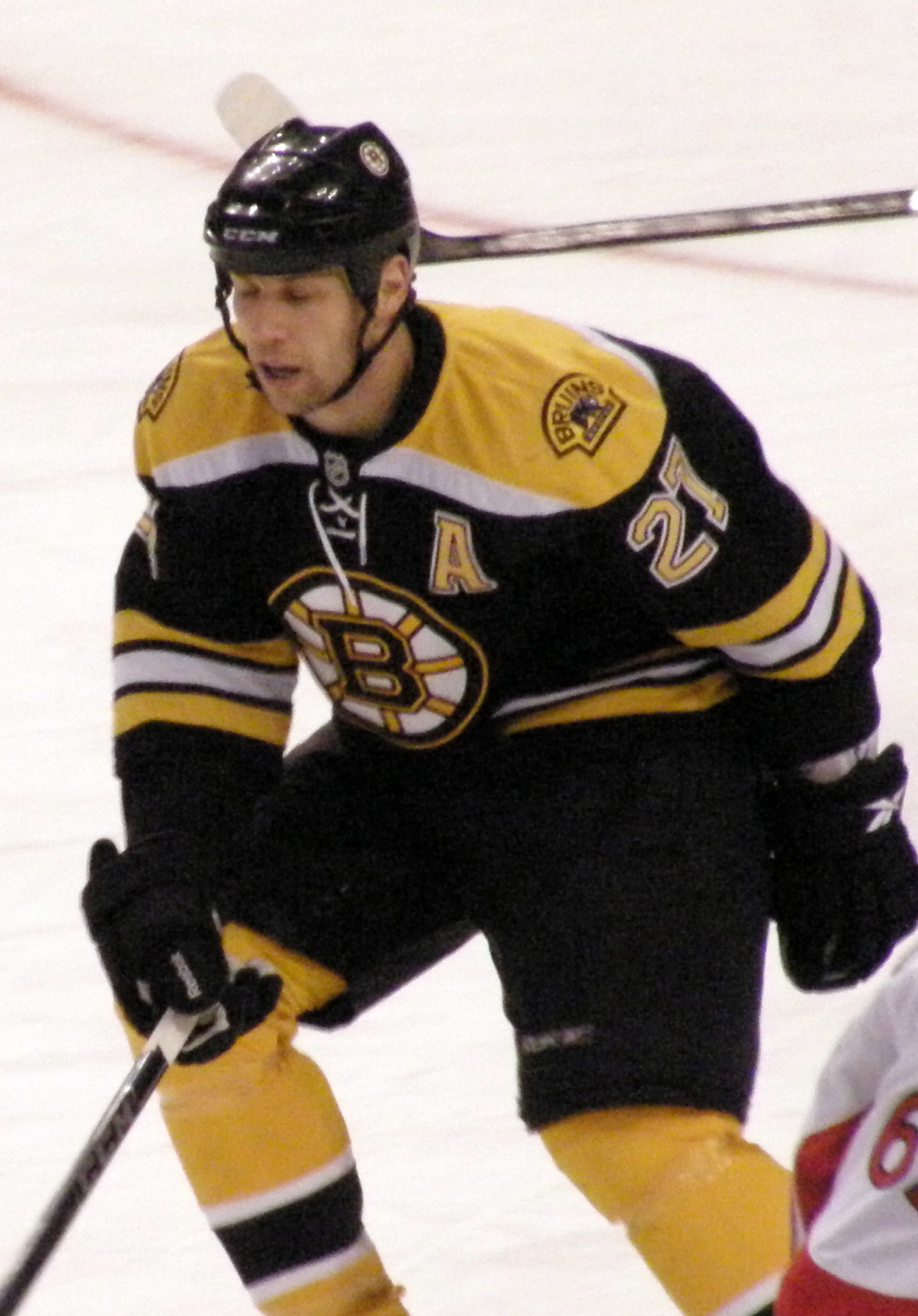
Bégin as a member of the Boston Bruins.

Bégin was promoted by Buffalo coach Lindy Ruff as a hard working, "blue collar" type player that Sabres fans would enjoy watching, but he never played a game with the Sabres. He was exposed to the waiver draft prior to the start of the 2003–04 NHL season and claimed by the Montreal Canadiens. He played an energy role for the Canadiens, and scored 10 goals for Montreal in 52 games.

After playing through injury in 2003–04, Bégin underwent shoulder surgery that caused him to miss five months of playing time. When he returned to action, an ongoing labour dispute in the NHL led to his being assigned to the AHL's Hamilton Bulldogs in February 2005, with whom he was immediately counted upon to play a leadership role. Bégin returned to the Canadiens in 2005–06 and set career highs in goals (11), points (23) and penalty minutes (113). The Montreal media named him the recipient of the Jacques-Beauchamp Molson Trophy, a team award given to a Canadiens' player who played a "dominant role" with the team, without earning any other honours. Plagued by injuries, Bégin missed time due to rib and shoulder injuries. He appeared in only 52 games in 2006–07 and 44 games in 2007–08 and scored 18 points combined over the two seasons.

=== Dallas, Boston and Nashville ===
Bégin was increasingly left out of the Canadiens' playing lineup in 2008–09, and after being sat out of the lineup for five consecutive games, expressed a desire to be traded if the team had no use for his services. The Canadiens obliged, completing a deal on February 26, 2009, that sent him to the Dallas Stars in exchange for defenceman Doug Janik. Stars' general manager Les Jackson promoted Bégin's qualities as a checking-line forward: "Steve is a gritty, honest player with a very strong work ethic. He's good on the penalty kill and he is a competitor in every sense of the word." Bégin had 12 points in 62 games combined between Montreal and Dallas.

Leaving Dallas following the season, Bégin signed a one-year contract with the Boston Bruins for the 2009–10 season. He played in 77 games for Boston, the most of any single season in his career, and recorded 14 points. He scored his first career playoff goal, in his 30th playoff game, against the Philadelphia Flyers. The Bruins opted not to re-sign the 32-year-old Bégin, due both to their salary cap constraints and a desire to build a younger lineup.

Without a contract, Bégin remained a free agent as the 2010–11 season began. He eventually signed a one-year contract with the Nashville Predators on October 22, 2010, but was assigned to their AHL affiliate, the Milwaukee Admirals. Bégin spent the majority of the season in Milwaukee and appeared in only two games with Nashville.

=== Return to Calgary ===
Plagued by a hip injury, Bégin was again left a free agent prior to the 2011–12 season. He signed a professional tryout offer with the Vancouver Canucks, but was released by the team during the pre-season. Bob Hartley, coach of ZSC Lions in the Swiss National League A offered him a spot on their team. Though he had already scheduled surgery to repair his hip, Bégin was willing to put it off to play in Switzerland, but was convinced by Hartley to complete the procedure. His recovery prevented Bégin from playing anywhere during the season.

"It's great to put this jersey on. I worked hard this past year. Sometimes, I was twice a day in the gym. I skated five to six times a week. I wanted to be ready. I didn’t want to miss my chance. I knew this would be the last call for me, the last chance I would get. And I made it, so it pays off at the end."

— Bégin explains his emotions after earning a spot with the Flames in 2013.

When Hartley took over as the Flames' head coach prior to the 2012–13 NHL season, he offered Bégin a tryout in Calgary. Bégin's work ethic during the team's training camp prior to the lockout-shortened season earned him a contract with the Flames, who believed he could serve as a penalty killer and energy player. Over two years since his last NHL game, Bégin returned to the league, and appeared in his 500th game on February 24, 2013, against the Coyotes. He appeared in 36 games for the Flames, scoring four goals and adding four assists. In recognition of his successful comeback, the Calgary chapter of the Professional Hockey Writers' Association named him the Flames' nominee for the Bill Masterton Memorial Trophy for dedication and perseverance.

Bégin was signed to a one-year, AHL contract with the Abbotsford Heat for the 2013–14 season. He was unable to play due to another injury and, after doctors informed him that he would miss the entire season, Bégin announced his retirement from professional hockey on January 16, 2014.

== Playing style ==
Bégin's father taught his son that his best chance of making a career in hockey was as a defensive specialist and impressed on him the need for a strong work ethic. He was raised to follow role players like Mario Tremblay, Guy Carbonneau and Bob Gainey rather than stars such as Guy Lafleur or Wayne Gretzky. Bégin has played the majority of his career as a grinder, willing to play a physical game. His style often results in bruises and injuries, a part of the game he relishes. Speaking of his comeback with the Flames in 2013, he said, "What I missed the most was the pain of playing hockey. The pain from blocking shots, getting hit, hitting people... I missed it a lot." That attitude impressed his coaches; Bob Hartley argued that players like Bégin are a valuable commodity: "Players with the commitment of Steve Bégin, I really believe that there's not enough (of them) in the NHL. I always admired the way that he played. I look at the spirit, the leadership. Pretty amazing what he's done for us."

== Career statistics ==
=== Regular season and playoffs ===
			Regular season					Playoffs
Season	Team	League	GP	G	A	Pts	PIM	GP	G	A	Pts	PIM
1993–94	Trois-Rivières Estacades	QMAAA	8	0	1	1	6	—	—	—	—	—
1994–95	Cap-de-la-Madeleine Estacades	QMAAA	35	9	15	24	48	3	0	0	0	2
1995–96	Val-d'Or Foreurs	QMJHL	64	13	23	36	218	13	1	3	4	33
1996–97	Val-d'Or Foreurs	QMJHL	58	13	33	46	229	10	0	3	3	8
1996–97	Saint John Flames	AHL	—	—	—	—	—	4	0	2	2	6
1997–98	Val-d'Or Foreurs	QMJHL	35	18	17	35	73	15	2	12	14	34
1997–98	Calgary Flames	NHL	5	0	0	0	23	—	—	—	—	—
1998–99	Saint John Flames	AHL	73	11	9	20	156	7	2	0	2	18
1999–00	Saint John Flames	AHL	47	13	12	25	99	—	—	—	—	—
1999–00	Calgary Flames	NHL	13	1	1	2	18	—	—	—	—	—
2000–01	Saint John Flames	AHL	58	14	14	28	109	19	10	7	17	18
2000–01	Calgary Flames	NHL	4	0	0	0	21	—	—	—	—	—
2001–02	Calgary Flames	NHL	51	7	5	12	79	—	—	—	—	—
2002–03	Calgary Flames	NHL	50	3	1	4	51	—	—	—	—	—
2003–04	Montreal Canadiens	NHL	52	10	5	15	41	9	0	1	1	10
2004–05	Hamilton Bulldogs	AHL	21	10	3	13	20	4	0	2	2	8
2005–06	Montreal Canadiens	NHL	76	11	12	23	113	2	0	0	0	2
2006–07	Montreal Canadiens	NHL	52	5	5	10	46	—	—	—	—	—
2007–08	Montreal Canadiens	NHL	44	3	5	8	48	12	0	3	3	8
2008–09	Montreal Canadiens	NHL	42	6	4	10	27	—	—	—	—	—
2008–09	Dallas Stars	NHL	20	1	1	2	15	—	—	—	—	—
2009–10	Boston Bruins	NHL	77	5	9	14	53	13	1	0	1	10
2010–11	Milwaukee Admirals	AHL	36	3	3	6	30	13	3	4	7	12
2010–11	Nashville Predators	NHL	2	0	0	0	4	—	—	—	—	—
2012–13	Calgary Flames	NHL	36	4	4	8	22	—	—	—	—	—
AHL totals			235	51	41	92	414	47	15	15	30	62
NHL totals			524	56	52	108	561	36	1	4	5	30

=== International ===
Year	Team	Event	GP	G	A	Pts	PIM
1998	Canada	WJC	7	0	0	0	10

== Awards and honours ==
Award	Year
Quebec Major Junior Hockey League
President's Cup champion	1997–98
American Hockey League
Calder Cup champion	2000–01
Jack A. Butterfield Trophy; Most valuable player of the playoffs	2001
NHL team awards
Jacques-Beauchamp Molson Trophy; Montreal – Unheralded "dominant" player	2005–06
