= Karl Dykhuis =

Canadian ice hockey player (born 1972)

- Born: July 8, 1972 (age 54) Sept-Îles, Quebec, Canada
- Height: 6 ft 3 in (191 cm)
- Weight: 214 lb (97 kg; 15 st 4 lb)
- Position: Defence
- Shot: Left
- Played for: Chicago Blackhawks; Philadelphia Flyers; Tampa Bay Lightning; Montreal Canadiens
- National team: Canada
- NHL draft: 16th overall, 1990; Chicago Blackhawks
- Playing career: 1991–2006

Karl Sebastien Dykhuis (/ˈdaɪkhaʊs/ DYKE-hows; born July 8, 1972) is a Canadian former professional ice hockey defenceman who played 12 seasons in the National Hockey League (NHL) for the Chicago Blackhawks, Philadelphia Flyers, Tampa Bay Lightning and Montreal Canadiens.

As a youth, he played in the 1985 and 1986 Quebec International Pee-Wee Hockey Tournaments with a minor ice hockey team from Sept-Îles, Quebec.

During the 2004–05 NHL lockout, Dykhuis played for the Amsterdam Bulldogs in the Netherlands.

== Awards and achievements ==
- QMJHL All-Rookie Team (1989)
- QMJHL Defensive Rookie of the Year (1989)
- QMJHL First All-Star Team (1990)
- 1991 World Junior U20 Gold Medalist

== Transactions ==
- Feb. 16 1995: Traded to Philadelphia Flyers by Chicago Blackhawks for Bob Wilkie and Philadelphia's fifth round choice (Kyle Calder) in 1997 Entry Draft
- Aug. 20 1997: Traded to Tampa Bay Lightning by Philadelphia Flyers with Mikael Renberg for Philadelphia's first round choices (previously acquired) in 1998 (Simon Gagne), 1999: (Maxime Ouellet), 2000 (Justin Williams) and 2001 (later traded to Ottawa - Ottawa selected Tim Gleason) Entry Drafts
- Dec. 28, 1998: Traded to Philadelphia Flyers by Tampa Bay Lightning for Petr Svoboda
- Oct. 20, 1999: Traded to Montreal Canadiens by Philadelphia Flyers for cash
- Jan. 3, 2005: Signed as a free agent by Amsterdam (Netherlands)
- Aug. 25, 2005: Signed as a free agent by Mannheim (Germany)

== Career statistics ==
=== Regular season and playoffs ===
| | | | Regular season | | | | | Playoffs |
| Season | Team | League | GP | G | A | Pts | PIM | GP | G | A | Pts | PIM |
|---|---|---|---|---|---|---|---|---|---|---|---|---|
| 1987–88 | Lac-St-Jean Cascades | QMAAA | 37 | 2 | 12 | 14 | 25 | 2 | 0 | 1 | 1 | 2 |
| 1988–89 | Hull Olympiques | QMJHL | 63 | 2 | 29 | 31 | 59 | 9 | 1 | 9 | 10 | 6 |
| 1989–90 | Hull Olympiques | QMJHL | 69 | 10 | 45 | 55 | 119 | 11 | 2 | 5 | 7 | 2 |
| 1990–91 | Canada | Intl | 37 | 2 | 9 | 11 | 16 | — | — | — | — | — |
| 1990–91 | Longueuil Collège Français | QMJHL | 3 | 1 | 4 | 5 | 6 | 8 | 2 | 5 | 7 | 6 |
| 1991–92 | Canada | Intl | 19 | 1 | 2 | 3 | 16 | — | — | — | — | — |
| 1991–92 | Chicago Blackhawks | NHL | 6 | 1 | 3 | 4 | 4 | — | — | — | — | — |
| 1991–92 | Verdun Collège Français | QMJHL | 29 | 5 | 19 | 24 | 59 | 17 | 0 | 12 | 12 | 14 |
| 1992–93 | Chicago Blackhawks | NHL | 12 | 0 | 5 | 5 | 0 | — | — | — | — | — |
| 1992–93 | Indianapolis Ice | IHL | 59 | 5 | 18 | 23 | 76 | 5 | 1 | 1 | 2 | 8 |
| 1993–94 | Indianapolis Ice | IHL | 73 | 7 | 25 | 32 | 132 | — | — | — | — | — |
| 1994–95 | Indianapolis Ice | IHL | 52 | 2 | 21 | 23 | 63 | — | — | — | — | — |
| 1994–95 | Hershey Bears | AHL | 1 | 0 | 0 | 0 | 0 | — | — | — | — | — |
| 1994–95 | Philadelphia Flyers | NHL | 33 | 2 | 6 | 8 | 37 | 15 | 4 | 4 | 8 | 14 |
| 1995–96 | Philadelphia Flyers | NHL | 82 | 5 | 15 | 20 | 101 | 12 | 2 | 2 | 4 | 22 |
| 1996–97 | Philadelphia Flyers | NHL | 62 | 4 | 15 | 19 | 35 | 18 | 0 | 3 | 3 | 2 |
| 1997–98 | Tampa Bay Lightning | NHL | 78 | 5 | 9 | 14 | 110 | — | — | — | — | — |
| 1998–99 | Tampa Bay Lightning | NHL | 33 | 2 | 1 | 3 | 18 | — | — | — | — | — |
| 1998–99 | Philadelphia Flyers | NHL | 45 | 2 | 4 | 6 | 32 | 5 | 1 | 0 | 1 | 4 |
| 1999–2000 | Philadelphia Flyers | NHL | 5 | 0 | 1 | 1 | 6 | — | — | — | — | — |
| 1999–2000 | Montreal Canadiens | NHL | 67 | 7 | 12 | 19 | 40 | — | — | — | — | — |
| 2000–01 | Montreal Canadiens | NHL | 67 | 8 | 9 | 17 | 44 | — | — | — | — | — |
| 2001–02 | Montreal Canadiens | NHL | 80 | 5 | 7 | 12 | 32 | 12 | 1 | 1 | 2 | 8 |
| 2002–03 | Montreal Canadiens | NHL | 65 | 1 | 4 | 5 | 34 | — | — | — | — | — |
| 2003–04 | Montreal Canadiens | NHL | 9 | 0 | 0 | 0 | 2 | — | — | — | — | — |
| 2003–04 | Hamilton Bulldogs | AHL | 54 | 5 | 17 | 22 | 61 | 5 | 1 | 0 | 1 | 8 |
| 2004–05 | Amsterdam Bulldogs | NLD | 5 | 1 | 1 | 2 | 36 | 7 | 1 | 3 | 4 | 39 |
| 2005–06 | Adler Mannheim | DEL | 52 | 4 | 11 | 15 | 44 | — | — | — | — | — |
| NHL totals | | | 644 | 42 | 91 | 133 | 495 | 62 | 8 | 10 | 18 | 50 |
| IHL totals | | | 184 | 14 | 64 | 78 | 271 | 5 | 1 | 1 | 2 | 8 |

=== International ===
| Year | Team | Event | GP | G | A | Pts | PIM |
|---|---|---|---|---|---|---|---|
| 1991 | Canada | WJC | 7 | 0 | 3 | 3 | 2 |
| 1992 | Canada | WJC | 7 | 0 | 0 | 0 | 8 |
| Junior totals | | | 14 | 0 | 3 | 3 | 10 |

| Preceded by Adam Bennett | Chicago Blackhawks first-round draft pick 1990 | Succeeded by Dean McAmmond |
