= Longueuil Collège Français (QMJHL) =

- City: Longueuil, Quebec
- League: QMJHL
- Operated: 1989 to 1991
- Home arena: Colisée Jean Béliveau

Franchise history
- 1969 to 1985: Quebec Remparts
- 1988 to 1991: Longueuil Collège Français
- 1991 to 1994: Verdun Collège Français

The Longueuil Collège-Français were a major junior ice hockey team based in Longueuil, Quebec, Canada. They played three seasons, from 1988 to 1991, in the Quebec Major Junior Hockey League (QMJHL). The team played its home games out of the 2,400-seat Colisée Jean Béliveau.

The team was a revival of the Quebec Remparts franchise which last played in the QMJHL during the 1984–85 season. Following the 1990–91 QMJHL season, the franchise was relocated to Verdun, Quebec, becoming the Verdun Collège Français.

== NHL alumni ==
- Joel Bouchard
- Donald Brashear
- Philippe DeRouville
- Karl Dykhuis
