= List of NHL players with 2,000 career penalty minutes =

This is a list of ice hockey players who have accumulated at least 2,000 penalties in minutes (PIMs) in the National Hockey League (NHL) through the end of the 2025–26 NHL regular season.

Legend key	Condition
Player	Active NHL player
Team	Active player's team
Player	In the Hockey Hall of Fame

== 3,000 or more PIMs ==
Rank	Player	Teams	Seasons	Games	PIMs
1	Tiger Williams	Toronto, Vancouver, Detroit, Los Angeles, Hartford	14	962	3,971
2	Dale Hunter	Quebec, Washington, Colorado Avalanche	19	1,407	3,565
3	Tie Domi	Toronto, N.Y. Rangers, Winnipeg (original), Toronto	16	1,020	3,515
4	Marty McSorley	Pittsburgh, Edmonton, Los Angeles, Pittsburgh, Los Angeles, NY Rangers, San Jose, Edmonton, Boston	17	961	3,381
5	Bob Probert	Detroit, Chicago	16	935	3,300
6	Rob Ray	Buffalo, Ottawa	15	900	3,207
7	Craig Berube	Philadelphia, Toronto, Calgary, Washington, Philadelphia, Washington, N.Y. Islanders, Calgary	17	1,054	3,149
8	Tim Hunter	Calgary, Quebec, Vancouver, San Jose	16	815	3,146
9	Chris Nilan	Montreal, N.Y. Rangers, Boston, Montreal	13	688	3,043

== 2,500-2,999 PIMs ==
Rank	Player	Team(s)	Seasons	Games	PIMs
10	Rick Tocchet	Philadelphia, Pittsburgh, Los Angeles, Boston, Washington, Phoenix, Philadelphia	18	1,144	2,972
11	Pat Verbeek	New Jersey, Hartford, N.Y. Rangers, Dallas, Detroit, Dallas	20	1,424	2,905
12	Chris Chelios	Montreal, Chicago, Detroit, Atlanta Thrashers	26	1,651	2,891
13	Dave Manson	Chicago, Edmonton, Winnipeg/Phoenix, Montreal, Chicago, Dallas, Toronto, Dallas	16	1,103	2,792
14	Scott Stevens	Washington, St. Louis, New Jersey	22	1,635	2,785
15	Donald Brashear	Montreal, Vancouver, Philadelphia, Washington, N.Y. Rangers	16	1,025	2,634
16	Willi Plett	Atlanta/Calgary Flames, Minnesota North Stars, Boston	13	834	2,572
17	Gino Odjick	Vancouver, N.Y. Islanders, Philadelphia, Montreal	12	605	2,567
18	Matthew Barnaby	Buffalo, Pittsburgh, Tampa Bay, N.Y. Rangers, Colorado Avalanche, Chicago, Dallas	14	834	2,562
19	Gary Roberts	Calgary, Carolina, Toronto, Florida, Pittsburgh, Tampa Bay	21	1,224	2,560
20	Chris Neil	Ottawa	15	1,026	2,522
21	Joe Kocur	Detroit, N.Y. Rangers, Vancouver, Detroit	15	820	2,519
22	Ken Daneyko	New Jersey	20	1,283	2,516

== 2,499-2,250 PIMs ==
Rank	Player	Team(s)	Seasons	Games	PIMs
23	Brendan Shanahan	New Jersey, St. Louis, Hartford, Detroit, N.Y. Rangers, New Jersey	21	1,524	2,489
24	Scott Mellanby	Philadelphia, Edmonton, Florida, St. Louis, Atlanta Thrashers	21	1,431	2,479
25	Basil McRae	Quebec, Toronto, Detroit, Quebec, Minnesota North Stars, Tampa Bay, St. Louis, Chicago	16	576	2,457
26	Ulf Samuelsson	Hartford, Pittsburgh, N.Y. Rangers, Detroit, Philadelphia	16	1,080	2,453
27	Jeff Odgers	San Jose, Boston, Colorado Avalanche, Atlanta Thrashers	12	821	2,364
28	Jay Wells	Los Angeles, Philadelphia, Buffalo, N.Y. Rangers, St. Louis, Tampa Bay	18	1,098	2,359
29	Shayne Corson	Montreal, Edmonton, St. Louis, Montreal, Toronto, Dallas	19	1,156	2,357
30	Lyle Odelein	Montreal, New Jersey, Phoenix, Columbus, Chicago, Dallas, Florida, Pittsburgh	16	1,056	2,316
31	Bryan Marchment	Winnipeg (original), Chicago, Hartford, Edmonton, Tampa Bay, San Jose, Colorado Avalanche, Toronto, Calgary	17	926	2,307
32	Garth Butcher	Vancouver, St. Louis, Quebec, Toronto	14	897	2,302
33	Shane Churla	Hartford, Calgary, Minnesota/Dallas, Los Angeles, N.Y. Rangers	11	488	2,301
34	Kelly Buchberger	Edmonton, Atlanta Thrashers, Los Angeles, Phoenix, Pittsburgh	18	1,182	2,297
35	Dave Schultz	Philadelphia, Los Angeles, Pittsburgh, Buffalo	9	535	2,294
36	Laurie Boschman	Toronto, Edmonton, Winnipeg (original), New Jersey, Ottawa	14	1,009	2,263

== 2,249-2,000 PIMs ==
Rank	Player	Team(s)	Seasons	Games	PIMs
37	Brad May	Buffalo, Vancouver, Phoenix, Vancouver, Colorado, Anaheim, Toronto, Detroit	18	1,041	2,248
38	Ken Baumgartner	Los Angeles, N.Y. Islanders, Toronto, Anaheim, Boston	12	696	2,244
39	Kevin Dineen	Hartford, Philadelphia, Hartford/Carolina, Ottawa, Columbus	19	1,188	2,229
40	Rob Ramage	Colorado Rockies, St. Louis, Calgary, Toronto, Minnesota North Stars, Tampa Bay, Montreal, Philadelphia	15	1,044	2,226
41	Keith Tkachuk	Winnipeg/Phoenix, St. Louis, Atlanta Thrashers, St. Louis	18	1,201	2,219
42	Bryan Watson	Montreal, Detroit, Montreal, Oakland, Pittsburgh, St. Louis, Detroit, Washington	16	878	2,212
43	Steve Smith	Edmonton, Chicago, Calgary	16	804	2,139
44	Stu Grimson	Calgary, Chicago, Anaheim, Detroit, Hartford/Carolina, Anaheim, Los Angeles, Nashville	14	729	2,113
45	Terry O'Reilly	Boston	14	891	2,095
46	Al Secord	Boston, Chicago, Toronto, Philadelphia, Chicago	12	766	2,093
47	Zdeno Chara	N.Y. Islanders, Ottawa, Boston, Washington	24	1,680	2,085
48	Ronnie Stern	Vancouver, Calgary, San Jose	12	638	2,077
49	Mick Vukota	N.Y. Islanders, Tampa Bay, Montreal	11	573	2,071
50	Gord Donnelly	Quebec, Winnipeg (original), Buffalo, Dallas	12	554	2,069
51	Luke Richardson	Toronto, Edmonton, Philadelphia, Columbus, Toronto, Tampa Bay, Ottawa	21	1,417	2,055
52	Mike Foligno	Detroit, Buffalo, Toronto, Florida	15	1,018	2,049
53	Phil Russell	Chicago, Atlanta/Calgary, New Jersey, Buffalo	15	1,016	2,038
54	Kris King	Detroit, N.Y. Rangers, Winnipeg/Phoenix, Toronto, Chicago	14	849	2,030
55	Kelly Chase	St. Louis, Hartford, Toronto, St. Louis	11	458	2,017
56	Harold Snepsts	Vancouver, Minnesota North Stars, Detroit, Vancouver, St. Louis	17	1,033	2,009
