= Donald Brashear =

American-born Canadian ice hockey player (born 1972)

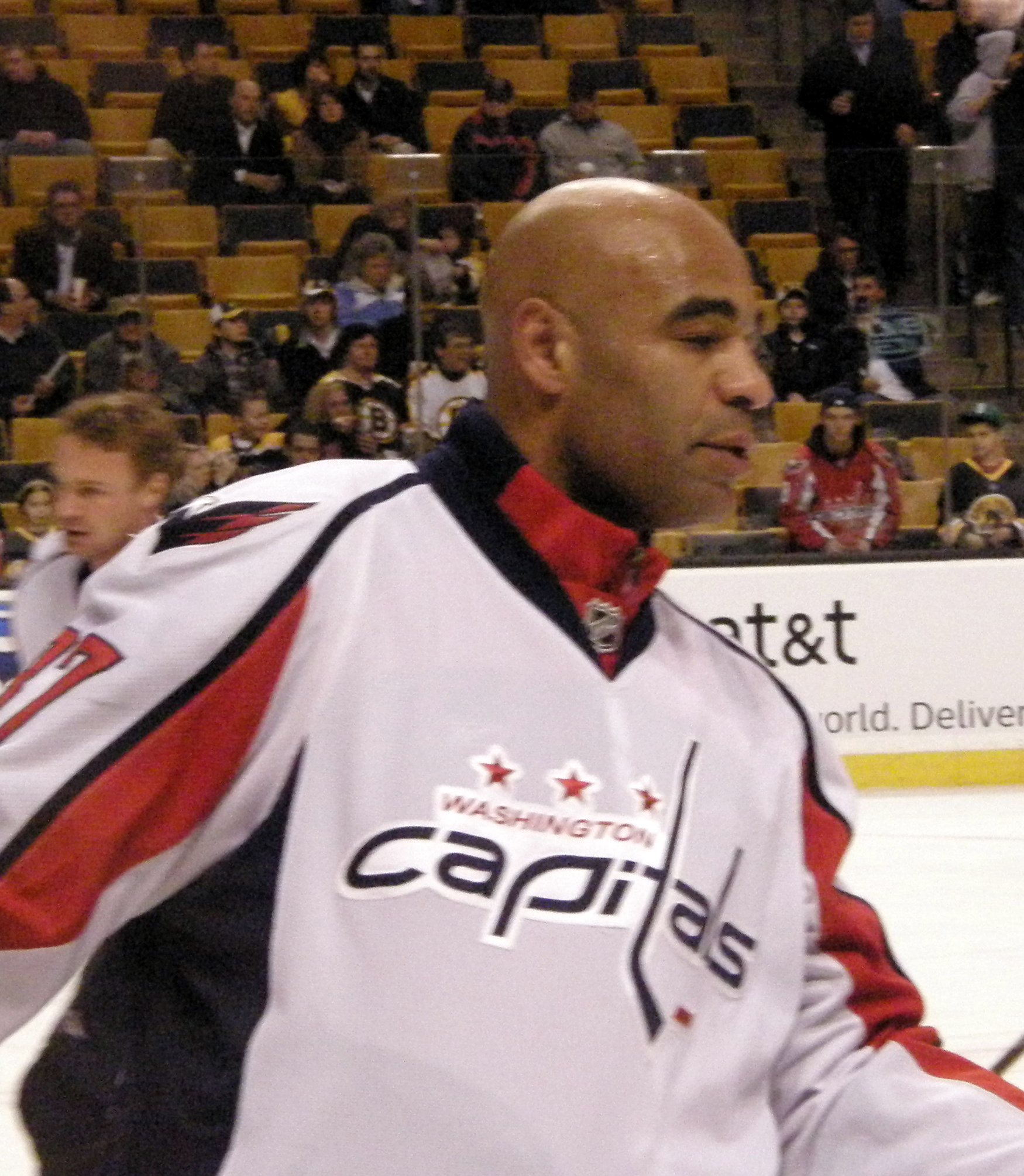
- Brashear with the Washington Capitals during the 2008–09 season.
- Born: January 7, 1972 (age 54) Bedford, Indiana, U.S.
- Height: 6 ft 3 in (191 cm)
- Weight: 240 lb (109 kg; 17 st 2 lb)
- Position: Left wing
- Shot: Left
- LNAH team Former teams: Jonquiere Marquis; Montreal Canadiens; Vancouver Canucks; Philadelphia Flyers; Washington Capitals; New York Rangers; Modo Hockey
- National team: United States
- NHL draft: Undrafted
- Playing career: 1992–2024

Donald Brashear (born January 7, 1972) is an American-born Canadian former professional hockey player. He played for five organizations in the National Hockey League (NHL) over a 16-year career, in which he played the role of an enforcer.

He was among the NHL leaders in penalty minutes for six seasons, while finishing his career 15th all-time in penalty minutes. He remains the Vancouver Canucks' all-time single-season leader in penalty minutes, which he set in the 1997–98 season.

He was involved in one of the most publicized incidents of on-ice violence in NHL history during the 1999–2000 season, when he was slashed in the head by Marty McSorley.

== Early life ==
Brashear was born in Bedford, Indiana, but moved to Val-Bélair, Quebec, his mother's family city, as a child.

Brashear is the youngest of three children born to an American father, Johnny Brashear, and Nicole Gauthier, who was mainly of French-Canadian descent, in Bedford, Indiana. His father was an alcoholic who relentlessly abused his family, including slashing Donald with belts and electrical cords. On one occasion, when Donald was only six months old, he picked him up and hurled him through a window. Nicole, afraid that Johnny might kill her, left the family and returned to Canada. Later, she came back to take the children but left Donald to live with his father for another four years, until Donald's paternal grandmother sent him to Canada. Nicole later stated that she left him behind because her future husband was prejudiced and wanted to avoid having another mixed-race child in the house.

Brashear eventually moved in with his mother and stepfather in Loretteville, Quebec. Because of his stepfather's racist attitude, he suffered further abuse in his new surroundings; for instance, he was forced to sleep with a garbage bag tied around his waist to keep him from wetting the bed and was verbally berated for not being able to tie his shoes. His mother finally decided to give him up to foster care, due in part because of what she called "mental problems" from the abuse he had suffered, and because he did not accept her as his mother. Brashear lived in two different foster homes that sent him away since the families believed he was a "little too much to handle."

At the age of eight, Brashear moved to Val-Bélair, Quebec, and settled into a new foster home. Once there, he began playing hockey with his new siblings. To help pay for hockey, Brashear sold baked bread and garbage bags door-to-door, and later became a paper boy. He played in the 1984, 1985 and 1986 Quebec International Pee-Wee Hockey Tournaments with three separate minor ice hockey teams from Quebec City.

== Professional career ==
=== Early career ===
Brashear was signed as a free agent by the Montreal Canadiens in 1992. He spent parts of three seasons with their American Hockey League (AHL) affiliate, the Fredericton Canadiens, before becoming a regular with Montreal at the NHL level. During the 1993–94 AHL season, he registered professional career highs of 38 goals and 66 points, along with 250 Penalty Minutes (PIMs) in 62 games. His 38 goals tied him for the team lead and the 250 PIMs led Fredericton. Brashear made his NHL debut on November 15, 1993, against the Ottawa Senators. He registered an assist in the contest, his first career NHL point. Two days later, he scored his first NHL goal in a game against the Edmonton Oilers. After playing parts of four seasons with the Canadiens, his time in Montreal ended following a heated verbal exchange with head coach Mario Tremblay during a team practice on November 9, 1996. Four days later, Brashear was traded to the Vancouver Canucks in exchange for Jassen Cullimore. Brashear finished the year with 13 points and 245 penalty minutes. Those penalty minutes were the seventh-highest in the NHL.

The following season, 1997–98, Brashear led the NHL in penalty minutes and set a Canucks franchise record with 372 PIMs, while adding 18 points. During the season, he also received a four-game suspension for delivering a blind-side punch to Ian Laperrière. Brashear stated that he hit Laperrière in retaliation to Laperrière punching Brashear's teammate Gino Odjick from behind. The 1998–99 season marked the only time in his career which he played in all 82 games, again leading the Canucks in penalty minutes and finishing eighth in the NHL. In the 1999–2000 season, Brashear set a career-high in goals with 11, but the season was marred by one of the most published incidents of excessive violence in the modern era of hockey.

=== McSorley incident ===
During a February 21, 2000 Canucks home game against the Boston Bruins, Brashear was involved in a fight with Marty McSorley. Brashear handily won the fight and, on his way to the penalty box, taunted the Bruins' bench. Later in the game, Brashear collided with Bruins goaltender Byron Dafoe, who had to be taken off on a stretcher with a knee injury. For the rest of the game, McSorley was eager for a rematch with Brashear, who refused to fight again. With 4.6 seconds left in the game, a frustrated McSorley finally swung his stick toward Brashear's head from behind and struck him with a two-handed slash to the right temple. Brashear collapsed to the ice immediately, with his helmet falling off as the back of his head struck the ice. He suffered a seizure and the slash resulted in a grade-three concussion. Canucks goaltender Garth Snow then tried to fight McSorley, but a pile-up occurred, and Snow couldn't get at McSorley, who was ejected with 2.8 seconds left in the game. McSorley later received an indefinite suspension from the NHL and was charged with assault with a weapon as a result of his actions.

The case went to trial in British Columbia, where Brashear testified that he had no memory of the incident. McSorley testified that he tried to hit Brashear in the shoulder to start a fight with him, but missed, resulting in the head shot. McSorley was found guilty but avoided a jail sentence. He was required to complete 18 months of probation, in which he was not allowed to play in a game against Brashear. Brashear returned to play before the end of the season. McSorley, who missed the remaining 23 games of the regular season, had his suspension officially set at one year following the conviction. The incident effectively ended McSorley's career, as he never played in another NHL game. Brashear was often asked later if he ever talked with McSorley about the incident, and always responded the same way: he and McSorley had no relationship prior to it, and had no plans to ever speak to each other about what had happened.

=== Mid-career ===
Brashear played in 79 games the following season, registering 19 assists and 28 points. After leading the Canucks in penalty minutes for the previous four seasons, Brashear was traded 31 games into the 2001–02 season to the Philadelphia Flyers. The Flyers received Brashear and the Canucks' sixth-round draft pick in 2002 in exchange for Jan Hlaváč and the Flyers' third-round pick in the same draft. While splitting time between the two franchises, Brashear set a career-high in points (32) while also amassing 199 PIMs. In 2002–03, he recorded eight goals, 25 points and 161 PIMs. Thanks in part to his strong work ethic, he was awarded the Pelle Lindbergh Memorial Trophy, an annual award given to the Flyers' most improved player. During the 2003–04 season, he was among the League leaders in PIMs, registering 212, ranking him fifth overall. His PIM total was aided by his role in the most penalized game in NHL history. On March 5, 2004, the Flyers were defeating the Ottawa Senators 5–2, when with 1:45 remaining in the game, Brashear fought Ottawa enforcer Rob Ray. The fight was believed to be in retaliation to Flyers forward Mark Recchi being slashed in the face by the Senators Martin Havlát. Following Brashear's fight, five separate brawls broke out. For his role in starting the fighting, Brashear was assessed 34 PIMs, more than any other Flyer. When asked later why he started the fighting, he responded by saying, "Why wouldn’t I? Did you see the last game?"

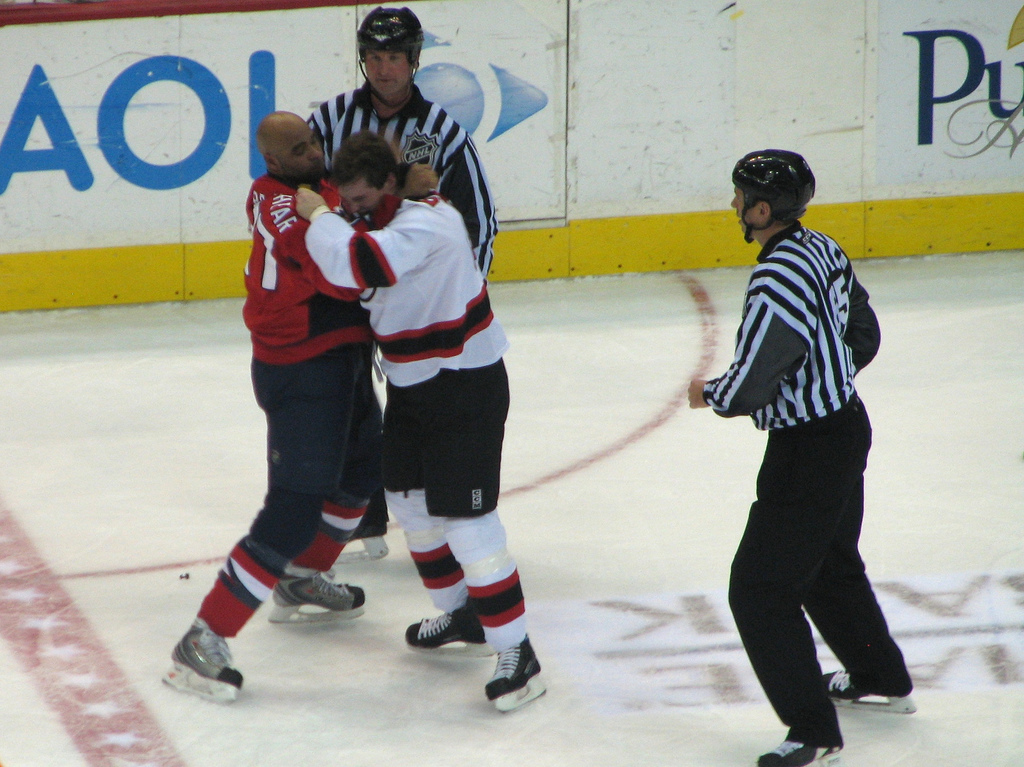
Brashear (left) fights Sheldon Brookbank

Due to the cancellation of the 2004–05 NHL season by the NHL lockout, Brashear signed with the Quebec Radio X of the semi-pro Ligue Nord-Américaine de Hockey league (LNAH). The deal was reportedly worth $300,000. He registered 18 goals and 50 points in 47 games, but was reluctant to fight and felt the league did little to protect him from players wanting to make a name for themselves against an established NHL enforcer. Brashear was suspended from the league following an incident where he continued punching a player in the face while he was lying on the ice.

Following the lockout, Brashear voiced his displeasure with the new way the League called games, stating that the NHL changed the rules to favor "superstars," and he felt that there was no longer a way to "get respect" on the ice. His statement came following a game in which he attempted to fight Darius Kasparaitis, who the Flyers believed delivered a "cheap shot" to Simon Gagné in an Olympic game earlier in the year. After Kasparaitis refused to fight Brashear at various points in the game, Brashear hit Kasparaitis with a gloved punch with 1:53 remaining in the game. Kasparaitis did not fight back and instead covered up to protect himself. Brashear was assessed 29 PIMs for the incident, including an instigator penalty. Brashear was given a one-game suspension due to new League rules for the 2005–06 season; any player given an instigator penalty in the final five minutes of regulation or overtime would receive an automatic one-game suspension. At the end of the year, he was again in the top ten (eighth) in PIMs, accumulating 166, but his offensive production dropped to a mere nine points. The Flyers opted not to re-sign the enforcer.

The Washington Capitals then signed Brashear on July 14, 2006, to a one-year, $1 million contract. The signing was to provide Alexander Ovechkin with some on-ice protection. Capitals management felt that Brashear was skilled enough not to be a liability on the team while bringing an intimidating presence. During the 2006–07 season, the Capitals decided to extend Brashear's contract, signing him to a one-year, $1.1 million contract extension. He was suspended one game by the NHL during the regular season for punching New York Rangers defenceman Aaron Ward following a fight between Brashear and Brendan Shanahan. In the game, Shanahan felt Brashear was taking liberties with Rangers captain Jaromír Jágr, and subsequently challenged Brashear to a fight. Brashear won the fight and motioned as if he was dusting off his hands. Ward then approached him and had words with Brashear, who responded by punching him in the face, earning Brashear a game misconduct for intent to injure and eventually the suspension. At season's end, his point total increased from the previous season to 13 and his 156 PIMs ranked him in the top ten (sixth) in the League for the sixth time in his career. In the 2007–08 season, Brashear played in 80 games for the Capitals, but his offensive production slipped down to eight points while registering only 119 PIMs. However, he served as one of the Capitals' alternate captains. On January 24, 2008, the Capitals once again re-signed Brashear, this time to a one-year, $1.2 million extension.

In the 2008–09 season, Brashear's point total dropped to four, his lowest total since 1995–96 while he was with the Montreal Canadiens. During the 2009 Stanley Cup playoffs, he earned a suspension for two separate on-ice incidents. On April 26, 2009, the Capitals faced the New York Rangers in Game 6 of their first-round series. In the pre-game warm-ups, Brashear shoved Rangers enforcer Colton Orr, then delivered a blind-side hit to Blair Betts mid-way through the game's first period. As a result of the hit, and a possible elbow, Betts suffered a broken orbital bone and was out indefinitely. Colin Campbell ruled that the hit was late on an unsuspecting player; he also believed it targeted the head, and as a result caused significant injury. For his actions, Brashear was given a six-game suspension by the League — one for the pre-game altercation and five for the hit on Betts.

=== Later career ===
Brashear was not given an extension during the season, and before the start of the free agency, he indicated that he would like to return to Washington, citing the prospect of winning a Stanley Cup. Brashear noted that at his age and place in his career, taking care of his family was his top priority and that money would be the deciding factor in his destination. The Capitals, however, opted not re-sign him. After initial talks with the Kontinental Hockey League (KHL)'s Vityaz Chekhov, he eventually agreed to a two-year, $2.8 million contract with the New York Rangers. At an event for season-ticket holders, Brashear was booed due to the altercation with the Rangers in the previous post-season. He set a personal milestone during the 2009–10 season by playing in his 1,000th NHL game on November 12 against the Atlanta Thrashers.

Brashear struggled in New York, however, registering just one assist and 73 PIMs in 36 games; he became unhappy with his role in New York and asked the Rangers for a trade. Following a stretch of seven-straight and 12 of 13 games where he was a healthy scratch, the Rangers placed Brashear on waivers. After clearing waivers, he was assigned to the Rangers' AHL affiliate, the Hartford Wolf Pack. Despite the demotion, Brashear was happy to be receiving steady ice time whilst in Hartford.

At the end of the season, the Rangers again placed Brashear on waivers, making him eligible for a contract buyout. Instead of buying-out his contract, however, the Rangers traded Brashear on August 2, 2010, along with Patrick Rissmiller, to the Atlanta Thrashers in exchange for centre Todd White. Atlanta then placed Brashear on waivers and bought-out the remaining year of his contract, thus making him an unrestricted free agent. At the end of the 2009–10 season, Brashear ranked 15th all-time in NHL history for penalty minutes.

After not receiving serious interest from any NHL teams, Brashear opted to return to the LNAH and signed with Sorel-Tracy GCI. He noted that his decision was based on his desire to continue playing hockey, his love for playing in the province of Quebec, and a chance to reunite with some former teammates. He was later traded during the season to Rivière-du-Loup 3L to add talent and toughness to the team. Rivière-du-Loup considered the acquisition of Brashear a "coup," noting that they could not pass up the chance to add him to the team. Late in the season, Brashear was given a suspension following his actions in a brawl against Trois-Rivières. During the melee, Brashear attacked goaltender Julien Ellis after he slashed one of Brashear's teammates who was engaged in a different fight. Brashear hit Ellis with several gloved punches before one of Ellis' teammates attempted to restrain Brashear. Brashear fought with the intervening player and after falling to the ice, Brashear continued to punch the defenceless player. He went back after the goaltender before a linesman tackled him. The suspension was originally set at eight games, but after the League met with Brashear and Rivière-du-Loup's general manager, it was reduced to five games.

In November 2014, Brashear stepped out of retirement and signed a contract with Modo Hockey of the Swedish Hockey League (SHL) for the remainder of the season. He scored once on a power play on March 16, 2015, against Vita Hästen.

Brasher returned to the LNAH for one more season in 2015–2016, but would only play 7 games before retiring. He would later return to the LNAH 8 years later in the 2023–2024 season, coming out of retirement once again, to play for the Jonquiere Marquis, getting into a fight in his first game.

== International play ==
Brashear has represented the United States on two separate occasions. He made his international debut at the 1997 World Championship, where he registered two goals and five points in eight games, helping the Americans to a sixth-place finish. He later noted that he was surprised by the invitation, but felt that it allowed him to show he could play other roles besides being an enforcer. He played for the U.S. again the following year at the World Championship, playing in six games and accumulating ten penalty minutes as the Americans finished in 12th place.

== Playing style ==
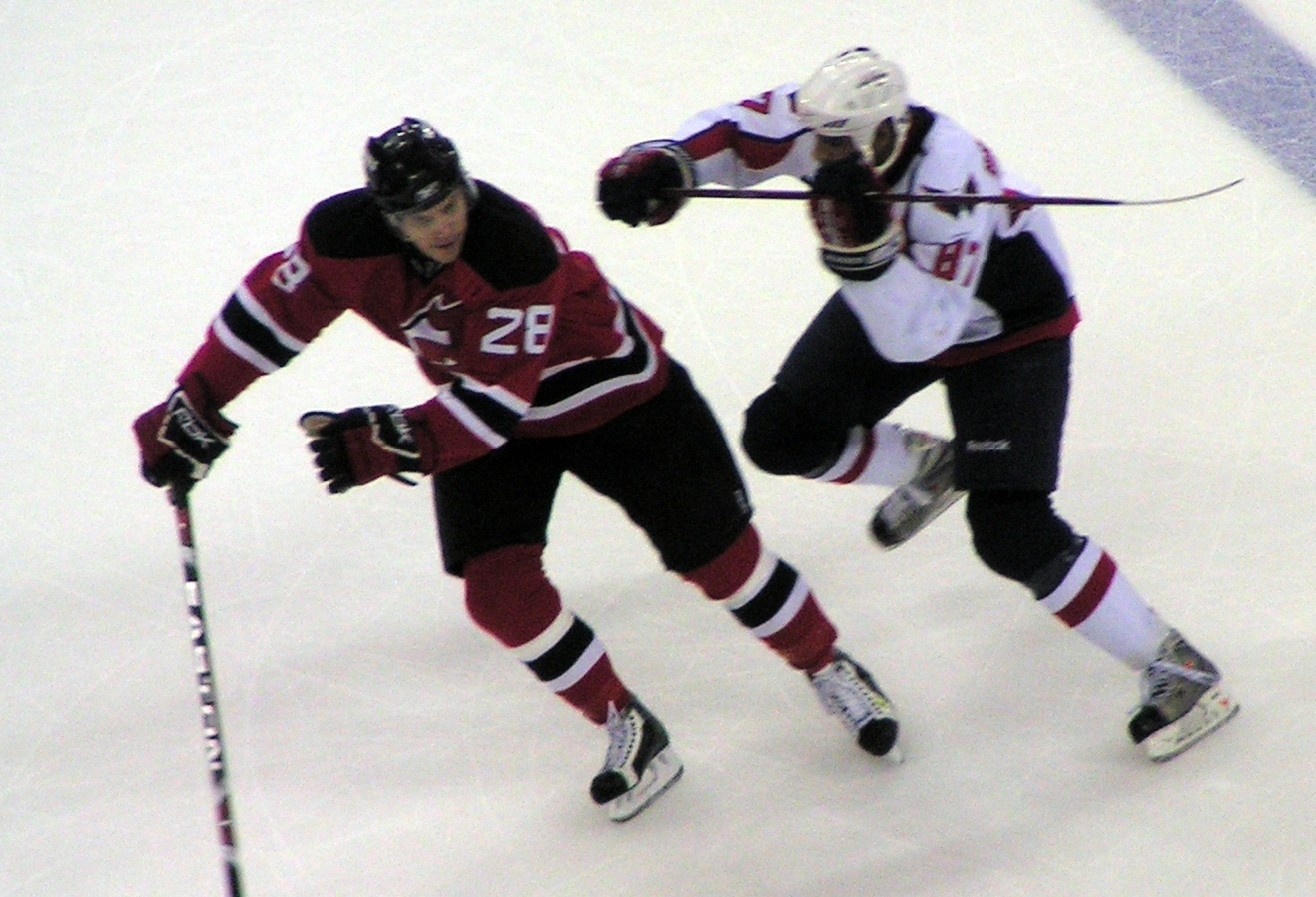
Brashear (right) delivering a cross-check to the New Jersey Devils' Anssi Salmela

Brashear was an enforcer; his role was to protect his teammates if an opponent went beyond what is considered acceptable physical play to "dirty" play or taking "cheap shots." Brashear was a tenacious forechecker, who created momentum by playing aggressively and delivering body checks, while possessing an underrated shot. Whilst fighting, he used a combination of balance and upper-body strength while taking his time trying to control his opponents before landing punches. Although left-handed by nature, he became adept at using either hand during fights. During his career in the NHL, Brashear was considered one of the toughest players in the League as well as one most feared.

In the January 2010 issue of The Hockey News, Brashear was named Enforcer of the Decade, noting that although he did not lead the NHL in number of fights, during the decade, he would have been involved in more if "he wasn't so feared." Hockey analyst Bill Clement states that "Brashear has a great sense of when his fighting skills are necessary and he picks his spots before dropping the gloves. He's excellent at understanding when a bit of pugilism might well provide the push or nudge to get some momentum going for his team." The Hockey News also assessed his skills by saying he possessed one of the most intimidating packages in the League, had a decent skating stride, and was one of the best pugilists in the NHL. He was a bit too deliberate when handling and passing the puck, and fought much less as he got older, while slowly breaking down over time.

== Mixed martial arts ==
In April 2011, Brashear signed a three-fight contract with the mixed martial arts promoter Ringside MMA. Brashear's first fight occurred on June 4, 2011, against Mathieu Bergeron at the Colisée Pepsi in Quebec City. In the fight, Brashear immediately charged Bergeron, knocking him down with a right hook. After knocking him down, he continued to hit him with hammer fists, forcing the referee to stop the fight after only 21 seconds. Brashear was officially awarded the win by TKO.

== Personal life ==
Brashear has two sons, Jordan and Jaxxon. He separated from their mother, Gabrielle Desgagne, his common-law wife, in 2007. Aside from a half-brother, he does not speak to his birth family. He credits the abuse he suffered at the hands of his father as a child for this. Jaxxon Brashear played football with the University of Ottawa Gee-Gees.

In 2000, Brashear was charged with assault following an altercation with a neighbour in the weight room of their townhouse complex in Vancouver. According to court documents, Brashear grabbed the neighbor around the throat and pushed him after the man had complained about Brashear's infant son Jordan crawling on the exercise equipment. "That's no way to show my boys how to solve their problems", Brashear said after the guilty verdict, also lamenting the fact that he had trouble controlling a violent temper inherited from his father. He would ultimately receive six months probation after pleading guilty to common assault and granted a conditional discharge.

During the 2004–05 NHL lockout, Brashear spent time as an amateur boxer, compiling a 2–1 record. Later on, he trained with former heavyweight champion Smokin' Joe Frazier In 2007, Brashear, along with some friends, founded the house building company DEC Construction. During the off-season, he works on-site performing various jobs. He has a skill for languages, speaking French and English, while also learning both Russian and Spanish. He enjoys music as well, playing the piano while learning the acoustic guitar. In 2012, Brashear was convicted of assault for a second time after an altercation in a parking lot following a March 2011, Ligue Nord-Américaine de Hockey playoff game. He was sentenced to 18 months probation and was sued for over $200,000 in damages by the victim in 2014.

Brashear's great-uncle Carl Brashear was the first African-American to be certified as a Master Diver in the United States Navy; he was the inspiration for the movie Men of Honor, in which he was portrayed by actor Cuba Gooding, Jr.

On June 5, 2019, Brashear had another brush with the law when he was arrested for allegedly breaking an apartment window. Police subsequently discovered cocaine in his possession. Brashear made a court appearance on August 12, 2019, and was scheduled to return to court in Quebec City on September 4 to face the cocaine possession charge.

In October 2019, it was reported that Brashear was working at a Tim Hortons restaurant in Quebec City owned by Pierre Sévigny.

== Career statistics ==
=== Regular season and playoffs ===
Bold indicates led league

			Regular season					Playoffs
Season	Team	League	GP	G	A	Pts	PIM	GP	G	A	Pts	PIM
1988–89	Ste-Foy Gouverneurs	QAAA	10	1	2	3	10	—	—	—	—	—
1989–90	Longueuil Collège Français	QMJHL	64	12	14	26	169	7	0	0	0	11
1990–91	Longueuil Collège Français	QMJHL	68	12	26	38	195	8	0	3	3	33
1991–92	Verdun Collège Français	QMJHL	65	18	24	42	283	—	—	—	—	—
1992–93	Fredericton Canadiens	AHL	76	11	3	14	261	5	0	0	0	8
1993–94	Fredericton Canadiens	AHL	62	38	28	66	250	—	—	—	—	—
1993–94	Montreal Canadiens	NHL	14	2	2	4	34	2	0	0	0	0
1994–95	Fredericton Canadiens	AHL	29	10	9	19	182	17	7	5	12	77
1994–95	Montreal Canadiens	NHL	20	1	1	2	63	—	—	—	—	—
1995–96	Montreal Canadiens	NHL	67	0	4	4	223	6	0	0	0	2
1996–97	Montreal Canadiens	NHL	10	0	0	0	38	—	—	—	—	—
1996–97	Vancouver Canucks	NHL	59	8	5	13	207	—	—	—	—	—
1997–98	Vancouver Canucks	NHL	77	9	9	18	**372**	—	—	—	—	—
1998–99	Vancouver Canucks	NHL	82	8	10	18	209	—	—	—	—	—
1999–2000	Vancouver Canucks	NHL	60	11	2	13	136	—	—	—	—	—
2000–01	Vancouver Canucks	NHL	79	9	19	28	145	4	0	0	0	0
2001–02	Vancouver Canucks	NHL	31	5	8	13	90	—	—	—	—	—
2001–02	Philadelphia Flyers	NHL	50	4	15	19	109	5	0	0	0	19
2002–03	Philadelphia Flyers	NHL	80	8	17	25	161	13	1	2	3	21
2003–04	Philadelphia Flyers	NHL	64	6	7	13	212	18	1	3	4	61
2004–05	Quebec Radio X	LNAH	47	18	32	50	260	8	4	6	10	42
2005–06	Philadelphia Flyers	NHL	76	4	5	9	166	1	0	0	0	0
2006–07	Washington Capitals	NHL	77	4	9	13	156	—	—	—	—	—
2007–08	Washington Capitals	NHL	80	5	3	8	119	7	1	1	2	0
2008–09	Washington Capitals	NHL	63	1	3	4	121	4	0	0	0	18
2009–10	New York Rangers	NHL	36	0	1	1	73	—	—	—	—	—
2009–10	Hartford Wolf Pack	AHL	27	2	4	6	25	—	—	—	—	—
2010–11	Riviere-du-Loup 3L	LNAH	28	17	14	31	66	—	—	—	—	—
2011–12	Riviere-du-Loup 3L	LNAH	18	3	5	8	63	—	—	—	—	—
2012–13	Riviere-du-Loup 3L	LNAH	1	0	2	2	12	—	—	—	—	—
2014–15	Modo Hockey	SHL	12	0	0	0	6
2015–16	Thetford Assurancia	LNAH	7	2	0	2	10	—	—	—	—	—
2023–24	Jonquière Marquis	LNAH	24	2	6	8	45	—	—	—	—	—
NHL totals			1,025	85	120	205	2,634	60	3	6	9	121

=== International ===
Year	Team	Event	Result	GP	G	A	Pts	PIM
1997	United States	WC	6th	8	2	3	5	8
1998	United States	WC	12th	6	0	0	0	10
**Senior totals**				**14**	**2**	**3**	**5**	**18**

All statistics taken from NHL.com

=== Mixed martial arts record ===
Res.	Record	Opponent	Method	Event	Date	Round	Time	Location	Notes
Win	1–0	(Canada) Mathieu Bergeron	TKO (punches)	Ringside MMA	June 4, 2011	1	0:21	Quebec City, Quebec, Canada	MMA debut, first win

== See also ==
- Fighting in ice hockey
- Black players in ice hockey
- List of NHL players with 1,000 games played
- List of NHL players with 2,000 career penalty minutes
