= Joël Bouchard =

Canadian ice hockey player (born 1974)

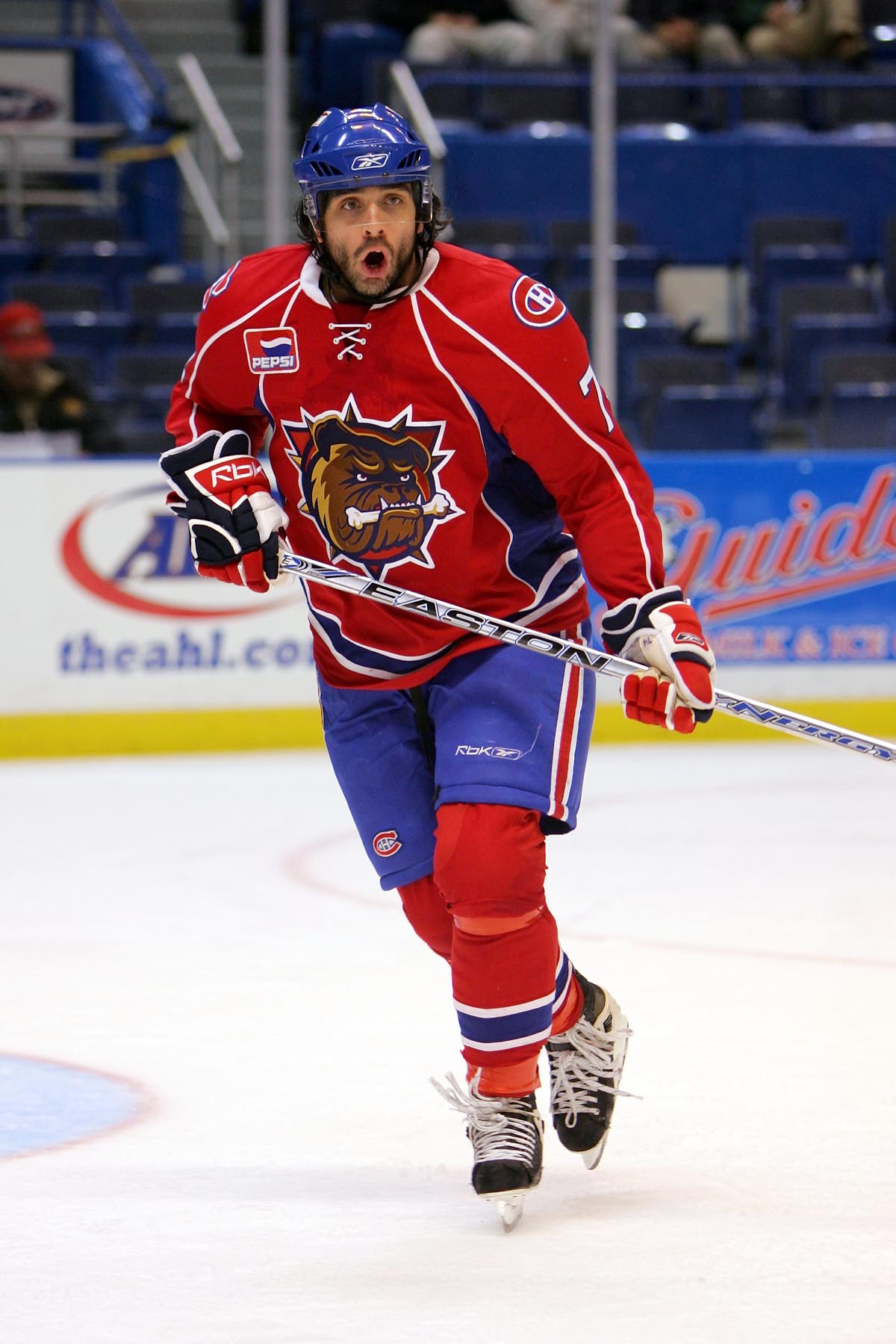
- Bouchard with the Hamilton Bulldogs in 2007
- Born: January 23, 1974 (age 51) Montreal, Quebec, Canada
- Height: 6 ft 1 in (185 cm)
- Weight: 209 lb (95 kg; 14 st 13 lb)
- Position: Defence
- Shot: Left
- Played for: Calgary Flames; Nashville Predators; Dallas Stars; Phoenix Coyotes; New Jersey Devils; New York Rangers; Pittsburgh Penguins; New York Islanders
- National team: Canada
- NHL draft: 129th overall, 1992; Calgary Flames
- Playing career: 1994–2008

Joël Bouchard (born January 23, 1974) is a Canadian professional ice hockey coach and former player who is the head coach and general manager of the Syracuse Crunch of the American Hockey League (AHL). He played in the National Hockey League (NHL) with eight teams for parts of 11 seasons between 1994 and 2008.

== Playing career ==
As a youth, Bouchard played in the 1988 Quebec International Pee-Wee Hockey Tournament with a minor ice hockey team from Montreal.

Bouchard was drafted by the Calgary Flames in the sixth round of the 1992 NHL entry draft with the 129th overall pick. Collectively, he played in the National Hockey League (NHL) for the Flames, Nashville Predators, Dallas Stars, Phoenix Coyotes, New Jersey Devils, New York Rangers, Pittsburgh Penguins, New York Islanders, as well as in the American Hockey League (AHL) for the Hamilton Bulldogs.

== Coaching career ==
After his playing career ended in 2008, Bouchard worked as an analyst for Réseau des sports (RDS). He also produced and hosted his own show called "l'Académie de Hockey McDonald." He became the head coach of the Quebec Major Junior Hockey League (QMJHL)'s Blainville-Boisbriand Armada in 2014, leading the club to two league championship finals in 2017 and 2018.

Bouchard was hired in May 2018 as the head coach of the Laval Rocket, the American Hockey League (AHL) affiliate of the Montreal Canadiens. In 2021, he left the Rocket at the end of his contract, posting a 83–67–24 record over three seasons.

On July 9, 2021, the Anaheim Ducks hired Bouchard to coach their AHL affiliate, the San Diego Gulls. After only a single season as head coach of the team, Bouchard was relieved from his duties.

On June 26, 2023, Bouchard was hired as head coach of the Syracuse Crunch, the AHL affiliate of the Tampa Bay Lightning.

== Career statistics ==
=== Regular season and playoffs ===
			Regular season					Playoffs
Season	Team	League	GP	G	A	Pts	PIM	GP	G	A	Pts	PIM
1990–91	Longueuil College-Francais	QMJHL	53	3	19	22	34	8	1	0	1	11
1991–92	Verdun College-Francais	QMJHL	70	9	37	46	55	19	1	7	8	20
1992–93	Verdun College-Francais	QMJHL	60	10	49	59	126	4	0	2	2	4
1993–94	Verdun College-Francais	QMJHL	60	15	55	70	62	4	1	0	1	6
1993–94	Saint John Flames	AHL	1	0	0	0	0	2	0	0	0	0
1994–95	Saint John Flames	AHL	77	6	25	31	63	5	1	0	1	4
1994–95	Calgary Flames	NHL	2	0	0	0	0	—	—	—	—	—
1995–96	Saint John Flames	AHL	74	8	25	33	104	16	1	4	5	10
1995–96	Calgary Flames	NHL	4	0	0	0	4	—	—	—	—	—
1996–97	Calgary Flames	NHL	76	4	5	9	49	—	—	—	—	—
1997–98	Saint John Flames	AHL	3	2	1	3	6	—	—	—	—	—
1997–98	Calgary Flames	NHL	44	5	7	12	57	—	—	—	—	—
1998–99	Nashville Predators	NHL	64	4	11	15	60	—	—	—	—	—
1999–00	Nashville Predators	NHL	52	1	4	5	23	—	—	—	—	—
1999–00	Dallas Stars	NHL	2	0	0	0	2	—	—	—	—	—
2000–01	Grand Rapids Griffins	IHL	19	3	9	12	8	—	—	—	—	—
2000–01	Phoenix Coyotes	NHL	32	1	2	3	22	—	—	—	—	—
2001–02	Albany River Rats	AHL	70	9	22	31	28	—	—	—	—	—
2001–02	New Jersey Devils	NHL	1	0	1	1	0	—	—	—	—	—
2002–03	Hartford Wolf Pack	AHL	22	6	14	20	22	—	—	—	—	—
2002–03	New York Rangers	NHL	27	5	7	12	14	—	—	—	—	—
2002–03	Pittsburgh Penguins	NHL	7	0	1	1	0	—	—	—	—	—
2003–04	New York Rangers	NHL	28	1	7	8	10	—	—	—	—	—
2004–05	Hartford Wolf Pack	AHL	7	1	3	4	6	6	0	2	2	20
2005–06	Bridgeport Sound Tigers	AHL	15	4	9	13	10	—	—	—	—	—
2005–06	New York Islanders	NHL	25	1	8	9	23	—	—	—	—	—
2006–07	Bridgeport Sound Tigers	AHL	4	0	3	3	0	—	—	—	—	—
2007–08	Hamilton Bulldogs	AHL	20	1	6	7	18	—	—	—	—	—
NHL totals			364	22	53	75	264	—	—	—	—	—

Medal record

Ice hockey

Representing Canada

World Championships
Gold medal – first place	1997 Helsinki	

World Junior Championships
Gold medal – first place	1993 Gävle	
Gold medal – first place	1994 Ostrava	

=== International ===
Year	Team	Event	Result	GP	G	A	Pts	PIM
1993	Canada	WJC	1st place, gold medalist(s)	7	0	0	0	0
1994	Canada	WJC	1st place, gold medalist(s)	7	0	1	1	10
1997	Canada	WC	1st place, gold medalist(s)	11	0	1	1	2
Junior totals				14	0	1	1	10
Senior totals				11	0	1	1	2

== Coaching record ==
=== QMJHL ===
Team	Year	Regular Season						Post Season
Team	Year	G	W	L	OTL	Pts	Finish	Result
BLB	2014–15	68	41	18	9	91	1st in West	Lost in first round (2–4 vs. GAT)
BLB	2015–16	68	26	32	10	62	4th in West	Won in first round (4–2 vs. VDR); Lost in quarter-finals (1–4 vs. ROU)
BLB	2016–17	68	43	19	6	92	2nd in West	Won in first round (4–0 vs. DRU); Won in quarter-finals (4–3 vs. BAT); Won in semi-finals (4–1 vs. CHA); Lost in President's Cup final (0–4 vs. SJ)
BLB	2017–18	68	50	11	7	107	1st in West	Won in first round (4–0 vs. VDR); Won in quarter-finals (4–1 vs. MON); Won in semi-finals (4–3 vs. CHA); Lost in President's Cup final (2–4 vs. BAT)
QMJHL totals	2014–18	272	160	80	32	352	2 division titles	33–26 (0.559)

=== AHL ===
Team	Year	Regular Season						Post Season
Team	Year	G	W	L	OTL	Pts	Finish	Result
LAV	2018–19	76	30	34	12	72	7th in North	Did not qualify
LAV	2019–20	62	30	24	8	68	6th in North	Playoffs cancelled due to COVID-19 pandemic
LAV	2020–21	36	23	9	4	50	1st in Canadian	Playoffs cancelled due to COVID-19 pandemic
LAV totals	2018–21	174	83	67	24	190	1 division title	0–0 (0.000)
SD	2021–22	68	28	33	7	63	7th in Pacific	Lost in first round (0–2 vs. ONT)
SD totals	2021–22	68	28	33	7	63	0 division titles	0–2 (0.000)
SYR	2023–24	72	39	24	9	87	3rd in North	Won division semifinals (3–1 vs. ROC), Lost in division finals (0–3 vs. CLE)
SYR totals	2023–24	72	39	24	9	87	0 division titles	3–4 (0.428)
AHL totals	2018–24	314	150	124	40	340	1 division title	3–6 (0.333)
