= 2004–05 Eredivisie (ice hockey) season =

Dutch ice hockey season

The 2004–05 Eredivisie season was the 45th season of the Eredivisie, the top level of ice hockey in the Netherlands. Six teams participated in the league, and the Amsterdam Bulldogs won the championship.

== Regular season ==
=== Group A ===
	Club	GP	W	OTW	OTL	L	GF	GA	Pts
1.	Amsterdam Bulldogs	4	4	0	0	0	21	9	12
2.	Eaters Geleen	4	1	0	0	3	12	18	3
3.	Heerenveen Flyers	4	1	0	0	3	9	15	3

=== Group B ===
	Club	GP	W	OTW	OTL	L	GF	GA	Pts
4.	Tilburg Trappers	4	2	0	0	2	16	11	6
5.	Nijmegen Emperors	4	2	0	0	2	12	14	6
6.	H.IJ.S Hoky Den Haag	4	2	0	0	2	14	17	6

== Playoffs ==
Semi-finals
Amsterdam Bulldogs	3
Tilburg Trappers	1
Eaters Geleen	1
Heerenveen Flyers	3

Final
Amsterdam Bulldogs	3
Heerenveen Flyers	0
Third place
not played
