= Philippe DeRouville =

Canadian ice hockey player (born 1974)

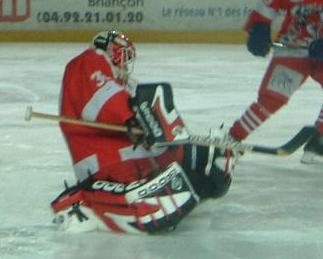
- DeRouville in 2010
- Born: August 7, 1974 (age 50); Victoriaville, Quebec, Canada
- Height: 6 ft 1 in (185 cm)
- Weight: 183 lb (83 kg; 13 st 1 lb)
- Position: Goaltender
- Caught: Left
- Played for: Pittsburgh Penguins; Ayr Scottish Eagles; Timrå IK; Briançon; HC Pustertal; Belfast Giants; Medveščak Zagreb
- NHL draft: 115th overall, 1992; Pittsburgh Penguins
- Playing career: 1994–2008

Philippe DeRouville (born August 7, 1974) is a Canadian former professional ice hockey goaltender. He played 3 games in the National Hockey League with the Pittsburgh Penguins during the 1994–95 and 1996–97 seasons. The rest of his career, which lasted from 1994 to 2008, was spent in the minor leagues and then in Europe.

== Playing career ==
DeRouville was a top prospect in junior hockey but his National Hockey League tenure lasted all of three games in the 1990s. He bounced around the minors for five years before playing in various European leagues.

Born in Victoriaville, Quebec, DeRouville played in the QAAA with Magog before joining Longueuil Collège Français of the QMJHL. He was chosen 115th overall by the Pittsburgh Penguins in 1992 then returned to junior for two more years. DeRouville represented Canada at the 1993 World Junior Ice Hockey Championships. The gifted youngster was named to the league's second all-star team in 1993 and 1994. In 1993–94 his 3.06 goals against average was the best in the QMJHL.

DeRouville played most of his first two pro seasons with the IHL's Cleveland Lumberjacks but was recalled to make the odd appearance between the pipes for the Pens. In 1996–97, the emergence of rookie Patrick Lalime kept him from moving up to Pittsburgh. Eventually young goalie Jean-Sébastien Aubin and Peter Skudra supplanted DeRouville on the club's depth chart. Over his last two years he played in the ECHL, IHL, AHL and CHL before moving to Europe. He played in Britain for the Ayr Scottish Eagles, Sweden for Timrå IK, France for Briançon and Italy for Brunico SG . He signed for the British Elite Ice Hockey League side Belfast Giants towards the end of the 2006–07 season replace injured goalie Mike Minard. He re-signed for the Giants for the 2007–08 season but after the signing of Stevie Lyle from the Basingstoke Bison, it was announced on October 17, 2007, that DeRouville was released by the Giants.

DeRouville has received offers from 2 different teams on October 18, 2007, and signed on October 23, 2007, with the Croatian team KHL Medveščak from Zagreb, that plays in the Croatian and in the Slovenian league.

== Career statistics ==
=== Regular season and playoffs ===
			Regular season										Playoffs
Season	Team	League	GP	W	L	T	OTL	MIN	GA	SO	GAA	SV%	GP	W	L	MIN	GA	SO	GAA	SV%
1989–90	Magog Cantonniers	QAAA	21	15	6	0	—	1213	90	0	4.45	—	11	7	4	708	54	0	4.58	—
1990–91	Longueuil Collège Français	QMJHL	20	13	6	0	—	1030	50	0	2.91	.888	1	0	0	11	2	0	10.53	.800
1991–92	Verdun Collège Français	QMJHL	34	20	6	3	—	1854	99	2	3.20	.891	11	7	3	593	28	1	2.83	.899
1992–93	Verdun Collège Français	QMJHL	61	30	27	2	—	3491	210	1	3.61	.891	4	0	4	256	18	0	3.61	.891
1993–94	Verdun Collège Français	QMJHL	51	28	22	0	—	2845	145	1	3.06	.904	4	0	4	210	14	0	4.00	.890
1994–95	Pittsburgh Penguins	NHL	1	1	0	0	—	60	3	0	3.00	.889	—	—	—	—	—	—	—	—
1994–95	Cleveland Lumberjacks	IHL	41	24	10	5	—	2369	131	1	3.32	—	4	1	3	263	18	0	4.09	.893
1995–96	Cleveland Lumberjacks	IHL	38	19	11	3	—	2008	129	1	3.86	.894	—	—	—	—	—	—	—	—
1996–97	Pittsburgh Penguins	NHL	2	0	2	0	—	112	6	0	3.24	.909	—	—	—	—	—	—	—	—
1996–97	Kansas City Blades	IHL	26	11	11	4	—	1470	69	2	2.82	.911	2	0	1	32	4	0	7.35	.692
1997–98	Louisville RiverFrogs	ECHL	8	5	2	1	—	480	27	0	3.38	.915	—	—	—	—	—	—	—	—
1997–98	Hartford Wolf Pack	AHL	3	0	2	1	—	184	10	0	3.26	.888	—	—	—	—	—	—	—	—
1997–98	Utah Grizzlies	IHL	30	18	9	1	—	1524	65	3	2.56	.916	2	1	1	129	7	0	3.25	.922
1998–99	Utah Grizzlies	IHL	5	0	2	0	—	142	12	0	5.07	.826	—	—	—	—	—	—	—	—
1998–99	San Antonio Iguanas	CHL	5	3	2	0	—	181	13	0	4.31	.877	—	—	—	—	—	—	—	—
1998–99	Fredericton Canadiens	AHL	19	6	6	2	—	921	46	0	3.00	.904	—	—	—	—	—	—	—	—
1999–00	ERC Ingolstadt	GER-2	45	—	—	—	—	2515	111	2	2.65	—	—	—	—	—	—	—	—	—
2000–01	Ayr Scottish Eagles	BISL	8	4	3	1	—	480	23	0	2.99	.908	6	—	—	—	—	—	3.29	.899
2001–02	Timrå IK	SWE	18	—	—	—	—	920	50	1	3.26	.879	—	—	—	—	—	—	—	—
2001–02	Thetford-Mines Prolab	QSPHL	9	4	4	1	—	546	30	0	3.29	.875	19	11	6	1066	46	4	2.59	—
2003–04	Briançon	FRA	—	—	—	—	—	—	—	—	—	—	4	—	—	—	—	—	—	—
2004–05	HC Pustertal	ITA	19	—	—	—	—	1107	53	3	2.87	.901	4	—	—	—	—	—	5.05	.844
2005–06	HC Pustertal	ITA	22	—	—	—	—	1297	79	0	3.65	.892	—	—	—	—	—	—	—	—
2006–07	Egna HC	ITA-2	30	—	—	—	—	—	—	—	3.37	—	—	—	—	—	—	—	—	—
2006–07	Belfast Giants	EIHL	9	—	—	—	—	—	—	—	1.73	.924	3	—	—	—	—	—	1.62	.935
2007–08	Belfast Giants	EIHL	11	—	—	—	—	—	—	—	3.00	.897	—	—	—	—	—	—	—	—
2007–08	KHL Medveščak Zagreb	SLO	5	—	—	—	—	—	—	—	3.60	—	—	—	—	—	—	—	—	—
2007–08	Mission de Sorel-Tracy	LNAH	12	—	—	—	—	—	—	—	5.29	.852	—	—	—	—	—	—	—	—
NHL totals			3	1	2	0	—	172	9	0	3.16	.903	—	—	—	—	—	—	—	—

=== International ===
Year	Team	Event	GP	W	L	T	MIN	GA	SO	GAA	SV%
1993	Canada	WJC	1	0	1	0	60	7	0	7.00	.875
Junior totals			1	0	1	0	60	7	0	7.00	.875

== Awards ==
- QMJHL Defensive Rookie of the Year (1992)
- QMJHL Second All-Star Team (1993, 1994)
