= Colisée Jean Béliveau =

Arena in Longueuil, Quebec, Canada

Colisée Jean-Béliveau
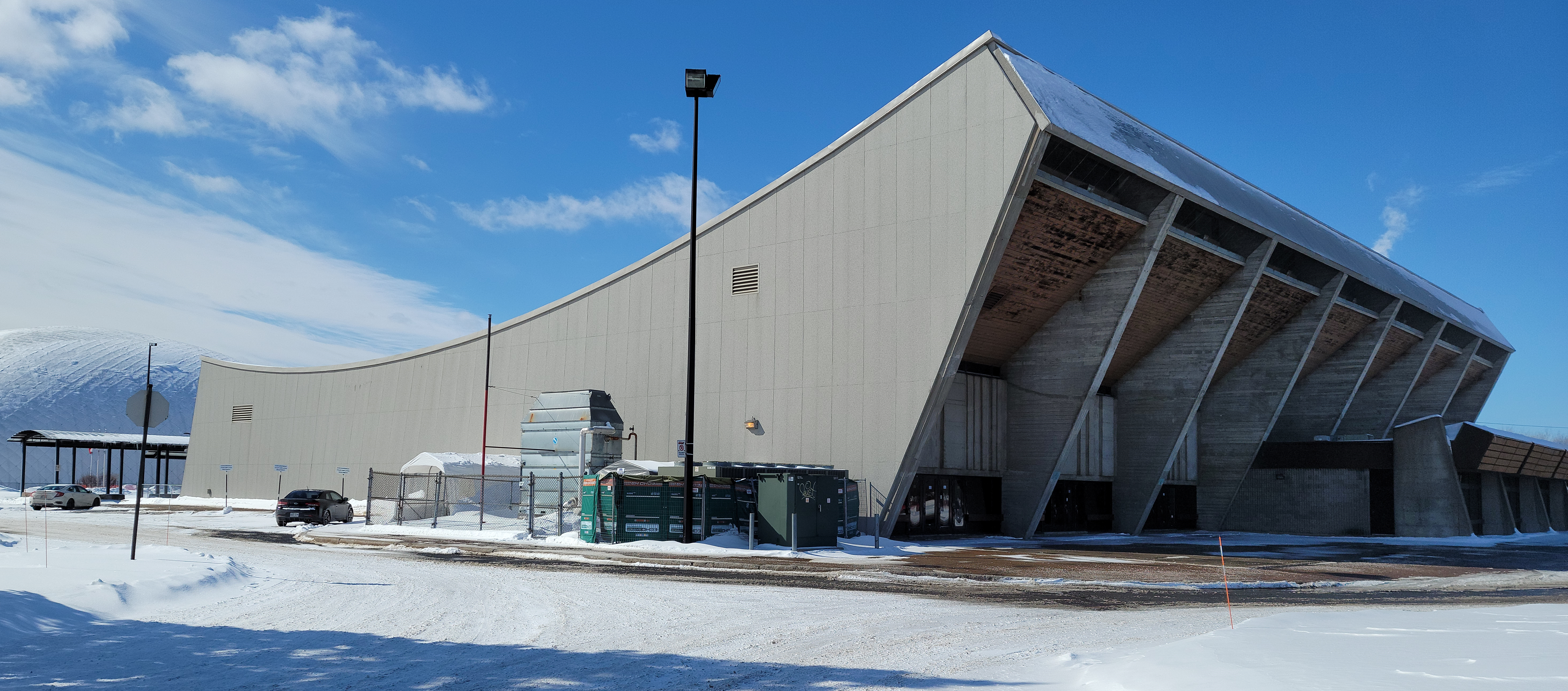
- Interactive map of Colisée Jean-Béliveau
- Former names: Aréna Jacques-Cartier
- Location: 1755 Boulevard Jacques-Cartier Est, Longueuil, Quebec, Canada
- Coordinates: 45°32′39″N 73°27′26″W
- Capacity: 2,400 seated, 2,600 (including standing room)

Construction
- Cost: CAD $924,000
- Architects: Major and Gagnon

The Colisée Jean-Béliveau (originally known as Aréna Jacques-Cartier) is a multi-purpose arena built in 1966 in Longueuil, Quebec, and home to the ice hockey team of Le Collège Français de Longueuil, that play in the Quebec Junior AAA Hockey League. The arena was originally named Aréna Jacques-Cartier, but renamed in 1971 in honour of former hockey great, Jean Béliveau to mark his 500th career goal.

It has 2,400 seats, and a total capacity of 2,600 with standing room. It previously hosted two ice hockey teams in the Quebec Major Junior Hockey League, the Longueuil Chevaliers (1982–87) and the Longueuil Collège Français (1988–91).

The original plans were conceived by the architects Major and Gagnon, then completed by consulting engineers Lalonde, Girouard & Letendre, and was built by the firm Désourdy (now named Construction DJL inc.). It was built at a cost of $924,000.
