= Chris Nilan =

American ice hockey player

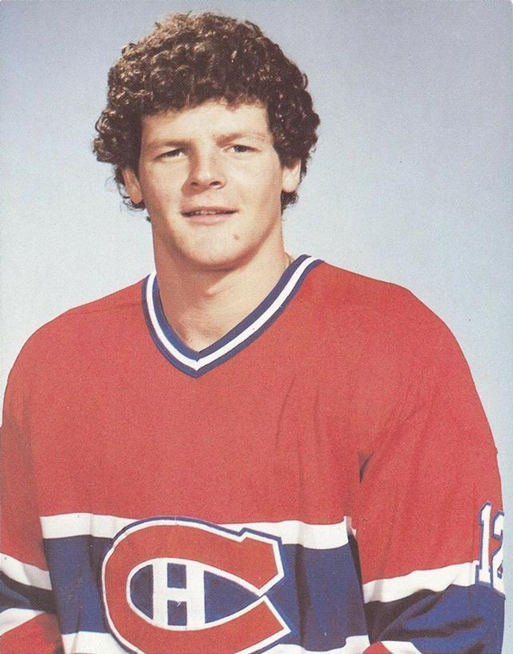
- Born: February 9, 1958 (age 68) Boston, Massachusetts, U.S.
- Height: 6 ft 0 in (183 cm)
- Weight: 205 lb (93 kg; 14 st 9 lb)
- Position: Right wing
- Shot: Right
- Played for: Montreal Canadiens; New York Rangers; Boston Bruins
- National team: United States
- NHL draft: 231st overall, 1978; Montreal Canadiens
- Playing career: 1979–1992
- Website: Official website

Christopher John Nilan (born February 9, 1958) is an American former professional ice hockey player and former radio host. Nilan played 688 National Hockey League (NHL) regular season games as a right-wing for the Montreal Canadiens, New York Rangers, and Boston Bruins between 1980 and 1992. He won the Stanley Cup in 1986 with Montreal.

Known as "Knuckles" or "Knux", he was famous for his propensity to fight. He holds a record for most penalty minutes by an American-born player. Nilan's life and career are prominently featured in Alex Gibney's 2011 documentary film The Last Gladiators.

== Playing career ==
Nilan grew up in Massachusetts where he idolized Bobby Orr and dreamed of playing for the Boston Bruins. He played his youth hockey with the Parkway (West Roxbury, Massachusetts) team of the Greater Boston Youth Hockey League (GBYHL), sponsored by the Metropolitan District Commission (MDC). He later played college hockey for the Northeastern University Huskies, from 1976 to 1979, averaging 3.5 penalty minutes per game in his final collegiate season.

Nilan was selected 231st overall in the 1978 NHL entry draft, and was best known as a tough-guy for the Montreal Canadiens in the mid 1980s. One of only nine players in National Hockey League (NHL) history to have recorded more than 3,000 career penalty minutes, he holds the records of highest penalty minute average per game at 4.42 minutes per game, the most penalty minutes in a single playoff season at 141, as well as the record for most penalties in a single game— March 31, 1991, when the Hartford Whalers visited Nilan's Bruins, Nilan was assessed a record ten penalties: six minors, two majors, one misconduct and one game misconduct, for a total of 42 penalty minutes.

Seriously hobbled by repeated injuries, Nilan missed over two hundred games in his final five seasons, and would only play as many as 50 games twice in his final four seasons. He retired after the 1991–92 season. Highlights of his career include winning the Stanley Cup in 1986 with the Canadiens, being named to Team USA for the 1987 Canada Cup, and his controversial selection to the 1991 NHL All-Star Game by his then-coach Mike Milbury (Nilan missed the game with a broken left ankle), which led to changes in how players are selected for all-star games.

== Post career ==
Nilan returned to the Boston area and went into the insurance business after retirement. He spent three years as community relations consultant for John Hancock Insurance before returning to hockey as a coach. He was initially hired as an assistant coach of the New Jersey Devils on August 3, 1995, and remained in that position until May 1996, before becoming a head coach for the Chesapeake Icebreakers of the ECHL.

Nilan was married to Karen Stanley in 1981. They were divorced in 2006. They have two daughters, Colleen and Tara, and one son, Christopher. Karen was a daughter of Theresa Stanley, who was one of notorious crime boss Whitey Bulger's girlfriends.

Today Nilan talks openly about his past problems with alcohol and prescription drugs, as well as battling a heroin addiction. He is involved in numerous social and charitable causes. Nilan also speaks to local students in Montreal about learning from his life experiences and mistakes.

Nilan lived in Oregon for two years, where he met his current girlfriend, Jaime Holtz (who is originally from Kailua-Kona, Hawaii). Chris moved back to Montreal with Jaime in 2011, and they currently reside in Montreal.

He began hosting his own program, Off the Cuff on TSN Radio 690 Montreal, on March 18, 2013, after being a daily phone-in guest on Melnick in the Afternoon for a number of months. The show aired from noon to 3:00 p.m. weekdays local time, also streamed live online. In 2022, he was fired from his Off the Cuff hosting position by Bell Media after he refused to get vaccinated against COVID-19.

Nilan Currently hosts his own Podcast "The Raw Knuckles Podcast"

== Awards ==
- Won the Stanley Cup in 1986 with the Montreal Canadiens
- Selected to one NHL All-Star Game: 1991

== Career statistics ==
=== Regular season and playoffs ===
Bold indicates led league

			Regular season					Playoffs
Season	Team	League	GP	G	A	Pts	PIM	GP	G	A	Pts	PIM
1975–76	Northwood School	Prep	—	—	—	—	—	—	—	—	—	—
1976–77	Northeastern University	ECAC	20	3	2	5	—	—	—	—	—	—
1977–78	Northeastern University	ECAC	20	8	9	17	—	—	—	—	—	—
1977–78	Tri-Valley Squares	NEJHL	—	—	—	—	—	—	—	—	—	—
1978–79	Northeastern University	ECAC	32	9	17	26	—	—	—	—	—	—
1979–80	Nova Scotia Voyageurs	AHL	49	15	10	25	304	—	—	—	—	—
1979–80	Montreal Canadiens	NHL	15	0	2	2	50	5	0	0	0	2
1980–81	Montreal Canadiens	NHL	57	7	8	15	262	2	0	0	0	0
1981–82	Montreal Canadiens	NHL	49	7	4	11	204	5	1	1	2	22
1982–83	Montreal Canadiens	NHL	66	6	8	14	213	3	0	0	0	5
1983–84	Montreal Canadiens	NHL	76	16	10	26	**338**	15	1	0	1	81
1984–85	Montreal Canadiens	NHL	77	21	16	37	**358**	12	2	1	3	81
1985–86	Montreal Canadiens	NHL	72	19	15	34	274	18	1	2	3	**141**
1986–87	Montreal Canadiens	NHL	44	4	16	20	266	17	3	0	3	75
1987–88	Montreal Canadiens	NHL	50	7	5	12	209	—	—	—	—	—
1987–88	New York Rangers	NHL	22	3	5	8	96	—	—	—	—	—
1988–89	New York Rangers	NHL	38	7	7	14	177	4	0	1	1	38
1989–90	New York Rangers	NHL	25	1	2	3	59	4	0	1	1	19
1990–91	Boston Bruins	NHL	41	6	9	15	277	19	0	2	2	62
1991–92	Boston Bruins	NHL	39	5	5	10	186	—	—	—	—	—
1991–92	Montreal Canadiens	NHL	17	1	3	4	74	7	0	1	1	15
NHL totals			688	110	115	225	3,043	111	8	9	17	541

=== International ===
Year	Team	Event	GP	G	A	Pts	PIM
1987	United States	CC	5	2	0	2	14

== See also ==
- List of NHL players with 2000 career penalty minutes
