= Verdun Collège Français =

- City: Verdun, Quebec
- League: QMJHL
- Operated: 1991 to 1994
- Home arena: Verdun Auditorium
- Colours: Blue, red, and white

Franchise history
- 1969 to 1985: Quebec Remparts
- 1988 to 1991: Longueuil Collège Français
- 1991 to 1994: Verdun Collège Français

Verdun Collège Français were a junior ice hockey team from Verdun, Quebec, Canada. They were members of the Quebec Major Junior Hockey League from 1991 to 1994. Collège Français resurrected the dormant Quebec Remparts franchise in 1985 after a three-year hiatus, as Longueuil Collège Français. The team played in Longueuil, Quebec at Colisée Jean Béliveau for three seasons before moving to the Verdun Auditorium.

Led by coach Gerard Gagnon, Verdun finished the 1991–92 regular season first overall winning the Jean Rougeau Trophy with 101 points. Collège Français won all three playoff rounds en route to capturing the President's Cup as league playoff champions. Verdun represented the QMJHL at the 1992 Memorial Cup, finishing fourth place.

The franchise ceased operations after the 1993–94 QMJHL season, and the Collège Français transferred its sponsorship and some management to the Laval Titan. The team's players were assigned to other QMJHL clubs by a dispersal draft. The expansion Halifax Mooseheads claimed top prospect Jean-Sébastien Giguère from the defunct Verdun team.

== NHL alumni ==
Longueuil (1988–1991)

- Joel Bouchard, Donald Brashear, Philippe DeRouville, Karl Dykhuis

Verdun (1991–1994)

- Matthew Barnaby, Joel Bouchard, Donald Brashear, Jonathan Delisle, Philippe DeRouville, Yanick Dupre, Karl Dykhuis, Jean-Sébastien Giguère, Daniel Guérard, Christian Laflamme, Marc Rodgers, Jean-Guy Trudel
