= Grinder (ice hockey) =

Ice hockey player known for their checking and work ethic

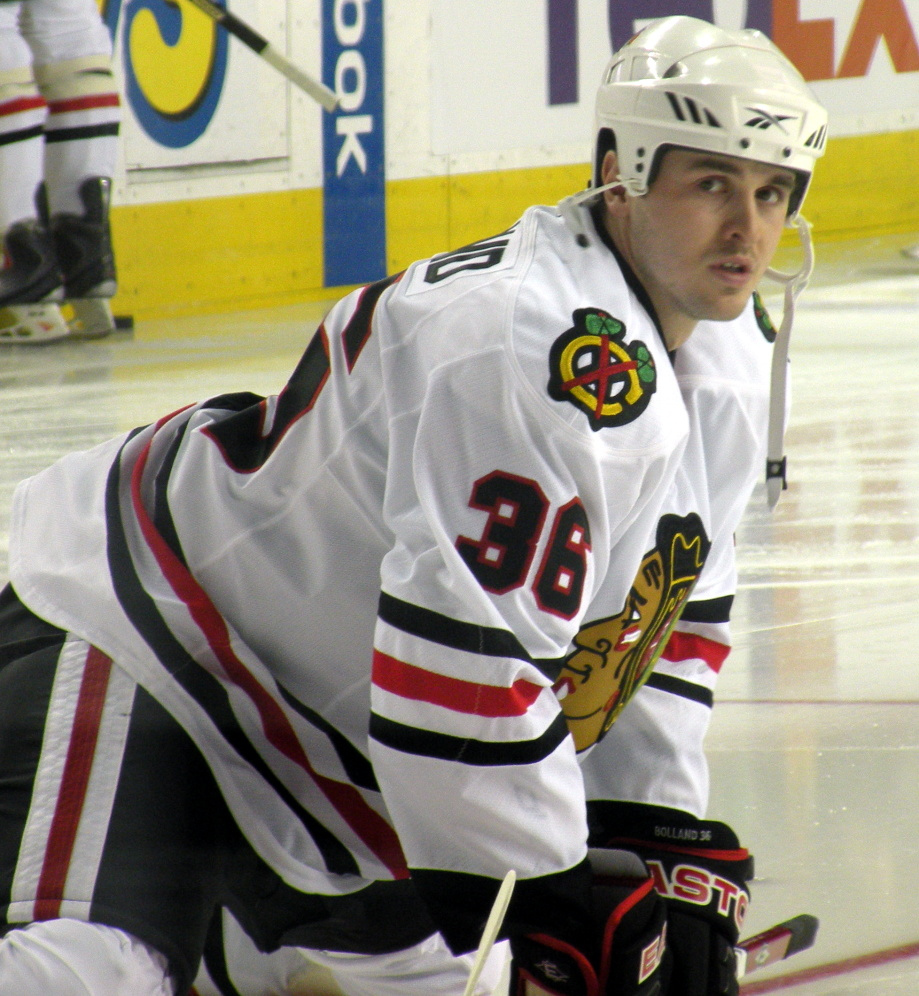
Dave Bolland, at the time playing for the Chicago Blackhawks, was named "Best Grinder" by The Hockey News in 2012.

In ice hockey, a grinder is a player better known for his hard work and checking than his scoring. A grinder is often a player who has limited offensive skills, but is valuable to a hockey team due to physical forechecking skills especially along the boards; for "grinding along the boards". The grinder is not in the spotlight as would be the offensively skilled scoring stars, but they are often fan favorites due to their work effort in games. A grinder is often the player who, by their willingness to endure the physical abuse of going into the corners to dig out the puck, often sets up the goals by getting the puck to the team's offensive stars. It is common belief in hockey that a good team needs a balance of scoring stars and grinders.

While grinder often refers to a player of lesser offensive skills, this is not always the case. NHL Hall of Fame inductee Bobby Clarke of the 1970s and 80s Philadelphia Flyers was considered a grinder, but was also a highly productive offensive player. While a "grinder" plays a physical style of hockey they are distinguished from an "enforcer". While most "grinders" will fight, some do not; "grinder" refers specifically to a style of defensive hockey which is within the rules of the game. Sometimes grinder is used in combination with "mucker" to describe a player as a "mucker and a grinder", although it is used as emphasis. In this context, mucker is largely synonymous with grinder.

Indicative of the importance of the grinder is that Bobby Clarke and Mike Eruzione, both grinder-style players, played major roles in their respective countries' victories over the offensively-skilled Soviet Union national team. Clarke was a significant factor in Team Canada's victory in the 1972 Super Series, as was Eruzione as captain for the United States' Olympic team in the 1980 Miracle on Ice victory. Clarke received the Selke Trophy as best defensive forward late in his playing career.

In 2012, The Hockey News named Dave Bolland of the NHL Chicago Blackhawks as "Best Grinder".

== See also ==
- Pest (ice hockey)
