= Pest (ice hockey) =

Ice hockey player known for their abrasiveness

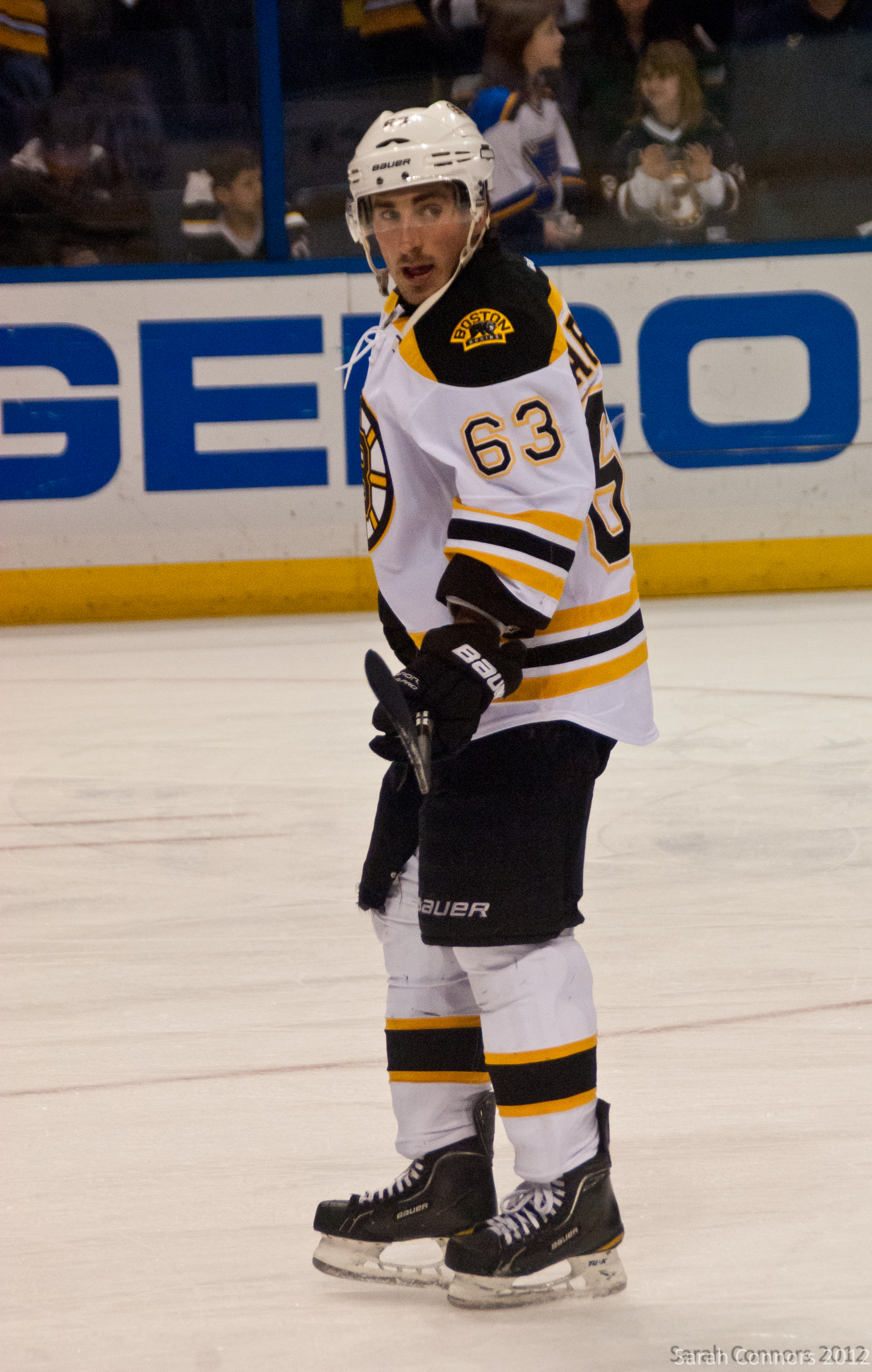
Brad Marchand is a notable pest in the current NHL; he is often referred to as "The Rat".

In ice hockey, a pest is a player who attempts to antagonize opponents either by physical play or verbal incitement. Pests employ tactics that are legal, borderline, or illegal to accomplish their goals. Some common tactics include chirping or slashing and hooking while referees are not looking. They may employ the tactic of goading opponents into a fight but then backing off in order to draw a penalty against them. Some pests may not only use these tactics against opposing skaters, but opposing goaltenders as well. Pest and agitator are sometimes used synonymously, as both are usually characterized by short bursts of intensity and speed with the intention of creating havoc.

The term has been used derogatorily to refer to a player who incites anger in the opposition but is unwilling to directly suffer the consequences of their actions by engaging in fighting, as would an enforcer. George McPhee, former general manager of the Washington Capitals and president of the Vegas Golden Knights, said, "Pests are really the guys who have no courage. They start stuff and don't back it up."

== Examples of pests in NHL ==
In February 2001, Hockey Digest published a list of the NHL's best pests. They were: Bob Kelly, Matt Cooke, Esa Tikkanen, Tomas Holmstrom, Darius Kasparaitis, Ian Laperriere, Tyson Nash, Todd Harvey, Matthew Barnaby, Kris Draper, Bill Lindsay, Jamal Mayers and Steve Staios.

In 2009, Sports Illustrated also compiled their own list of "Notable Pests of the NHL". Their list included: Claude Lemieux, Steve Ott, Jordin Tootoo, Jarkko Ruutu, Matt Cooke, Alexandre Burrows, Chris Neil, Ian Laperriere, Darcy Tucker, Chris Simon, Matthew Barnaby, Theo Fleury, Pat Verbeek, Esa Tikkanen, Ken Linseman and Tiger Williams.

== See also ==
- Grinder (ice hockey)
