= Kip Noble =

Canadian ice hockey player

- Born: January 18, 1968 (age 58) Dawson Creek, British Columbia, Canada
- Height: 5 ft 9 in (175 cm)
- Weight: 190 lb (86 kg; 13 st 8 lb)
- Position: Defenseman
- Shot: Left
- Played for: Michigan Tech; Peter Langhout Utrecht; Detroit Falcons; Nijmegen Tigers; Tilburg Trappers; Durham Wasps; Cardiff Devils; Sheffield Steelers; Dawson Creek Canucks; Horse Lake Thunder; Fort St. John Flyers; Horse Lake Chiefs
- National team: Canada
- Playing career: 1986–2012

Kip Noble (January 18, 1968) is a Canadian ice hockey coach and former defenseman who was an All-American for Michigan Tech.

== Career ==
Noble came to Michigan Tech in 1986 after wrapping up two high-scoring years of junior hockey. It took him a year of collegiate hockey before he caught up to speed but, in his sophomore season, Noble became the leading scorer from the blueline for the Huskies and remained the team's leading light for three years. Unfortunately for Noble, his time coincided with Michigan Tech being on the decline and the team never produced a winning season with him on the team. Noble's best year came as a senior when he set numerous program records, including most goals and points by a defenseman in a season and became the Huskies' all-time leading defensive scorer.

After graduating, Noble travelled to Europe to begin his professional career, spending ten of the next eleven years in the Netherlands or the United Kingdom. He was one of the leading scorers on three Eredivisie Championship teams (1991, 1993 and 1995), leading Flame Guard Nijmegen in postseason scoring for his second title. After a successful run in the low countries, he won a third league championship with the Cardiff Devils in 1997 and then helped get the Devils and the Sheffield Steelers to three consecutive BISL finals.

Noble returned to British Columbia after the 2001 season and played senior hockey for most of the next twelve years. He played on a Horse Lake Thunder team in 2005 that included former NHL standouts like Theoren Fleury, Gino Odjick and Sasha Lakovic. He won two Allan Cups, during this time along with several league championships. After finishing his playing career in 2012 he became a junior hockey coach in the Penticton area.

Noble was inducted into the Michigan Tech Athletic Hall of Fame in 2018.

== Statistics ==
=== Regular season and playoffs ===
			Regular Season					Playoffs
Season	Team	League	GP	G	A	Pts	PIM	GP	G	A	Pts	PIM
1984–85	Dawson Creek Kodiaks	PCJHL	44	24	48	72	47	—	—	—	—	—
1985–86	Kelowna Packers	BCJHL	50	14	45	59	32	—	—	—	—	—
1986–87	Michigan Tech	WCHA	33	2	6	8	33	—	—	—	—	—
1987–88	Michigan Tech	WCHA	41	9	26	35	48	—	—	—	—	—
1988–89	Michigan Tech	WCHA	42	8	22	30	38	—	—	—	—	—
1989–90	Michigan Tech	WCHA	40	17	33	50	46	—	—	—	—	—
1989–90	Team Canada	International	2	0	0	0	0	—	—	—	—	—
1990–91	Peter Langhout Utrecht	Eredivisie	24	15	23	38	16	10	7	14	21	0
1991–92	Michigan Falcons	CoHL	59	15	32	47	22	5	0	5	5	0
1992–93	Flame Guard Nijmegen	Eredivisie	24	15	28	43	20	17	7	25	32	4
1993–94	Flame Guard Nijmegen	Eredivisie	16	13	24	37	6	14	12	13	25	4
1994–95	Couwenberg Trappers Tilburg	Eredivisie	24	20	33	53	30	6	5	8	13	4
1995–96	Durham Wasps	BHL	36	28	33	61	12	7	6	2	8	0
1996–97	Cardiff Devils	BISL	42	15	24	39	16	7	3	2	5	6
1997–98	Cardiff Devils	BISL	38	8	21	29	14	9	5	7	12	4
1998–99	Cardiff Devils	BISL	42	11	22	33	8	8	1	1	2	2
1999–00	Sheffield Steelers	BISL	42	7	29	36	12	7	2	3	5	4
2000–01	Cardiff Devils	BISL	47	8	22	31	10	6	0	1	1	0
2001–02	Dawson Creek Canucks	NorthPHL	—	—	—	—	—	—	—	—	—	—
2002–03	Dawson Creek Canucks	NorthPHL	—	—	—	—	—	—	—	—	—	—
2003–04	Dawson Creek Canucks	NorthPHL	—	—	—	—	—	—	—	—	—	—
2004–05	Horse Lake Thunder	NorthPHL	25	23	47	70	2	7	6	9	15	0
2006–07	Horse Lake Thunder	NorthPHL	23	15	64	79	18	11	4	16	20	18
2008–09	Fort St. John Flyers	NorthPHL	26	22	49	71	4	7	6	7	13	8
2009–10	Fort St. John Flyers	NorthPHL	—	—	—	—	—	—	—	—	—	—
2009–10	Dawson Creek Canucks	NorthPHL	—	—	—	—	—	10	6	10	16	2
2010–11	Dawson Creek Canucks	NorthPHL	7	1	11	12	15	—	—	—	—	—
2011–12	Horse Lake Chiefs	NorthPHL	6	6	4	10	2	—	—	—	—	—
NCAA totals			156	36	87	123	165	—	—	—	—	—
Eredivisie totals			88	63	108	171	72	47	31	60	91	12
BISL totals			211	49	118	167	60	37	11	14	25	16

=== Allan Cup ===
Year	Team	Event	Result	GP	G	A	Pts	PIM
2006	Powell River Regals	Allan Cup	1st	4	3	4	7	2
2010	Fort St. John Flyers	Allan Cup	1st	4	1	4	5	12

== Awards and honors ==
Award	Year
All-WCHA First Team	1989–90
AHCA West Second-Team All-American	1989–90
