= North Peace Hockey League =

Canadian men's Senior ice hockey league

- Sport: Ice hockey
- First season: 1953–54
- President: Michael Mercredi
- No. of teams: 9
- Country: Canada
- Most recent champion: Manning Comets (2025-26)
- Related competitions: Campbell Cup; Coy Cup; Allan Cup
- Website: northpeacehockeyleague.com

The North Peace Hockey League (NPHL) is a Canadian men's Senior ice hockey league in Peace River Country in Northern Alberta and British Columbia.

== History ==
The league formed in 1954 and is the longest running senior ice hockey league in Canada. The league was down to two teams (Peace River Stampeders and High Prairie Regals) in the early 1970s, when it played an interlocking schedule with the South Peace Hockey League.

Prior to the start of the 2009–10 season, the league voted to disallow any team playing AAA hockey from competing in the NPHL playoffs. This change affects teams competing for the Allan Cup. That same year, the Fort St. John Flyers hosted and won the 2010 Allan Cup national championship. The 2010 Fort St. John Flyers were inducted into the BC Hockey Hall of Fame in 2024.

The 2013–14 season saw the league lose two teams when the Hythe Mustangs folded near the end of the season and the Lakeland Eagles were expelled for repeatedly failing to fulfill league commitments. The 2014–15 season saw the league reduced to six teams with the loss of the Dawson Creek Sr. Canucks and High Prairie Regals. The Grande Prairie Athletics announced it was taking a leave of absence in the 2015–16 season due to a lack of players.

The 2020–21 and 2021–22 seasons were cancelled due to the COVID-19 pandemic. The league returned with 8 teams for the 2022–23 season.

The Grimshaw Huskies announced a leave of absence for the 2023–24 season citing a lack of players. The league rejected a re-entry bid from the High Prairie Regals.

In the 2024–25 season, the High Prairie Regals returned from a five-year hiatus, and the Fox Creek Knights joined as an expansion team.

== Teams ==
East division
Team	Home	Arena
Grimshaw Huskies	Grimshaw,AB	Mile Zero Multiplex
Falher Pirates	Falher, AB	Falher Regional Recreation Complex
Fox Creek Knights	Fox Creek, AB	Greenview Multiplex
High Prairie Regals	High Prairie, AB	High Prairie Sports Palace
Manning Comets	Manning, AB	Jack McAvoy Arena
Valleyview Jets	Valleyview, AB	Polar Palace

West division
Team	Home	Arena
Dawson Creek Canucks	Dawson Creek, BC	Dawson Creek & District Memorial Arena
Grande Prairie Athletics	Grande Prairie, AB	Design Works Centre
Spirit River Rangers	Spirit River, AB	Maclean Rec Centre
Fort St. John Flyers	Fort St. John, BC	North Peace Arena

=== Defunct teams ===
- Beaverlodge 77s
- Fairview Elks
- Fairview Monarchs
- Fairview Kings
- Fort Nelson Fury
- High Prairie Regals
- Horse Lake Thunder
- Horse Lake Chiefs
- Hythe Mustangs
- Lakeland Eagles
- McLennan Red Wings
- Rycroft Flames
- Peace River Stampeders
- Tumbler Ridge Panthers
- Tumbler Ridge Coal Kings

== Championships ==
The Spirit River Rangers won the 2023–24 league championship Campbell Cup after defeating the Falher Pirates in game 7 of the finals. In 2023, the Dawson Creek Canucks defeated the Falher Pirates in overtime of game 7 of the finals.

- 1986–87 Manning Comets
- 1987–88 Grimshaw Huskies
- 1988–89 High Prairie Regals
- 1989–90 Grimshaw Huskies
- 1990–91 Fairview Kings
- 1991–92 Grimshaw Huskies
- 1992–93 Peace River Stampeders
- 1993–94 Peace River Stampeders
- 1994–95 Grimshaw Huskies
- 1995–96 Grimshaw Huskies
- 1996–97 Grimshaw Huskies
- 1997–98 Spirit River Rangers
- 1998–99 Grimshaw Huskies
- 1999–00 Spirit River Rangers
- 2000–01 Spirit River Rangers
- 2001–02 Dawson Creek Canucks
- 2002–03 Dawson Creek Canucks
- 2003–04 Horse Lake Thunder
- 2004–05 Horse Lake Thunder
- 2005–06 Spirit River Rangers
- 2006–07 Peace River Stampeders
- 2007–08 Spirit River Rangers
- 2008–09 Fort St. John Flyers
- 2009–10 Grande Prairie Athletics
- 2010–11 Spirit River Rangers
- 2011–12 Falher Pirates
- 2012–13 Spirit River Rangers
- 2013–14 Spirit River Rangers
- 2014–15 Spirit River Rangers
- 2015–16 Spirit River Rangers
- 2016–17 Spirit River Rangers
- 2017–18 Fort St. John Flyers
- 2018–19 Grande Prairie Athletics
- 2022–23 Dawson Creek Canucks
- 2023–24 Spirit River Rangers
- 2024-25 Manning Comets

== Notable players ==
Gino Odjick played 25 games with the Horse Lake Thunder in the 2004–05 season, averaging 2.6 points and more than 5 penalty minutes per game. Theoren Fleury, Todd Holt, Sasha Lakovic and Dody Wood also played for the Horse Lake Thunder. Columbus Blue Jackets president and former New York Rangers goalie John Davidson played one season with the High Prairie Regals in the early 1970s. Reg Bentley was a player-coach for the High Prairie Regals for a couple years in the early 1960s. AHL and KHL alumnus Jon Mirasty played for the Grande Prairie Athletics during their 2018–19 championship season. Former NHL and AHL player Wade Campbell played for the Grimshaw Huskies both before and after his professional career. Other NHL alumni include Ed Beers and Howard Walker.

== Sources ==
- Barker, Thom (4 October 2024). "Prince Rupert selected to host 2025 Coy Cup". Coast Mountain News. Black Press Media.
- Hitchins, Ed (28 October 2024). "Flyers' rough start: 79 shots against, 10-1 defeat". Energeticcity.ca.
- "NPHL 2024-25 Regular Season Schedule". River Country. 19 September 2024.
- Hitchins, Ed (15 November 2024). "Athletics Crush Flyers 9-1 in NPHL Showdown". The Hamilton Spectator. Metroland Media Group.
- Hitchins, Ed (18 November 2024). "Fahler Pirates sink Flyers, extends winless streak". Energeticcity.ca.
