= Bob Probert =

Canadian ice hockey player (1965–2010)

- Probert (left) in a fight with Darren Langdon, 1997.
- Born: June 5, 1965 Windsor, Ontario, Canada
- Died: July 5, 2010 (aged 45) Windsor, Ontario, Canada
- Height: 6 ft 3 in (191 cm)
- Weight: 230 lb (104 kg; 16 st 6 lb)
- Position: Left wing
- Shot: Left
- Played for: Detroit Red Wings; Chicago Blackhawks
- NHL draft: 46th overall, 1983; Detroit Red Wings
- Playing career: 1985–2002

Robert Alan Probert (June 5, 1965 – July 5, 2010) was a Canadian professional ice hockey forward. Probert played for the National Hockey League (NHL)'s Detroit Red Wings and Chicago Blackhawks. While a successful player by some measures, including being voted to the 1987–88 Campbell Conference all-star team, Probert was best known for his activities as a fighter and enforcer, as well as being one half of the "Bruise Brothers" with then-Red Wing teammate Joey Kocur, during the late 1980s and early 1990s. Probert was also known for his off-ice antics and legal problems.

== Playing career ==
Prior to playing with the Detroit Red Wings, Probert was with the Brantford Alexanders of the Ontario Hockey League. After being drafted, he spent one more season with the Alexanders before spending his 1984–85 season with both the Hamilton Steelhawks and the Sault Ste. Marie Greyhounds of the OHL.

=== Detroit Red Wings (1985–1994) ===
Probert was drafted as the fourth pick in the third round (46th overall) in the 1983 NHL entry draft, in which the Red Wings also selected Kocur and Steve Yzerman.

During the 1985–1986 and 1986–1987 seasons, Probert spent the majority of his time with the Red Wings while occasionally playing for their minor league affiliate Adirondack Red Wings of the American Hockey League. In the 1985–1986 season, he finished third on the team in penalty minutes behind Kocur and Randy Ladouceur, both of whom played more regular season games than Probert. In the 1986–1987 season, Probert accumulated only 24 points, but amassed 221 penalty minutes.

The 1987–1988 season was the pinnacle of Probert's career. He cemented his reputation as an enforcer with a league-leading 398 penalty minutes, the sixth-highest single-season total in NHL history. He also tied for third on the team with 62 points, and played in his only NHL All-Star Game. In addition he contributed the most points during the Red Wings' playoff run, in which Yzerman missed all but the final three games with a knee injury.

Probert's career hit a snag in 1989 when he was arrested for cocaine possession while crossing the Detroit–Windsor border. U.S. Customs agents at the Detroit–Windsor Tunnel found 14 grams of cocaine hidden in Probert's underpants. He served three months in a federal prison in Minnesota, three more months in a halfway house, and was indefinitely suspended from the NHL. The NHL lifted the suspension at the conclusion of his prison term. Probert was initially ordered to be deported to Canada following his conviction, but he immediately filed for an appeal. The appeal process allowed him to resume his career with the Red Wings, but barred him from traveling with the team to Canada, as he would not be allowed to return to the United States. The matter was resolved on 7 December 1992, when the Immigration and Naturalization Service granted his appeal, restoring his travel privileges between the United States and Canada.

When Probert returned to the Red Wings, he was temporarily one of the alternate captains of the team along with Gerard Gallant. While his penalty minutes remained high, he also averaged 40 points a season. During his last season with the Red Wings, he accumulated only 17 points for the team.

At this time, Probert once again got into trouble with the law. On 15 July 1994, he had minor injuries when he crashed his motorcycle into a car in West Bloomfield Township, Michigan. Police determined that his blood alcohol level was approximately triple the legal limit, and that there were also trace amounts of cocaine in his system. At the time of the accident, Probert had been ruled an unrestricted free agent. On July 19, the Red Wings announced that they would not offer him a contract. "This is the end," said senior vice-president Jim Devellano. "[In] my 12 years with the organization ... we've never spent more time on one player and his problems than we have on Probert."

=== Chicago Blackhawks (1995–2002) ===
Probert signed with the Chicago Blackhawks on July 23, 1994, but was placed on inactive status by commissioner Gary Bettman in September 1994 while Probert entered rehab following his July 15 crash and subsequent drunk-driving charge. As a result, Probert sat out the lockout-shortened 1994–95 season before joining the Blackhawks.

Probert's first season with the Blackhawks was the last in which he accumulated over 40 points in a season. From then on, his points and penalty minutes gradually decreased. While he never returned to the levels of point production he achieved with the Red Wings, he remained a physical force on the ice and continued many long-term rivalries with other enforcers.

Probert also sustained various injuries during his time with the Blackhawks, most notably a torn rotator cuff injury which caused him to miss most of the 1997–98 season. One of the more noteworthy occurrences of his career with Chicago is that he scored the final NHL goal at the historic Maple Leaf Gardens on February 13, 1999.

=== Fighting ===
Probert often saw it as his job to protect his teammates, especially Detroit captain Steve Yzerman. In a 2007 news story, he recalled a time that he sucker-punched enforcer Kevin Maguire of the Buffalo Sabres (December 23, 1987) after Maguire attacked Yzerman. Maguire then unsuccessfully attempted to avoid Probert.

Some significant tilts in Probert's career include:

- A long-standing rivalry with the Toronto Maple Leafs' Wendel Clark.
- Two long fights with Craig Coxe of the Vancouver Canucks in the mid-1980s.
- A career-spanning series of battles with Tie Domi of the New York Rangers, Winnipeg Jets and Toronto Maple Leafs. One of Probert's memorable confrontations was also the genesis of Domi's now-infamous belt gesture, where he gestured to the Madison Square Garden crowd as if he had a championship title belt around his waist, with Domi remarking it to reporters, "He's been heavyweight champ for a long time. I still respect him. I'd been wanting him for three years. I just hope he remembered what got him where he is."
- A career-spanning series of fights with longtime enforcer Stu Grimson, including a fight in December 1993 when the Mighty Ducks of Anaheim made their first visit to Detroit.
- A memorable fight on December 17, 1993, with former teammate Joey Kocur of the Rangers, during a brawl involving several players from both teams. Probert and Kocur had grabbed the nearest opposing player without realizing who it was, and continued trading punches even after they identified each other. Later on in Probert's career, he would face Kocur a few more times when he was with the Chicago Blackhawks.
- A fight on February 4, 1994, against Marty McSorley, then of the Pittsburgh Penguins, lasting nearly 100 seconds.
- Several bouts against Montreal and Vancouver enforcer Donald Brashear.
- In a game against the Colorado Avalanche on January 12, 1999, Scott Parker, an aspiring enforcer, skated up to Probert and bared his fists; challenging him to a fight. Parker was at this time heavier, taller and more than ten years younger than Probert. After circling around each other for several seconds the two grabbed each other's jerseys. However the fight was called off after just 11 seconds when Parker was nearly knocked unconscious from four right hands from Probert without throwing one of his own.
- Fought Jody Shelley in each of the three periods in a 2–1 Blackhawks win over the Columbus Blue Jackets at the United Center on January 10, 2002. The three fights by the same two adversaries in a single NHL match would next be achieved fourteen years later when Evander Kane and Alex Petrovic did it on February 9, 2016.

=== Community involvement ===
He actively supported young hockey players in the community, and often bought tickets for kids who couldn't afford to go to Red Wings games. He encouraged a young fan in 1989 to pursue sobriety and challenged him to a contest in which he predicted he would surpass him. By August 18, 2011, that man had been sober for 23 years.

=== Retirement ===
After the 2001–2002 season, Probert was placed on waivers by the Blackhawks. Because he was not picked up by another team, he was advised that his role with the Blackhawks would be limited, or even relegated to playing in the minor leagues again. On November 16, 2002, Probert opted to "unofficially" retire so that he could join the Blackhawks radio broadcasting team. He had finished fourth on the NHL's all-time list with 3,300 penalty minutes.

His stint with the Blackhawks radio team did not last long. In February 2003, it was reported that Probert went back to rehab. During the 2003 offseason, Probert formally announced his retirement.

== Post-retirement ==
=== In media ===
Probert, along with former teammate Joe Kocur, is featured in a book entitled Bruise Brothers by Bob Duff.

=== Literary works ===
Before his death, Probert had been working on a memoir with Kirstie McLellan Day, co-writer of Theo Fleury's bestselling autobiography Playing with Fire. Probert's widow, Dani, decided to honour his wishes to tell his story and continue with completion of the book. Tough Guy: My Life on the Edge was published October 26, 2010, by HarperCollins Canada.

In 2019 the book Facing Bob Probert was published by The Hockey News reporter Scoop Malinowski, a compilation of interviews with NHL players who discussed memories of competing against and fighting Probert in the NHL.

=== Hockey-related appearances ===
Probert routinely appeared in charity games, spoke at conventions, and conducted youth clinics. His activities as a Red Wings alumnus were somewhat limited by the fact that, due to his criminal history, he required an immigration waiver each time he wanted to cross the border.

On January 2, 2007, Probert appeared along with many other former Red Wings teammates to honor the retiring of Steve Yzerman's number 19 at Joe Louis Arena. He wore his number 24 Red Wings jersey, and helped former teammate Vladimir Konstantinov onto the ice for the ceremony. The Detroit crowd gave him a very warm welcome, which he later said he appreciated. He stayed on to watch the game with Joey Kocur behind the penalty box.

This was noted as a possible reconciliation with the Red Wings organization. Apparently it worked, as Probert became a late addition to a January 27, 2007, Red Wings alumni game against the Boston Bruins alumni at Joe Louis Arena. He scored a goal and had two assists, though the Red Wings alumni lost the game 8–6.

Probert worked on the Mike Myers 2008 film The Love Guru, making a cameo as a hockey player. He commented on the irony of being given jersey number 28 to wear in the film — the same number worn by longtime rival Tie Domi.

In 2009, Probert participated in the Canadian figure skating reality television show Battle of the Blades which features figure skating pairs of male hockey players and female figure skaters competing against other pairs. Probert was partnered with Kristina Lenko.

=== Legal problems ===
On June 4, 2004, Probert was arrested for allegedly parking his BMW sport utility vehicle on the wrong side of the street and entering into an altercation over drugs with bystanders. Several police officers intervened and had to subdue Probert with taser and stun guns. He was later acquitted on all charges related to this incident.

On July 1, 2005, Probert was arrested at his Windsor-area (Lakeshore) home for breach of peace, resisting arrest, and assaulting a police officer. Probert's attorney, Patrick Ducharme, advised the media, "I anticipate he will be pleading not guilty and going to trial." Probert was arrested again on August 23, 2005, at a bar in Tecumseh, Ontario, for violating two conditions of his bail conditions that he not consume alcohol or be in an establishment that serves liquor. He was released after paying $200 CAD bail. All charges stemming from the arrest on July 1 were eventually dropped.

== Death ==
Bob Probert died of a heart attack on July 5, 2010. During a severe heat wave, while boating on Lake St. Clair with his children, father-in-law, and mother-in-law, Probert developed what was described as "severe chest pain" and collapsed at approximately 2:00 pm local time. His stepfather-in-law, Dan Parkinson, the Cornwall, Ontario chief of police, attempted CPR to save his life. He was rushed to Windsor Regional Hospital's Metropolitan Campus with no vital signs. Efforts to revive him were unsuccessful, and he was pronounced dead later that afternoon.

Funeral services were held July 9, 2010, in Windsor, Ontario, and attended by several former teammates and opponents, including Dino Ciccarelli, Tie Domi, Chris Nilan, Gerard Gallant, Doug Gilmour, Stu Grimson, Joey Kocur, Petr Klima, Brad McCrimmon, Darren McCarty, and Steve Yzerman, as well as Red Wings general manager Ken Holland and owners Mike and Marian Ilitch. Yzerman delivered the eulogy. In recognition of Probert's love of motorcycle riding, his funeral procession was led by a group of 54 motorcyclists, and his casket was transported on a custom-built motorcycle sidecar. Probert is survived by his wife, Dani, and four children.

Probert's family announced, on September 25, 2010, that his brain would be donated to the Sports Legacy Institute to assist researchers who are studying the effects of concussions and other sports-related head injuries. In March 2011, it was reported that researchers at Boston University had found evidence of chronic traumatic encephalopathy in Probert's brain.

On Sunday April 9, 2017, Probert's family spread his ashes in the Red Wings penalty box at Joe Louis Arena's final game.

== Personal life ==
Probert married Danielle Wood in 1993. They had four children. He had an older brother, Norm, who also played hockey. Norm never played in the NHL, but it is mentioned in the 2018 documentary Tough Guy: The Bob Probert Story that Norm "briefly played in Czechoslovakia."

== Career statistics ==
Bold indicates led league

			Regular season					Playoffs
Season	Team	League	GP	G	A	Pts	PIM	GP	G	A	Pts	PIM
1981–82	Windsor Club 240	OMHA	55	60	40	100	40	—	—	—	—	—
1982–83	Brantford Alexanders	OHL	51	12	16	28	133	8	2	2	4	23
1983–84	Brantford Alexanders	OHL	65	35	38	73	189	6	0	3	3	16
1984–85	Hamilton Steelhawks	OHL	4	0	1	1	21	—	—	—	—	—
1984–85	Sault Ste. Marie Greyhounds	OHL	44	20	52	72	172	15	6	11	17	60
1984–85	Sault Ste. Marie Greyhounds	MC	—	—	—	—	—	4	1	2	3	34
1985–86	Adirondack Red Wings	AHL	32	12	15	27	152	10	2	3	5	68
1985–86	Detroit Red Wings	NHL	44	8	13	21	186	—	—	—	—	—
1986–87	Adirondack Red Wings	AHL	7	1	4	5	15	—	—	—	—	—
1986–87	Detroit Red Wings	NHL	63	13	11	24	221	16	3	4	7	63
1987–88	Detroit Red Wings	NHL	74	29	33	62	**398**	16	8	13	21	51
1988–89	Detroit Red Wings	NHL	25	4	2	6	106	—	—	—	—	—
1989–90	Detroit Red Wings	NHL	4	3	0	3	29	—	—	—	—	—
1990–91	Detroit Red Wings	NHL	55	16	23	39	315	6	1	2	3	50
1991–92	Detroit Red Wings	NHL	63	20	24	44	276	11	1	6	7	28
1992–93	Detroit Red Wings	NHL	80	14	29	43	292	7	0	3	3	10
1993–94	Detroit Red Wings	NHL	66	7	10	17	275	7	1	1	2	8
1995–96	Chicago Blackhawks	NHL	78	19	21	40	237	10	0	2	2	23
1996–97	Chicago Blackhawks	NHL	82	9	14	23	326	6	2	1	3	41
1997–98	Chicago Blackhawks	NHL	14	2	1	3	48	—	—	—	—	—
1998–99	Chicago Blackhawks	NHL	78	7	14	21	206	—	—	—	—	—
1999–2000	Chicago Blackhawks	NHL	68	4	11	15	114	—	—	—	—	—
2000–01	Chicago Blackhawks	NHL	79	7	12	19	103	—	—	—	—	—
2001–02	Chicago Blackhawks	NHL	61	1	3	4	176	2	0	0	0	0
NHL totals			935	163	221	384	3,300	81	16	32	48	274

== Records ==
- Detroit Red Wings franchise record for career penalty minutes (2,090).
- Detroit Red Wings franchise record for penalty minutes in a season (398 in 1987–88).
- 5th all time in penalty minutes (3,300).

== See also ==
- List of NHL players with 2000 career penalty minutes
