= Kirstie McLellan Day =

Canadian author, journalist and former television host

Kirstie McLellan Day (born September 24, 1963) is a Canadian author, journalist and former television host.

McLellan Day was the CEO of Pyramid Productions. McLellan Day served as executive producer and writer on the true-crime series The Shocking Truth and Sex, Lies & Murder, made in conjunction with U.S. broadcaster Reelz.

Since focusing on writing, Kirstie McLellan Day has become one of Canada's most successful authors.

== Early life ==
Kirstie McLellan was born and raised in Regina, Saskatchewan, and at the University of Regina, she studied drama. After moving to Alberta, she was primarily involved in covering entertainment drama. Among her many jobs: columnist for the Calgary Herald; private detective; investigative journalist; television host; producer and CEO of Pyramid Productions Television, which produced Inside Entertainment for Global TV and Inside Movies for Movie Central; writing biographies for A&E Biography Channel in New York. In 2001, McLellan Day wrote her first book No Remorse: A Father's Murderous Rage. The book profiled Al Dolejs, who murdered his two children in a vicious act of revenge.

== Broadcast ==
McLellan Day's work in radio soon led to television job with Calgary CTV affiliate CFCN-DT. McLellan Day became a reporter/host of the news magazine show FYI. From there, she moved on to co-host The Movie Show with her husband and business partner Larry Day.The Movie Show was produced by the couple's media company Pyramid Productions. The program was broadcast across Canada and syndicated to more than 70 countries. McLellan Day also worked as a weekly entertainment columnist for the Calgary Herald.

McLellan Day went on to create, produce and host the true-crime investigative journalism TV series The Criminal Mind.

== Writing ==
In the past 10 years, McLellan Day has written seven bestselling Canadian Books of the past decade.

Her second book was the controversial autobiography Under the Mat profiling the tumultuous life of Diana Hart, sister of wrestling legend Bret Hart, and former wife of "The British Bulldog" Davey Boy Smith.

McLellan Day documented another high-profile family with Above and Beyond: The JR Shaw Family History in Life and Business. The book chronicled the history of the Shaw family, who made their fortune in the cable television and internet industry.

In 2009, McLellan Day published Playing With Fire, which followed the life of NHL superstar Theoren Fleury. The book broke the story of the sexual abuse Fleury survived at the hands of his junior hockey coach Graham James. Playing With Fire sold more than 80,000 copies within six weeks of its release and became a bestseller. The book led to a one-man play (written by McLellan Day) and an HBO documentary.

McLellan Day profiled another troubled NHL superstar with her second hockey book Tough Guy. She partnered with NHL enforcer Bob Probert to recount his personal battles with alcohol and drug addiction. Probert died while collaborating on the book, but with the encouragement of his widow Dani, the book was completed and published on October 26, 2010.

In 2012, partnered with long-time CBC Hockey host Ron MacLean on Cornered, which followed his broadcast career that led him to co-host Don Cherry's Coach's Corner segment on Hockey Night In Canada.

In 2015, McLellan Day reteamed with MacLean on Ron MacLean's Hockey Towns. In 2016, she worked with Wayne Gretzky on 99: Stories of the Game – in which Gretzky recounted memorable and noteworthy hockey stories.

McLellan Day focused her next books on two of the most famous goalies in the NHL. Calling The Shots was the portrait of NHL All-Star-turned-broadcaster Kelly Hrudey. In addition to his accomplishments on the ice, Hrudey also detailed his personal battles with anxiety.

A year later, Cujo: The Untold Story of My Life On and Off the Ice chronicled the life and career of Curtis Joseph. It debuted at #1 in October 2018.

== Published works ==
- No Remorse: A Father's Murderous Rage (2001)
- Under the Mat (with Diana Hart) (2001)
- Above and Beyond the JR Shaw Family History in Life and Business (2004)
- Playing with Fire (with Theo Fleury) (2009)
- Tough Guy: My Life on the Edge (with Bob Probert) (2010)
- Cornered (with Ron MacLean) (2012)
- Hockey Towns: Untold Stories from the Heart of Canada (with Ron MacLean) (2016)
- 99: Stories of the Game (with Wayne Gretzky) (2016)
- Calling the Shots: Downs and Rebounds - My Life in the Great Game of Hockey (with Kelly Hrudey)
- Cujo: The Untold Story of My Life On and Off the Ice (with Curtis Joseph) (2018)
