= Todd Holt =

Canadian ice hockey player

- Born: January 20, 1973 (age 53) Estevan, Saskatchewan, Canada
- Height: 5 ft 6 in (168 cm)
- Weight: 154 lb (70 kg; 11 st 0 lb)
- Position: Right wing
- Shot: Right
- Played for: Kansas City Blades; Roanoke Express; Birmingham Bulls; Fresno Falcons; Heilbronner EC; EC Kapfenberg
- National team: Canada
- NHL draft: 184th overall, 1993; San Jose Sharks
- Playing career: 1989–2009

Todd Holt (born January 20, 1973) is a Canadian former professional hockey player. Holt was drafted 184th overall in the 1993 NHL entry draft by the San Jose Sharks, following a junior career in which Holt had two 100 point seasons. He is the Broncos' all-time leading scorer in points and goals, with 423 points.

== Personal ==
Holt was sexually abused by junior coach Graham James during his time with the Swift Current Broncos. He testified against James, along with fellow victims Fleury and Sheldon Kennedy, during a trial in 2012.

His cousin is former NHL star Theoren Fleury, who was also abused by James.

== Career statistics ==
| | | | Regular season | | | | | Playoffs |
| Season | Team | League | GP | G | A | Pts | PIM | GP | G | A | Pts | PIM |
|---|---|---|---|---|---|---|---|---|---|---|---|---|
| 1989–90 | Swift Current Broncos | WHL | 63 | 26 | 22 | 48 | 29 | 4 | 1 | 0 | 1 | 2 |
| 1990–91 | Swift Current Broncos | WHL | 69 | 47 | 27 | 74 | 72 | 3 | 1 | 0 | 1 | 0 |
| 1991–92 | Swift Current Broncos | WHL | 66 | 47 | 54 | 101 | 155 | 8 | 4 | 5 | 9 | 10 |
| 1992–93 | Swift Current Broncos | WHL | 67 | 56 | 57 | 113 | 90 | 16 | 10 | 12 | 22 | 18 |
| 1993–94 | Swift Current Broncos | WHL | 56 | 40 | 47 | 87 | 59 | 7 | 11 | 7 | 18 | 8 |
| 1994–95 | Kansas City Blades | IHL | 28 | 4 | 4 | 8 | 12 | — | — | — | — | — |
| 1994–95 | Roanoke Express | ECHL | 2 | 0 | 2 | 2 | 0 | — | — | — | — | — |
| 1995–96 | Birmingham Bulls | ECHL | 21 | 11 | 10 | 21 | 18 | — | — | — | — | — |
| 1995–96 | Fresno Falcons | WCHL | 25 | 14 | 14 | 28 | 20 | — | — | — | — | — |
| 1996–97 | Birmingham Bulls | ECHL | 63 | 36 | 31 | 67 | 45 | 8 | 6 | 3 | 9 | 10 |
| 1997–98 | Birmingham Bulls | ECHL | 65 | 21 | 21 | 42 | 49 | 4 | 1 | 0 | 1 | 2 |
| 1998–99 | Heilbronner EC | Germany2 | 56 | 38 | 25 | 63 | 41 | — | — | — | — | — |
| 1999–00 | EC Kapfenberg | Austria2 | 27 | 43 | 38 | 81 | 32 | — | — | — | — | — |
| 2008–09 | Milestone Flyers | QVHL | 7 | 12 | 6 | 18 | 4 | 1 | 0 | 0 | 0 | 0 |
| ECHL totals | | | 151 | 68 | 64 | 132 | 112 | 12 | 7 | 3 | 10 | 12 |
