= Horse Lake Thunder =

Defunct Canadian ice hockey team

- Sport: Ice hockey
- League: North Peace Hockey League
- Location: Canada

Horse Lake Thunder is a defunct men's senior ice hockey team that played in the North Peace Hockey League (NPHL).

== 2004-05 season ==
Former NHL superstar Theoren Fleury played a season with the Horse Lake Thunder in 2004. The 2004 Horse Lake roster also included former NHL players Gino Odjick, Sasha Lakovic and Dody Wood. The Thunder spent millions of dollars on a new arena and players. The team went on to win the championship that season, but in the 2005 Allan Cup the Thunder were defeated in the semi-finals by the Thunder Bay Bombers who went on to win the Allan Cup.
