= I Am Who I Am (album) =

Studio album by Theo Fleury
- Released: October 16, 2015
- Recorded: OCL Studios
- Genre: Country, Alternative
- Length: 32:16
- Label: eOne Music
- Producer: Paddy McCallion

I Am Who I Am is the debut record by former NHL hockey player Theo Fleury, released on October 16, 2015 through eOne Music Canada.

== Track listing ==
No.	Title	Length
1.	"I Am Who I Am"	3:35
2.	"Road To Misery"	3:24
3.	"Bottle of Shame"	1:59
4.	"Farewell"	3:59
5.	"Playing With Fire"	2:36
6.	"Santa Fe Kinda Day"	3:37
7.	"My Life's Been A Country Song"	3:11
8.	"First Rodeo"	3:08
9.	"Sick As Your Secrets"	2:41
10.	"Rattlesnake"	4:06
Total length:		32:16
