= Theoren Fleury =

Canadian ice hockey player (born 1968)

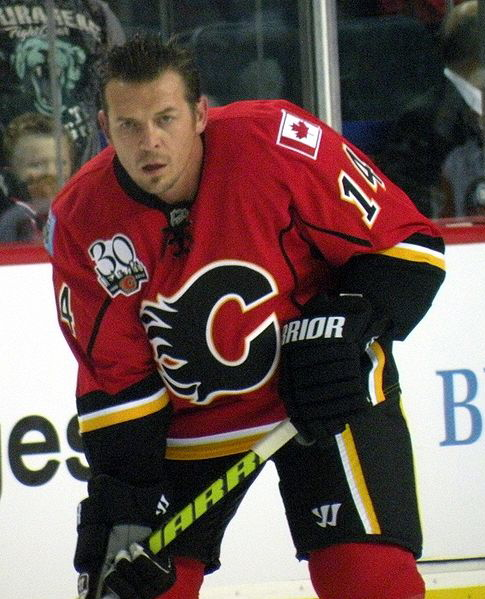
- Fleury with the Calgary Flames in 2009
- Born: 29 June 1968 (age 58) Oxbow, Saskatchewan, Canada
- Height: 5 ft 6 in (168 cm)
- Weight: 180 lb (82 kg; 12 st 12 lb)
- Position: Right wing
- Shot: Right
- Played for: Calgary Flames; Tappara; Colorado Avalanche; New York Rangers; Chicago Blackhawks; Belfast Giants
- NHL draft: 166th overall, 1987; Calgary Flames
- Playing career: 1988–2006
Medal record
Representing Canada
Men's ice hockey
World Junior Championships
Gold medal – first place	1988 Soviet Union	Ice hockey
World Championships
Silver medal – second place	1991 Finland	Ice hockey
Canada Cup
Gold medal – first place	1991 Canada Cup	Ice hockey
World Cup
Silver medal – second place	1996 World Cup of Hockey	Ice hockey
Olympic Games
Gold medal – first place	2002 Salt Lake City	Ice hockey

Theoren Wallace "Theo" Fleury (born 29 June 1968) is a Canadian former professional ice hockey player, author and motivational speaker. Fleury played for the Calgary Flames, Colorado Avalanche, New York Rangers, and Chicago Blackhawks of the National Hockey League (NHL), Tappara of Finland's SM-liiga, and the Belfast Giants of the UK's Elite Ice Hockey League. He was drafted by the Flames in the 8th round, 166th overall, at the 1987 NHL entry draft, and played over 1,000 games in the NHL between 1989 and 2003.

One of the smallest players of his generation, Fleury played a physical style that often led to altercations. As a junior, he was at the centre of the infamous Punch-up in Piestany, a brawl that resulted in the disqualification of both Canada and the Soviet Union from the 1987 World Junior Ice Hockey Championships. Once considered unlikely to play in the NHL due to his small size, Fleury scored over 1,000 points in his career, placing him 61st in career NHL scoring and won the Stanley Cup in 1989 with the Flames. During his career Fleury recorded 90+ points three times, and 100+ points twice. He averaged 1.026 points per game in the Stanley Cup playoffs, 32nd best in league history. He twice represented Canada at the Winter Olympics, winning a gold medal in 2002. Throughout his career, he battled drug and alcohol addictions that ultimately forced him out of the NHL in 2003. He played one season in the British Elite Ice Hockey League in 2005–06, and made two attempts to win the Allan Cup. After an unsuccessful NHL comeback attempt with the Flames, he retired in 2009.

Outside of hockey, Fleury overcame his addictions, operated a concrete business in Calgary with his family, and filmed a pilot for a reality television show about it. He marketed his own brand of clothing, which led him to play two professional baseball games for the Calgary Vipers of the Golden Baseball League. In 1995, he was diagnosed with Crohn's disease, and his annual charity golf tournament has helped raise more than $1 million for the Crohn's and Colitis Foundation of Canada.

Fleury co-wrote Playing with Fire, a best-selling autobiography released in October 2009, in which he revealed that he had been sexually abused by former coach Graham James. Fleury filed a criminal complaint against James, who subsequently pleaded guilty to charges of sexual assault. Fleury has since become an advocate for sexual abuse victims and developed a career as a public speaker. He was a recipient of the Indspire Award in the sports category in 2013. Additionally, Theoren hosts the "Theo Fleury 14 Hockey Camp" which helps to teach, inspire and educate young hockey players ages 6 to 16. Moreover, Fleury travelled to Vancouver in 2013 where he assisted and co-hosted the 19th Annual Aboriginal Achievement Awards.

== Early life ==
Fleury was born on 29 June 1968, in Oxbow, Saskatchewan, the first of Wally and Donna Fleury's three sons. Wally was a hockey player whose dreams of a professional career ended when he broke his leg playing baseball in the summer of 1963; the injury helped fuel a drinking problem. Donna was a quiet, religious woman who battled drug addiction for many years. Fleury is of Métis heritage and his grandmother Mary was Cree. Fleury was subject to racism for being of Metis descent throughout his playing career. The Fleurys lived in Williams Lake, British Columbia, for four years, a period that saw Theo's brother Ted born in 1970, before settling in Russell, Manitoba, by 1973, the year his youngest brother Travis was born. Wally worked as a truck driver and maintenance worker at the arena in Russell. Fleury and his family shared a passion for music. One of his fondest memories when he was a child was listening to his grandfather play the fiddle. Fleury's father was a talented man who could play a variety of instruments, such as the piano and guitar. This passion for music brought happiness and joy to Theoren and his family as it was a part of their Metis heritage growing up.

Always one of the smallest children in his class and without stable supervision at home, Fleury adopted an aggressive posture and later described himself as a bully. He turned to hockey as an outlet when he borrowed an old pair of skates and a broken stick to play his first game at the age of five. From that point on, he played hockey at every opportunity, often accompanying his father to the arena in Russell in the pre-dawn hours. He was described by his teachers as a determined youth, who would repeat any activity he failed at until he got it right.

Although his mother was a Jehovah's Witness, Fleury was raised as a Catholic. He attended Mass from age 6 to 12, serving as an altar boy until the church's priest died of a heart attack, depriving Fleury of one of his early positive influences.

Always lacking money and stable home life, Fleury received support from the hockey community, in particular the Peltz family in Russell, who ensured that he and his brothers were fed and bought them new clothes when required. In January 1982, Fleury's dreams of playing in the NHL nearly ended at the age of 13 when, during a game, he suffered a deep cut under his arm that severed his brachial artery. He missed nearly a year of contact hockey as a result. Five months after the incident, the community raised money to send him to the Andy Murray Hockey School in Brandon, Manitoba. It was there that Fleury met Graham James, who was working as a scout for the Winnipeg Warriors of the Western Hockey League (WHL). James told Fleury that he had the skill to play in the NHL despite his size, and promised to recruit him to play junior hockey for the Warriors when he was old enough.

== Playing career ==
=== Junior ===
Fleury began his junior career in 1983–84 as a 15-year-old with the St. James Canadians of the Manitoba Junior Hockey League, scoring 33 goals and 64 points in 22 games, an incredible pace of nearly three points per game. In 1984–85 he moved to the Moose Jaw Warriors, who had just relocated from Winnipeg, scoring 29 goals and 75 points in 71 games as a 16-year-old. He improved his totals in each of his four years in the WHL, culminating with a 68-goal, 92-assist season in 1987–88. Fleury's 160 points tied him for the league lead with Joe Sakic, and the two players shared the Bob Clarke Trophy as the WHL's top scorers. Fleury's 92 assists and 160 points remain team records; he also holds the Warriors' career records for goals (201), assists (271) and points (472). As of 2024, he remains 10th all-time in WHL scoring.

Always one of the smallest players in the game, Fleury learned early that he had to play an unpredictable style of game to survive against players much larger than he was. He found that the best way to protect himself was to intimidate his opponents by playing a feisty, physical game, which he said led to many retaliatory penalties and several arguments with his coaches. He recorded 235 minutes in penalties in his final year of junior, nearly 100 more than any of the other top 10 WHL scorers. Fleury retained this style of play throughout his hockey career, routinely surprising opponents who felt their size was an advantage.

"The boys are up for the gold medal. Everybody is so tense. Tempers are flying. It's really tough out there... I can't believe it. It's so tense. It's so tense."

— Fleury describes atmosphere of Canada's game vs. the Soviet Union to the Canadian Broadcasting Corporation during the first intermission, prior to the brawl.

Fleury twice represented Canada at the World Junior Hockey Championships. He first joined the team for the 1987 tournament in Piešťany, Czechoslovakia. The tournament is best remembered for the "Punch-up in Piestany" on 4 January 1987, an infamous bench-clearing brawl between the Canadians and the Soviet Union. Fleury scored the first goal of the game and, as part of his celebration, used his stick to mimic firing a machine gun at the Soviet bench, a move that was criticized by Canadian officials. The brawl began early in the second period with Canada leading 4–2, when Pavel Kostichkin slashed Fleury, leading to a fight between the two. It quickly escalated into a line brawl involving all skaters on the ice, after which the Soviet players left their bench, followed closely by the Canadians. Both teams were disqualified from the tournament, costing Fleury and the Canadians a medal – potentially the gold.

The International Ice Hockey Federation suspended all players involved in the brawl from participating in international tournaments for 18 months, though the bans were later reduced to 6 months on appeal. This reduction allowed Fleury to participate in the 1988 tournament in Moscow. He was named captain, finished second in team scoring with eight points in seven games, and was named a tournament all-star as Canada won the gold medal.

Although he scored 129 points for the Warriors in 1986–87, Fleury's small stature led many teams to doubt that he could play in the NHL. The Calgary Flames drafted him in the 8th round, 166th overall, of the 1987 NHL entry draft. Upon completing his junior season in 1988, Fleury signed his first professional contract, worth C$415,000, and joined the Flames' International Hockey League (IHL) affiliate, the Salt Lake Golden Eagles. He scored seven points in two regular season games, then 16 more in eight playoff games as the Eagles won the Turner Cup championship.

=== Calgary Flames ===
Fleury arrived at the Flames' 1988 training camp 20 pounds (9.1 kg) overweight, and was assigned back to Salt Lake to begin the 1988–89 season. He averaged nearly two points per game, recording 37 goals and 37 assists to lead the IHL in scoring after 40 games. Mired in a slump, the Flames recalled Fleury on 1 January 1989, in the hope he could help their offence. He played his first NHL game against the Quebec Nordiques two nights later and recorded his first points – three assists – on 5 January against the Los Angeles Kings. He scored his first two NHL goals in a 7–2 victory over the Edmonton Oilers on 7 January. Fleury continued to score, and finished with 34 points in 36 games in his NHL rookie season. He added 11 points in the playoffs, helping the Flames to the first Stanley Cup championship in franchise history.

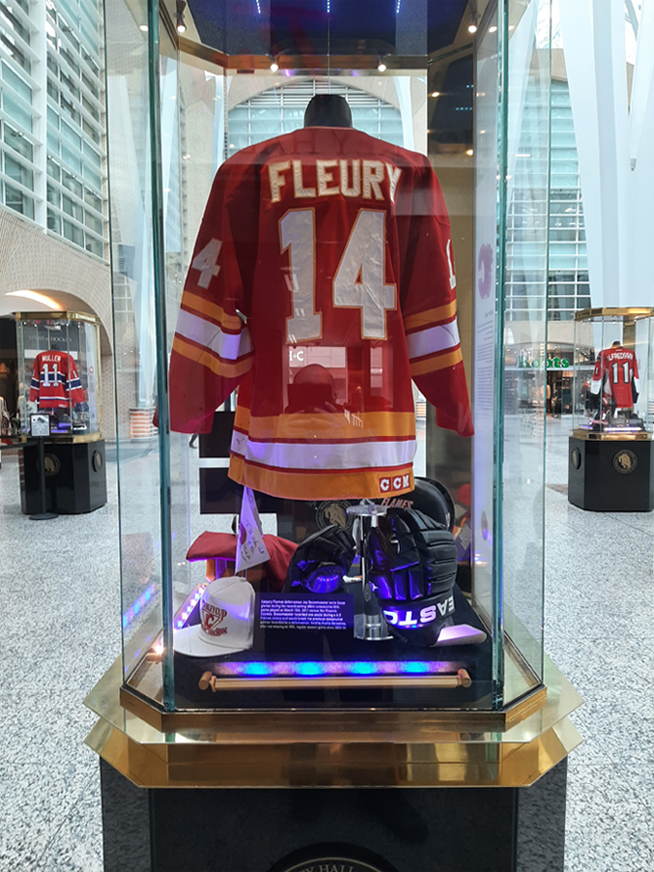
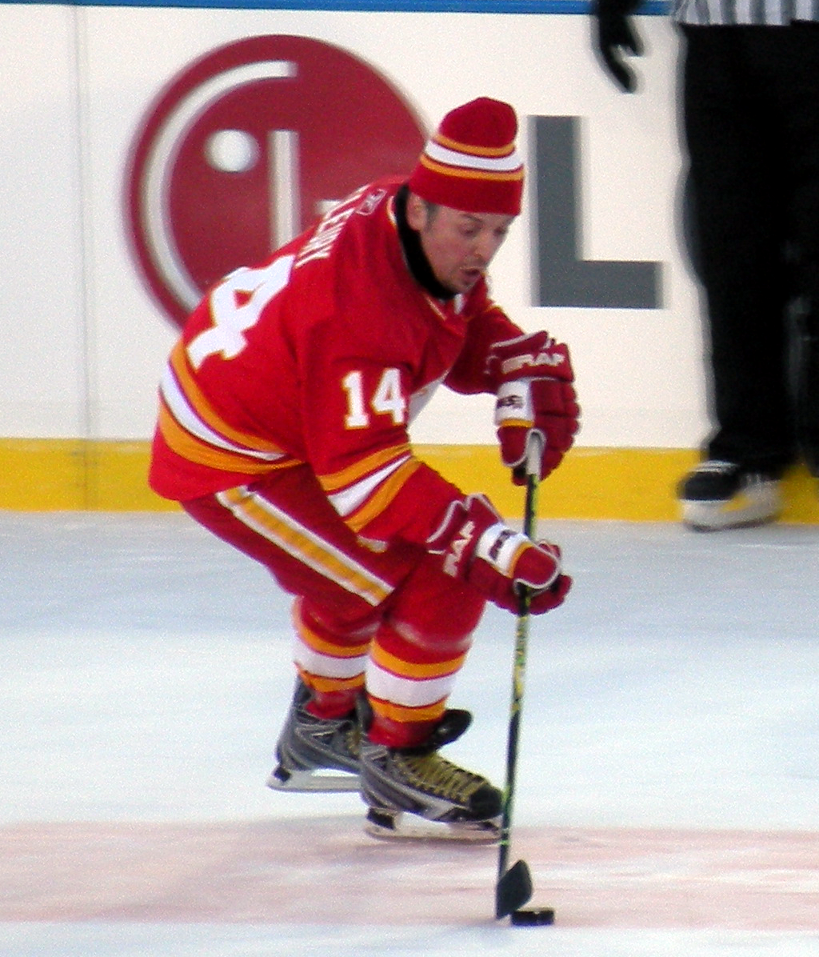
Fleury's 1990–91 jersey in the Hockey Hall of Fame (left) and him handling the puck during the alumni game at the 2011 Heritage Classic (right).

After improving to 33 goals in his first full season, Fleury broke out in 1990–91, scoring 51 goals and 104 points to lead the Flames offensively. He played in the 1991 All-Star Game, scoring a goal in an 11–5 victory by the Campbell Conference over the Wales Conference. Towards the end of the season, Fleury set a league record by scoring three shorthanded goals in one game against the St. Louis Blues. He shared the NHL Plus-Minus Award with Marty McSorley, whom he tied for the league lead with +48. Fleury scored only two goals in the 1991 Stanley Cup Playoffs, but after his overtime winner in game six against the Oilers he famously slid the entire length of the ice in jubilation before crashing into the boards as his teammates attempted to catch up to him. CBC Hockey Night in Canada play-by-play announcer Chris Cuthbert called Fleury's goal in a dramatic fashion:

Messier gives it away! HERE'S FLEURY! LOOKING FOR HIS FIRST GOAL OF THE SERIES... SCORES! And Theoren Fleury and the Flames are in seventh heaven!"

Unfortunately, the Flames were defeated in game seven by an overtime goal from Esa Tikkanen, in which Tikkanen scored a hat-trick to end the Flames season.

Fleury fell back to 33 goals in 1991–92 as the Flames missed the playoffs. That season, he made his second All-Star Game appearance, recording a goal for the Campbell Conference. Fleury finished with over 100 points for the second time in his career in 1992–93 to lead the team in scoring, and set a franchise record by going +9 in a 13–1 victory over the San Jose Sharks on 10 February 1993, in which he scored six points.

The 1994–95 NHL lockout reduced the season to 48 games from 84. During the lockout, Fleury played for Tappara in Finland's top league, the SM-liiga. He recorded 17 points in ten games before the NHL's labour dispute was resolved, bringing him back to Calgary. Late in the season, Fleury recorded two goals and an assist against the Oilers on 31 March 1995, to surpass 500 career points.

Lacking a contract prior to the 1995–96 season, Fleury staged a brief hold-out during training camp before signing a five-year, $12 million deal with the Flames. He agreed to take less money than he could have received on the open market out of loyalty to the franchise that had given him his NHL opportunity. He missed much of the preseason with a stomach ailment, but joined the team for the season opener. Although he felt like somebody was "stabbing a knife in [his] gut every five minutes", Fleury had played every game for the Flames when he revealed in December 1995 that he had been diagnosed with Crohn's disease and doctors had finally found the correct medication to control it. Despite the ailment, Fleury led the team in goals, assists, and points, and played in his third All-Star Game, serving as Calgary's only representative.

When Joe Nieuwendyk refused to report to the Flames prior to the 1995–96 season, they named Fleury interim captain. The title was made permanent when Nieuwendyk was traded in December. Fleury was reluctant to assume the captaincy, but did so out of loyalty to the team and because there was nobody else capable of taking on the role. He relinquished it two seasons later after deciding that it was harming his play and affecting his relationship with his teammates and coach Pierre Pagé.

The Flames struggled in 1996–97, finishing last in the Pacific Division and missing the playoffs for only the second time since their arrival in Calgary in 1980. Fleury again led the team in scoring, but his 29 goals were the fewest he had scored in a full season in the NHL. He was the Flames' lone representative at the 1997 All-Star Game. He scored only 27 goals in 1997–98, but increased his point total from 67 to 78 while also leading the team with 197 penalties in minutes. On 29 November 1997, Fleury scored his 315th career goal, breaking Nieuwendyk's franchise record. The same day, he was named to Team Canada for the 1998 Winter Olympics. Fleury participated in his fifth All-Star Game that season, but the Flames again missed the playoffs.

"A piece of my heart left today, but the biggest part is here in Calgary and always will be."

— An emotional Fleury discusses the trade that ended his 11-year career with the Flames.

On 19 February 1999, he surpassed Al MacInnis as the franchise scoring leader with his 823rd career point. He held the record for 10 years until surpassed by Jarome Iginla in 2009. The Flames, who had been struggling financially and were unable to sign Fleury to a new contract, chose to trade him less than two weeks after he broke the record rather than risk losing him to free agency. He was dealt to the Colorado Avalanche on 28 February for René Corbet, Wade Belak, and Robyn Regehr. Although it was expected, the trade nonetheless stunned fans in Calgary. His popularity was such that during a game in 1999, after Fleury was sent off the ice to change a bloody jersey, a fan threw his own souvenir jersey over the boards so that Fleury would not miss a shift. He put the jersey on before realizing it was autographed and handed it back.

The trade was viewed as another sign that small-market Canadian teams could no longer compete in the NHL. The economics of hockey had changed such that the Flames felt that they had to deal their top player despite being just two points out of a playoff spot. However, with Fleury due to become an unrestricted free agent at the end of the season, the Flames did not want to chance losing him without getting anything in return. Following the trade, Fleury said that any team looking to sign him to a new contract would have to pay him $7 million per year. In his autobiography, Playing with Fire, Fleury claims that he was offered $16 million over four years by the Flames before the trade, and countered with an offer of $25 million over five years.

=== Colorado, New York, and Chicago ===
Fleury made his debut for the Avalanche the day after the trade and was met with loud cheers from the Denver crowd. He scored a goal in a 4–3 loss to Edmonton, but also sprained his knee and missed the next two weeks. He had missed only seven games during his 11-year career in Calgary. He played in 15 regular-season games for the Avalanche, scoring 10 goals and 14 assists, and another 5 goals and 12 assists in 18 playoff games before the Avalanche were eliminated by the Dallas Stars in the Western Conference Finals.

The Avalanche chose not to re-sign Fleury, and he joined the New York Rangers on a three-year contract worth $21 million that included a club option for a fourth year at $7 million. He touched off a wave of anger on signing with the Rangers when he claimed he was unappreciated in Calgary, comments he later stated were directed at the Flames' owners and not the team's fans, who he said always supported him. Fleury's first year in Manhattan was a disappointment. He scored only 15 goals in 1999–2000, struggling under the pressure of trying to lead the Rangers into the playoffs and adapting to life in New York. After the season, he voluntarily entered a league-operated program that treats substance abuse and emotional problems, though he denied that either had any effect on his play.

Fleury rebounded to score 30 goals in 2000–01 and participated in his seventh All-Star Game. He scored his 400th NHL goal on 4 November 2000, in a 5–2 victory over the Montreal Canadiens. Fleury was leading his team, and was fourth in the league, with 74 points in 62 games, when the Rangers announced that he had again entered the league's substance abuse program. The decision ended his season.

Prior to the 2001–02 season Fleury said that he continued to struggle with substance abuse and had difficulty adapting to life in Manhattan after growing up in a Canadian prairie town of 1,500. He played all 82 games in 2001–02, but his problems affected his behavior on the ice. After receiving a major and game misconduct penalty in a game against the San Jose Sharks on 28 December, he wound up in a confrontation with the Sharks' mascot, S.J. Sharkie, in a hallway of the HP Pavilion, reportedly breaking the rib of the mascot portrayer. Fleury himself later downplayed the incident, saying that he "nudged" Sharkie. Upon taking a penalty in a January 2002 game against the Pittsburgh Penguins, Fleury left the arena rather than skate to the penalty box. He later apologized to his teammates, claiming he was deeply stressed by family problems. Two weeks later, he was fined $1,000 for making an obscene gesture to fans of the New York Islanders who had been taunting him over his drug use. Towards the end of February, he lashed out against the league's officials. He claimed they were not judging him fairly, and threatened to retire. The league dismissed his complaints. He did achieve a personal milestone during the season, however: on 27 October 2001, Fleury assisted on a goal by Mike York, scoring the 1,000th point of his NHL career. The Rangers presented him with a silver stick in honour of the achievement.

Following the season, the Rangers did not exercise their option, and traded Fleury's playing rights to the San Jose Sharks, which entitled the Sharks to a compensatory draft pick if Fleury signed elsewhere. He did so with a two-year, $8.5 million contract with the Chicago Blackhawks. Two days prior to the opening of the 2002–03 season, he was suspended by the NHL for violating the terms of the league's substance abuse program. The Blackhawks hired one of Fleury's friends, also a recovering alcoholic, to ensure that he attended Alcoholics Anonymous meetings and abided by the terms of the NHL's aftercare program.

Fleury missed the first two months of the season before being reinstated. While out with teammates in January 2003, he was involved in a drunken brawl with bouncers at a strip club in Columbus, Ohio, that left him bloodied; he has no memory of the night and described it as among the lowest points of his life. He was not suspended, but the incident contributed to a collapse in the standings by the Blackhawks, and they placed him on waivers in March. No team claimed him, and Fleury finished the season with the Blackhawks, recording 12 goals and 21 assists in 54 games. Following the season, in April 2003, he was suspended again by the league for violations of its substance abuse program. The suspension ended his NHL career.

=== Senior hockey and the Belfast Giants ===
In January 2005, Fleury announced that he had joined his cousin Todd Holt and former NHL players Gino Odjick, Sasha Lakovic and Dody Wood in playing for the Horse Lake Thunder of the North Peace Hockey League for the Allan Cup, Canada's national senior amateur championship. He also hoped to serve as a role model for kids on the Horse Lake First Nation. Hockey Alberta initially ruled that he was ineligible to play senior hockey in 2004–05 because he had been signed to a professional contract during the 2003–04 season. Hockey Alberta denied an appeal, citing a new policy it had put in effect to prevent NHL players from joining senior teams during the 2004–05 NHL lockout. It reversed its decision on a second appeal after the NHL and National Hockey League Players' Association both agreed that Fleury was a free agent, and not a locked-out player. Fleury played his first game for the Thunder on 22 January 2005, scoring a goal and two assists.

Fleury remained embroiled in controversy at the 2005 Allan Cup tournament. The Thunder were repeatedly accused of paying players despite being an amateur team, and Fleury angrily denied rumours that he was secretly being paid $100,000. Tournament fans were extremely hostile towards the Thunder, and after they were eliminated in the semi-finals Fleury accused them of racism and threatened to return his 2002 Olympic gold medal: "The one thing that's really bothered me through this whole thing is the prejudice, still, in this country when it comes to native people. I've seen it first-hand in every building we go into, how these people are treated, and it's absolutely embarrassing to be a Canadian and know that stuff is still going on."

Fleury was convinced by a friend to move to the United Kingdom to play with the Belfast Giants of the Elite Ice Hockey League (EIHL) for the 2005–06 season. He scored three goals and added four assists and a fight in his first game, against the Edinburgh Capitals. He scored 22 goals and 52 assists in 34 games, as Belfast won the regular season league title. Described as the "most talented" player ever to play in the United Kingdom, Fleury was named the EIHL's Player of the Year and voted a first team All-Star by the British Ice Hockey Writers Association. Fleury argued with visiting fans, as well as officials, which led him not to return to Belfast in 2006–07.

In late 2008, Fleury joined his brother Ted with the Steinbach North Stars in a second bid to win the Allan Cup. He played 13 league games, scoring eight goals and 19 assists. At the 2009 Allan Cup tournament, he recorded a goal and an assist to lead the host North Stars to a 5–0 win in their opening game, and finished tied for the lead in tournament scoring at seven points. The North Stars lost the semi-finals to the South East Prairie Thunder, 4–2.

=== NHL comeback attempt ===
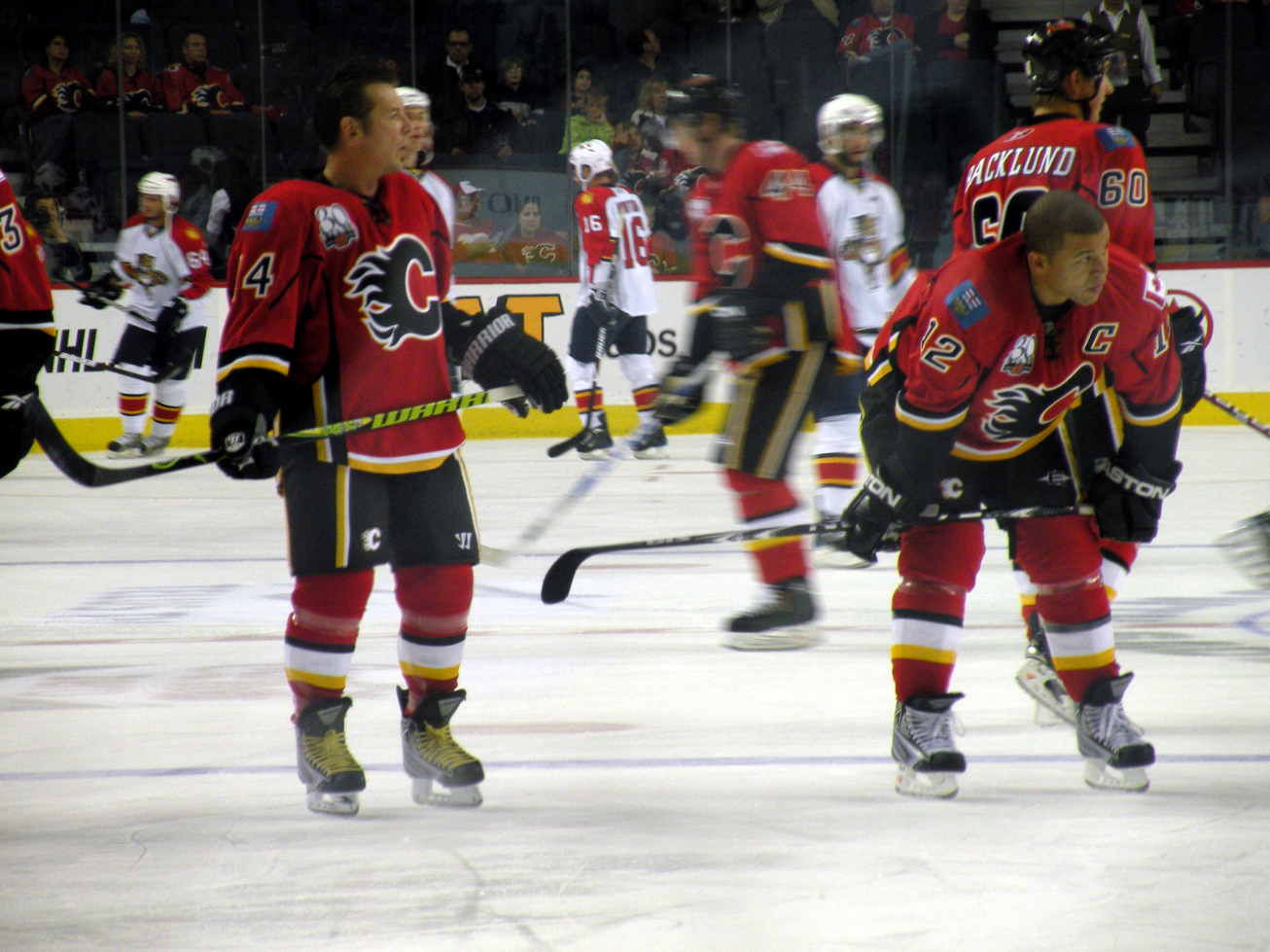
Fleury stands beside Jarome Iginla prior to a game. Fleury was the Flames' all-time scoring leader for ten years until he was passed by Iginla in 2009.

Unhappy with how his NHL career ended, Fleury hired a personal trainer in February 2009 and began an attempt to return to the NHL. By August, he petitioned Commissioner Gary Bettman to lift his suspension. He was reinstated on 10 September following a meeting with Bettman, Deputy Commissioner Bill Daly and league doctors. Fleury then accepted a try-out offer from the Flames. He said he wanted to prove to himself that he could still play at the NHL level, though his skeptics pointed to his child support payments and the failure of his concrete business, as well as the planned release of his autobiography, and argued Fleury's comeback was financially motivated.

He made his return to the NHL in an exhibition game in Calgary against the New York Islanders on 17 September on a line with Daymond Langkow and Nigel Dawes. Fleury was met with loud cheers throughout the game, and scored the only goal in a shootout to give the Flames a 5–4 win. After the game, he saluted the crowd as the fans chanted "Theo! Theo! Theo!" Three nights later, he scored a goal and an assist in a 5–2 victory over the Florida Panthers.

Fleury played four exhibition games, scoring four points, before being released by the Flames. General Manager Darryl Sutter expressed his pride in Fleury's attempt and commended his effort, but decided he was not one of the top six wingers in camp, which Sutter and Fleury had agreed was a condition of the tryout continuing. On 28 September 2009, Fleury announced his retirement at a news conference at the Saddledome. He thanked the Flames for allowing him to attempt the comeback, and expressed satisfaction at how his career ended. "I get to retire a Calgary Flame. I HAD to retire a Calgary Flame. It's been a long journey. It's time to put down some roots. And there's no better place than here," said Fleury of his decision not to seek an offer from another team.

=== International ===
Fleury made his debut with the Canadian senior team at the 1990 Ice Hockey World Championships, scoring 11 points in nine games for the fourth-place Canadians. He returned the following year despite a knee injury, helping Canada win the silver medal at the 1991 tournament. His 51-goal NHL season in 1990–91 also earned Fleury a spot at the 1991 Canada Cup, where he scored a goal and four assists in seven games for the tournament champion Canadians. Five years later, he played in the 1996 World Cup of Hockey, the successor to the Canada Cup. He finished fourth in the tournament with four goals, but Canada finished in second place after giving up four goals in the final four minutes of the championship game against the American team.

National Hockey League players were first allowed to participate in the Olympic ice hockey tournament at the 1998 games. Invited to join Canada's "Dream Team", Fleury described his selection as a highlight of his life. He scored a goal for Canada, who lost their semi-final match-up against the Czech Republic in a shootout and failed to medal. Four years later, Fleury was invited by General Manager Wayne Gretzky to participate in Canada's selection camp for the 2002 Olympics. The invitation was controversial, as his behavioural and substance abuse issues had become increasingly public in previous months. Fleury wanted to justify Gretzky's support and, knowing that he would be removed from consideration if he failed, refrained from drinking or taking drugs during the 2001–02 NHL season, later describing himself as a "dry drunk". He earned a spot on the team and recorded two assists in six games as the Canadian hockey team won its first Olympic gold medal in 50 years. Fleury considers the championship to be the pinnacle of his career.

== Post-playing career ==
=== Sexual abuse charges against Graham James ===
With the help of Kirstie McLellan Day, Fleury wrote his autobiography, Playing with Fire, which was released on 16 October 2009. He wrote he was sexually abused by hockey coach Graham James during a two-year period. While he stated he "doesn't want to become the poster boy for abuse by James", Fleury hoped speaking out might make it easier for other childhood sexual abuse victims to come forward, and get help. The book became the top-selling non-fiction book in Canada; without help, he and his wife were unable to keep up with the mail they were receiving. It is the second book about Fleury's life, following Fury, released in 1997, which did not discuss many of the problems he was facing at the time. Playing with Fire became the top seller on Amazon.ca within a week of its release, and Fleury stated that he had been contacted by several sexual abuse victims who were motivated by his book to seek help.

He told CBC in October 2009 he was contemplating a criminal complaint against James, and was volunteering with an organization dedicated to helping male sexual abuse victims. Sheldon Kennedy, another victim of James, encouraged Fleury to press charges. In January 2010, investigators with the Winnipeg Police Service began an investigation after Fleury met with officers to file a complaint. James plead guilty to charges stemming from his abuse of Fleury and his cousin Todd Holt. James was sentenced to two years in prison, a decision which sparked outrage across Canada for its perceived leniency. Fleury praised the response by Canadians and called for harsher punishments for sexual predators. Fleury has shared his story as a motivational speaker.

McLellan Day adapted the autobiography into a one-man play, entitled Playing with Fire: The Theo Fleury Story, which was produced by Alberta Theatre Projects in Calgary in 2012. Fleury and his autobiography were also the subject of a 2012 documentary by HBO Canada.

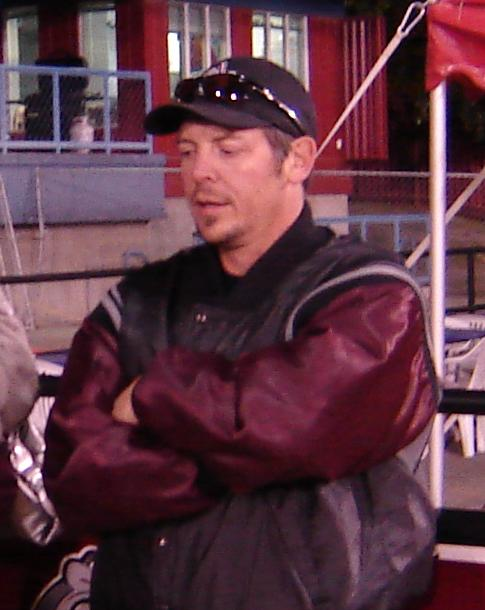
Fleury played in two games with baseball's Calgary Vipers in 2008.

=== Work with programs for abuse victims, addictions and other services ===
Fleury has been open about his struggles against drug and alcohol addictions, and his own experiences with sexual abuse. He is also an advocate for youth victims of sexual abuse and a supporter of improving access to trauma treatments, addictions programs and mental health services.

In his autobiography, he blamed the sexual abuse for turning him into a "raging, alcoholic lunatic", and claimed to have placed a loaded gun in his mouth and contemplated suicide in 2004. He revealed most of his income had been spent on alcohol, drugs, gambling and women.

Fleury said he failed 13 consecutive drug tests while playing for the Rangers, but the NHL did not want to suspend him because he was a top scorer. The league disputed this claim, and stated that its substance abuse program functioned appropriately.

Fleury has organized or participated in numerous charitable causes. He launched a hockey school in the mid-1990s that ran for seven years in Calgary and another eight in Russell, Manitoba and donated the proceeds to minor hockey associations.

Following his diagnosis with Crohn's disease in 1995, Fleury joined with the Crohn's and Colitis Foundation of Canada to host an annual golf tournament in Calgary. The event has raised over $1 million, and is one of the organization's largest fundraising events in the Calgary area. He participates in Flames Alumni events and volunteers with the Calgary Dream Centre, which helps people overcome addictions.

Fleury was a participant on the second season of the Canadian Broadcasting Corporation figure skating reality show Battle of the Blades, aired in the fall of 2010, and was donating his winnings to The Men's Project, a charity that provides support for men abused in childhood.

Fleury said in a November 2004 interview with the Canadian Broadcasting Corporation he was still battling the drug and alcohol addictions that had ended his NHL career a year and a half earlier. On 18 September 2005, he became sober and credited the achievement to help from his second wife, Jennifer. Fleury feared Jennifer's frustrations with his addictions would cost him the relationship. With her help, he was able to quit alcohol and drug abuse.

Fleury and Jennifer met when he was playing for Horse Lake in 2005. They married one year later and have a daughter, Skylah. Fleury also has a son and daughter, Beaux and Tatym, with his first wife, Veronica, and a son, Josh, born in 1987 to his high school girlfriend, Shannon.

=== Political opinions and conspiracy theories ===
Fleury and Jamie Salé host The Theo & Jamie Show: Fire and Ice, an online program with the Calgary-based conservative media outlet Canadians for Truth. Politically, Fleury is a conservative although he has previously voted for the Liberal Party in past federal elections.

Fleury is a skeptic of COVID-19 vaccines. When reports about the virus were first made in late 2019, Fleury said he believed the virus was "complete bullshit." He has criticized liberal and conservative politicians who supported mask and vaccine mandates, including Alberta Premier Jason Kenney and Prime Minister Justin Trudeau. He has also promoted ivermectin as a treatment for COVID-19 and criticised the mainstream media for a supposed "absolute all out disinformation campaign" over its use.

He told Fox News host Tucker Carlson that Canada is an "authoritarian" country and that Trudeau is controlled by "five entities." In a separate interview with Fox News host Laura Ingraham in January 2022, he repeated his belief that Trudeau was being controlled by unnamed foreign entities and hoped the Canada convoy protest would lead to a "revolution."

In 2021, Brandon University issued a statement criticizing Fleury for saying on Twitter that COVID-19 vaccine passports would be used by pedophiles to track children, calling the comment "a stain on his legacy." The university had previously granted Fleury an honorary degree in 2015. Fleury has also promoted the "Great Reset" conspiracy theory.

In 2018, Fleury was a guest speaker at a fundraising event for the Progressive Conservative Party of Prince Edward Island. He is a member of the United Conservative Party and endorsed Brian Jean for party leadership in 2017. He endorsed Danielle Smith during the 2022 UCP leadership race. In the 2022 Conservative Party of Canada leadership election, Fleury endorsed and joined the campaign of Joseph Bourgault.

During the 2023 wildfires across Canada, Fleury claimed that progressives were weaponizing the wildfires to force "climate lockdowns" onto the masses.

=== Business ventures ===
In 1994, Fleury joined a group that involved his former junior coach, Graham James, fellow NHL player Joe Sakic, and professional wrestler Bret Hart as a minority owner of the expansion Calgary Hitmen of the Western Hockey League. He sold his share of the team to the Flames in 1997 in the aftermath of James' conviction for sexually abusing Sheldon Kennedy and another player.

After returning from the United Kingdom, he operated Fleury's Concrete Coatings, a concrete sealing business he started with his wife Jennifer and brother Travis, until it closed in 2009. He filmed a pilot episode in 2007 for a reality TV series based on his concrete business called Theoren Fleury: Rock Solid: "We want to show people that if you have a dream, anything is possible with a little ambition," Fleury said of the show. It was not picked up by any network.

The 2008 launch of clothing line "FAKE" (Fleury's Artistic Kustom Enterprises) led him to approach the Calgary Vipers of the Golden Baseball League in the hope of convincing them to use his brand of practice jerseys. The conversation led to talk of Fleury playing a game for the Vipers as a publicity stunt.

He made his professional baseball debut on 9 August 2008, at the age of 40, hitting a single in a pinch-hit appearance against the Yuma Scorpions. He started the second game at left field and struck out twice before he was replaced. "I've had so many things happen in my life already that I sometimes surprise myself with the things I've done, the things I've accomplished. This was just another one of those days," Fleury said of his appearance with the Vipers.

=== Country music career ===
In September 2015, it was announced through Fleury's Twitter he was working on a country music record to be released in the fall of 2015. He released his first single titled "My Life's Been a Country Song" and it reached more than 20,000 plays on SoundCloud within the first 24 hours of being released. His debut record, I Am Who I Am, was released on 16 October 2015, through eOne Music Canada.

Fleury said his country music ambitions had been a six-year process and he received vocal and performance training from music industry professionals. He collaborated with long-time friends Phil Deschambault and Paddy McCallion and together wrote more than 30 songs worth of material that would be later cut to ten songs for the album.

In 2017, Fleury wrote a song, "Longshot", for the video game Madden NFL 18's story mode of the same name.

== Career statistics ==
=== Regular season and playoffs ===
			Regular season					Playoffs
Season	Team	League	GP	G	A	Pts	PIM	GP	G	A	Pts	PIM
1983–84	St. James Canadians	MJHL	22	31	33	64	88	—	—	—	—	—
1984–85	Moose Jaw Warriors	WHL	71	29	46	75	82	—	—	—	—	—
1985–86	Moose Jaw Warriors	WHL	72	43	65	108	124	13	7	13	20	16
1986–87	Moose Jaw Warriors	WHL	66	61	68	129	110	9	7	9	16	34
1987–88	Moose Jaw Warriors	WHL	65	68	92	160	235	—	—	—	—	—
1987–88	Salt Lake Golden Eagles	IHL	2	3	4	7	7	8	11	5	16	16
1988–89	Salt Lake Golden Eagles	IHL	40	37	37	74	81	—	—	—	—	—
1988–89	Calgary Flames	NHL	36	14	20	34	46	22	5	6	11	24
1989–90	Calgary Flames	NHL	80	31	35	66	157	6	2	3	5	10
1990–91	Calgary Flames	NHL	79	51	53	104	136	7	2	5	7	14
1991–92	Calgary Flames	NHL	80	33	40	73	133	—	—	—	—	—
1992–93	Calgary Flames	NHL	83	34	66	100	88	6	5	7	12	27
1993–94	Calgary Flames	NHL	83	40	45	85	186	7	6	4	10	5
1994–95	Tappara	SM-l	10	8	9	17	22	—	—	—	—	—
1994–95	Calgary Flames	NHL	47	29	29	58	112	7	7	7	14	2
1995–96	Calgary Flames	NHL	80	46	50	96	112	4	2	1	3	14
1996–97	Calgary Flames	NHL	81	29	38	67	104	—	—	—	—	—
1997–98	Calgary Flames	NHL	82	27	51	78	197	—	—	—	—	—
1998–99	Calgary Flames	NHL	60	30	39	69	68	—	—	—	—	—
1998–99	Colorado Avalanche	NHL	15	10	14	24	18	18	5	12	17	20
1999–00	New York Rangers	NHL	80	15	49	64	68	—	—	—	—	—
2000–01	New York Rangers	NHL	62	30	44	74	122	—	—	—	—	—
2001–02	New York Rangers	NHL	82	24	39	63	216	—	—	—	—	—
2002–03	Chicago Blackhawks	NHL	54	12	21	33	77	—	—	—	—	—
2004–05	Horse Lake Thunder	NPHL	7	4	10	14	28	—	—	—	—	—
2005–06	Belfast Giants	EIHL	34	22	52	74	270	7	1	12	13	34
2008–09	Steinbach North Stars	HM	13	8	19	27	42	4	2	5	7	26
NHL totals			1,084	455	633	1,088	1,840	77	34	45	79	116

=== International ===
Year	Team	Event	GP	G	A	Pts	PIM
1987	Canada	WJC	6	2	3	5	2
1988	Canada	WJC	7	6	2	8	4
1990	Canada	WC	9	4	7	11	10
1991	Canada	WC	8	5	5	10	8
1991	Canada	CC	7	1	4	5	12
1996	Canada	WCH	8	4	2	6	8
1998	Canada	OLY	6	1	3	4	2
2002	Canada	OLY	6	0	2	2	6
Junior totals			13	8	5	13	6
Senior totals			44	15	23	38	46

=== All-Star Games ===
Year	Location	G	A	P	PIM
1991	Chicago	1	0	1	0
1992	Philadelphia	1	0	1	0
1996	Boston	0	0	0	0
1997	San Jose	0	1	1	0
1998	Vancouver	1	2	3	2
1999	Tampa Bay	0	2	2	0
2001	Colorado	2	1	3	0
All-Star totals		5	6	11	2

== Awards ==
Award	Year
Junior
WHL East first All-Star team	1987
WHL East second All-Star team	1988
Bob Clarke Trophy	1988 (shared)
IIHF World Junior Championship Tournament All-Star	1988
NHL
Stanley Cup champion	1989
NHL Plus-Minus Award	1991 (shared)
NHL second team All-Star	1995
Calgary Flames
Molson Cup	1991, 1993, 1996, 1998
Elite Ice Hockey League
Player of the Year	2006
First team All-Star	2006

Aside from Fleury's hockey accomplishments, he has also been awarded the Canadian Humanitarian Award and the Queen's Jubilee Medallion. The Medallion is awarded to those individuals who have made a significant contribution to Canada. Along with these awards Fleury has also received the Aboriginal Inspire Award. Fleury has also received the honorary Siksika Nation Chief and an honorary doctorate in science from the University of Guelph-Humber for outstanding contributions to the mental health of Canadians.

Preceded by Joe Nieuwendyk	Calgary Flames captain 1995–97	Succeeded by Todd Simpson
