= Dody Wood =

Canadian ice hockey player

- Born: March 18, 1972 (age 53); Chetwynd, British Columbia, Canada
- Height: 5 ft 11 in (180 cm)
- Weight: 180 lb (82 kg; 12 st 12 lb)
- Position: Left wing
- Shot: Left
- Played for: San Jose Sharks; Kansas City Blades; Albany River Rats
- NHL draft: 45th overall, 1991; San Jose Sharks
- Playing career: 1992–2004

Darin Michael "Dody" Wood (born March 18, 1972) is a Canadian former professional ice hockey left winger drafted by the San Jose Sharks in the third round, 45th overall, in the 1991 NHL Entry Draft. He appeared in 106 NHL games with the San Jose Sharks before being traded to the New Jersey Devils on December 7, 1997. He was subsequently assigned to the Albany River Rats for the remainder of the 1997–98 season. In September 2000, he signed as a free agent with the Vancouver Canucks.

Wood also played with the IHL's Kansas City Blades, where he was voted most popular player twice and received community service awards. He wore number 16 during his first tenure with the team (1992–1995) and number 13 upon his return in 1998 (due to number 16 being taken), later switching back to 16. He also played a few games with the Memphis RiverKings of the CHL and the Dayton Bombers during the 2003–04 season.

After his NHL career, Wood continued playing in a senior league, the Horse Lake Thunder of the North Peace Hockey League, and eventually played for the Allan Cup. This league included many players Wood had played with during his NHL career, such as former Vancouver Canuck and Montreal Canadien Gino Odjick, former Calgary Flames fighter Sasha Lakovic and his brother Greg Lakovic, and Theo Fleury's cousin Todd Holt. Dody Wood was referred to as the "former San Jose tough guy" in this league. Several articles noted the irony of "Odjick, Lakovic and Wood banding together in a league with the word peace in its title".

== Personal ==
Wood learned to skate at age five after his parents enrolled him in the Little Giant Figure Skating Club. A year later, he was enrolled in Chetwynd's Minor Hockey Association.

Wood has three children: a son, Bayley (born 1997), from his previous marriage, and twin daughters, Zarah and Zinia (born 2007), from his second marriage.

Wood coached the CDMHA's Midget Giants during the 2012–13 season. Wood stated he was volunteering for the "very association that taught him the 'love of the game'".

Wood is from Chetwynd, British Columbia, and is of Saulteau First Nations ancestry.

== Career statistics ==
| | | | Regular season | | | | | Playoffs |
| Season | Team | League | GP | G | A | Pts | PIM | GP | G | A | Pts | PIM |
|---|---|---|---|---|---|---|---|---|---|---|---|---|
| 1989–90 | Fort St. John Huskies | PCJHL | 44 | 51 | 73 | 124 | 270 | — | — | — | — | — |
| 1989–90 | Seattle Thunderbirds | WHL | — | — | — | — | — | 5 | 0 | 0 | 0 | 2 |
| 1990–91 | Seattle Thunderbirds | WHL | 69 | 28 | 37 | 65 | 272 | 6 | 0 | 1 | 1 | 32 |
| 1991–92 | Seattle Thunderbirds | WHL | 37 | 13 | 19 | 32 | 232 | — | — | — | — | — |
| 1991–92 | Swift Current Broncos | WHL | 3 | 0 | 2 | 2 | 14 | 7 | 2 | 1 | 3 | 37 |
| 1992–93 | San Jose Sharks | NHL | 13 | 1 | 1 | 2 | 71 | — | — | — | — | — |
| 1992–93 | Kansas City Blades | IHL | 36 | 3 | 2 | 5 | 216 | 6 | 0 | 1 | 1 | 15 |
| 1993–94 | Kansas City Blades | IHL | 48 | 5 | 15 | 20 | 320 | — | — | — | — | — |
| 1994–95 | San Jose Sharks | NHL | 9 | 1 | 1 | 2 | 29 | — | — | — | — | — |
| 1994–95 | Kansas City Blades | IHL | 44 | 5 | 13 | 18 | 255 | 21 | 7 | 10 | 17 | 87 |
| 1995–96 | San Jose Sharks | NHL | 32 | 3 | 6 | 9 | 138 | — | — | — | — | — |
| 1996–97 | San Jose Sharks | NHL | 44 | 3 | 2 | 5 | 193 | — | — | — | — | — |
| 1996–97 | Kansas City Blades | IHL | 6 | 3 | 6 | 9 | 35 | — | — | — | — | — |
| 1997–98 | San Jose Sharks | NHL | 8 | 0 | 0 | 0 | 40 | — | — | — | — | — |
| 1997–98 | Albany River Rats | AHL | 34 | 4 | 13 | 17 | 185 | 13 | 2 | 0 | 2 | 55 |
| 1997–98 | Kansas City Blades | IHL | 2 | 0 | 1 | 1 | 31 | — | — | — | — | — |
| 1998–99 | Kansas City Blades | IHL | 60 | 11 | 16 | 27 | 286 | 3 | 0 | 1 | 1 | 25 |
| 1999–00 | Kansas City Blades | IHL | 77 | 13 | 28 | 41 | 341 | — | — | — | — | — |
| 2000–01 | Kansas City Blades | IHL | 45 | 9 | 14 | 23 | 211 | — | — | — | — | — |
| 2001–02 | Ayr Scottish Eagles | BISL | 42 | 16 | 15 | 31 | 171 | 7 | 3 | 4 | 7 | 11 |
| 2002–03 | Nottingham Panthers | BISL | 27 | 2 | 8 | 10 | 105 | 16 | 2 | 3 | 5 | 98 |
| 2003–04 | Dayton Bombers | ECHL | 13 | 1 | 1 | 2 | 87 | — | — | — | — | — |
| 2003–04 | Memphis RiverKings | CHL | 10 | 1 | 1 | 2 | 32 | — | — | — | — | — |
| 2003–04 | Garaga de Saint-Georges | QSMHL | 18 | 4 | 4 | 8 | 116 | — | — | — | — | — |
| IHL totals | | | 318 | 49 | 94 | 143 | 1695 | 30 | 7 | 12 | 19 | 127 |
| NHL totals | | | 106 | 8 | 10 | 18 | 471 | - | - | - | - | - |
