= Gino Odjick =

Canadian ice hockey player (1970–2023)

- Odjick during the 1997–98 season with the Vancouver Canucks
- Born: September 7, 1970 Maniwaki, Quebec, Canada
- Died: January 15, 2023 (aged 52) Vancouver, British Columbia, Canada
- Height: 6 ft 3 in (191 cm)
- Weight: 215 lb (98 kg; 15 st 5 lb)
- Position: Left wing
- Shot: Left
- Played for: Vancouver Canucks; New York Islanders; Philadelphia Flyers; Montreal Canadiens
- NHL draft: 86th overall, 1990; Vancouver Canucks
- Playing career: 1990–2002

Wayne Gino Odjick (September 7, 1970 – January 15, 2023) was a Canadian professional ice hockey left winger who played 12 seasons in the National Hockey League (NHL) from 1990 to 2002 for the Vancouver Canucks, New York Islanders, Philadelphia Flyers and Montreal Canadiens.

Of Algonquin heritage, he was born and raised on a reserve in Quebec, and played major junior hockey with the Laval Titan of the Quebec Major Junior Hockey League before being selected by the Canucks in the 1990 NHL entry draft. Known as an enforcer during his playing career, he was nicknamed the "Algonquin Assassin" and "Maniwaki Mauler". Outside of hockey Odjick was active in Indigenous causes, working closely with groups in both the provinces of British Columbia (where the Canucks played) and Quebec. After his retirement from hockey Odjick developed mental and physical health issues, spending time in psychiatric care, and in 2014 was diagnosed with AL amyloidosis; the disease would contribute to his death in 2023.

== Early life ==
Odjick was born in the Algonquin reserve of Kitigan Zibi just outside the town of Maniwaki, Quebec. His father, Joe, was born in 1939 at Rapid Lake to Basil, a trapper and fishing guide, who was later killed in France in 1944 during the Second World War, and Marie-Antoinette Marchand, who was part-French. At the age of nine, Joe was sent to a residential school in Spanish, Ontario. The registration number he was given at the school, 29, was later used by Odjick during his playing career. Odjick was the fourth child and only son of six children for Joe and Giselle, after Debbie, Shelley, Judy and ahead of Janique and Dina; the Odjicks also raised at least 32 foster children. Originally named Wayne, Odjick was soon given a new name, Gino, as the family found out there was another Wayne on the reserve. Odjick spoke three languages: English, French, and Algonquin.

Odjick played hockey from an early age, first skating at the age of 5, taught by his father. However there were no hockey teams for children that age in Kitigan Zibi, so Odjick was first enrolled in a figure skating program as a means to let him skate regularly. When he was 11 Odjick joined an organized team, managed by Joe. He played in the 1983 Quebec International Pee-Wee Hockey Tournament with a minor ice hockey team from Maniwaki. Until he was 15, Odjick stayed with local teams that mainly played other teams from reserves, often coached by his father. At that age, he considered quitting hockey to pursue other activities, and had enrolled in a welding program in Ottawa, but his mother had a family friend arranged a try-out with the Hawkesbury Hawks, a Tier II junior team in Ontario. Though he had been a defensive defenceman until that point, Odjick soon realized that his skills were not good enough, and instead became an enforcer. It was while in Hawkesbury that Odjick was first given the nickname "the Algonquin Assassin," a reference to his heritage and skills as a fighter.

Odjick credited his sense of defending his team and fighting skills in part due to racial tensions between natives of the reserve and nearby townspeople. He later worked to help Indigenous youth.

== Playing career ==
Odjick's coach in Hawkesbury, Bob Hartley, recommended him to the Laval Titan of the Quebec Major Junior Hockey League (QMJHL), who signed him in 1988. He would play two seasons for the Titan, playing for the Memorial Cup both seasons. Odjick was drafted by the Vancouver Canucks in the fifth round (86th overall) in the 1990 NHL entry draft. After his first training camp with the Canucks in 1990 he was sent to their minor league affiliate, the Milwaukee Admirals of the International Hockey League, rather than return to the QMJHL. He played 17 games for the Admirals before joining the Canucks full-time in 1990. His NHL debut came on November 21, 1990 against the Chicago Blackhawks. Wearing #66 (which he was assigned in training camp; he would adopt #29 after that), he had two fights in the game, against Dave Manson and Stu Grimson. Odjick quickly became a fan-favourite, with chants of "Gino, Gino" in appreciation of him.

For most of his career as a Canuck, he played on the same line as the high-scoring Pavel Bure; his primary duty was to protect Bure. For the 1993–94 NHL season, Odjick had a career high of 16 goals and 13 assists for 29 points. He played in a total of 8 seasons for the Canucks from 1990–91 to 1997–98. During six of those seasons, he had over 200 penalty minutes, and twice he had over 300. His sixth season (1997–98) with over 200 penalty minutes was split between the Canucks (181 penalty minutes in 35 games) and New York Islanders (31 in 13 games).

In the 1997–98 season, Odjick was traded to the New York Islanders and played there until 1999 when he was traded to the Philadelphia Flyers. He left Philadelphia during the 2000–01 season for the Montreal Canadiens. His last NHL season was with Montreal in 2001–02. He missed most of the 2002–03 season due to concussion from a puck hitting him in the back of the head during pre-season practice, and was subsequently suspended in February 2003 by the Canadiens for failure to report to the minor-league AHL team. While there was still a year left on his contract, Odjick and the Canadiens agreed to mutually terminate it at that time. He retired from professional hockey thereafter, his last organized hockey stint coming in 2005, when he played on the Horse Lake Thunder team. The Thunder featured several hired ringers, including ex-NHLers Theo Fleury, Sasha Lakovic and Dody Wood, and made it to the semi-finals of the 2005 Allan Cup.

== Post-playing career ==
In 2003, Odjick moved back to Vancouver and collaborated with the Musqueam First Nation to manage the Musqueam Golf & Learning Academy. He long had an association with the Musqueam, living on their reserve near Vancouver during his time with the Canucks. He also worked with the Aquilini family, who purchased the Canucks in 2004, advising them on working with Indigenous groups for business opportunities.

Odjick starred in the 2014 Canadian short film Ronny Nomad and the Legendary Napkins of Wood written and produced by Adrian Patterson. The film won best comedic short at the Oregon Independent Film Festival.

Odjick dealt with several physical and mental health issues in his post-hockey life. In 2009 he was diagnosed as bi-polar. He would spend time in psychiatric hospitals in 2010, 2012, and 2013 as a result of this and other mental health issues. On June 26, 2014, Odjick revealed that he was diagnosed with the rare terminal disease AL amyloidosis, a rare blood disorder and whose exact cause is often unknown. This condition had slowly been hardening his heart by coating it in abnormal protein deposits, which eventually led Odjick to suffer a heart attack. He received the Indspire Award in the sports category in 2015. Given just months to live, Odjick turned to an experimental treatment for his illness. Odjick began recovering, and three years later, his heart was working at 60 percent of its capacity.

Odjick died from a heart attack on January 15, 2023, at age 52. Odjick's parents, Joe and Giselle, predeceased him. He had eight children and five sisters. One of his sons was named Bure in honour of Odjick's Canucks teammate and close friend, Pavel Bure. In June 2023, doctors informed Odjick's family that he highly likely suffered from the effects of chronic traumatic encephalopathy, with Odjick experiencing forgetfulness and would repeat himself.

== Career statistics ==
Bold indicates led league

=== Regular season and playoffs ===
			Regular season					Playoffs
Season	Team	League	GP	G	A	Pts	PIM	GP	G	A	Pts	PIM
1987–88	Hawkesbury Hawks	CJHL	40	2	4	6	167	—	—	—	—	—
1988–89	Laval Titan	QMJHL	50	9	15	24	278	16	0	9	9	129
1989–90	Laval Titan	QMJHL	51	12	26	38	280	13	6	5	11	110
1990–91	Milwaukee Admirals	IHL	17	7	3	10	102	—	—	—	—	—
1990–91	Vancouver Canucks	NHL	45	7	1	8	296	6	0	0	0	18
1991–92	Vancouver Canucks	NHL	65	4	6	10	348	4	0	0	0	6
1992–93	Vancouver Canucks	NHL	75	4	13	17	370	1	0	0	0	0
1993–94	Vancouver Canucks	NHL	76	16	13	29	271	10	0	0	0	18
1994–95	Vancouver Canucks	NHL	23	4	5	9	109	5	0	0	0	47
1995–96	Vancouver Canucks	NHL	55	4	3	7	181	6	3	1	4	6
1996–97	Vancouver Canucks	NHL	70	5	8	13	**371**	—	—	—	—	—
1997–98	Vancouver Canucks	NHL	35	3	2	5	181	—	—	—	—	—
1997–98	New York Islanders	NHL	13	0	0	0	31	—	—	—	—	—
1998–99	New York Islanders	NHL	23	4	3	7	133	—	—	—	—	—
1999–2000	New York Islanders	NHL	46	5	10	15	90	—	—	—	—	—
1999–00	Philadelphia Flyers	NHL	13	3	1	4	10	—	—	—	—	—
2000–01	Philadelphia Flyers	NHL	17	1	3	4	28	—	—	—	—	—
2000–01	Montreal Canadiens	NHL	13	1	0	1	44	—	—	—	—	—
2001–02	Quebec Citadelles	AHL	13	2	1	3	40	—	—	—	—	—
2001–02	Montreal Canadiens	NHL	36	4	4	8	104	12	1	0	1	47
2004–05	Horse Lake Thunder	AC	—	—	—	—	—	3	3	4	7	—
NHL totals			605	64	73	137	2,567	44	4	1	5	142

== See also ==
- Fighting in ice hockey
- List of NHL players with 2,000 career penalty minutes
