= Playing with Fire (Fleury book) =

2009 book by Theoren Fleury and Kirstie McLellan Day

- First edition
- Author: Theoren Fleury, Kirstie McLellan Day
- Language: English
- Subject: Autobiography
- Publisher: HarperCollins
- Publication date: October 16, 2009
- Publication place: Canada
- Media type: Print (Hardcover and Paperback and audio-CD
- Pages: 322 (hardcover edition)
- ISBN: 978-1-55468-239-3 (hardcover edition)

Playing with Fire is the best selling autobiography of former National Hockey League (NHL) player Theoren Fleury. Co-written with author Kirstie McLellan Day, Fleury documented how he became a star player, Stanley Cup champion and Olympic gold medalist despite battling drug and alcohol addictions that ultimately ended his NHL career and led him to contemplate suicide. In the book, he made allegations that he was sexually abused by his junior coach, Graham James, and subsequently filed a complaint with Winnipeg Police Service. Graham James was prosecuted and was sentenced to jail time. Playing with Fire was a 2010 Libris Award nominee for top non-fiction book of 2010 by the Canadian Booksellers Association.

In the weeks prior to the book's October 16, 2009 release, Fleury attempted to return to the NHL with the team he first played for, the Calgary Flames, six years after his last NHL game. Some observers praised him as a role model for his attempt, while others criticized it as being a publicity stunt to help generate interest in the book. He appeared in several exhibition games with the Flames, but was released and subsequently chose to retire from hockey. Riding a wave of popularity from his comeback attempt, Playing with Fire became the top-selling non-fiction book on Amazon.ca within two weeks of its release. Supported by an extensive promotional tour across Canada, Playing with Fire sold over 80,000 copies within six weeks of its release.
