= Graham James (ice hockey) =

Canadian ice hockey coach

- Born: February 7, 1952 (age 74); Summerside, Prince Edward Island, Canada
- Occupation: Ice hockey coach
- Status: Convicted and sentenced
- Conviction: Sexual abuse
- Penalty: 5 years in prison

Graham Michael James (born February 7, 1952) is a Canadian former junior ice hockey coach who was convicted of sexually abusing players on his teams.

After coaching the Swift Current Broncos to the 1989 Memorial Cup championship, he was named Man of the Year by The Hockey News, an honour which was later revoked. In 1994, James became the general manager and coach of the Calgary Hitmen.

James attracted national attention two years later when NHL player Sheldon Kennedy came forward to accuse him of sexually abusing him over a period of years as his junior league coach. Kennedy also said that another NHL player had endured the same abuse, but refused to name him. James pleaded guilty and was sentenced to three and a half years in prison. After completing his sentence, he obtained a federal pardon and left the country, settling in Spain and Mexico. However, in 2009, Theoren Fleury published a book alleging he too had been abused by James in the 1980s, which James again acknowledged as true. In March 2012, he was sentenced to another two years in prison.

On May 25, 2015, it was reported that James was facing additional sexual assault charges in Swift Current, Saskatchewan. The case was adjourned by Judge Violet Meekma until June 19, when the case was to be heard in the Court of Queen's Bench. James was granted full parole in September 2016.

== Early life ==
Born in Summerside, Prince Edward Island, on February 7, 1952, he played hockey until about the age of 18, when he stopped due to asthma attacks. He then allegedly graduated from university, and worked as a substitute teacher in St. James-Assiniboia School Division 2, Winnipeg, Manitoba. It wasn't until after he began his hockey coaching career that it became known that he hadn't graduated from university until after he completed the necessary courses for his B.A. while serving one of his prison sentences.

Between 1979 and 1983, he coached Junior A Hockey, winning the Manitoba provincial title with the Fort Garry Blues. In 1984, he was head scout for the Winnipeg Warriors of the Western Hockey League, and recruited two future National Hockey League players to the team, Theoren Fleury and Sheldon Kennedy. The team later relocated to Moose Jaw as the Moose Jaw Warriors, and in 1985 James was hired as head coach for the team.

He was the coach and general manager of the Swift Current Broncos from 1986 to 1994, leading them to WHL titles in 1989 and 1993. The team also won the Memorial Cup in 1989, and in the same year James was named Man of the Year by The Hockey News. The award was subsequently revoked by the magazine. He was coach of the Broncos when four of their players were killed after the team bus overturned on December 30, 1986. In 1994, James became the part owner, head coach and general manager of the expansion Calgary Hitmen, a new WHL franchise. He resigned during the 1996–97 season and was replaced by Dean Clark.

== Sexual abuse ==
In 1996, Sheldon Kennedy and another unnamed player came forward with complaints about sexual abuse they had suffered between 1984 and 1995, and on November 22, 1996, Calgary Police Service charged James with sexual assault. On January 2, 1997, James pleaded guilty to two counts of sexual assault involving more than 350 encounters with two underage players over a span of 10 years, and was sentenced to three and a half years in jail. He was paroled in 2001. The players referred to whomever James targeted as "Graham's new favourite". James was charismatic and consistently successful as a coach. Even during his investigation, he was able to secure character references from respected hockey people and former players. He claimed that his relationship with Sheldon Kennedy was consensual and it was not illegal or immoral. James noted that he was attracted to males, primarily between the ages of 15 and 25, but kept these feelings closeted.

In 1999, a civil lawsuit against James, the Canadian Hockey Association, the Western Hockey League and other hockey organizations was filed by an unnamed victim of James and his parents. It was settled out of court in 2003.

James was given a lifetime ban from coaching by the Canadian Hockey Association. When the CHA learned that James was coaching in Spain, it complained to European ice hockey officials, and he was fired. His subsequent whereabouts were unclear, though there were some rumours that he was living in Montreal. In May 2010, he was located by a Canadian Broadcasting Corporation investigative reporter, living in Guadalajara, Mexico.

In a memoir entitled Playing with Fire: The Theo Fleury Story, retired NHL player Theo Fleury alleged that from the age of 14 James had molested him for years during his time on the Moose Jaw Warrior team. On January 6, 2010, Fleury filed a criminal complaint with the City of Winnipeg police. "I have been reflecting on this a long time", said Fleury. "I wanted to make the biggest impact on preventing this kind of thing from happening in the future." James pleaded guilty to sexually assaulting Fleury's cousin Todd Holt and Fleury, saying he had assaulted both of his former players hundreds of times over the course of many years while they were teenagers. A third victim, Greg Gilhooly, also filed a complaint with the police. James refused to plead guilty to the charges relating to Gilhooly's assault and, consequently, the Gilhooly charges were stayed. James was sentenced to two years' imprisonment for these crimes.

=== New charges ===
On December 7, 2011, James pleaded guilty to sexual assaults involving two of his former players, former NHL star Theoren Fleury and Todd Holt, a cousin of Fleury's.

On March 20, 2012, he was sentenced to two years in prison, submitting DNA sample to national sex offender registry, and a lifetime ban on "volunteering in a position of trust to children". The new charges arose from Theoren Fleury's autobiography in which he describes the abuse.

=== Pardon ===
On April 4, 2010, it was revealed in the media that James had been issued a pardon by the Canadian National Parole Board in 2007. News of the pardon came to light only when an unidentified Winnipeg man brought an allegation of abuse against him. The situation surrounding the pardon provoked outrage, and has led to proposed changes to the Canadian pardon system.

On October 25, 2010, James was taken into custody at Pearson International Airport in Toronto. He was wanted in Winnipeg on nine counts of sexual assault, and was released on bail in December of that same year.

=== Crown appeal ===
On February 15, 2013, the Manitoba Court of Appeal revised James' sentence from two years to five years, after the Crown successfully argued Judge Catherine Carlson erred in sentencing principles on March 20, 2012, by putting too much weight into James' previous sentence of 3 1/2 years served in 1997.

== See also ==
- Jean Bégin, Canadian junior ice hockey coach convicted of sexual assault
