= Sheldon Kennedy =

Canadian ice hockey player (born 1969)

Sheldon Kennedy CM AOE OM
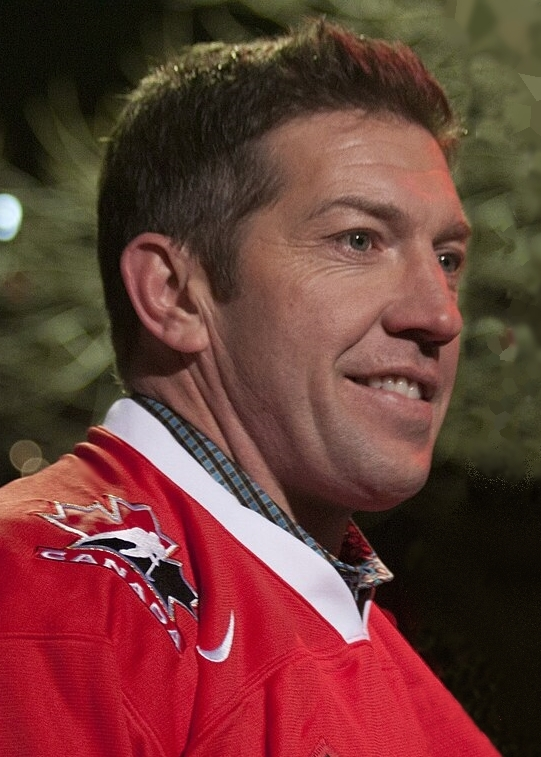
- Born: June 15, 1969 (age 57); Brandon, Manitoba, Canada
Ice hockey career
- Height: 5 ft 10 in (178 cm)
- Weight: 170 lb (77 kg; 12 st 2 lb)
- Position: Right wing
- Shot: Right
- Played for: Boston Bruins; Calgary Flames; Detroit Red Wings; Landshut EV
- NHL draft: 80th overall, 1988; Detroit Red Wings
- Playing career: 1989–1999

Sheldon Kennedy CM AOE OM (born June 15, 1969) is a Canadian former professional ice hockey player. He played for the Detroit Red Wings, Boston Bruins and Calgary Flames in the National Hockey League (NHL). Kennedy was drafted by the Red Wings in the fourth round of the 1988 NHL entry draft while playing with the Swift Current Broncos of the Western Hockey League (WHL). In the WHL, Kennedy helped the Broncos capture the 1989 Memorial Cup, and was named to the tournament all-star team. Kennedy represented Canada internationally at the World Junior Championships in 1988 and 1989. He helped Canada win a gold medal at the 1988 tournament. Kennedy was born in Brandon, Manitoba, but grew up in Elkhorn, Manitoba.

Kennedy is known for going public as a victim of sexual abuse by his coach, Graham James. In 1998, Kennedy roller bladed across Canada to raise awareness and funds for sexual abuse victims. Currently, Kennedy is a spokesperson for violence and abuse prevention programs with the Canadian Red Cross. He was honoured by Hockey Canada in 2020, with the Order of Hockey in Canada.

== Playing career ==
=== Junior ===
Kennedy started playing junior hockey with the Winnipeg South Blues of the Manitoba Junior Hockey League (MJHL) in 1985. After being noticed by Graham James at a hockey camp, Kennedy joined the Swift Current Broncos of the Western Hockey League (WHL) for the 1986–87 season. He spent the rest of his WHL career with the Broncos, helping the team capture the 1989 Memorial Cup. For his play during the tournament, Kennedy was named to the Memorial Cup All-Star Team. He was also named to the WHL's Eastern Conference Second All-Star Team. Kennedy along with fellow future NHLer Joe Sakic, was a passenger in the Swift Current Broncos bus crash that occurred in December 1986, killing four members of the team.

=== Professional ===
Kennedy was selected by the Detroit Red Wings in the fourth round (80th overall) of the 1988 National Hockey League (NHL) Entry Draft. His first professional season was split between the Red Wings in the NHL and their minor league affiliate Adirondack Red Wings of the American Hockey League (AHL). At the NHL level, Kennedy scored two goals and added seven assists in 20 games. Kennedy spent the next four seasons bouncing between the AHL and NHL within the Red Wings organization. The Winnipeg Jets acquired Kennedy from the Red Wings after the 1993–94 season. The NHL lock-out meant that Kennedy did not play for the Jets before being picked up waiver draft by the Calgary Flames. Kennedy spent two seasons in Calgary, then the Flames decided not to renew his contract in 1996. He signed as a free agent with the Boston Bruins for the 1996–97 season but also spent time with the Providence Bruins, Boston's AHL affiliate.

On January 6 1997, Kennedy identified himself as one of two former players who had been sexually abused by Graham James after having initiated the criminal proceedings in September 1996. He was given leave by the Bruins in order to attend the trial in Calgary.

The 1996–97 season was Kennedy's last campaign in the NHL but he later resurfaced in the 1998–99 season with the Manitoba Moose of the now-defunct International Hockey League. Kennedy also played for EV Landshut of the Deutsche Eishockey Liga in Germany during the 1998–99 season.

== Child advocacy ==
Kennedy has devoted his post hockey career to child abuse prevention and education. Along with his business partner, Wayne McNeil, he owns and operates Respect Group Inc. which provides training to thousands of people with messages and tools of empowerment to help people involved in amateur sport and education systems prevent bullying, harassment, and abuse.

On June 15, 2012, Kennedy was awarded an Honorary Doctorate from the University of Fraser Valley for his work supporting victims of child abuse and promoting education and awareness of the topic. On June 8, 2015, Kennedy was awarded with an Honorary degree, Doctor of Laws, from the University of Calgary for his extraordinary commitment to violence and abuse prevention programs in Canada.

On April 13, 2013, the Calgary Child Advocacy Centre was renamed the Sheldon Kennedy Child Advocacy Centre at a ceremony hosted by Prime Minister Stephen Harper. The centre provides services to children and their families using a coordinated, multi-disciplinary approach. The Centre houses 95 professionals from Calgary Police Services, Alberta Health Services, Child and Family Services, Royal Canadian Mounted Police, Alberta Education and crown prosecutors who work together to assess, treat, and seek justice for physically and sexually abused children. Sheldon Kennedy is a board member.

Kennedy was named as a Member of the Order of Canada on December 26, 2014, for “his courageous leadership in raising awareness of childhood sexual abuse and his continued efforts to prevent abuse in schools, sports and communities.”

Kennedy received the Lincoln Alexander Outstanding Leader Award at the University of Guelph, March 25, 2015.

In 2016 Kennedy was appointed to the Alberta Order of Excellence.

Kennedy was inducted into the Manitoba Sports Hall of Fame as an athlete/builder in 2020.

Kennedy was awarded the Order of Sport in 2020/21, marking his induction into Canada's Sports Hall of Fame as a builder.

=== Personal life ===
A television movie about his life, The Sheldon Kennedy Story, aired on CTV in 1999. Jonathan Scarfe starred as Kennedy. In 2006, he released his autobiography, Why I Didn't Say Anything - The Sheldon Kennedy Story. In the book he revealed that nightmares of James still continue to plague him. He also wrote frankly about his battles with cocaine addiction. The feature-length documentary Swift Current, released in 2016, details Kennedy's life from abuse to advocacy.

== Awards and achievements ==
Award	Year
WHL East Second All-Star Team	1989
Memorial Cup Tournament All-Star Team	1989
Order of Hockey in Canada	2020
Order of Sport	2020/21

== Career statistics ==
=== Regular season and playoffs ===
			Regular season					Playoffs
Season	Team	League	GP	G	A	Pts	PIM	GP	G	A	Pts	PIM
1984–85	Moose Jaw Warriors	WHL	16	0	0	0	2	—	—	—	—	—
1985–86	Winnipeg South Blues	MJHL	43	37	38	75	103	—	—	—	—	—
1986–87	Swift Current Broncos	WHL	49	23	41	64	43	4	0	3	3	4
1987–88	Swift Current Broncos	WHL	59	53	64	117	45	10	8	9	17	12
1988–89	Swift Current Broncos	WHL	51	58	48	106	92	12	9	15	24	22
1989–90	Adirondack Red Wings	AHL	26	11	15	26	35	—	—	—	—	—
1989–90	Detroit Red Wings	NHL	20	2	7	9	10	—	—	—	—	—
1990–91	Adirondack Red Wings	AHL	11	1	3	4	8	—	—	—	—	—
1990–91	Detroit Red Wings	NHL	7	1	0	1	12	—	—	—	—	—
1991–92	Adirondack Red Wings	AHL	46	25	24	49	56	15	5	9	14	12
1991–92	Detroit Red Wings	NHL	27	3	8	11	24	—	—	—	—	—
1992–93	Detroit Red Wings	NHL	68	19	11	30	46	7	1	1	2	2
1993–94	Detroit Red Wings	NHL	61	6	7	13	30	7	1	2	3	0
1994–95	Calgary Flames	NHL	30	7	8	15	45	7	3	1	4	16
1995–96	Calgary Flames	NHL	41	3	7	10	36	3	1	0	1	2
1995–96	Saint John Flames	AHL	3	4	0	4	8	—	—	—	—	—
1996–97	Providence Bruins	AHL	3	0	1	1	2	—	—	—	—	—
1996–97	Boston Bruins	NHL	56	8	10	18	30	—	—	—	—	—
1998–99	Manitoba Moose	IHL	24	7	7	14	14	—	—	—	—	—
1998–99	EV Landshut	DEL	13	0	3	3	0	3	0	0	0	4
AHL totals			89	41	43	84	109	15	5	9	14	12
NHL totals			310	49	58	107	233	24	6	4	10	20

=== International ===
Year	Team	Event	GP	G	A	Pts	PIM
1988	Canada	WJC	7	4	2	6	6
1989	Canada	WJC	7	3	4	7	14
Junior totals			14	7	6	13	20
