= Sasha Lakovic =

Canadian ice hockey player

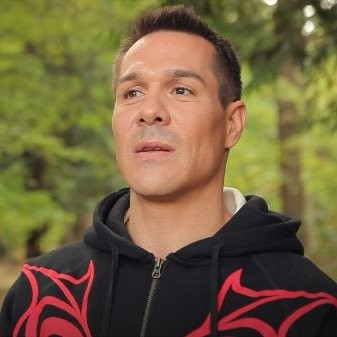
- Born: September 7, 1971 Vancouver, British Columbia, Canada
- Died: April 25, 2017 (aged 45) Vancouver, British Columbia, Canada
- Height: 6 ft 0 in (183 cm)
- Weight: 220 lb (100 kg; 15 st 10 lb)
- Position: Right wing
- Shot: Left
- Played for: Calgary Flames; New Jersey Devils
- NHL draft: Undrafted
- Playing career: 1992–2004

Sasha Gordon Lakovic (September 7, 1971 – April 25, 2017) was a Canadian professional ice hockey player who played for 17 different professional teams during his career. Lakovic also played for four roller hockey teams in the mid-1990s.

Lakovic also had a stint in acting, landing a small role as Russian ice hockey player Boris Mikhailov in the 2004 Disney biopic Miracle.

His nicknames were Hitman, Pitbull and Sasha the Basha.

== Playing career ==
Lakovic turned pro in 1992–93, playing for three separate Colonial Hockey League teams, as well as the American Hockey League's Binghamton Rangers. Lakovic bounced around the ECHL, Central Hockey League, International Hockey League and AHL for a few more seasons, including an incident where he got on all fours and barked to the crowd after defeating Barry Potomski in a fight while with the IHL's Las Vegas Thunder. Lakovic moved on to the National Hockey League's Calgary Flames in 1996–97. and was dealt to the New Jersey Devils a year later. Lakovic would play only 37 NHL games before finishing his career with stops in the West Coast Hockey League, and finally the Ligue Nord-Américaine de Hockey before retiring following the 2004–05 season.

Lakovic became known as an enforcer, registering 397 penalty minutes in his first pro season. He peaked at 416 penalty minutes in just 49 games in 1996–97 as a member of the Las Vegas Thunder.

During the hockey off-season, Lakovic played roller hockey for three Roller Hockey International teams from 1993 to 1997, and in the Major League Roller Hockey in 1998.

=== Battle of Alberta ===
Lakovic gained widespread attention on November 23, 1996, when playing in his first, and only, Battle of Alberta game between the Flames and the Edmonton Oilers. Late in the game, played at Northlands Coliseum in Edmonton, a drunken fan reached over the glass, dumping his drink on the head of Flames assistant coach Guy Lapointe. Lakovic immediately jumped over the glass attempting to get at the fan. Held back from climbing over by his teammates, Lakovic was suspended two games for the incident.

== Post-NHL ==
Lakovic later played in the American Hockey League, West Coast Hockey League, Quebec Semi-Pro Hockey League (now as Ligue Nord-Américaine de Hockey) and left hockey after 2005. He lived his later years in West Kelowna, British Columbia.

=== Acting ===
He portrayed Boris Mikhailov, captain of the Soviet hockey team at the 1980 Winter Olympics, in the movie Miracle based on the Miracle on Ice.

== Death ==
On October 12, 2016, Lakovic publicly announced that he was diagnosed with inoperable brain cancer and was given only three months to live.

Lakovic died on April 25, 2017, at the age of 45.

== Personal life ==
Lakovic was born into a Montenegrin Serb family to parents Spasoje and Marsha, who emigrated from Podgorica. He had four children and three brothers named Veso, Zoran, and Milosh.

Lakovic's nephew, Lynden Lakovic, is an ice hockey player who was drafted 27th overall by the Washington Capitals in the 2025 NHL entry draft.

== Career statistics ==
=== Regular season and playoffs ===
			Regular season					Playoffs
Season	Team	League	GP	G	A	Pts	PIM	GP	G	A	Pts	PIM
1989–90	Grandview Steelers	PIJHL	—	—	—	—	—	—	—	—	—	—
1990–91	Port Coquitlam Buckaroos	PIJHL	—	—	—	—	—	—	—	—	—	—
1991–92	Kelowna Spartans	BCJHL	4	1	0	1	14	—	—	—	—	—
1991–92	Bellingham Ice Hawks	BCJHL	24	8	3	11	67	—	—	—	—	—
1992–93	Chatham Wheels	CoHL	28	7	5	12	235	—	—	—	—	—
1992–93	Columbus Chill	ECHL	27	7	9	16	162	—	—	—	—	—
1992–93	Binghamton Rangers	AHL	3	0	0	0	0	—	—	—	—	—
1992–93	Brantford Smoke	CoHL	—	—	—	—	—	5	2	1	3	62
1993–94	Chatham Wheels	CoHL	13	11	7	18	61	—	—	—	—	—
1993–94	Toledo Storm	ECHL	24	5	10	15	198	—	—	—	—	—
1994–95	Tulsa Oilers	CHL	40	20	24	44	214	4	1	3	4	88
1995–96	Las Vegas Thunder	IHL	49	1	2	3	416	13	1	1	2	57
1996–97	Las Vegas Thunder	IHL	10	0	0	0	81	2	0	0	0	14
1996–97	Saint John Flames	AHL	18	1	8	9	182	—	—	—	—	—
1996–97	Calgary Flames	NHL	19	0	1	1	54	—	—	—	—	—
1997–98	Albany River Rats	AHL	30	7	6	13	158	13	3	4	7	84
1997–98	New Jersey Devils	NHL	2	0	0	0	5	—	—	—	—	—
1998–99	New Jersey Devils	NHL	16	0	3	3	59	—	—	—	—	—
1998–99	Albany River Rats	AHL	10	1	1	2	93	—	—	—	—	—
1999–00	Albany River Rats	AHL	51	10	16	26	144	5	0	0	0	14
2000–01	Rochester Americans	AHL	51	3	9	12	161	4	1	1	2	32
2000–01	Long Beach Ice Dogs	WCHL	8	3	6	9	29	—	—	—	—	—
2001–02	Bakersfield Condors	WCHL	30	5	13	18	147	—	—	—	—	—
2001–02	Anchorage Aces	WCHL	—	—	—	—	—	2	0	1	1	6
2002–03	St. Jean Mission	QPSHL	15	0	4	4	51	—	—	—	—	—
2004–05	Sherbrooke Saint-François	LNAH	2	0	0	0	16	—	—	—	—	—
2004–05	Horse Lake Thunder	NPHL	5	3	10	13	42	5	3	3	6	12
2010–11	Horse Lake Chiefs	NPHL	7	3	3	6	61	9	2	7	9	76
AHL totals			163	22	40	62	714	22	4	5	9	130
NHL totals			37	0	4	4	118	—	—	—	—	—

== See also ==
- List of violent spectator incidents in sports

== Notes ==
1. In Serbian: Saša Gordon Laković or Саша Гордон Лаковић in Cyrillic.
2. Sometimes as Sasha the Masha.
