= 2014–15 New York Islanders season =

NHL hockey team season

2014–15 New York Islanders
- Division: 3rd Metropolitan
- Conference: 5th Eastern
- 2014–15 record: 47–28–7
- Home record: 25–14–2
- Road record: 22–14–5
- Goals for: 252
- Goals against: 230

Team information
- General manager: Garth Snow
- Coach: Jack Capuano
- Captain: John Tavares
- Alternate captains: Cal Clutterbuck (Jan.–Apr.); Frans Nielsen; Kyle Okposo
- Arena: Nassau Veterans Memorial Coliseum
- Average attendance: 15,334 (41 games)
- Minor league affiliates: Bridgeport Sound Tigers (AHL); Adirondack Thunder (ECHL)

Team leaders
- Goals: John Tavares (38)
- Assists: John Tavares (48)
- Points: John Tavares (86)
- Penalty minutes: Matt Martin (114)
- Plus/minus: Ryan Strome (+23)
- Wins: Jaroslav Halak (38)
- Goals against average: Jaroslav Halak (2.43)

The 2014–15 New York Islanders season was the 43rd season in the franchise's history. This was the team's final full season of play at Nassau Veterans Memorial Coliseum. The Islanders competed in the Metropolitan Division of the Eastern Conference (NHL) for the second season.

Jaroslav Halak entered the season as the team's new starting goaltender, leading their previous starting goaltender, veteran Evgeni Nabokov, to sign with the Tampa Bay Lightning as a free agent. Chad Johnson was brought in to be Halak's backup, however he was later traded for Michal Neuvirth who took over the role. John Tavares served as the team's captain for the second season, alongside Kyle Okposo and Frans Nielsen in their sixth and first seasons, respectively, as alternate captains. Around the midpoint of the season, Cal Clutterbuck was named an alternate captain after an injury sidelined Okposo.

The Islanders qualified for the 2015 Stanley Cup playoffs after finishing the season in third place in the Metropolitan Division and fifth in the Eastern Conference with 101 points. The playoff berth was the team's second post-season berth in three seasons, having qualified in 2012–13 but not in 2013–14. The team was eliminated in the first round of the Stanley Cup playoffs, losing in seven games to the Washington Capitals.

== Off-season ==
On May 22, 2014, the Islanders signed unrestricted free agent goaltender Jaroslav Halak to a four-year extension to keep him under contract through the 2017–18 season after trading for him from the Washington Capitals for the Blackhawks' fourth-round pick in the 2014 Entry Draft earlier in the month. On July 2, the Islanders signed Nikolay Kulemin and Mikhail Grabovski, who were both teammates on the Toronto Maple Leafs and were only interested in signing with the same team because of their strong chemistry. The Islanders also acquired two defenseman on October 4, 2014, one week before their first regular season game—Johnny Boychuk was traded from the Boston Bruins in exchange for 2015 (used on Brandon Carlo) and 2016 draft picks, while Nick Leddy was traded from the Chicago Blackhawks along with amateur goaltender Kent Simpson in exchange for T. J. Brennan, Ville Pokka and the rights to Anders Nilsson.

== Regular season ==
=== October–December ===
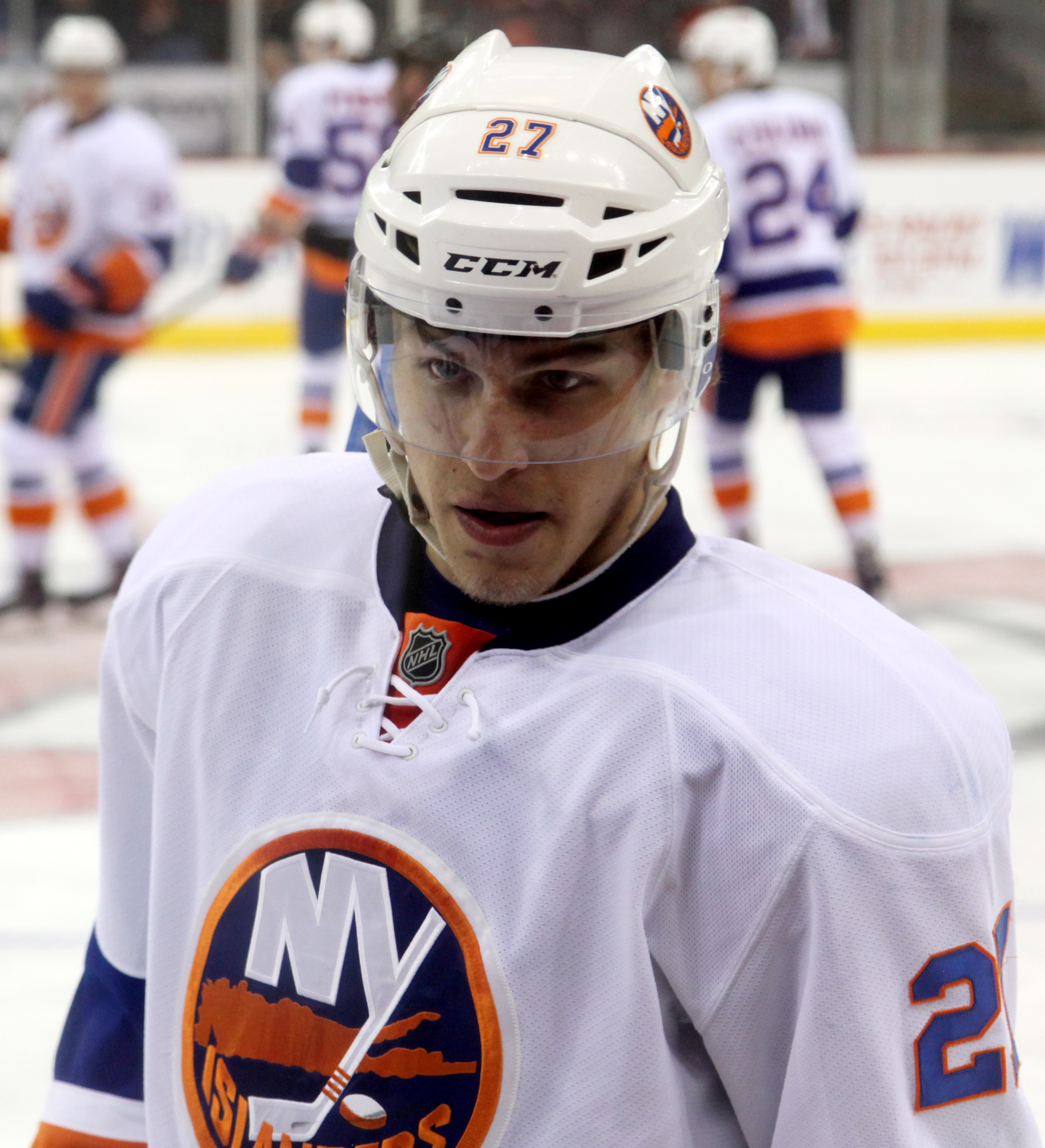
Anders Lee was recalled to the Islanders in October.

Before the Islanders began their regular season, Matt Carkner, Calvin de Haan, Michael Grabner and Lubomir Visnovsky were placed on injured reserve (IR), while previous first round Islanders draft picks, rookies Griffin Reinhart and Ryan Strome, impressed the coaching staff enough to make the opening night roster for their first times. The team won their first four consecutive games, including a back-to-back against the Carolina Hurricanes in games one and two. de Haan and Visnovsky returned to the team during October, leading to the decision to send Reinhart back to the Islanders' minor league affiliate, the American Hockey League's Bridgeport Sound Tigers. Soon after, injuries to Mikhail Grabovski and Josh Bailey led the team to call up Anders Lee from the Sound Tigers. As Lee began to cement his place on the roster and Grabovski was set to return, coaching staff had to make a decision in order to open up a roster spot, as only 23 players maximum are allowed on a team's roster before the trade deadline. Ultimately, rather than sending Lee back, it was Colin McDonald who was placed on waivers, which he cleared on his way to the Sound Tigers. Their 6–4–0 record by the end of October matched their best record in the team's first ten games since the 2001–02 season.

In recent seasons, the Islanders have not had positive results in the month of November. The previous season saw them finish with a November record of 4–13–1. Bailey returned from his hand injury during the month, while Eric Boulton, who had only played three games so far in the season, was placed on IR. They finished the month with an 11–3–0 record, only the second time in franchise history they recorded at least 11 wins in the month of November. It was also the first time they were undefeated in home games (6–0–0) during the month since the 1984–85 season. On November 28, Head Coach Jack Capuano recorded his 300th game with the team, a number not reached since Al Arbour hit the number in the team's early years, with the closest to Capuano being Terry Simpson with 81 Islanders' games coached.

As December began, injuries provided setbacks with Michael Grabner and Lubomir Visnovsky returning to the IR, joined by Johnny Boychuk, Travis Hamonic and Casey Cizikas. Visnovsky and Cizikas missed only two and three games respectively, but defenseman Boychuk and Hamonic needed the majority of the month to recover. Griffin Reinhart was recalled from the Sound Tigers at the beginning of the month, but was sent back down once the injured defenseman were set to return. Joining him on the Sound Tigers would be Cory Conacher, who was waived on December 13 after recording only three points in 15 games. Conacher was originally placed on the team's top line, alongside John Tavares and Kyle Okposo, however he did not last long there as the coaching staff began trying out various other players to fill the spot. Jaroslav Halak suffered a lower body injury on December 20, after recording his 11th consecutive win earlier in the month and passing the previous franchise record of 10 set by Billy Smith. The injury led to Kevin Poulin being called up from the Sound Tigers; he only played in one game, a 3–4 shootout loss to the Buffalo Sabres. Halak returned the following game, in a 4–3 overtime win against the Washington Capitals. The team finished the calendar year of 2014 with a share of first place in their division for the first time in 27 years.

=== January–April ===
The Islanders put together a 6–3–0 January record to bring into the All-Star Game break. Near the beginning of the month, Lubomir Visnovsky was placed back on IR with an upper body injury and would later be joined by Eric Boulton with a lower-body injury, who had been taken off the list about a month prior on December 11 and only played once since. Michael Grabner returned from his lower body injury on January 6 after missing eight games. On January 10, John Tavares was named to the All-Star Game as the sole representative of the Islanders. After injuries to goaltenders Jimmy Howard of the Detroit Red Wings and Pekka Rinne of the Nashville Predators, Halak and the Pittsburgh Penguins' Marc-Andre Fleury were named as their replacements. At the All-Star Game, Tavares scored four goals, matching an All-Star Game record for an individual player's goals scored, while Halak stopped six of tens shots in the third period; their team, captained by Jonathan Toews of the Chicago Blackhawks, won the game by a record-setting score of 17–12. After the break, it was announced that alternate captain Kyle Okposo would miss six-to-eight weeks after receiving an upper-body injury, later revealed to be a detached retina that he had recently received surgery for. The injury led to Cal Clutterbuck being named as an alternate captain. In their first game back from the break, the Islanders defeated the rival New York Rangers, earning their third consecutive victory over the team, all by a gap of three goals; this marked the first time the Islanders won three consecutive games against the Rangers since 2007.

On February 19, Halak tied a franchise record for most wins in a season after earning his 32nd against the Nashville Predators, with 30 saves against 32 shots. He went on to break the record, recording his 33rd win of the season on February 27, in a 2–1 victory over the Calgary Flames. Injuries continued rolling, with Casey Cizikas and Mikhail Grabovski both being placed on IR, with a lower body injury and an upper body injury, respectively. Matt Carkner was removed from IR after spending the entire season sidelined from back surgery, and was sent to the Sound Tigers after clearing waivers. As the team continued their push for the top spot in the Metropolitan Division standings, it was announced that defenseman Nick Leddy signed a seven-year contract worth $38.5 million on February 24.

Going into it, I thought our team deserved an opportunity to build off what they started here in the first three quarters of the season. I think there's a lot of good chemistry and it's a team in that locker room. We didn't want to delete any of the players out of it if we could.

— Islanders General Manager Garth Snow, on the NHL trade deadline

The NHL trade deadline on March 5 ended with the Islanders making four trades. Two of the trades involved minor league players Cory Conacher and David Leggio sent to the Vancouver Canucks and Arizona Coyotes, respectively, in exchange for Dustin Jeffrey and Mark Louis. Halak received a new backup goaltender when Chad Johnson was sent to the Buffalo Sabres, with the Islanders picking up Michal Neuvirth in return. General Manager Garth Snow cited Neuvirth's good play during the season and Johnson's relatively poor performance thus far as the reason for the trade; Johnson had attained an 8–8–1 record with a .889 save percentage with the Islanders. Outside of the goaltending change, the main roster went untouched with the exception of adding Tyler Kennedy, who was acquired from the San Jose Sharks in exchange for a conditional 2015 draft pick. Snow recognized the team's chemistry as the main reason for not making any major main roster trades. The first game the Islanders played after the trade deadline was set to debut Kennedy, but an upper body injury announced just before the start of the game prevented him from playing. During the game, Matt Martin kneed Dallas Stars defenseman Trevor Daley, resulting in a one-game suspension. With Kennedy injured and Martin suspended, Eric Boulton and Casey Cizikas were activated off of IR before the next game on March 5 against the Nashville Predators after missing 19 and eight games, respectively. The following game featured the debut for Neurvirth with the Islanders, as the team fell in a shootout to the Florida Panthers. Capuano chose to start him again the following game, as Neuvirth picked up his first win with the team in a 4–3 overtime victory against the Toronto Maple Leafs on March 9.

Without Nick Leddy, who was injured against the Maple Leafs, the Islanders faced the Rangers on March 10 for their fourth matchup of the season, which ended in a Rangers victory for the first time of the season series. The Islanders dropped their next three as they continued playing short of Leddy, stringing together a four-game losing streak for the first time in the season. During the stretch, Jaroslav Halak missed two games due to a lower-body injury. Halak and Leddy both returned the following game against the New Jersey Devils on March 21, as Halak shut out the Devils in a 3–0 victory. The team's struggles continued as they looked to secure a playoff berth, going 2–3–2 over the next seven games before their trip to the postseason was locked in on April 9; the Florida Panthers defeated the Boston Bruins and eliminated the possibility of the ninth-seeded Bruins catching the Islanders in the standings. Despite having clinched, the following game against the Pittsburgh Penguins had high stakes, with the Penguins still chasing a playoffs spot and the Islanders looking to get the home-ice advantage in the first round of the playoffs; the Islanders ultimately won, 3–1, and locked up an opening playoff series against the Washington Capitals. The final game of the season, which was also the final regular-season game the Islanders would play at Nassau Coliseum (until the 2018–19 NHL season), was a 5–4 shootout loss to the Columbus Blue Jackets, as the Islanders were unable to pick up both points with home-ice advantage against the Capitals on the line.

== Playoffs ==
The New York Islanders entered the playoffs as the Metropolitan Division's third seed. They lost to the Washington Capitals in seven games.

== Standings ==
Metropolitan Division
Pos	Team	GP	W	L	OTL	ROW	GF	GA	GD	Pts
1	p – New York Rangers	82	53	22	7	49	252	192	+60	113
2	x – Washington Capitals	82	45	26	11	40	242	203	+39	101
3	x – New York Islanders	82	47	28	7	40	252	230	+22	101
4	x – Pittsburgh Penguins	82	43	27	12	39	221	210	+11	98
5	Columbus Blue Jackets	82	42	35	5	33	236	250	−14	89
6	Philadelphia Flyers	82	33	31	18	30	215	234	−19	84
7	New Jersey Devils	82	32	36	14	27	181	216	−35	78
8	Carolina Hurricanes	82	30	41	11	25	188	226	−38	71

Source: National Hockey League
p – Clinched Presidents' Trophy; x – Clinched playoff spot

== Schedule and results ==
=== Pre-season ===
2014 preseason game log: 4–2–1 (Home: 3–2–0; Road: 1–0–1)
#	Date	Visitor	Score	Home	OT	Decision	Attendance	Record	Recap
1^{[a]}	September 22	Ottawa	2–3	NY Islanders		Leggio		1–0–0	Recap
2^{[a]}	September 22	Ottawa	2–3	NY Islanders	SO	Poulin		2–0–0	Recap
3	September 24	Carolina	4–2	NY Islanders		Halak	9,888	2–1–0	Recap
4^{[b]}	September 26	New Jersey	2–3	NY Islanders	SO	Johnson	11,823	3–1–0	Recap
5	September 30	NY Islanders	5–3	Boston		Poulin	17,004	4–1–0	Recap
6	October 2	NY Islanders	1–2	New Jersey	SO	Halak	10,032	4–1–1	Recap
7^{[c]}	October 4	Boston	6–1	NY Islanders		Johnson		4–2–1	Recap
Notes: ^{a} Games were played at Mile One Centre in St. John's, Newfoundland.; ^{b} Game was played at Barclays Center in Brooklyn, New York.; ^{c} Game was played at Webster Bank Arena in Bridgeport, Connecticut.

=== Regular season ===
2014–15 Game Log

October: 6–4–0 (Home: 3–2–0; Road: 3–2–0)
#	Date	Visitor	Score	Home	OT	Decision	Attendance	Record	Pts	Recap
1	October 10	NY Islanders	5–3	Carolina		Halak	18,680	1–0–0	2	Recap
2	October 11	Carolina	3–4	NY Islanders		Johnson	16,170	2–0–0	4	Recap
3	October 14	NY Islanders	6–3	NY Rangers		Halak	18,006	3–0–0	6	Recap
4	October 16	San Jose	3–4	NY Islanders	SO	Halak	11,248	4–0–0	8	Recap
5	October 18	NY Islanders	1–3	Pittsburgh		Halak	18,655	4–1–0	8	Recap
6	October 21	Toronto	5–2	NY Islanders		Halak	11,408	4–2–0	8	Recap
7	October 23	NY Islanders	3–2	Boston		Johnson	17,565	5–2–0	10	Recap
8	October 25	Dallas	5–7	NY Islanders		Johnson	15,208	6–2–0	12	Recap
9	October 28	Winnipeg	4–3	NY Islanders		Halak	11,508	6–3–0	12	Recap
10	October 30	NY Islanders	0–5	Colorado		Johnson	12,892	6–4–0	12	Recap

November: 11–3–0 (Home: 6–0–0; Road: 5–3–0)
#	Date	Visitor	Score	Home	OT	Decision	Attendance	Record	Pts	Recap
11	November 1	NY Islanders	1–3	San Jose		Halak	17,562	6–5–0	12	Recap
12	November 5	NY Islanders	3–2	Anaheim	OT	Halak	16,448	7–5–0	14	Recap
13	November 6	NY Islanders	2–1	Los Angeles	SO	Johnson	18,230	8–5–0	16	Recap
14	November 8	NY Islanders	1–0	Arizona		Halak	14,689	9–5–0	18	Recap
15	November 11	Colorado	0–6	NY Islanders		Halak	12,888	10–5–0	20	Recap
16	November 14	NY Islanders	4–3	Florida	SO	Halak	10,010	11–5–0	22	Recap
17	November 15	NY Islanders	2–5	Tampa Bay		Johnson	19,204	11–6–0	22	Recap
18	November 18	Tampa Bay	2–5	NY Islanders		Halak	12,908	12–6–0	24	Recap
19	November 21	NY Islanders	5–4	Pittsburgh	SO	Johnson	18,653	13–6–0	26	Recap
20	November 22	Pittsburgh	1–4	NY Islanders		Halak	16,170	14–6–0	28	Recap
21	November 24	Philadelphia	0–1	NY Islanders	SO	Halak	12,409	15–6–0	30	Recap
22	November 26	Washington	2–3	NY Islanders	OT	Halak	16,170	16–6–0	32	Recap
23	November 28	NY Islanders	2–5	Washington		Johnson	18,506	16–7–0	32	Recap
24	November 29	New Jersey	1–3	NY Islanders		Halak	16,170	17–7–0	34	Recap

December: 8–4–1 (Home: 5–2–0; Road: 3–2–1)
#	Date	Visitor	Score	Home	OT	Decision	Attendance	Record	Pts	Recap
25	December 2	Ottawa	2–3	NY Islanders	OT	Halak	13,888	18–7–0	36	Recap
26	December 4	NY Islanders	2–1	Ottawa		Halak	20,511	19–7–0	38	Recap
27	December 6	St. Louis	6–4	NY Islanders		Halak	16,170	19–8–0	38	Recap
28	December 9	NY Islanders	4–5	Minnesota		Johnson	18,904	19–9–0	38	Recap
29	December 11	NY Islanders	3–6	St. Louis		Halak	18,028	19–10–0	38	Recap
30	December 13	Chicago	2–3	NY Islanders		Halak	16,170	20–10–0	40	Recap
31	December 15	New Jersey	2–3	NY Islanders	SO	Halak	13,408	21–10–0	42	Recap
32	December 19	NY Islanders	2–1	Detroit		Halak	20,027	22–10–0	44	Recap
33	December 20	Tampa Bay	1–3	NY Islanders		Halak	16,170	23–10–0	46	Recap
34	December 23	Montreal	3–1	NY Islanders		Johnson	16,170	23–11–0	46	Recap
35	December 27	NY Islanders	3–4	Buffalo	SO	Poulin	19,070	23–11–1	47	Recap
36	December 29	Washington	3–4	NY Islanders	OT	Halak	16,170	24–11–1	49	Recap
37	December 31	NY Islanders	5–2	Winnipeg		Halak	15,016	25–11–1	51	Recap

January: 7–5–0 (Home: 3–1–0; Road: 4–4–0)
#	Date	Visitor	Score	Home	OT	Decision	Attendance	Record	Pts	Recap
38	January 2	NY Islanders	2–1	Calgary		Halak	19,289	26–11–1	53	Recap
39	January 4	NY Islanders	2–5	Edmonton		Halak	16,839	26–12–1	53	Recap
40	January 6	NY Islanders	2–3	Vancouver		Halak	18,562	26–13–1	53	Recap
41	January 9	NY Islanders	3–2	New Jersey	OT	Halak	16,592	27–13–1	55	Recap
42	January 10	NY Islanders	5–2	Columbus		Johnson	16,589	28–13–1	57	Recap
43	January 13	NY Islanders	3–0	NY Rangers		Halak	18,006	29–13–1	59	Recap
44	January 16	Pittsburgh	3–6	NY Islanders		Halak	16,170	30–13–1	61	Recap
45	January 17	NY Islanders	4–6	Montreal		Halak	21,287	30–14–1	61	Recap
46	January 19	Philadelphia	4–7	NY Islanders		Halak	16,170	31–14–1	63	Recap
47	January 27	NY Rangers	1–4	NY Islanders		Halak	16,170	32–14–1	65	Recap
48	January 29	Boston	5–2	NY Islanders		Halak	16,170	32–15–1	65	Recap
49	January 31	NY Islanders	1–4	Detroit		Johnson	20,027	32–16–1	65	Recap

February: 9–5–1 (Home: 6–4–0; Road: 3–1–1)
#	Date	Visitor	Score	Home	OT	Decision	Attendance	Record	Pts	Recap
50	February 3	Florida	4–2	NY Islanders		Halak	14,704	32–17–1	65	Recap
51	February 5	NY Islanders	3–2	Philadelphia	SO	Halak	19,042	33–17–1	67	Recap
52	February 7	NY Islanders	1–2	Boston		Johnson	17,565	33–18–1	67	Recap
53	February 8	NY Islanders	3–2	Buffalo		Halak	18,900	34–18–1	69	Recap
54	February 10	Edmonton	2–3	NY Islanders		Halak	15,608	35–18–1	71	Recap
55	February 12	Toronto	2–3	NY Islanders		Halak	15,388	36–18–1	73	Recap
56	February 14	Columbus	3–6	NY Islanders		Halak	15,678	37–18–1	75	Recap
57	February 16	NY Rangers	6–5	NY Islanders		Halak	16,170	37–19–1	75	Recap
58	February 17	NY Islanders	4–1	Carolina		Johnson	12,665	38–19–1	77	Recap
59	February 19	Nashville	2–5	NY Islanders		Halak	16,170	39–19–1	79	Recap
60	February 21	NY Islanders	2–3	Washington	SO	Johnson	18,506	39–19–2	80	Recap
61	February 22	Vancouver	4–0	NY Islanders		Halak	16,170	39–20–2	80	Recap
62	February 24	Arizona	1–5	NY Islanders		Johnson	15,888	40–20–2	82	Recap
63	February 27	Calgary	1–2	NY Islanders		Halak	16,170	41–20–2	84	Recap
64	February 28	Carolina	5–3	NY Islanders		Halak	16,170	41–21–2	84	Recap

March: 4–6–3 (Home: 1–5–1; Road: 3–1–2)
#	Date	Visitor	Score	Home	OT	Decision	Attendance	Record	Pts	Recap
65	March 3	NY Islanders	2–3	Dallas	OT	Halak	17,453	41–21–3	85	Recap
66	March 5	NY Islanders	4–3	Nashville		Halak	17,113	42–21–3	87	Recap
67	March 7	NY Islanders	3–4	Florida	SO	Neuvirth	14,474	42–21–4	88	Recap
68	March 9	NY Islanders	4–3	Toronto	OT	Neuvirth	18,984	43–21–4	90	Recap
69	March 10	NY Rangers	2–1	NY Islanders		Halak	16,170	43–22–4	90	Recap
70	March 13	Ottawa	2–1	NY Islanders		Halak	16,170	43–23–4	90	Recap
71	March 14	Montreal	3–1	NY Islanders		Neuvirth	16,170	43–24–4	90	Recap
72	March 17	NY Islanders	1–4	Chicago		Neuvirth	22,080	43–25–4	90	Recap
73	March 21	NY Islanders	3–0	New Jersey		Halak	16,592	44–25–4	92	Recap
74	March 24	Minnesota	2–1	NY Islanders	SO	Halak	16,170	44–25–5	93	Recap
75	March 26	Los Angeles	3–2	NY Islanders		Halak	16,170	44–26–5	93	Recap
76	March 28	Anaheim	3–2	NY Islanders		Neuvirth	16,170	44–27–5	93	Recap
77	March 29	Detroit	4–5	NY Islanders		Halak	16,170	45–27–5	95	Recap

April: 2–1–2 (Home: 1–0–1; Road: 1–1–1)
#	Date	Visitor	Score	Home	OT	Decision	Attendance	Record	Pts	Recap
78	April 2	NY Islanders	3–4	Columbus	SO	Halak	15,361	45–27–6	96	Recap
79	April 4	Buffalo	0–3	NY Islanders		Halak	16,170	46–27–6	98	Recap
80	April 7	NY Islanders	4–5	Philadelphia		Halak	17,927	46–28–6	98	Recap
81	April 10	NY Islanders	3–1	Pittsburgh		Halak	18,673	47–28–6	100	Recap
82	April 11	Columbus	5–4	NY Islanders	SO	Halak	16,170	47–28–7	101	Recap

Legend: Win (2 points) Loss (0 points) Overtime/shootout loss (1 point)

=== Playoffs ===
2015 Stanley Cup Playoffs

Eastern Conference First Round vs. (M2) Washington Capitals: Washington wins 4–3
#	Date	Visitor	Score	Home	OT	Decision	Attendance	Series	Recap
1	April 15	NY Islanders	4–1	Washington		Halak	18,506	Islanders lead 1–0	Recap
2	April 17	NY Islanders	3–4	Washington		Halak	18,506	Series tied 1–1	Recap
3	April 19	Washington	1–2	NY Islanders	OT	Halak	16,170	Islanders lead 2–1	Recap
4	April 21	Washington	2–1	NY Islanders	OT	Halak	16,170	Series tied 2–2	Recap
5	April 23	NY Islanders	1–5	Washington		Halak	18,506	Capitals lead 3–2	Recap
6	April 25	Washington	1–3	NY Islanders		Halak	16,170	Series tied 3–3	Recap
7	April 27	NY Islanders	1–2	Washington		Halak	18,506	Capitals win 3–4	Recap

Legend: Win Loss

== Player statistics ==
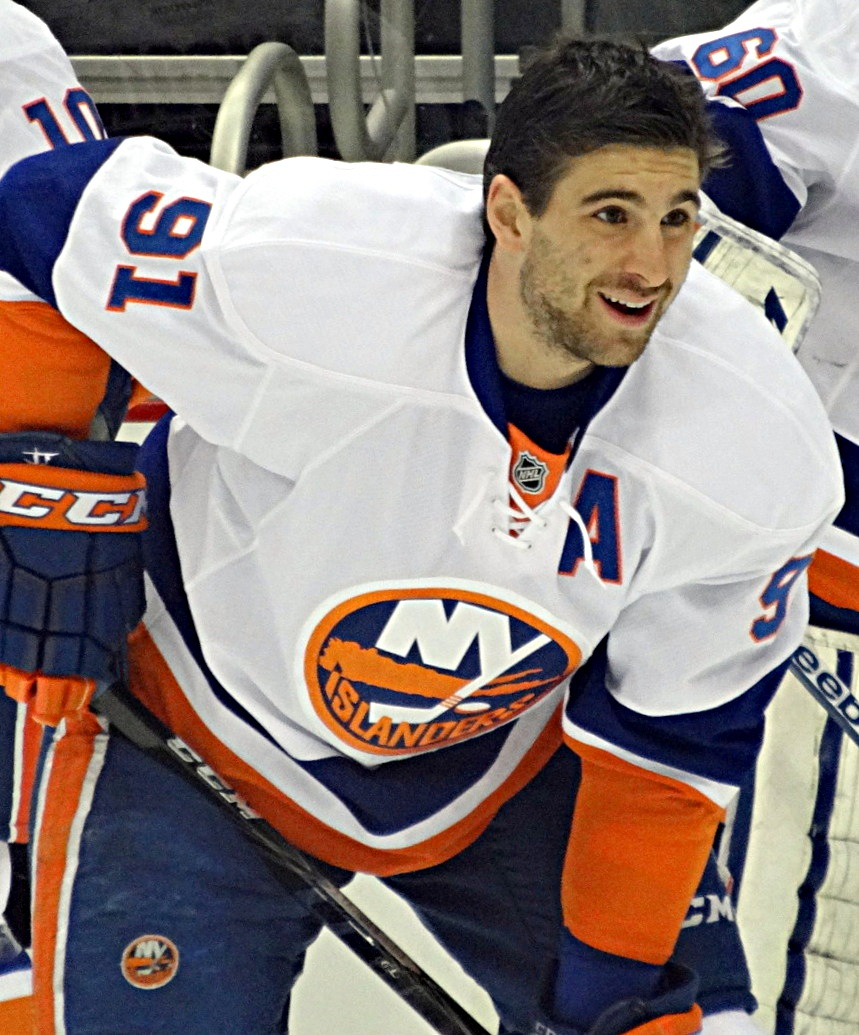
Islanders captain John Tavares led the team in goals, assists and points.

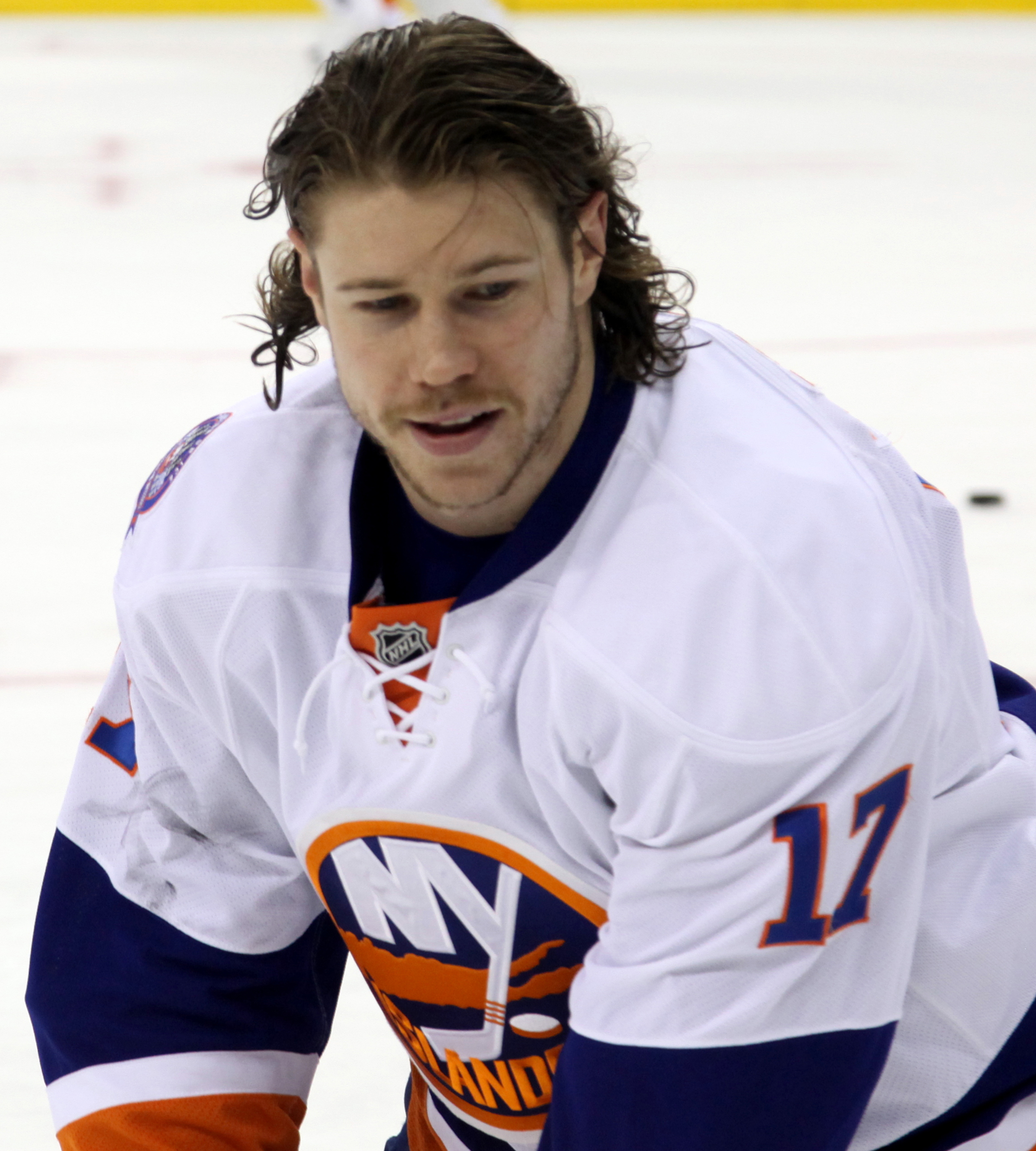
Forward Matt Martin led the team in penalty in minutes.

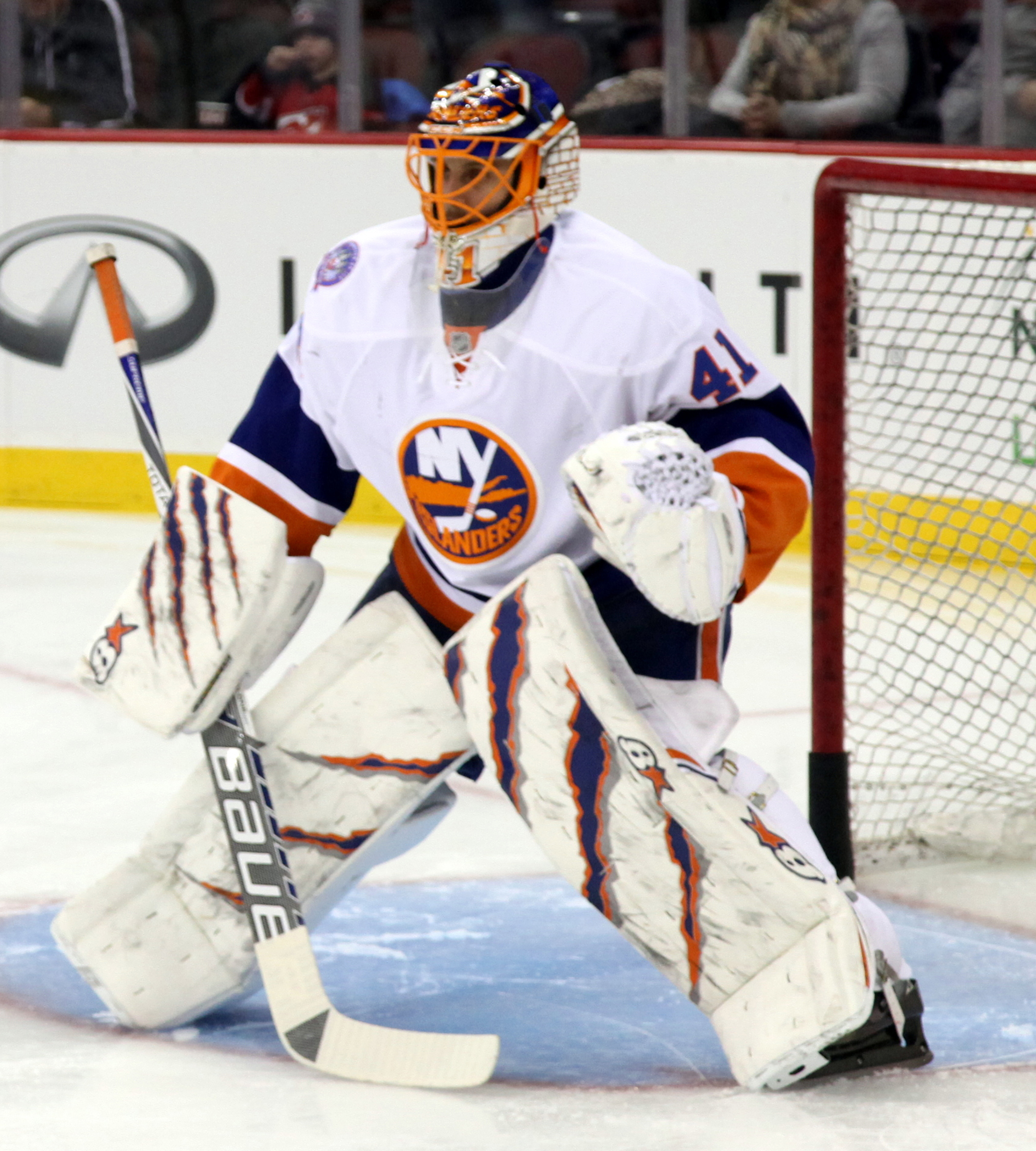
Goaltender Jaroslav Halak served as the team's starting goaltender.

Final stats

Skaters

Regular season
Player	GP	G	A	Pts	+/−	PIM
John Tavares	82	38	48	86	5	46
Kyle Okposo	60	18	33	51	−8	12
Ryan Strome	81	17	33	50	23	47
Frans Nielsen	78	14	29	43	8	12
Brock Nelson	82	20	22	42	6	24
Anders Lee	76	25	16	41	9	33
Josh Bailey	70	15	26	41	3	12
Nick Leddy	78	10	27	37	18	14
Johnny Boychuk	72	9	26	35	15	14
Travis Hamonic	71	5	28	33	15	85
Nikolay Kulemin	82	15	16	31	7	21
Thomas Hickey	81	2	20	22	−12	26
Lubomir Visnovsky	53	5	15	20	−3	8
Mikhail Grabovski	51	9	10	19	3	8
Casey Cizikas	70	9	9	18	−2	24
Cal Clutterbuck	76	7	9	16	1	60
Matt Martin	78	8	6	14	−4	114
Michael Grabner	34	8	5	13	4	4
Calvin de Haan	65	1	11	12	3	24
Colin McDonald	18	2	6	8	−3	0
Brian Strait	52	2	5	7	−1	32
Tyler Kennedy^{†}	13	2	3	5	−3	2
Cory Conacher^{‡}	15	1	2	3	−3	14
Matt Donovan	12	0	3	3	4	0
Eric Boulton	10	2	0	2	−1	30
Kael Mouillierat	6	1	1	2	−3	8
Griffin Reinhart	8	0	1	1	1	6
Harry Zolnierczyk	2	0	0	0	−1	0

Playoffs
Player	GP	G	A	Pts	+/−	PIM
John Tavares	7	2	4	6	2	2
Josh Bailey	7	2	3	5	1	0
Nick Leddy	7	0	5	5	0	0
Ryan Strome	7	2	2	4	1	2
Cal Clutterbuck	7	2	1	3	1	26
Kyle Okposo	7	2	1	3	1	2
Brock Nelson	6	2	0	2	1	2
Nikolay Kulemin	7	1	1	2	0	2
Frans Nielsen	7	1	1	2	−1	0
Lubomir Visnovsky	4	0	2	2	5	0
Johnny Boychuk	7	0	2	2	−1	2
Casey Cizikas	7	1	0	1	1	0
Matt Martin	7	0	1	1	1	12
Thomas Hickey	7	0	1	1	5	2
Calvin de Haan	5	0	1	1	−2	2
Anders Lee	5	0	1	1	−2	7
Michael Grabner	2	0	1	1	1	2
Scott Mayfield	2	0	0	0	−1	0
Mikhail Grabovski	3	0	0	0	−1	0
Matt Donovan	2	0	0	0	0	10
Brian Strait	7	0	0	0	−3	4
Colin McDonald	2	0	0	0	1	2
Tyler Kennedy	3	0	0	0	−3	2
Griffin Reinhart	1	0	0	0	−2	0

Goaltenders

Regular season
Player	GP	GS	TOI	W	L	OT	GA	GAA	SA	SV%	SO	G	A	PIM
Jaroslav Halak	59	59	3550	38	17	4	144	2.43	1673	0.914	6	0	1	2
Chad Johnson^{‡}	19	17	1053	8	8	1	54	3.08	488	0.889	0	0	0	0
Michal Neuvirth^{†}	5	5	306	1	3	1	15	2.94	126	0.881	0	0	0	0
Kevin Poulin	1	1	65	0	0	1	3	2.77	26	0.885	0	0	0	0

Playoffs
Player	GP	GS	TOI	W	L	GA	GAA	SA	SV%	SO	G	A	PIM
Jaroslav Halak	7	7	418	3	4	16	2.30	215	0.926	0	0	0	2
Michal Neuvirth	1	0	11	0	0	0	0.00	6	1.000	0	0	0	0

^{†}Denotes player spent time with another team before joining the Islanders. Stats reflect time with the Islanders only.
^{‡}Denotes player was traded mid-season. Stats reflect time with the Islanders only.
Bold/italics denotes franchise record.

== Notable achievements ==
=== Awards ===
Regular season
Player	Award	Awarded
Frans Nielsen	NHL Third Star of the Week	October 27, 2014
Jaroslav Halak	NHL First Star of the Week	December 1, 2014
Jaroslav Halak	NHL All-Star game replacement selection	January 15, 2015
John Tavares	NHL All-Star game selection	January 10, 2015
John Tavares	NHL Second Star of the Month (January 2015)	February 2, 2015
Kyle Okposo	NHL Third Star of the Week	January 19, 2015
Anders Lee	NHL Rookie of the Month (February 2015)	March 1, 2015

=== Milestones ===
Regular season
Player	Milestone	Reached
Griffin Reinhart	1st Career NHL Game	October 10, 2014
Griffin Reinhart	1st Career NHL Assist	December 9, 2014
Griffin Reinhart	1st Career NHL Point	December 9, 2014
Kyle Okposo	100th Career NHL Goal	October 14, 2014
Kyle Okposo	400th Career NHL Game	October 30, 2014
Kyle Okposo	300th Career NHL Point	March 24, 2015
Nikolay Kulemin	200th Career NHL Point	October 25, 2014
Nick Leddy	100th Career NHL Point	November 11, 2014
Nick Leddy	300th Career NHL Game	January 13, 2015
Jaroslav Halak	150th Career NHL Win	November 11, 2014
Jaroslav Halak	300th Career NHL Game	January 4, 2015
Jaroslav Halak	32nd win (tied franchise record)	February 19, 2015
Jaroslav Halak	33rd win (new franchise record)	February 27, 2015
Matt Martin	300th Career NHL Game	November 22, 2014
Brock Nelson	100th Career NHL Game	December 9, 2014
Brian Strait	100th Career NHL Game	January 13, 2015
John Tavares	200th Career NHL Assist	January 16, 2015
John Tavares	400th Career NHL Game	February 3, 2015
Johnny Boychuk	100th Career NHL Point	January 29, 2015
Josh Bailey	200th Career NHL Point	February 3, 2015
Michael Grabner	300th Career NHL Game	February 5, 2015
Calvin de Haan	100th Career NHL Game	February 7, 2015
Frans Nielsen	500th Career NHL Game	February 8, 2015
Travis Hamonic	300th Career NHL Game	February 17, 2015
Travis Hamonic	100th Career NHL Point	February 21, 2015
Kael Mouillierat	1st Career NHL Game	February 21, 2015
Kael Mouillierat	1st Career NHL Assist	February 24, 2015
Kael Mouillierat	1st Career NHL Point	February 24, 2015
Kael Mouillierat	1st Career NHL Goal	February 24, 2015

== Player injuries ==
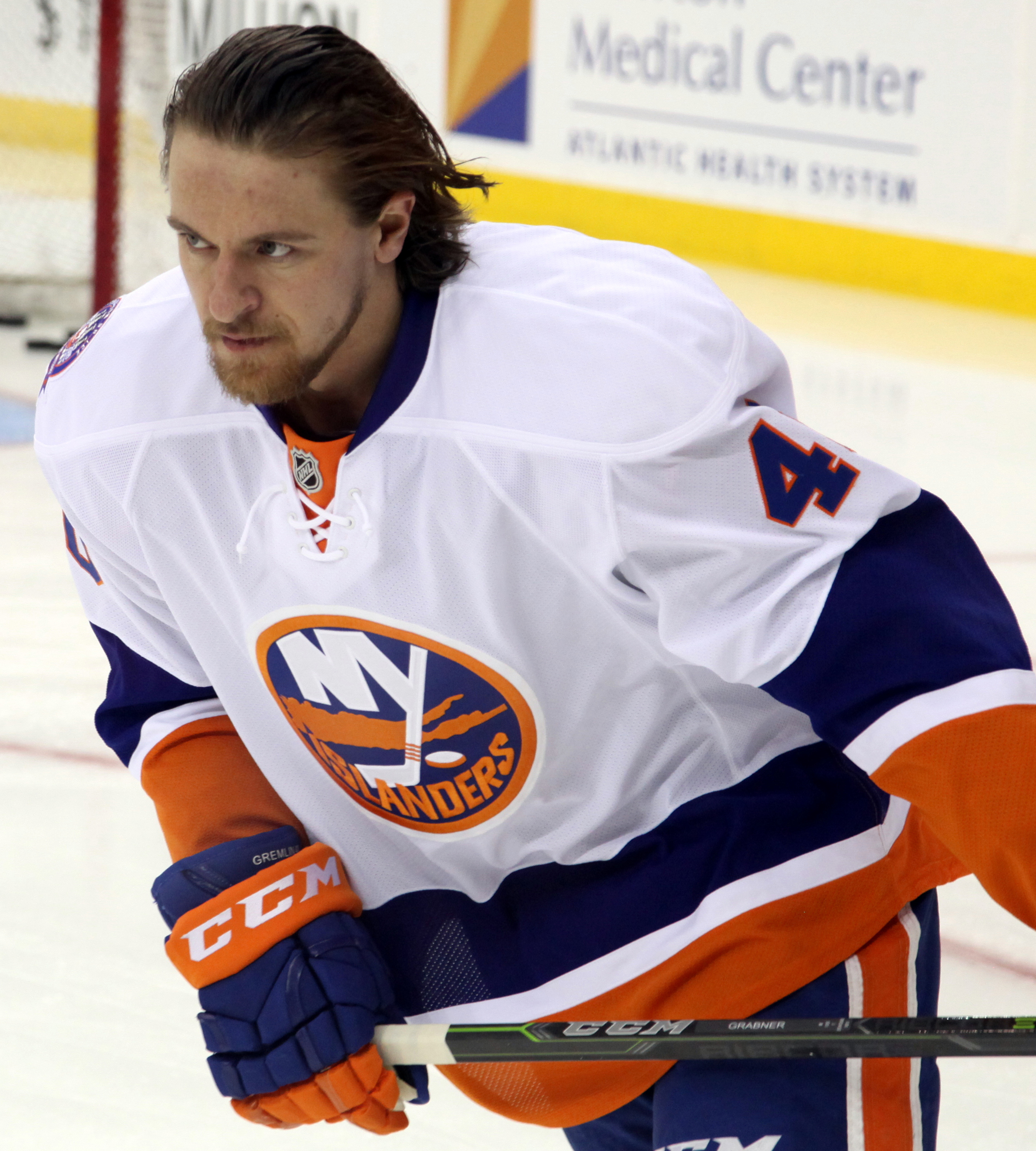
Michael Grabner missed 38 games due to injury over the course of three times on injured reserve.

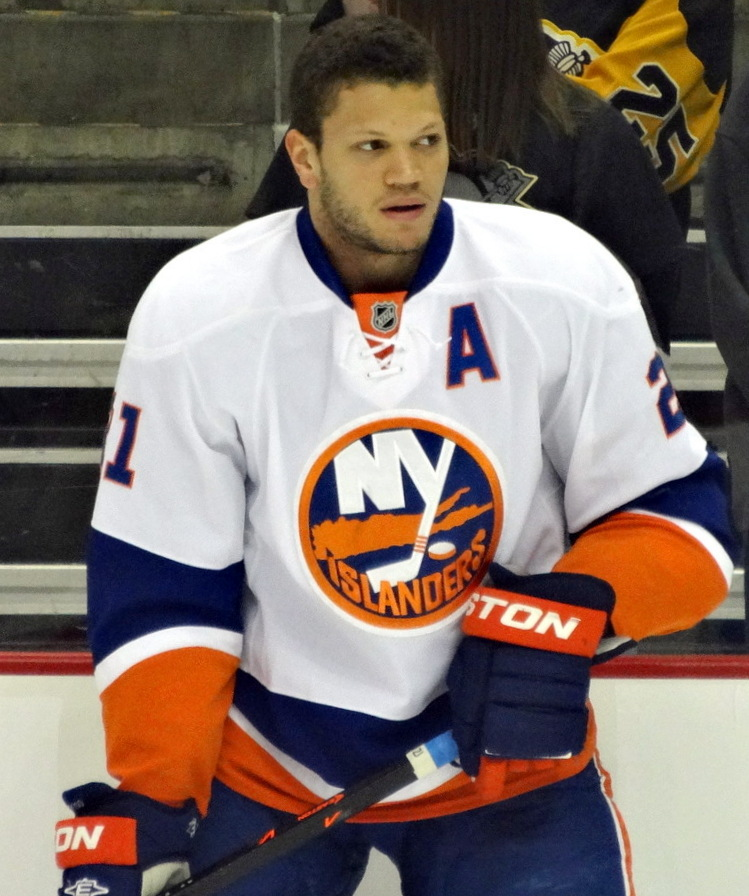
Kyle Okposo was put on the injured reserve list after a surgery to re-attach a retina, missing 22 games.

Updated as of February 15, 2014

New York Islanders 2014–15 player injuries
Player	Injury	Placed on IR	Removed from IR	Games missed
Matt Carkner	Back	September 22, 2014	February 15, 2015 (Note: Carkner was placed on waivers upon being removed from injured reserve.)	56
Calvin de Haan	Lower body	September 23, 2014	October 16, 2014	3
Michael Grabner	Lower body	September 26, 2014	December 3, 2014	24
Michael Grabner	Lower body	December 17, 2014	January 6, 2015	8
Michael Grabner	Undisclosed	February 7, 2015	February 17, 2015	6
Lubomir Visnovsky	Back	September 29, 2014	October 23, 2014	6
Lubomir Visnovsky	Undisclosed	December 3, 2014	December 9, 2014	2
Lubomir Visnovsky	Upper body	January 4, 2014	January 31, 2014	10
Mikhail Grabovski	Concussion	October 16, 2014	October 25, 2014	4
Mikhail Grabovski	Upper body	February 20, 2015	April 23, 2015	26
Josh Bailey	Hand	October 25, 2014	November 13, 2014	8
Eric Boulton	Lower body	November 13, 2014	December 11, 2014	12
Eric Boulton	Lower body	January 17, 2015	March 5, 2015	19
Travis Hamonic	Upper body	December 2, 2014	December 19, 2014	7
Johnny Boychuk	Undisclosed	December 3, 2014	December 19, 2014	6
Casey Cizikas	Upper body	December 6, 2014	December 15, 2015	3
Casey Cizikas	Lower body	February 16, 2015	March 5, 2015	8
Jaroslav Halak	Lower body	December 20, 2014	December 28, 2014	3
Kyle Okposo	Detached retina	January 19, 2015	March 10, 2015	22

== Player suspensions and fines ==
Two players received fines during the season, while only Matt Martin received a suspension. Anders Lee was given a $2,286.29 fine on December 9, 2014, for elbowing St. Louis Blues defenseman Carl Gunnarsson; the incident occurred during NHL Game No. 397 in New York on December 6, 2014, at 7:15 of the second period. Cal Clutterbuck received a fine on January 28, 2015, for $2,000 due to diving/embellishment, which occurred during NHL Game No. 676 in New York on January 19, 2015, at 19:04 of the second period. Martin received a one-game suspension with a $5,376.34 forfeit on March 5, 2015, for kneeing Dallas Stars defenseman Trevor Daley in NHL Game No. 948 the day prior; he was ejected from the game and received fifteen total penalty minutes.

== Transactions ==
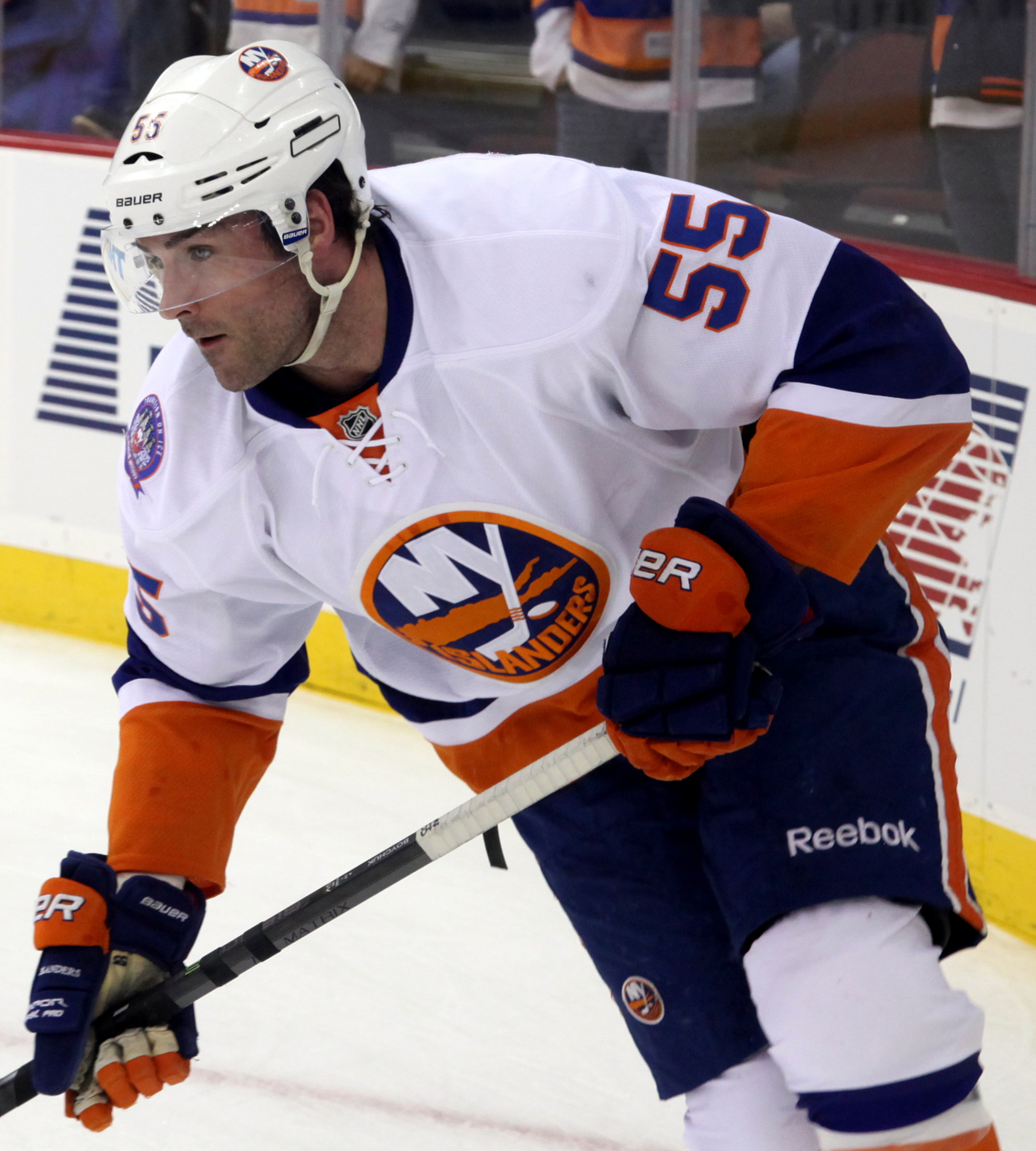
The Islanders acquired Johnny Boychuk from the Boston Bruins in a trade on October 4, 2014.

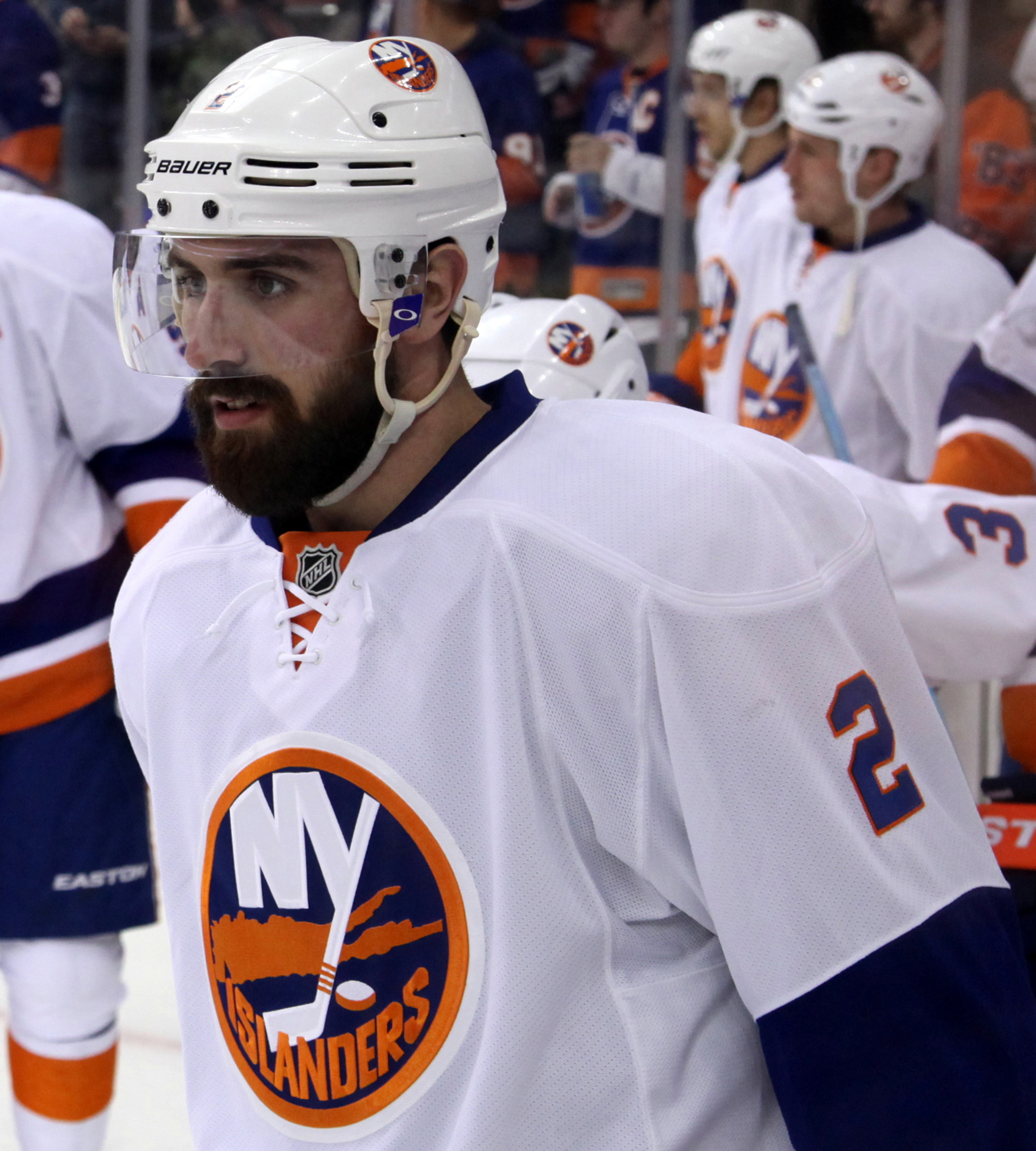
Nick Leddy was acquired from the Chicago Blackhawks in an October 4, 2014 trade.

Following the end of the Islanders' 2013–14 season, and during the 2014–15 season, this team has been involved in the following transactions:

=== Trades ===
Date	Details
June 27, 2014	To Tampa Bay Lightning 2nd-round pick in 2014; MTL's 2nd-round pick in 2014	To New York Islanders NYR's 1st-round pick in 2014
June 28, 2014	To Florida Panthers 3rd-round pick in 2014	To New York Islanders 3rd-round pick in 2015
June 28, 2014	To Tampa Bay Lightning 7th-round pick in 2014	To New York Islanders 7th-round pick in 2014; 7th-round pick in 2015
October 4, 2014	To Boston Bruins PHI's 2nd-round pick in 2015 (Brandon Carlo); 2nd-round pick in 2016 conditional 3rd-round pick in 2015	To New York Islanders Johnny Boychuk
October 4, 2014	To Chicago Blackhawks T. J. Brennan; Anders Nilsson; Ville Pokka	To New York Islanders Nick Leddy; Kent Simpson
November 25, 2014	To Vancouver Canucks Andrey Pedan	To New York Islanders Alexandre Mallet; 3rd-round pick in 2016
March 2, 2015	To San Jose Sharks Conditional 7th-round pick in 2015	To New York Islanders Tyler Kennedy
March 2, 2015	To Buffalo Sabres Chad Johnson; 3rd-round pick in 2016	To New York Islanders Michal Neuvirth
March 2, 2015	To Vancouver Canucks Cory Conacher	To New York Islanders Dustin Jeffrey
March 2, 2015	To Arizona Coyotes David Leggio	To New York Islanders Mark Louis

=== Free agency ===
Free agents acquired
Date	Player	Former team	Contract terms (in U.S. dollars)
July 1, 2014	Chad Johnson	Boston Bruins	2 years, $2.6 million
July 1, 2014	T. J. Brennan	Toronto Marlies	1 year, $600,000
July 1, 2014	Kael Mouillierat	St. John's IceCaps	1 year, $675,000
July 1, 2014	Cory Conacher	Buffalo Sabres	1 year, $600,000
July 1, 2014	David Leggio	Hershey Bears	1 year, $700,000
July 1, 2014	Jack Skille	Columbus Blue Jackets	1 year, $750,000
July 1, 2014	Harry Zolnierczyk	Pittsburgh Penguins	1 year, $650,000
July 1, 2014	Mikhail Grabovski	Washington Capitals	4 years, $20 million
July 1, 2014	Nikolay Kulemin	Toronto Maple Leafs	4 years, $16.75 million
March 31, 2015	Ross Johnston	Charlottetown Islanders	3 years, entry-level contract

The Islanders lost two players to free agency on July 1, 2014 – goaltenders Anders Nilsson and Evgeni Nabokov. Nilsson signed a one-year contract with the Ak Bars Kazan of the Kontinental Hockey League (KHL), while Nabokov signed a one-year, $1.55 million contract with the Tampa Bay Lightning.

The team acquired nine free agents, all on July 1, 2014. Of the nine signed, five players played at least one regular season game with the team – Chad Johnson, Cory Conacher, Harry Zolnierczyk, Mikhail Grabovski and Nikolay Kulemin, though Conacher and Zolnierczyk have spent the majority of the season with the Islanders' AHL affiliate, the Bridgeport Sound Tigers.

=== Waivers transactions ===
One player was picked up off waivers during the season – Jack Skille was claimed by the Columbus Blue Jackets on October 5, 2014. Seven other players were put on waivers by the Islanders during the season and sent to the Sound Tigers once cleared: David Leggio, Kevin Poulin, Harry Zolnierczyk, Aaron Ness, Colin McDonald, Cory Conacher and Matt Carkner. Poulin, Zolnierczyk, and McDonald were all recalled to the Islanders at least once during the regular season.

=== Player signings ===
Date	Player	Contract terms (in U.S. dollars)
July 15, 2014	Casey Cizikas	2 years, $2 million
July 15, 2014	Calvin de Haan	3 years, $5.9 million
July 24, 2014	Kevin Poulin	1 year, $650,000
September 29, 2014	Michael Dal Colle	3 years, $9.375 million entry-level contract
October 4, 2014	Joshua Ho-Sang	3 years, $3.4125 million entry-level contract
February 24, 2015	Nick Leddy	7 years, $38.5 million contract extension
March 12, 2015	Johnny Boychuk	7 years, $42 million contract extension
April 2, 2015	Stephon Williams	2 years, entry-level contract
April 8, 2015	Kyle Burroughs	3 years, entry-level contract

== Draft picks ==
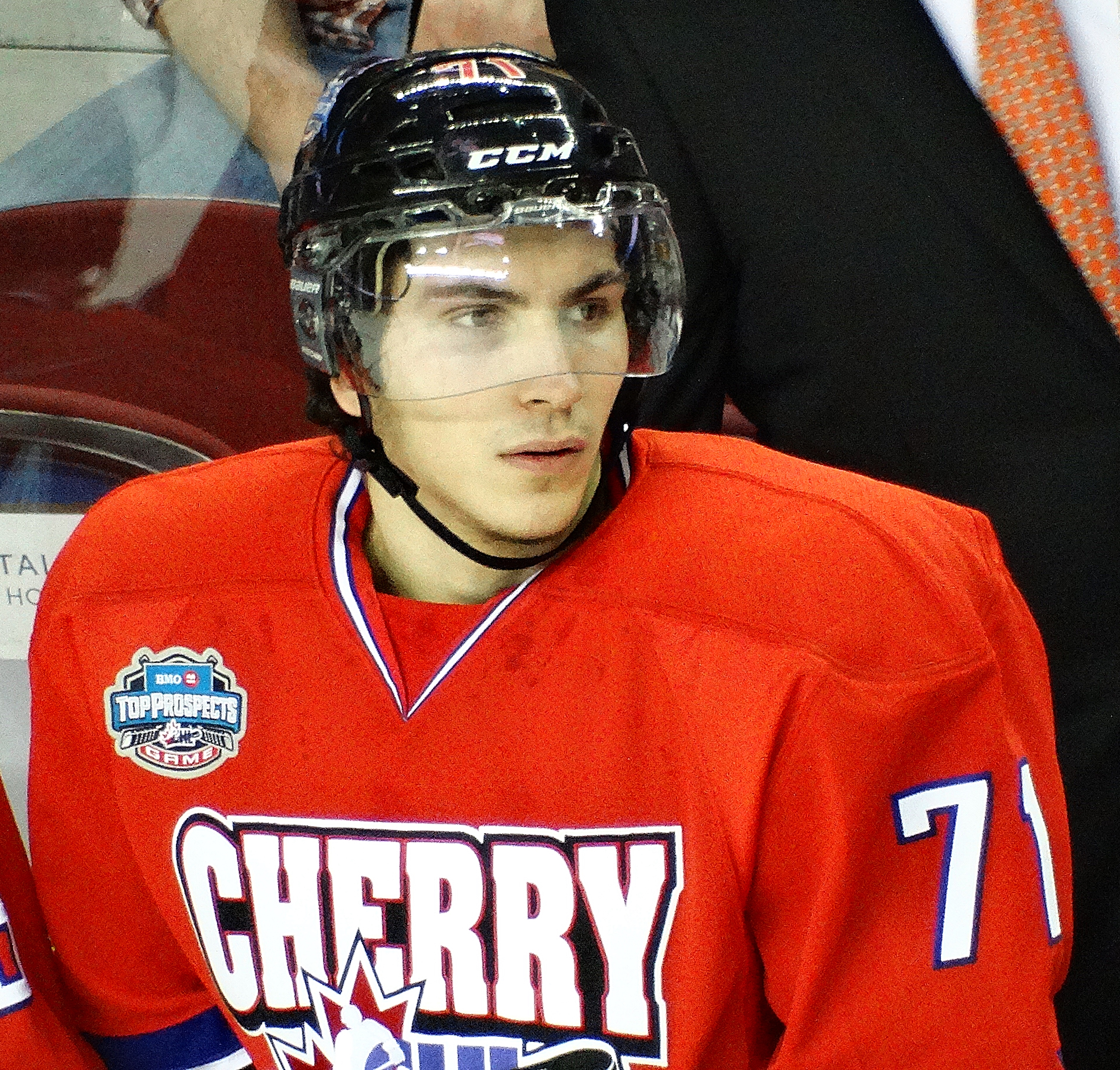
Michael Dal Colle was the Islanders' first selection at the draft, taken fifth overall in round 1

The 2014 NHL entry draft was held on June 27–28, 2014 at the Wells Fargo Center in Philadelphia, Pennsylvania. The Islanders finished 26th overall in the league standings during the 2013–14 season, to secure the fifth overall pick.

The team's two second-round picks went to the Tampa Bay Lightning as a result of a trade on June 27, 2014, that sent a 2014 first-round pick to the Islanders. Their third-round pick went to the Florida Panthers as a result of a trade on that sent a 2015 third-round pick to the Islanders. The Islanders' fifth-round pick and Thomas Vanek were traded to the Montreal Canadiens on March 5, 2014, in exchange for Sebastian Collberg and a conditional second-round pick in 2014; the condition was based on the Canadiens qualifying for the 2014 playoffs. The team's seventh-round pick went to the Lightning as a result of a trade that sent the Lightning's seventh round picks in 2014 and 2015 to the Islanders.

Round	#	Player	Pos	Nationality	College/Junior/Club team (League)
1	5	Michael Dal Colle	LW	Canada	Oshawa Generals (OHL)
1	28 (Note: The Tampa Bay Lightning's first-round pick (originally from the New York Rangers) went to the New York Islanders as a result of a trade on June 27, 2014 that sent two 2014 second-round picks (#35–Dominik Masin, #57–Johnathan MacLeod) to the Lightning in exchange for this pick.)	Joshua Ho-Sang	C/RW	Canada	Windsor Spitfires (OHL)
3	78 (Note: The Philadelphia Flyers' third-round pick went to the New York Islanders as a result of a trade on March 4, 2014 that sent Andrew MacDonald to the Flyers in exchange for Matt Mangene, 2015 second-round pick and this pick.)	Ilya Sorokin	G	Russia	Metallurg Novokuznetsk (KHL)
4	95	Linus Soderstrom	G	Sweden	Djurgardens IF (Sweden-Jr)
4	108 (Note: The Philadelphia Flyers' fourth-round pick went to the New York Islanders as a result of a trade on June 12, 2013 that sent Mark Streit to the Flyers in exchange for Shane Harper and this pick.)	Devon Toews	D	Canada	Quinnipiac Bobcats (ECAC Hockey)
6	155	Kyle Schempp	C	United States	Ferris State University (WCHA)
7	200 (Note: The Lightning's seventh-round pick went to the New York Islanders as a result of a June 28, 2014 trade that sent a 2014 seventh-round pick to the Islanders in exchange for this pick.)	Lukas Sutter	C	United States	Red Deer Rebels (WHL)
