= Harry Zolnierczyk =

Canadian ice hockey player

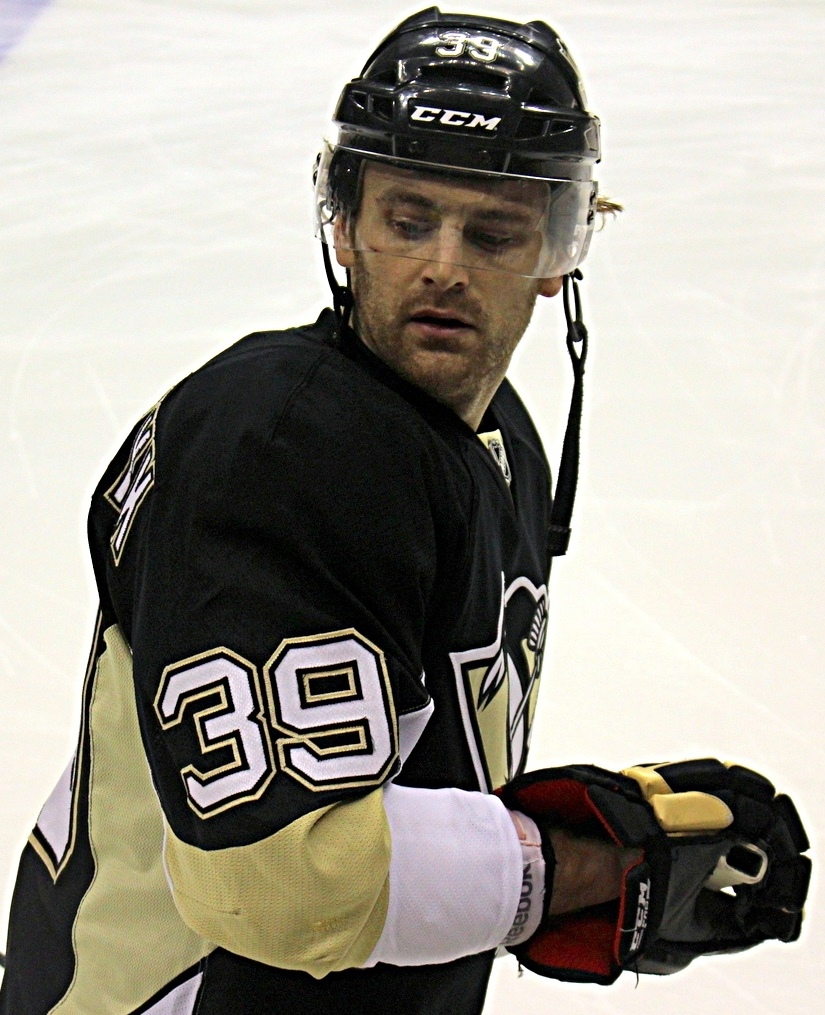
- Zolnierczyk with the Pittsburgh Penguins in 2013
- Height: 5 ft 11 in (180 cm)
- Weight: 180 lb (82 kg; 12 st 12 lb)
- Position: Wing
- Shot: Left
- Played for: Philadelphia Flyers; Pittsburgh Penguins; New York Islanders; Anaheim Ducks; Nashville Predators
- NHL draft: Undrafted
- Playing career: 2010–2019

Harrison Zolnierczyk is a Canadian former professional ice hockey left winger. Zolnierczyk was never drafted into the National Hockey League (NHL) but played for the Philadelphia Flyers, Pittsburgh Penguins, New York Islanders, Anaheim Ducks and Nashville Predators.

== Playing career ==
As a youth, Zolnierczyk played in the 2001 Quebec International Pee-Wee Hockey Tournament with the Mississauga Senators minor ice hockey team.

Prior to turning professional, Zolnierczyk played junior A for the Alberni Valley Bulldogs of the BCHL from 2005–2007 before attending Brown University where he played four seasons with the Brown Bears in Division I of the NCAA, ECAC conference. In his senior season with Brown, Zolnierczyk was named team captain, replacing graduating captain Aaron Volpatti. After scoring 31 points, including a career-high 16 goals, Zolnierczyk was named Ivy League Player of the Year.

On March 8, 2011, Zolnierczyk signed a one-year, $900,000 entry-level contract with the Philadelphia Flyers to take effect at the outset of the 2011–12 season. Less than a week later, he signed an amateur tryout contract with the Flyers' American Hockey League (AHL) affiliate, the Adirondack Phantoms. In sixteen games with the Phantoms, Zolnierczyk finished the 2010–11 season with three goals, two assists, and 37 penalty minutes.

After being cut by the Flyers on October 4, 2011, following his first NHL training camp and pre-season, Zolnierczyk was assigned to the Phantoms to begin his first full professional ice hockey season. On October 18, 2011, the Flyers re-called Zolnierczyk to replace injured forward Andreas Nödl in a game against the Ottawa Senators. In the first game of his NHL career, he scored his first NHL goal with 45 seconds remaining in the third period against Senators' goaltender Craig Anderson. On March 3, 2013, the league suspended him for four games for charging Mike Lundin during the game.

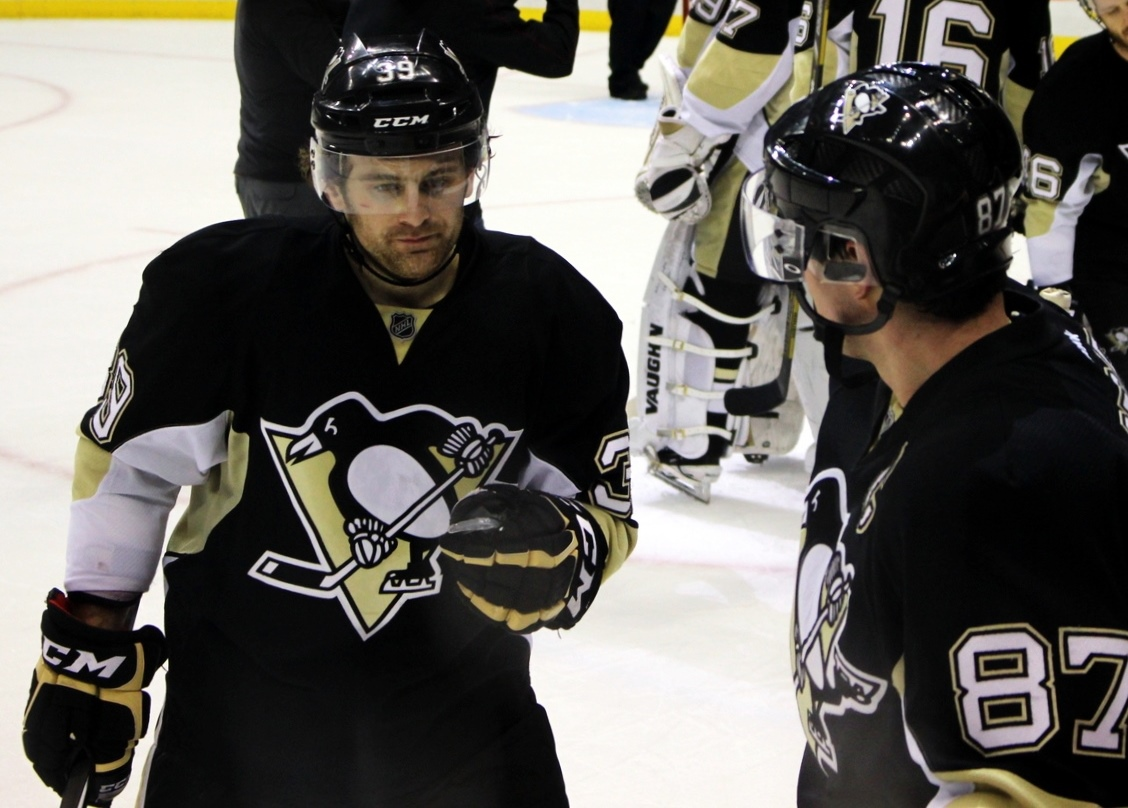
Zolnierczyk celebrates a win with Pittsburgh Penguins captain Sidney Crosby

On April 1, 2013, Zolnierczyk was traded to the Anaheim Ducks in exchange for enforcer Jay Rosehill. Two months later on June 24, 2013, the Ducks traded him to the Pittsburgh Penguins in exchange for defenceman Alex Grant. On July 12, 2013, the Penguins signed him to a one-year, two-way contract, worth $550,000.

On July 1, 2014, Zolnierczyk left the Penguins and agreed to a one-year, two-way free agent contract with the New York Islanders. He was assigned to their AHL affiliate, the Bridgeport Sound Tigers, after clearing waivers. Later on in the Islanders' 2014–15 season, he was recalled to the team along with Colin McDonald after injuries sidelined forwards Michael Grabner and Cal Clutterbuck, but was returned to the Sound Tigers after two games.

On July 3, 2015, Zolnierczyk signed as a free agent to a one-year, two-way contract with the Anaheim Ducks.

On July 1, 2016, having concluded his contract with the Ducks, Zolnierczyk agreed to a one-year, two-way deal with his fifth NHL club, the Nashville Predators. Zolnierczyk split the 2016–17 season evenly between the Predators and Milwaukee Admirals of the AHL. Adding a physical presence to the fourth line of the Predators, Zolnierczyk appeared in 24 games for 2 goals and 4 points. He made his post-season debut in featuring in 11 games for 3 points as the Predators made it to the Stanley Cup finals.

A free agent in the off-season, Zolnierczyk signed a professional try-out contract to attend training camp with the Florida Panthers on August 31, 2017. Despite initial reports of being a contract, Zolnierczyk was released from his try-out following the conclusion of training camp and the pre-season on October 1, 2017. Two days later, Zolnierczyk was announced to have returned to the Nashville Predators, re-signing on a one-year, two-way contract for the 2017–18 season.

Having played two seasons within the Predators organization, Zolnierczyk was reacquainted with the Florida Panthers, securing a one-year AHL contract with their affiliate Springfield Thunderbirds, on July 12, 2018.

As a free agent from the Thunderbirds, Zolnierczyk agreed to a one-year AHL contract with the Hartford Wolf Pack, affiliate of the New York Rangers, on July 1, 2019. Zolnierczyk failed to report for training camp with the Wolf Pack, opting to end his professional career prior to the 2019–20 season.

== Personal life ==
In November 2006, Zolnierczyk and his Alberni Valley Bulldogs teammate Brad Harding secretly used a webcam to record Harding having consensual sex with a 17-year-old girl. Zolnierczyk later shared the video with a number of friends and teammates via email. In 2008, he pled guilty to two counts of electronic voyeurism and received a conditional discharge, leaving him with no criminal record after three years.

On June 6, 2017, it was announced that Zolnierczyk would participate in the Foxboro Summer Pro League, at the Foxboro Sports Center in Foxboro, Massachusetts, as the captain for Team Pop Tops. On August 23, 2017, at the Foxboro Sports Center, Zolnierczyk led his team to a 10–9 championship final win; he won an award for classiest player called the "Dennis Cutler Sportsmanship Award" after giving game-used sticks to two local teenagers who had supported the team.

Zolnierczyk played baseball during his youth, and played in the 2000 Little League World Series with High Park Little League of Toronto, Ontario.

== Career statistics ==
			Regular season					Playoffs
Season	Team	League	GP	G	A	Pts	PIM	GP	G	A	Pts	PIM
2005–06	Alberni Valley Bulldogs	BCHL	53	9	13	22	40	6	1	3	4	10
2006–07	Alberni Valley Bulldogs	BCHL	47	20	18	38	85	5	3	2	5	10
2007–08	Brown University	ECAC	16	0	3	3	2	—	—	—	—	—
2008–09	Brown University	ECAC	31	1	1	2	30	—	—	—	—	—
2009–10	Brown University	ECAC	37	13	20	33	78	—	—	—	—	—
2010–11	Brown University	ECAC	30	16	15	31	128	—	—	—	—	—
2010–11	Adirondack Phantoms	AHL	16	3	2	5	37	—	—	—	—	—
2011–12	Philadelphia Flyers	NHL	37	3	3	6	35	—	—	—	—	—
2011–12	Adirondack Phantoms	AHL	39	8	13	21	37	—	—	—	—	—
2012–13	Adirondack Phantoms	AHL	52	9	8	17	54	—	—	—	—	—
2012–13	Philadelphia Flyers	NHL	7	0	1	1	36	—	—	—	—	—
2012–13	Norfolk Admirals	AHL	9	2	0	2	14	—	—	—	—	—
2013–14	Wilkes-Barre/Scranton Penguins	AHL	57	18	18	36	75	17	3	7	10	10
2013–14	Pittsburgh Penguins	NHL	13	2	0	2	12	—	—	—	—	—
2014–15	Bridgeport Sound Tigers	AHL	60	18	26	44	78	—	—	—	—	—
2014–15	New York Islanders	NHL	2	0	0	0	0	—	—	—	—	—
2015–16	San Diego Gulls	AHL	24	6	3	9	31	4	0	0	0	0
2015–16	Anaheim Ducks	NHL	1	0	0	0	0	—	—	—	—	—
2016–17	Milwaukee Admirals	AHL	24	6	10	16	20	—	—	—	—	—
2016–17	Nashville Predators	NHL	24	2	2	4	10	11	1	2	3	0
2017–18	Milwaukee Admirals	AHL	73	21	21	42	62	—	—	—	—	—
2018–19	Springfield Thunderbirds	AHL	72	15	36	51	38	—	—	—	—	—
NHL totals			84	7	6	13	93	11	1	2	3	0

== Awards and honours ==
Award	Year
College
ECAC Hockey All-Academic Team	2009
Ivy League Player of the Year	2011
