= Colin McDonald (ice hockey) =

American ice hockey player (born 1984)

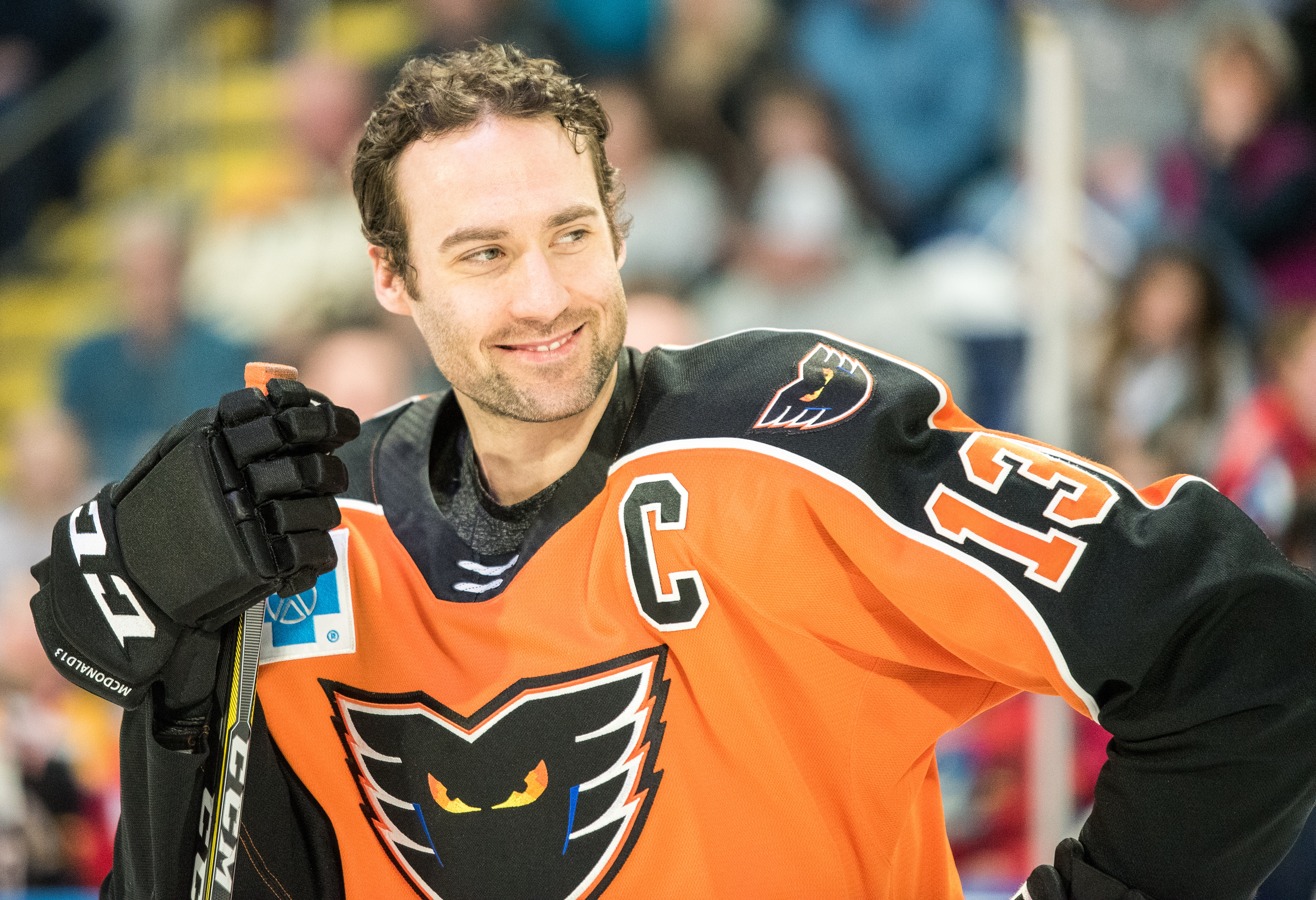
- McDonald with the Lehigh Valley Phantoms in 2019
- Born: September 30, 1984 (age 41) Wethersfield, Connecticut, U.S.
- Height: 6 ft 2 in (188 cm)
- Weight: 210 lb (95 kg; 15 st 0 lb)
- Position: Right wing
- Shot: Right
- Played for: Edmonton Oilers; Pittsburgh Penguins; New York Islanders; Philadelphia Flyers
- National team: United States
- NHL draft: 51st overall, 2003; Edmonton Oilers
- Playing career: 2007–2021

Colin J. McDonald (born September 30, 1984) is an American former professional ice hockey player. He last played for the Bridgeport Sound Tigers of the American Hockey League (AHL). He was selected by the Edmonton Oilers in the second round, 51st overall, of the 2003 NHL entry draft. He played only two games with the team before signing with the Pittsburgh Penguins for the 2011–12 season. His time with the Penguins was also short-lived, as he proceeded to sign with the Islanders the following season. He is the son of Gerry McDonald, a former NHL player, who played for the Hartford Whalers. On February 28, 2021, McDonald announced his retirement from playing hockey at the age of 36.

== Playing career ==
=== Amateur career ===
McDonald began his career playing for the New England Junior Coyotes of the Eastern Junior Hockey League (EJHL) during the 2002–03 season, where he led the league in scoring with 58 points (28 goals, 30 assists) and was named "Junior Coyote of the Year", and received the "EJHL Offensive Player of the Year Award" and League MVP. He was selected MVP of the Top Prospects Tournament in 2002, as well as "Hockey Night In Boston Junior Player of the Year". He was also chosen to the U.S. National Junior Team Evaluation Camp in August 2003.

After being selected 51st overall in the National Hockey League's (NHL) 2003 draft by the Edmonton Oilers, McDonald spent four seasons with Providence College. During his freshman year (2003–04), McDonald led Providence Friar freshmen with 10 goals. His performance earned him Providence's "Most Valuable Freshman" Award as well as a selection to the Hockey East All-Rookie Team. As a sophomore, McDonald missed time due to injury but still managed to match his point total from freshman year as he tallied up 11 goals and added 5 assists. As a junior, he served as an alternate captain and reached career highs in points (28) and assists (19), finishing fourth on his team in scoring. He was then named co-captain for the 2006-07 season at the end of the year. In his senior year he had a career high of 13 goals, along with 4 assists, totaling 17 points.

=== Professional career ===
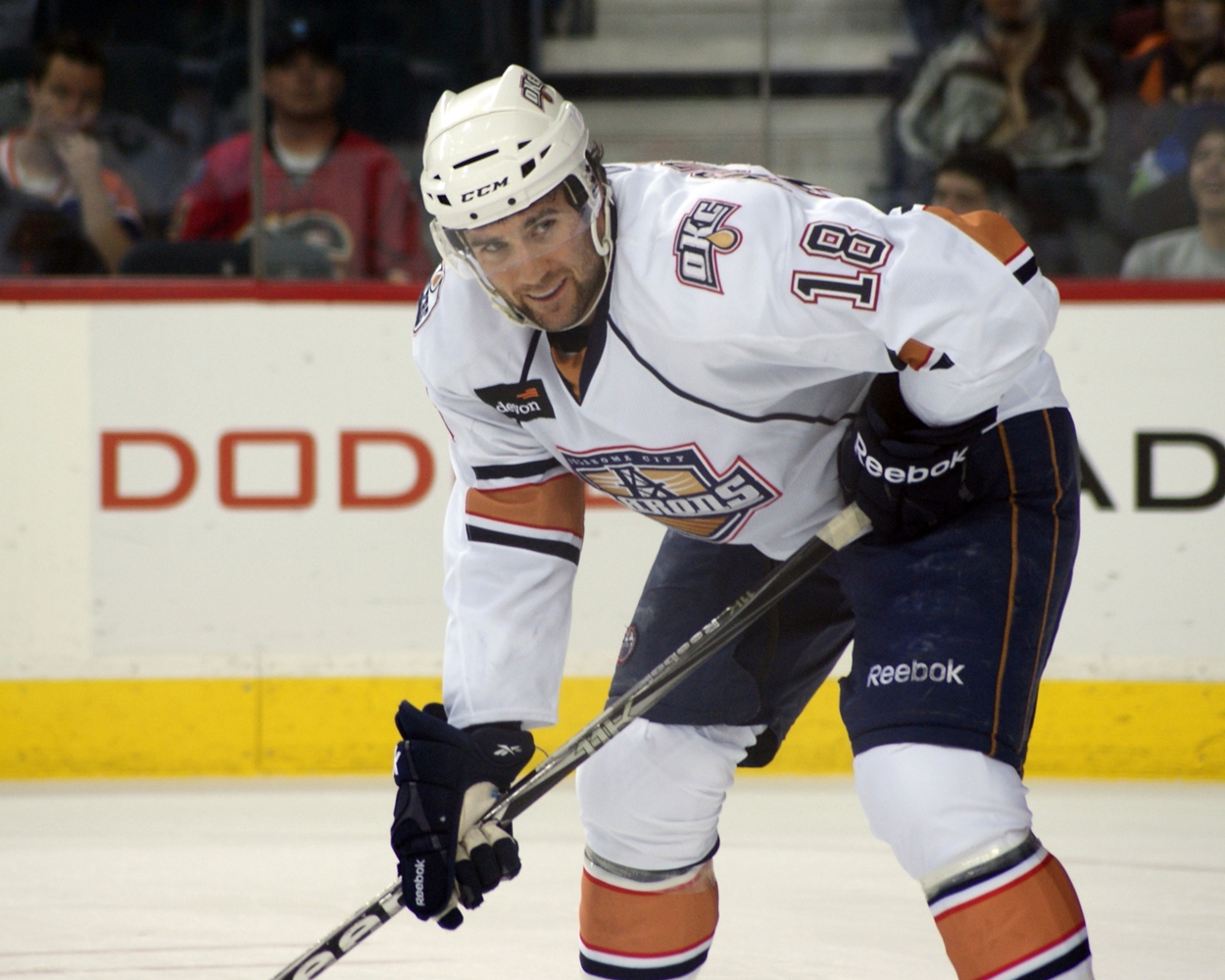
McDonald during the 2010–11 season with the Oklahoma City Barons

McDonald joined the Edmonton Oilers organization in 2007 and was assigned to their minor league affiliate, the American Hockey League's (AHL) Springfield Falcons. He played 73 games in his first season, scoring 12 goals and 11 assists for 23 points. The following season, McDonald played 77 games, scoring 10 goals and 12 assists for 22 points and also played 3 games in the ECHL for the Stockton Thunder. He was first called up to the Oilers on November 26, 2009. He played in his first career NHL game the next night against the San Jose Sharks. His first NHL goal came in his second game on November 28, 2009 against Roberto Luongo of the Vancouver Canucks.

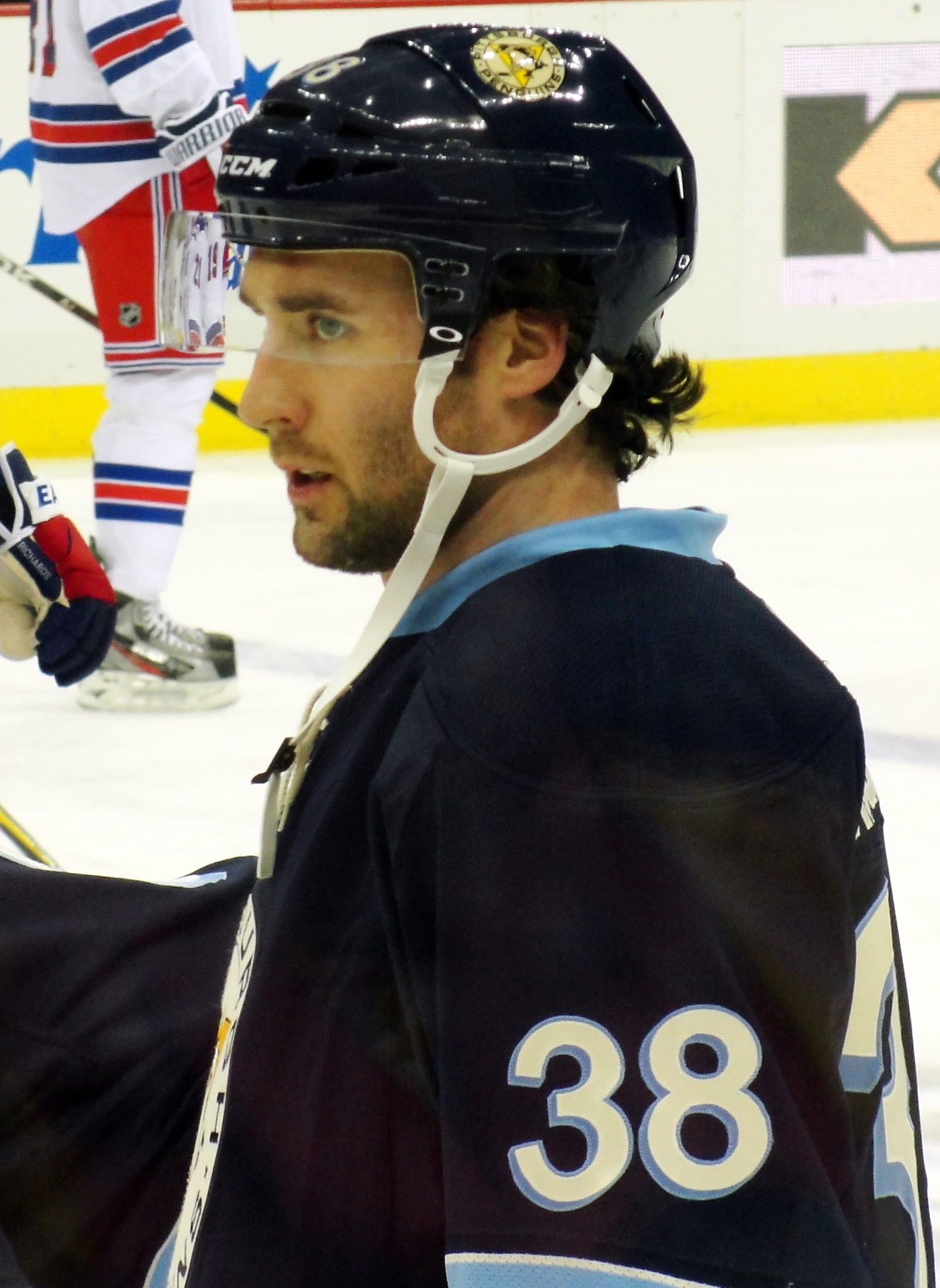
McDonald with the Pittsburgh Penguins in January 2012

On July 1, 2011, McDonald was signed by the Pittsburgh Penguins to a one-year, $525,000 contract. In the 2011–12 season, he was primarily assigned to the Penguins' AHL affiliate, the Wilkes-Barre/Scranton Penguins, but was recalled to play in five games with the Penguins.

On July 2, 2012, McDonald signed as a free agent to a one-year, two-way contract with the New York Islanders. During the season, on March 15, 2013, he agreed to a two-year, one-way contract extension. He played most of the season on a line with Matt Martin and Casey Cizikas. In the 2013 playoffs against his former Penguins team, he played on a line with Michael Grabner and Keith Aucoin, scoring two goals and one assist as the Islanders were defeated in six games.

Early on in the 2014–15 season, on October 22, 2014, McDonald was placed on waivers; upon clearing he was assigned to the Islanders' AHL affiliate, the Bridgeport Sound Tigers, where he was named captain.

On July 3, 2015, having left the Islanders as a free agent, McDonald signed a one-year, two-way contract with the Philadelphia Flyers.

On June 19, 2018, McDonald signed a one-year AHL contract to remain with the Flyers AHL affiliate, the Lehigh Valley Phantoms.

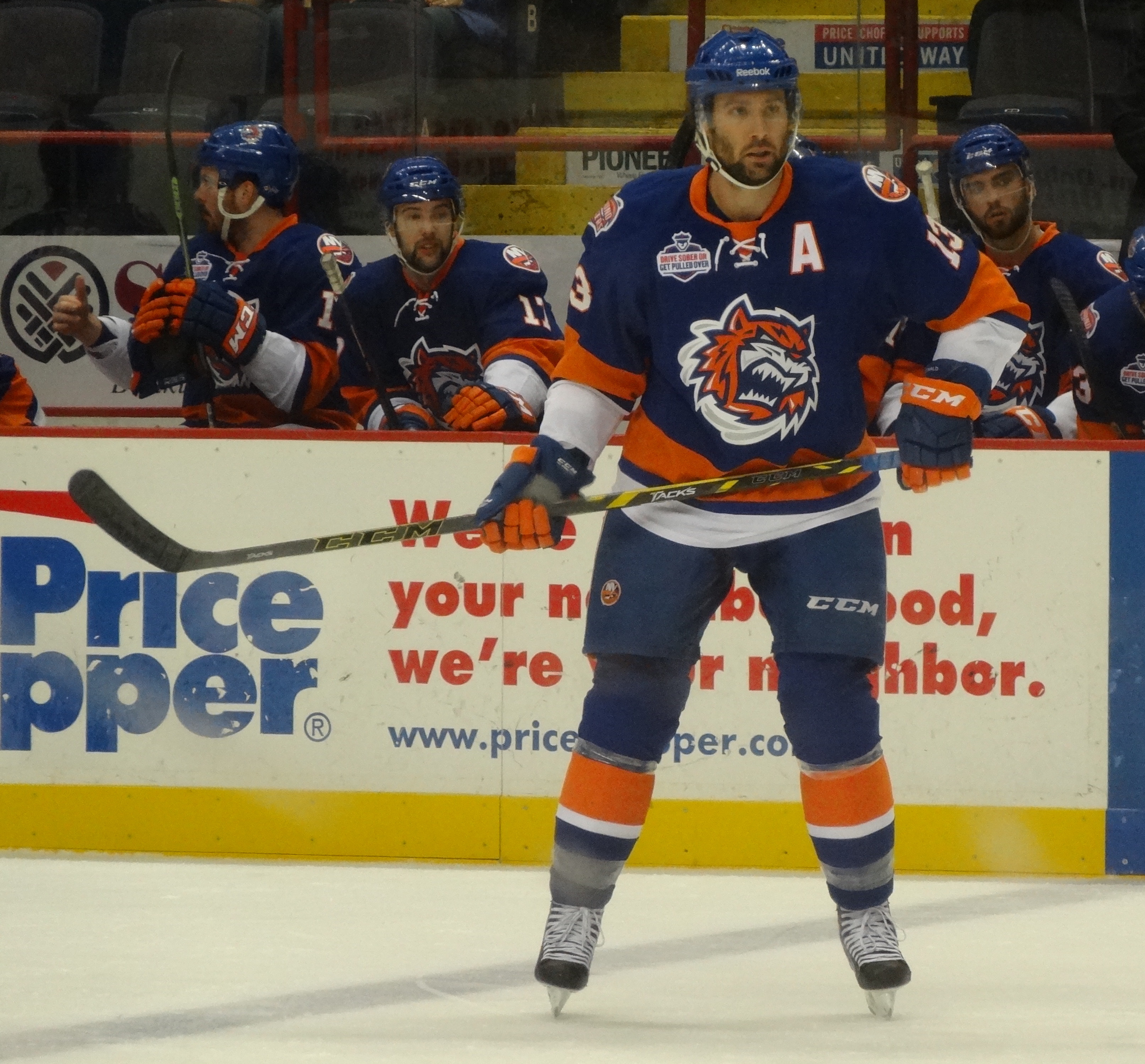
McDonald with the Bridgeport Sound Tigers in 2014.

As a free agent from the Phantoms, McDonald opted to return to the Bridgeport Sound Tigers, signing a one-year AHL contract with the team on August 29, 2019.

On February 28, 2021, McDonald announced his retirement from playing hockey on his Instagram and currently works with Recorded Future in cybersecurity.

== Career statistics ==
=== Regular season and playoffs ===
			Regular season					Playoffs
Season	Team	League	GP	G	A	Pts	PIM	GP	G	A	Pts	PIM
2001–02	New England Jr. Coyotes	EJHL	39	16	20	36	50	—	—	—	—	—
2002–03	New England Jr. Coyotes	EJHL	44	28	40	68	59	—	—	—	—	—
2003–04	Providence College	HE	37	10	6	16	47	—	—	—	—	—
2004–05	Providence College	HE	26	11	5	16	14	—	—	—	—	—
2005–06	Providence College	HE	36	9	19	28	29	—	—	—	—	—
2006–07	Providence College	HE	36	13	4	17	30	—	—	—	—	—
2007–08	Springfield Falcons	AHL	73	12	11	23	46	—	—	—	—	—
2008–09	Springfield Falcons	AHL	77	10	12	22	65	—	—	—	—	—
2008–09	Stockton Thunder	ECHL	3	0	2	2	0	—	—	—	—	—
2009–10	Springfield Falcons	AHL	76	12	11	23	38	—	—	—	—	—
2009–10	Edmonton Oilers	NHL	2	1	0	1	0	—	—	—	—	—
2010–11	Oklahoma City Barons	AHL	80	42	16	58	63	6	1	1	2	6
2011–12	Wilkes–Barre/Scranton Penguins	AHL	66	13	35	48	41	12	6	7	13	2
2011–12	Pittsburgh Penguins	NHL	5	0	0	0	0	—	—	—	—	—
2012–13	Bridgeport Sound Tigers	AHL	35	6	21	27	32	—	—	—	—	—
2012–13	New York Islanders	NHL	45	7	10	17	32	6	2	1	3	2
2013–14	New York Islanders	NHL	70	8	10	18	34	—	—	—	—	—
2014–15	New York Islanders	NHL	18	2	6	8	0	2	0	0	0	2
2014–15	Bridgeport Sound Tigers	AHL	40	14	21	35	28	—	—	—	—	—
2015–16	Lehigh Valley Phantoms	AHL	51	14	18	32	30	—	—	—	—	—
2015–16	Philadelphia Flyers	NHL	5	1	0	1	7	3	0	0	0	0
2016–17	Lehigh Valley Phantoms	AHL	72	25	19	44	27	5	2	1	3	0
2016–17	Philadelphia Flyers	NHL	3	1	0	1	0	—	—	—	—	—
2017–18	Lehigh Valley Phantoms	AHL	56	8	17	25	21	13	1	5	6	4
2018–19	Lehigh Valley Phantoms	AHL	69	13	15	28	14	—	—	—	—	—
2019–20	Bridgeport Sound Tigers	AHL	60	5	15	20	16	—	—	—	—	—
AHL totals			757	175	211	386	421	36	10	14	24	12
NHL totals			148	20	26	46	73	11	2	1	3	4

=== International ===
Year	Team	Event	Result	GP	G	A	Pts	PIM
2014	United States	WC	6th	7	1	0	1	0
Senior totals				7	1	0	1	0

== Awards and honors ==
Award	Year
EJHL
Top Prospects Tournament MVP	2002
Offensive player of the year	2003
MVP	2003
Hockey Night in Boston Player of the Year	2003
College
All-Hockey East Rookie Team	2004
All-Tournament Team	2005
AHL
All-Star Game	2011
All-Star Team	2011
Willie Marshall Award	2011
