= Cal Clutterbuck =

Canadian ice hockey player (born 1987)

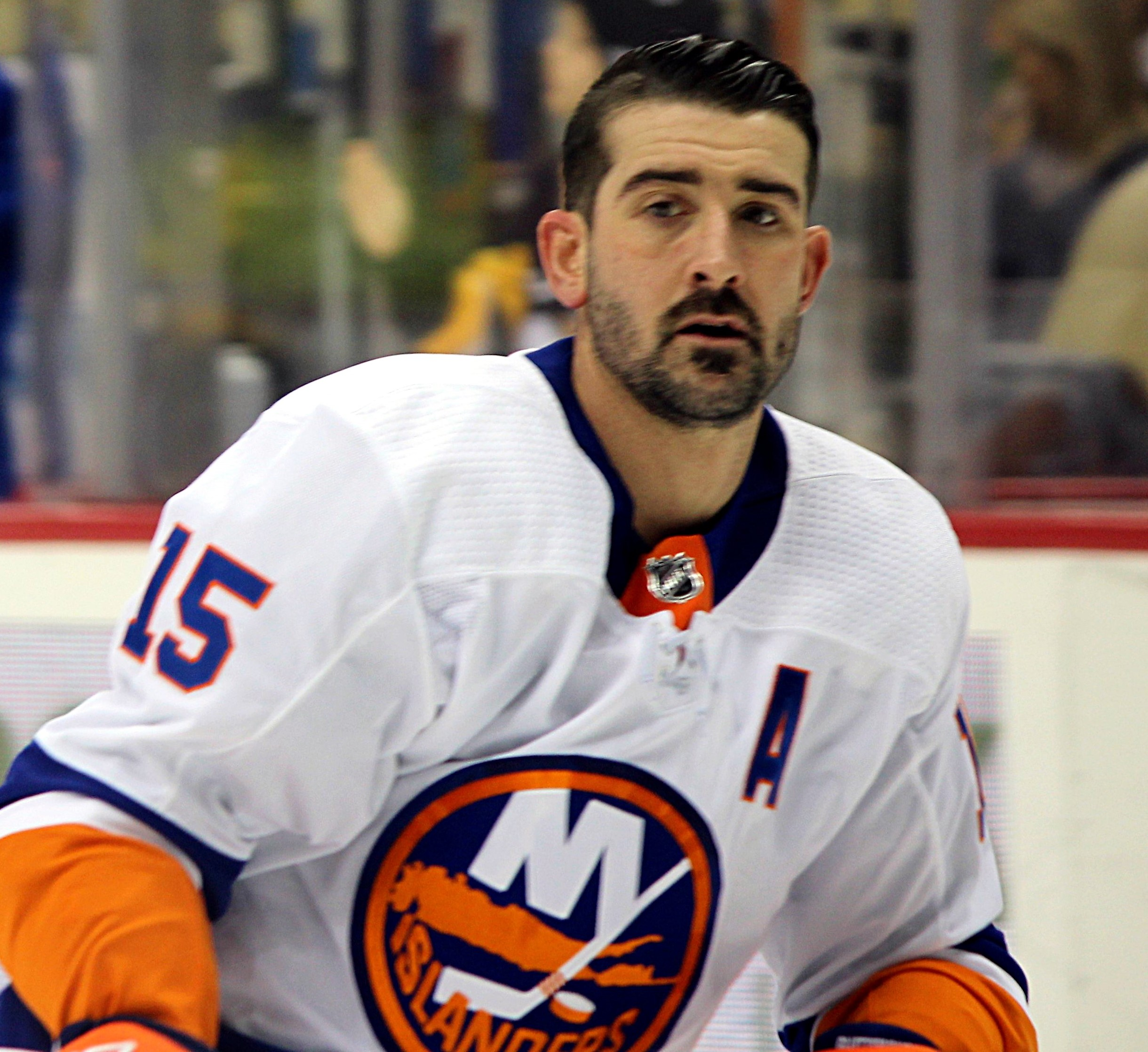
- Clutterbuck with the New York Islanders in March 2018
- Born: November 18, 1987 (age 38) Welland, Ontario, Canada
- Height: 5 ft 11 in (180 cm)
- Weight: 215 lb (98 kg; 15 st 5 lb)
- Position: Right wing
- Shot: Right
- Played for: Minnesota Wild; New York Islanders
- National team: Canada
- NHL draft: 72nd overall, 2006; Minnesota Wild
- Playing career: 2007–2024

Cal William Clutterbuck (born November 18, 1987) is a Canadian former professional ice hockey player. Playing as a right winger, he was drafted 72nd overall by the Minnesota Wild in the 2006 NHL entry draft. He played for the Wild and New York Islanders of the National Hockey League (NHL). Clutterbuck holds the NHL record for most career hits.

== Early life ==
Clutterbuck was born on November 18, 1987, in Welland, Ontario, to Tim and Jocelyne Clutterbuck. He was around the same age as many other future National Hockey League (NHL) players from the Welland area, and is remembered in his hometown as one of the "Welland Five", a group that also consists of Matt Ellis, Daniel Paille, Dan Girardi, and Paul Bissonnette. Bissonnette remembered Clutterbuck as a "dominant scorer" in Welland youth hockey who only became more physical and focused on checking his opponents when he was older. Clutterbuck played a variety of sports, including baseball, golf, and volleyball, but began focusing solely on hockey when he was around the age of 16. While attending Notre Dame College School, Clutterbuck also played junior ice hockey for the Welland Cougars of the Golden Horseshoe Junior Hockey League.

== Playing career ==
=== Junior ===
The Toronto St. Michael's Majors of the Ontario Hockey League (OHL) drafted Clutterbuck in the first round, 13th overall, of the 2003 OHL Priority Selection. He joined the team for the 2003–04 OHL season, scoring his first goal of the year on November 23 in a 5–2 defeat of the Sudbury Wolves.

He was drafted by the Minnesota Wild 72nd overall in the third round of the 2006 NHL entry draft.

=== Professional ===
==== Minnesota Wild ====
Following the conclusion of the 2006–07 season, Clutterbuck signed a three-year, entry-level contract with the Wild on May 31, 2007. Prior to the start of the 2007–08 season, Clutterbuck participated in the 2007 NHL Centre I.C.E. Prospects Tournament. He finished the tournament with two goals and two assists for four points as the Wild prospects fell to the Atlanta Thrashers prospects in the third place game. Upon the conclusion of the tournament, Clutterbuck was cut from the Wild's development camp and reassigned to their American Hockey League (AHL) affiliate, the Houston Aeros, to start the 2007–08 season. As the youngest player on the team, Clutterbuck scored his first professional goal on his first professional shot in his first professional game in the team's home opener against the Chicago Wolves on October 6. Clutterbuck quickly accumulated two goals and an assist to tie for fourth in team scoring before being recalled to the NHL level on October 23. He subsequently made his NHL debut on October 28 against the Colorado Avalanche. He played one more game with the Wild before being reassigned to the Houston Aeros on November 1. By the end of February, Clutterbuck had accumulated 18 points in 50 games with the Aeros. Clutterbuck finished the season with the Aeros, tallying 11 goals and 13 assists through 73 games along with 97 penalty minutes.

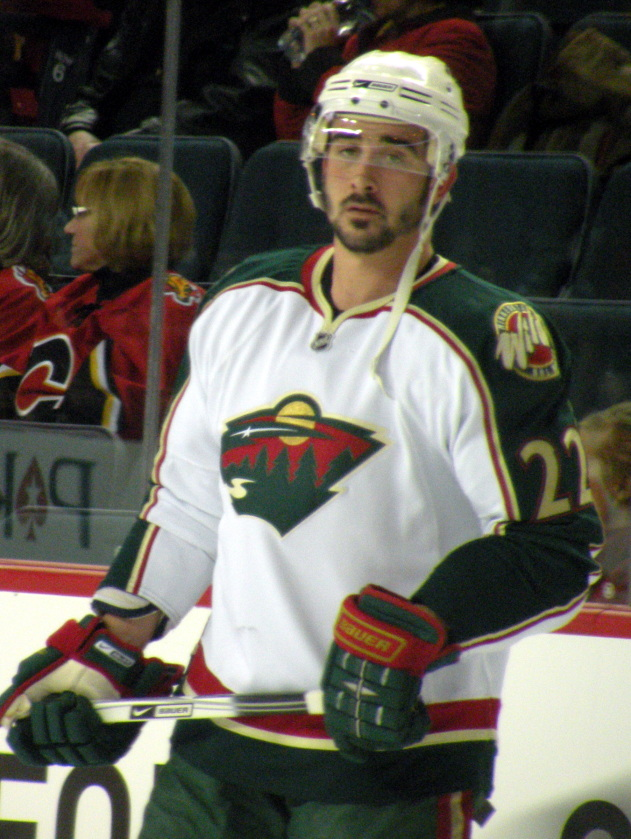
Clutterbuck with the Wild in March 2009.

Prior to the start of the 2008–09 season, Clutterbuck again participated in the NHL's Prospects Tournament, where he again tallied two goals and two assists for four points. Although he was again reassigned to the Aeros to start the 2008–09 season, Clutterbuck was called up to the NHL level on October 15 after Marek Zidlicky was placed on Injured Reserve. Upon rejoining the Wild at the NHL level, Clutterbuck averaged 10:05 of ice time per game while also leading the Northwest Division with 51 hits. On November 24, 2008, Clutterbuck scored his first two NHL goals against José Théodore of the Washington Capitals to lead them to a 4–3 win. After also recording four hits during the game, Clutterbuck continued to lead the team and all rookies across the league with 64 hits. However, after going scoreless in the following two games, Clutterbuck was a healthy scratch twice in a row. Wild coach Jacques Lemaire later stated that this was meant to send a message to Clutterbuck and motivate him. He continued to struggle to score goals and went goalless for nearly a month before breaking the drought on December 23 against the Carolina Hurricanes. After setting a new career-high with nine hits in the Wild's 3–0 win over the Anaheim Ducks on February 4, he continued to lead the NHL in hits with 180 through 45 games. The following month, Clutterbuck recorded an assist and set a new franchise record with 10 hits in their overtime loss to the San Jose Sharks on March 10. By the end of the month, Clutterbuck had set a new league record with 327 hits through 72 games while also tallying eight goals and 13 points. The previous record was 311, set by Dustin Brown of the Los Angeles Kings. He subsequently finished the season with 18 points and an NHL record of 356 hits.

Following his rookie season with the Wild, Clutterbuck worked to remain a mainstay in their lineup by spending the offseason running sprints, lifting weights, and working on his agility. Although he made the Wild's opening night roster for the 2009–10 season, he only played four games with the team before being placed on injured reserve. He subsequently missed five games before returning to the Wild's lineup on October 24 and scoring the game-winning goal in their game against the Hurricanes. He continued to score and tallied four goals over his next 10 games. On February 14, Clutterbuck scored his career-high 12th goal and recorded his first assist in 21 games. Later that month, Clutterbuck became the first Wild player to sign an extension during the 2009–2010 season as he signed a three-year extension on February 25. Despite missing one game due to a lower-body injury, he surpassed his previous seasons' point total by also setting new career-highs in assists on March 21. Clutterbuck finished his second full season in the NHL with a career-high 13 goals and eight assists for 21 points through 74 games.

In his third full season with the Wild, Clutterbuck set new career-highs with 19 goals and 15 assists for 34 points. Through his first four games of the 2010–11 season, Clutterbuck played on the second line with Martin Havlat and Matt Cullen while averaging a career-high 15:33 of ice time. Although he led the team with seven goals through November, he tallied his first assist of the season on November 26. The following month, he recorded his first two-point game since February 14, 2010.

==== New York Islanders ====
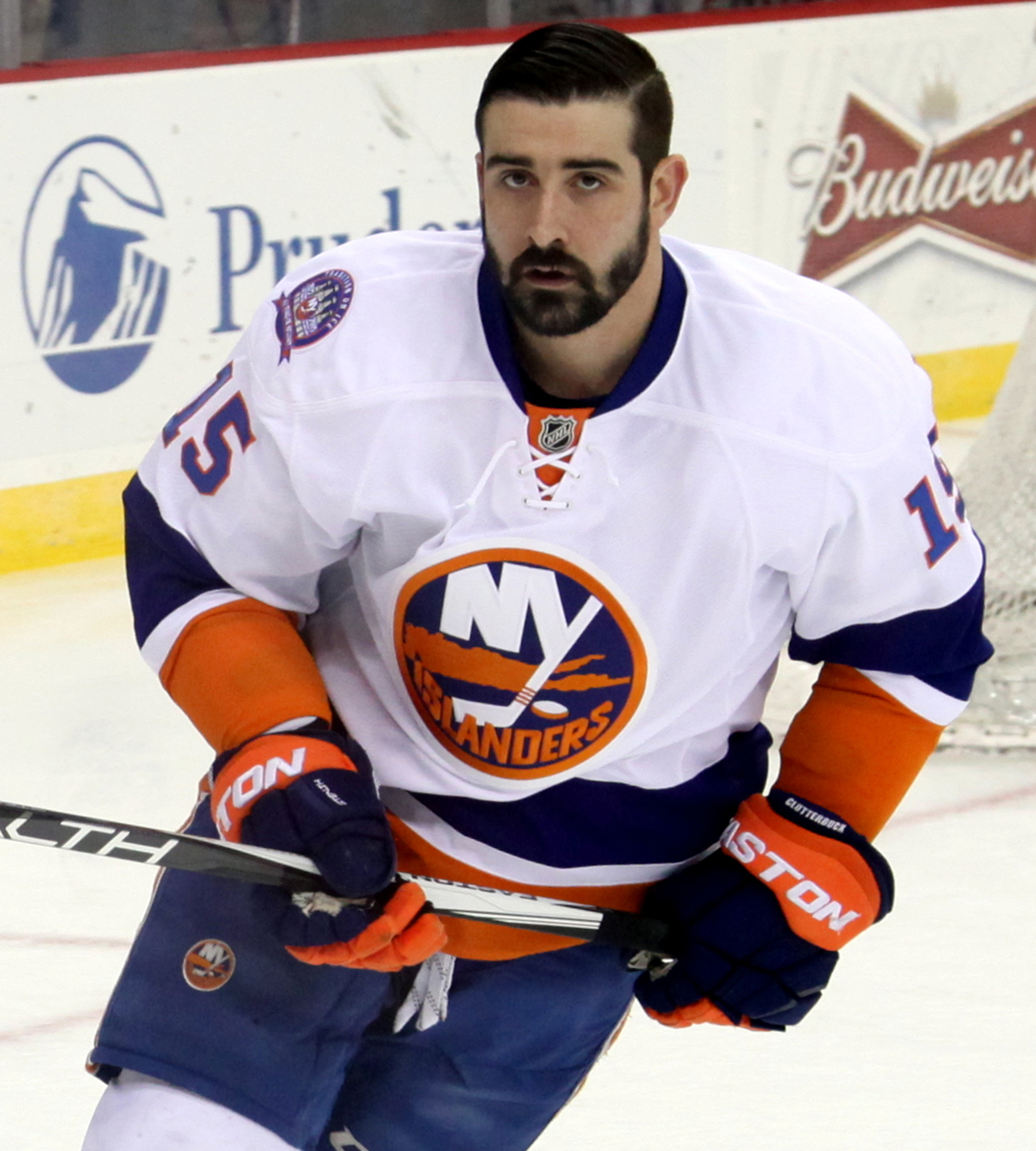
Clutterbuck with the Islanders in March 2015

On June 30, 2013, during the 2013 NHL entry draft, Clutterbuck, a restricted free agent, was traded from the Wild to the Islanders along with a third-round draft pick in exchange for forward Nino Niederreiter.

During the 2014–15 season, Clutterbuck was named as an alternate captain for the team after Kyle Okposo was sidelined with an eye injury.

On April 25, 2015, Clutterbuck scored what would later become the last goal in Nassau Veterans Memorial Coliseum history (until the Islanders announced a part-time return to the Coliseum starting with the 2018–19 season) into an empty net with 0:53 remaining in the third period as the Islanders won game 6 of their first-round playoff series in the 2015 playoffs against the Capitals, 3–1, to stave off elimination extend the series to a seventh game. The Islanders would eventually lose game 7 to the Capitals two nights later.

The following season, Clutterbuck's line, consisting of Casey Cizikas and Matt Martin and himself, was considered to be the best fourth line in the NHL by some analysts. He signed a five-year contract with the Islanders on December 9, 2016.

In the 2021–22 season, while in the final season of his five-year contract, and with the Islanders out of playoff contention, Clutterbuck opted to re-sign to a two-year, $3.5 million contract extension with the team on March 21, 2022 at the NHL trade deadline. Having appeared in 59 regular season games, totalling six goals and 15 points, Clutterbuck was announced to undergo season-ending shoulder surgery on March 24, 2022.

On November 22, 2023, Clutterbuck played his 1,000th NHL game as the Islanders defeated the Philadelphia Flyers 3–2.

After going unsigned through the 2024–25 season, Clutterbuck announced his retirement on April 23, 2025. He finished his career with 1,064 games played between the Wild and Islanders, and retired as the league's all-time hits leader.

== Career statistics ==
=== Regular season and playoffs ===
			Regular season					Playoffs
Season	Team	League	GP	G	A	Pts	PIM	GP	G	A	Pts	PIM
2001–02	Welland Cougars	GHL	6	2	1	3	0	—	—	—	—	—
2002–03	Welland Cougars	GHL	48	24	29	53	26	—	—	—	—	—
2003–04	Toronto St. Michael's Majors	OHL	60	4	7	11	112	18	3	5	8	20
2004–05	Toronto St. Michael's Majors	OHL	38	10	6	16	55	—	—	—	—	—
2004–05	Oshawa Generals	OHL	27	9	9	18	42	—	—	—	—	—
2005–06	Oshawa Generals	OHL	66	35	33	68	139	—	—	—	—	—
2006–07	Oshawa Generals	OHL	65	35	54	89	153	9	8	5	13	21
2007–08	Houston Aeros	AHL	73	11	13	24	97	5	0	0	0	14
2007–08	Minnesota Wild	NHL	2	0	0	0	0	—	—	—	—	—
2008–09	Houston Aeros	AHL	2	0	0	0	0	—	—	—	—	—
2008–09	Minnesota Wild	NHL	78	11	7	18	76	—	—	—	—	—
2009–10	Minnesota Wild	NHL	74	13	8	21	52	—	—	—	—	—
2010–11	Minnesota Wild	NHL	76	19	15	34	79	—	—	—	—	—
2011–12	Minnesota Wild	NHL	74	15	12	27	103	—	—	—	—	—
2012–13	Minnesota Wild	NHL	42	4	6	10	27	5	1	1	2	4
2013–14	New York Islanders	NHL	73	12	7	19	40	—	—	—	—	—
2014–15	New York Islanders	NHL	76	7	9	16	60	7	2	1	3	26
2015–16	New York Islanders	NHL	77	15	8	23	22	11	2	1	3	12
2016–17	New York Islanders	NHL	66	5	15	20	28	—	—	—	—	—
2017–18	New York Islanders	NHL	76	8	10	18	53	—	—	—	—	—
2018–19	New York Islanders	NHL	73	8	15	23	44	7	0	0	0	4
2019–20	New York Islanders	NHL	37	3	4	7	22	21	2	2	4	18
2019–20	Bridgeport Sound Tigers	AHL	2	0	0	0	4	—	—	—	—	—
2020–21	New York Islanders	NHL	50	4	7	11	10	19	4	3	7	10
2021–22	New York Islanders	NHL	59	6	9	15	10	—	—	—	—	—
2022–23	New York Islanders	NHL	49	6	6	12	30	6	1	0	1	16
2023–24	New York Islanders	NHL	82	7	12	19	32	5	0	0	0	10
NHL totals			1,064	143	150	293	698	81	12	8	20	100

=== International ===
Year	Team	Event	Result	GP	G	A	Pts	PIM
2004	Canada Ontario	U17	1st place, gold medalist(s)	6	3	0	3	4
2004	Canada	U18	1st place, gold medalist(s)	5	2	0	2	20
2005	Canada	WJC18	2nd place, silver medalist(s)	6	1	1	2	8
2011	Canada	WC	5th	7	0	1	1	4
Junior totals				17	6	1	7	32
Senior totals				7	0	1	1	4
