= Casey Cizikas =

Canadian ice hockey player (born 1991)

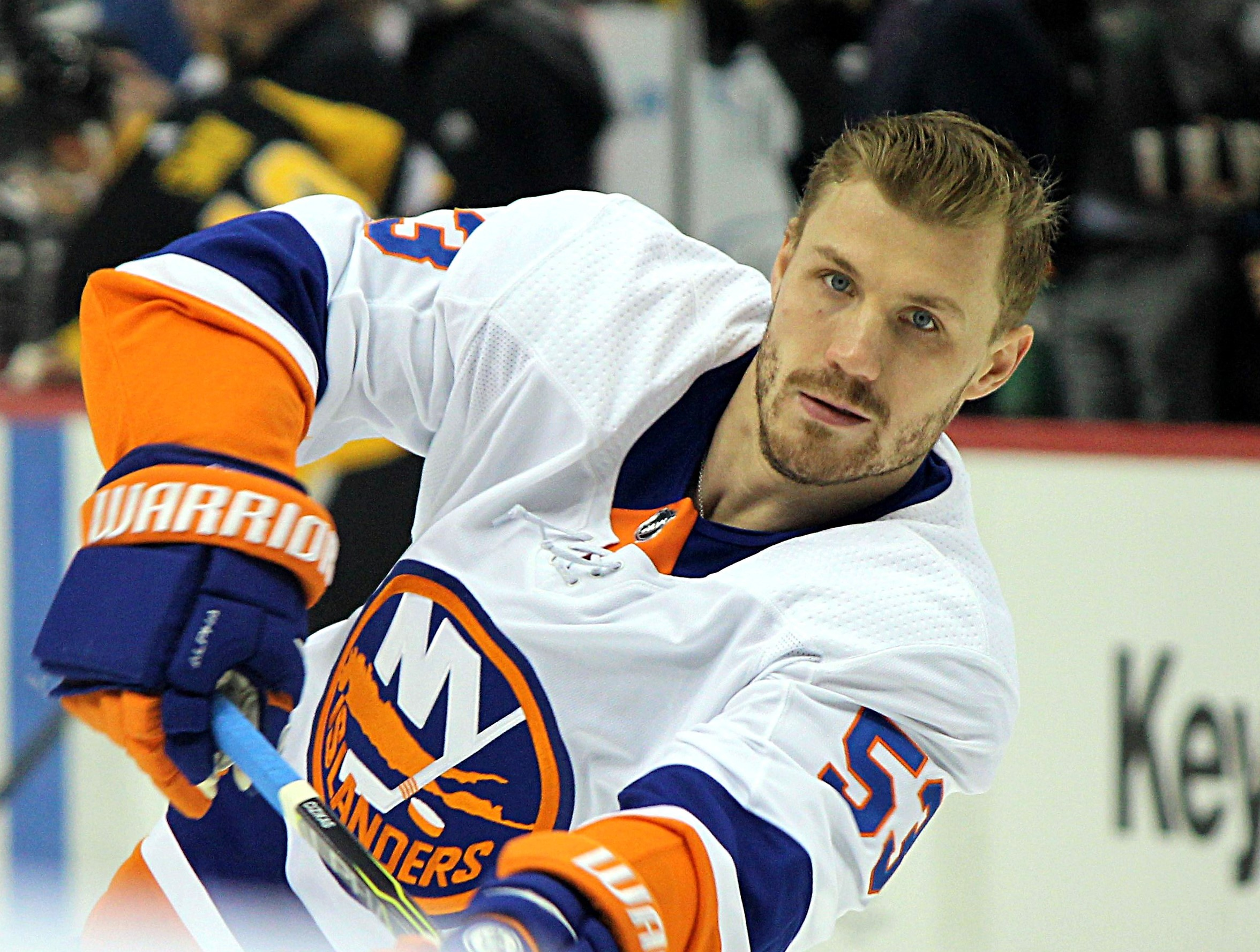
- Cizikas with the New York Islanders in 2018
- Born: February 27, 1991 (age 35) Toronto, Ontario, Canada
- Height: 5 ft 11 in (180 cm)
- Weight: 191 lb (87 kg; 13 st 9 lb)
- Position: Centre
- Shoots: Left
- NHL team: New York Islanders
- NHL draft: 92nd overall, 2009; New York Islanders
- Playing career: 2011–present

Casey Cizikas (born February 27, 1991) is a Canadian professional ice hockey player who is a centre for the New York Islanders of the National Hockey League (NHL). He spent four seasons with the Mississauga St. Michaels Majors of the Ontario Hockey League (OHL), where he had two 20-goal seasons. Cizikas was selected by the Islanders in the fourth round, 92nd overall, of the 2009 NHL entry draft. He began playing for their minor league affiliate, the American Hockey League (AHL)'s Bridgeport Sound Tigers, two years after the draft, during the 2011–12 season; he was recalled to the Islanders' NHL roster mid-season.

== Playing career ==
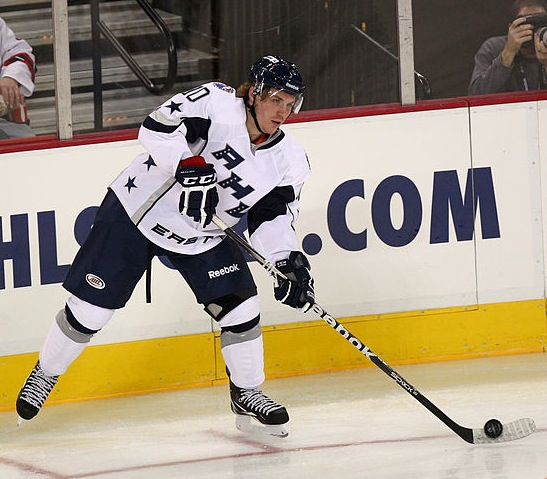
Cizikas in the 2012 AHL All-Star Game, playing for the Eastern Conference All-Stars

The Mississauga St. Michael's Majors selected Cizikas with their first selection, third overall, in the 2007 Ontario Hockey League (OHL) Priority selection draft. He made his OHL debut in the 2007–08 season, finishing tenth in rookie scoring with 41 points in 62 games.

At the 2009 NHL entry draft, Cizikas was selected by the New York Islanders with their fourth round pick, 92nd overall. He returned to the Majors for the 2009–10 season, where he tied for the team lead in scoring with 62 points and led with a plus-minus rating of +32. Cizikas served as their captain in the 2010–11 season, where he recorded 64 points. He added 19 more in the OHL playoffs that year, leading the Majors to the championship series, which they ultimately lost to the Owen Sound Attack in seven games.

Cizikas spent the majority of the 2011–12 season in the American Hockey League (AHL) with the Islanders' minor league affiliate, the Bridgeport Sound Tigers. He scored his first two goals with the team on October 18, 2011, against the Providence Bruins, and was second in team scoring with 45 points by the end of the season. He was recalled by the Islanders during the season, and made his NHL debut on February 24, 2012, against the New York Rangers. He appeared in 15 games with the Islanders that season and recorded four assists. His first two NHL points came on March 1, 2012, against the Philadelphia Flyers. After returning to the Sound Tigers, an upper body injury prevented him from playing in the team's last five games of the regular season, but he returned in time for the playoffs.

As a result of the 2012–13 NHL lockout, Cizikas began the season with the Sound Tigers. He had 21 points in 31 games with Bridgeport before the labour dispute was settled and he was recalled to the Islanders. He then scored his first career NHL goal on January 29, 2013, against goaltender Marc-André Fleury of the Pittsburgh Penguins. Cizikas finished the season with six goals and 15 points in 45 regular season games, then added four points in six Stanley Cup playoff games.

During the 2015–16 campaign, Cizikas' line, consisting of him, Matt Martin, and Cal Clutterbuck was considered to be the best 4th line in the NHL by hockey analysts. Cizikas is commonly considered to be one of the best fourth line players in the NHL. On June 2, 2016, Cizikas signed a new five-year contract with the Islanders. On April 5, 2018, Cizikas was presented with the Islanders' Bob Nystrom Award for 2017–18. On May 24, 2019, Cizikas received his second Bob Nystrom Award.

On September 1, 2021, Cizikas was re-signed to a six-year, $15 million contract by the Islanders. On April 21, 2023, he scored the first playoff goal at UBS Arena.

On November 21, 2026, Cizikas played his 1,000th career NHL game against the Detroit Red Wings, becoming the 4th player in franchise history to play in 1,000 games with the Islanders, and 428th all-time.

== International play ==
Medal record

Representing Canada

Ice hockey

World Junior Championships
Silver medal – second place	2011 USA	

World U17 Hockey Challenge
Gold medal – first place	2008 Canada	

Cizikas made two appearances with the Canadian national junior team program during the 2008–09 season. He was first a member of the Team Ontario squad that won the gold medal in the 2008 World U17 Hockey Challenge during the season, then won gold with the under-18 national team at the 2008 Ivan Hlinka Memorial Tournament following his OHL season.

During the 2011–12 season, Cizikas was a surprise pick for the national junior team at the 2011 World Junior Ice Hockey Championships. He recorded two goals and one assist to help Canada win a silver medal.

== Playing style ==
Cizikas, in his first full season with the Islanders, was described as a player with a lot of energy and intensity whose offensive skills have improved over time. His forecheck has been called relentless and he became known for being willing to create energy by throwing his body around the ice.

== Personal life ==
During a rugby football game in 2007, Cizikas tackled Manny Castillo in what was described as a "sucker tackle" and a "pile-driver". Peel Regional Police supported a Cizikas' conviction, as the tackle led to a death.

In 2009, Cizikas was found guilty of manslaughter by Judge Bruce Duncan, who believed Cizikas used "unnecessary force." He was given a sentence of one year probation and 100 hours of community service.

== Career statistics ==
=== Regular season and playoffs ===
			Regular season					Playoffs
Season	Team	League	GP	G	A	Pts	PIM	GP	G	A	Pts	PIM
2007–08	Mississauga St. Michael's Majors	OHL	62	18	23	41	41	4	1	2	3	6
2008–09	Mississauga St. Michael's Majors	OHL	55	16	20	36	39	11	5	4	9	11
2009–10	Mississauga St. Michael's Majors	OHL	68	25	37	62	77	16	7	7	14	16
2010–11	Mississauga St. Michael's Majors	OHL	52	29	34	64	40	16	5	14	19	14
2011–12	Bridgeport Sound Tigers	AHL	52	15	30	45	30	3	0	0	0	20
2011–12	New York Islanders	NHL	15	0	4	4	6	—	—	—	—	—
2012–13	Bridgeport Sound Tigers	AHL	31	10	11	21	35	—	—	—	—	—
2012–13	New York Islanders	NHL	45	6	9	15	14	6	2	2	4	12
2013–14	New York Islanders	NHL	80	6	10	16	30	—	—	—	—	—
2014–15	New York Islanders	NHL	70	9	9	18	24	7	1	0	1	0
2015–16	New York Islanders	NHL	80	8	21	29	31	11	0	3	3	16
2016–17	New York Islanders	NHL	59	8	17	25	30	—	—	—	—	—
2017–18	New York Islanders	NHL	64	7	10	17	23	—	—	—	—	—
2018–19	New York Islanders	NHL	73	20	13	33	36	8	0	0	0	6
2019–20	New York Islanders	NHL	48	10	4	14	41	18	0	2	2	8
2020–21	New York Islanders	NHL	56	7	7	14	27	19	2	3	5	2
2021–22	New York Islanders	NHL	74	10	6	16	48	—	—	—	—	—
2022–23	New York Islanders	NHL	81	6	15	21	54	6	1	2	3	16
2023–24	New York Islanders	NHL	70	10	13	23	22	5	1	1	2	14
2024–25	New York Islanders	NHL	82	7	10	17	51	—	—	—	—	—
2025–26	New York Islanders	NHL	81	10	8	18	20	—	—	—	—	—
NHL totals			978	124	156	280	457	80	7	13	20	74

=== International ===
Year	Team	Event	Result	GP	G	A	Pts	PIM
2008	Canada Ontario	U17	1st place, gold medalist(s)	6	4	5	9	0
2011	Canada	WJC	2nd place, silver medalist(s)	7	2	1	3	6
Junior totals				13	6	6	12	6
