= Matt Martin (ice hockey, born 1989) =

Canadian ice hockey player (born 1989)

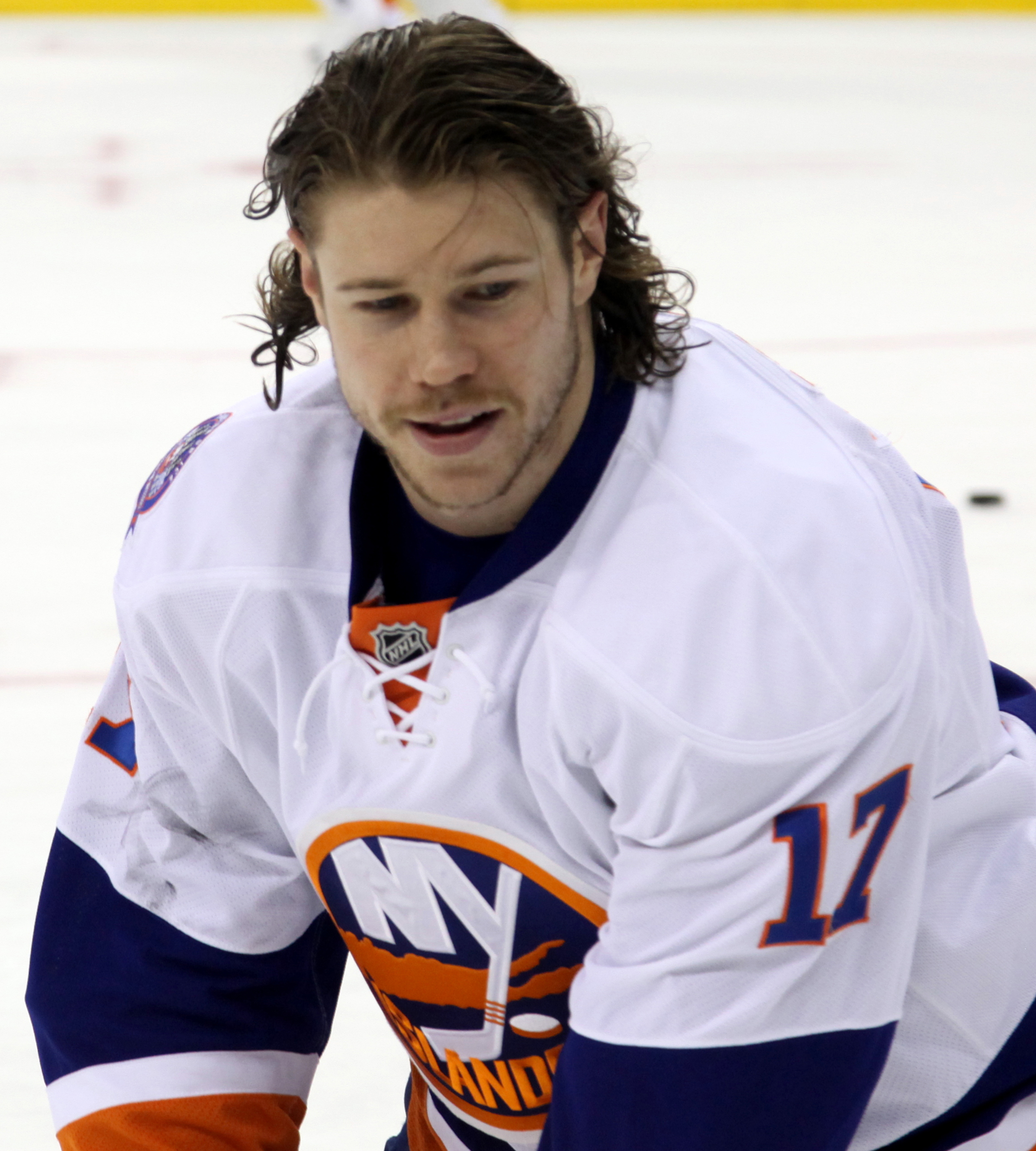
- Martin with the New York Islanders in 2015
- Born: May 8, 1989 (age 37) Windsor, Ontario, Canada
- Height: 6 ft 3 in (191 cm)
- Weight: 215 lb (98 kg; 15 st 5 lb)
- Position: Left wing
- Shot: Left
- Played for: New York Islanders; Toronto Maple Leafs
- NHL draft: 148th overall, 2008; New York Islanders
- Playing career: 2009–2025

Matthew Bryan Martin (born May 8, 1989) is a Canadian former professional ice hockey winger who played for the New York Islanders and Toronto Maple Leafs of the National Hockey League (NHL). Known for his strong checking abilities, Martin previously held the NHL record for most hits in a season, losing the record to Jérémy Lauzon in 2024. In the NHL, Martin has been described as both an enforcer and a grinder.

== Playing career ==
=== Amateur ===
Martin tried out for his local AAA team, the Windsor Jr. Spitfires, but was cut and played AA hockey for the Lasalle Sabres. In 2005–06, he joined the Blenheim Blades Jr. C club as a free agent. In 2006, he tried out with the Sarnia Sting of the Ontario Hockey League as a walk-on, and made the team, playing on a line with Steven Stamkos. He would eventually serve as the captain of the Sarnia Sting.

=== Professional ===
Martin was drafted in the fifth round, 148th overall by the New York Islanders in the 2008 NHL entry draft. Martin was signed by the Islanders to a three-year entry-level contract on September 4, 2009. Martin scored his first NHL goal on October 29, 2010 against Alex Auld of the Montreal Canadiens.

On September 15, 2012, Martin agreed to a four-year contract with the Islanders.

During the 2014–15 NHL season, Martin set the NHL record for most hits in a single season, recording 382 checks.

The following season, during the 2015–16 campaign, Martin's line, consisting of himself, Casey Cizikas, and Cal Clutterbuck was considered to be one of the best fourth lines in the NHL by ice hockey analysts.

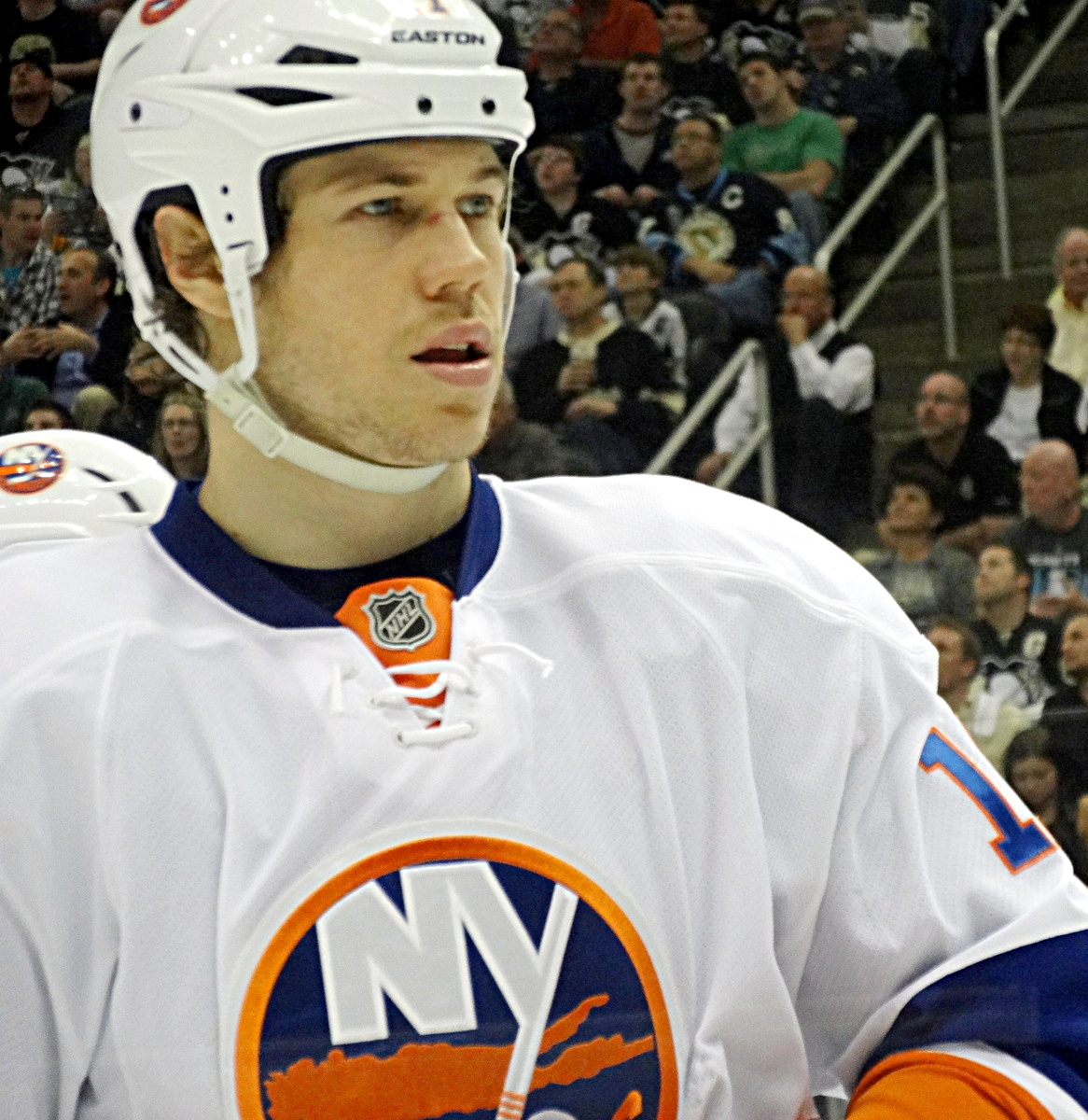
Martin with the New York Islanders during the 2013 playoffs.

On July 1, 2016, as an unrestricted free agent for the first time in his career, Martin and the Toronto Maple Leafs agreed to a four-year, $10 million contract, worth an average of $2.5 million a season. In his first season with Toronto, Martin assumed his role as an enforcer, playing on the fourth line for the team and protecting the plethora of rookies on the roster from hits by other players, and fighting those that ran teammates. The team would qualify for the post-season, with Martin picking up two points in the second game of the series which would see the Maple Leafs lose in six contests to the top seeded Washington Capitals.

During the 2017–18 season, Martin's playing numbers diminished, and during a stretch in January and February, he was a healthy scratch for 18 consecutive games. He ended the regular season with 12 points in 50 games. On April 23, 2018, Martin was nominated for the King Clancy Memorial Trophy, as a player who best exemplifies leadership qualities and made humanitarian contributions to the community.

On July 3, 2018, after two seasons with the Maple Leafs, Martin was traded back to the New York Islanders by Toronto in exchange for Eamon McAdam.

During his first season back with the Islanders, Martin was placed on injured reserve on November 15 due to an upper-body injury that occurred on November 1. At the time, he had scored three goals in 11 games with the Islanders, matching his total from Toronto last season. He was activated off injured reserve on November 26.

On January 11, 2021, Martin was signed to a four-year, $6 million extension with the Islanders.

At the conclusion of his four-year contract, Martin was an unsigned free agent leading into the 2024–25 season. On October 26, 2024, he continued his tenure with the New York Islanders by agreeing to a one-year contract. He featured in 32 regular season games, adding 2 assists in a depth forward role. On June 24, 2025, Martin announced his retirement from the NHL and joined the New York Islanders front office, becoming a special assistant to general manager Mathieu Darche.

== Personal life ==
Martin is married to Sydney Esiason, the daughter of former NFL player Boomer Esiason. The couple has two daughters and two sons.

Martin has an older brother who also played hockey and encouraged him to get involved in the sport.

In the summer of 2015, Martin started the Matt Martin Foundation to raise money for causes such as NYPD Widows and Children’s Fund, the Association for Children with Down Syndrome, the Boomer Esiason Foundation for Cystic Fibrosis and the Islanders Children’s Foundation. In 2016, Martin was named a finalist for the NHL Foundation Player Award due to his involvement in the community and charity work.

New York Islanders rookie Matthew Schaefer lived with Martin and his family during his first NHL season, in 2025-2026, and has said that he will likely be there for several more seasons in the future.

== Career statistics ==
			Regular season					Playoffs
Season	Team	League	GP	G	A	Pts	PIM	GP	G	A	Pts	PIM
2004–05	Lasalle Vipers AA	U16 AA	—	—	—	—	—	—	—	—	—	—
2005–06	Blenheim Blades	GLJHL	40	11	12	23	102	—	—	—	—	—
2006–07	Sarnia Blast	WOHL	9	2	5	7	16	—	—	—	—	—
2006–07	Sarnia Sting	OHL	39	3	3	6	52	4	0	0	0	0
2007–08	Sarnia Sting	OHL	66	25	13	38	155	9	3	3	6	16
2008–09	Sarnia Sting	OHL	61	35	30	65	142	5	3	0	3	10
2009–10	Bridgeport Sound Tigers	AHL	76	12	19	31	113	5	1	2	3	4
2009–10	New York Islanders	NHL	5	0	2	2	26	—	—	—	—	—
2010–11	Bridgeport Sound Tigers	AHL	7	1	2	3	11	—	—	—	—	—
2010–11	New York Islanders	NHL	68	5	9	14	147	—	—	—	—	—
2011–12	New York Islanders	NHL	80	7	7	14	121	—	—	—	—	—
2012–13	New York Islanders	NHL	48	4	7	11	63	6	1	0	1	14
2013–14	New York Islanders	NHL	79	8	6	14	90	—	—	—	—	—
2014–15	New York Islanders	NHL	78	8	6	14	114	7	0	1	1	12
2015–16	New York Islanders	NHL	80	10	9	19	119	11	0	0	0	12
2016–17	Toronto Maple Leafs	NHL	82	5	4	9	123	6	0	2	2	6
2017–18	Toronto Maple Leafs	NHL	50	3	9	12	50	—	—	—	—	—
2018–19	New York Islanders	NHL	67	6	8	14	53	8	0	0	0	0
2019–20	New York Islanders	NHL	55	5	3	8	40	22	5	1	6	28
2020–21	New York Islanders	NHL	54	6	5	11	36	19	1	1	2	43
2021–22	New York Islanders	NHL	71	3	4	7	70	—	—	—	—	—
2022–23	New York Islanders	NHL	81	7	12	19	63	6	1	0	1	16
2023–24	New York Islanders	NHL	57	4	4	8	43	3	0	0	0	16
2024–25	New York Islanders	NHL	32	0	2	2	10	—	—	—	—	—
NHL totals			987	81	97	178	1,168	88	8	5	13	147
