= 2014–15 Carolina Hurricanes season =

National Hockey League team season

2014–15 Carolina Hurricanes
- Division: 8th Metropolitan
- Conference: 14th Eastern
- 2014–15 record: 30–41–11
- Home record: 18–16–7
- Road record: 12–25–4
- Goals for: 188
- Goals against: 226

Team information
- General manager: Ron Francis
- Coach: Bill Peters
- Captain: Eric Staal
- Alternate captains: Ron Hainsey (Oct.–Jan.); Jay Harrison (Oct.–Dec.); Andrej Sekera (Oct.–Feb.); Jordan Staal
- Arena: PNC Arena
- Average attendance: 12,594 (41 games)

Team leaders
- Goals: Eric Staal (23)
- Assists: Justin Faulk (34)
- Points: Eric Staal (54)
- Penalty minutes: Brad Malone (74)
- Plus/minus: Andrej Nestrasil (+2)
- Wins: Cam Ward (22)
- Goals against average: Cam Ward (2.40)

The 2014–15 Carolina Hurricanes season was the 43rd season for the major league ice hockey team; its 36th season in the National Hockey League since the NHL franchise was granted on June 22, 1979, and 17th season since the franchise relocated from Hartford to start the 1997–98 NHL season. The Hurricanes failed to make the playoffs for the sixth consecutive year.

== Off-season ==
On May 5, 2014, the Hurricanes announced that head coach Kirk Muller, as well as assistant coaches John MacLean and Dave Lewis, were fired. The Hurricanes hired Bill Peters as their new head coach on June 19, 2014.

== Standings ==
Metropolitan Division
Pos	Team	GP	W	L	OTL	ROW	GF	GA	GD	Pts
1	p – New York Rangers	82	53	22	7	49	252	192	+60	113
2	x – Washington Capitals	82	45	26	11	40	242	203	+39	101
3	x – New York Islanders	82	47	28	7	40	252	230	+22	101
4	x – Pittsburgh Penguins	82	43	27	12	39	221	210	+11	98
5	Columbus Blue Jackets	82	42	35	5	33	236	250	−14	89
6	Philadelphia Flyers	82	33	31	18	30	215	234	−19	84
7	New Jersey Devils	82	32	36	14	27	181	216	−35	78
8	Carolina Hurricanes	82	30	41	11	25	188	226	−38	71

Source: National Hockey League
p – Clinched Presidents' Trophy; x – Clinched playoff spot

Eastern Conference Wild Card
Pos	Div	Team	GP	W	L	OTL	ROW	GF	GA	GD	Pts
1	AT	x – Ottawa Senators	82	43	26	13	37	238	215	+23	99
2	ME	x – Pittsburgh Penguins	82	43	27	12	39	221	210	+11	98
3	AT	Boston Bruins	82	41	27	14	37	213	211	+2	96
4	AT	Florida Panthers	82	38	29	15	30	206	223	−17	91
5	ME	Columbus Blue Jackets	82	42	35	5	33	236	250	−14	89
6	ME	Philadelphia Flyers	82	33	31	18	30	215	234	−19	84
7	ME	New Jersey Devils	82	32	36	14	27	181	216	−35	78
8	ME	Carolina Hurricanes	82	30	41	11	25	188	226	−38	71
9	AT	Toronto Maple Leafs	82	30	44	8	25	211	262	−51	68
10	AT	Buffalo Sabres	82	23	51	8	15	161	274	−113	54

Source: National Hockey League
x – Clinched playoff spot

== Schedule and results ==
=== Pre-season ===
2014 preseason game log: 2–5–0 (Home: 1–1–0; Road: 1–4–0)
#	Date	Visitor	Score	Home	OT	Decision	Attendance	Record	Recap
1	September 21	Columbus	4–3	Carolina		Nedeljkovic	6,250	0–1–0	Recap
2	September 23	Carolina	0–2	Buffalo		MacIntyre	18,546	0–2–0	Recap
3	September 24	Carolina	4–2	NY Islanders		MacIntyre	9,888	1–2–0	Recap
4	September 30	Carolina	1–3	St. Louis		Ward	10,213	1–3–0	Recap
5	October 1	Carolina	3–6	Columbus		Khudobin	11,798	1–4–0	Recap
6	October 3	Buffalo	1–5	Carolina		Ward	7,890	2–4–0	Recap
7	October 5	Carolina	2–5	Washington		Khudobin	16,138	2–5–0	Recap

=== Regular season ===
2014–15 Game Log

October: 0–6–2 (Home: 0–1–1; Road: 0–5–1)
#	Date	Visitor	Score	Home	OT	Decision	Attendance	Record	Pts	Recap
1	October 10	NY Islanders	5–3	Carolina		Ward	18,680	0–1–0	0	Recap
2	October 11	Carolina	3–4	NY Islanders		Khudobin	16,170	0–2–0	0	Recap
3	October 14	Buffalo	4–3	Carolina	SO	Ward	14,930	0–2–1	1	Recap
4	October 16	Carolina	1–2	NY Rangers	SO	Khudobin	18,006	0–2–2	2	Recap
5	October 21	Carolina	1–3	Winnipeg		Khudobin	15,016	0–3–2	2	Recap
6	October 23	Carolina	0–5	Calgary		Ward	19,289	0–4–2	2	Recap
7	October 24	Carolina	3–6	Edmonton		Khudobin	16,839	0–5–2	2	Recap
8	October 28	Carolina	1–4	Vancouver		Ward	18,234	0–6–2	2	Recap

November: 7–7–1 (Home: 4–3–0; Road: 3–4–1)
#	Date	Visitor	Score	Home	OT	Decision	Attendance	Record	Pts	Recap
9	November 1	Arizona	0–3	Carolina		Ward	10,870	1–6–2	4	Recap
10	November 2	Los Angeles	2–3	Carolina		Ward	10,519	2–6–2	6	Recap
11	November 4	Carolina	4–2	Columbus		Ward	15,638	3–6–2	8	Recap
12	November 7	Columbus	2–3	Carolina	OT	Ward	11,540	4–6–2	10	Recap
13	November 8	Carolina	3–4	Washington	OT	Khudobin	18,506	4–6–3	11	Recap
14	November 10	Calgary	1–4	Carolina		Ward	9,906	5–6–3	13	Recap
15	November 13	Winnipeg	3–1	Carolina		Ward	10,005	5–7–3	13	Recap
16	November 15	Carolina	1–2	Boston		Ward	17,565	5–8–3	13	Recap
17	November 16	San Jose	2–0	Carolina		Khudobin	12,784	5–9–3	13	Recap
18	November 18	Carolina	6–4	Dallas		Ward	15,678	6–9–3	15	Recap
19	November 20	Carolina	2–3	Los Angeles		Ward	18,230	6–10–3	15	Recap
20	November 22	Carolina	3–4	Colorado		Ward	17,208	6–11–3	15	Recap
21	November 26	Carolina	0–1	Florida		Ward	8,119	6–12–3	15	Recap
22	November 28	Carolina	4–2	Pittsburgh		Ward	18,665	7–12–3	17	Recap
23	November 29	Pittsburgh	3–2	Carolina		Khudobin	11,225	7–13–3	17	Recap

December: 3–10–1 (Home: 2–4–1; Road: 1–6–0)
#	Date	Visitor	Score	Home	OT	Decision	Attendance	Record	Pts	Recap
24	December 2	Nashville	1–2	Carolina		Ward	9,161	8–13–3	19	Recap
25	December 4	Washington	2–1	Carolina		Khudobin	10,783	8–14–3	19	Recap
26	December 7	Detroit	3–1	Carolina		Ward	13,489	8–15–3	19	Recap
27	December 8	New Jersey	2–1	Carolina		Ward	9,815	8–16–3	19	Recap
28	December 11	Carolina	1–2	Tampa Bay		Ward	18,104	8–17–3	19	Recap
29	December 13	Carolina	1–5	Philadelphia		Khudobin	19,609	8–18–3	19	Recap
30	December 16	Carolina	1–4	Montreal		Ward	21,286	8–19–3	19	Recap
31	December 18	Toronto	1–4	Carolina		Ward	12,332	9–19–3	21	Recap
32	December 20	NY Rangers	3–2	Carolina	SO	Ward	13,329	9–19–4	22	Recap
33	December 21	Carolina	0–1	NY Rangers		Khudobin	18,006	9–20–4	22	Recap
34	December 23	Carolina	2–1	New Jersey	SO	Khudobin	16,101	10–20–4	24	Recap
35	December 27	Carolina	1–2	Tampa Bay		Ward	19,204	10–21–4	24	Recap
36	December 29	Montreal	3–1	Carolina		Ward	17,123	10–22–4	24	Recap
37	December 31	Carolina	1–2	Pittsburgh		Ward	18,639	10–23–4	24	Recap

January: 7–3–2 (Home: 5–1–1; Road: 2–2–1)
#	Date	Visitor	Score	Home	OT	Decision	Attendance	Record	Pts	Recap
38	January 2	Philadelphia	1–2	Carolina		Ward	12,682	11–23–4	26	Recap
39	January 4	Boston	1–2	Carolina	SO	Khudobin	17,212	12–23–4	28	Recap
40	January 6	Carolina	2–3	Nashville		Ward	15,706	12–24–4	28	Recap
41	January 8	Buffalo	2–5	Carolina		Ward	9,781	13–24–4	30	Recap
42	January 10	Carolina	4–5	St. Louis	SO	Ward	19,411	13–24–5	31	Recap
43	January 13	Colorado	2–3	Carolina	SO	Khudobin	12,965	14–24–5	33	Recap
44	January 16	Vancouver	3–0	Carolina		Ward	13,093	14–25–5	33	Recap
45	January 17	Carolina	3–2	Ottawa		Khudobin	17,434	15–25–5	35	Recap
46	January 19	Carolina	4–1	Toronto		Khudobin	18,979	16–25–5	37	Recap
47	January 27	Tampa Bay	2–4	Carolina		Khudobin	12,508	17–25–5	39	Recap
48	January 30	St. Louis	3–2	Carolina	SO	Ward	13,287	17–25–6	40	Recap
49	January 31	Carolina	1–4	NY Rangers		Ward	18,006	17–26–6	40	Recap

February: 7–4–1 (Home: 3–2–0; Road: 4–2–1)
#	Date	Visitor	Score	Home	OT	Decision	Attendance	Record	Pts	Recap
50	February 3	Carolina	4–5	Anaheim	OT	Khudobin	16,274	17–26–7	41	Recap
51	February 5	Carolina	2–1	Arizona	SO	Ward	12,649	18–26–7	43	Recap
52	February 7	Carolina	5–4	San Jose		Ward	17,139	19–26–7	45	Recap
53	February 12	Anaheim	2–1	Carolina		Ward	11,991	19–27–7	45	Recap
54	February 14	Carolina	3–6	Minnesota		Khudobin	19,220	19–28–7	45	Recap
55	February 16	Carolina	6–3	Ottawa		Ward	16,562	20–28–7	47	Recap
56	February 17	NY Islanders	4–1	Carolina		Khudobin	11,991	20–29–7	47	Recap
57	February 20	Toronto	1–2	Carolina		Ward	11,991	21–29–7	49	Recap
58	February 21	Carolina	1–3	New Jersey		Khudobin	16,101	21–30–7	49	Recap
59	February 24	Philadelphia	1–4	Carolina		Ward	11,024	22–30–7	51	Recap
60	February 27	Washington	0–3	Carolina		Khudobin	11,024	23–30–7	53	Recap
61	February 28	Carolina	5–3	NY Islanders		Ward	16,170	24–30–7	55	Recap

March: 4–7–4 (Home: 3–4–4; Road: 1–3–0)
#	Date	Visitor	Score	Home	OT	Decision	Attendance	Record	Pts	Recap
62	March 2	Carolina	2–5	Chicago		Ward	11,024	24–31–7	55	Recap
63	March 6	Minnesota	3–1	Carolina		Khudobin	10,857	24–32–7	55	Recap
64	March 8	Edmonton	4–7	Carolina		Ward	12,826	25–32–7	57	Recap
65	March 10	Columbus	4–3	Carolina	SO	Ward	10,418	25–32–8	58	Recap
66	March 12	Dallas	5–3	Carolina		Khudobin	10,025	25–33–8	58	Recap
67	March 14	Florida	2–0	Carolina		Ward	11,790	25–34–8	58	Recap
68	March 15	Carolina	3–2	Columbus		Khudobin	15,258	26–34–8	60	Recap
69	March 17	Ottawa	2–1	Carolina	OT	Khudobin	13,469	26–34–9	61	Recap
70	March 19	Carolina	0–4	Montreal		Khudobin	21,286	26–35–9	61	Recap
71	March 21	NY Rangers	3–2	Carolina	SO	Khudobin	13,404	26–35–10	62	Recap
72	March 23	Chicago	3–1	Carolina		Khudobin	13,786	26–36–10	62	Recap
73	March 26	Pittsburgh	2–5	Carolina		Ward	13,738	27–36–10	64	Recap
74	March 28	New Jersey	1–3	Carolina		Ward	12,578	28–36–10	66	Recap
75	March 29	Boston	2–1	Carolina	OT	Khudobin	14,275	28–36–11	67	Recap
76	March 31	Carolina	2–4	Washington		Ward	18,506	28–37–11	67	Recap

April: 2–4–0 (Home: 1–1–0; Road: 1–3–0)
#	Date	Visitor	Score	Home	OT	Decision	Attendance	Record	Pts	Recap
77	April 2	Carolina	1–6	Florida		Khudobin	9,827	28–38–11	67	Recap
78	April 4	Philadelphia	2–3	Carolina	SO	Ward	12,852	29–38–11	69	Recap
79	April 6	Carolina	3–4	Buffalo		Ward	19,070	29–39–11	69	Recap
80	April 7	Carolina	2–3	Detroit		Khudobin	20,027	29–40–11	69	Recap
81	April 9	Carolina	3–1	Philadelphia		Ward	17,348	30–40–11	71	Recap
82	April 11	Detroit	2–0	Carolina		Ward	16,680	30–41–11	71	Recap

Legend: Win (2 points) Loss (0 points) Overtime/shootout loss (1 point)

== Player stats ==
Final

Skaters

Regular season
Player	GP	G	A	Pts	+/−	PIM
Eric Staal	77	23	21	54	−13	41
Justin Faulk	82	15	34	49	−19	30
Elias Lindholm	81	17	22	39	−23	14
Victor Rask	80	11	22	33	−14	16
Jeff Skinner	77	18	13	31	−24	18
Nathan Gerbe	78	10	18	28	−14	34
Riley Nash	68	8	17	25	−10	12
Jordan Staal	46	6	18	24	−6	14
Jiri Tlusty^{‡}	52	13	10	23	−17	16
John-Michael Liles	57	2	20	22	−9	14
Jay McClement	82	7	14	21	−7	17
Chris Terry	57	11	9	20	−4	14
Alexander Semin	57	6	13	19	−10	32
Andrej Sekera^{‡}	57	2	17	19	−7	8
Andrej Nestrasil^{†}	41	7	11	18	2	4
Brad Malone	65	7	8	15	−8	74
Ryan Murphy	37	4	9	13	−11	8
Patrick Dwyer	71	5	7	12	−12	10
Ron Hainsey	81	2	8	10	−14	16
Brett Bellemore	49	2	8	10	1	27
Tim Gleason^{‡}	55	1	6	7	−18	44
Zach Boychuk	31	3	3	6	0	4
Michal Jordan	38	2	4	6	−7	4
Jay Harrison^{‡}	20	1	3	4	−5	42
Danny Biega	10	0	2	2	−5	0
Jack Hillen^{†}	3	0	0	0	−2	0
Rasmus Rissanen	6	0	0	0	−5	4
Justin Shugg	3	0	0	0	0	2
Brody Sutter	4	0	0	0	−2	0
Keegan Lowe	2	0	0	0	−2	10
Brendan Woods	2	0	0	0	−1	0
Patrick Brown	7	0	0	0	−4	4

Goaltenders

Regular season
Player	GP	GS	TOI	W	L	OT	GA	GAA	SA	SV%	SO	G	A	PIM
Cam Ward	51	50	3026	22	24	5	121	2.40	1351	0.910	1	0	0	4
Anton Khudobin	34	32	1920	8	17	6	87	2.72	874	0.900	1	0	0	0

^{†}Denotes player spent time with another team before joining the Hurricanes. Stats reflect time with the Hurricanes only.
^{‡}Denotes player was traded mid-season. Stats reflect time with the Hurricanes only.
Bold/italics denotes franchise record.

== Notable achievements ==
=== Awards ===
Regular season
Player	Award	Awarded
J. Faulk	NHL All-Star game selection	January 10, 2015

=== Milestones ===
Regular season
Player	Milestone	Reached
V. Rask	1st Career NHL Game	October 10, 2014
P. Brown	1st Career NHL Game	October 10, 2014
V. Rask	1st Career NHL Goal; 1st Career NHL Point	November 2, 2014
V. Rask	1st Career NHL Assist	November 7, 2014
J. Skinner	100th Career NHL Goal	November 10, 2014
J. McClement	700th Career NHL Game	November 18, 2014
E. Staal	700th Career NHL Point	November 20, 2014
J. Faulk	200th Career NHL Game	November 22, 2014
A. Nestrasil	1st Career NHL Goal	November 22, 2014
A. Semin	500th Career NHL Point	December 4, 2014
R. Hainsey	700th Career NHL Game	December 11, 2014
J. Skinner	200th Career NHL Point	December 16, 2014
A. Semin	600th Career NHL Game	December 21, 2014
E. Staal	800th Career NHL Game	December 29, 2014
E. Staal	300th Career NHL Goal	January 6, 2015
E. Lindholm	100th Career NHL Game	January 10, 2015
J. Skinner	300th Career NHL Game	January 19, 2015
T. Gleason	700th Career NHL Game	January 31, 2015
J. Faulk	100th Career NHL Point	February 7, 2015
B. Bellemore	100th Career NHL Game	February 12, 2015
M. Jordan	1st Career NHL Assist; 1st Career NHL Point	February 14, 2015
M. Jordan	1st Career NHL Goal	February 16, 2015
C. Ward	500th Career NHL Game	February 24, 2015
B. Malone	100th Career NHL Game	February 24, 2015
J. Liles	700th Career NHL Game	February 27, 2015
P. Dwyer	400th Career NHL Game	March 8, 2015
J. Skinner	100th Career NHL Assist	March 17, 2015
J. Staal	600th Career NHL Game	March 29, 2015

== Transactions ==
The Hurricanes have been involved in the following transactions during the 2014–15 season.

=== Trades ===
Date	Details
December 18, 2014	To Winnipeg Jets Jay Harrison	To Carolina Hurricanes OTT's 6th-round pick in 2015
February 25, 2015	To Winnipeg Jets Jiri Tlusty	To Carolina Hurricanes Conditional 5th-round or 6th-round pick in 2015; 3rd-round pick in 2016
February 25, 2015	To Los Angeles Kings Andrej Sekera	To Carolina Hurricanes Roland McKeown; Conditional 1st-round pick in 2015
February 28, 2015	To Washington Capitals Tim Gleason	To Carolina Hurricanes Jack Hillen; ARZ's 4th-round pick in 2015

=== Free agents acquired ===
Date	Player	Former team	Contract terms (in U.S. dollars)	Ref
July 1, 2014	Brad Malone	Colorado Avalanche	2 years, $1.3 million	
July 1, 2014	Drew MacIntyre	Toronto Marlies	1 year, $600,000	
July 1, 2014	Jay McClement	Toronto Maple Leafs	1 year, $1 million	
July 1, 2014	Tim Gleason	Toronto Maple Leafs	1 year, $1.2 million	
July 1, 2014	Ben Holmstrom	Adirondack Phantoms	1 year, $600,000	
March 22, 2015	Rasmus Tirronen	Merrimack College	1 year, $575,000 entry-level contract	
June 15, 2015	Derek Ryan	Orebro HK	1 year, $600,000	

=== Free agents lost ===
Date	Player	New team	Contract terms (in U.S. dollars)	Ref
July 1, 2014	Manny Malhotra	Montreal Canadiens	1 year, $850,000	
July 1, 2014	Justin Peters	Washington Capitals	2 years, $1.9 million	
July 1, 2014	Brett Sutter	Minnesota Wild	2 years, $1.2 million	
July 8, 2104	Matt Corrente	Tampa Bay Lightning	1 year, $550,000	
October 2, 2014	Drayson Bowman	Montreal Canadiens	1 year, $575,000	

=== Claimed via waivers ===
Player	Previous team	Date
Andrej Nestrasil	Detroit Red Wings	November 20, 2014

=== Lost via waivers ===
Player	New team	Date

=== Lost via retirement ===
Player	Date

=== Player signings ===
Date	Player	Contract terms (in U.S. dollars)	Ref
July 1, 2014	Jiri Tlusty	1 year, $2.95 million	
July 2, 2014	Greg Nemisz	1 year, $600,000	
July 2, 2014	Zach Boychuk	1 year, $600,000	
July 3, 2014	Michal Jordan	1 year, $550,000	
July 3, 2014	Jared Staal	1 year, $550,000	
July 14, 2014	Justin Shugg	1 year, $600,000	
July 23, 2014	Rasmus Rissanen	1 year, $575,000	
July 25, 2014	Brett Bellemore	1 year, $600,000	
August 7, 2014	Haydn Fleury	3 years, $2.4975 million entry-level contract	
March 1, 2015	Jay McClement	2 years, $2.4 million contract extension	
March 27, 2015	Brett Pesce	3 years, $2.15 million entry-level contract	
March 27, 2015	Alex Nedeljkovic	3 years, $2.25 million entry-level contract	
April 1, 2015	Roland McKeown	3 years, $2.05 million entry-level contract	
May 29, 2015	Drew MacIntyre	1 year, $600,000	
June 1, 2015	Tyler Ganly	3 years, $1.8 million entry-level contract	
June 11, 2015	Lucas Wallmark	3 years, $1.825 million entry-level contract	
June 18, 2015	Michal Jordan	1 year, $625,000	
June 25, 2015	Chris Terry	1 year, $875,000	

== Draft picks ==
The 2014 NHL entry draft was held on June 27–28, 2014 at the Wells Fargo Center in Philadelphia, Pennsylvania. The Hurricanes will pick 7th overall in the first round.

Round	#	Player	Pos	Nationality	College/Junior/Club team (League)
1	7	Haydn Fleury	(D)	Canada	Red Deer Rebels (WHL)
2	37	Alex Nedeljkovic	(G)	United States	Plymouth Whalers (OHL)
3	67	Warren Foegele	LW	Canada	St. Andrew's Saints (OFSAA)
4	96^{[a]}	Josh Wesley	D	United States	Plymouth Whalers (OHL)
4	97	Lucas Wallmark	RW	Sweden	Luleå HF (SHL)
5	127	Clark Bishop	C	Canada	Cape Breton Screaming Eagles (QMJHL)
7	187	Kyle Jenkins	D	Canada	Sault Ste. Marie Greyhounds (OHL)

Draft notes

- ^{a} Vancouver's fourth-round pick went to Carolina, as the result of a trade on September 29, 2013, that sent Zac Dalpe and Jeremy Welsh to Vancouver, in exchange for Kellan Tochkin and this pick.
- Carolina's sixth-round pick went to the Los Angeles Kings, as the result of a trade on January 13, 2013, that sent Kevin Westgarth to Carolina, in exchange for Anthony Stewart, a fourth round pick in 2013, and this pick.
