= 2014–15 New Jersey Devils season =

National Hockey League season

2014–15 New Jersey Devils
- Division: 7th Metropolitan
- Conference: 13th Eastern
- 2014–15 record: 32–36–14
- Home record: 19–14–8
- Road record: 13–22–6
- Goals for: 181
- Goals against: 216

Team information
- General manager: Lou Lamoriello
- Coach: Peter DeBoer (Oct.–Dec.); Adam Oates and Scott Stevens (Dec.–Apr.)
- Captain: Bryce Salvador
- Alternate captains: Patrik Elias; Andy Greene; Travis Zajac
- Arena: Prudential Center
- Average attendance: 15,189

Team leaders
- Goals: Mike Cammalleri (25)
- Assists: Scott Gomez (27)
- Points: Adam Henrique (40)
- Penalty minutes: Jordin Tootoo (70)
- Plus/minus: Stephen Gionta (+6)
- Wins: Cory Schneider (26)
- Goals against average: Cory Schneider (2.17)

The 2014–15 New Jersey Devils season was the 41st season for the National Hockey League (NHL) franchise that was established on June 11, 1974, and 33rd season since the franchise relocated from Colorado prior to the 1982–83 NHL season. The Devils missed the playoffs for the third straight year.

== Standings ==
Metropolitan Division
Pos	Team	GP	W	L	OTL	ROW	GF	GA	GD	Pts
1	p – New York Rangers	82	53	22	7	49	252	192	+60	113
2	x – Washington Capitals	82	45	26	11	40	242	203	+39	101
3	x – New York Islanders	82	47	28	7	40	252	230	+22	101
4	x – Pittsburgh Penguins	82	43	27	12	39	221	210	+11	98
5	Columbus Blue Jackets	82	42	35	5	33	236	250	−14	89
6	Philadelphia Flyers	82	33	31	18	30	215	234	−19	84
7	New Jersey Devils	82	32	36	14	27	181	216	−35	78
8	Carolina Hurricanes	82	30	41	11	25	188	226	−38	71

Source: National Hockey League
p – Clinched Presidents' Trophy; x – Clinched playoff spot

Eastern Conference Wild Card
Pos	Div	Team	GP	W	L	OTL	ROW	GF	GA	GD	Pts
1	AT	x – Ottawa Senators	82	43	26	13	37	238	215	+23	99
2	ME	x – Pittsburgh Penguins	82	43	27	12	39	221	210	+11	98
3	AT	Boston Bruins	82	41	27	14	37	213	211	+2	96
4	AT	Florida Panthers	82	38	29	15	30	206	223	−17	91
5	ME	Columbus Blue Jackets	82	42	35	5	33	236	250	−14	89
6	ME	Philadelphia Flyers	82	33	31	18	30	215	234	−19	84
7	ME	New Jersey Devils	82	32	36	14	27	181	216	−35	78
8	ME	Carolina Hurricanes	82	30	41	11	25	188	226	−38	71
9	AT	Toronto Maple Leafs	82	30	44	8	25	211	262	−51	68
10	AT	Buffalo Sabres	82	23	51	8	15	161	274	−113	54

Source: National Hockey League
x – Clinched playoff spot

== Suspensions/fines ==
Player	Explanation	Length	Salary	Date issued
Scott Gomez	Elbowing Montreal Canadiens defenseman Alexei Emelin during NHL game No. 1163 in New Jersey on Friday, April 3, 2015, at 14:38 of the second period.	—	$1,478.49	April 4, 2015

== Schedule and results ==
=== Pre-season ===
Pre-season game log: 4–1–1 (Home: 3–0–0; Road: 1–1–1)
#	Date	Visitor	Score	Home	OT	Decision	Attendance	Record	Recap
1	September 22	New Jersey	5–4	NY Rangers		Kinkaid	18,006	1–0–0	Recap
2	September 25	New Jersey	0–4	Philadelphia		Schneider	18,850	1–1–0	Recap
3^{[a]}	September 26	New Jersey	2–3	NY Islanders	SO	Kinkaid	11,823	1–1–1	Recap
4	September 28	Philadelphia	1–3	New Jersey		Clemmensen	10,404	2–1–1	Recap
5	October 2	NY Islanders	1–2	New Jersey	SO	Schneider	10,032	3–1–1	Recap
6	October 4	NY Rangers	0–3	New Jersey		Schneider	13,421	4–1–1	Recap
Notes:^{a} Game was played at Barclays Center in Brooklyn, New York.

=== Regular season ===
Game log

October: 5–3–2 (Home: 1–1–2; Road: 4–2–0)
#	Date	Visitor	Score	Home	OT	Decision	Attendance	Record	Pts	Recap
1	October 9	New Jersey	6–4	Philadelphia		Schneider	19,801	1–0–0	2	Recap
2	October 11	New Jersey	5–1	Florida		Schneider	11,419	2–0–0	4	Recap
3	October 14	New Jersey	2–1	Tampa Bay		Schneider	18,064	3–0–0	6	Recap
4	October 16	New Jersey	2–6	Washington		Schneider	18,506	3–1–0	6	Recap
5	October 18	San Jose	4–2	New Jersey		Schneider	16,592	3–2–0	6	Recap
6	October 21	NY Rangers	4–3	New Jersey	OT	Schneider	14,484	3–2–1	7	Recap
7	October 24	Dallas	3–2	New Jersey	SO	Schneider	14,657	3–2–2	8	Recap
8	October 25	New Jersey	3–2	Ottawa	OT	Schneider	19,266	4–2–2	10	Recap
9	October 28	New Jersey	3–8	Pittsburgh		Schneider	18,650	4–3–2	10	Recap
10	October 30	Winnipeg	1–2	New Jersey	SO	Schneider	12,897	5–3–2	12	Recap

November: 4–8–2 (Home: 2–2–1; Road: 2–6–1)
#	Date	Visitor	Score	Home	OT	Decision	Attendance	Record	Pts	Recap
11	November 1	Columbus	2–3	New Jersey		Schneider	13,542	6–3–2	14	Recap
12	November 4	St. Louis	1–0	New Jersey		Schneider	15,102	6–4–2	14	Recap
13	November 6	New Jersey	3–4	St. Louis		Kinkaid	16,523	6–5–2	14	Recap
14	November 7	New Jersey	2–4	Detroit		Schneider	20,027	6–6–2	14	Recap
15	November 10	New Jersey	2–4	Boston		Schneider	17,565	6–7–2	14	Recap
16	November 11	Minnesota	1–3	New Jersey		Schneider	14,256	7–7–2	16	Recap
17	November 14	New Jersey	1–0	Washington		Schneider	18,506	8–7–2	18	Recap
18	November 15	Colorado	3–2	New Jersey		Schneider	15,626	8–8–2	18	Recap
19	November 18	New Jersey	1–3	Winnipeg		Schneider	15,016	8–9–2	18	Recap
20	November 21	New Jersey	2–0	Edmonton		Schneider	16,839	9–9–2	20	Recap
21	November 22	New Jersey	4–5	Calgary	SO	Clemmensen	18,874	9–9–3	21	Recap
22	November 25	New Jersey	0–2	Vancouver		Schneider	18,606	9–10–3	21	Recap
23	November 28	Detroit	5–4	New Jersey	SO	Schneider	16,592	9–10–4	22	Recap
24	November 29	New Jersey	1–3	NY Islanders		Schneider	16,170	9–11–4	22	Recap

December: 4–8–3 (Home: 2–3–2; Road: 2–5–1)
#	Date	Visitor	Score	Home	OT	Decision	Attendance	Record	Pts	Recap
25	December 2	New Jersey	0–1	Pittsburgh		Schneider	18,572	9–12–4	22	Recap
26	December 4	New Jersey	5–3	Toronto		Schneider	18,877	10–12–4	24	Recap
27	December 6	Washington	4–1	New Jersey		Schneider	15,230	10–13–4	24	Recap
28	December 8	New Jersey	2–1	Carolina		Schneider	9,815	11–13–4	26	Recap
29	December 9	Chicago	3–2	New Jersey	SO	Kinkaid	16,210	11–13–5	27	Recap
30	December 11	New Jersey	1–4	Philadelphia		Schneider	19,572	11–14–5	27	Recap
31	December 13	New Jersey	3–4	Dallas		Schneider	16,110	11–15–5	27	Recap
32	December 15	New Jersey	2–3	NY Islanders	SO	Kinkaid	13,408	11–15–6	28	Recap
33	December 17	Ottawa	2–0	New Jersey		Schneider	15,379	11–16–6	28	Recap
34	December 19	Tampa Bay	3–2	New Jersey	SO	Kinkaid	14,916	12–16–6	30	Recap
35	December 20	Washington	4–0	New Jersey		Schneider	14,776	12–17–6	30	Recap
36	December 23	Carolina	2–1	New Jersey	SO	Schneider	16,101	12–17–7	31	Recap
37	December 27	New Jersey	1–3	NY Rangers		Schneider	18,006	12–18–7	31	Recap
38	December 29	Pittsburgh	1–3	New Jersey		Schneider	16,592	13–18–7	33	Recap
39	December 31	New Jersey	1–3	Detroit		Schneider	20,027	13–19–7	33	Recap

January: 6–3–2 (Home: 4–1–2; Road: 2–2–0)
#	Date	Visitor	Score	Home	OT	Decision	Attendance	Record	Pts	Recap
40	January 2	Montreal	4–2	New Jersey		Kinkaid	16,174	13–20–7	33	Recap
41	January 3	Philadelphia	2–5	New Jersey		Schneider	15,066	14–20–7	35	Recap
42	January 6	Buffalo	1–4	New Jersey		Schneider	15,162	15–20–7	37	Recap
43	January 8	New Jersey	0–3	Boston		Schneider	17,565	15–21–7	37	Recap
44	January 9	NY Islanders	3–2	New Jersey	OT	Kinkaid	16,592	15–21–8	38	Recap
45	January 14	New Jersey	5–3	Los Angeles		Schneider	18,230	16–21–8	40	Recap
46	January 16	New Jersey	1–5	Anaheim		Schneider	17,174	16–22–8	40	Recap
47	January 19	New Jersey	5–2	San Jose		Schneider	17,562	17–22–8	42	Recap
48	January 28	Toronto	1–2	New Jersey	SO	Schneider	15,882	18–22–8	44	Recap
49	January 30	Pittsburgh	2–1	New Jersey	OT	Schneider	16,592	18–22–9	45	Recap
50	January 31	Florida	1–3	New Jersey		Kinkaid	16,278	19–22–9	47	Recap

February: 7–5–1 (Home: 6–2–1; Road: 1–3–0)
#	Date	Visitor	Score	Home	OT	Decision	Attendance	Record	Pts	Recap
51	February 3	Ottawa	1–2	New Jersey		Schneider	11,461	20–22–9	49	Recap
52	February 6	Toronto	1–4	New Jersey		Schneider	15,594	21–22–9	51	Recap
53	February 7	New Jersey	2–6	Montreal		Kinkaid	21,287	21–23–9	51	Recap
54	February 9	Edmonton	2–1	New Jersey		Schneider	11,519	21–24–9	51	Recap
55	February 13	New Jersey	1–3	Chicago		Schneider	22,186	21–25–9	51	Recap
56	February 14	New Jersey	1–3	Nashville		Schneider	17,333	21–26–9	51	Recap
57	February 17	Buffalo	1–2	New Jersey	SO	Schneider	13,517	22–26–9	53	Recap
58	February 20	Vancouver	2–4	New Jersey		Schneider	14,822	23–26–9	55	Recap
59	February 21	Carolina	1–3	New Jersey		Kinkaid	15,610	24–26–9	57	Recap
60	February 23	Arizona	0–3	New Jersey		Schneider	12,159	25–26–9	59	Recap
61	February 25	Calgary	3–1	New Jersey		Schneider	13,662	25–27–9	59	Recap
62	February 27	Boston	3–2	New Jersey	OT	Schneider	16,592	25–27–10	60	Recap
63	February 28	New Jersey	2–0	Columbus		Schneider	17,814	26–27–10	62	Recap

March: 5–6–3 (Home: 3–4–0; Road: 2–2–3)
#	Date	Visitor	Score	Home	OT	Decision	Attendance	Record	Pts	Recap
64	March 3	Nashville	1–3	New Jersey		Schneider	13,012	27–27–10	64	Recap
65	March 6	Columbus	3–2	New Jersey		Schneider	16,213	27–28–10	64	Recap
66	March 8	Philadelphia	2–5	New Jersey		Kinkaid	16,592	28–28–10	66	Recap
67	March 10	New Jersey	2–6	Minnesota		Schneider	19,034	28–29–10	66	Recap
68	March 12	New Jersey	1–2	Colorado	SO	Schneider	14,607	28–29–11	67	Recap
69	March 14	New Jersey	4–1	Arizona		Schneider	12,425	29–29–11	69	Recap
70	March 17	Pittsburgh	0–2	New Jersey		Schneider	15,848	30–29–11	71	Recap
71	March 20	New Jersey	3–1	Buffalo		Kinkaid	19,070	31–29–11	73	Recap
72	March 21	NY Islanders	3–0	New Jersey		Schneider	16,592	31–30–11	73	Recap
73	March 23	Los Angeles	3–1	New Jersey		Schneider	15,721	31–31–11	73	Recap
74	March 26	New Jersey	2–3	Washington	OT	Schneider	18,506	31–31–12	74	Recap
75	March 28	New Jersey	1–3	Carolina		Kinkaid	12,578	31–32–12	74	Recap
76	March 29	Anaheim	2–1	New Jersey		Schneider	15,987	31–33–12	74	Recap
77	March 31	New Jersey	2–3	Columbus	OT	Schneider	14,524	31–33–13	75	Recap

April: 1–3–1 (Home: 1–1–0; Road: 0–2–1)
#	Date	Visitor	Score	Home	OT	Decision	Attendance	Record	Pts	Recap
78	April 3	Montreal	2–3	New Jersey	SO	Kinkaid	16,592	32–33–13	77	Recap
79	April 4	New Jersey	1–6	NY Rangers		Kinkaid	18,006	32–34–13	77	Recap
80	April 7	NY Rangers	4–2	New Jersey		Schneider	16,592	32–35–13	77	Recap
81	April 9	New Jersey	3–4	Tampa Bay	OT	Kinkaid	19,204	32–35–14	78	Recap
82	April 11	New Jersey	2–3	Florida		Schneider	12,236	32–36–14	78	Recap

Legend: Win (2 points) Loss (0 points) Overtime/shootout loss (1 point)

== Player statistics ==
Final stats

Skaters

Regular season
Player	GP	G	A	Pts	+/−	PIM
Adam Henrique	75	16	27	43	−6	34
Michael Cammalleri	68	27	15	42	2	28
Patrik Elias	69	13	21	34	−20	12
Scott Gomez	58	7	27	34	−10	23
Steve Bernier	67	16	16	32	2	28
Jaromir Jagr^{‡}	57	11	18	29	−10	42
Travis Zajac	74	11	14	25	−3	29
Adam Larsson	64	3	21	24	2	34
Marek Zidlicky^{‡}	63	4	19	23	−7	42
Andy Greene	82	3	19	22	1	20
Michael Ryder	47	6	13	19	−1	30
Eric Gelinas	61	6	13	19	−2	42
Damon Severson	51	5	12	17	−13	22
Jordin Tootoo	68	10	5	15	1	72
Martin Havlat	40	5	9	14	−11	10
Jon Merrill	66	2	12	14	−14	24
Tuomo Ruutu	77	7	6	13	−3	28
Stephen Gionta	61	5	8	13	4	12
Jacob Josefson	62	6	5	11	0	24
Dainius Zubrus	74	4	6	10	−9	42
Damien Brunner^{‡}	17	2	5	7	−1	8
Peter Harrold	43	3	2	5	−10	4
Ryane Clowe	13	1	3	4	−1	4
Mark Fraser	34	0	4	4	2	55
Bryce Salvador	15	0	2	2	−5	20
Tim Sestito	15	0	2	2	−1	33
Seth Helgeson	22	0	2	2	4	18
Joe Whitney	4	1	0	1	−1	0
Reid Boucher	11	1	0	1	−4	0
Stefan Matteau	7	1	0	1	0	4
Mike Sislo	10	0	1	1	−2	2
Raman Hrabarenka	1	0	0	0	1	0

Goaltenders

Regular season
Player	GP	GS	TOI	W	L	OT	GA	GAA	SA	SV%	SO	G	A	PIM
Cory Schneider	69	68	3924	26	31	9	148	2.26	1982	0.925	5	0	2	0
Keith Kinkaid	19	13	925	6	5	4	40	2.59	469	0.915	0	0	0	0
Scott Clemmensen	3	1	102	0	0	1	8	4.71	54	0.852	0	0	0	0

^{†}Denotes player spent time with another team before joining the Devils. Stats reflect time with the Devils only.
^{‡}Denotes player was traded mid-season. Stats reflect time with the Devils only.
Bold/italics denotes franchise record.

== Notable achievements ==
=== Awards ===
Regular season
Player	Award	Awarded
P. Elias	NHL All-Star game selection	January 10, 2015

=== Milestones ===
Regular season
Player	Milestone	Reached
D. Severson	1st career NHL game	October 9, 2014
D. Severson	1st career NHL goal 1st career NHL assist 1st career NHL point	October 11, 2014
M. Sislo	1st career NHL assist 1st career NHL point	November 6, 2014
S. Helgeson	1st career NHL game 1st career NHL assist 1st career NHL point	November 11, 2014
S. Clemmensen	10,000 career NHL minutes	November 22, 2014
A. Greene	500th career NHL game	November 28, 2014
M. Zidlicky	300th career NHL assist	December 4, 2014
J. Jagr	1,500th career NHL game	December 8, 2014
S. Bernier	200th career NHL point	December 13, 2014
K. Kinkaid	1st career NHL win	December 19, 2014
S. Gomez	1,000th career NHL game	December 27, 2014
C. Schneider	10,000 career NHL minutes	December 29, 2014
D. Zubrus	1,200th career NHL game	December 31, 2014
J. Whitney	1st career NHL goal 1st career NHL point	December 31, 2014
P. Elias	600th career NHL assist 1,000th career NHL point	January 6, 2015
M. Cammalleri	700th career NHL game	January 8, 2015
M. Ryder	800th career NHL game	January 16, 2015
T. Sestito	100th career NHL game	January 16, 2015
P. Elias	400th career NHL goal	February 6, 2015

== Transactions ==
The Devils have been involved in the following transactions during the 2014–15 season.

=== Trades ===
Date	Details
February 26, 2015	To Florida Panthers Jaromir Jagr	To New Jersey Devils 2nd-round pick in 2015; Conditional 3rd-round pick in 2016
March 2, 2015	To Detroit Red Wings Marek Zidlicky	To New Jersey Devils Conditional 3rd-round pick in 2016

=== Free agents acquired ===
Date	Player	Former team	Contract terms (in U.S. dollars)	Ref
July 1, 2014	Mike Cammalleri	Calgary Flames	5 years, $25 million	
July 1, 2014	Martin Havlat	San Jose Sharks	1 year, $1.5 million	
July 1, 2014	Scott Clemmensen	Florida Panthers	1 year, $600,000	
October 7, 2014	Jordin Tootoo	Detroit Red Wings	1 year, $550,000	
December 1, 2014	Scott Gomez	Florida Panthers	1 year, $550,000	
May 29, 2015	Sergey Kalinin	Avangard Omsk	entry-level contract	
June 15, 2015	Vojtech Mozik	HC Plzeň	entry-level contract	

=== Free agents lost ===
Date	Player	New team	Contract terms (in U.S. dollars)	Ref
July 1, 2014	Mark Fayne	Edmonton Oilers	4 years, $14 million	
July 7, 2014	Anton Volchenkov	Nashville Predators	1 year, $1 million	
August 14, 2014	Mattias Tedenby	HV71	2 years	
October 6, 2014	Ryan Carter	Minnesota Wild	1 year, $725,000	
December 2, 2014	Martin Brodeur	St. Louis Blues	1 year, $700,000	

=== Claimed via waivers ===
Player	Previous team	Date

=== Lost via waivers ===
Player	New team	Date

=== Players released ===
Date	Player	Via	Ref
June 30, 2014	Anton Volchenkov	Compliance buyout	

=== Player signings ===
Date	Player	Contract terms (in U.S. dollars)	Ref
July 1, 2014	Corbin McPherson	1 years, $550,000	
July 2, 2014	Steve Bernier	1 year, $600,000	
July 2, 2014	Stephen Gionta	2 years, $1.7 million	
July 9, 2014	Cory Schneider	7 years, $42 million	
July 30, 2014	Andy Greene	5 years, $25 million	
September 15, 2014	Eric Gelinas	1 year, $900,000	
April 14, 2015	Keith Kinkaid	2 years, contract extension	
May 9, 2015	Jordin Tootoo	1 year, $825,000	
May 27, 2015	Ryan Kujawinski	entry-level contract	
May 27, 2015	Blake Pietila	entry-level contract	
June 22, 2015	Scott Wedgewood	2 years, $1.175 million	

=== Lost via retirement ===
Player	Date

== Draft picks ==
Below are the New Jersey Devils' selections made at the 2014 NHL entry draft, held on June 27–28, 2014, at the Wells Fargo Center in Philadelphia. The team finished the previous season ranked 20th in the league, but were relegated to select 30th overall for attempting to circumvent the salary cap in 2010.

Round	#	Player	Pos	Nationality	College/junior/club team (league)
1	30	John Quenneville	C	Canada	Brandon Wheat Kings (WHL)
2	41	Joshua Jacobs	D	United States	Indiana Ice (USHL)
3	71	Connor Chatham	RW	United States	Plymouth Whalers (OHL)
5	131	Ryan Rehill	D	Canada	Kamloops Blazers (WHL)
6	152^{a}	Joey Dudek	C	United States	Kimball Union Academy (High-NH)
6	161	Brandon Baddock	LW	Canada	Edmonton Oil Kings (WHL)

Draft notes

- New Jersey will pick 30th overall in the first round. The Devils were expected to forfeit their first-round pick in 2014 (they elected to keep their first-round picks in 2011, 2012 and 2013) as the result of a penalty sanction due to cap circumvention when signing Ilya Kovalchuk. The penalty also included a fine of $3 million and the forfeit of the Devils' third round pick in 2011. The NHL partially rescinded the penalty keeping all of the penalties, except for modifying the first-round pick and reducing the fine to $1.5 million.
- New Jersey's fourth-round pick will go to the Winnipeg Jets as the result of a trade on February 13, 2013, that sent Alexei Ponikarovsky to New Jersey in exchange for a seventh-round pick in 2013 and this pick.
- ^{a} The Florida Panthers' sixth-round pick will go to New Jersey as the result of a trade on September 28, 2013, that sent Krys Barch and St. Louis' seventh-round pick in 2015 to Florida in exchange for Scott Timmins and this pick.
- New Jersey's seventh-round pick will go to Arizona as the result of a trade on April 3, 2013, that sent Steve Sullivan to New Jersey in exchange for this pick.
