= 2014–15 Pittsburgh Penguins season =

NHL team season

2014–15 Pittsburgh Penguins
- Division: 4th Metropolitan
- Conference: 8th Eastern
- 2014–15 record: 43–27–12
- Home record: 23–14–4
- Road record: 20–13–8
- Goals for: 221
- Goals against: 210

Team information
- General manager: Jim Rutherford
- Coach: Mike Johnston
- Captain: Sidney Crosby
- Alternate captains: Chris Kunitz; Evgeni Malkin
- Arena: Consol Energy Center
- Average attendance: 18,617 (41 games)
- Minor league affiliates: WBS Penguins (AHL); Wheeling Nailers (ECHL)

Team leaders
- Goals: Evgeni Malkin and Sidney Crosby (28)
- Assists: Sidney Crosby (56)
- Points: Sidney Crosby (84)
- Penalty minutes: Steve Downie (238)
- Plus/minus: Paul Martin (+17)
- Wins: Marc-Andre Fleury (34)
- Goals against average: Jeff Zatkoff (1.62)

The 2014–15 Pittsburgh Penguins season was the 48th season for the National Hockey League (NHL) franchise that was established on June 5, 1967.

It was a somewhat slow season for the Penguins, as they finished with a sub-.600 points percentage for the first time in 9 years.

== Off-season ==
On May 16, 2014, Penguins' co-owners Mario Lemieux and Ron Burkle fired general manager Ray Shero after the team captured the Metropolitan Division title, but failed to beat the New York Rangers in the Eastern Conference Semi-finals. On June 6, 2014, the Penguins named Jim Rutherford as the new GM, and fired Head Coach Dan Bylsma. On June 25, 2014, over two weeks after new GM Rutherford fired Bylsma, the Penguins appointed Mike Johnston as their new head coach. They also proceeded to fire Tony Granato and Todd Reirden while hiring Rick Tocchet as an assistant coach to Johnston.

On June 27, 2014, during the first round of the 2014 NHL entry draft, the Penguins traded right winger James Neal to the Nashville Predators in exchange for right winger Patric Hornqvist and restricted free agent Nick Spaling.

== Pre-season ==
The Penguins released their 2014 pre-season schedule on June 18, 2014.

=== Game log ===
2014 Pre-season game log: 3–3–0 (Home: 2–1–0; Road: 1–2–0)

| # | Date | Time (ET) | Visitor | Score | Home | Television | Record |
|---|---|---|---|---|---|---|---|
| 1 | Sept 22 | 7:00 pm | Detroit Red Wings | 2–1 | Pittsburgh Penguins | WPCW | 0–1–0 |
| 2 | Sept 23 | 7:00 pm | Pittsburgh Penguins | 0–2 | Columbus Blue Jackets | – | 0–2–0 |
| 3 | Sept 25 | 7:00 pm | Minnesota Wild | 2–3 OT | Pittsburgh Penguins | – | 1–2–0 |
| 4 | Sept 27 | 4:00 pm | Columbus Blue Jackets | 1–2 | Pittsburgh Penguins | WPCW | 2–2–0 |
| 5 | Sept 29 | 8:00 pm | Pittsburgh Penguins | 1–4 | Minnesota Wild | ROOT | 2–3–0 |
| 6 | Oct 1 | 7:30 pm | Pittsburgh Penguins | 2–0 | Detroit Red Wings | ROOT | 3–3–0 |

Legend: = Win = Loss = OT/SO Loss

=== Statistics ===
Updated as of October 2, 2014
Note – Statistics compiled from Official Game/Event Summaries from NHL.com

Preseason statistics

Skaters
| Player | GP | G | A | Pts | +/− | PIM |
|---|---|---|---|---|---|---|
| Blake Comeau | 5 | 1 | 3 | 4 | 2 | 6 |
| Oskar Sundqvist | 5 | 2 | 1 | 3 | 1 | 2 |
| Brandon Sutter | 4 | 2 | 1 | 3 | 1 | 0 |
| Nick Spaling | 5 | 0 | 2 | 2 | 2 | 2 |
| Marcel Goc | 4 | 0 | 2 | 2 | −1 | 0 |
| Simon Despres | 4 | 0 | 2 | 2 | 3 | 9 |
| Beau Bennett | 2 | 1 | 1 | 2 | 2 | 4 |
| Steve Downie | 5 | 1 | 0 | 1 | −2 | 2 |
| Andrew Ebbett | 4 | 1 | 0 | 1 | 2 | 2 |
| Christian Ehrhoff | 4 | 0 | 1 | 1 | 0 | 0 |
| Kasperi Kapanen | 4 | 1 | 0 | 1 | 0 | 0 |
| Kris Letang | 4 | 0 | 1 | 1 | −1 | 2 |
| Craig Adams | 3 | 0 | 1 | 1 | −1 | 4 |
| Rob Scuderi | 3 | 0 | 1 | 1 | 1 | 0 |
| Taylor Chorney | 3 | 0 | 1 | 1 | −1 | 2 |
| Scott Harrington | 5 | 0 | 0 | 0 | 1 | 0 |
| Patric Hornqvist | 4 | 0 | 0 | 0 | −1 | 2 |
| Paul Martin | 4 | 0 | 0 | 0 | 0 | 2 |
| Zach Sill | 4 | 0 | 0 | 0 | 0 | 2 |
| Brian Dumoulin | 3 | 0 | 0 | 0 | −3 | 5 |
| Chris Kunitz | 3 | 0 | 0 | 0 | −1 | 0 |
| Bobby Farnham | 2 | 0 | 0 | 0 | 0 | 6 |
| Daniel Carcillo | 2 | 0 | 0 | 0 | −1 | 0 |
| Jayson Megna | 2 | 0 | 0 | 0 | 0 | 0 |
| Pierre-Luc Letourneau-Leblond | 2 | 0 | 0 | 0 | 0 | 9 |
| Pascal Dupuis | 2 | 0 | 0 | 0 | −1 | 4 |
| Philip Samuelsson | 2 | 0 | 0 | 0 | 1 | 0 |
| Robert Bortuzzo | 2 | 0 | 0 | 0 | 1 | 4 |
| Tom Kostopoulos | 2 | 0 | 0 | 0 | 0 | 0 |
| Adam Payerl | 1 | 0 | 0 | 0 | 0 | 2 |
| Anton Zlobin | 1 | 0 | 0 | 0 | 1 | 0 |
| Bryan Rust | 1 | 0 | 0 | 0 | −1 | 0 |
| Dominik Uher | 1 | 0 | 0 | 0 | 0 | 0 |
| Harrison Ruopp | 1 | 0 | 0 | 0 | −1 | 0 |
| Josh Archibald | 1 | 0 | 0 | 0 | 0 | 0 |
| Jean-Sebastien Dea | 1 | 0 | 0 | 0 | 0 | 0 |
| Reid McNeill | 1 | 0 | 0 | 0 | 1 | 0 |
| Sidney Crosby | 1 | 0 | 0 | 0 | 0 | 0 |
| Scott Wilson | 1 | 0 | 0 | 0 | 0 | 0 |
| Tom Kuhnhackl | 1 | 0 | 0 | 0 | −1 | 2 |

== Regular season ==
=== Game log ===
2014–15 schedule
October: 6–2–1 (Home: 4–2–0; Road: 2–0–1), 13 Points

| # | Oct | Time (ET) | Visitor | Score | Home | Location/Attendance | Record | Points |
|---|---|---|---|---|---|---|---|---|
| 1 | 9 | 7:00 pm | Anaheim Ducks | 4–6 | Pittsburgh Penguins | Consol Energy Center (18,633) | 1–0–0 | 2 |
| 2 | 11 | 7:00 pm | Pittsburgh Penguins | 5–2 | Toronto Maple Leafs | Air Canada Centre (19,039) | 2–0–0 | 4 |
| 3 | 16 | 7:00 pm | Dallas Stars | 3–2 | Pittsburgh Penguins | Consol Energy Center (18,615) | 2–1–0 | 4 |
| 4 | 18 | 7:00 pm | New York Islanders | 1–3 | Pittsburgh Penguins | Consol Energy Center (18,655) | 3–1–0 | 6 |
| 5 | 22^{[A]} | 8:00 pm | Philadelphia Flyers | 5–3 | Pittsburgh Penguins | Consol Energy Center (18,661) | 3–2–0 | 6 |
| 6 | 23 | 7:30 pm | Pittsburgh Penguins | 3–4 OT | Detroit Red Wings | Joe Louis Arena (20,027) | 3–2–1 | 7 |
| 7 | 25 | 8:00 pm | Pittsburgh Penguins | 3–0 | Nashville Predators | Bridgestone Arena (17,218) | 4–2–1 | 9 |
| 8 | 28 | 7:00 pm | New Jersey Devils | 3–8 | Pittsburgh Penguins | Consol Energy Center (18,650) | 5–2–1 | 11 |
| 9 | 30 | 7:00 pm | Los Angeles Kings | 0–3 | Pittsburgh Penguins | Consol Energy Center (18,570) | 6–2–1 | 13 |

November: 10–3–1 (Home: 3–1–1; Road: 7–2–0), 21 Points

| # | Nov | Time (ET) | Visitor | Score | Home | Location/Attendance | Record | Points |
|---|---|---|---|---|---|---|---|---|
| 10 | 1 | 7:00 pm | Buffalo Sabres | 0–5 | Pittsburgh Penguins | Consol Energy Center (18,652) | 7–2–1 | 15 |
| 11 | 4 | 8:00 pm | Pittsburgh Penguins | 4–1 | Minnesota Wild | Xcel Energy Center (18,788) | 8–2–1 | 17 |
| 12 | 6 | 8:00 pm | Pittsburgh Penguins | 4–3 SO | Winnipeg Jets | MTS Centre (15,016) | 9–2–1 | 19 |
| 13 | 8 | 7:00 pm | Pittsburgh Penguins | 6–1 | Buffalo Sabres | First Niagara Center (19,070) | 10–2–1 | 21 |
| 14 | 11 | 7:00 pm | Pittsburgh Penguins | 0–5 | New York Rangers | Madison Square Garden (18,006) | 10–3–1 | 21 |
| 15 | 14 | 7:30 pm | Pittsburgh Penguins | 2–1 | Toronto Maple Leafs | Air Canada Centre (19,295) | 11–3–1 | 23 |
| 16 | 15^{[A]} | 7:00 pm | New York Rangers | 2–3 SO | Pittsburgh Penguins | Consol Energy Center (18,652) | 12–3–1 | 25 |
| 17 | 18 | 7:30 pm | Pittsburgh Penguins | 4–0 | Montreal Canadiens | Bell Centre (21,287) | 13–3–1 | 27 |
| 18 | 21 | 7:00 pm | New York Islanders | 5–4 SO | Pittsburgh Penguins | Consol Energy Center (18,653) | 13–3–2 | 28 |
| 19 | 22 | 7:00 pm | Pittsburgh Penguins | 1–4 | New York Islanders | Nassau Coliseum (16,170) | 13–4–2 | 28 |
| 20 | 24 | 7:00 pm | Pittsburgh Penguins | 3–2 OT | Boston Bruins | TD Garden (17,565) | 14–4–2 | 30 |
| 21 | 26^{[A]} | 7:30 pm | Toronto Maple Leafs | 3–4 OT | Pittsburgh Penguins | Consol Energy Center (18,645) | 15–4–2 | 32 |
| 22 | 28 | 7:00 pm | Carolina Hurricanes | 4–2 | Pittsburgh Penguins | Consol Energy Center (18,665) | 15–5–2 | 32 |
| 23 | 29 | 7:00 pm | Pittsburgh Penguins | 3–2 | Carolina Hurricanes | PNC Arena (11,225) | 16–5–2 | 34 |

December: 7–4–3 (Home: 7–2–0; Road: 0–2–3), 17 Points

| # | Dec | Time (ET) | Visitor | Score | Home | Location/Attendance | Record | Points |
|---|---|---|---|---|---|---|---|---|
| 24 | 2 | 7:00 pm | New Jersey Devils | 0–1 | Pittsburgh Penguins | Consol Energy Center (18,572) | 17–5–2 | 36 |
| 25 | 4 | 7:00 pm | Vancouver Canucks | 3–0 | Pittsburgh Penguins | Consol Energy Center (18,463) | 17–6–2 | 36 |
| 26 | 6 | 1:00 pm | Ottawa Senators | 2–3 | Pittsburgh Penguins | Consol Energy Center (18,492) | 18–6–2 | 38 |
| 27 | 8^{[A]} | 7:00 pm | Pittsburgh Penguins | 3–4 OT | New York Rangers | Madison Square Garden (18,006) | 18–6–3 | 39 |
| 28 | 12 | 7:00 pm | Calgary Flames | 1–3 | Pittsburgh Penguins | Consol Energy Center (18,471) | 19–6–3 | 41 |
| 29 | 13 | 7:00 pm | Pittsburgh Penguins | 3–4 SO | Columbus Blue Jackets | Nationwide Arena (18,663) | 19–6–4 | 42 |
| 30 | 15 | 7:00 pm | Tampa Bay Lightning | 2–4 | Pittsburgh Penguins | Consol Energy Center (18,487) | 20–6–4 | 44 |
| 31 | 18^{[A]} | 7:00 pm | Colorado Avalanche | 0–1 OT | Pittsburgh Penguins | Consol Energy Center (18,603) | 21–6–4 | 46 |
| 32 | 20 | 7:00 pm | Florida Panthers | 1–3 | Pittsburgh Penguins | Consol Energy Center (18,668) | 22–6–4 | 48 |
| 33 | 22 | 7:30 pm | Pittsburgh Penguins | 3–4 SO | Florida Panthers | BB&T Center (15,947) | 22–6–5 | 49 |
| 34 | 23 | 7:30 pm | Pittsburgh Penguins | 3–4 | Tampa Bay Lightning | Tampa Bay Times Forum (19,204) | 22–7–5 | 49 |
| 35 | 27 | 7:00 pm | Washington Capitals | 3–0 | Pittsburgh Penguins | Consol Energy Center (18,663) | 22–8–5 | 49 |
| 36 | 29 | 7:00 pm | Pittsburgh Penguins | 1–3 | New Jersey Devils | Prudential Center (16,592) | 22–9–5 | 49 |
| 37 | 31^{[A]} | 7:00 pm | Carolina Hurricanes | 1–2 | Pittsburgh Penguins | Consol Energy Center (18,639) | 23–9–5 | 51 |

January: 5–4–3 (Home: 3–2–2; Road: 2–2–1), 13 Points

| # | Jan | Time (ET) | Visitor | Score | Home | Location/Attendance | Record | Points |
|---|---|---|---|---|---|---|---|---|
| 38 | 2 | 7:00 pm | Tampa Bay Lightning | 3–6 | Pittsburgh Penguins | Consol Energy Center (18,655) | 24–9–5 | 53 |
| 39 | 3 | 7:00 pm | Montreal Canadiens | 4–1 | Pittsburgh Penguins | Consol Energy Center (18,630) | 24–10–5 | 53 |
| 40 | 7 | 8:00 pm | Boston Bruins | 3–2 OT | Pittsburgh Penguins | Consol Energy Center (18,650) | 24–10–6 | 54 |
| 41 | 10 | 7:00 pm | Pittsburgh Penguins | 2–1 OT | Montreal Canadiens | Bell Centre (21,287) | 25–10–6 | 56 |
| 42 | 13^{[A]} | 7:00 pm | Minnesota Wild | 2–7 | Pittsburgh Penguins | Consol Energy Center (18,642) | 26–10–6 | 58 |
| 43 | 16 | 7:00 pm | Pittsburgh Penguins | 3–6 | New York Islanders | Nassau Coliseum (16,170) | 26–11–6 | 58 |
| 44 | 18 | 12:30 pm | New York Rangers | 5–2 | Pittsburgh Penguins | Consol Energy Center (18,687) | 26–12–6 | 58 |
| 45 | 20 | 7:00 pm | Pittsburgh Penguins | 2–3 OT | Philadelphia Flyers | Wells Fargo Center (19,982) | 26–12–7 | 59 |
| 46 | 21^{[A]} | 8:00 pm | Chicago Blackhawks | 2–3 SO | Pittsburgh Penguins | Consol Energy Center (18,655) | 26–12–8 | 60 |
| 47 | 27 | 7:00 pm | Winnipeg Jets | 3–5 | Pittsburgh Penguins | Consol Energy Center (18,627) | 27–12–8 | 62 |
| 48 | 28 | 8:00 pm | Pittsburgh Penguins | 0–4 | Washington Capitals | Verizon Center (18,506) | 27–13–8 | 62 |
| 49 | 30 | 7:00 pm | Pittsburgh Penguins | 2–1 OT | New Jersey Devils | Prudential Center (16,592) | 28–13–8 | 64 |

February: 7–4–1 (Home: 2–3–0; Road: 5–1–1), 15 Points

| # | Feb | Time (ET) | Visitor | Score | Home | Location/Attendance | Record | Points |
|---|---|---|---|---|---|---|---|---|
| 50 | 1 | 2:00 pm | Nashville Predators | 4–0 | Pittsburgh Penguins | Consol Energy Center (18,535) | 28–14–8 | 64 |
| 51 | 4 | 8:00 pm | Pittsburgh Penguins | 2–0 | Edmonton Oilers | Rexall Place (16,839) | 29–14–8 | 66 |
| 52 | 6 | 9:00 pm | Pittsburgh Penguins | 4–0 | Calgary Flames | Scotiabank Saddledome (19,289) | 30–14–8 | 68 |
| 53 | 7 | 10:00 pm | Pittsburgh Penguins | 0–5 | Vancouver Canucks | Rogers Arena (18,870) | 30–15–8 | 68 |
| 54 | 11 | 8:00 pm | Detroit Red Wings | 1–4 | Pittsburgh Penguins | Consol Energy Center (18,580) | 31–15–8 | 70 |
| 55 | 12 | 7:30 pm | Pittsburgh Penguins | 5–4 SO | Ottawa Senators | Canadian Tire Centre (18,826) | 32–15–8 | 72 |
| 56 | 15 | 12:30 pm | Pittsburgh Penguins | 1–2 SO | Chicago Blackhawks | United Center (22,169) | 32–15–9 | 73 |
| 57 | 17^{[A]} | 7:00 pm | Washington Capitals | 3–1 | Pittsburgh Penguins | Consol Energy Center (18,602) | 32–16–9 | 73 |
| 58 | 19 | 7:00 pm | Columbus Blue Jackets | 2–1 | Pittsburgh Penguins | Consol Energy Center (18,597) | 32–17–9 | 73 |
| 59 | 21 | 8:00 pm | Pittsburgh Penguins | 4–2 | St. Louis Blues | Scottrade Center (19,621) | 33–17–9 | 75 |
| 60 | 22 | 6:00 pm | Florida Panthers | 1–5 | Pittsburgh Penguins | Consol Energy Center (18,592) | 34–17–9 | 77 |
| 61 | 25 | 8:00 pm | Pittsburgh Penguins | 4–3 | Washington Capitals | Verizon Center (18,506) | 35–17–9 | 79 |

March: 7–6–2 (Home: 4–2–1; Road: 3–4–1), 16 Points

| # | Mar | Time (ET) | Visitor | Score | Home | Location/Attendance | Record | Points |
|---|---|---|---|---|---|---|---|---|
| 62 | 1 | 5:00 pm | Columbus Blue Jackets | 3–5 | Pittsburgh Penguins | Consol Energy Center (18,581) | 36–17–9 | 81 |
| 63 | 4 | 10:00 pm | Pittsburgh Penguins | 1–3 | Colorado Avalanche | Pepsi Center (16,905) | 36–18–9 | 81 |
| 64 | 6 | 10:00 pm | Pittsburgh Penguins | 5–2 | Anaheim Ducks | Honda Center (17,310) | 37–18–9 | 83 |
| 65 | 7 | 10:00 pm | Pittsburgh Penguins | 1–0 OT | Los Angeles Kings | Staples Center (18,487) | 38–18–9 | 85 |
| 66 | 9 | 10:30 pm | Pittsburgh Penguins | 1–2 SO | San Jose Sharks | SAP Center at San Jose (17,336) | 38–18–10 | 86 |
| 67 | 12 | 7:00 pm | Edmonton Oilers | 4–6 | Pittsburgh Penguins | Consol Energy Center (18,662) | 39–18–10 | 88 |
| 68 | 14^{[A]} | 1:00 pm | Boston Bruins | 2–0 | Pittsburgh Penguins | Consol Energy Center (18,651) | 39–19–10 | 88 |
| 69 | 15^{[A]} | 7:30 pm | Detroit Red Wings | 5–1 | Pittsburgh Penguins | Consol Energy Center (18,668) | 39–20–10 | 88 |
| 70 | 17 | 7:00 pm | Pittsburgh Penguins | 0–2 | New Jersey Devils | Prudential Center (15,848) | 39–21–10 | 88 |
| 71 | 19 | 8:30 pm | Pittsburgh Penguins | 1–2 | Dallas Stars | American Airlines Center (18,532) | 39–22–10 | 88 |
| 72 | 21 | 9:00 pm | Pittsburgh Penguins | 3–1 | Arizona Coyotes | Jobing.com Arena (15,581) | 40–22–10 | 90 |
| 73 | 24 | 7:00 pm | St. Louis Blues | 3–2 OT | Pittsburgh Penguins | Consol Energy Center (18,631) | 40–22–11 | 91 |
| 74 | 26 | 7:00 pm | Pittsburgh Penguins | 2–5 | Carolina Hurricanes | PNC Arena (13,738) | 40–23–11 | 91 |
| 75 | 28 | 1:00 pm | Arizona Coyotes | 2–3 | Pittsburgh Penguins | Consol Energy Center (18,627) | 41–23–11 | 93 |
| 76 | 29 | 7:30 pm | San Jose Sharks | 2–3 SO | Pittsburgh Penguins | Consol Energy Center (18,620) | 42–23–11 | 95 |

April: 1–4–1 (Home: 0–2–0; Road: 1–2–1), 3 Points

| # | Apr | Time (ET) | Visitor | Score | Home | Location/Attendance | Record | Points |
|---|---|---|---|---|---|---|---|---|
| 77 | 1^{[A]} | 8:00 pm | Philadelphia Flyers | 4–1 | Pittsburgh Penguins | Consol Energy Center (18,664) | 42–24–11 | 95 |
| 78 | 4 | 2:00 pm | Pittsburgh Penguins | 3–5 | Columbus Blue Jackets | Nationwide Arena (18,513) | 42–25–11 | 95 |
| 79 | 5 | 7:30 pm | Pittsburgh Penguins | 1–4 | Philadelphia Flyers | Wells Fargo Center (18,435) | 42–26–11 | 95 |
| 80 | 7 | 7:30 pm | Pittsburgh Penguins | 3–4 OT | Ottawa Senators | Canadian Tire Centre (20,263) | 42–26–12 | 96 |
| 81 | 10 | 7:00 pm | New York Islanders | 3–1 | Pittsburgh Penguins | Consol Energy Center (18,673) | 42–27–12 | 96 |
| 82 | 11^{[A]} | 7:00 pm | Pittsburgh Penguins | 2–0 | Buffalo Sabres | First Niagara Center (19,070) | 43–27–12 | 98 |

Legend: = Win = Loss = OT/SO Loss
^{A} – Alternate Jersey

=== Season standings ===
Metropolitan Division
| Pos | Team | GP | W | L | OTL | ROW | GF | GA | GD | Pts |
|---|---|---|---|---|---|---|---|---|---|---|
| 1 | p – New York Rangers | 82 | 53 | 22 | 7 | 49 | 252 | 192 | +60 | 113 |
| 2 | x – Washington Capitals | 82 | 45 | 26 | 11 | 40 | 242 | 203 | +39 | 101 |
| 3 | x – New York Islanders | 82 | 47 | 28 | 7 | 40 | 252 | 230 | +22 | 101 |
| 4 | x – Pittsburgh Penguins | 82 | 43 | 27 | 12 | 39 | 221 | 210 | +11 | 98 |
| 5 | Columbus Blue Jackets | 82 | 42 | 35 | 5 | 33 | 236 | 250 | −14 | 89 |
| 6 | Philadelphia Flyers | 82 | 33 | 31 | 18 | 30 | 215 | 234 | −19 | 84 |
| 7 | New Jersey Devils | 82 | 32 | 36 | 14 | 27 | 181 | 216 | −35 | 78 |
| 8 | Carolina Hurricanes | 82 | 30 | 41 | 11 | 25 | 188 | 226 | −38 | 71 |

Source: National Hockey League
p – Clinched Presidents' Trophy; x – Clinched playoff spot

Eastern Conference Wild Card
| Pos | Div | Team | GP | W | L | OTL | ROW | GF | GA | GD | Pts |
|---|---|---|---|---|---|---|---|---|---|---|---|
| 1 | AT | x – Ottawa Senators | 82 | 43 | 26 | 13 | 37 | 238 | 215 | +23 | 99 |
| 2 | ME | x – Pittsburgh Penguins | 82 | 43 | 27 | 12 | 39 | 221 | 210 | +11 | 98 |
| 3 | AT | Boston Bruins | 82 | 41 | 27 | 14 | 37 | 213 | 211 | +2 | 96 |
| 4 | AT | Florida Panthers | 82 | 38 | 29 | 15 | 30 | 206 | 223 | −17 | 91 |
| 5 | ME | Columbus Blue Jackets | 82 | 42 | 35 | 5 | 33 | 236 | 250 | −14 | 89 |
| 6 | ME | Philadelphia Flyers | 82 | 33 | 31 | 18 | 30 | 215 | 234 | −19 | 84 |
| 7 | ME | New Jersey Devils | 82 | 32 | 36 | 14 | 27 | 181 | 216 | −35 | 78 |
| 8 | ME | Carolina Hurricanes | 82 | 30 | 41 | 11 | 25 | 188 | 226 | −38 | 71 |
| 9 | AT | Toronto Maple Leafs | 82 | 30 | 44 | 8 | 25 | 211 | 262 | −51 | 68 |
| 10 | AT | Buffalo Sabres | 82 | 23 | 51 | 8 | 15 | 161 | 274 | −113 | 54 |

Source: National Hockey League
x – Clinched playoff spot

=== Detailed records ===
Final

Eastern Conference
| Atlantic | GP | W | L | OT | SHOTS | GF | GA | PP | PK | FO W–L |
| Montreal Canadiens | 3 | 2 | 1 | 0 | 90–88 | 7 | 5 | 2–6 | 0–11 | 87–95 |
| Tampa Bay Lightning | 3 | 2 | 1 | 0 | 84–92 | 13 | 9 | 2–8 | 1–10 | 75–94 |
| Detroit Red Wings | 3 | 1 | 1 | 1 | 90–80 | 8 | 10 | 0–9 | 2–8 | 87–81 |
| Boston Bruins | 3 | 1 | 1 | 1 | 102–83 | 5 | 7 | 1–10 | 0–8 | 82–99 |
| Ottawa Senators | 3 | 2 | 0 | 1 | 90–106 | 11 | 10 | 1–9 | 2–11 | 82–108 |
| Florida Panthers | 3 | 2 | 0 | 1 | 87–118 | 11 | 6 | 2–13 | 1–12 | 110–94 |
| Toronto Maple Leafs | 3 | 3 | 0 | 0 | 107–83 | 11 | 6 | 4–11 | 2–14 | 110–93 |
| Buffalo Sabres | 3 | 3 | 0 | 0 | 111–67 | 13 | 1 | 5–10 | 0–7 | 94–79 |
| Division Total | 24 | 16 | 4 | 4 | 761–717 | 79 | 54 | 17–76 | 8–81 | 727–743 |

| Metropolitan | GP | W | L | OT | SHOTS | GF | GA | PP | PK | FO W–L |
|---|---|---|---|---|---|---|---|---|---|---|
| New York Islanders | 5 | 1 | 3 | 1 | 158–166 | 12 | 19 | 4–9 | 2–14 | 145–140 |
| New Jersey Devils | 5 | 3 | 2 | 0 | 162–108 | 12 | 9 | 4–15 | 1–14 | 138–126 |
| Washington Capitals | 4 | 1 | 3 | 0 | 117–127 | 5 | 13 | 1–17 | 4–19 | 105–136 |
| Pittsburgh Penguins | | | | | | | | | | |
| Columbus Blue Jackets | 4 | 1 | 2 | 1 | 143–117 | 12 | 14 | 3–15 | 2–15 | 125–132 |
| Philadelphia Flyers | 4 | 0 | 3 | 1 | 132–124 | 7 | 16 | 1–12 | 5–17 | 124–112 |
| New York Rangers | 4 | 1 | 2 | 1 | 140–126 | 8 | 16 | 1–9 | 3–18 | 119–114 |
| Carolina Hurricanes | 4 | 2 | 2 | 0 | 123–122 | 9 | 12 | 0–10 | 5–15 | 105–126 |
| Division Total | 30 | 9 | 17 | 4 | 975–890 | 65 | 99 | 14–87 | 22–112 | 861–886 |
| Conference Total | 54 | 25 | 21 | 8 | 1736–1607 | 144 | 153 | 31–163 | 30–193 | 1588–1629 |

Western Conference
| Central | GP | W | L | OT | SHOTS | GF | GA | PP | PK | FO W–L |
| Nashville Predators | 2 | 1 | 1 | 0 | 47–49 | 3 | 4 | 2–6 | 1–7 | 49–42 |
| Chicago Blackhawks | 2 | 0 | 0 | 2 | 72–58 | 3 | 5 | 0–4 | 1–4 | 54–66 |
| Dallas Stars | 2 | 0 | 2 | 0 | 61–54 | 3 | 5 | 3–8 | 1–8 | 56–69 |
| Minnesota Wild | 2 | 2 | 0 | 0 | 59–66 | 11 | 3 | 2–5 | 0–5 | 60–65 |
| St. Louis Blues | 2 | 1 | 0 | 1 | 55–58 | 6 | 5 | 1–6 | 0–1 | 56–67 |
| Colorado Avalanche | 2 | 1 | 1 | 0 | 77–51 | 2 | 3 | 0–3 | 1–5 | 58–62 |
| Winnipeg Jets | 2 | 2 | 0 | 0 | 65–59 | 9 | 6 | 2–8 | 0–4 | 55–54 |
| Division Total | 14 | 7 | 4 | 3 | 436–395 | 37 | 31 | 10–40 | 4–34 | 388–425 |

| Pacific | GP | W | L | OT | SHOTS | GF | GA | PP | PK | FO W–L |
|---|---|---|---|---|---|---|---|---|---|---|
| Anaheim Ducks | 2 | 2 | 0 | 0 | 60–58 | 11 | 6 | 1–8 | 3–9 | 69–71 |
| Los Angeles Kings | 2 | 2 | 0 | 0 | 41–67 | 4 | 0 | 2–10 | 0–6 | 59–58 |
| Calgary Flames | 2 | 2 | 0 | 0 | 52–48 | 7 | 1 | 0–8 | 0–9 | 53–51 |
| San Jose Sharks | 2 | 1 | 0 | 1 | 73–62 | 4 | 4 | 1–5 | 1–9 | 64–62 |
| Vancouver Canucks | 2 | 0 | 2 | 0 | 53–58 | 0 | 8 | 0–7 | 2–7 | 54–65 |
| Arizona Coyotes | 2 | 2 | 0 | 0 | 83–55 | 6 | 3 | 3–10 | 0–5 | 64–67 |
| Edmonton Oilers | 2 | 2 | 0 | 0 | 60–51 | 8 | 4 | 1–3 | 2–5 | 57–59 |
| Division Total | 14 | 11 | 2 | 1 | 422–399 | 40 | 26 | 8–51 | 8–50 | 420–433 |
| Conference Total | 28 | 18 | 6 | 4 | 858–794 | 77 | 57 | 18–91 | 12–84 | 808–858 |
| NHL Total | 82 | 43 | 27 | 12 | 2594–2401 | 221 | 210 | 49–254 | 42–277 | 2396–2487 |

=== Injuries ===
Final

| Player | Injury | Date | Returned | Games missed |
|---|---|---|---|---|
| Beau Bennett | Lower Body | October 9, 2014 | November 8, 2014 | 10 games |
| Robert Bortuzzo | Lower Body | October 9, 2014 | November 1, 2014 | 10 games |
| Olli Maatta | Thyroid Cancer | November 4, 2014 | November 15, 2014 | 6 games |
| Blake Comeau | Illness | November 14, 2014 | November 15, 2014 | 1 game |
| Pascal Dupuis | Blood Clot - Lung | November 18, 2014 | Remainder of season | 65 games |
| Beau Bennett | Lower Body, Mumps | November 26, 2014 | December 29, 2014 | 16 games |
| Kris Letang | Lower Body | November 29, 2014 | December 8, 2014 | 5 games |
| Marcel Goc | Foot | November 29, 2014 | December 2, 2014 | 2 games |
| Chris Kunitz | Foot | December 2, 2014 | December 18, 2014 | 8 games |
| Scott Wilson | Leg | December 4, 2014 | January 13, 2015 | 18 games |
| Patric Hornqvist | Upper Body | December 6, 2014 | December 8, 2014 | 2 games |
| Olli Maatta | Shoulder Surgery, Mumps | December 8, 2014 | – | 55 games |
| Sidney Crosby | Mumps | December 12, 2014 | December 15, 2014 | 3 games |
| Zach Sill | Upper Body | December 13, 2014 | January 3, 2015 | 11 games |
| Robert Bortuzzo | Upper Body | December 15, 2014 | December 23, 2014 | 5 games |
| Thomas Greiss | Mumps Testing | December 18, 2014 | December 19, 2014 | 1 game |
| Craig Adams | Undisclosed | December 20, 2014 | December 29, 2014 | 5 games |
| Christian Ehrhoff | Lower Body | December 20, 2014 | December 29, 2014 | 5 games |
| Paul Martin | Undisclosed | December 20, 2014 | January 3, 2015 | 8 games |
| Steve Downie | Mumps | December 22, 2014 | December 31, 2014 | 5 games |
| Thomas Greiss | Mumps | December 22, 2014 | December 27, 2014 | 3 games |
| Brandon Sutter | Mumps Testing | December 22, 2014 | December 23, 2014 | 2 games |
| Blake Comeau | Upper Body | December 23, 2014 | February 11, 2015 | 20 games |
| Patric Hornqvist | Lower Body | December 29, 2014 | January 27, 2015 | 11 games |
| Marcel Goc | Illness | January 7, 2015 | January 10, 2015 | 1 game |
| Simon Despres | Illness | January 20, 2015 | January 27, 2015 | 2 games |
| Kris Letang | Concussion | January 21, 2015 | January 27, 2015 | 1 game |
| Evgeni Malkin | Lower Body | January 21, 2015 | February 4, 2015 | 5 games |
| Sidney Crosby | Lower Body | January 27, 2015 | January 28, 2015 | 1 game |
| Christian Ehrhoff | Concussion | January 28, 2015 | February 25, 2015 | 12 games |
| Christian Ehrhoff | Concussion | March 1, 2015 | March 14, 2015 | 6 games |
| Sidney Crosby | Illness | March 14, 2015 | March 15, 2015 | 1 game |
| Evgeni Malkin | Lower Body | March 14, 2015 | March 28, 2015 | 6 games |
| Patric Hornqvist | Lower Body | March 15, 2015 | March 28, 2015 | 5 games |
| Christian Ehrhoff | Undisclosed | March 21, 2015 | March 24, 2015 | 1 game |
| Christian Ehrhoff | Concussion | March 24, 2015 | – | 9 games |
| David Perron | Illness | March 28, 2015 | March 29, 2015 | 1 game |
| Kris Letang | Concussion | March 28, 2015 | – | 7 games |
| Evgeni Malkin | Undisclosed | April 1, 2015 | April 5, 2015 | 2 games |
| Steve Downie | Upper Body | April 4, 2015 | April 10, 2015 | 2 games |
| Derrick Pouliot | Upper Body | April 7, 2015 | – | 2 games |
| Total | | | | 341 games |

=== Suspensions/fines ===
| Player | Explanation | Length | Salary | Date issued |
|---|---|---|---|---|
| Robert Bortuzzo | Interference against New Jersey Devils forward Jaromir Jagr during NHL Game No. 364 in Pittsburgh on Tuesday, December 2, 2014, at 17:57 of the second period. | 2 games | $6,451.62 | December 3, 2014 |

== Playoffs ==
=== Game log ===
The Pittsburgh Penguins entered the playoffs as the final Wild Card team.

2015 Stanley Cup Playoffs
Eastern Conference First Round vs. New York Rangers: New York won 4–1

| # | Date | Visitor | Score | Home | OT | Decision | Attendance | Series | Recap |
|---|---|---|---|---|---|---|---|---|---|
| 1 | April 16 | Pittsburgh | 1–2 | New York | | Fleury | 18,006 | 0–1 | Recap |
| 2 | April 18 | Pittsburgh | 4–3 | New York | | Fleury | 18,006 | 1–1 | Recap |
| 3 | April 20 | New York | 2–1 | Pittsburgh | | Fleury | 18,645 | 1–2 | Recap |
| 4 | April 22 | New York | 2–1 | Pittsburgh | OT | Fleury | 18,619 | 1–3 | Recap |
| 5 | April 24 | Pittsburgh | 1–2 | New York | OT | Fleury | 18,006 | 1–4 | Recap |

Legend: = If needed = Win = Loss = Playoff series win

=== Injuries ===
Final

| Player | Injury | Date | Returned | Games missed |
|---|---|---|---|---|
| Pascal Dupuis | Blood Clot - Lung | From season | – | 5 games |
| Olli Maatta | Upper Body - Shoulder | From season | – | 5 games |
| Christian Ehrhoff | Concussion | From season | – | 5 games |
| Kris Letang | Concussion | From season | – | 5 games |
| Derrick Pouliot | Upper Body | From season | – | 5 games |
| Beau Bennett | Upper Body | April 18, 2015 | – | 5 games |
| Total | | | | 28 games |

== Player statistics ==
Skaters

Regular season
| Player | GP | G | A | Pts | +/− | PIM |
|---|---|---|---|---|---|---|
| Sidney Crosby | 77 | 28 | 56 | 84 | 5 | 47 |
| Evgeni Malkin | 69 | 28 | 42 | 70 | -2 | 60 |
| Kris Letang | 69 | 11 | 43 | 54 | 12 | 79 |
| Patric Hornqvist | 64 | 25 | 26 | 51 | 12 | 38 |
| Chris Kunitz | 74 | 17 | 23 | 40 | 2 | 56 |
| Brandon Sutter | 80 | 21 | 12 | 33 | 6 | 14 |
| Blake Comeau | 61 | 16 | 15 | 31 | 6 | 65 |
| Steve Downie | 72 | 14 | 14 | 28 | 2 | 238 |
| Nick Spaling | 82 | 9 | 18 | 27 | -2 | 26 |
| David Perron^{†} | 43 | 12 | 10 | 22 | -8 | 42 |
| Paul Martin | 74 | 3 | 17 | 20 | 17 | 20 |
| Simon Despres^{‡} | 59 | 2 | 15 | 17 | 9 | 64 |
| Christian Ehrhoff | 49 | 3 | 11 | 14 | 8 | 26 |
| Beau Bennett | 49 | 4 | 8 | 12 | -1 | 16 |
| Pascal Dupuis | 16 | 6 | 5 | 11 | 2 | 4 |
| Rob Scuderi | 82 | 1 | 9 | 10 | 9 | 17 |
| Daniel Winnik^{†} | 21 | 2 | 7 | 9 | 8 | 8 |
| Olli Maatta | 20 | 1 | 8 | 9 | 1 | 10 |
| Ian Cole^{†} | 20 | 1 | 7 | 8 | -2 | 7 |
| Derrick Pouliot | 34 | 2 | 5 | 7 | -11 | 4 |
| Craig Adams | 70 | 1 | 6 | 7 | -1 | 44 |
| Marcel Goc^{‡} | 43 | 2 | 4 | 6 | -2 | 4 |
| Robert Bortuzzo^{‡} | 38 | 2 | 4 | 6 | -6 | 68 |
| Andrew Ebbett | 24 | 1 | 5 | 6 | 1 | 2 |
| Ben Lovejoy^{†} | 20 | 1 | 2 | 3 | -7 | 8 |
| Rob Klinkhammer^{†‡} | 10 | 1 | 2 | 3 | 0 | 0 |
| Zach Sill^{‡} | 42 | 1 | 2 | 3 | -3 | 60 |
| Bryan Rust | 14 | 1 | 1 | 2 | -3 | 4 |
| Maxim Lapierre^{†} | 35 | 0 | 2 | 2 | -13 | 16 |
| Mark Arcobello^{†‡} | 10 | 0 | 2 | 2 | 1 | 2 |
| Brian Dumoulin | 8 | 1 | 0 | 1 | 0 | 2 |
| Jayson Megna | 12 | 0 | 1 | 1 | -2 | 14 |
| Taylor Chorney | 7 | 0 | 0 | 0 | -1 | 0 |
| Scott Wilson | 1 | 0 | 0 | 0 | 0 | 0 |
| Dominik Uher | 2 | 0 | 0 | 0 | -1 | 0 |
| Scott Harrington | 10 | 0 | 0 | 0 | -10 | 4 |
| Bobby Farnham | 11 | 0 | 0 | 0 | 0 | 24 |
| Total | | 217 | 382 | 599 | — | 1,093 |

Playoffs
| Player | GP | G | A | Pts | +/− | PIM |
|---|---|---|---|---|---|---|
| Sidney Crosby | 5 | 2 | 2 | 4 | 1 | 0 |
| Patric Hornqvist | 5 | 2 | 1 | 3 | 1 | 2 |
| Chris Kunitz | 5 | 1 | 2 | 3 | 2 | 8 |
| Brandon Sutter | 5 | 1 | 1 | 2 | -1 | 2 |
| Nick Spaling | 5 | 1 | 1 | 2 | 1 | 4 |
| Paul Martin | 5 | 0 | 2 | 2 | -3 | 2 |
| Steve Downie | 5 | 0 | 2 | 2 | 1 | 4 |
| Ben Lovejoy | 5 | 0 | 2 | 2 | -3 | 0 |
| Ian Cole | 5 | 0 | 2 | 2 | 0 | 8 |
| Blake Comeau | 5 | 1 | 0 | 1 | 0 | 8 |
| David Perron | 5 | 0 | 1 | 1 | -1 | 4 |
| Rob Scuderi | 5 | 0 | 0 | 0 | 0 | 0 |
| Maxim Lapierre | 5 | 0 | 0 | 0 | -2 | 0 |
| Evgeni Malkin | 5 | 0 | 0 | 0 | -1 | 0 |
| Daniel Winnik | 5 | 0 | 0 | 0 | -6 | 2 |
| Taylor Chorney | 5 | 0 | 0 | 0 | 0 | 2 |
| Brian Dumoulin | 5 | 0 | 0 | 0 | 1 | 0 |
| Beau Bennett | 2 | 0 | 0 | 0 | 0 | 0 |
| Scott Wilson | 3 | 0 | 0 | 0 | 0 | 0 |
| Total | | 8 | 16 | 24 | — | 46 |

Goaltenders

Regular season
| Player | GP | GS | TOI | W | L | OT | GA | GAA | SA | SV% | SO | G | A | PIM |
|---|---|---|---|---|---|---|---|---|---|---|---|---|---|---|
| Marc-Andre Fleury | 64 | 64 | 3776:59 | 34 | 20 | 9 | 146 | 2.32 | 1831 | 0.920 | 10 | 0 | 1 | 6 |
| Thomas Greiss | 20 | 18 | 1159:37 | 9 | 6 | 3 | 50 | 2.59 | 546 | 0.908 | 0 | 0 | 0 | 0 |
| Jeff Zatkoff | 1 | 0 | 36:45 | 0 | 1 | 0 | 1 | 1.63 | 17 | 0.941 | 0 | 0 | 0 | 0 |
| Total | | 82 | 4973:21 | 43 | 27 | 12 | 197 | 2.38 | 2394 | 0.918 | 10 | 0 | 1 | 6 |

Playoffs
| Player | GP | GS | TOI | W | L | OT | GA | GAA | SA | SV% | SO | G | A | PIM |
|---|---|---|---|---|---|---|---|---|---|---|---|---|---|---|
| Marc-Andre Fleury | 5 | 5 | 311:44 | 1 | 4 | -- | 11 | 2.12 | 150 | 0.927 | 0 | 0 | 0 | 0 |
| Total | | 5 | 311:44 | 1 | 4 | 0 | 11 | 2.12 | 150 | 0.927 | 0 | 0 | 0 | 0 |

^{†}Denotes player spent time with another team before joining the Penguins. Stats reflect time with the Penguins only.
^{‡}Denotes player was traded mid-season. Stats reflect time with the Penguins only.

== Notable achievements ==
=== Awards ===
Regular season
| Player | Award | Awarded |
|---|---|---|
| S. Crosby | NHL Third Star of the Week | October 13, 2014 |
| M. Fleury | NHL Third Star of the Week | November 3, 2014 |
| S. Crosby | NHL Second Star of the Month | November 3, 2014 |
| M. Fleury | NHL Third Star of the Week | December 22, 2014 |
| S. Crosby | NHL All-Star game selection | January 10, 2015 |
| E. Malkin | NHL All-Star game selection | January 10, 2015 |
| M. Fleury | NHL All-Star game replacement selection | January 15, 2015 |
| E. Malkin | NHL Third Star of the Week | March 2, 2015 |

=== Team awards ===
Awarded week of April 5

| Player | Award | Notes |
|---|---|---|
| Kris Letang | Bill Masterton Memorial Trophy nominee | The Pittsburgh Chapter of the Professional Hockey Writers Association votes for the Penguins' Masterton nominee. Each NHL team selects a Masterton candidate from which the overall winner is chosen. The Masterton candidate is nominated as the player who best exemplifies the qualities of perseverance, sportsmanship and dedication to hockey. Sponsor: Trib Total Media |
| Derrick Pouliot | Rookie of the Year Award | Presented in memory of former Penguins forward Michel Briere to the player who makes a substantial contribution during his rookie season. Sponsor: Highmark |
| Marc-Andre Fleury | Player's Player Award | The players hold a vote at the end of the season for the player they feel exemplifies leadership for the team, both on and off the ice, a player dedicated to teamwork. Sponsor: American Eagle Outfitters |
| Paul Martin | Edward J. DeBartolo Award | The award recognizes the player who has donated a tremendous amount of time and effort during the season working on community and charity projects. Sponsor: Verizon Wireless |
| Kris Letang | Defensive Player of the Year | This award honors the defensive skills of an individual player on the team. Sponsor: PNC Wealth Management |
| Marc-Andre Fleury | Most Valuable Player | Based on the overall contribution the player makes to the team. Sponsor: CONSOL Energy |

=== Milestones ===
Regular season
| Player | Milestone | Reached |
|---|---|---|
| M. Johnston | 1st career NHL win (coach) | October 9, 2014 |
| N. Spaling | 300th Career NHL Game | October 13, 2014 |
| S. Crosby | 500th Career NHL Assist | October 18, 2014 |
| P. Dupuis | 400th Career NHL Point | October 25, 2014 |
| C. Ehrhoff | 700th Career NHL Game | October 28, 2014 |
| E. Malkin | 400th Career NHL Assist | October 30, 2014 |
| M. Fleury | 30th Career NHL Shutout | October 30, 2014 |
| S. Despres | 100th Career NHL Game | November 14, 2014 |
| C. Adams | 900th Career NHL Game | November 22, 2014 |
| C. Adams | 100th Career NHL Assist | November 24, 2014 |
| M. Fleury | 300th Career NHL Win | November 24, 2014 |
| S. Crosby | 800th Career NHL Point | November 26, 2014 |
| S. Wilson | 1st Career NHL Game | December 2, 2014 |
| C. Adams | 314th Consecutive Game^{[See note]} | December 6, 2014 |
| B. Comeau | 100th Career NHL Assist | December 8, 2014 |
| B. Farnham | 1st Career NHL Game | December 13, 2014 |
| B. Rust | 1st Career NHL Game | December 13, 2014 |
| B. Rust | 1st Career NHL Goal; 1st Career NHL Point | December 15, 2014 |
| B. Dumoulin | 1st Career NHL Goal | December 15, 2014 |
| S. Harrington | 1st Career NHL Game | December 18, 2014 |
| D. Pouliot | 1st Career NHL Game; 1st Career NHL Goal; 1st Career NHL Point | December 20, 2014 |
| D. Pouliot | 1st Career NHL Assist | December 22, 2014 |
| D. Uher | 1st Career NHL Game | December 23, 2014 |
| B. Rust | 1st Career NHL Assist | January 2, 2015 |
| N. Spaling | 100th Career NHL Point | January 2, 2015 |
| M. Goc | 600th Career NHL Game | January 10, 2015 |
| Z. Sill | 1st Career NHL Assist; 1st Career NHL Point | January 12, 2015 |
| C. Kunitz | 500th Career NHL Point | January 20, 2015 |
| Z. Sill | 1st Career NHL Goal | January 21, 2015 |
| K. Letang | 200th Career NHL Assist | January 27, 2015 |
| R. Bortuzzo | 100th Career NHL Game | January 28, 2015 |
| C. Kunitz | 700th Career NHL Game | January 30, 2015 |
| P. Hornqvist | 400th Career NHL Game | February 1, 2015 |
| M. Fleury | 8th Shutout Game (Season)^{[See note]} | February 6, 2015 |
| S. Crosby | 600th Career NHL Game | February 11, 2015 |
| R. Scuderi | 700th Career NHL Game | March 1, 2015 |
| E. Malkin | 700th Career NHL Point | March 12, 2015 |
| M. Lapierre | 600th Career NHL Game | March 14, 2015 |
| S. Downie | 400th Career NHL Game | March 21, 2015 |
| S. Crosby | 300th Career NHL Goal | April 1, 2015 |
| R. Scuderi | 100th Career NHL Point | April 10, 2015 |

- ^{Note} Franchise Record

Playoffs
| Player | Milestone | Reached |
|---|---|---|
| B. Dumoulin | 1st Career Playoff Game | April 16, 2015 |
| T. Chorney | 1st Career Playoff Game | April 16, 2015 |
| B. Comeau | 1st Career Playoff Goal; 1st Career Playoff Point | April 16, 2015 |
| I. Cole | 1st Career Playoff Assist; 1st Career Playoff Point | April 18, 2015 |
| S. Wilson | 1st Career Playoff Game | April 20, 2015 |
| E. Malkin | 100th Career Playoff Game | April 22, 2015 |
| S. Crosby | 100th Career Playoff Game | April 24, 2015 |

== Transactions ==
The Penguins have been involved in the following transactions during the 2014–15 season:

=== Trades ===
| June 27, 2014 | To Nashville Predators James Neal | To Pittsburgh Penguins Patric Hornqvist; Nick Spaling |
| December 5, 2014 | To Arizona Coyotes Philip Samuelsson | To Pittsburgh Penguins Rob Klinkhammer conditional 5th-round pick in 2016 |
| January 2, 2015 | To Edmonton Oilers Rob Klinkhammer; 1st-round pick in 2015 (To NYI–#16–Mathew Barzal) | To Pittsburgh Penguins David Perron |
| January 27, 2015 | To St. Louis Blues Marcel Goc | To Pittsburgh Penguins Maxim Lapierre |
| February 25, 2015 | To Toronto Maple Leafs Zach Sill; 2nd-round pick in 2016; 4th-round pick in 2015 (To EDM to OTT–#107–Christian Wolanin) | To Pittsburgh Penguins Daniel Winnik |
| March 2, 2015 | To St. Louis Blues Robert Bortuzzo; 7th-round pick in 2016 | To Pittsburgh Penguins Ian Cole |
| March 2, 2015 | To Anaheim Ducks Simon Despres | To Pittsburgh Penguins Ben Lovejoy |

=== Free agents ===
| Player | Acquired from | Lost to | Date | Contract terms |
|---|---|---|---|---|
| Jussi Jokinen | | Florida Panthers | July 1, 2014 | 4-year/$16 million |
| Christian Ehrhoff | Buffalo Sabres | | July 1, 2014 | 1 year/$4 million |
| Blake Comeau | Columbus Blue Jackets | | July 1, 2014 | 1 year/$700,000 |
| Thomas Greiss | Arizona Coyotes | | July 1, 2014 | 1 year/$1 million |
| Tanner Glass | | New York Rangers | July 1, 2014 | 3-year/$4.35 million |
| Brooks Orpik | | Washington Capitals | July 1, 2014 | 5-year/$27.5 million |
| Deryk Engelland | | Calgary Flames | July 1, 2014 | 3-year/$8.7 million |
| Matt Niskanen | | Washington Capitals | July 1, 2014 | 7-year/$40.25 million |
| Taylor Chorney | St. Louis Blues | | July 1, 2014 | 1 year/$550,000^{[a]} |
| Chris Conner | | Washington Capitals | July 1, 2014 | 1 year/$550,000^{[a]} |
| Harry Zolnierczyk | | New York Islanders | July 1, 2014 | 1 year/$600,000^{[a]} |
| Joe Vitale | | Arizona Coyotes | July 1, 2014 | 3-year/$3.35 million |
| Chuck Kobasew | | SC Bern | July 2, 2014 | 2 years |
| Steve Downie | Philadelphia Flyers | | July 2, 2014 | 1 year/$1 million |
| Brian Gibbons | | Columbus Blue Jackets | July 4, 2014 | 1 year/$750,000^{[a]} |
| Lee Stempniak | | New York Rangers | July 19, 2014 | 1 year/$900,000 |
| Taylor Pyatt | | Genève-Servette HC | July 24, 2014 | 1 year |
| Daniel Carcillo | New York Rangers | | September 4, 2014 | Professional Tryout Contract |
| Brendan Mikkelson | | Toronto Maple Leafs | September 28, 2014 | Minor league contract |

=== Waivers ===
| Player | Claimed from | Lost to | Date |
|---|---|---|---|
| Mark Arcobello | Nashville Predators | | January 14, 2015 |
| Mark Arcobello | | Arizona Coyotes | February 11, 2015 |

=== Signings ===
| Player | Date | Contract terms |
|---|---|---|
| Nick Drazenovic | July 1, 2014 | 1 year/$550,000^{[a]} |
| Marcel Goc | July 1, 2014 | 1 year/$1.2 million |
| Zach Sill | July 3, 2014 | 1 year/$550,000^{[a]} |
| Jayson Megna | July 10, 2014 | 1 year/$874,125^{[a]} |
| Philip Samuelsson | July 10, 2014 | 1 year/$550,000^{[a]} |
| Kasperi Kapanen | July 11, 2014 | 3 years/$2.775 million^{[b]} |
| Bobby Farnham | July 15, 2014 | 1 year/$550,000^{[a]} |
| Simon Despres | July 18, 2014 | 2 years/$1.8 million |
| Nick Spaling | July 31, 2014 | 2 years/$4.4 million |
| Brandon Sutter | August 5, 2014 | 2 years/$6.6 million |
| Marc-Andre Fleury | November 5, 2014 | 4 years/$23 million contract extension |

=== Other ===
| Name | Date | Details |
|---|---|---|
| Gary Agnew | July 10, 2014 | Named as Assistant Coach |
| Mark Recchi | July 18, 2014 | Named as Player Development Coach |
| Jacques Martin | July 23, 2014 | Named as Senior Advisor of Hockey Operations |
| Daniel Carcillo | October 2, 2014 | Released |
| Jeff Zatkoff | October 4, 2014 | Waived |
| Tomas Vokoun | December 15, 2014 | Retirement |

Notes

- ^{a} – Two-way contract
- ^{b} – Entry-level contract

== Draft picks ==
The 2014 NHL entry draft was held on June 27–28, 2014 at the Wells Fargo Center in Philadelphia, Pennsylvania.

| Round | # | Player | Pos | Nationality | College/Junior/Club team (League) |
|---|---|---|---|---|---|
| 1 | 22 | Kasperi Kapanen | RW | Finland | KalPa (SM-liiga) |
| 4 | 113 | Sam Lafferty | C/LW | United States | Deerfield Academy (USHS–MA) |
| 5 | 145^{[a]} | Anthony Angello | C | United States | Omaha Lancers (USHL) |
| 6 | 173 | Jaden Lindo | RW | Canada | Owen Sound Attack (OHL) |
| 7 | 203 | Jeff Taylor | D | United States | Union College (ECAC) |

Draft notes

- The Pittsburgh Penguins' second-round pick went to the San Jose Sharks as the result of a March 25, 2013 trade that sent Douglas Murray to the Penguins in exchange for a 2013 second-round pick (#58–Tyler Bertuzzi) and this conditional pick.
  - Condition – Second-round pick if Penguins advance to third round of 2013 playoffs or if Murray re-signs with Penguins for 2013–14 season, else third-round pick. Converted to second-round pick when Penguins advanced to the 2013 Eastern Conference Finals.
- The Pittsburgh Penguins' third-round pick went to the Calgary Flames as the result of a March 5, 2014 trade that sent Lee Stempniak to the Penguins in exchange for this pick.
- The Pittsburgh Penguins' fifth-round pick went to the Florida Panthers as the result of a March 5, 2014 trade that sent Marcel Goc to the Penguins in exchange for this pick.
- ^{a} The Anaheim Ducks fifth-round pick went to the Pittsburgh Penguins as a result of a February 6, 2013 trade that sent Ben Lovejoy to the Ducks in exchange for this pick.
