= 2014–15 Nashville Predators season =

Professional ice hockey team season

2014–15 Nashville Predators
- Division: 2nd Central
- Conference: 3rd Western
- 2014–15 record: 47–25–10
- Home record: 28–9–4
- Road record: 19–16–6
- Goals for: 232
- Goals against: 208

Team information
- General manager: David Poile
- Coach: Peter Laviolette
- Captain: Shea Weber
- Alternate captains: Mike Fisher; James Neal
- Arena: Bridgestone Arena
- Average attendance: 16,854 (41 games)

Team leaders
- Goals: Filip Forsberg (26)
- Assists: Mike Ribeiro (47)
- Points: Filip Forsberg (63)
- Penalty minutes: Shea Weber (70)
- Plus/minus: Colin Wilson (+21)
- Wins: Pekka Rinne (39)
- Goals against average: Pekka Rinne (2.08)

The 2014–15 Nashville Predators season was the 17th season for the National Hockey League (NHL) franchise that was established on June 25, 1997.

== Off-season ==
The day after the end of the Predators' 2013–14 season, where the team missed the Stanley Cup playoffs for the second-straight year, it was announced that after 17 years at the helm of the Nashville Predators, Barry Trotz was relieved of his duties as head coach.

On May 6, 2014, it was announced that Peter Laviolette, former head coach of the Philadelphia Flyers, was hired to replace Trotz as the new head coach of the Predators. The team also hired Kevin McCarthy as an assistant coach.

On June 27, 2014, during the first round of the 2014 NHL entry draft, the Predators traded right winger Patric Hornqvist and restricted free agent Nick Spaling to the Pittsburgh Penguins in exchange for right winger James Neal.

== Playoffs ==
The Nashville Predators entered the playoffs as the Central Division's second seed. They lost to the Chicago Blackhawks in six games in the first round.

== Standings ==
Central Division
Pos	Team	GP	W	L	OTL	ROW	GF	GA	GD	Pts
1	y – St. Louis Blues	82	51	24	7	42	248	201	+47	109
2	x – Nashville Predators	82	47	25	10	41	232	208	+24	104
3	x – Chicago Blackhawks	82	48	28	6	39	229	189	+40	102
4	x – Minnesota Wild	82	46	28	8	42	231	201	+30	100
5	x – Winnipeg Jets	82	43	26	13	36	230	210	+20	99
6	Dallas Stars	82	41	31	10	37	261	260	+1	92
7	Colorado Avalanche	82	39	31	12	29	219	227	−8	90

Source: National Hockey League
x – Clinched playoff spot; y – Clinched division

== Suspensions/fines ==
Player	Explanation	Length	Salary	Date issued
Anton Volchenkov	Illegal check to the head of Calgary Flames forward Micheal Ferland during NHL Game No. 151 in Calgary on Friday, October 31, 2014, at 19:06 of the second period.	4 games	$21,505.36	November 2, 2014
James Neal	Diving/Embellishment during NHL Game No. 447 in San Jose on Saturday, December 13, 2014, at 19:39 of the third period.	—	$2,000.00	December 17, 2014
Craig Smith	High-sticking on Buffalo Sabres forward Jerry D'Amigo during NHL Game No. 1075 in Nashville on Saturday, March 21, 2015, at 17:50 of the first period.	—	$5,000.00	March 22, 2015

== Schedule and results ==
=== Pre-season ===
2014 Pre-Season game log: 3–3–0 (home: 3–1–0; road: 0–2–0)
#	Date	Visitor	Score	Home	OT	Decision	Attendance	Record	Recap
1	September 23	Nashville	2–4	Tampa Bay		Mazanec	10,442	0–1–0	Recap
2	September 25	Tampa Bay	0–1	Nashville		Rinne	13,107	1–1–0	Recap
3	September 27	Florida	1–2	Nashville	SO	Hutton	12,700	2–1–0	Recap
4	September 27	Florida	1–4	Nashville		Rinne	15,741	3–1–0	Recap
5	September 29	Columbus	3–0	Nashville		Rinne	11,905	3–2–0	Recap
6	October 4	Nashville	2–3	Columbus		Rinne	14,786	3–3–0	Recap

=== Regular season ===
2014–15 game log

October: 6–2–2 (home: 4–1–1; road: 2–1–1)
#	Date	Visitor	Score	Home	OT	Decision	Attendance	Record	Pts	Recap
1	October 9	Ottawa	2–3	Nashville		Rinne	17,113	1–0–0	2	Recap
2	October 11	Dallas	1–4	Nashville		Rinne	17,113	2–0–0	4	Recap
3	October 14	Calgary	3–2	Nashville	SO	Rinne	15,654	2–0–1	5	Recap
4	October 17	Nashville	2–0	Winnipeg		Rinne	15,016	3–0–1	7	Recap
5	October 18	Nashville	1–2	Chicago	OT	Hutton	21,640	3–0–2	8	Recap
6	October 21	Arizona	3–4	Nashville	SO	Rinne	15,694	4–0–2	10	Recap
7	October 23	Chicago	2–3	Nashville		Rinne	17,157	5–0–2	12	Recap
8	October 25	Pittsburgh	3–0	Nashville		Rinne	17,218	5–1–2	12	Recap
9	October 29	Nashville	4–1	Edmonton		Rinne	16,839	6–1–2	14	Recap
10	October 31	Nashville	3–4	Calgary		Rinne	18,505	6–2–2	14	Recap

November: 10–3–0 (home: 6–0–0; road: 4–3–0)
#	Date	Visitor	Score	Home	OT	Decision	Attendance	Record	Pts	Recap
11	November 2	Nashville	3–1	Vancouver		Rinne	18,395	7–2–2	16	Recap
12	November 4	Nashville	1–3	Winnipeg		Hutton	15,016	7–3–2	16	Recap
13	November 6	Nashville	3–2	Dallas		Rinne	17,054	8–3–2	18	Recap
14	November 8	Nashville	2–1	St. Louis		Rinne	18,869	9–3–2	20	Recap
15	November 11	Edmonton	2–3	Nashville		Rinne	17,129	10–3–2	22	Recap
16	November 13	Nashville	3–4	St. Louis		Rinne	15,702	10–4–2	22	Recap
17	November 15	Winnipeg	1–2	Nashville		Rinne	17,113	11–4–2	24	Recap
18	November 18	Nashville	9–2	Toronto		Rinne	19,007	12–4–2	26	Recap
19	November 20	Nashville	2–3	Ottawa		Hutton	16,796	12–5–2	26	Recap
20	November 22	Florida	2–3	Nashville	SO	Rinne	17,163	13–5–2	28	Recap
21	November 25	Los Angeles	3–4	Nashville	SO	Rinne	17,181	14–5–2	30	Recap
22	November 27	Edmonton	0–1	Nashville	OT	Rinne	17,113	15–5–2	32	Recap
23	November 29	Columbus	1–2	Nashville		Rinne	16,548	16–5–2	34	Recap

December: 8–4–1 (home: 4–1–0; road: 4–3–1)
#	Date	Visitor	Score	Home	OT	Decision	Attendance	Record	Pts	Recap
24	December 2	Nashville	1–2	Carolina		Rinne	9,161	16–6–2	34	Recap
25	December 4	St. Louis	3–4	Nashville		Rinne	16,409	17–6–2	36	Recap
26	December 6	Chicago	3–1	Nashville		Rinne	17,212	17–7–2	36	Recap
27	December 9	Nashville	3–0	Colorado		Rinne	12,689	18–7–2	38	Recap
28	December 11	Nashville	5–1	Arizona		Rinne	10,194	19–7–2	40	Recap
29	December 13	Nashville	0–2	San Jose		Rinne	17,059	19–8–2	40	Recap
30	December 16	Boston	2–3	Nashville	SO	Rinne	17,113	20–8–2	42	Recap
31	December 20	Nashville	6–5	Minnesota	OT	Rinne	19,017	21–8–2	44	Recap
32	December 22	Nashville	5–1	Columbus		Rinne	14,573	22–8–2	46	Recap
33	December 23	Nashville	3–5	Boston		Hutton	17,565	22–9–2	46	Recap
34	December 27	Philadelphia	1–4	Nashville		Rinne	17,315	23–9–2	48	Recap
35	December 29	Nashville	4–5	Chicago	SO	Rinne	22,208	23–9–3	49	Recap
36	December 30	St. Louis	2–3	Nashville		Rinne	17,401	24–9–3	51	Recap

January: 7–2–3 (home: 5–0–0; road: 2–2–3)
#	Date	Visitor	Score	Home	OT	Decision	Attendance	Record	Pts	Recap
37	January 3	Nashville	7–6	Los Angeles	OT	Rinne	18,230	25–9–3	53	Recap
38	January 4	Nashville	3–4	Anaheim	SO	Hutton	16,402	25–9–4	54	Recap
39	January 6	Carolina	2–3	Nashville		Rinne	15,706	26–9–4	56	Recap
40	January 8	Dallas	2–3	Nashville		Rinne	17,113	27–9–4	58	Recap
41	January 10	Nashville	3–1	Minnesota		Rinne	19,052	28–9–4	60	Recap
42	January 13	Vancouver	1–5	Nashville		Rinne	15,726	29–9–4	62	Recap
43	January 16	Washington	3–4	Nashville		Hutton	17,303	30–9–4	64	Recap
44	January 17	Nashville	2–5	Detroit		Hutton	20,027	30–10–4	64	Recap
45	January 20	Nashville	1–2	Montreal	OT	Hutton	21,287	30–10–5	65	Recap
46	January 27	Colorado	3–4	Nashville	OT	Hutton	15,566	31–10–5	67	Recap
47	January 29	Nashville	4–5	St. Louis	SO	Hutton	19,477	31–10–6	68	Recap
48	January 30	Nashville	0–3	Colorado		Mazanec	18,064	31–11–6	68	Recap

February: 10–4–1 (home: 7–3–0; road: 3–1–1)
#	Date	Visitor	Score	Home	OT	Decision	Attendance	Record	Pts	Recap
49	February 1	Nashville	4–0	Pittsburgh		Hutton	18,535	32–11–6	70	Recap
50	February 3	Toronto	3–4	Nashville		Hutton	15,667	33–11–6	72	Recap
51	February 5	Anaheim	5–2	Nashville		Rinne	17,113	33–12–6	72	Recap
52	February 7	NY Rangers	2–3	Nashville		Rinne	17,329	34–12–6	74	Recap
53	February 8	Nashville	3–2	Florida		Hutton	10,844	35–12–6	76	Recap
54	February 10	Tampa Bay	2–3	Nashville	OT	Rinne	16,362	36–12–6	78	Recap
55	February 12	Winnipeg	1–3	Nashville		Rinne	16,135	37–12–6	80	Recap
56	February 14	New Jersey	1–3	Nashville		Rinne	17,333	38–12–6	82	Recap
57	February 17	San Jose	1–5	Nashville		Rinne	16,206	39–12–6	84	Recap
58	February 19	Nashville	2–5	NY Islanders		Rinne	16,170	39–13–6	84	Recap
59	February 21	Nashville	2–3	Philadelphia	SO	Rinne	19,680	39–13–7	85	Recap
60	February 22	Nashville	2–1	Buffalo	SO	Hutton	19,070	40–13–7	87	Recap
61	February 24	Colorado	2–5	Nashville		Rinne	17,113	41–13–7	89	Recap
62	February 26	Minnesota	4–2	Nashville		Rinne	17,113	41–14–7	89	Recap
63	February 28	Detroit	4–3	Nashville		Rinne	17,361	41–15–7	89	Recap

March: 6–7–2 (home: 2–3–2; road: 4–4–0)
#	Date	Visitor	Score	Home	OT	Decision	Attendance	Record	Pts	Recap
64	March 2	Nashville	1–4	NY Rangers		Rinne	18,006	41–16–7	89	Recap
65	March 3	Nashville	1–3	New Jersey		Hutton	13,012	41–17–7	89	Recap
66	March 5	NY Islanders	4–3	Nashville		Rinne	17,113	41–18–7	89	Recap
67	March 7	Winnipeg	3–1	Nashville		Rinne	17,113	41–19–7	89	Recap
68	March 9	Nashville	2–1	Arizona	OT	Rinne	11,227	42–19–7	91	Recap
69	March 12	Nashville	0–2	San Jose		Rinne	17,562	42–20–7	91	Recap
70	March 14	Nashville	2–1	Los Angeles		Rinne	18,230	43–20–7	93	Recap
71	March 15	Nashville	2–4	Anaheim		Rinne	17,295	43–21–7	93	Recap
72	March 17	Minnesota	3–2	Nashville	OT	Rinne	17,209	43–21–8	94	Recap
73	March 21	Buffalo	0–3	Nashville		Rinne	17,113	44–21–8	96	Recap
74	March 24	Montreal	2–3	Nashville	OT	Rinne	17,113	45–21–8	98	Recap
75	March 26	Nashville	3–2	Tampa Bay		Rinne	19,204	46–21–8	100	Recap
76	March 28	Nashville	4–3	Washington		Rinne	18,506	47–21–8	102	Recap
77	March 29	Calgary	5–2	Nashville		Rinne	17,113	47–22–8	102	Recap
78	March 31	Vancouver	5–4	Nashville	SO	Rinne	17,113	47–22–9	103	Recap

April: 0–3–1 (home: 0–1–1; road: 0–2–0)
#	Date	Visitor	Score	Home	OT	Decision	Attendance	Record	Pts	Recap
79	April 4	Dallas	4–3	Nashville	OT	Rinne	17,113	47–22–10	104	Recap
80	April 7	Nashville	2–3	Colorado		Rinne	13,561	47–23–10	104	Recap
81	April 9	Minnesota	4–2	Nashville		Rinne	17,113	47–24–10	104	Recap
82	April 11	Nashville	1–4	Dallas		Hutton	18,532	47–25–10	104	Recap

Legend: Win (2 points) Loss (0 points) Overtime/shootout loss (1 point)

=== Playoffs ===
2015 Stanley Cup playoffs

Western Conference first round vs. (C3) Chicago Blackhawks: Chicago won series 4–2
#	Date	Visitor	Score	Home	OT	Decision	Attendance	Series	Recap
1	April 15	Chicago	4–3	Nashville	2OT	Rinne	17,225	0–1	Recap
2	April 17	Chicago	2–6	Nashville		Rinne	17,208	1–1	Recap
3	April 19	Nashville	2–4	Chicago		Rinne	22,020	1–2	Recap
4	April 21	Nashville	2–3	Chicago	3OT	Rinne	22,014	1–3	Recap
5	April 23	Chicago	2–5	Nashville		Rinne	17,238	2–3	Recap
6	April 25	Nashville	3–4	Chicago		Rinne	22,171	2–4	Recap

Legend: Win Loss

== Player stats ==
Final stats

=== Skaters ===
Regular season
Player	GP	G	A	Pts	+/−	PIM
Filip Forsberg	82	26	37	63	15	24
Mike Ribeiro	82	15	47	62	11	52
Roman Josi	81	15	40	55	15	26
Shea Weber	78	15	30	45	15	72
Craig Smith	82	23	21	44	11	44
Colin Wilson	77	20	22	42	19	22
Mike Fisher	59	19	20	39	4	39
James Neal	67	23	14	37	12	57
Ryan Ellis	58	9	18	27	8	27
Seth Jones	82	8	19	27	3	20
Matt Cullen	62	7	18	25	8	16
Mattias Ekholm	80	7	11	18	12	52
Calle Jarnkrok	74	7	11	18	2	18
Taylor Beck	62	8	8	16	−4	18
Paul Gaustad	73	4	10	14	7	60
Gabriel Bourque	69	3	10	13	−13	10
Eric Nystrom	60	7	5	12	0	15
Viktor Stalberg	25	2	8	10	0	18
Derek Roy^{‡}	26	1	9	10	0	2
Victor Bartley	37	0	10	10	1	26
Anton Volchenkov	46	0	7	7	4	14
Olli Jokinen^{‡}	48	3	3	6	2	26
Mike Santorelli^{†}	22	1	3	4	−7	6
Cody Franson^{†}	23	1	3	4	0	2
Miikka Salomaki	1	1	0	1	1	0
Mark Arcobello^{†‡}	4	1	0	1	0	0
Richard Clune	1	0	0	0	0	0
Joe Piskula	1	0	0	0	−1	2
Anthony Bitetto	7	0	0	0	−1	7
Kevin Fiala	1	0	0	0	−1	0
Viktor Arvidsson	6	0	0	0	0	0

Playoffs
Player	GP	G	A	Pts	+/−	PIM
Filip Forsberg	6	4	2	6	1	4
Colin Wilson	6	5	0	5	−1	0
James Neal	6	4	1	5	0	8
Craig Smith	6	2	3	5	2	0
Mike Ribeiro	6	1	4	5	2	4
Seth Jones	6	0	4	4	−6	6
Viktor Stalberg	6	1	2	3	1	0
Ryan Ellis	6	0	3	3	4	2
Matt Cullen	6	1	1	2	−1	4
Cody Franson	5	0	2	2	1	0
Calle Jarnkrok	6	0	2	2	−2	0
Mike Santorelli	4	1	0	1	2	0
Roman Josi	6	1	0	1	−5	0
Mattias Ekholm	6	1	0	1	4	2
Anton Volchenkov	1	0	0	0	0	2
Mike Fisher	3	0	1	1	1	0
Shea Weber	2	0	1	1	0	2
Paul Gaustad	6	0	0	0	−1	22
Victor Bartley	4	0	0	0	0	2
Taylor Beck	5	0	0	0	−2	2
Gabriel Bourque	5	0	0	0	−3	2
Kevin Fiala	1	0	0	0	−1	0

=== Goaltenders ===
Regular season
Player	GP	GS	TOI	W	L	OT	GA	GAA	SA	SV%	SO	G	A	PIM
Pekka Rinne	64	64	3,851	41	17	6	140	2.18	1807	.923	4	0	1	8
Carter Hutton	18	17	1010	6	7	4	44	2.61	450	.902	1	0	0	0
Marek Mazanec	2	1	106	0	1	0	4	2.26	47	.915	0	0	0	0

Playoffs
Player	GP	GS	TOI	W	L	GA	GAA	SA	SV%	SO	G	A	PIM
Pekka Rinne	6	6	425	2	4	19	2.68	208	.909	0	0	1	0

^{†}Denotes player spent time with another team before joining the Predators. Stats reflect time with the Predators only.
^{‡}Traded mid-season. Stats reflect time with the Predators only.
Bold/italics denotes franchise record

== Notable achievements ==
=== Awards ===
Regular season
Player	Award	Awarded
F. Forsberg	NHL Third Star of the Week	November 17, 2014
F. Forsberg	NHL Rookie of the Month	December 1, 2014
P. Rinne	NHL Third Star of the Month	December 1, 2014
C. Wilson	NHL Second Star of the Week	December 29, 2014
P. Rinne	NHL All-Star game selection	January 10, 2015
S. Weber	NHL All-Star game selection	January 10, 2015
F. Forsberg	NHL All-Star game rookie selection	January 10, 2015
P. Rinne	NHL Third Star of the Week	February 16, 2015

=== Milestones ===
Regular season
Player	Milestone	Reached
C. Smith	200th Career NHL Game	October 18, 2014
P. Gaustad	600th Career NHL Game	October 29, 2014
C. Wilson	300th Career NHL Game	October 29, 2014
E. Nystrom	500th Career NHL Game	November 6, 2014
D. Roy	500th Career NHL Point	November 18, 2014
S. Jones	100th Career NHL Game	November 29, 2014
R. Josi	200th Career NHL Game	December 11, 2014
O. Jokinen	1,200th Career NHL Game	December 20, 2014
M. Fisher	900th Career NHL Game	December 27, 2014
M. Ribeiro	900th Career NHL Game	December 29, 2014
M. Ekholm	100th Career NHL Game	December 29, 2014
P. Rinne	20,000 Career NHL Minutes	December 30, 2014
M. Salomäki	1st Career NHL Game; 1st Career NHL Goal; 1st Career NHL Point	January 8, 2015
R. Josi	100th Career NHL Point	January 8, 2015
A. Bitetto	1st Career NHL Game	January 17, 2015
M. Fisher	500th Career NHL Point	January 29, 2015
M. Ribeiro	700th Career NHL Point	February 7, 2015
V. Bartley	100th Career NHL Game	February 10, 2015
G. Bourque	200th Career NHL Game	February 26, 2015
M. Cullen	400th Career NHL Assist	February 26, 2015
M. Cullen	1,200th Career NHL Game	March 3, 2015
P. Rinne	200th Career NHL Win	March 14, 2015
K. Fiala	1st Career NHL Game	March 24, 2015
C. Wilson	100th Career NHL Assist	March 24, 2015
M. Ribeiro	500th Career NHL Assist	April 4, 2015
R. Ellis	200th Career NHL Game	April 7, 2015
C. Franson	400th Career NHL Game	April 9, 2015
F. Forsberg	100th Career NHL Game	April 11, 2015

Playoffs
Player	Milestone	Reached
F. Forsberg	1st Career Playoff Game	April 15, 2015
M. Ekholm	1st Career Playoff Game	April 15, 2015
G. Bourque	1st Career Playoff Game	April 15, 2015
T. Beck	1st Career Playoff Game	April 15, 2015
S. Jones	1st Career Playoff Game; 1st Career Playoff Assist; 1st Career Playoff Point	April 15, 2015
C. Jarnkrok	1st Career Playoff Game; 1st Career Playoff Assist; 1st Career Playoff Point	April 15, 2015
R. Ellis	1st Career Playoff Assist; 1st Career Playoff Point	April 15, 2015
M. Santorelli	1st Career Playoff Game; 1st Career Playoff Goal; 1st Career Playoff Point	April 17, 2015
F. Forsberg	1st Career Playoff Goal; 1st Career Playoff Assist; 1st Career Playoff Point	April 17, 2015
R. Josi	1st Career Playoff Goal; 1st Career Playoff Point	April 17, 2015
C. Smith	1st Career Playoff Goal	April 17, 2015
V. Bartley	1st Career Playoff Game	April 19, 2015
M. Ekholm	1st Career Playoff Goal; 1st Career Playoff Point	April 19, 2015
K. Fiala	1st Career Playoff Game	April 21, 2015
F. Forsberg	1st Career Playoff Hat-Trick	April 23, 2015

== Transactions ==
The Predators have been involved in the following transactions during the 2014–15 season.

=== Trades ===
Date	Details
June 27, 2014	To Pittsburgh Penguins Patric Hornqvist; Nick Spaling	To Nashville Predators James Neal
June 28, 2014	To San Jose Sharks DET's 2nd-round pick in 2014	To Nashville Predators 2nd-round pick in 2014; 4th-round pick in 2015
June 28, 2014	To San Jose Sharks 3rd-round pick in 2014; 4th-round pick in 2014	To Nashville Predators FLA's 3rd-round pick in 2014
December 29, 2014	To Edmonton Oilers Derek Roy	To Nashville Predators Mark Arcobello
February 15, 2015	To Toronto Maple Leafs Olli Jokinen; Brendan Leipsic; 1st-round pick in 2015	To Nashville Predators Cody Franson; Mike Santorelli

=== Free agents acquired ===
Date	Player	Former team	Contract terms (in U.S. dollars)	Ref
July 1, 2014	Olli Jokinen	Winnipeg Jets	1 year, $2.5 million	
July 7, 2014	Anton Volchenkov	New Jersey Devils	1 year, $1 million	
July 15, 2014	Mike Ribeiro	Arizona Coyotes	1 year, $1.05 million	
July 15, 2014	Derek Roy	St. Louis Blues	1 year, $1 million	
April 9, 2015	Steve Moses	Jokerit	1 year, $1 million	

=== Free agents lost ===
Date	Player	New team	Contract terms (in U.S. dollars)	Ref
July 1, 2014	Patrick Eaves	Dallas Stars	1 year, $650,000	
August 5, 2014	Michael Del Zotto	Philadelphia Flyers	1 year, $1.3 million	

=== Claimed via waivers ===
Player	Former team	Date claimed off waivers

=== Lost via waivers ===
Player	New team	Date claimed off waivers
Mark Arcobello	Pittsburgh Penguins	January 14, 2015

=== Player signings ===
Date	Player	Contract terms (in U.S. dollars)	Ref
July 4, 2014	Joe Piskula	1 year, $550,000	
July 8, 2014	Anthony Bitetto	1 year, $605,000	
July 9, 2014	Mattias Ekholm	2 years, $2.075 million	
July 15, 2014	Viktor Arvidsson	3 year, $1.895 million entry-level contract	
July 15, 2014	Kevin Fiala	3 year, $2.775 million entry-level contract	
September 25, 2014	Ryan Ellis	5 years, $12.5 million	
September 30, 2014	Taylor Beck	1 year, $550,000	
May 6, 2015	Marek Mazanec	1 year, $575,000	
June 16, 2015	Juuse Saros	3 years, entry-level contract	

== Draft picks ==
The 2014 NHL entry draft will be held on June 27–28, 2014 at the Wells Fargo Center in Philadelphia, Pennsylvania.

Round	#	Player	Pos	Nationality	College/Junior/Club team (League)
1	11	Kevin Fiala	LW	Switzerland	HV71 (Sweden-Jr.)
2	42	Vladislav Kamenev	LW	Russia	Metallurg Magnitogorsk (KHL)
2	51^{[a]}	Jack Dougherty	D	United States	U.S. NTDP (USHL)
3	62^{[b]}	Justin Kirkland	LW	Canada	Kelowna Rockets (WHL)
4	112^{[c]}	Viktor Arvidsson	LW	Sweden	Skellefteå AIK (SHL)
5	132	Joonas Lyytinen	D	Finland	KalPa (Finland)
6	162	Aaron Irving	D	Canada	Edmonton Oil Kings (WHL)

=== Draft notes ===
- ^{a} The San Jose Sharks' second-round pick went to the Nashville Predators as the result of a trade on June 28, 2014 that sent Detroit's second-round pick in 2014 (46th overall) to San Jose in exchange for a fourth-round pick in 2015 and this pick.
- ^{b} The Florida Panthers' third-round pick (previously acquired by San Jose) went to the Nashville Predators as the result of a trade on June 28, 2014 that sent a third and fourth-round pick (72nd and 102nd overall) both in 2014 to San Jose in exchange for this pick.
- The Nashville Predators third-round pick went to the San Jose Sharks as the result of a trade on June 28, 2014 that sent Florida's third-round pick in 2014 (62nd overall) to Nashville in exchange for a fourth-round pick in 2014 (102nd overall) and this pick.
- The Nashville Predators fourth-round pick went to the San Jose Sharks as the result of a trade on June 28, 2014 that sent Florida's third-round pick in 2014 (62nd overall) to Nashville in exchange for a third-round pick in 2014 (72nd overall) and this pick.
- ^{c} The St. Louis Blues' fourth-round pick went to the Nashville Predators as the result of a trade on June 30, 2013 that sent a fourth-round pick in 2013 to St. Louis in exchange for a seventh-round pick in 2013 and this pick.
- The Nashville Predators' seventh-round pick went to the Washington Capitals as a result of a trade on April 19, 2014 that sent Jaynen Rissling to Nashville in exchange for this pick.
