= 2014–15 Colorado Avalanche season =

National Hockey League team season

2014–15 Colorado Avalanche
- Division: 7th Central
- Conference: 11th Western
- 2014–15 record: 39–31–12
- Home record: 23–15–3
- Road record: 16–16–9
- Goals for: 219
- Goals against: 227

Team information
- General manager: Joe Sakic
- Coach: Patrick Roy
- Captain: Gabriel Landeskog
- Alternate captains: Jarome Iginla; Cody McLeod
- Arena: Pepsi Center
- Average attendance: 16,176 (41 games)

Team leaders
- Goals: Jarome Iginla (29)
- Assists: Tyson Barrie (41)
- Points: Gabriel Landeskog; Jarome Iginla (59)
- Penalty minutes: Cody McLeod (191)
- Plus/minus: Tyson Barrie (+5)
- Wins: Semyon Varlamov (28)
- Goals against average: Calvin Pickard (2.35)

The 2014–15 Colorado Avalanche season was the 20th operational season and 19th playing season since the franchise relocated from Quebec prior to the start of the 1995–96 NHL season. It was the franchise's 36th season in the National Hockey League and 43rd season overall.

The Avalanche missed the playoffs despite qualifying the previous season.

== Off-season ==
On May 26, 2014, goaltender Jean-Sebastien Giguere announced his intention to retire, reportedly saying, "I do not see a reason to remain in the League."

== Standings ==
Central Division
Pos	Team	GP	W	L	OTL	ROW	GF	GA	GD	Pts
1	y – St. Louis Blues	82	51	24	7	42	248	201	+47	109
2	x – Nashville Predators	82	47	25	10	41	232	208	+24	104
3	x – Chicago Blackhawks	82	48	28	6	39	229	189	+40	102
4	x – Minnesota Wild	82	46	28	8	42	231	201	+30	100
5	x – Winnipeg Jets	82	43	26	13	36	230	210	+20	99
6	Dallas Stars	82	41	31	10	37	261	260	+1	92
7	Colorado Avalanche	82	39	31	12	29	219	227	−8	90

Source: National Hockey League
x – Clinched playoff spot; y – Clinched division

Western Conference Wild Card
Pos	Div	Team	GP	W	L	OTL	ROW	GF	GA	GD	Pts
1	CE	x – Minnesota Wild	82	46	28	8	42	231	201	+30	100
2	CE	x – Winnipeg Jets	82	43	26	13	36	230	210	+20	99
3	PA	Los Angeles Kings	82	40	27	15	38	220	205	+15	95
4	CE	Dallas Stars	82	41	31	10	37	261	260	+1	92
5	CE	Colorado Avalanche	82	39	31	12	29	219	227	−8	90
6	PA	San Jose Sharks	82	40	33	9	36	228	232	−4	89
7	PA	Edmonton Oilers	82	24	44	14	19	198	283	−85	62
8	PA	Arizona Coyotes	82	24	50	8	19	170	272	−102	56

Source: National Hockey League
x – Clinched playoff spot

== Suspensions/fines ==
Player	Explanation	Length	Salary	Date issued
Gabriel Landeskog	Throwing a punch at Minnesota Wild forward Mikko Koivu while both players were on their respective benches during NHL game No. 930 in Denver on Saturday, February 28, 2015, at 19:57 of the third period.	—	$5,000.00	March 3, 2015
Cody McLeod	Entering game late with intention of starting an altercation during NHL game No. 930 in Denver on Saturday, February 28, 2015, at 19:52 of the third period.	—	$3,091.40	March 3, 2015

== Schedule and results ==
=== Pre-season ===
Pre-season game log: 1–5–2 (Home: 0–3–1; Road: 1–2–1)
#	Date	Visitor	Score	Home	OT	Decision	Attendance	Record	Recap
1	September 22	Anaheim	5–2	Colorado		Pickard		0–1–0	Recap
2	September 22	Colorado	0–4	Anaheim		Berra	13,252	0–2–0	Recap
3	September 25	Colorado	2–3	Montreal	OT	Berra	21,287	0–2–1	Recap
4^{[a]}	September 26	Montreal	3–2	Colorado		Varlamov		0–3–1	Recap
5	September 28	Calgary	2–1	Colorado		Varlamov		0–4–1	Recap
6	September 30	Colorado	0–2	Calgary		Berra	19,289	0–5–1	Recap
7^{[b]}	October 2	Los Angeles	2–1	Colorado	SO	Berra	6,176	0–5–2	Recap
8^{[c]}	October 4	Colorado	3–2	Los Angeles	SO	Varlamov		1–5–2	Recap
Notes:^{a} Game was played at Pepsi Coliseum in Quebec City.^{b} Game was played at Broadmoor World Arena in Colorado Springs, Colorado.^{c} Game was played at MGM Grand Garden Arena in Paradise, Nevada.

=== Regular season ===
Game log

October: 3–4–4 (Home: 2–1–2; Road: 1–3–2)
#	Date	Visitor	Score	Home	OT	Decision	Attendance	Record	Pts	Recap
1	October 9	Colorado	0–5	Minnesota		Varlamov	19,098	0–1–0	0	Recap
2	October 11	Minnesota	3–0	Colorado		Varlamov	18,139	0–2–0	0	Recap
3	October 13	Colorado	2–1	Boston		Berra	17,565	1–2–0	2	Recap
4	October 14	Colorado	2–3	Toronto	OT	Varlamov	18,754	1–2–1	3	Recap
5	October 16	Colorado	3–5	Ottawa		Pickard	19,913	1–3–1	3	Recap
6	October 18	Colorado	2–3	Montreal		Pickard	21,287	1–4–1	3	Recap
7	October 21	Florida	4–3	Colorado	OT	Berra	14,440	1–4–2	4	Recap
8	October 24	Vancouver	3–7	Colorado		Varlamov	17,119	2–4–2	6	Recap
9	October 26	Colorado	1–2	Winnipeg	OT	Varlamov	15,016	2–4–3	7	Recap
10	October 28	San Jose	3–2	Colorado	SO	Varlamov	14,552	2–4–4	8	Recap
11	October 30	NY Islanders	0–5	Colorado		Varlamov	12,892	3–4–4	10	Recap

November: 6–6–1 (Home: 3–4–0; Road: 3–2–1)
#	Date	Visitor	Score	Home	OT	Decision	Attendance	Record	Pts	Recap
12	November 1	Colorado	2–3	St. Louis	SO	Varlamov	17,498	3–4–5	11	Recap
13	November 2	Anaheim	3–2	Colorado		Varlamov	15,310	3–5–5	11	Recap
14	November 4	Vancouver	5–2	Colorado		Varlamov	13,221	3–6–5	11	Recap
15	November 6	Toronto	3–4	Colorado	SO	Berra	15,036	4–6–5	13	Recap
16	November 8	Colorado	3–4	Philadelphia		Berra	19,792	4–7–5	13	Recap
17	November 11	Colorado	0–6	NY Islanders		Varlamov	12,888	4–8–5	13	Recap
18	November 13	Colorado	4–3	NY Rangers	SO	Varlamov	18,006	5–8–5	15	Recap
19	November 15	Colorado	3–2	New Jersey		Varlamov	15,626	6–8–5	17	Recap
20	November 20	Washington	3–2	Colorado		Berra	16,476	6–9–5	17	Recap
21	November 22	Carolina	3–4	Colorado		Pickard	17,208	7–9–5	19	Recap
22	November 25	Colorado	4–3	Arizona	OT	Pickard	12,163	8–9–5	21	Recap
23	November 26	Chicago	3–2	Colorado		Pickard	18,007	8–10–5	21	Recap
24	November 29	Dallas	2–5	Colorado		Pickard	15,761	9–10–5	23	Recap

December: 5–5–3 (Home: 3–3–1; Road: 2–2–2)
#	Date	Visitor	Score	Home	OT	Decision	Attendance	Record	Pts	Recap
25	December 1	Montreal	4–3	Colorado		Pickard	14,038	9–11–5	23	Recap
26	December 4	Colorado	3–4	Calgary	OT	Varlamov	18,651	9–11–6	24	Recap
27	December 5	Colorado	2–6	Winnipeg		Varlamov	15,016	9–12–6	24	Recap
28	December 9	Nashville	3–0	Colorado		Pickard	12,689	9–13–6	24	Recap
29	December 11	Winnipeg	3–4	Colorado	SO	Pickard	14,300	10–13–6	26	Recap
30	December 13	St. Louis	3–2	Colorado	OT	Pickard	17,806	10–13–7	27	Recap
31	December 18	Colorado	0–1	Pittsburgh	OT	Pickard	18,603	10–13–8	28	Recap
32	December 20	Colorado	5–1	Buffalo		Pickard	18,831	11–13–8	30	Recap
33	December 21	Colorado	2–1	Detroit	SO	Pickard	20,027	12–13–8	32	Recap
34	December 23	St. Louis	0–5	Colorado		Varlamov	17,634	13–13–8	34	Recap
35	December 27	Chicago	5–2	Colorado		Pickard	18,085	13–14–8	34	Recap
36	December 29	Colorado	0–3	St. Louis		Varlamov	19,749	13–15–8	34	Recap
37	December 31	Philadelphia	3–4	Colorado	OT	Varlamov	18,007	14–15–8	36	Recap

January: 7–3–3 (Home: 5–1–0; Road: 2–2–3)
#	Date	Visitor	Score	Home	OT	Decision	Attendance	Record	Pts	Recap
38	January 2	Edmonton	1–2	Colorado	SO	Varlamov	16,050	15–15–8	38	Recap
39	January 4	Columbus	3–4	Colorado		Varlamov	14,780	15–16–8	38	Recap
40	January 6	Colorado	2–0	Chicago		Varlamov	21,492	16–16–8	40	Recap
41	January 8	Ottawa	2–5	Colorado		Varlamov	14,697	17–16–8	42	Recap
42	January 10	Dallas	3–4	Colorado		Varlamov	18,007	18–16–8	44	Recap
43	January 12	Colorado	1–2	Washington		Varlamov	18,506	18–17–8	44	Recap
44	January 13	Colorado	2–3	Carolina	SO	Pickard	12,965	18–17–9	45	Recap
45	January 15	Colorado	4–2	Florida		Varlamov	9,584	19–17–9	47	Recap
46	January 17	Colorado	2–3	Tampa Bay	SO	Varlamov	19,204	19–17–10	48	Recap
47	January 19	Colorado	1–3	St. Louis		Varlamov	19,187	19–18–10	48	Recap
48	January 21	Boston	2–3	Colorado	SO	Varlamov	16,832	20–18–10	50	Recap
49	January 27	Colorado	3–4	Nashville	OT	Varlamov	15,566	20–18–11	51	Recap
50	January 30	Nashville	0–3	Colorado		Varlamov	18,064	21–18–11	53	Recap

February: 6–7–0 (Home: 3–4–0; Road: 3–3–0)
#	Date	Visitor	Score	Home	OT	Decision	Attendance	Record	Pts	Recap
51	February 3	Colorado	3–2	Dallas	SO	Varlamov	16,521	22–18–11	55	Recap
52	February 5	Detroit	3–0	Colorado		Varlamov	18,087	22–19–11	55	Recap
53	February 7	Colorado	0–1	Minnesota		Varlamov	19,244	22–20–11	55	Recap
54	February 8	Colorado	3–5	Winnipeg		Varlamov	15,016	22–21–11	55	Recap
55	February 12	NY Rangers	6–3	Colorado		Varlamov	17,378	22–22–11	55	Recap
56	February 14	Dallas	1–4	Colorado		Varlamov	18,087	23–22–11	57	Recap
57	February 16	Arizona	2–5	Colorado		Varlamov	14,132	24–22–11	59	Recap
58	February 18	Los Angeles	4–1	Colorado		Varlamov	15,786	24–23–11	59	Recap
59	February 20	Colorado	4–1	Chicago		Varlamov	22,103	25–23–11	61	Recap
60	February 22	Tampa Bay	4–5	Colorado		Varlamov	17,385	26–23–11	63	Recap
61	February 24	Colorado	2–5	Nashville		Varlamov	17,113	26–24–11	63	Recap
62	February 27	Colorado	5–4	Dallas	SO	Varlamov	15,431	27–24–11	65	Recap
63	February 28	Minnesota	3–1	Colorado		Varlamov	18,087	27–25–11	65	Recap

March: 8–4–1 (Home: 4–2–0; Road: 4–2–1)
#	Date	Visitor	Score	Home	OT	Decision	Attendance	Record	Pts	Recap
64	March 4	Pittsburgh	1–3	Colorado		Varlamov	16,905	28–25–11	67	Recap
65	March 7	Colorado	4–0	Columbus		Varlamov	16,599	29–25–11	69	Recap
66	March 8	Colorado	3–2	Minnesota		Varlamov	19,119	30–25–11	71	Recap
67	March 10	Los Angeles	5–2	Colorado		Pickard	15,724	30–26–11	71	Recap
68	March 12	New Jersey	1–2	Colorado	SO	Varlamov	14,607	31–26–11	73	Recap
69	March 14	Calgary	2–3	Colorado		Varlamov	18,007	32–26–11	75	Recap
70	March 19	Colorado	5–2	Arizona		Varlamov	11,684	33–26–11	77	Recap
71	March 20	Colorado	2–3	Anaheim	OT	Varlamov	17,313	33–26–12	78	Recap
72	March 23	Colorado	2–3	Calgary		Varlamov	18,613	33–27–12	78	Recap
73	March 25	Colorado	3–4	Edmonton		Berra	16,839	33–28–12	78	Recap
74	March 26	Colorado	4–1	Vancouver		Berra	18,870	34–28–12	80	Recap
75	March 28	Buffalo	3–5	Colorado		Varlamov	18,007	35–28–12	82	Recap
76	March 30	Edmonton	4–1	Colorado		Varlamov	15,493	35–29–12	82	Recap

April: 4–2–0 (Home: 3–0–0; Road: 1–2–0)
#	Date	Visitor	Score	Home	OT	Decision	Attendance	Record	Pts	Recap
77	April 1	Colorado	1–5	San Jose		Berra	17,562	35–30–12	82	Recap
78	April 3	Colorado	4–2	Anaheim		Berra	17,201	36–30–12	84	Recap
79	April 4	Colorado	1–3	Los Angeles		Varlamov	18,230	36–31–12	84	Recap
80	April 7	Nashville	2–3	Colorado		Varlamov	13,561	37–31–12	86	Recap
81	April 9	Winnipeg	0–1	Colorado	SO	Berra	14,802	38–31–12	88	Recap
82	April 11	Chicago	2–3	Colorado		Varlamov	18,049	39–31–12	90	Recap

Legend: Win (2 points) Loss (0 points) Overtime/shootout loss (1 point)

== Player statistics ==
Final

Skaters

Regular season
Player	GP	G	A	Pts	+/−	PIM
Jarome Iginla	82	29	30	59	0	42
Gabriel Landeskog	82	23	36	59	−2	79
Alex Tanguay	80	22	33	55	−1	40
Matt Duchene	82	21	34	55	3	16
Ryan O'Reilly	82	17	38	55	−5	12
Tyson Barrie	80	12	41	53	5	26
Nathan MacKinnon	64	14	24	38	−7	34
John Mitchell	68	11	15	26	−9	32
Erik Johnson	47	12	11	23	2	33
Zach Redmond	59	5	15	20	−1	24
Maxime Talbot^{‡}	63	5	10	15	2	27
Nate Guenin	76	2	13	15	−1	32
Nick Holden	78	5	9	14	−11	28
Brad Stuart	65	3	10	13	−4	16
Jan Hejda	81	1	12	13	−12	42
Daniel Briere	57	8	4	12	−7	18
Cody McLeod	82	7	5	12	−2	191
Dennis Everberg	55	3	9	12	−7	10
Marc-Andre Cliche	74	2	5	7	−2	17
Jamie McGinn	19	4	2	6	−9	6
Joey Hishon	13	1	1	2	−1	0
Borna Rendulic	11	1	1	2	1	6
Freddie Hamilton^{†}	17	1	0	1	−1	0
Tomas Vincour	7	0	1	1	−1	2
Andrew Agozzino	1	0	1	1	1	0
Paul Carey^{‡}	10	0	1	1	2	0
Michael Sgarbossa^{‡}	3	0	1	1	0	10
Patrick Bordeleau	1	0	0	0	0	0
Ryan Wilson	3	0	0	0	−3	0
Jordan Caron^{†}	19	0	0	0	−1	2
Stefan Elliott	5	0	0	0	−2	2
Ben Street	3	0	0	0	0	0
Duncan Siemens	1	0	0	0	0	0
Colin Smith	1	0	0	0	0	0
Karl Stollery^{‡}	5	0	0	0	3	2

Goaltenders

Regular season
Player	GP	GS	TOI	W	L	OT	GA	GAA	SA	SV%	SO	G	A	PIM
Semyon Varlamov	57	57	3,307	28	20	8	141	2.56	1791	.921	5	0	0	4
Calvin Pickard	16	13	895	6	7	3	35	2.35	511	.932	0	0	0	0
Reto Berra	19	12	748	5	4	1	33	2.65	403	.918	1	0	0	0

^{†}Denotes player spent time with another team before joining the Avalanche. Stats reflect time with the Avalanche only.
^{‡}Traded mid-season
Bold/italics denotes franchise record

== Notable achievements ==
Regular season
Player	Award	Awarded
E. Johnson	NHL All-Star game selection	January 10, 2015
S. Varlamov	NHL Second Star of the Week	January 12, 2015
S. Varlamov	NHL Second Star of the Week	March 9, 2015
R. O'Reilly	NHL Third Star of the Week	March 30, 2015

=== Milestones ===
Regular season
Player	Milestone	Reached
D. Everberg	1st career NHL game	October 9, 2014
D. Briere	300th career NHL goal	October 13, 2014
C. Pickard	1st career NHL game	October 16, 2014
J. Hejda	100th career NHL assist	October 24, 2014
C. McLeod	1000th career NHL PIM	October 24, 2014
D. Everberg	1st career NHL goal 1st career NHL point	November 2, 2014
D. Everberg	1st career NHL assist	November 4, 2014
M. Talbot	600th career NHL game	November 6, 2014
R. O'Reilly	200th career NHL point	November 6, 2014
N. MacKinnon	100th career NHL game	November 13, 2014
A. Agozzino	1st career NHL game 1st career NHL assist 1st career NHL point	November 22, 2014
C. Pickard	1st career NHL win	November 22, 2014
M.-A. Cliche	100th career NHL game	November 29, 2014
C. Smith	1st career NHL game	December 1, 2014
M. Sgarbossa	1st career NHL assist 1st career NHL point	December 4, 2014
B. Rendulic	1st career NHL game	December 9, 2014
B. Stuart	1,000th career NHL game	December 18, 2014
M. Talbot	100th career NHL assist	December 20, 2014
C. McLeod	500th career NHL game	December 21, 2014
B. Rendulic	1st career NHL goal 1st career NHL point	December 31, 2014
A. Tanguay	800th career NHL point	January 8, 2015
B. Rendulic	1st career NHL assist	January 10, 2015
N. Holden	100th career NHL game	January 12, 2015
J. Iginla	1,200th career NHL point	January 30, 2015
J. Hejda	600th career NHL game	February 8, 2015
R. O'Reilly	400th career NHL game	February 12, 2015
C. McLeod	100th career NHL point	February 16, 2015
P. Carey	1st career NHL assist 1st career NHL point	February 16, 2015
M. Duchene	300th career NHL point	February 16, 2015
G. Landeskog	100th career NHL assist	February 22, 2015
N. MacKinnon	1st career NHL hat-trick	February 22, 2015
N. MacKinnon	100th career NHL point	February 24, 2015
M. Duchene	400th career NHL game	February 28, 2015
A. Tanguay	1,000th career NHL game	March 4, 2015
J. Mitchell	400th career NHL game	March 19, 2015
F. Hamilton	1st career NHL goal 1st career NHL point	March 19, 2015
T. Barrie	100th career NHL point	March 28, 2015
R. Berra	1st career NHL shutout	April 9, 2015

== Transactions ==
The following transactions took place during the 2014–15 NHL season.

=== Trades ===
Date	Details
June 30, 2014	To Montreal Canadiens P. A. Parenteau; 5th-round pick in 2015	To Colorado Avalanche Daniel Briere
July 1, 2014	To San Jose Sharks 2nd-round pick in 2016; 6th-round pick in 2017	To Colorado Avalanche Brad Stuart
March 2, 2015	To Boston Bruins Paul Carey; Maxime Talbot	To Colorado Avalanche Jordan Caron; 6th-round pick in 2016
March 2, 2015	To San Jose Sharks Karl Stollery	To Colorado Avalanche Freddie Hamilton
March 2, 2015	To Anaheim Ducks Michael Sgarbossa	To Colorado Avalanche Mat Clark
June 25, 2015	To Boston Bruins BOS's 6th-round pick in 2016	To Colorado Avalanche Carl Soderberg (rights)

=== Free agents acquired ===
Date	Player	Former team	Contract terms (in U.S. dollars)	Ref
July 1, 2014	Jarome Iginla	Boston Bruins	3 years, $16 million	
July 1, 2014	Bruno Gervais	Adirondack Phantoms	1 year, $650,000	
July 1, 2014	Ben Street	Calgary Flames	1 year, $650,000	
July 1, 2014	Zach Redmond	Winnipeg Jets	2 years, $1.5 million	
July 1, 2014	Jesse Winchester	Florida Panthers	2 years, $1.8 million	
July 7, 2014	Maxim Noreau	Ambri-Piotta	2 years, $1.25 million	
May 15, 2015	Andreas Martinsen	Düsseldorfer EG	1 year, entry-level contract	

=== Free agents lost ===
Date	Player	New team	Contract terms (in U.S. dollars)	Ref
July 1, 2014	Paul Stastny	St. Louis Blues	4 years, $28 million	
July 1, 2014	Brad Malone	Carolina Hurricanes	2 years, $1.3 million	
July 1, 2014	David Van der Gulik	Los Angeles Kings	1 year, $550,000	
July 1, 2014	Matt Hunwick	New York Rangers	1 year, $600,000	
July 23, 2014	Andre Benoit	Buffalo Sabres	1 year, $800,000	

=== Claimed via waivers ===
Player	Former team	Date claimed off waivers

=== Lost via waivers ===
Player	New team	Date claimed off waivers

=== Lost via retirement ===
Date	Player	Ref
August 21, 2014	Jean Sebastien Giguere	

=== Player signings ===
Date	Player	Contract terms (in U.S. dollars)	Ref
July 1, 2014	Nick Holden	3 years, $4.95 million contract extension	
July 23, 2014	Ryan O'Reilly	2 years, $12 million contract	
September 4, 2014	Tyson Barrie	2 years, $5.2 million contract	
September 29, 2014	Cody McLeod	3 years, $4 million contract extension	
September 29, 2014	Brad Stuart	2 years, $7.2 million contract extension	
March 24, 2015	Mason Geertsen	3 years, entry-level contract	
May 15, 2015	Andreas Martinsen	1 year, entry-level contract	

== Draft picks ==
The 2014 NHL entry draft was held on June 27–28, 2014, at the Wells Fargo Center in Philadelphia.

Round	#	Player	Pos	Nationality	College/junior/club team (league)
1	23	Conner Bleackley	C	Canada	Red Deer Rebels (WHL)
3	84	Kyle Wood	D	Canada	North Bay Battalion (OHL)
4	93^{[a]}	Nicholas Magyar	RW	United States	Kitchener Rangers (OHL)
4	114	Alexis Pepin	LW	Canada	Gatineau Olympiques (QMJHL)
5	144	Anton Lindholm	D	Sweden	Skelleftea (SHL)
6	174	Maximilian Pajpach	G	Slovakia	Slovakia U18 (Slovakia-2)
7	204	Julien Nantel	LW	Canada	Rouyn-Noranda Huskies (QMJHL)

Draft notes

- Colorado's second-round pick went to the Calgary Flames as the result of a trade on March 5, 2014, that sent Reto Berra to Colorado in exchange for this pick.
- ^{a} Edmonton's fourth-round pick (previously acquired by the Toronto Maple Leafs) went to Colorado as the result of a trade on April 3, 2013, that sent Ryan O'Byrne to Toronto in exchange for this pick.
