= List of 2014–15 NHL Three Star Awards =

The 2014–15 NHL Three Star Awards are the way the National Hockey League denotes its players of the week and players of the month of the 2014–15 season.

== Weekly ==
Weekly
Week	First Star	Second Star	Third Star
October 12, 2014	Tomas Plekanec (Montreal Canadiens)	Darcy Kuemper (Minnesota Wild)	Sidney Crosby (Pittsburgh Penguins)
October 19, 2014	Tyler Seguin (Dallas Stars)	Frederik Andersen (Anaheim Ducks)	Steven Stamkos (Tampa Bay Lightning)
October 26, 2014	Jeff Carter (Los Angeles Kings)	Ben Scrivens (Edmonton Oilers)	Frans Nielsen (New York Islanders)
November 2, 2014	Vladimir Tarasenko (St. Louis Blues)	Pavel Datsyuk (Detroit Red Wings)	Marc-Andre Fleury (Pittsburgh Penguins)
November 9, 2014	Mark Giordano (Calgary Flames)	Craig Anderson (Ottawa Senators)	Vladimir Tarasenko (St. Louis Blues)
November 16, 2014	Jori Lehtera (St. Louis Blues)	Carey Price (Montreal Canadiens)	Filip Forsberg (Nashville Predators)
November 23, 2014	Jannik Hansen (Vancouver Canucks)	Tomas Tatar (Detroit Red Wings)	Jamie Benn (Dallas Stars)
November 30, 2014	Jaroslav Halak (New York Islanders)	Ryan Callahan (Tampa Bay Lightning)	Karri Ramo (Calgary Flames)
December 7, 2014	Pavel Datsyuk (Detroit Red Wings)	Sergei Bobrovsky (Columbus Blue Jackets)	Aaron Ekblad (Florida Panthers)
December 14, 2014	Tyler Ennis (Buffalo Sabres)	Ryan Suter (Minnesota Wild)	Henrik Lundqvist (New York Rangers)
December 21, 2014	Anze Kopitar (Los Angeles Kings)	Jakub Voracek (Philadelphia Flyers)	Marc-Andre Fleury (Pittsburgh Penguins)
December 28, 2014	Johnny Gaudreau (Calgary Flames)	Colin Wilson (Nashville Predators)	Sam Gagner (Arizona Coyotes)
January 4, 2015	T. J. Oshie (St. Louis Blues)	Alexander Ovechkin (Washington Capitals)	Carey Price (Montreal Canadiens)
January 11, 2015	David Backes (St. Louis Blues)	Semyon Varlamov (Colorado Avalanche)	Jonathan Huberdeau (Florida Panthers)
January 18, 2015	Dustin Byfuglien (Winnipeg Jets)	Tomas Tatar (Detroit Red Wings)	Kyle Okposo (New York Islanders)
January 25, 2015	Ryan Johansen (Columbus Blue Jackets)	Erik Karlsson (Ottawa Senators)	Zach Parise (Minnesota Wild)
February 1, 2015	Carey Price (Montreal Canadiens)	Cedric Paquette (Tampa Bay Lightning)	Devan Dubnyk (Minnesota Wild)
February 8, 2015	Devan Dubnyk (Minnesota Wild)	Corey Perry (Anaheim Ducks)	David Desharnais (Montreal Canadiens)
February 15, 2015	Marian Hossa (Chicago Blackhawks)	Tyler Toffoli (Los Angeles Kings)	Pekka Rinne (Nashville Predators)
February 22, 2015	Jonathan Quick (Los Angeles Kings)	Henrik Sedin (Vancouver Canucks)	Max Pacioretty (Montreal Canadiens)
March 1, 2015	Andrew Hammond (Ottawa Senators)	P. K. Subban (Montreal Canadiens)	Evgeni Malkin (Pittsburgh Penguins)
March 8, 2015	Jiri Hudler (Calgary Flames)	Semyon Varlamov (Colorado Avalanche)	Cam Talbot (New York Rangers)
March 15, 2015	Scott Hartnell (Columbus Blue Jackets)	Cam Talbot (New York Rangers)	Andrew Hammond (Ottawa Senators)
March 22, 2015	Ondrej Pavelec (Winnipeg Jets)	Kyle Turris (Ottawa Senators)	Ben Bishop (Tampa Bay Lightning)
March 29, 2015	Devan Dubnyk (Minnesota Wild)	Cam Atkinson (Columbus Blue Jackets)	Ryan O'Reilly (Colorado Avalanche)
April 5, 2015	Andrew Hammond (Ottawa Senators)	Brayden Schenn (Philadelphia Flyers)	Nick Foligno (Columbus Blue Jackets)
April 12, 2015	Jamie Benn (Dallas Stars)	Ondrej Pavelec (Winnipeg Jets)	Mark Stone (Ottawa Senators)

== Monthly ==
Monthly
Month	First Star	Second Star	Third Star
October	Corey Perry (Anaheim Ducks)	Sidney Crosby (Pittsburgh Penguins)	Tyler Seguin (Dallas Stars)
November	Mark Giordano (Calgary Flames)	Vladimir Tarasenko (St. Louis Blues)	Pekka Rinne (Nashville Predators)
December	Ryan Getzlaf (Anaheim Ducks)	Patrick Kane (Chicago Blackhawks)	Sergei Bobrovsky (Columbus Blue Jackets)
January	Alexander Ovechkin (Washington Capitals)	John Tavares (New York Islanders)	Tuukka Rask (Boston Bruins)
February	Devan Dubnyk (Minnesota Wild)	Carey Price (Montreal Canadiens)	Alexander Ovechkin (Washington Capitals)
March	Andrew Hammond (Ottawa Senators)	Jiri Hudler (Calgary Flames)	Devan Dubnyk (Minnesota Wild)

== Rookie of the Month ==
Rookie of the Month
Month	Player
October	Tanner Pearson (Los Angeles Kings)
November	Filip Forsberg (Nashville Predators)
December	Johnny Gaudreau (Calgary Flames)
January	John Klingberg (Dallas Stars)
February	Anders Lee (New York Islanders)
March	Johnny Gaudreau (Calgary Flames)

== See also ==
- Three stars (ice hockey)
- 2014–15 NHL season
- 2014–15 NHL hat tricks
- 2014–15 NHL suspensions and fines
- 2014–15 NHL transactions
- 2014 NHL entry draft
- 2014 in sports
- 2015 in sports
- 2013–14 NHL Three Star Awards
