= 2014–15 Columbus Blue Jackets season =

National Hockey League season

2014–15 Columbus Blue Jackets
- Division: 5th Metropolitan
- Conference: 11th Eastern
- 2014–15 record: 42–35–5
- Home record: 19–20–2
- Road record: 23–15–3
- Goals for: 236
- Goals against: 250

Team information
- General manager: Jarmo Kekäläinen
- Coach: Todd Richards
- Captain: Vacant
- Alternate captains: Jared Boll; Brandon Dubinsky; Jack Johnson; Mark Letestu
- Arena: Nationwide Arena
- Average attendance: 15,391 (36 games)

Team leaders
- Goals: Nick Foligno (31)
- Assists: Ryan Johansen (45)
- Points: Nick Foligno (73)
- Penalty minutes: Jared Boll (109)
- Plus/minus: Nick Foligno (+16)
- Wins: Sergei Bobrovsky (30)
- Goals against average: Sergei Bobrovsky (2.68)

The 2014–15 Columbus Blue Jackets season was the 15th season for the National Hockey League (NHL) franchise that was established on June 25, 1997. The Blue Jackets missed the playoffs for the first time since the 2012–13 season despite qualifying the previous year. The Blue Jackets finished strong, going 15-1-1 in their final 17 games.

== Standings ==
Metropolitan Division
Pos	Team	GP	W	L	OTL	ROW	GF	GA	GD	Pts
1	p – New York Rangers	82	53	22	7	49	252	192	+60	113
2	x – Washington Capitals	82	45	26	11	40	242	203	+39	101
3	x – New York Islanders	82	47	28	7	40	252	230	+22	101
4	x – Pittsburgh Penguins	82	43	27	12	39	221	210	+11	98
5	Columbus Blue Jackets	82	42	35	5	33	236	250	−14	89
6	Philadelphia Flyers	82	33	31	18	30	215	234	−19	84
7	New Jersey Devils	82	32	36	14	27	181	216	−35	78
8	Carolina Hurricanes	82	30	41	11	25	188	226	−38	71

Source: National Hockey League
p – Clinched Presidents' Trophy; x – Clinched playoff spot

Eastern Conference Wild Card
Pos	Div	Team	GP	W	L	OTL	ROW	GF	GA	GD	Pts
1	AT	x – Ottawa Senators	82	43	26	13	37	238	215	+23	99
2	ME	x – Pittsburgh Penguins	82	43	27	12	39	221	210	+11	98
3	AT	Boston Bruins	82	41	27	14	37	213	211	+2	96
4	AT	Florida Panthers	82	38	29	15	30	206	223	−17	91
5	ME	Columbus Blue Jackets	82	42	35	5	33	236	250	−14	89
6	ME	Philadelphia Flyers	82	33	31	18	30	215	234	−19	84
7	ME	New Jersey Devils	82	32	36	14	27	181	216	−35	78
8	ME	Carolina Hurricanes	82	30	41	11	25	188	226	−38	71
9	AT	Toronto Maple Leafs	82	30	44	8	25	211	262	−51	68
10	AT	Buffalo Sabres	82	23	51	8	15	161	274	−113	54

Source: National Hockey League
x – Clinched playoff spot

== Suspensions/fines ==
Player	Explanation	Length	Salary	Date issued
Jack Johnson	Illegal check to the head of Carolina Hurricanes forward Jiri Tlusty during NHL Game No. 176 in Columbus on Tuesday, November 4, 2014, at 7:31 of the third period.	3 games	$70,276.50	November 5, 2014
Jared Boll	Illegal check to the head of Anaheim Ducks forward Patrick Maroon during NHL Game No. 1093 in Columbus on Tuesday, March 24, 2015, at 4:02 of the second period.	3 games	$27,419.34	March 26, 2015

== Schedule and results ==
=== Pre-season ===
2014 Pre-Season game log: 7–1–0 (home: 4–0–0; road: 3–1–0)
#	Date	Visitor	Score	Home	OT	Decision	Attendance	Record	Recap
1	September 21	Columbus	4–3	Carolina		Forsberg	6,250	1–0–0	Recap
2	September 21	St. Louis	3–4	Columbus	OT	McElhinney	11,722	2–0–0	Recap
3	September 23	Pittsburgh	0–2	Columbus		Bobrovsky	12,954	3–0–0	Recap
4	September 25	Columbus	5–4	St. Louis		McElhinney	11,598	4–0–0	Recap
5	September 27	Columbus	1–2	Pittsburgh		Bobrovsky	18,185	4–1–0	Recap
6	September 29	Columbus	3–0	Nashville		McElhinney	11,905	5–1–0	Recap
7	October 1	Carolina	3–6	Columbus		Bobrovsky	11,798	6–1–0	Recap
8	October 4	Nashville	2–3	Columbus		Bobrovsky	14,786	7–1–0	Recap

=== Regular season ===
2014–15 game log

October: 4–6–0 (home: 2–3–0; road: 2–3–0)
#	Date	Visitor	Score	Home	OT	Decision	Attendance	Record	Pts	Recap
1	October 9	Columbus	3–1	Buffalo		Bobrovsky	18,215	1–0–0	2	Recap
2	October 11	NY Rangers	2–5	Columbus		Bobrovsky	18,922	2–0–0	4	Recap
3	October 14	Dallas	4–2	Columbus		Bobrovsky	15,995	2–1–0	4	Recap
4	October 17	Calgary	2–3	Columbus		Bobrovsky	15,987	3–1–0	6	Recap
5	October 18	Columbus	2–3	Ottawa		Bobrovsky	18,994	3–2–0	6	Recap
6	October 23	Columbus	5–4	San Jose		Bobrovsky	17,562	4–2–0	8	Recap
7	October 24	Columbus	1–4	Anaheim		Bobrovsky	15,778	4–3–0	8	Recap
8	October 26	Columbus	2–5	Los Angeles		Bobrovsky	18,230	4–4–0	8	Recap
9	October 28	Ottawa	5–2	Columbus		McElhinney	14,749	4–5–0	8	Recap
10	October 31	Toronto	4–1	Columbus		McElhinney	14,479	4–6–0	8	Recap

November: 2–9–2 (home: 1–5–1; road: 1–4–1)
#	Date	Visitor	Score	Home	OT	Decision	Attendance	Record	Pts	Recap
11	November 1	Columbus	2–3	New Jersey		Forsberg	13,542	4–7–0	8	Recap
12	November 4	Carolina	4–2	Columbus		McElhinney	15,638	4–8–0	8	Recap
13	November 7	Columbus	2–3	Carolina	OT	McElhinney	11,540	4–8–1	9	Recap
14	November 8	Tampa Bay	7–4	Columbus		McElhinney	14,892	4–9–1	9	Recap
15	November 11	Columbus	2–4	Washington		McElhinney	18,506	4–10–1	9	Recap
16	November 14	Columbus	4–3	Philadelphia		McElhinney	19,789	5–10–1	11	Recap
17	November 15	San Jose	1–2	Columbus		Bobrovsky	15,950	6–10–1	13	Recap
18	November 18	Detroit	5–0	Columbus		Bobrovsky	15,438	6–11–1	13	Recap
19	November 21	Boston	4–3	Columbus	SO	Bobrovsky	15,030	6–11–2	14	Recap
20	November 22	Columbus	2–4	Philadelphia		Bobrovsky	19,846	6–12–2	14	Recap
21	November 25	Winnipeg	4–2	Columbus		Bobrovsky	13,745	6–13–2	14	Recap
22	November 28	Vancouver	5–0	Columbus		Bobrovsky	14,121	6–14–2	14	Recap
23	November 29	Columbus	1–2	Nashville		McElhinney	16,548	6–15–2	14	Recap

December: 10–1–1 (home: 6–1–1; road: 4–0–0)
#	Date	Visitor	Score	Home	OT	Decision	Attendance	Record	Pts	Recap
24	December 1	Florida	1–2	Columbus		Bobrovsky	12,309	7–15–2	16	Recap
25	December 4	Columbus	4–3	Florida	SO	Bobrovsky	7,788	8–15–2	18	Recap
26	December 6	Columbus	3–1	Tampa Bay		Bobrovsky	17,467	9–15–2	20	Recap
27	December 9	Philadelphia	2–3	Columbus	OT	Bobrovsky	14,196	10–15–2	22	Recap
28	December 11	Columbus	3–2	Washington	OT	Bobrovsky	18,506	11–15–2	24	Recap
29	December 13	Pittsburgh	3–4	Columbus	SO	Bobrovsky	18,663	12–15–2	26	Recap
30	December 16	Columbus	1–0	Detroit	SO	Bobrovsky	20,027	13–15–2	28	Recap
31	December 18	Washington	5–4	Columbus	OT	Bobrovsky	13,722	13–15–3	29	Recap
32	December 20	Chicago	2–3	Columbus	SO	Bobrovsky	18,164	14–15–3	31	Recap
33	December 22	Nashville	5–1	Columbus		Bobrovsky	14,573	14–16–3	31	Recap
34	December 27	Boston	2–6	Columbus		McElhinney	16,795	15–16–3	33	Recap
35	December 31	Minnesota	1–3	Columbus		Bobrovsky	18,040	16–16–3	35	Recap

January: 5–8–0 (home: 1–3–0; road: 4–5–0)
#	Date	Visitor	Score	Home	OT	Decision	Attendance	Record	Pts	Recap
36	January 3	Columbus	3–6	Arizona		Bobrovsky	13,159	16–17–3	35	Recap
37	January 4	Columbus	4–3	Colorado		McElhinney	14,780	17–17–3	37	Recap
38	January 6	Columbus	4–2	Dallas		Bobrovsky	17,123	18–17–3	39	Recap
39	January 9	Columbus	2–5	Toronto		Bobrovsky	18,965	18–18–3	39	Recap
40	January 10	NY Islanders	5–2	Columbus		Bobrovsky	16,589	18–19–3	39	Recap
41	January 14	Montreal	3–2	Columbus		Bobrovsky	14,964	18–20–3	39	Recap
42	January 16	NY Rangers	2–1	Columbus		Bobrovsky	16,104	18–21–3	39	Recap
43	January 17	Columbus	3–1	Boston		McElhinney	17,565	19–21–3	41	Recap
44	January 19	Columbus	3–1	Minnesota		Bobrovsky	19,064	20–21–3	43	Recap
45	January 21	Columbus	0–4	Winnipeg		Bobrovsky	15,016	20–22–3	43	Recap
46	January 27	Washington	3–4	Columbus		McElhinney	16,514	21–22–3	45	Recap
47	January 29	Columbus	2–3	Florida		McElhinney	7,917	21–23–3	45	Recap
48	January 31	Columbus	1–3	Tampa Bay		McElhinney	18,477	21–24–3	45	Recap

February: 5–7–1 (home: 2–5–0; road: 3–2–1)
#	Date	Visitor	Score	Home	OT	Decision	Attendance	Record	Pts	Recap
49	February 3	Arizona	4–1	Columbus		Forsberg	14,108	21–25–3	45	Recap
50	February 6	St. Louis	1–7	Columbus		McElhinney	16,321	22–25–3	47	Recap
51	February 7	Columbus	4–1	Ottawa		McElhinney	16,891	23–25–3	49	Recap
52	February 9	Los Angeles	4–3	Columbus		McElhinney	14,703	23–26–3	49	Recap
53	February 13	Philadelphia	3–4	Columbus	OT	McElhinney	16,403	24–26–3	51	Recap
54	February 14	Columbus	3–6	NY Islanders		Forsberg	15,678	24–27–3	51	Recap
55	February 17	Columbus	5–2	Philadelphia		McElhinney	19,082	25–27–3	53	Recap
56	February 19	Columbus	2–1	Pittsburgh		McElhinney	18,597	26–27–3	55	Recap
57	February 21	Columbus	1–3	Montreal		McElhinney	21,286	26–28–3	55	Recap
58	February 22	Columbus	3–4	NY Rangers	SO	McElhinney	18,006	26–28–4	56	Recap
59	February 24	Buffalo	4–2	Columbus		Forsberg	13,671	26–29–4	56	Recap
60	February 26	Montreal	5–2	Columbus		McElhinney	12,357	26–30–4	56	Recap
61	February 28	New Jersey	2–0	Columbus		McElhinney	17,814	26–31–4	56	Recap

March: 11–4–0 (home: 3–3–0; road: 8–1–0)
#	Date	Visitor	Score	Home	OT	Decision	Attendance	Record	Pts	Recap
62	March 1	Columbus	3–5	Pittsburgh		McElhinney	18,581	26–32–4	56	Recap
63	March 3	Washington	5–3	Columbus		Bobrovsky	12,915	26–33–4	56	Recap
64	March 6	Columbus	3–2	New Jersey		Bobrovsky	16,213	27–33–4	58	Recap
65	March 7	Colorado	4–0	Columbus		McElhinney	16,599	27–34–4	58	Recap
66	March 10	Columbus	4–3	Carolina	SO	Bobrovsky	10,418	28–34–4	60	Recap
67	March 12	Columbus	3–1	Detroit		Bobrovsky	20,027	29–34–4	62	Recap
68	March 13	Edmonton	4–5	Columbus	SO	Bobrovsky	14,317	30–34–4	64	Recap
69	March 15	Carolina	3–2	Columbus		Bobrovsky	15,258	30–35–4	64	Recap
70	March 18	Columbus	4–3	Edmonton	SO	McElhinney	16,839	31–35–4	66	Recap
71	March 19	Columbus	6–2	Vancouver		Bobrovsky	18,668	32–35–4	68	Recap
72	March 21	Columbus	3–2	Calgary	OT	Bobrovsky	19,289	33–35–4	70	Recap
73	March 24	Anaheim	3–5	Columbus		Bobrovsky	14,044	34–35–4	72	Recap
74	March 27	Columbus	5–2	Chicago		Bobrovsky	22,187	35–35–4	74	Recap
75	March 28	Columbus	4–2	St. Louis		Bobrovsky	19,431	36–35–4	76	Recap
76	March 31	New Jersey	2–3	Columbus	OT	Bobrovsky	14,524	37–35–4	78	Recap

April: 5–0–1 (home: 4–0–0; road: 1–0–1)
#	Date	Visitor	Score	Home	OT	Decision	Attendance	Record	Pts	Recap
77	April 2	NY Islanders	3–4	Columbus	SO	Bobrovsky	15,361	38–35–4	80	Recap
78	April 4	Pittsburgh	3–5	Columbus		Bobrovsky	18,513	39–35–4	82	Recap
79	April 6	Columbus	3–4	NY Rangers	OT	Bobrovsky	18,006	39–35–5	83	Recap
80	April 8	Toronto	0–5	Columbus		Bobrovsky	15,631	40–35–5	85	Recap
81	April 10	Buffalo	2–4	Columbus		Bobrovsky	17,855	41–35–5	87	Recap
82	April 11	Columbus	5–4	NY Islanders	SO	McElhinney	16,170	42–35–5	89	Recap

Legend: Win (2 points) Loss (0 points) Overtime/shootout loss (1 point)

== Player stats ==
Final stats

Skaters

Regular season
Player	GP	G	A	Pts	+/−	PIM
Nick Foligno	79	31	42	73	16	50
Ryan Johansen	82	26	45	71	−6	40
Scott Hartnell	77	28	32	60	1	100
Cam Atkinson	78	22	18	40	−2	22
Jack Johnson	79	8	32	40	−13	44
Brandon Dubinsky	47	13	23	36	11	43
David Savard	82	11	25	36	0	71
James Wisniewski^{‡}	56	8	21	29	−10	34
Artem Anisimov	52	7	20	27	−6	8
Matt Calvert	56	13	10	23	1	28
Marko Dano	35	8	13	21	12	14
Alexander Wennberg	68	4	16	20	−19	22
Kevin Connauton^{†}	54	9	10	19	1	29
Boone Jenner	31	9	8	17	−5	12
Fedor Tyutin	67	3	12	15	8	40
Mark Letestu	54	7	6	13	−9	0
Cody Goloubef	36	0	9	9	12	19
Jack Skille	45	6	2	8	−18	16
Corey Tropp	61	1	7	8	−14	76
Dalton Prout	63	0	8	8	−14	85
Jeremy Morin^{†}	28	2	4	6	1	13
Tim Erixon^{‡}	19	1	5	6	−3	4
Jared Boll	72	1	4	5	−13	109
Michael Chaput	33	1	4	5	−8	21
Brian Gibbons	25	0	5	5	2	8
Rene Bourque^{†}	8	4	0	4	−2	4
Jordan Leopold^{†‡}	18	1	2	3	−7	9
Ryan Murray	12	1	2	3	1	8
Kerby Rychel	5	0	3	3	3	2
Justin Falk^{†}	5	1	1	2	−3	7
William Karlsson^{†}	3	1	1	2	2	0
Sean Collins	8	0	2	2	0	2
Frederic St-Denis	4	0	1	1	−1	0
Josh Anderson	6	0	1	1	−1	2
Adam Cracknell^{‡}	17	0	1	1	−8	2
Ryan Craig	2	0	0	0	0	0
David Clarkson^{†}	3	0	0	0	−1	14
Dana Tyrell	3	0	0	0	−1	0
Luke Adam	3	0	0	0	0	4

Goaltenders

Regular season
Player	GP	GS	TOI	W	L	OT	GA	GAA	SA	SV%	SO	G	A	PIM
Sergei Bobrovsky	51	49	2994	30	17	3	134	2.68	1632	0.918	2	0	2	4
Curtis McElhinney	32	28	1710	12	14	2	82	2.88	949	0.914	0	0	0	0
Anton Forsberg	5	5	256	0	4	0	20	4.69	149	0.866	0	0	0	0

^{†}Denotes player spent time with another team before joining the Blue Jackets. Stats reflect time with the Blue Jackets only.
^{‡}Denotes player was traded mid-season. Stats reflect time with the Blue Jackets only.
Bold/italics denotes franchise record.

== Notable achievements ==
=== Awards ===
Regular season
Player	Award	Awarded
Sergei Bobrovsky	NHL Second Star of the Week	December 8, 2014
Sergei Bobrovsky	NHL Third Star of the Month	January 2, 2015
Nick Foligno	NHL All-Star game selection	January 10, 2015
Sergei Bobrovsky	NHL All-Star game selection	January 10, 2015
Ryan Johansen	NHL All-Star game selection	January 10, 2015
Nick Foligno	NHL All-Star game captain	January 14, 2015
Ryan Johansen	NHL All-Star game MVP	January 25, 2015
Ryan Johansen	NHL First Star of the Week	January 26, 2015
Scott Hartnell	NHL First Star of the Week	March 16, 2015
Cam Atkinson	NHL Second Star of the Week	March 30, 2015
Nick Foligno	NHL Third Star of the Week	April 6, 2015

=== Milestones ===
Regular season
Player	Milestone	Reached
A. Wennberg	1st Career NHL Game; 1st Career NHL Assist; 1st Career NHL Point	October 9, 2014
M. Dano	1st Career NHL Game	October 9, 2014
M. Dano	1st Career NHL Goal; 1st Career NHL Assist; 1st Career NHL Point	October 11, 2014
T. Erixon	1st Career NHL Goal	October 26, 2014
C. McElhinney	100th Career NHL Game	October 31, 2014
J. Johnson	500th Career NHL Game	October 31, 2014
R. Johansen	200th Career NHL Game	November 1, 2014
A. Forsberg	1st Career NHL Game	November 1, 2014
J. Wisniewski	200th Career NHL Assist	November 8, 2014
S. Bobrovsky	100th Career NHL Win	November 15, 2014
J. Wisniewski	500th Career NHL Game	November 25, 2014
D. Prout	100th Career NHL Game	November 25, 2014
C. Tropp	100th Career NHL Game	November 28, 2014
K. Rychel	1st Career NHL Game	November 29, 2014
J. Johnson	200th Career NHL Point	November 29, 2014
B. Dubinsky	500th Career NHL Game	December 11, 2014
S. Bobrovsky	200th Career NHL Game	December 16, 2014
S. Bobrovsky	10th Career NHL Shutout	December 16, 2014
N. Foligno	100th Career NHL Goal	December 18, 2014
M. Chaput	1st Career NHL Goal	December 18, 2014
A. Wennberg	1st Career NHL Goal	December 22, 2014
N. Foligno	500th Career NHL Game	December 31, 2014
B. Dubinsky	100th Career NHL Goal	January 4, 2015
F. Tyutin	700th Career NHL Game	January 6, 2015
S. Hartnell	300th Career NHL Assist	January 6, 2015
J. Anderson	1st Career NHL Game	January 16, 2015
S. Hartnell	1,000th Career NHL Game	February 9, 2015
B. Dubinsky	300th Career NHL Point	February 14, 2015
M. Calvert	200th Career NHL Game	February 22, 2015
C. Atkinson	200th Career NHL Game	March 3, 2015
B. Dubinsky	200th Career NHL Assist	March 10, 2015
C. Atkinson	100th Career NHL Point	March 13, 2015
A. Anisimov	100th Career NHL Assist	March 19, 2015

== Transactions ==
The Blue Jackets have been involved in the following transactions during the 2014–15 season.

=== Trades ===
June 28, 2014	To Detroit Red Wings EDM's 3rd-round pick in 2014	To Columbus Blue Jackets 3rd-round pick in 2014; 3rd-round pick in 2015
July 1, 2014	To Toronto Maple Leafs Matt Frattin	To Columbus Blue Jackets Jerry D'Amigo; Conditional 7th-round pick in 2015
November 15, 2014	To St. Louis Blues 5th-round pick in 2016	To Columbus Blue Jackets Jordan Leopold
December 14, 2014	To Chicago Blackhawks Tim Erixon	To Columbus Blue Jackets Jeremy Morin
December 16, 2014	To Buffalo Sabres Jerry D'Amigo	To Columbus Blue Jackets Luke Adam
February 26, 2015	To St. Louis Blues Adam Cracknell	To Columbus Blue Jackets Future considerations
February 26, 2015	To Toronto Maple Leafs Nathan Horton	To Columbus Blue Jackets David Clarkson
March 2, 2015	To Anaheim Ducks James Wisniewski; DET's 3rd-round pick in 2015	To Columbus Blue Jackets William Karlsson; Rene Bourque; 2nd-round pick in 2015
March 2, 2015	To Minnesota Wild Jordan Leopold	To Columbus Blue Jackets Justin Falk; 5th-round pick in 2015

=== Free agents acquired ===
Date	Player	Former team	Contract terms (in U.S. dollars)	Ref
July 1, 2014	Brian Gibbons	Pittsburgh Penguins	1 year, $750,000	
April 20, 2015	Markus Hannikainen	JYP Jyvaskyla	2 years, entry-level contract	
June 1, 2015	Dean Kukan	Lulea HF	2 years, entry-level contract	

=== Free agents lost ===
Date	Player	New team	Contract terms (in U.S. dollars)	Ref
July 1, 2014	Derek MacKenzie	Florida Panthers	3 years, $3.9 million	
July 1, 2014	Blake Comeau	Pittsburgh Penguins	1 year, $700,000	
July 1, 2014	Cody Bass	Chicago Blackhawks	1 year, $550,000	
July 1, 2014	Jack Skille	New York Islanders	1 year, $750,000	
July 1, 2014	Mike McKenna	Arizona Coyotes	1 year, $550,000	
July 1, 2014	Carter Camper	Ottawa Senators	1 year, $600,000	
July 1, 2014	Jeremy Smith	Boston Bruins	1 year, $550,000	
July 2, 2014	Nick Schultz	Philadelphia Flyers	1 year, $1.25 million	
July 5, 2014	Patrick McNeill	Arizona Coyotes	1 year, $550,000	

=== Claimed via waivers ===
Player	Previous team	Date
Jack Skille	New York Islanders	October 5, 2014
Adam Cracknell	Los Angeles Kings	October 7, 2014
Kevin Connauton	Dallas Stars	November 18, 2014

=== Lost via waivers ===
Player	New team	Date

=== Player signings ===
Date	Player	Contract terms (in U.S. dollars)	Ref
June 28, 2014	Dalton Prout	2 years, $2.15 million contract extension	
July 1, 2014	Frederic St-Denis	1 year, $550,000 contract extension	
July 5, 2014	David Savard	2 years, $2.6 million	
July 7, 2014	Corey Tropp	2 years, $1.25 million	
July 7, 2014	Cody Goloubef	1 year, $625,000	
July 8, 2014	Sean Collins	1 year, $620,000	
July 9, 2014	Will Weber	1 year, $600,000	
July 11, 2014	Brandon Dubinsky	6 year, $35.1 million contract extension	
July 15, 2014	Tim Erixon	1 year, $600,000	
July 28, 2014	Dana Tyrell	1 year, $655,000	
July 29, 2014	Jerry D'Amigo	1 year, $850,500	
September 11, 2014	Sonny Milano	3 years, entry-level contract	
October 6, 2014	Ryan Johansen	3 years, $12 million	
December 31, 2014	Nick Foligno	6 years, $33 million contract extension	
January 9, 2015	Sergei Bobrovsky	4 years, $29.7 million contract extension	
March 1, 2015	Dillon Heatherington	3 years, entry-level contract	
March 2, 2015	Cam Atkinson	3 years, $10.5 million contract extension	
March 6, 2015	Nick Moutrey	3 years, entry-level contract	
March 28, 2015	Cody Goloubef	2 years, contract extension	
May 29, 2015	Justin Falk	1 year	
June 1, 2015	Blake Siebenaler	3 years, entry-level contract	
June 24, 2015	Curtis McElhinney	2 years, contract extension	

== Draft picks ==
The 2014 NHL entry draft was held on June 27–28, 2014 at the Wells Fargo Center in Philadelphia, Pennsylvania.

Round	#	Player	Pos	Nationality	College/Junior/Club team (League)
1	16	Sonny Milano	LW	United States	US NTDP (USHL)
2	47	Ryan Collins	(D)	United States	US NTDP (USHL)
3	76^{[a]}	Elvis Merzlikins	G	Latvia	HC Lugano (NLA)
3	77	Blake Siebenaler	D	United States	Niagara IceDogs (OHL)
4	107	Julien Pelletier	LW	Canada	Cape Breton Screaming Eagles (QMJHL)
5	137^{[b]}	Tyler Bird	RW	United States	Kimball Union Wildcats (NEPSAC)
7	197	Olivier Leblanc	D	Canada	Saint John Sea Dogs (QMJHL)

Draft notes

- ^{[a]}The Detroit Red Wings' third-round pick went to the Columbus Blue Jackets as the result of a trade on June 28, 2014 that sent Edmonton's third-round pick in 2014 (63rd overall) to Detroit in exchange for a third-round pick in 2015 and this pick.
- ^{[b]}The Columbus Blue Jackets' fifth-round pick was re-acquired as the result of a trade on June 25, 2014 that sent Nikita Nikitin to Edmonton in exchange for this pick.
  Edmonton previously acquired this pick as the result of a trade March 5, 2014 that sent Nick Schultz to Columbus in exchange for this pick.
- The Columbus Blue Jackets' sixth-round pick went to the Minnesota Wild as the result of a trade on June 30, 2013 that sent Justin Falk to the New York Rangers in exchange for Benn Ferriero and this pick.
  New York previously acquired this pick as the result of a trade on April 3, 2013 that sent Marian Gaborik, Blake Parlett and Steven Delisle to Columbus in exchange for Derick Brassard, Derek Dorsett, John Moore and this pick.
