= 2014–15 Philadelphia Flyers season =

NHL hockey team season

2014–15 Philadelphia Flyers
- Division: 6th Metropolitan
- Conference: 12th Eastern
- 2014–15 record: 33–31–18
- Home record: 23–11–7
- Road record: 10–20–11
- Goals for: 215
- Goals against: 234

Team information
- General manager: Ron Hextall
- Coach: Craig Berube
- Captain: Claude Giroux
- Alternate captains: Wayne Simmonds; Mark Streit
- Arena: Wells Fargo Center
- Average attendance: 19,270 (98.6%)
- Minor league affiliates: Lehigh Valley Phantoms; Reading Royals

Team leaders
- Goals: Wayne Simmonds (28)
- Assists: Jakub Voracek (59)
- Points: Jakub Voracek (81)
- Penalty minutes: Zac Rinaldo (102)
- Plus/minus: Nicklas Grossmann (+8)
- Wins: Steve Mason (18)
- Goals against average: Steve Mason (2.25)

The 2014–15 Philadelphia Flyers season was the 48th season for the National Hockey League (NHL) franchise that was established on June 5, 1967. For the second time in three years, the Flyers failed to qualify for the playoffs. The Flyers finished the season tied with the NHL record for most overtime losses in a season with 18, which was also held by the 2008–09 Tampa Bay Lightning, 2011–12 Florida Panthers, and 2013–14 New Jersey Devils. This record would later be broken by the 2025–26 Los Angeles Kings, who finished the season with 20 overtime losses.

== Off-season ==
On April 15, 2014, the Flyers re-signed 27-year-old impending unrestricted free agent Andrew MacDonald to a six-year extension for $30 million to keep the defenseman under contract through the 2019–20 NHL season.

On May 7, 2014, Paul Holmgren was promoted to president of the Flyers and Ron Hextall was promoted to general manager.

On June 23, 2014, Hextall's first major move as general manager was to trade Scott Hartnell to the Columbus Blue Jackets in exchange for R. J. Umberger and a fourth-round pick in the 2015 draft. Hextall would later sign free agent defensemen Nick Schultz and Michael Del Zotto to one-year deals.

== Regular season ==
Forward Zac Rinaldo received an eight-game suspension for boarding and charging against Pittsburgh Penguins defenseman Kris Letang on January 20, which was the longest suspension handed out for an on-ice incident during the 2014–15 season.

=== Standings ===
Metropolitan Division
Pos	Team	GP	W	L	OTL	ROW	GF	GA	GD	Pts
1	p – New York Rangers	82	53	22	7	49	252	192	+60	113
2	x – Washington Capitals	82	45	26	11	40	242	203	+39	101
3	x – New York Islanders	82	47	28	7	40	252	230	+22	101
4	x – Pittsburgh Penguins	82	43	27	12	39	221	210	+11	98
5	Columbus Blue Jackets	82	42	35	5	33	236	250	−14	89
6	Philadelphia Flyers	82	33	31	18	30	215	234	−19	84
7	New Jersey Devils	82	32	36	14	27	181	216	−35	78
8	Carolina Hurricanes	82	30	41	11	25	188	226	−38	71

Source: National Hockey League
p – Clinched Presidents' Trophy; x – Clinched playoff spot

Eastern Conference Wild Card
Pos	Div	Team	GP	W	L	OTL	ROW	GF	GA	GD	Pts
1	AT	x – Ottawa Senators	82	43	26	13	37	238	215	+23	99
2	ME	x – Pittsburgh Penguins	82	43	27	12	39	221	210	+11	98
3	AT	Boston Bruins	82	41	27	14	37	213	211	+2	96
4	AT	Florida Panthers	82	38	29	15	30	206	223	−17	91
5	ME	Columbus Blue Jackets	82	42	35	5	33	236	250	−14	89
6	ME	Philadelphia Flyers	82	33	31	18	30	215	234	−19	84
7	ME	New Jersey Devils	82	32	36	14	27	181	216	−35	78
8	ME	Carolina Hurricanes	82	30	41	11	25	188	226	−38	71
9	AT	Toronto Maple Leafs	82	30	44	8	25	211	262	−51	68
10	AT	Buffalo Sabres	82	23	51	8	15	161	274	−113	54

Source: National Hockey League
x – Clinched playoff spot

== Schedule and results ==
=== Preseason ===
2014 preseason
Preseason: 3–3–2 (home: 3–0–1; road: 0–3–1)

Game	Date	Visitor	Score	Home	OT	Decision	Attendance	Record	Recap
1^{[a]}	September 22	Toronto	3–2	Philadelphia	SO	Stolarz		0–0–1	OTL
2	September 22	Washington	4–5	Philadelphia		Zepp	17,679	1–0–1	W
3	September 23	Philadelphia	0–4	Toronto		Mason	15,190	1–1–1	L
4	September 25	New Jersey	0–4	Philadelphia		Mason	18,850	2–1–1	W
5	September 28	Philadelphia	1–3	New Jersey		Zepp	10,404	2–2–1	L
6	September 29	Philadelphia	3–6	NY Rangers		Mason	18,006	2–3–1	L
7	September 30	NY Rangers	2–4	Philadelphia		Emery	18,865	3–3–1	W
8	October 2	Philadelphia	2–3	Washington	SO	Mason	16,765	3–3–2	OTL
Notes:^{a} Game played at Budweiser Gardens in London, Ontario.

Legend: W Win (2 points) L Loss (0 points) OTL Overtime/shootout loss (1 point)

=== Regular season ===
2014–15 regular season
October: 4–4–2 (home: 2–1–2; road: 2–3–0)

Game	Date	Visitor	Score	Home	OT	Decision	Attendance	Record	Points	Recap
1	October 8	Philadelphia	1–2	Boston		Mason	17,565	0–1–0	0	L
2	October 9	New Jersey	6–4	Philadelphia		Mason	19,801	0–2–0	0	L
3	October 11	Montreal	4–3	Philadelphia	SO	Emery	19,745	0–2–1	1	OTL
4	October 14	Anaheim	4–3	Philadelphia	SO	Mason	19,589	0–2–2	2	OTL
5	October 18	Philadelphia	6–5	Dallas	OT	Emery	18,532	1–2–2	4	W
6	October 21	Philadelphia	0–4	Chicago		Mason	21,162	1–3–2	4	L
7	October 22	Philadelphia	5–3	Pittsburgh		Emery	18,661	2–3–2	6	W
8	October 25	Detroit	2–4	Philadelphia		Emery	19,867	3–3–2	8	W
9	October 28	Los Angeles	2–3	Philadelphia	OT	Emery	19,873	4–3–2	10	W
10	October 30	Philadelphia	3–4	Tampa Bay		Emery	18,642	4–4–2	10	L

November: 4–8–1 (home: 4–3–0; road: 0–5–1)

Game	Date	Visitor	Score	Home	OT	Decision	Attendance	Record	Points	Recap
11	November 1	Philadelphia	1–2	Florida		Mason	9,774	4–5–2	10	L
12	November 4	Edmonton	1–4	Philadelphia		Mason	19,566	5–5–2	12	W
13	November 6	Florida	1–4	Philadelphia		Mason	19,777	6–5–2	14	W
14	November 8	Colorado	3–4	Philadelphia		Mason	19,792	7–5–2	16	W
15	November 14	Columbus	4–3	Philadelphia		Mason	19,789	7–6–2	16	L
16	November 15	Philadelphia	3–6	Montreal		Emery	21,287	7–7–2	16	L
17	November 19	Philadelphia	0–2	NY Rangers		Mason	18,006	7–8–2	16	L
18	November 20	Minnesota	3–2	Philadelphia		Emery	19,919	7–9–2	16	L
19	November 22	Columbus	2–4	Philadelphia		Mason	19,846	8–9–2	18	W
20	November 24	Philadelphia	0–1	NY Islanders	SO	Mason	12,409	8–9–3	19	OTL
21	November 26	Philadelphia	2–5	Detroit		Mason	20,027	8–10–3	19	L
22	November 28	NY Rangers	3–0	Philadelphia		Mason	19,969	8–11–3	19	L
23	November 29	Philadelphia	2–5	NY Rangers		Emery	18,006	8–12–3	19	L

December: 6–4–4 (home: 2–1–1; road: 4–3–3)

Game	Date	Visitor	Score	Home	OT	Decision	Attendance	Record	Points	Recap
24	December 2	Philadelphia	1–2	San Jose		Mason	17,159	8–13–3	19	L
25	December 3	Philadelphia	4–5	Anaheim	SO	Mason	15,691	8–13–4	20	OTL
26	December 6	Philadelphia	2–1	Los Angeles		Mason	18,230	9–13–4	22	W
27	December 9	Philadelphia	2–3	Columbus	OT	Mason	14,196	9–13–5	23	OTL
28	December 11	New Jersey	1–4	Philadelphia		Emery	19,572	10–13–5	25	W
29	December 13	Carolina	1–5	Philadelphia		Mason	19,609	11–13–5	27	W
30	December 16	Tampa Bay	3–1	Philadelphia		Mason	19,576	11–14–5	27	L
31	December 18	Florida	2–1	Philadelphia	SO	Mason	19,582	11–14–6	28	OTL
32	December 20	Philadelphia	7–4	Toronto		Emery	19,343	12–14–6	30	W
33	December 21	Philadelphia	4–3	Winnipeg	OT	Zepp	15,016	13–14–6	32	W
34	December 23	Philadelphia	5–2	Minnesota		Emery	19,020	14–14–6	34	W
35	December 27	Philadelphia	1–4	Nashville		Emery	17,315	14–15–6	34	L
36	December 29	Philadelphia	2–4	Arizona		Mason	16,521	14–16–6	34	L
37	December 31	Philadelphia	3–4	Colorado	OT	Mason	18,007	14–16–7	35	OTL

January: 8–6–0 (home: 7–2–0; road: 1–4–0)

Game	Date	Visitor	Score	Home	OT	Decision	Attendance	Record	Points	Recap
38	January 2	Philadelphia	1–2	Carolina		Mason	12,682	14–17–7	35	L
39	January 3	Philadelphia	2–5	New Jersey		Emery	15,066	14–18–7	35	L
40	January 6	Ottawa	1–2	Philadelphia	SO	Mason	19,571	15–18–7	37	W
41	January 8	Washington	2–3	Philadelphia	OT	Mason	19,703	16–18–7	39	W
42	January 10	Boston	3–1	Philadelphia		Emery	19,907	16–19–7	39	L
43	January 12	Tampa Bay	3–7	Philadelphia		Zepp	19,598	17–19–7	41	W
44	January 14	Philadelphia	0–1	Washington		Zepp	18,506	17–20–7	41	L
45	January 15	Vancouver	4–0	Philadelphia		Emery	19,571	17–21–7	41	L
46	January 17	Philadelphia	4–3	Buffalo		Zepp	19,070	18–21–7	43	W
47	January 19	Philadelphia	4–7	NY Islanders		Emery	16,170	18–22–7	43	L
48	January 20	Pittsburgh	2–3	Philadelphia	OT	Emery	19,982	19–22–7	45	W
49	January 27	Arizona	3–4	Philadelphia	SO	Mason	19,581	20–22–7	47	W
50	January 29	Winnipeg	2–5	Philadelphia		Mason	19,673	21–22–7	49	W
51	January 31	Toronto	0–1	Philadelphia		Mason	19,872	22–22–7	51	W

February: 5–3–4 (home: 3–1–2; road: 2–2–2)

Game	Date	Visitor	Score	Home	OT	Decision	Attendance	Record	Points	Recap
52	February 5	NY Islanders	3–2	Philadelphia	SO	Mason	19,042	22–22–8	52	OTL
53	February 8	Philadelphia	3–1	Washington		Emery	18,506	23–22–8	54	W
54	February 10	Philadelphia	1–2	Montreal	OT	Emery	21,287	23–22–9	55	OTL
55	February 13	Philadelphia	3–4	Columbus	OT	Emery	16,403	23–22–10	56	OTL
56	February 15	Philadelphia	2–1	Buffalo		Emery	18,759	24–22–10	58	W
57	February 17	Columbus	5–2	Philadelphia		Emery	19,082	24–23–10	58	L
58	February 19	Buffalo	3–2	Philadelphia	SO	Emery	19,472	24–23–11	59	OTL
59	February 21	Nashville	2–3	Philadelphia	SO	Zepp	19,680	25–23–11	61	W
60	February 22	Washington	2–3	Philadelphia		Zepp	19,703	26–23–11	63	W
61	February 24	Philadelphia	1–4	Carolina		Zepp	11,024	26–24–11	63	L
62	February 26	Philadelphia	2–3	Toronto		Mason	18,892	26–25–11	63	L
63	February 28	NY Rangers	2–4	Philadelphia		Mason	19,979	27–25–11	65	W

March: 3–4–6 (home: 3–1–2; road: 0–3–4)

Game	Date	Visitor	Score	Home	OT	Decision	Attendance	Record	Points	Recap
64	March 3	Calgary	3–2	Philadelphia	OT	Mason	19,513	27–25–12	66	OTL
65	March 5	St. Louis	1–3	Philadelphia		Mason	12,531	28–25–12	68	W
66	March 7	Philadelphia	2–3	Boston	OT	Mason	17,565	28–25–13	69	OTL
67	March 8	Philadelphia	2–5	New Jersey		Mason	16,592	28–26–13	69	L
68	March 10	Dallas	2–1	Philadelphia		Mason	18,723	28–27–13	69	L
69	March 12	Philadelphia	0–1	St. Louis	SO	Mason	19,600	28–27–14	70	OTL
70	March 14	Detroit	2–7	Philadelphia		Mason	19,701	29–27–14	72	W
71	March 15	Philadelphia	1–2	Ottawa	SO	Emery	17,730	29–27–15	73	OTL
72	March 17	Philadelphia	1–4	Vancouver		Mason	18,870	29–28–15	73	L
73	March 19	Philadelphia	1–4	Calgary		Mason	19,289	29–29–15	73	L
74	March 21	Philadelphia	4–5	Edmonton	OT	Emery	16,839	29–29–16	74	OTL
75	March 25	Chicago	1–4	Philadelphia		Mason	19,831	30–29–16	76	W
76	March 28	San Jose	3–2	Philadelphia	SO	Mason	18,783	30–29–17	77	OTL

April: 3–2–1 (home: 2–2–0; road: 1–0–1)

Game	Date	Visitor	Score	Home	OT	Decision	Attendance	Record	Points	Recap
77	April 1	Philadelphia	4–1	Pittsburgh		Mason	18,664	31–29–17	79	W
78	April 4	Philadelphia	2–3	Carolina	SO	Emery	12,852	31–29–18	80	OTL
79	April 5	Pittsburgh	1–4	Philadelphia		Mason	18,435	32–29–18	82	W
80	April 7	NY Islanders	4–5	Philadelphia		Mason	17,927	33–29–18	84	W
81	April 9	Carolina	3–1	Philadelphia		Emery	17,348	33–30–18	84	L
82	April 11	Ottawa	3–1	Philadelphia		Mason	17,027	33–31–18	84	L

Legend: W Win (2 points) L Loss (0 points) OTL Overtime/shootout loss (1 point)

== Player statistics ==
=== Scoring ===
- Position abbreviations: C = Center; D = Defense; G = Goaltender; LW = Left wing; RW = Right wing
- † = Joined team via a transaction (e.g., trade, waivers, signing) during the season. Stats reflect time with the Flyers only.
- ‡ = Left team via a transaction (e.g., trade, waivers, release) during the season. Stats reflect time with the Flyers only.

No.	Player	Pos	Regular season					
No.	Player	Pos	GP	G	A	Pts	+/-	PIM
93	Jakub Voracek	RW	82	22	59	81	1	78
28	Claude Giroux	C	81	25	48	73	−3	36
32	Mark Streit	D	81	9	43	52	−8	36
17	Wayne Simmonds	RW	75	28	22	50	−5	66
10	Brayden Schenn	C	82	18	29	47	−5	34
14	Sean Couturier	C	82	15	22	37	4	28
15	Michael Del Zotto	D	64	10	22	32	−5	34
24	Matt Read	RW	80	8	22	30	−4	14
12	Michael Raffl	LW	67	21	7	28	6	34
40	Vincent Lecavalier	C	57	8	12	20	−7	36
18	R. J. Umberger	LW	67	9	6	15	−9	19
76	Chris VandeVelde	C	72	9	6	15	−6	28
55	Nick Schultz	D	80	2	13	15	2	47
8	Nicklas Grossmann	D	68	5	9	14	8	32
22	Luke Schenn	D	58	3	11	14	−2	18
78	Pierre-Edouard Bellemare	LW	81	6	6	12	−3	18
25	Ryan White	C	34	6	6	12	4	30
47	Andrew MacDonald	D	58	2	10	12	−5	41
5	Braydon Coburn‡	D	39	1	8	9	−1	16
26	Carlo Colaiacovo†	D	33	2	6	8	0	10
49	Scott Laughton	C	31	2	4	6	−1	17
36	Zac Rinaldo	C	58	1	5	6	−9	102
43	Brandon Manning	D	11	0	3	3	3	7
35	Steve Mason	G	51	0	3	3		2
51	Petr Straka	RW	3	0	2	2	1	0
42	Jason Akeson	RW	13	0	0	0	−1	8
39	Mark Alt	D	1	0	0	0	−1	0
52	Nick Cousins	C	11	0	0	0	1	2
29	Ray Emery	G	30	0	0	0		4
53	Shayne Gostisbehere	D	2	0	0	0	−2	0
41	Blair Jones	C	4	0	0	0	−4	2
38	Oliver Lauridsen	D	1	0	0	0	−1	10
72	Rob Zepp	G	10	0	0	0		0

=== Goaltending ===
No.	Player	Regular season										
No.	Player	GP	GS	W	L	OT	SA	GA	GAA	SV%	SO	TOI
35	Steve Mason	51	48	18	18	11	1490	108	2.25	.928	3	2885
29	Ray Emery	31	25	10	11	7	758	80	3.06	.894	0	1570
72	Rob Zepp	10	9	5	2	0	223	25	2.89	.888	0	519

== Awards and records ==
=== Awards ===
Type	Award/honor	Recipient	Ref
League (annual)	NHL first All-Star team	Jakub Voracek (Right wing)	
League (in-season)	NHL All-Star Game selection	Claude Giroux	
League (in-season)	NHL All-Star Game selection	Jakub Voracek	
League (in-season)	NHL Second Star of the Week	Jakub Voracek (December 22)	
League (in-season)	NHL Second Star of the Week	Brayden Schenn (April 6)	
Team	Barry Ashbee Trophy	Mark Streit	
Team	Bobby Clarke Trophy	Jakub Voracek	
Team	Gene Hart Memorial Award	Jakub Voracek	
Team	Pelle Lindbergh Memorial Trophy	Chris VandeVelde	
Team	Toyota Cup	Claude Giroux	
Team	Yanick Dupre Memorial Class Guy Award	Mark Streit	
Miscellaneous	Golden Hockey Stick	Jakub Voracek	

=== Records ===
Among the team records set during the 2014–15 season was single season franchise highs for most overtime losses (18), most shootouts (14) and most shootout losses (11).

=== Milestones ===
Milestone	Player	Date	Ref
First game	Pierre-Edouard Bellemare	October 8, 2014	
First game	Shayne Gostisbehere	October 25, 2014	
First game	Rob Zepp	December 21, 2014	
First game	Petr Straka	January 27, 2015	
First game	Nick Cousins	March 17, 2015	
First game	Mark Alt	March 28, 2015	
25th shutout	Steve Mason	January 31, 2015	

== Transactions ==
The Flyers were involved in the following transactions from June 14, 2014, the day after the deciding game of the 2014 Stanley Cup Final, through June 15, 2015, the day of the deciding game of the 2015 Stanley Cup Final.

=== Trades ===
Date	Details		Ref
June 23, 2014	To Columbus Blue Jackets: Scott Hartnell	To Philadelphia Flyers: R. J. Umberger; 4th-round pick in 2015	
July 2, 2014	To San Jose Sharks: Rights to Tye McGinn	To Philadelphia Flyers: 3rd-round pick in 2015	
February 27, 2015	To Chicago Blackhawks: Kimmo Timonen	To Philadelphia Flyers: 2nd-round pick in 2015; Conditional 4th-round pick in 2016 (Note: The 4th-round pick would be upgraded to a 3rd-round pick if the Blackhawks win two playoff rounds or a 2nd-round pick if the Blackhawks win three playoff rounds provided Timonen plays in at least half of Chicago's playoff games. The pick was upgraded to a 3rd-round pick after the Blackhawks defeated the Minnesota Wild in their second round series on May 7. It was upgraded to a 2nd-round pick after the Blackhawks defeated the Anaheim Ducks in their third round series on May 30.)	
March 2, 2015	To Tampa Bay Lightning: Braydon Coburn	To Philadelphia Flyers: Radko Gudas; Conditional 1st-round pick in 2015 (Note: If Tampa Bay missed the playoffs and ended up with the first overall selection the Flyers would instead receive the New York Rangers' first-round pick, which Tampa Bay had previously acquired. Tampa Bay made the playoffs.); 3rd-round pick in 2015	

=== Players acquired ===
Date	Player	Former team	Term	Via	Ref
July 1, 2014	Blair Jones	Calgary Flames	1-year	Free agency	
July 1, 2014	Rob Zepp	Eisbaren Berlin (DEL)	1-year	Free agency	
July 2, 2014	Andrew Gordon	Winnipeg Jets	1-year	Free agency	
July 2, 2014	Nick Schultz	Columbus Blue Jackets	1-year	Free agency	
July 2, 2014	Zack Stortini	Anaheim Ducks	1-year	Free agency	
August 5, 2014	Michael Del Zotto	Nashville Predators	1-year	Free agency	
August 7, 2014	Ryan White	Montreal Canadiens	1-year	Free agency	
October 30, 2014	Carlo Colaiacovo	St. Louis Blues	1-year	Free agency	
March 10, 2015	Danick Martel	Blainville-Boisbriand Armada (QMJHL)	3-year	Free agency	
March 12, 2015	Cole Bardreau	Cornell University (ECAC)	2-year	Free agency	
May 1, 2015	Christian Marti	Geneve-Servette HC (NLA)	2-year	Free agency	
May 20, 2015	Evgeny Medvedev	Ak Bars Kazan (KHL)	1-year	Free agency	
May 21, 2015	Aaron Palushaj	Avtomobilist Yekaterinburg (KHL)	1-year	Free agency	

=== Players lost ===
Date	Player	New team	Via (Note: In parentheses is the player's free agency group on July 1 if applicable.)	Ref
July 1, 2014	Bruno Gervais	Colorado Avalanche	Free agency (III)	
July 1, 2014	Tyler Hostetter (Note: Hostetter retired.)		Contract expiration (UFA)	
July 2, 2014	Steve Downie	Pittsburgh Penguins	Free agency (III)	
July 3, 2014	Ben Holmstrom	Carolina Hurricanes	Free agency (III)	
July 4, 2014	Kris Newbury	Washington Capitals	Free agency (III)	
August 1, 2014	Kyle Flanagan	Modo Hockey (SHL)	Free agency (UFA)	
August 2, 2014	Adam Hall	HC Ambrì-Piotta (NLA)	Free agency (III)	
August 7, 2014	Cullen Eddy	Sheffield Steelers (EIHL)	Free agency (UFA)	
September 5, 2014	Tyler Brown	Greenville Road Warriors (ECHL)	Free agency (UFA)	
October 8, 2014	Cal Heeter	Evansville IceMen (ECHL)	Free agency (UFA)	
October 11, 2014	Marcel Noebels	Eisbaren Berlin (DEL) (Note: Noebels signed with Eisbaren Berlin on October 13, 2014.)	Release	
November 10, 2014	Yann Danis	Norfolk Admirals (AHL)	Free agency (III)	
November 29, 2014	Marc-Andre Bourdon		Retirement (UFA)	
April 23, 2015	Hal Gill		Retirement (III)	
June 3, 2015	Andrew Gordon	Linkoping HC (SHL)	Free agency	

=== Signings ===
Date	Player	Term	Contract type	Ref
June 23, 2014	Brayden Schenn	2-year	Re-signing	
July 1, 2014	Ray Emery	1-year	Re-signing	
July 2, 2014	Jason Akeson	1-year	Re-signing	
July 4, 2014	Chris VandeVelde	1-year	Re-signing	
July 14, 2014	Jesper Pettersson	3-year	Entry-level	
August 27, 2014	Brandon Manning	1-year	Re-signing	
September 2, 2014	Zac Rinaldo	2-year	Extension	
September 25, 2014	Travis Sanheim	3-year	Entry-level	
October 2, 2014	Nicolas Aube-Kubel	3-year	Entry-level	
February 18, 2015	Nick Schultz	2-year	Extension	
March 2, 2015	Pierre-Edouard Bellemare	2-year	Extension	
March 3, 2015	Tyrell Goulbourne	3-year	Entry-level	
April 10, 2015	Brandon Manning	1-year	Extension	
May 28, 2015	Radel Fazleyev	3-year	Entry-level	

== Draft picks ==
Below are the Philadelphia Flyers' selections made at the 2014 NHL entry draft, held on June 27–28, 2014 at the Wells Fargo Center in Philadelphia, Pennsylvania. The team finished the previous season ranked 13th in the league, but secured the 17th overall pick, ahead of the New Jersey Devils who were relegated to the 30th spot for attempting to circumvent the salary cap in 2010. The Flyers original third and fourth-round picks were traded to New York Islanders in two separate trades.

Round	Pick	Player	Position	Nationality	Team (league)	Notes
1	17	Travis Sanheim	Defense	Canada	Calgary Hitmen (WHL)	
2	48	Nicolas Aube-Kubel	Right wing	Canada	Val-d'Or Foreurs (QMJHL)	
3	86	Mark Friedman	Defense	Canada	Waterloo Black Hawks (USHL)	(Note: The Flyers acquired the Boston Bruins' third-round pick as the result of a March 5, 2014 trade that sent Andrej Meszaros to the Bruins for this pick.)
5	138	Oskar Lindblom	Left wing	Sweden	Brynäs IF (J20 SuperElit)	
6	168	Radel Fazleyev	Center	Russia	Calgary Hitmen (WHL)	
7	198	Jesper Pettersson	Defense	Sweden	Linköpings HC (SHL)	

== Farm teams ==
American Hockey League – Lehigh Valley Phantoms
ECHL – Reading Royals
