= 2014–15 Buffalo Sabres season =

NHL hockey team season

2014–15 Buffalo Sabres
- Division: 8th Atlantic
- Conference: 16th Eastern
- 2014–15 record: 23–51–8
- Home record: 14–22–5
- Road record: 9–29–3
- Goals for: 161
- Goals against: 274

Team information
- General manager: Tim Murray
- Coach: Ted Nolan
- Captain: Brian Gionta
- Alternate captains: Josh Gorges; Matt Moulson
- Arena: First Niagara Center
- Average attendance: 18,580 (41 games)

Team leaders
- Goals: Tyler Ennis (20)
- Assists: Matt Moulson (28)
- Points: Tyler Ennis (46)
- Penalty minutes: Nicolas Deslauriers (71)
- Plus/minus: Mark Pysyk (+4)
- Wins: Jhonas Enroth (13)
- Goals against average: Michal Neuvirth (2.99)

The 2014–15 Buffalo Sabres season was the 45th season for the National Hockey League (NHL) franchise that was established on May 22, 1970. The team finished last place overall in the league with 54 points and did not qualify for the Stanley Cup Playoffs.

== Off-season ==
=== Summer sessions ===
The Sabres held their annual Summer Development Camp for the team's prospects and young players from July 14–18, 2014. The highlight of the camp was the annual Blue-White Game, held on July 15, which drew a crowd of over 8,000 spectators to the First Niagara Center.

The Sabres also sent a team to the Traverse City Prospects Tournament in September.

=== Training camp ===
The Sabres played in six pre-season exhibition games before the start of the 2014–15 regular season.

== Standings ==
Atlantic Division
Pos	Team	GP	W	L	OTL	ROW	GF	GA	GD	Pts
1	y – Montreal Canadiens	82	50	22	10	43	221	189	+32	110
2	x – Tampa Bay Lightning	82	50	24	8	47	262	211	+51	108
3	x – Detroit Red Wings	82	43	25	14	39	235	221	+14	100
4	x – Ottawa Senators	82	43	26	13	37	238	215	+23	99
5	Boston Bruins	82	41	27	14	37	213	211	+2	96
6	Florida Panthers	82	38	29	15	30	206	223	−17	91
7	Toronto Maple Leafs	82	30	44	8	25	211	262	−51	68
8	Buffalo Sabres	82	23	51	8	15	161	274	−113	54

Source: National Hockey League
x – Clinched playoff spot; y – Clinched division

Eastern Conference Wild Card
Pos	Div	Team	GP	W	L	OTL	ROW	GF	GA	GD	Pts
1	AT	x – Ottawa Senators	82	43	26	13	37	238	215	+23	99
2	ME	x – Pittsburgh Penguins	82	43	27	12	39	221	210	+11	98
3	AT	Boston Bruins	82	41	27	14	37	213	211	+2	96
4	AT	Florida Panthers	82	38	29	15	30	206	223	−17	91
5	ME	Columbus Blue Jackets	82	42	35	5	33	236	250	−14	89
6	ME	Philadelphia Flyers	82	33	31	18	30	215	234	−19	84
7	ME	New Jersey Devils	82	32	36	14	27	181	216	−35	78
8	ME	Carolina Hurricanes	82	30	41	11	25	188	226	−38	71
9	AT	Toronto Maple Leafs	82	30	44	8	25	211	262	−51	68
10	AT	Buffalo Sabres	82	23	51	8	15	161	274	−113	54

Source: National Hockey League
x – Clinched playoff spot

== Suspensions/fines ==
Player	Explanation	Length	Salary	Date issued
Michal Neuvirth	Diving/Embellishment during NHL Game No. 886 in Nashville on Sunday, February 22, 2015, at 2:23 of the second period.	–	$2,000.00	February 25, 2015

== Schedule and results ==
=== Pre-season ===
2014 preseason game log: 2–3–1 (Home: 2–1–0; Road: 0–2–1)
#	Date	Visitor	Score	Home	OT	Decision	Attendance	Record	Recap
1	September 21	Buffalo	0–1	Washington		Lieuwen	16,707	0–1–0	Recap
2	September 23	Carolina	0–2	Buffalo		Enroth	18,546	1–1–0	Recap
3	September 26	Toronto	6–4	Buffalo		Neuvirth	18,942	1–2–0	Recap
4	September 28	Buffalo	2–3	Toronto	SO	Makarov	17,249	1–2–1	Recap
5	October 1	Washington	1–6	Buffalo		Enroth	18,228	2–2–1	Recap
6	October 3	Buffalo	1–5	Carolina		Neuvirth	7,890	2–3–1	Recap

=== Regular season ===
2014–15 game log
Record: 23–51–8 (Home: 14–22–5; Road: 9–29–3)

October: 2–8–1 (Home: 0–4–1; Road: 2–4–0)
#	Date	Visitor	Score	Home	OT	Decision	Attendance	Record	Pts	Recap
1	October 9	Columbus	3–1	Buffalo		Enroth	18,215	0–1–0	0	Recap
2	October 11	Buffalo	2–6	Chicago		Enroth	22,012	0–2–0	0	Recap
3	October 13	Anaheim	5–1	Buffalo		Neuvirth	18,912	0–3–0	0	Recap
4	October 14	Buffalo	4–3	Carolina	SO	Enroth	14,930	1–3–0	2	Recap
5	October 17	Florida	1–0	Buffalo		Enroth	17,864	1–4–0	2	Recap
6	October 18	Boston	4–0	Buffalo		Enroth	18,685	1–5–0	2	Recap
7	October 22	Buffalo	1–4	Anaheim		Neuvirth	16,067	1–6–0	2	Recap
8	October 23	Buffalo	0–2	Los Angeles		Enroth	18,230	1–7–0	2	Recap
9	October 25	Buffalo	2–1	San Jose		Neuvirth	17,370	2–7–0	4	Recap
10	October 28	Buffalo	0–4	Toronto		Neuvirth	18,898	2–8–0	4	Recap
11	October 30	Boston	3–2	Buffalo	OT	Enroth	17,477	2–8–1	5	Recap

November: 6–6–1 (Home: 4–3–1; Road: 2–3–0)
#	Date	Visitor	Score	Home	OT	Decision	Attendance	Record	Pts	Recap
12	November 1	Buffalo	0–5	Pittsburgh		Enroth	18,652	2–9–1	5	Recap
13	November 2	Detroit	2–3	Buffalo	SO	Neuvirth	17,815	3–9–1	7	Recap
14	November 5	Montreal	2–1	Buffalo	SO	Neuvirth	17,837	3–9–2	8	Recap
15	November 7	Edmonton	3–2	Buffalo		Neuvirth	17,490	3–10–2	8	Recap
16	November 8	Pittsburgh	6–1	Buffalo		Enroth	19,070	3–11–2	8	Recap
17	November 11	Buffalo	1–6	St. Louis		Neuvirth	17,570	3–12–2	8	Recap
18	November 13	Buffalo	3–6	Minnesota		Enroth	18,925	3–13–2	8	Recap
19	November 15	Toronto	2–6	Buffalo		Neuvirth	19,070	4–13–2	10	Recap
20	November 18	San Jose	1–4	Buffalo		Enroth	17,435	5–13–2	12	Recap
–	November 21	NY Rangers		Buffalo	Game rescheduled to February 20 due to hazardous weather in Buffalo.
21	November 22	Buffalo	2–1	Washington		Enroth	18,506	6–13–2	14	Recap
22	November 26	Winnipeg	2–1	Buffalo		Enroth	18,442	6–14–2	14	Recap
23	November 28	Montreal	1–2	Buffalo		Enroth	19,070	7–14–2	16	Recap
24	November 29	Buffalo	4–3	Montreal	SO	Enroth	21,287	8–14–2	18	Recap

December: 6–7–1 (Home: 6–2–0; Road: 0–5–1)
#	Date	Visitor	Score	Home	OT	Decision	Attendance	Record	Pts	Recap
25	December 2	Tampa Bay	1–2	Buffalo	SO	Enroth	17,772	9–14–2	20	Recap
26	December 4	Buffalo	0–5	Tampa Bay		Enroth	17,767	9–15–2	20	Recap
27	December 6	Buffalo	2–3	Florida		Neuvirth	8,597	9–16–2	20	Recap
28	December 9	Los Angeles	0–1	Buffalo		Enroth	18,438	10–16–2	22	Recap
29	December 11	Calgary	3–4	Buffalo		Enroth	18,208	11–16–2	24	Recap
30	December 13	Florida	3–4	Buffalo	OT	Enroth	18,450	12–16–2	26	Recap
31	December 15	Ottawa	4–5	Buffalo	SO	Enroth	14,578	13–16–2	28	Recap
32	December 16	Buffalo	1–5	Winnipeg		Neuvirth	15,016	13–17–2	28	Recap
33	December 20	Colorado	5–1	Buffalo		Enroth	18,831	13–18–2	28	Recap
34	December 21	Buffalo	3–4	Boston	OT	Enroth	17,565	13–18–3	29	Recap
35	December 23	Buffalo	3–6	Detroit		Neuvirth	20,027	13–19–3	29	Recap
36	December 27	NY Islanders	3–4	Buffalo	SO	Enroth	19,070	14–19–3	31	Recap
37	December 29	Buffalo	2–5	Ottawa		Enroth	18,284	14–20–3	31	Recap
38	December 31	Tampa Bay	5–1	Buffalo		Enroth	19,070	14–21–3	31	Recap

January: 0–12–0 (Home: 0–4–0; Road: 0–8–0)
#	Date	Visitor	Score	Home	OT	Decision	Attendance	Record	Pts	Recap
39	January 2	Florida	2–0	Buffalo		Neuvirth	19,070	14–22–3	31	Recap
40	January 3	Buffalo	1–6	NY Rangers		Neuvirth	18,006	14–23–3	31	Recap
41	January 6	Buffalo	1–4	New Jersey		Enroth	15,162	14–24–3	31	Recap
42	January 8	Buffalo	2–5	Carolina		Enroth	9,781	14–25–3	31	Recap
43	January 9	Buffalo	1–2	Tampa Bay		Neuvirth	19,204	14–26–3	31	Recap
44	January 13	Detroit	3–1	Buffalo		Neuvirth	19,070	14–27–3	31	Recap
45	January 15	Minnesota	7–0	Buffalo		Enroth	18,963	14–28–3	31	Recap
46	January 17	Philadelphia	4–3	Buffalo		Neuvirth	19,070	14–29–3	31	Recap
47	January 18	Buffalo	4–6	Detroit		Enroth	20,027	14–30–3	31	Recap
48	January 27	Buffalo	1–4	Calgary		Enroth	18,563	14–31–3	31	Recap
49	January 29	Buffalo	2–3	Edmonton		Enroth	16,839	14–32–3	31	Recap
50	January 30	Buffalo	2–5	Vancouver		Hackett	18,570	14–33–3	31	Recap

February: 5–6–2 (Home: 2–5–1; Road: 3–1–1)
#	Date	Visitor	Score	Home	OT	Decision	Attendance	Record	Pts	Recap
51	February 3	Buffalo	3–2	Montreal		Enroth	21,286	15–33–3	33	Recap
52	February 5	St. Louis	3–0	Buffalo		Enroth	18,912	15–34–3	33	Recap
53	February 7	Dallas	2–3	Buffalo		Enroth	18,426	16–34–3	35	Recap
54	February 8	NY Islanders	3–2	Buffalo		Neuvirth	18,900	16–35–3	35	Recap
55	February 10	Ottawa	2–1	Buffalo		Enroth	19,070	16–36–3	35	Recap
56	February 15	Philadelphia	2–1	Buffalo		Neuvirth	18,759	16–37–3	35	Recap
57	February 17	Buffalo	1–2	New Jersey	SO	Neuvirth	13,517	16–37–4	36	Recap
58	February 19	Buffalo	3–2	Philadelphia	SO	Neuvirth	19,472	17–37–4	38	Recap
59	February 20	NY Rangers	3–1	Buffalo		Neuvirth	19,070	17–38–4	38	Recap
60	February 22	Nashville	2–1	Buffalo	SO	Neuvirth	19,070	17–38–5	39	Recap
61	February 24	Buffalo	4–2	Columbus		Neuvirth	13,671	18–38–5	41	Recap
62	February 26	Vancouver	3–6	Buffalo		Neuvirth	19,070	19–38–5	43	Recap
63	February 28	Buffalo	3–5	Florida		Neuvirth	10,374	19–39–5	43	Recap

March: 2–8–3 (Home: 0–2–2; Road: 2–6–1)
#	Date	Visitor	Score	Home	OT	Decision	Attendance	Record	Pts	Recap
64	March 3	Buffalo	0–3	Tampa Bay		Lindback	18,922	19–40–5	43	Recap
65	March 6	Buffalo	2–3	Ottawa		Lindback	18,241	19–41–5	43	Recap
66	March 7	Buffalo	1–6	Washington		Hackett	18,506	19–42–5	43	Recap
67	March 11	Buffalo	3–4	Toronto	SO	Lindback	18,844	19–42–6	44	Recap
68	March 14	NY Rangers	2–0	Buffalo		Lindback	19,070	19–43–6	44	Recap
69	March 16	Washington	4–3	Buffalo	SO	Lindback	19,070	19–43–7	45	Recap
70	March 17	Buffalo	2–1	Boston	SO	Lindback	17,565	20–43–7	47	Recap
71	March 20	New Jersey	3–1	Buffalo		Lindback	19,070	20–44–7	47	Recap
72	March 21	Buffalo	0–3	Nashville		Hackett	17,113	20–45–7	47	Recap
73	March 23	Buffalo	3–4	Dallas		Lindback	18,113	20–46–7	47	Recap
74	March 26	Arizona	4–3	Buffalo	OT	Hackett	19,070	20–46–8	48	Recap
75	March 28	Buffalo	3–5	Colorado		Hackett	18,007	20–47–8	48	Recap
76	March 30	Buffalo	4–1	Arizona		Lindback	13,612	21–47–8	50	Recap

April: 2–4–0 (Home: 2–2–0; Road: 0–2–0)
#	Date	Visitor	Score	Home	OT	Decision	Attendance	Record	Pts	Recap
77	April 1	Toronto	3–4	Buffalo		Lindback	19,070	22–47–8	52	Recap
78	April 3	Chicago	3–4	Buffalo		Lindback	19,070	22–48–8	52	Recap
79	April 4	Buffalo	0–3	NY Islanders		Makarov	16,170	22–49–8	52	Recap
80	April 6	Carolina	3–4	Buffalo		Lindback	19,070	23–49–8	54	Recap
81	April 10	Buffalo	2–4	Columbus		Lindback	17,855	23–50–8	54	Recap
82	April 11	Pittsburgh	2–0	Buffalo		Lindback	19,070	23–51–8	54	Recap

Legend: Win (2 points) Loss (0 points) Overtime/shootout loss (1 point)

== Player stats ==
Final stats

Skaters

Regular season
Player	GP	G	A	Pts	+/−	PIM
Tyler Ennis	78	20	26	46	−19	37
Matt Moulson	77	13	28	41	−11	4
Brian Gionta	69	13	22	35	−13	18
Zemgus Girgensons	61	15	15	30	−16	25
Chris Stewart^{‡}	61	11	14	25	−30	63
Drew Stafford^{‡}	50	9	15	24	−18	39
Marcus Foligno	57	8	12	20	−5	50
Rasmus Ristolainen	78	8	12	20	−32	26
Brian Flynn^{‡}	54	5	12	17	−3	8
Johan Larsson	39	6	10	16	0	12
Nicolas Deslauriers	82	5	10	15	−24	71
Nikita Zadorov	60	3	12	15	−10	51
Andrej Meszaros	60	7	7	14	−13	36
Cody Hodgson	78	6	7	13	−28	12
Torrey Mitchell^{‡}	51	6	7	13	−6	26
Tyler Myers^{‡}	47	4	9	13	−15	61
Andre Benoit	59	1	8	9	−19	20
Mike Weber	64	1	6	7	−22	68
Zach Bogosian^{†}	21	0	7	7	−7	38
Mikhail Grigorenko	25	3	3	6	−10	2
Josh Gorges	46	0	6	6	−28	16
Phil Varone	28	3	2	5	−14	10
Tyson Strachan	46	0	5	5	−30	44
Cody McCormick	33	1	3	4	−9	40
Mark Pysyk	7	2	1	3	4	2
Zac Dalpe	21	1	2	3	−11	4
Patrick Kaleta	42	0	3	3	−11	36
Matt Ellis	39	1	1	2	−12	4
Tim Schaller	18	1	1	2	−5	2
Chad Ruhwedel	4	0	1	1	3	0
Sam Reinhart	9	0	1	1	−1	2
Jerry D'Amigo	9	0	0	0	−4	2
Jake McCabe	2	0	0	0	0	0
Joel Armia^{‡}	1	0	0	0	0	0

Goaltenders

Regular season
Player	GP	GS	TOI	W	L	OT	GA	GAA	SA	SV%	SO	G	A	PIM
Jhonas Enroth^{‡}	37	35	2204	13	21	2	120	3.27	1237	0.903	1	0	0	0
Michal Neuvirth^{‡}	27	27	1544	6	17	3	77	2.99	941	0.918	0	0	0	0
Anders Lindback^{†}	16	15	891	4	8	2	41	2.76	542	0.924	0	0	0	4
Matt Hackett	5	4	250	0	4	1	18	4.32	155	0.884	0	0	0	0
Andrey Makarov	1	1	60	0	1	0	3	3.00	36	0.917	0	0	0	0

^{†}Denotes player spent time with another team before joining the Sabres. Stats reflect time with the Sabres only.
^{‡}Denotes player was traded mid-season. Stats reflect time with the Sabres only.
Bold/italics denotes franchise record.

== Notable achievements ==
=== Awards ===
Regular season
Player	Award	Awarded
T. Ennis	NHL First Star of the Week	December 15, 2014
Z. Girgensons	NHL All-Star game selection	January 10, 2015

=== Milestones ===
Regular season
Player	Milestone	Reached
S. Reinhart	1st Career NHL Game	October 9, 2014
M. Moulson	400th Career NHL Game	October 13, 2014
S. Reinhart	1st Career NHL Assist; 1st Career NHL Point	October 25, 2014
T. Ennis	100th Career NHL Assist	November 5, 2014
C. Stewart	400th Career NHL Game	November 13, 2014
T. Myers	100th Career NHL Assist	November 18, 2014
A. Meszaros	600th Career NHL Game	November 22, 2014
B. Gionta	800th Career NHL Game	November 29, 2014
T. Schaller	1st Career NHL Game	November 29, 2014
J. Enroth	100th Career NHL Game	December 11, 2014
J. Gorges	100th Career NHL Point	December 11, 2014
Z. Girgensons	100th Career NHL Game	December 13, 2014
T. Ennis	300th Career NHL Game	December 20, 2014
J. Larsson	1st Career NHL Goal	December 20, 2014
T. Schaller	1st Career NHL Goal; 1st Career NHL Point	December 21, 2014
J. Armia	1st Career NHL Game	December 23, 2014
C. McCormick	400th Career NHL Game	December 31, 2014
J. Gorges	600th Career NHL Game	January 29, 2015
B. Gionta	500th Career NHL Point	February 20, 2015
M. Moulson	300th Career NHL Point	February 22, 2015
Z. Bogosian	400th Career NHL Game	February 26, 2015
Z. Dalpe	100th Career NHL Game	March 3, 2015
T. Ennis	200th Career NHL Point	March 6, 2015
A. Lindback	100th Career NHL Game	March 16, 2015
R. Ristolainen	100th Career NHL Game	March 17, 2015
M. Weber	300th Career NHL Game	March 20, 2015

== Transactions ==
The Sabres have been involved in the following transactions during the 2014–15 season:

=== Trades ===
June 28, 2014	To Washington Capitals 2nd-round pick in 2014	To Buffalo Sabres 2nd-round pick in 2014; 3rd-round pick in 2014
July 1, 2014	To Montreal Canadiens MIN's 2nd-round pick in 2016	To Buffalo Sabres Josh Gorges
July 9, 2014	To Winnipeg Jets Conditional 7th-round pick in 2015	To Buffalo Sabres Jordan Samuels-Thomas
December 16, 2014	To Columbus Blue Jackets Luke Adam	To Buffalo Sabres Jerry D'Amigo
February 11, 2015	To Winnipeg Jets Tyler Myers; Drew Stafford; Brendan Lemieux; Joel Armia; 1st-round pick in 2015	To Buffalo Sabres Evander Kane; Zach Bogosian; Jason Kasdorf
February 11, 2015	To Dallas Stars Jhonas Enroth	To Buffalo Sabres Anders Lindback conditional 3rd-round pick in 2016
March 2, 2015	To Montreal Canadiens Brian Flynn	To Buffalo Sabres 5th-round pick in 2016
March 2, 2015	To New York Islanders Michal Neuvirth	To Buffalo Sabres Chad Johnson; 3rd-round pick in 2016
March 2, 2015	To Montreal Canadiens Torrey Mitchell	To Buffalo Sabres Jack Nevins; 7th-round pick in 2016
March 2, 2015	To Minnesota Wild Chris Stewart	To Buffalo Sabres 2nd-round pick in 2017

=== Free agents acquired ===
Date	Player	Former team	Contract terms (in U.S. dollars)	Ref
July 1, 2014	Andrej Meszaros	Boston Bruins	1-year, $4.125 million	
July 1, 2014	Cody McCormick	Minnesota Wild	3-years, $4.5 million	
July 1, 2014	Brian Gionta	Montreal Canadiens	3-years, $12.75 million	
July 1, 2014	Matt Moulson	Minnesota Wild	5-years, $25 million	
July 1, 2014	Tyson Strachan	Washington Capitals	1-year, $650,000	
July 13, 2014	Zac Dalpe	Vancouver Canucks	1-year, $700,000	
July 23, 2014	Andre Benoit	Colorado Avalanche	1-year, $800,000	
November 28, 2014	Jean Dupuy	Sault Ste. Marie Greyhounds	3-years, entry-level contract	
April 22, 2015	Evan Rodrigues	Boston University	2-years, entry-level contract	

=== Free agents lost ===
Date	Player	New team	Contract terms (in U.S. dollars)	Ref
July 1, 2014	Alexander Sulzer	Kölner Haie	5 years	
July 1, 2014	Christian Ehrhoff	Pittsburgh Penguins	1 year, $4 million	
July 1, 2014	Kevin Porter	Detroit Red Wings	1 year, $600,000	
July 1, 2014	Cory Conacher	New York Islanders	1 year, $600,000	
July 1, 2014	John Scott	San Jose Sharks	1 year, $750,000	
July 18, 2014	Matt D'Agostini	Geneve-Servette HC	undisclosed	
August 6, 2014	Connor Knapp	Lehigh Valley Phantoms	undisclosed	
January 30, 2015	Zenon Konopka	Sanok Hockey Club	1 year, undisclosed	

=== Claimed via waivers ===
Player	Previous team	Date

=== Lost via waivers ===
Player	New team	Date

=== Lost via retirement ===
Player

=== Players released ===
Date	Player	Via	Ref
June 18, 2014	Ville Leino	Compliance buyout	
June 29, 2014	Christian Ehrhoff	Compliance buyout	

=== Player signings ===
Date	Player	Contract terms (in U.S. dollars)	Ref
July 1, 2014	Marcus Foligno	2 years, $3.75 million	
July 5, 2014	Matt Hackett	1 year, $750,750, two-way contract	
July 12, 2014	Sam Reinhart	3 years, $2.775 million, entry-level contract	
July 12, 2014	Jordan Samuels-Thomas	1 year, $640,000, entry-level contract	
July 16, 2014	Chad Ruhwedel	2 years, $1.3 million	
July 17, 2014	Tyler Ennis	5 years, $23 million	
July 27, 2014	Luke Adam	1 year, $650,000, two-way contract	
November 2, 2014	Justin Bailey	3 years, entry-level contract	
November 18, 2014	Arturs Irbe	1 day, emergency contract	

=== Coaching changes ===
Name	Date	Details
Bryan Trottier	August 4, 2014	Named as Assistant Coach
Danny Flynn	August 4, 2014	Named as Assistant Coach
Tom Coolen	August 4, 2014	Named as Assistant Coach
Arturs Irbe	August 4, 2014	Named as Goaltending Coach

== Draft picks ==
The 2014 NHL entry draft was held on June 27–28, 2014 at the Wells Fargo Center in Philadelphia, Pennsylvania. Buffalo finished with the league's worst record, but on April 15, 2014, the Florida Panthers won the draft lottery to jump ahead of the Sabres and secure the first overall pick.

Round	#	Player	Pos	Nationality	College/Junior/Club team (League)
1	2	Sam Reinhart	C	Canada	Kootenay Ice (WHL)
2	31	Brendan Lemieux	LW	Canada	Barrie Colts (OHL)
2	44^{[a]}	Eric Cornel	C	Canada	Peterborough Petes (OHL)
2	49^{[b]}	Vaclav Karabacek	RW	Czech Republic	Gatineau Olympiques (QMJHL)
3	61	Jonas Johansson	G	Sweden	Brynas IF (J20 SuperElit)
3	74	Brycen Martin	D	Canada	Swift Current Broncos (WHL)
5	121	Max Willman	C	United States	Williston Northampton Wildcats (NEPSAC)
6	151	Christopher Brown	C	United States	Cranbrook Kingswood
7	181	Victor Olofsson	RW	Sweden	MODO Hockey (SHL)

Draft notes

- ^{a} Winnipeg's second-round pick will go to Buffalo as the result of a trade on March 5, 2014 that sent Matt Moulson and Cody McCormick to Minnesota, in exchange for Torrey Mitchell, a second-round pick in 2016 and this pick.
- ^{b} Minnesota's second-round pick will go to Buffalo as the result of trade on April 3, 2013 that sent Jason Pominville and a fourth-round pick in 2014 to Minnesota, in exchange for Matt Hackett, Johan Larsson, a first-round pick in 2013 and this pick.
- Buffalo's fourth-round pick will go to the Edmonton Oilers as the result of a trade on March 4, 2014 that sent Ilya Bryzgalov to Minnesota, in exchange for this pick.
- Buffalo's sixth-round pick will not go to the Edmonton Oilers as the result of a trade on December 19, 2013 that sent Linus Omark to Buffalo in exchange for this pick (being conditional at the time of the trade). Omark did not play enough games for the Sabres, so the pick was never traded.
