= 2014–15 Montreal Canadiens season =

NHL hockey team season

2014–15 Montreal Canadiens
- Atlantic Division champions
- Division: 1st Atlantic
- Conference: 2nd Eastern
- 2014–15 record: 50–22–10
- Home record: 26–9–6
- Road record: 24–13–4
- Goals for: 221
- Goals against: 189

Team information
- General manager: Marc Bergevin
- Coach: Michel Therrien
- Captain: Vacant
- Alternate captains: Andrei Markov; Max Pacioretty; Tomas Plekanec; P. K. Subban
- Arena: Bell Centre
- Average attendance: 21,287 (100.0%)
- Minor league affiliates: Hamilton Bulldogs (AHL); Wheeling Nailers (ECHL)

Team leaders
- Goals: Max Pacioretty (37)
- Assists: P. K. Subban (45)
- Points: Max Pacioretty (67)
- Penalty minutes: Brandon Prust (130)
- Plus/minus: Max Pacioretty (+38)
- Wins: Carey Price (44)
- Goals against average: Carey Price (1.96)

The 2014–15 Montreal Canadiens season was the 106th season of play for the franchise that was founded on December 4, 1909, and was also their 98th season in the National Hockey League (NHL).

== Off-season ==
Defenceman Douglas Murray, forward George Parros and forward Thomas Vanek became free agents. On July 1, 2014, captain Brian Gionta signed with the Buffalo Sabres, being joined by defenseman Josh Gorges, who was traded to the team the same day for the Minnesota Wild's 2016 second round pick previously acquired in a trade for Matt Moulson. Notable free agent signings included defenseman Tom Gilbert, centre Manny Malhotra and prospect Jiri Sekac, formally of the Kontinental Hockey League (KHL). On August 2, 2014, after months of ongoing negotiations, defenceman P. K. Subban signed an eight-year contract extension worth $72 million, avoiding salary arbitration. Subban becomes the highest paid defenseman through the 2014–15 season.

Hockey operations changes included Daniel Lacroix and Rob Ramage being appointed assistant coach and player development coach, respectively. Ramage had previously played for the Canadiens and was part of the 1993 Stanley Cup Championship team, while Lacroix worked as assistant coach with the Hamilton Bulldogs, the Canadiens' main affiliate team in the American Hockey League (AHL) during the 2009–10 season. The Canadiens also announced a reorganization within the hockey department. Rick Dudley was named senior vice president, hockey operations. Scott Mellanby was promoted to assistant general manager, to work along with Larry Carriere. Trevor Timmins was appointed vice president of player personnel, as well as retaining his responsibilities as the club's director of amateur scouting.

On June 18, 2014, it was announced that hall of famer Guy Lapointe would be honored by having his number 5 jersey retired during the 2014–15 season. Lapointe will become the 18th player to be honoured by the organization with jersey retirement and the second with the number 5, joining the late Bernie Geoffrion.

For only the second time in franchise history, the Canadiens did not name a captain, instead opting for four alternate captains for the season. On September 15, team management named Andrei Markov, Max Pacioretty, Tomas Plekanec and P. K. Subban alternative captains.

The 2014–15 season also marked changes to television broadcast rights to the Canadiens; Réseau des sports renewed its French-language television rights to the team, agreeing to a 12-year extension. Due to Quebecor Media's exclusive national French-language broadcast rights to the NHL, RDS will now only be able to broadcast games in the team's blackout region of Quebec and eastern Canada. Regional television rights in English were acquired by Sportsnet East in a three-year deal announced by Rogers on September 2, 2014. Three regional games will also be broadcast by City Montreal.

== Standings ==
Atlantic Division
Pos	Team	GP	W	L	OTL	ROW	GF	GA	GD	Pts
1	y – Montreal Canadiens	82	50	22	10	43	221	189	+32	110
2	x – Tampa Bay Lightning	82	50	24	8	47	262	211	+51	108
3	x – Detroit Red Wings	82	43	25	14	39	235	221	+14	100
4	x – Ottawa Senators	82	43	26	13	37	238	215	+23	99
5	Boston Bruins	82	41	27	14	37	213	211	+2	96
6	Florida Panthers	82	38	29	15	30	206	223	−17	91
7	Toronto Maple Leafs	82	30	44	8	25	211	262	−51	68
8	Buffalo Sabres	82	23	51	8	15	161	274	−113	54

Source: National Hockey League
x – Clinched playoff spot; y – Clinched division

== Schedule and results ==
=== Pre-season ===
2014 preseason game log: 4–2–1 (Home: 2–2–0; Road: 2–0–1)
#	Date	Visitor	Score	Home	OT	Decision	Attendance	Record	Recap
1	September 23	Boston	2–3	Montreal		MacDonald	21,287	1–0–0	Recap
2	September 25	Colorado	2–3	Montreal	OT	Budaj	21,287	2–0–0	Recap
3^{[a]}	September 26	Montreal	3–2	Colorado		Tokarski	15,074	3–0–0	Recap
4	September 28	Washington	2–0	Montreal		Price	21,287	3–1–0	Recap
5	October 1	Montreal	3–1	Chicago		Price	20,413	4–1–0	Recap
6	October 3	Montreal	3–4	Ottawa	OT	Budaj	19,034	4–1–1	Recap
7	October 4	Ottawa	4–2	Montreal		Price	21,287	4–2–1	Recap
Notes:^{a} Game was played at Pepsi Coliseum in Quebec City.

=== Regular season ===
2014–15 Game Log

October: 8–2–1 (Home: 4–0–0; Road: 4–2–1)
#	Date	Visitor	Score	Home	OT	Decision	Attendance	Record	Pts	Recap
1	October 8	Montreal	4–3	Toronto		Price	19,745	1–0–0	2	Recap
2	October 9	Montreal	2–1	Washington	SO	Tokarski	18,506	2–0–0	4	Recap
3	October 11	Montreal	4–3	Philadelphia	SO	Price	19,745	3–0–0	6	Recap
4	October 13	Montreal	1–7	Tampa Bay		Price	17,622	3–1–0	6	Recap
5	October 16	Boston	4–6	Montreal		Price	21,287	4–1–0	8	Recap
6	October 18	Colorado	2–3	Montreal		Price	21,287	5–1–0	10	Recap
7	October 21	Detroit	1–2	Montreal	OT	Price	21,287	6–1–0	12	Recap
8	October 25	NY Rangers	1–3	Montreal		Price	21,287	7–1–0	14	Recap
9	October 27	Montreal	0–3	Edmonton		Tokarski	16,839	7–2–0	14	Recap
10	October 28	Montreal	2–1	Calgary	SO	Price	19,289	8–2–0	16	Recap
11	October 30	Montreal	2–3	Vancouver	OT	Price	18,870	8–2–1	17	Recap

November: 8–5–1 (Home: 5–3–1; Road: 3–2–0)
#	Date	Visitor	Score	Home	OT	Decision	Attendance	Record	Pts	Recap
12	November 2	Calgary	6–2	Montreal		Price	21,287	8–3–1	17	Recap
13	November 4	Chicago	5–0	Montreal		Price	21,287	8–4–1	17	Recap
14	November 5	Montreal	2–1	Buffalo	SO	Tokarski	17,837	9–4–1	19	Recap
15	November 8	Minnesota	1–4	Montreal		Price	21,287	10–4–1	21	Recap
16	November 11	Winnipeg	0–3	Montreal		Price	21,287	11–4–1	23	Recap
17	November 13	Boston	1–5	Montreal		Price	21,287	12–4–1	25	Recap
18	November 15	Philadelphia	3–6	Montreal		Price	21,287	13–4–1	27	Recap
19	November 16	Montreal	4–1	Detroit		Tokarski	20,027	14–4–1	29	Recap
20	November 18	Pittsburgh	4–0	Montreal		Price	21,287	14–5–1	29	Recap
21	November 20	St. Louis	1–4	Montreal		Price	21,287	15–5–1	31	Recap
22	November 22	Montreal	2–0	Boston		Price	17,565	16–5–1	33	Recap
23	November 23	Montreal	0–5	NY Rangers		Tokarski	18,006	16–6–1	33	Recap
24	November 28	Montreal	1–2	Buffalo		Price	19,070	16–7–1	33	Recap
25	November 29	Buffalo	4–3	Montreal	SO	Tokarski	21,287	16–7–2	34	Recap

December: 8–4–0 (Home: 4–1–0; Road: 4–3–0)
#	Date	Visitor	Score	Home	OT	Decision	Attendance	Record	Pts	Recap
26	December 1	Montreal	4–3	Colorado		Price	14,038	17–7–2	36	Recap
27	December 3	Montreal	1–2	Minnesota		Price	19,034	17–8–2	36	Recap
28	December 5	Montreal	3–4	Chicago		Price	22,087	17–9–2	36	Recap
29	December 6	Montreal	1–4	Dallas		Price	16,098	17–10–2	36	Recap
30	December 9	Vancouver	1–3	Montreal		Price	21,286	18–10–2	38	Recap
31	December 12	Los Angeles	2–6	Montreal		Price	21,286	19–10–2	40	Recap
32	December 16	Carolina	1–4	Montreal		Price	21,286	20–10–2	42	Recap
33	December 18	Anaheim	2–1	Montreal		Price	21,286	20–11–2	42	Recap
34	December 20	Ottawa	1–4	Montreal		Price	21,286	21–11–2	44	Recap
35	December 23	Montreal	3–1	NY Islanders		Price	16,170	22–11–2	46	Recap
36	December 29	Montreal	3–1	Carolina		Price	17,123	23–11–2	48	Recap
37	December 30	Montreal	2–1	Florida	SO	Tokarski	19,164	24–11–2	50	Recap

January: 8–2–1 (Home: 4–1–1; Road: 4–1–0)
#	Date	Visitor	Score	Home	OT	Decision	Attendance	Record	Pts	Recap
38	January 2	Montreal	4–2	New Jersey		Price	16,174	25–11–2	52	Recap
39	January 3	Montreal	4–1	Pittsburgh		Price	18,630	26–11–2	54	Recap
40	January 6	Tampa Bay	4–2	Montreal		Price	21,286	26–12–2	54	Recap
41	January 10	Pittsburgh	2–1	Montreal	OT	Price	21,286	26–12–3	55	Recap
42	January 14	Montreal	3–2	Columbus		Price	14,964	27–12–3	57	Recap
43	January 15	Montreal	1–4	Ottawa		Tokarski	19,893	27–13–3	57	Recap
44	January 17	NY Islanders	4–6	Montreal		Tokarski	21,287	28–13–3	59	Recap
45	January 20	Nashville	1–2	Montreal	OT	Price	21,287	29–13–3	61	Recap
46	January 27	Dallas	2–3	Montreal		Price	21,286	30–13–3	63	Recap
47	January 29	Montreal	1–0	NY Rangers		Price	18,006	31–13–3	65	Recap
48	January 31	Washington	0–1	Montreal	OT	Price	21,286	32–13–3	67	Recap

February: 9–3–2 (Home: 5–2–2; Road: 4–1–0)
#	Date	Visitor	Score	Home	OT	Decision	Attendance	Record	Pts	Recap
49	February 1	Arizona	3–2	Montreal		Tokarski	21,286	32–14–3	67	Recap
50	February 3	Buffalo	3–2	Montreal		Price	21,286	32–15–3	67	Recap
51	February 7	New Jersey	2–6	Montreal		Price	21,287	33–15–3	69	Recap
52	February 8	Montreal	3–1	Boston		Price	17,565	34–15–3	71	Recap
53	February 10	Philadelphia	1–2	Montreal	OT	Price	21,287	35–15–3	73	Recap
54	February 12	Edmonton	4–3	Montreal	OT	Tokarski	21,286	35–15–4	74	Recap
55	February 14	Toronto	1–2	Montreal	SO	Price	21,287	36–15–4	76	Recap
56	February 16	Montreal	2–0	Detroit		Price	20,027	37–15–4	78	Recap
57	February 18	Montreal	2–4	Ottawa		Tokarski	18,949	37–16–4	78	Recap
58	February 19	Florida	3–2	Montreal	SO	Price	21,286	37–16–5	79	Recap
59	February 21	Columbus	1–3	Montreal		Price	21,286	38–16–5	81	Recap
60	February 24	Montreal	5–2	St. Louis		Price	19,383	39–16–5	83	Recap
61	February 26	Montreal	5–2	Columbus		Price	12,357	40–16–5	85	Recap
62	February 28	Toronto	0–4	Montreal		Price	21,287	41–16–5	87	Recap

March: 6–6–3 (Home: 3–2–1; Road: 3–4–2)
#	Date	Visitor	Score	Home	OT	Decision	Attendance	Record	Pts	Recap
63	March 2	Montreal	0–4	San Jose		Price	17,236	41–17–5	87	Recap
64	March 4	Montreal	1–3	Anaheim		Price	17,174	41–18–5	87	Recap
65	March 5	Montreal	3–4	Los Angeles	SO	Tokarski	18,230	41–18–6	88	Recap
66	March 7	Montreal	2–0	Arizona		Price	14,094	42–18–6	90	Recap
67	March 10	Tampa Bay	1–0	Montreal	OT	Price	21,287	42–18–7	91	Recap
68	March 12	Ottawa	5–2	Montreal		Price	21,287	42–19–7	91	Recap
69	March 14	Montreal	3–1	NY Islanders		Price	16,170	43–19–7	93	Recap
70	March 16	Montreal	2–4	Tampa Bay		Price	19,204	43–20–7	93	Recap
71	March 17	Montreal	3–2	Florida		Tokarski	18,245	44–20–7	95	Recap
72	March 19	Carolina	0–4	Montreal		Price	21,286	45–20–7	97	Recap
73	March 21	San Jose	0–2	Montreal		Price	21,286	46–20–7	99	Recap
74	March 24	Montreal	2–3	Nashville	OT	Price	17,113	46–20–8	100	Recap
75	March 26	Montreal	2–5	Winnipeg		Tokarski	15,016	46–21–8	100	Recap
76	March 28	Florida	2–3	Montreal	OT	Price	21,287	47–21–8	102	Recap
77	March 30	Tampa Bay	5–3	Montreal		Price	21,286	47–22–8	102	Recap

April: 3–0–2 (Home: 1–0–1; Road: 2–0–1)
#	Date	Visitor	Score	Home	OT	Decision	Attendance	Record	Pts	Recap
78	April 2	Washington	5–4	Montreal	SO	Price	21,286	47–22–9	103	Recap
79	April 3	Montreal	2–3	New Jersey	SO	Tokarski	16,592	47–22–10	104	Recap
80	April 5	Montreal	4–1	Florida		Price	14,112	48–22–10	106	Recap
81	April 9	Detroit	3–4	Montreal	OT	Price	21,287	49–22–10	108	Recap
82	April 11	Montreal	4–3	Toronto	SO	Price	19,308	50–22–10	110	Recap

Legend: Win (2 points) Loss (0 points) Overtime/shootout loss (1 point)

== Playoffs ==
The Montreal Canadiens entered the playoffs as the Atlantic Division regular season champions. The Canadiens won the first three games of the series en route to defeating the Senators in six games. In game one, Brian Flynn scored the game-winning goal at 17:17 of the second period, and recorded two assists as the Canadiens won 4–3. Montreal's P. K. Subban was given a five-minute major and a game misconduct for slashing Ottawa's Mark Stone during the second period, resulting in a microfracture of Stone's right wrist, but did not face any further League discipline. Alex Galchenyuk's goal at 3:40 into overtime gave the Canadiens a 3–2 win in game two. Cameron replaced Andrew Hammond with Craig Anderson as his starting goalie for game three, who despite a strong outing, surrendered the tying goal by but Dale Weise with 5:47 left in the third period, who also scored at 3:40 into overtime to give Montreal a 2–1 win. Anderson rebounded in game four, stopping all 28 Montreal shots while Mike Hoffman scored the Senators' only goal to win 1–0. Ottawa also took game five by a score of 5–1 as Anderson stopped 45 of 46 shots, with Bobby Ryan contributing two goals. The Canadiens then eliminated the Senators in game six by a score of 2–0, with goaltender Carey Price registering the shutout stopping all 43 of Ottawa's shots.

In the second round, Tampa Bay Lightning defeated the Canadiens in six games. In game one, Nikita Kucherov scored 2:06 into double overtime to give Tampa Bay a 2–1 win. This winning goal was controversial because the Lightning appeared to have been offside on the play, but nothing was called by the linesmen. Earlier at 2:56 of the first overtime period, Kucherov's apparent winning goal was waved off after officials ruled that he pushing Carey Price's pad into the net after the Montreal goalie made the initial save. The Lightning also won game two, 6–2, scoring four power play goals. Montreal's Brandon Prust was then fined $5,000 for his postgame derogatory public comments directed toward referee Brad Watson, which he later apologized for the day afterward. In game three, Tyler Johnson scored with 1.1 seconds left to give Tampa Bay a 2–1 victory. The Canadiens stayed alive in game four, as Max Pacioretty recorded a shorthanded goal and two assists, as Montreal built a 5–0 second-period lead en route to a 6–2 win. Then, in game five, P.A. Parenteau scored with 4:07 left in regulation to give the Canadiens a 2–1 victory. In game six, Ben Bishop stopped 18 of 19 Montreal shots, and Kucherov scored two goals, as Tampa Bay won 4–1 to take the series.

2015 Stanley Cup playoffs

Eastern Conference First Round vs. (WC1) Ottawa Senators: Montreal wins 4–2
#	Date	Visitor	Score	Home	OT	Decision	Attendance	Series	Recap
1	April 15	Ottawa	3–4	Montreal		Price	21,287	1–0	Recap
2	April 17	Ottawa	2–3	Montreal	OT	Price	21,287	2–0	Recap
3	April 19	Montreal	2–1	Ottawa	OT	Price	20,500	3–0	Recap
4	April 22	Montreal	0–1	Ottawa		Price	20,500	3–1	Recap
5	April 24	Ottawa	5–1	Montreal		Price	21,287	3–2	Recap
6	April 26	Montreal	2–0	Ottawa		Price	20,500	4–2	Recap

Eastern Conference Second Round vs. (A2) Tampa Bay Lightning: Tampa Bay wins 4–2
#	Date	Visitor	Score	Home	OT	Decision	Attendance	Series	Recap
1	May 1	Tampa Bay	2–1	Montreal	2OT	Price	21,287	0–1	Recap
2	May 3	Tampa Bay	6–2	Montreal		Price	21,287	0–2	Recap
3	May 6	Montreal	1–2	Tampa Bay		Price	19,204	0–3	Recap
4	May 7	Montreal	6–2	Tampa Bay		Price	19,204	1–3	Recap
5	May 9	Tampa Bay	1–2	Montreal		Price	21,287	2–3	Recap
6	May 12	Montreal	1–4	Tampa Bay		Price	19,204	2–4	Recap

Legend: Win Loss * denotes if needed

== Player statistics ==
Final

=== Skaters ===
Regular season
Player	GP	G	A	Pts	+/−	PIM
Max Pacioretty	80	37	30	67	38	32
Tomas Plekanec	82	26	34	60	8	46
P. K. Subban	82	15	45	60	21	74
Andrei Markov	81	10	40	50	22	38
David Desharnais	82	14	34	48	22	24
Brendan Gallagher	82	24	23	47	18	31
Alex Galchenyuk	80	20	26	46	8	39
Dale Weise	79	10	19	29	21	34
Lars Eller	77	15	12	27	−6	42
P. A. Parenteau	56	8	14	22	0	30
Brandon Prust	82	4	14	18	6	134
Jiri Sekac^{‡}	50	7	9	16	−3	18
Alexei Emelin	68	3	11	14	5	59
Sergei Gonchar^{†}	45	1	12	13	7	16
Tom Gilbert	72	4	8	12	10	30
Nathan Beaulieu	64	1	8	9	6	45
Jeff Petry^{†}	19	3	4	7	−3	10
Jacob de la Rose	33	4	2	6	−5	12
Michael Bournival	29	3	2	5	3	4
Manny Malhotra	58	1	3	4	−6	12
Mike Weaver	31	0	4	4	0	6
Sven Andrighetto	12	2	1	3	0	0
Devante Smith-Pelly^{†}	20	1	2	3	−2	12
Jarred Tinordi	13	0	2	2	−5	19
Rene Bourque^{‡}	13	0	2	2	−9	6
Christian Thomas	18	1	0	1	−2	7
Bryan Allen^{†}	5	0	1	1	−2	2
Torrey Mitchell^{†}	14	0	1	1	−2	8
Eric Tangradi	7	0	0	0	−3	17
Drayson Bowman	3	0	0	0	0	0
Greg Pateryn	17	0	0	0	0	6
Gabriel Dumont	3	0	0	0	−1	0
Brian Flynn^{†}	9	0	0	0	−2	0
Travis Moen^{‡}	10	0	0	0	0	4

Playoffs
Player	GP	G	A	Pts	+/−	PIM
P. K. Subban	12	1	7	8	1	31
Max Pacioretty	11	5	2	7	2	16
Brendan Gallagher	12	3	2	5	5	0
Tom Gilbert	12	2	3	5	5	14
Torrey Mitchell	12	1	4	5	4	6
Tomas Plekanec	12	1	3	4	3	6
Brandon Prust	12	1	3	4	1	35
Alex Galchenyuk	12	1	3	4	1	10
Jeff Petry	12	2	1	3	2	4
Dale Weise	12	2	1	3	3	16
David Desharnais	11	1	2	3	−1	4
Lars Eller	12	1	2	3	0	4
Devante Smith-Pelly	12	1	2	3	−1	2
Brian Flynn	6	1	2	3	−1	0
Greg Pateryn	7	0	3	3	2	0
Andrei Markov	12	1	1	2	−1	8
P. A. Parenteau	8	1	1	2	0	2
Alexei Emelin	12	0	2	2	1	10
Nathan Beaulieu	5	0	1	1	1	0
Jacob de la Rose	12	0	0	0	0	4

=== Goaltenders ===
Regular season
Player	GP	GS	TOI	W	L	OT	GA	GAA	SA	SV%	SO	G	A	PIM
Carey Price	66	66	3977	44	16	6	130	1.96	1953	.933	9	0	1	4
Dustin Tokarski	17	16	1005	6	6	4	46	2.75	509	.910	0	0	1	0

Playoffs
Player	GP	GS	TOI	W	L	GA	GAA	SA	SV%	SO	G	A	PIM
Carey Price	12	12	752	6	6	28	2.23	352	.920	1	0	0	2

^{†}Denotes player spent time with another team before joining the Canadiens. Stats reflect time with the Canadiens only.
^{‡}Denotes player was traded mid-season. Stats reflect time with the Canadiens only.
Bold/italics denotes franchise record

== Suspensions/fines ==
Player	Explanation	Length	Salary	Date issued
Alexei Emelin	Illegal check to head of Buffalo Sabres forward Brian Gionta during NHL Game No. 337 in Buffalo on Friday, November 28, 2014, at 18:06 of the third period.	–	$11,021.51	November 29, 2014
P. K. Subban	Diving/Embellishment during NHL Game No. 712 in New York on Thursday, January 29, 2015, at 13:05 of the first period.	–	$2,000.00	February 4, 2015
P. K. Subban	Diving/Embellishment during NHL Game No. 1005 in Montreal on Thursday, March 12, 2015, at 0:53 of the second period.	–	$3,000.00	March 20, 2015
Brandon Prust	Derogatory public comments directed toward Referee Brad Watson on Sunday, May 3, 2015.	–	$5,000.00	May 5, 2015

== Awards and honours ==
=== Awards ===
Regular season
Player	Award	Awarded
T. Plekanec	NHL First Star of the Week	October 13, 2014
C. Price	NHL Second Star of the Week	November 17, 2014
C. Price	NHL Third Star of the Week	January 5, 2015
C. Price	NHL All-Star game selection	January 10, 2015
C. Price	NHL First Star of the Week	February 2, 2015
D. Desharnais	NHL Third Star of the Week	February 9, 2015
M. Pacioretty	NHL Third Star of the Week	February 23, 2015
C. Price	NHL Second Star of the Month	March 1, 2015
P. K. Subban	NHL Second Star of the Week	March 2, 2015
C. Price	Hart Memorial Trophy; Vezina Trophy; Ted Lindsay Award	June 24, 2015

=== Milestones ===
Regular season
Player	Milestone	Reached
J. Sekac	1st Career NHL Game	October 8, 2014
J. Sekac	1st Career NHL Goal; 1st Career NHL Point	October 16, 2014
P. Parenteau	300th Career NHL Game	October 27, 2014
L. Eller	300th Career NHL Game	November 5, 2014
J. Sekac	1st Career NHL Assist	November 8, 2014
P. Subban	300th Career NHL Game	November 11, 2014
S. Gonchar	800th Career NHL Point	November 15, 2014
T. Plekanec	700th Career NHL Game	November 20, 2014
A. Markov	100th Career NHL Goal	November 22, 2014
D. Weise	200th Career NHL Game	November 28, 2014
S. Andrighetto	1st Career NHL Game; 1st Career NHL Goal; 1st Career NHL Point	December 6, 2014
B. Prust	400th Career NHL Game	December 12, 2014
A. Galchenyuk	1st Career NHL Hat-trick	December 16, 2014
B. Prust	100th Career NHL Point	December 20, 2014
A. Markov	800th Career NHL Game	December 23, 2014
C. Price	400th Career NHL Game; 200th Career NHL Win	January 2, 2015
A. Emelin	200th Career NHL Game	January 2, 2015
D. Desharnais	300th Career NHL Game	January 15, 2015
J. De la Rose	1st Career NHL Game	February 3, 2015
C. Thomas	1st Career NHL Goal; 1st Career NHL Point	February 12, 2015
J. De la Rose	1st Career NHL Assist; 1st Career NHL Point	February 12, 2015
B. Gallagher	100th Career NHL Point	February 19, 2015
J. De la Rose	1st Career NHL Goal	February 26, 2015
D. Desharnais	200th Career NHL Point	February 28, 2015
S. Gonchar	1,300th Career NHL Game	March 12, 2015
A. Galchenyuk	100th Career NHL Point	March 21, 2015
T. Plekanec	200th Career NHL Goal	April 4, 2015

Playoffs
Player	Milestone	Reached
B. Flynn	1st Career Playoff Game; 1st Career Playoff Goal; 1st Career Playoff Assist; 1st Career Playoff Point	April 15, 2015
J. Petry	1st Career Playoff Game	April 15, 2015
J. De la Rose	1st Career Playoff Game	April 15, 2015
G. Pateryn	1st Career Playoff Game	April 22, 2015
G. Pateryn	1st Career Playoff Assist; 1st Career Playoff Point	April 24, 2015
J. Petry	1st Career Playoff Goal; 1st Career Playoff Point	May 3, 2015
J. Petry	1st Career Playoff Assist	May 9, 2015

== Transactions ==
The Canadiens have been involved in the following transactions during the 2014–15 season:

=== Trades ===
Date	Details	
June 28, 2014	To Arizona Coyotes 3rd-round pick in 2014; 4th-round pick in 2014	To Montreal Canadiens 3rd-round pick in 2014
June 30, 2014	To Colorado Avalanche Daniel Briere	To Montreal Canadiens P. A. Parenteau; 5th-round pick in 2015
July 1, 2014	To Buffalo Sabres Josh Gorges	To Montreal Canadiens MIN's 2nd-round pick in 2016
October 5, 2014	To Winnipeg Jets Peter Budaj; Patrick Holland	To Montreal Canadiens Eric Tangradi
November 11, 2014	To Dallas Stars Travis Moen	To Montreal Canadiens Sergei Gonchar
November 20, 2014	To Anaheim Ducks Rene Bourque	To Montreal Canadiens Bryan Allen
February 24, 2015	To Anaheim Ducks Jiri Sekac	To Montreal Canadiens Devante Smith-Pelly
March 2, 2015	To Edmonton Oilers 2nd-round pick in 2015; Conditional 5th-round pick in 2015	To Montreal Canadiens Jeff Petry
March 2, 2015	To Buffalo Sabres 5th-round pick in 2016	To Montreal Canadiens Brian Flynn
March 2, 2015	To Buffalo Sabres Jack Nevins; 7th-round pick in 2016	To Montreal Canadiens Torrey Mitchell

=== Free agents acquired ===
Date	Player	Former team	Contract terms (in U.S. dollars)	Ref
July 1, 2014	Manny Malhotra	Carolina Hurricanes	1 year, $850,000	
July 1, 2014	Tom Gilbert	Florida Panthers	2 years, $5.6 million	
July 1, 2014	Jiri Sekac	HC Lev Praha	2 years, $2.7 million	
July 1, 2014	Joey MacDonald	Calgary Flames	1 year, $600,000	
October 2, 2014	Drayson Bowman	Carolina Hurricanes	1 year, $575,000	

=== Free agents lost ===
Date	Player	New team	Contract terms (in U.S. dollars)	Ref
June 3, 2014	Joonas Nattinen	Modo Hockey	1 year	
July 1, 2014	Thomas Vanek	Minnesota Wild	3 years, $19.5 million	
July 1, 2014	Brian Gionta	Buffalo Sabres	3 years, $12.75 million	
July 1, 2014	Mike Blunden	Tampa Bay Lightning	1 year, $600,000	
July 1, 2014	Devan Dubnyk	Arizona Coyotes	1 year, $800,000	
July 3, 2014	Nick Tarnasky	New York Rangers	2 years, two-way contract	
July 24, 2014	Martin St. Pierre	KHL Medveščak Zagreb	1 year	
August 7, 2014	Ryan White	Philadelphia Flyers	1 year, $575,000	
September 25, 2014	Robert Czarnik	Indy Fuel	1 year	
October 14, 2014	Francis Bouillon	HC Ambrì-Piotta	1 year	
January 20, 2015	Douglas Murray	Kölner Haie	1 year	

=== Player signings ===
Date	Player	Contract terms (in U.S. dollars)	Ref
July 1, 2014	Mike Weaver	1 year, $1.75 million contract extension	
July 1, 2014	Jeremy Gregoire	3 years, $1.86 million entry-level contract	
July 21, 2014	Nikita Scherbak	3 years, $3.625 million entry-level contract	
July 24, 2014	Lars Eller	4 years, $14 million contract extension	
August 2, 2014	P. K. Subban	8 years, $72 million contract extension	
November 29, 2014	Brendan Gallagher	6 years, $22.5 million contract extension	
December 19, 2014	Brett Lernout	3 years, $2.055 million entry-level contract	
April 12, 2015	Mark MacMillan	2 years, entry-level contract	
June 1, 2015	Gabriel Dumont	1-year, two-way contract extension	
June 1, 2015	Morgan Ellis	1 year, two-way contract extension	
June 2, 2015	Jeff Petry	6 years, $33 million contract extension	
June 13, 2015	Nathan Beaulieu	2 years, $4 million contract extension	
June 15, 2015	Torrey Mitchell	3 years, $3.6 million contract extension	

== Draft picks ==
Below are the Montreal Canadiens' selections made at the 2014 NHL entry draft, held on June 27–28, 2014 at the Wells Fargo Center in Philadelphia.

Round	#	Player	Pos	Nationality	College/Junior/Club team (League)
1	26	Nikita Scherbak	RW	Russia	Saskatoon Blades (WHL)
3	73 ^{b}	Brett Lernout	D	Canada	Swift Current Broncos (WHL)
5	125 ^{a}	Nikolas Koberstein	D	Canada	Olds Grizzlys (AJHL)
5	147	Daniel Audette	C	Canada	Sherbrooke Phoenix (QMJHL)
6	177	Hayden Hawkey	G	United States	Omaha Lancers (USHL)
7	207	Jake Evans	C	Canada	St. Michael's Buzzers (OJHL)

=== Notes ===
- ^{a} The New York Islanders' fifth-round pick went to the Montreal Canadiens as the result of a trade on March 5, 2014 that sent Sebastian Collberg and a conditional second-round pick in 2014 to New York, in exchange for Thomas Vanek and this pick (being conditional at the time of the trade). The condition – Montreal would receive a fifth-round pick in 2014 if Montreal qualified for the 2014 Stanley Cup playoffs – was converted on April 1, 2014.
- ^{b} The Arizona Coyotes' third-round pick went to the Montreal Canadiens as the result of a trade on June 28, 2014 that sent a third and fourth-round pick in 2014 (87th and 117th overall) to Arizona in exchange for this pick.
