= Frédéric St-Denis =

Canadian ice hockey defenceman

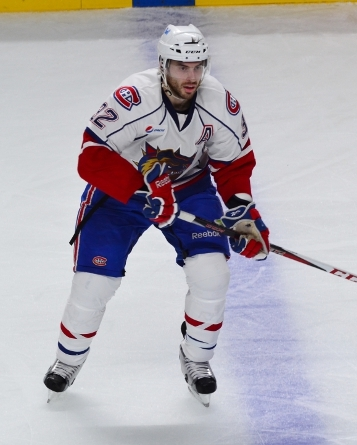
- Frédéric Saint-Denis, in a game played at the Bell Center in Montréal
- Born: January 23, 1986 (age 40) Greenfield Park, Quebec, Canada
- Height: 5 ft 11 in (180 cm)
- Weight: 190 lb (86 kg; 13 st 8 lb)
- Position: Defence
- Shoots: Left
- team Former teams: Free Agent; Montreal Canadiens; Columbus Blue Jackets; EHC München
- NHL draft: Undrafted
- Playing career: 2008–present

Frédéric St-Denis (born January 23, 1986) is a Canadian defenceman in ice hockey. He is currently an unrestricted free agent, having last played for EHC München in Germany's Deutsche Eishockey Liga (DEL).

== Playing career ==
During his rookie professional season in 2008–09, St. Denis mainly played for the Cincinnati Cyclones in the ECHL, and in the 2009–10 season, he suited up for the Hamilton Bulldogs in the AHL. On July 1, 2010, he signed a one-year contract as a free agent with the Montreal Canadiens, the NHL affiliate of the Bulldogs.

On July 15, 2011, St-Denis agreed to a one-year, two-way contract extension with the Montreal Canadiens. Throughout the 2011–12 campaign, St-Denis was called up from the minors to join the Canadiens' NHL roster. During this period, he achieved a significant milestone by scoring his first career NHL goal on December 8, 2011, in a game against the Vancouver Canucks, where he beat the veteran goaltender Roberto Luongo.

On July 7, 2013, after his tenure with the Canadiens organization came to an end as a free agent, St-Denis signed a one-year, two-way contract with the Columbus Blue Jackets. During his time with the Blue Jackets organization, he assumed a leadership role as the alternate captain of their AHL affiliate team, the Springfield Falcons.

After completing two seasons within the Blue Jackets organization, St-Denis became a free agent and decided to take his career overseas. On August 11, 2015, he signed his first international contract, agreeing to a one-year deal with EHC München, a team competing in Germany's top professional league, the Deutsche Eishockey Liga (DEL).

== Career statistics ==
| | | | Regular season | | | | | Playoffs |
| Season | Team | League | GP | G | A | Pts | PIM | GP | G | A | Pts | PIM |
|---|---|---|---|---|---|---|---|---|---|---|---|---|
| 2002–03 | Drummondville Voltigeurs | QMJHL | 14 | 0 | 0 | 0 | 0 | — | — | — | — | — |
| 2003–04 | Drummondville Voltigeurs | QMJHL | 67 | 7 | 10 | 17 | 30 | 5 | 0 | 1 | 1 | 2 |
| 2004–05 | Drummondville Voltigeurs | QMJHL | 70 | 11 | 22 | 33 | 36 | 6 | 2 | 3 | 5 | 0 |
| 2005–06 | Drummondville Voltigeurs | QMJHL | 69 | 17 | 50 | 67 | 74 | 7 | 2 | 2 | 4 | 6 |
| 2006–07 | Drummondville Voltigeurs | QMJHL | 65 | 9 | 29 | 38 | 59 | 12 | 1 | 7 | 8 | 8 |
| 2007–08 | University of Quebec | CIS | 28 | 4 | 14 | 18 | 4 | — | — | — | — | — |
| 2008–09 | Hamilton Bulldogs | AHL | 7 | 1 | 1 | 2 | 6 | — | — | — | — | — |
| 2008–09 | Cincinnati Cyclones | ECHL | 41 | 1 | 22 | 23 | 22 | 15 | 0 | 5 | 5 | 14 |
| 2009–10 | Hamilton Bulldogs | AHL | 59 | 3 | 14 | 17 | 38 | 19 | 0 | 1 | 1 | 20 |
| 2010–11 | Hamilton Bulldogs | AHL | 76 | 5 | 18 | 23 | 34 | 20 | 1 | 9 | 10 | 12 |
| 2011–12 | Hamilton Bulldogs | AHL | 58 | 3 | 25 | 28 | 18 | — | — | — | — | — |
| 2011–12 | Montreal Canadiens | NHL | 17 | 1 | 2 | 3 | 10 | — | — | — | — | — |
| 2012–13 | Hamilton Bulldogs | AHL | 63 | 7 | 11 | 18 | 24 | — | — | — | — | — |
| 2013–14 | Springfield Falcons | AHL | 60 | 9 | 17 | 26 | 32 | 5 | 0 | 2 | 2 | 0 |
| 2014–15 | Springfield Falcons | AHL | 59 | 3 | 17 | 20 | 32 | — | — | — | — | — |
| 2014–15 | Columbus Blue Jackets | NHL | 4 | 0 | 1 | 1 | 0 | — | — | — | — | — |
| 2015–16 | EHC München | DEL | 46 | 3 | 13 | 16 | 24 | 13 | 0 | 2 | 2 | 8 |
| NHL totals | | | 21 | 1 | 3 | 4 | 10 | — | — | — | — | — |
