= 2014–15 St. Louis Blues season =

National Hockey League team season

2014–15 St. Louis Blues
- Central Division champions
- Division: 1st Central
- Conference: 2nd Western
- 2014–15 record: 51–24–7
- Home record: 27–12–2
- Road record: 24–12–5
- Goals for: 248
- Goals against: 201

Team information
- General manager: Doug Armstrong
- Coach: Ken Hitchcock
- Captain: David Backes
- Alternate captains: Barret Jackman; T. J. Oshie; Alex Pietrangelo; Alexander Steen
- Arena: Scottrade Center
- Average attendance: 18,545 (96.8%) (41 games)
- Minor league affiliates: Chicago Wolves (AHL); Kalamazoo Wings (ECHL)

Team leaders
- Goals: Vladimir Tarasenko (37)
- Assists: Alexander Steen (40)
- Points: Vladimir Tarasenko (73)
- Penalty minutes: Ryan Reaves (116)
- Plus/minus: Vladimir Tarasenko (+27)
- Wins: Brian Elliott (26)
- Goals against average: Brian Elliott (2.26)

The 2014–15 St. Louis Blues season was the 48th season for the National Hockey League (NHL) franchise that was established on June 5, 1967.

== Off-season ==
Coach Ken Hitchcock was extended through this season on May 7, 2014, as were Associate Coach Brad Shaw and Assistant Coach Ray Bennett. Assistant Coach Gary Shaw and Goaltending Coach Corey Hirsch were not retained. Kirk Muller, 48, was named assistant coach by General Manager Doug Armstrong on May 13, 2014. Muller was formerly head coach of the Carolina Hurricanes in parts of the last three seasons.

Goaltender Brian Elliott re-signed for a three-year extension on May 19, 2014, for $7.5 million. He will team with Jake Allen. Ryan Miller will become an unrestricted free agent in July.

The Blues on May 27, replaced their unretained goaltending coach with Jim Corsi, formerly goaltending coach of the last 16 seasons with the Buffalo Sabres.

== Playoffs ==
The St. Louis Blues entered the playoffs as the Central Division regular season champions. The Blues took on the wild card Minnesota Wild in the first round. The Blues were defeated in six games by the Wild.

== Standings ==
Central Division
Pos	Team	GP	W	L	OTL	ROW	GF	GA	GD	Pts
1	y – St. Louis Blues	82	51	24	7	42	248	201	+47	109
2	x – Nashville Predators	82	47	25	10	41	232	208	+24	104
3	x – Chicago Blackhawks	82	48	28	6	39	229	189	+40	102
4	x – Minnesota Wild	82	46	28	8	42	231	201	+30	100
5	x – Winnipeg Jets	82	43	26	13	36	230	210	+20	99
6	Dallas Stars	82	41	31	10	37	261	260	+1	92
7	Colorado Avalanche	82	39	31	12	29	219	227	−8	90

Source: National Hockey League
x – Clinched playoff spot; y – Clinched division

== Schedule and results ==
=== Pre-season ===
2014 preseason game log: 2–3–2 (home: 2–2–0; road: 0–1–2)
#	Date	Visitor	Score	Home	OT	Decision	Attendance	Record	Recap
1	September 21	St. Louis	3–4	Columbus	OT	Allen	11,722	0–0–1	Recap
2	September 22	St. Louis	3–4	Dallas		Lundstrom	14,567	0–1–1	Recap
3	September 25	Columbus	5–4	St. Louis		Elliott	11,598	0–2–1	Recap
4^{[a]}	September 27	Dallas	4–2	St. Louis		Allen		0–3–1	Recap
5	September 30	Carolina	1–3	St. Louis		Elliott	10,213	1–3–1	Recap
6	October 2	Minnesota	1–4	St. Louis		Allen	12,103	2–3–1	Recap
7	October 4	St. Louis	4–5	Minnesota	OT	Elliott	17,342	2–3–2	Recap
Notes:^{a} Game was played at Sprint Center in Kansas City, Missouri.

=== Regular season ===
2014–15 Game Log

October: 5–3–1 (home: 3–2–0; road: 2–1–1)
#	Date	Visitor	Score	Home	OT	Decision	Attendance	Record	Pts	Recap
1	October 9	NY Rangers	3–2	St. Louis		Elliott	19,183	0–1–0	0	Recap
2	October 11	Calgary	1–4	St. Louis		Elliott	17,120	1–1–0	2	Recap
3	October 16	St. Louis	0–1	Los Angeles	SO	Elliott	18,230	1–1–1	3	Recap
4	October 18	St. Louis	6–1	Arizona		Allen	11,100	2–1–1	5	Recap
5	October 19	St. Louis	0–3	Anaheim		Elliott	15,687	2–2–1	5	Recap
6	October 23	Vancouver	4–1	St. Louis		Allen	16,099	2–3–1	5	Recap
7	October 25	Chicago	2–3	St. Louis		Elliott	19,434	3–3–1	7	Recap
8	October 28	St. Louis	4–3	Dallas	OT	Elliott	16,232	4–3–1	9	Recap
9	October 30	Anaheim	0–2	St. Louis		Allen	16,723	5–3–1	11	Recap

November: 11–3–1 (home: 6–1–1; road: 5–2–0)
#	Date	Visitor	Score	Home	OT	Decision	Attendance	Record	Pts	Recap
10	November 1	Colorado	2–3	St. Louis	SO	Elliott	17,498	6–3–1	13	Recap
11	November 3	St. Louis	4–3	NY Rangers	SO	Elliott	18,006	7–3–1	15	Recap
12	November 4	St. Louis	1–0	New Jersey		Allen	15,102	8–3–1	17	Recap
13	November 6	New Jersey	3–4	St. Louis		Allen	16,523	9–3–1	19	Recap
14	November 8	Nashville	2–1	St. Louis		Elliott	18,869	9–4–1	19	Recap
15	November 11	Buffalo	1–6	St. Louis		Elliott	17,570	10–4–1	21	Recap
16	November 13	Nashville	3–4	St. Louis		Allen	15,702	11–4–1	23	Recap
17	November 15	Washington	1–4	St. Louis		Elliott	19,339	12–4–1	25	Recap
18	November 18	St. Louis	0–2	Boston		Elliott	17,565	12–5–1	25	Recap
19	November 20	St. Louis	1–4	Montreal		Allen	21,287	12–6–1	25	Recap
20	November 22	St. Louis	3–2	Ottawa		Elliott	18,479	13–6–1	27	Recap
21	November 23	St. Louis	4–2	Winnipeg		Allen	15,006	14–6–1	29	Recap
22	November 25	Ottawa	3–2	St. Louis	SO	Allen	16,680	14–6–2	30	Recap
23	November 28	Edmonton	3–4	St. Louis	OT	Allen	17,666	15–6–2	32	Recap
24	November 29	St. Louis	3–2	Minnesota	SO	Allen	19,124	16–6–2	34	Recap

December: 6–6–1 (home: 4–1–0; road: 2–5–1)
#	Date	Visitor	Score	Home	OT	Decision	Attendance	Record	Pts	Recap
25	December 3	St. Louis	1–4	Chicago		Allen	21,514	16–7–2	34	Recap
26	December 4	St. Louis	3–4	Nashville		Brodeur	16,409	16–8–2	34	Recap
27	December 6	St. Louis	6–4	NY Islanders		Brodeur	16,170	17–8–2	36	Recap
28	December 8	Florida	2–4	St. Louis		Brodeur	17,330	18–8–2	38	Recap
29	December 11	NY Islanders	3–6	St. Louis		Allen	18,028	19–8–2	40	Recap
30	December 13	St. Louis	3–2	Colorado	OT	Allen	17,806	20–8–2	42	Recap
31	December 16	Los Angeles	2–5	St. Louis		Allen	17,212	21–8–2	44	Recap
32	December 18	St. Louis	4–6	Los Angeles		Brodeur	18,230	21–9–2	44	Recap
33	December 20	St. Louis	2–3	San Jose	OT	Allen	17,562	21–9–3	45	Recap
34	December 23	St. Louis	0–5	Colorado		Allen	17,634	21–10–3	45	Recap
35	December 27	Dallas	4–3	St. Louis		Allen	19,683	21–11–3	45	Recap
36	December 29	Colorado	0–3	St. Louis		Brodeur	19,749	22–11–3	47	Recap
37	December 30	St. Louis	2–3	Nashville		Elliott	17,401	22–12–3	47	Recap

January: 9–1–1 (home: 6–0–1; road: 3–1–0)
#	Date	Visitor	Score	Home	OT	Decision	Attendance	Record	Pts	Recap
38	January 2	St. Louis	3–4	Anaheim		Brodeur	17,174	22–13–3	47	Recap
39	January 3	St. Louis	7–2	San Jose		Elliott	17,562	23–13–3	49	Recap
40	January 6	St. Louis	6–0	Arizona		Elliott	10,876	24–13–3	51	Recap
41	January 8	San Jose	2–7	St. Louis		Elliott	19,220	25–13–3	53	Recap
42	January 10	Carolina	4–5	St. Louis	SO	Allen	19,411	26–13–3	55	Recap
43	January 13	Edmonton	2–4	St. Louis		Allen	18,279	27–13–3	57	Recap
44	January 15	Detroit	3–2	St. Louis	OT	Elliott	18,543	27–13–4	58	Recap
45	January 17	Toronto	0–3	St. Louis		Elliott	19,626	28–13–4	60	Recap
46	January 19	Colorado	1–3	St. Louis		Elliott	19,187	29–13–4	62	Recap
47	January 29	Nashville	4–5	St. Louis	SO	Elliott	19,477	30–13–4	64	Recap
48	January 30	St. Louis	3–2	Carolina	SO	Allen	13,287	31–13–4	66	Recap

February: 9–5–0 (home: 3–4–0; road: 6–1–0)
#	Date	Visitor	Score	Home	OT	Decision	Attendance	Record	Pts	Recap
49	February 1	St. Louis	4–3	Washington		Elliott	18,506	32–13–4	68	Recap
50	February 3	Tampa Bay	1–2	St. Louis	OT	Elliott	17,223	33–13–4	70	Recap
51	February 5	St. Louis	3–0	Buffalo		Allen	18,912	34–13–4	72	Recap
52	February 6	St. Louis	1–7	Columbus		Elliott	16,321	34–14–4	72	Recap
53	February 8	Chicago	4–2	St. Louis		Elliott	19,657	34–15–4	72	Recap
54	February 10	Arizona	1–2	St. Louis		Allen	17,312	35–15–4	74	Recap
55	February 12	St. Louis	6–3	Tampa Bay		Elliott	18,926	36–15–4	76	Recap
56	February 15	St. Louis	2–1	Florida	SO	Elliott	11,859	37–15–4	78	Recap
57	February 17	Dallas	4–1	St. Louis		Elliott	18,830	37–16–4	78	Recap
58	February 20	Boston	1–5	St. Louis		Allen	19,172	38–16–4	80	Recap
59	February 21	Pittsburgh	4–2	St. Louis		Elliott	19,621	38–17–4	80	Recap
60	February 24	Montreal	5–2	St. Louis		Allen	19,383	38–18–4	80	Recap
61	February 26	St. Louis	2–1	Winnipeg	SO	Elliott	15,016	39–18–4	82	Recap
62	February 28	St. Louis	2–1	Edmonton		Elliott	16,839	40–18–4	84	Recap

March: 6–5–3 (home: 2–3–0; road: 4–2–3)
#	Date	Visitor	Score	Home	OT	Decision	Attendance	Record	Pts	Recap
63	March 1	St. Louis	5–6	Vancouver	SO	Allen	18,870	40–18–5	85	Recap
64	March 5	St. Louis	1–3	Philadelphia		Elliott	12,531	40–19–5	85	Recap
65	March 7	St. Louis	6–1	Toronto		Elliott	19,108	41–19–5	87	Recap
66	March 10	Winnipeg	4–5	St. Louis		Elliott	19,297	42–19–5	89	Recap
67	March 12	Philadelphia	0–1	St. Louis	SO	Elliott	19,600	43–19–5	91	Recap
68	March 14	Minnesota	3–1	St. Louis		Elliott	19,638	43–20–5	91	Recap
69	March 15	St. Louis	3–0	Dallas		Allen	18,532	44–20–5	93	Recap
70	March 17	St. Louis	4–0	Calgary		Elliott	19,289	45–20–5	95	Recap
71	March 19	St. Louis	1–2	Winnipeg	SO	Elliott	15,016	45–20–6	96	Recap
72	March 21	St. Louis	3–6	Minnesota		Elliott	19,204	45–21–6	96	Recap
73	March 22	St. Louis	1–2	Detroit	OT	Allen	20,027	45–21–7	97	Recap
74	March 24	St. Louis	3–2	Pittsburgh	OT	Allen	18,631	46–21–7	99	Recap
75	March 28	Columbus	4–2	St. Louis		Elliott	19,431	46–22–7	99	Recap
76	March 30	Vancouver	4–1	St. Louis		Elliott	19,204	46–23–7	99	Recap

April: 5–1–0 (home: 3–1–0; road: 2–0–0)
#	Date	Visitor	Score	Home	OT	Decision	Attendance	Record	Pts	Recap
77	April 2	Calgary	1–4	St. Louis		Allen	19,308	47–23–7	101	Recap
78	April 3	St. Louis	7–5	Dallas		Elliott	18,532	48–23–7	103	Recap
79	April 5	St. Louis	2–1	Chicago		Allen	22,017	49–23–7	105	Recap
80	April 7	Winnipeg	1–0	St. Louis		Allen	19,616	49–24–7	105	Recap
81	April 9	Chicago	1–2	St. Louis		Allen	19,751	50–24–7	107	Recap
82	April 11	Minnesota	2–4	St. Louis		Elliott	19,155	51–24–7	109	Recap

Legend: Win (2 points) Loss (0 points) Overtime/shootout loss (1 point)

=== Playoffs ===
2015 Stanley Cup Playoffs

Western Conference First Round vs. (WC1) Minnesota Wild: Minnesota wins 4–2
#	Date	Visitor	Score	Home	OT	Decision	Attendance	Series	Recap
1	April 16	Minnesota	4–2	St. Louis		Allen	19,671	0–1	Recap
2	April 18	Minnesota	1–4	St. Louis		Allen	19,243	1–1	Recap
3	April 20	St. Louis	0–3	Minnesota		Allen	19,165	1–2	Recap
4	April 22	St. Louis	6–1	Minnesota		Allen	19,390	2–2	Recap
5	April 24	Minnesota	4–1	St. Louis		Allen	19,653	2–3	Recap
6	April 26	St. Louis	1–4	Minnesota		Allen	19,318	2–4	Recap

Legend: Win Loss

== Player statistics ==
Final Stats

=== Skaters ===
Regular season
Player	GP	G	A	Pts	+/−	PIM
Vladimir Tarasenko	77	**37**	36	**73**	**27**	31
Alexander Steen	74	24	**40**	64	8	33
Jaden Schwartz	75	28	35	63	13	16
David Backes	80	26	32	58	7	104
T. J. Oshie	72	19	36	55	17	51
Paul Stastny	74	16	30	46	5	40
Alex Pietrangelo	**81**	7	39	46	−2	28
Kevin Shattenkirk	56	8	36	44	19	52
Jori Lehtera	75	14	30	44	21	48
Patrik Berglund	77	12	15	27	−2	26
Dmitrij Jaskin	54	13	5	18	7	16
Barret Jackman	80	2	13	15	3	47
Jay Bouwmeester	72	2	11	13	7	24
Steve Ott	78	3	9	12	−8	86
Ryan Reaves	**81**	6	6	12	−3	**116**
Carl Gunnarsson	61	2	10	12	10	2
Chris Butler	33	3	6	9	8	23
Ian Cole^{‡} (traded on 3/2/15)	54	4	5	9	16	44
Maxim Lapierre^{‡} (traded on 1/27/15)	45	2	7	9	−2	16
Joakim Lindstrom^{‡} (traded on 3/2/15)	34	3	3	6	−8	8
Zbynek Michalek^{†} (acquired on 3/2/15)	15	2	2	4	3	6
Olli Jokinen^{†} (acquired on 3/2/15)	8	1	2	3	3	0
Marcel Goc^{†} (acquired on 1/27/15)	31	1	2	3	−1	4
Petteri Lindbohm	23	2	1	3	−1	26
Chris Porter	24	1	1	2	−3	6
Robert Bortuzzo^{†} (acquired on 3/2/15)	13	1	1	2	−3	25
Ty Rattie	11	0	2	2	0	2
Magnus Paajarvi	10	0	1	1	−2	6
Colin Fraser	1	0	0	0	−1	0
Jordan Leopold^{‡} (traded on 11/15/14)	7	0	0	0	0	2

^{‡}Traded away mid-season, date in ( ). Stats reflect time with Blues only.
^{†}Denotes player spent time with another team before joining Blues, acquired date in ( ). Stats reflect time with Blues only.
**Bold** = leading team in category.

Playoffs
Player	GP	G	A	Pts	+/−	PIM
Kevin Shattenkirk	6	0	8	8	2	2
Vladimir Tarasenko	6	6	1	7	−4	0
Alexander Steen	6	1	3	4	−3	2
Patrik Berglund	6	2	2	4	4	0
Jaden Schwartz	6	1	2	3	−2	0
David Backes	6	1	1	2	2	2
T. J. Oshie	6	1	1	2	−3	0
Alex Pietrangelo	6	0	2	2	1	0
Jori Lehtera	5	0	2	2	−2	0
Chris Porter	3	0	1	1	1	0
Paul Stastny	6	1	0	1	−3	4
Ryan Reaves	6	1	0	1	1	0
Dmitrij Jaskin	6	0	1	1	1	2
Barret Jackman	6	0	0	0	−1	4
Steve Ott	6	0	0	0	0	26
Marcel Goc	4	0	0	0	−1	0
Zbynek Michalek	6	0	0	0	−2	4
Jay Bouwmeester	6	0	0	0	−1	2
Carl Gunnarsson	6	0	0	0	1	0

=== Goaltenders ===
Regular season
Player	GP	GS	TOI	W	L	OT	GA	GAA	SA	SV%	SO	G	A	PIM
Brian Elliott	46	45	2546	26	14	3	96	2.26	1150	.917	5	0	3	0
Jake Allen	37	32	2077	22	7	4	79	2.28	909	.913	4	0	2	2
Martin Brodeur	7	5	356	3	3	0	17	2.87	169	.899	1	0	0	0
Totals	53	49	2,981	32	13	4	117	2.35	1,346	.913	6	0	2	2

Playoffs
Player	GP	GS	TOI	W	L	GA	GAA	SA	SV%	SO	G	A	PIM
Jake Allen	6	6	328	2	4	12	2.20	125	.904	0	0	0	0
Brian Elliott	1	0	26	0	0	1	2.31	7	.857	0	0	0	0

== Awards and honours ==
=== Awards ===
Regular season
Player	Award	Awarded
V. Tarasenko	NHL First Star of the Week	November 3, 2014
V. Tarasenko	NHL Third Star of the Week	November 10, 2014
J. Lehtera	NHL First Star of the Week	November 17, 2014
V. Tarasenko	NHL Second Star of the Month	December 1, 2014
T. Oshie	NHL First Star of the Week	January 5, 2015
V. Tarasenko	NHL All-Star game selection	January 10, 2015
K. Shattenkirk	NHL All-Star game selection	January 10, 2015
D. Backes	NHL First Star of the Week	January 12, 2015
B. Elliott	NHL All-Star game replacement selection	January 22, 2015

=== Milestones ===
Regular season
Player	Milestone	Reached
J. Lehtera	1st Career NHL Game	October 9, 2014
P. Stastny	300th Career NHL Assist	October 11, 2014
J. Lindstrom	100th Career NHL Game	October 16, 2014
S. Ott	700th Career NHL Game	October 18, 2014
D. Backes	200th Career NHL Assist	October 18, 2014
J. Lehtera	1st Career NHL Goal; 1st Career NHL Assist; 1st Career NHL Point	October 18, 2014
P. Lindbohm	1st Career NHL Game	October 19, 2014
R. Reaves	200th Career NHL Game	October 23, 2014
V. Tarasenko	1st Career NHL Hat Trick	October 28, 2014
J. Lehtera	1st Career NHL Hat Trick	November 11, 2014
K. Shattenkirk	300th Career NHL Game	November 18, 2014
D. Backes	600th Career NHL Game	December 20, 2014
V. Tarasenko	200th Career NHL Point	December 27, 2014
T. Oshie	400th Career NHL Game	December 30, 2014
T. Oshie	100th Career NHL Goal	January 3, 2015
J. Schwartz	100th Career NHL Goal	January 3, 2015
A. Steen	400th Career NHL Point	January 13, 2015
A. Pietrangelo	200th Career NHL Point	January 30, 2015
A. Steen	400th Career NHL Game	February 3, 2015
D. Backes	400th Career NHL Point	March 1, 2015
B. Elliott	30th Career NHL Shutout	March 17, 2015
Z. Michalek	700th Career NHL Game	March 19, 2015
P. Stastny	500th Career NHL Point	March 21, 2015
J. Schwartz	200th Career NHL Game	March 28, 2015
T. Oshie	200th Career NHL Assist	April 3, 2015
B. Jackman	800th Career NHL Game	April 5, 2015

Playoffs
Player	Milestone	Reached
J. Lehtera	1st Career Playoff Game	April 16, 2015
D. Jaskin	1st Career Playoff Game	April 16, 2015
V. Tarasenko	1st Career Playoff Assist	April 16, 2015
V. Tarasenko	1st Career Playoff Hat-trick	April 18, 2015
J. Lehtera	1st Career Playoff Assist; 1st Career Playoff Point	April 18, 2015
R. Reaves	1st Career Playoff Goal; 1st Career Playoff Point	April 22, 2015
D. Jaskin	1st Career Playoff Assist; 1st Career Playoff Point	April 22, 2015

== Transactions ==
Following the end of the Blues' 2013–14 season, and during the 2014–15 season, this team has been involved in the following transactions:

=== Trades ===
Date	Details
June 28, 2014	To Toronto Maple Leafs Roman Polak (D)	To St. Louis Blues Carl Gunnarsson (D); CGY's 4th round (94th) pick in 2014
November 15, 2014	To Columbus Blue Jackets Jordan Leopold (D)	To St. Louis Blues 5th-round pick in 2016
January 27, 2015	To Pittsburgh Penguins Maxim Lapierre (C)	To St. Louis Blues Marcel Goc (C)
February 26, 2015	To Columbus Blue Jackets Future Considerations	To St. Louis Blues Adam Cracknell (RW)
March 2, 2015	To Arizona Coyotes Maxim Letunov (F)	To St. Louis Blues Zbynek Michalek (D) conditional 3rd-round pick in 2015
March 2, 2015	To Pittsburgh Penguins Ian Cole (D)	To St. Louis Blues Robert Bortuzzo (D); 7th-round pick in 2016
March 2, 2015	To Toronto Maple Leafs Joakim Lindstrom (F); Conditional 6th-round pick in 2016	To St. Louis Blues Olli Jokinen (F)

=== Free agents acquired ===
Date	Player	Former team	Contract terms (in U.S. dollars)	Ref
July 1, 2014	Paul Stastny (C)	Colorado Avalanche	4 years, $28 million	
July 4, 2014	John McCarthy (F)	San Jose Sharks	1 year, $600,000	
July 16, 2014	Benn Ferriero (C)	Vancouver Canucks	1 year, $600,000	
July 16, 2014	Chris Butler (D)	Calgary Flames	1 year, $650,000	
July 21, 2014	Jeremy Welsh (F)	Vancouver Canucks	1 year, $550,000	
July 21, 2014	Nate Prosser (D)	Minnesota Wild	1 year, $700,000	
July 29, 2014	Peter Mueller (F)	Kloten Flyers	1 year, $700,000	
September 5, 2014	Colin Fraser (C)	Los Angeles Kings	1 year, $650,000	
September 28, 2014	Dmitrii Sergeev (D)	Kitchener Rangers	3 years, $1.87 million entry-level contract	
December 2, 2014	Martin Brodeur (G)	New Jersey Devils	1 year, $700,000	

=== Free agents lost ===
Date	Player	New team	Contract terms (in U.S. dollars)	Ref
July 1, 2014	Ryan Miller (G)	Vancouver Canucks	3 years, $18 million	
July 1, 2014	Adam Cracknell (RW)	Los Angeles Kings	1 year, $600,000	
July 1, 2014	Taylor Chorney (D)	Pittsburgh Penguins	1 year, $550,000	
July 1, 2014	Alexandre Bolduc (F)	Arizona Coyotes	1 year, $600,000	
July 10, 2014	Vladimir Sobotka (F)	Avangard Omsk	3 years, $12 million	
July 11, 2014	Brenden Morrow (LW)	Tampa Bay Lightning	1 year, $1.55 million	
July 15, 2014	Derek Roy (C)	Nashville Predators	1 year, $1 million	

=== Lost via waivers ===
Player	New Team	Date Acquired	Ref
Nate Prosser	Minnesota Wild	October 2, 2014	

=== Lost via retirement ===
Date	Player	Ref
January 29, 2015	Martin Brodeur	

=== Player signings ===
Date	Player	Contract terms (in U.S. dollars)	Ref
June 26, 2014	Patrik Berglund (C)	3 years, $11.1 million contract extension	
July 1, 2014	Phil McRae (C)	1 year, $600,000	
July 1, 2014	Brent Regner (D)	1 year, $550,000	
July 1, 2014	Jori Lehtera (C)	2 years, $5.5 million	
July 5, 2014	Pat Cannone (F)	1 year, $550,000	
July 8, 2014	Sebastian Wannstrom (F)	1 year, $600,000	
July 9, 2014	David Shields (D)	1 year, $600,000	
July 10, 2014	Steve Ott (C)	2 years, $2.6 million	
July 21, 2014	Ivan Barbashev (F)	3 year, $2.41 million entry-level contract	
September 2, 2014	Robby Fabbri (C)	3 year, entry-level contract	
September 27, 2014	Jaden Schwartz (C)	2 years, $4.7 million	
March 10, 2015	Colton Parayko (D)	2 year, entry-level contract	
May 28, 2015	Jordan Schmaltz (D)	3 year, entry-level contract	

== Draft picks ==
The 2014 NHL entry draft will be held on June 27–28, 2014 at the Wells Fargo Center in Philadelphia, Pennsylvania.

Round	#	Player	Pos	Nationality	College/Junior/Club team (League)
1	21	Robby Fabbri	Center	Canada	Guelph Storm (OHL)
2	33^{[a]}	Ivan Barbashev	Center / Left wing	Russia	Moncton Wildcats (QMJHL)
2	52	Maxim Letunov	Center	Russia	Youngstown Phantoms (USHL)
3	82	Jake Walman	Defense	Canada	Toronto Jr. Canadiens (OJHL)
4	94^{[b]}	Ville Husso	Goaltender	Finland	HIFK (Liiga)
4	110^{[c]}	Austin Poganski	Right wing	United States	Tri-City Storm (USHL)
5	124^{[d]}	Jaedon Descheneau	Right wing	Canada	Kootenay Ice (WHL)
6	172	Chandler Yakimowicz	Right wing	United States	London Knights (OHL)
6	176^{[e]}	Samuel Blais	Left wing	Canada	Victoriaville Tigres (QMJHL)
7	202	Dwyer Tschantz	Right wing	United States	Indiana Ice (USHL)

Draft notes

- ^{a} Edmonton's second-round pick will go to St. Louis, as the result of a trade on July 10, 2013 that sent David Perron to Edmonton, in exchange for Magnus Paajarvi, and this pick.
- ^{b} The Calgary Flames' fourth-round pick went to the St. Louis Blues as the result of a trade on June 28, 2014 that sent Roman Polak to Toronto in exchange for Carl Gunnarsson and this pick.
  Toronto previously acquired this pick as the result of a trade on September 29, 2013 that sent Joe Colborne to Calgary in exchange for this pick (being conditional at the time of the trade). The condition – If Calgary fails to qualify for the 2014 Stanley Cup playoffs then this pick will remain a fourth-round pick in 2014 – was converted on March 30, 2014.
- ^{c} Tampa Bay's fourth-round pick will go to St. Louis, as the result of a trade on July 10, 2012 that sent B. J. Crombeen and a fifth-round pick in 2014 to Tampa Bay, in exchange for a fourth-round pick in 2013, and this pick.
- St. Louis's fourth-round pick will go to the Nashville Predators, as the result of a trade on June 30, 2013 that sent a fourth-round pick in 2013 to St. Louis, in exchange for a seventh-round pick in 2013, and this pick.
- ^{d} Calgary's fifth-round pick will go to St. Louis, as the result of a trade on July 5, 2013 that sent Kris Russell to Calgary, in exchange for this pick.
- St. Louis's fifth-round pick will go to the Tampa Bay Lightning, as the result of a trade on July 10, 2012 that sent fourth-round picks in 2013 and 2014 to St. Louis, in exchange for B. J. Crombeen and this pick.
- ^{e} Boston's sixth-round pick will go to St. Louis, as the result of a trade on April 3, 2013 that sent Wade Redden to Boston, in exchange for this pick (being conditional at the time of the trade). The condition – St. Louis will receive a sixth-round pick in 2014 if Redden appears in one playoff game in the 2013 for the Bruins – was converted on May 1, 2013.
