= 2014–15 Tampa Bay Lightning season =

National Hockey League team season

2014–15 Tampa Bay Lightning
- Eastern Conference champions
- Division: 2nd Atlantic
- Conference: 3rd Eastern
- 2014–15 record: 50–24–8
- Home record: 32–8–1
- Road record: 18–16–7
- Goals for: 262
- Goals against: 211

Team information
- General manager: Steve Yzerman
- Coach: Jon Cooper
- Captain: Steven Stamkos
- Alternate captains: Brian Boyle; Ryan Callahan; Ondrej Palat
- Arena: Amalie Arena
- Average attendance: 18,823 (98.0%)

Team leaders
- Goals: Steven Stamkos (43)
- Assists: Ondrej Palat (47)
- Points: Tyler Johnson and Steven Stamkos (72)
- Penalty minutes: Brenden Morrow (64)
- Plus/minus: Nikita Kucherov (+38)
- Wins: Ben Bishop (40)
- Goals against average: Ben Bishop (2.32)

The 2014–15 Tampa Bay Lightning season was the 23rd season for the National Hockey League (NHL) franchise that was established on December 16, 1991.

== Off-season ==
=== April ===
The off-season for the Tampa Bay Lightning began on April 22, 2014, when they were eliminated in a four-game sweep by the Montreal Canadiens. On May 6, 2014, the first off-season transaction involved the Lightning signing their highly touted goaltender Andrei Vasilevskiy to a three-year, entry-level contract. Coming into the 2014–15 season, Vasilevskiy is rated as team's top goaltending prospect. On May 21, 2014, the Lightning signed 2012 draft pick defensemen Dylan Blujus to a three-year, entry-level contract. Blujus had four goals and 30 points in 55 games with the North Bay Battalion of the Ontario Hockey League (OHL). He also had four goals and 10 points in 22 playoff games, while helping the Battalion reach the OHL finals.

=== May ===
On May 23, 2014, the Lightning announced the re-signing of Calder Memorial Trophy finalist Tyler Johnson to a three-year contract extension. Johnson had 24 goals, 26 assists and a plus-23 rating in 82 games. Johnson led all rookies in total playing time, and was used heavily on the penalty kill. Additionally, Johnson put up five shorthanded goals, which tied for the NHL lead. Johnson was also named to the NHL All-Rookie Team for the 2013–14 season.

=== June ===
On June 9, 2014, the Lightning announced the re-signing of co-Calder Trophy finalist Ondrej Palat to a three-year, $10 million contract extension. Palat had 23 goals and a team-high 59 points during the 2013–14 season. Among all NHL rookies, he ranked second in points and third in goals. Like Johnson, Palat was also named to the NHL All-Rookie Team for the 2013–14 season.

On June 25, 2014, the Lightning signed Ryan Callahan to a six-year, $34.8 million contract. Callahan was acquired by the team in the previous season in the trade that sent Martin St. Louis to the New York Rangers, along with acquiring what would become a first round pick in both the 2014 and 2015 NHL entry drafts. Callahan had six goals and five assists in 20 regular season games with the Lightning. On the same day, the Lighting elected to use their final compliance buyout on forward Ryan Malone. Malone had dealt with injury problems during his stint with the Lightning, and saw his numbers dip to five goals and ten assists in 57 games. Additionally, Malone was involved in an arrest for DUI and cocaine possession. The team continued its busy day by re-signing forward J. T. Brown to a two-year, one-way contract. Brown appeared in 63 games with the Lightning last season, scoring four goals and 19 points while averaging 13:02 in ice time per game. Brown also appeared in all four Stanley Cup playoff games in 2014, notching two assists.

On June 27, 2014, the Lightning announced the re-signing of Mark Barberio to one-year, one-way contract. Barberio skated in 49 games, recording five goals and 10 points during the 2013–14 season. He was tied for fourth in the NHL among rookie defensemen with a plus-10 rating. Barberio has appeared in 51 total games for the Lightning, and has recorded a plus or even rating in 40 of his career games. On the same day, the Lighting acquired defensemen Jason Garrison from the Vancouver Canucks in exchange for their second round draft pick (50th overall). In addition to Garrison, the Lightning received the rights to left winger Jeff Costello and the Canuck's seventh round pick in 2015. In 2013–14, Garrison had 33 points in 81 games, but saw his possession numbers fall under former Vancouver Canucks head coach John Tortorella.

On June 29, 2014, the Lightning pulled off a series of trades to free up salary cap and acquire several draft picks. First, the Lightning traded Teddy Purcell to the Edmonton Oilers for center Sam Gagner. Purcell played five seasons for Tampa Bay after being acquired from the Los Angeles Kings in March 2010. Purcell's breakout year was in 2011–12, when he had 24 goals and 41 assists, along with a great playoff run the previous season that saw the Lightning reach the Eastern Conference Final. However, in recent years, Purcell has been somewhat disappointing for the team in terms of production; over the past two seasons, he has had 23 goals combined. The Lightning then quickly flipped Sam Gagner and forward B. J. Crombeen to the Arizona Coyotes for a sixth round draft pick in 2015. The Lightning also had to retain one-third of Gagner's remaining salary ($1.6 million). Crombeen, a fourth-line grinder and fighter, had four goals and 14 assists in 99 games over two seasons in Tampa Bay. At midnight, on June 1, 2014, the Lightning traded forward Nate Thompson to the Anaheim Ducks in exchange for a fourth and sixth round pick in the 2015 Draft. As a depth player, Thompson had become a key contributor the past five seasons, including being one of team's top penalty killers. On the same day, the Lightning re-signed Syracuse Crunch captain Mike Angelidis to a one-year, two-way contract. Angelidis skated in 75 games with the Crunch, recording 12 goals and 33 points to go along with 161 penalty minutes. He ranked second on the Crunch in penalty minutes and fifth in points. Angelidis has played in 515 career American Hockey League (AHL) games with the Norfolk Admirals, Albany River Rats and Crunch, collecting 99 goals and 207 points to go with 1,079 penalty minutes. In 2012, he was a member of the Norfolk Admirals team that won the Calder Cup championship, skating in 18 games and recording a goal and six points.

=== July ===
After freeing up cap space (approximately $13 million), the Lightning looked to the start of free agency. On July 1, the Lightning inked defensemen Anton Stralman to a $22.5 million, five-year contract. Stralman had one goal and 13 assists last season with the New York Rangers, and had five assists in 25 playoff games. A few hours later, the Lightning signed forward Brian Boyle to a three-year contract. Both Stralman and Boyle helped the Rangers capture the Eastern Conference Championship, and reach the Stanley Cup Final last season. Later in day, the Lightning signed goaltender Evgeni Nabokov to a one-year contract. Nabokov will serve as backup to starting goalie Ben Bishop, after team elected not to qualify an offer to goalie Anders Lindback, who signed with the Dallas Stars. In 2013–14 with the New York Islanders, Nabokov posted a .905 save percentage as their starting goaltender.

On July 4, the Lightning announced the re-signing of defensemen Andrej Sustr to a one-year, one-way contract. Sustr appeared in 43 games with the Lightning last season, posting one goal and eight points to go along with 16 penalty minutes. Sustr made his Stanley Cup playoffs debut against the Montreal Canadiens in 2014, skating in three games. In addition, he played in 12 games with the Syracuse Crunch, recording a goal and three assists. In total, Sustr has appeared in 45 NHL games, all with the Lightning over the past two seasons, recording one goal and eight points.

On July 8, the Lightning signed free agent defensemen Matt Corrente to a one-year, two-way contract. He has appeared in 34 career NHL games, all with the New Jersey Devils, over parts of two seasons, posting six assists and 68 penalty minutes. He also appeared in two playoff games during the 2010 Stanley Cup playoffs. This signing provides some depth and experience for the Crunch in the coming season, which will have several first-year players on defense. On the same day, the Lightning re-signed forward Cody Kunyk to a one-year, two-way contract. Kunyk signed by the Lightning last season as an undrafted free agent. He made his NHL debut, logging 10:12 of ice time, on April 13 against the Washington Capitals. Kunyk skated in over four seasons for the University of Alaska Fairbanks, where he had 60 goals and 133 points.

On July 10, the Lightning signed free agent forward Jerome Samson to a one-year, two-way contract. Samson played in 68 games for the St. John's IceCaps last season. He had 27 goals with 56 points. Samson has played in 424 AHL games with 160 goals and 336 points. Samson has also played in 46 career NHL games, all with the Carolina Hurricanes, over parts of three seasons. Samson will likely serve as veteran forward depth for Tampa's AHL affiliate, the Syracuse Crunch. On the same day, the Lightning re-signed forward Brett Connolly to a one-year, two-way contract. Connolly has played in 11 games for the Lightning last season, and had one goal. He has played in 84 career NHL games, all with the Lightning over three seasons. During that time, he has earned six goals and 17 points. Connolly has played in 137 AHL games, earning 52 goals and 120 points. He appeared in 66 games with the Crunch last season, totaling 21 goals and 57 points.

On July 11, 2014, the Lightning signed Brenden Morrow to a one-year contract. Morrow recorded 13 goals and 25 points in 71 games with the St. Louis Blues last season. Over his career, he has skated in 921 career NHL games with the Dallas Stars, Pittsburgh Penguins and the Blues. He has 262 goals and 567 points with a plus-108 rating. The Lightning also announced the signing of Philippe Paradis to a one-year, two-way contract. Paradis played in 56 games for the Crunch last season. He had six goals and 15 points. He has played 166 career AHL games with 13 goals and 43 points. Later in the day, the Lightning announced the re-signing of forward Richard Panik to a one-year, two-way contract. Panik played in 50 games with the Lightning last season and had three goals with 13 points. Additionally, he skated in 13 games with Syracuse and had three goals and 11 points.

=== August ===
On August 2, the Lightning re-signed starting goaltender Ben Bishop to a two-year contract extension. Bishop had a breakout season with the Lightning last year, posting a 37–14–7 record in 63 games. He had a .924 save percentage and a 2.23 goals against average (GAA). He set the Tampa Bay single season records for victories, save percentage and GAA, and was nominated for the Vezina Trophy as the NHL's top goaltender. Bishop has played in 108 career NHL games with the Lightning, Ottawa Senators and St. Louis Blues. He has a career record of 55–31–11 with eight shutouts, and a .920 save percentage and a 2.40 GAA.

== Training camp ==
On September 16, the Lightning announced their initial training camp roster, which contained 64 players. Goalie Leland Irving had signed a PTO to participate in the camp as a goalie invitee. However, Irving elected to sign with Salavat Yulaev Ufa of the Kontinental Hockey League (KHL) instead of participating in camp. The Lightning invited goalie Peter Mannino in Irving's place. The training camp roster also contained 24 players who participated in the rookie tournament in Tennessee. Some of the notable prospects from that tournament were Jonathan Drouin, Kristers Gudlevskis, Slater Koekkoek and Andrei Vasilevskiy. The training camp roster this year also contains the free agents acquired over the summer, as well as the returning cast from last years strong regular season performance.

On September 18, during practice, forward Jonathan Drouin fell during practice sustaining an "upper body injury." The team did not consider the injury to be serious, and he was expected to undergo further evaluation the following Monday. Despite the injury, Drouin was expected to make the opening night roster with the team.

On September 21, the Lightning released right winger Cameron Maclise from his training camp invite. Two days later, the Lightning released Michael Aviani and Kodie Curran from their training invites. In addition, the Lightning reassigned four 2014 draft picks to their respective junior hockey clubs (Digiacinto, Point, Masin and Thomas). Two days later, the Lightning announced that forward Jonathan Drouin is expected to miss three-to-four weeks with a thumb fracture. Drouin will continue to skate on his own until he is cleared to resume practicing with the team again.

On September 27, the Lightning held their Fan Fest event. During the event, the team unveiled their new third jersey for the upcoming season. This design retained the "Bolts" word mark logo, but brought back black as the primary color. Around the same time, the Lightning reduced their training camp roster by six players. The group of players consisted of AHL veteran players, which included Syracuse Crunch captain Mike Angelidis. All six players would have to clear waivers before being assigned to the Crunch. Later in the day, 27 players were reassigned to Syracuse or to their junior hockey club. As well, Peter Mannino was released from his training camp tryout. Some of the notable players in the group demoted were Kristers Gudlevskis, Andrei Vasilevskiy and Slater Koekkoek. A few notable prospects remained on the roster, including Vladislav Namestnikov, Cedric Paquette, Jonathan Drouin and defenseman Luke Witkowski.

== Standings ==
Atlantic Division
Pos	Team	GP	W	L	OTL	ROW	GF	GA	GD	Pts
1	y – Montreal Canadiens	82	50	22	10	43	221	189	+32	110
2	x – Tampa Bay Lightning	82	50	24	8	47	262	211	+51	108
3	x – Detroit Red Wings	82	43	25	14	39	235	221	+14	100
4	x – Ottawa Senators	82	43	26	13	37	238	215	+23	99
5	Boston Bruins	82	41	27	14	37	213	211	+2	96
6	Florida Panthers	82	38	29	15	30	206	223	−17	91
7	Toronto Maple Leafs	82	30	44	8	25	211	262	−51	68
8	Buffalo Sabres	82	23	51	8	15	161	274	−113	54

Source: National Hockey League
x – Clinched playoff spot; y – Clinched division

== Schedule and results ==
=== Preseason ===
2014 Preseason game log: 5–1–0 (home: 3–0–0; road: 2–1–0)

Game	Date	Opponent	Score	OT	Decision	Location	Attendance	Record	Recap
1	September 23	Nashville Predators	4–2		Vasilevskiy	Amalie Arena	10,442	1–0–0	
2	September 25	@ Nashville Predators	0–1		Gudlevskis	Bridgestone Arena	13,107	1–1–0	
3	September 26	Dallas Stars	6–3		Bishop	Amalie Arena	13,635	2–1–0	
4	September 30	@ Dallas Stars	5–1		Bishop	American Airlines Center	14,212	3–1–0	
5	October 2	@ Florida Panthers	3–0		Nabokov	BB&T Center	2,859	4–1–0	
6	October 4	Florida Panthers	4–1		Bishop	Amalie Arena	15,411	5–1–0	

2014 Preseason Schedule
Lightning score listed first;

Win Loss Overtime/shootout loss

=== Regular season ===
2014–15 Game Log
October: 7–3–1, 15 Points (home: 4–1–1; road: 3–2–0)

Game	Date	Opponent	Score	OT	Decision	Location	Attendance	Record	Points	Recap
1	October 9	Florida Panthers	3–2	OT	Bishop	Amalie Arena	19,204	1–0–0	2	
2	October 11	Ottawa Senators	2–3	SO	Bishop	Amalie Arena	19,204	1–0–1	3	
3	October 13	Montreal Canadiens	7–1		Bishop	Amalie Arena	17,622	2–0–1	5	
4	October 14	New Jersey Devils	1–2		Nabokov	Amalie Arena	18,064	2–1–1	5	
5	October 18	@ Vancouver Canucks	4–2		Bishop	Rogers Arena	18,647	3–1–1	7	
6	October 20	@ Edmonton Oilers	2–3		Bishop	Rexall Place	16,839	3–2–1	7	
7	October 21	@ Calgary Flames	2–1	OT	Nabokov	Scotiabank Saddledome	19,289	4–2–1	9	
8	October 24	@ Winnipeg Jets	4–2		Bishop	MTS Centre	15,016	5–2–1	11	
9	October 25	@ Minnesota Wild	2–7		Nabokov	Xcel Energy Center	18,884	5–3–1	11	
10	October 28	Arizona Coyotes	7–3		Bishop	Amalie Arena	17,511	6–3–1	13	
11	October 30	Philadelphia Flyers	4–3		Bishop	Amalie Arena	18,642	7–3–1	15	

November: 9–3–1, 19 Points (home: 6–1–0; road: 3–2–1)

Game	Date	Opponent	Score	OT	Decision	Location	Attendance	Record	Points	Recap
12	November 1	Washington Capitals	4–3		Bishop	Amalie Arena	19,119	8–3–1	17	
13	November 6	Calgary Flames	5–2		Bishop	Amalie Arena	18,276	9–3–1	19	
14	November 8	@ Columbus Blue Jackets	7–4		Nabokov	Nationwide Arena	14,982	10–3–1	21	
15	November 9	@ Detroit Red Wings	4–3	SO	Bishop	Joe Louis Arena	20,027	11–3–1	23	
16	November 11	@ Chicago Blackhawks	2–3	SO	Bishop	United Center	21,345	11–3–2	24	
17	November 13	San Jose Sharks	1–2		Bishop	Amalie Arena	19,004	11–4–2	24	
18	November 15	New York Islanders	5–2		Bishop	Amalie Arena	19,204	12–4–2	26	
19	November 17	@ New York Rangers	5–1		Bishop	Madison Square Garden	18,006	13–4–2	28	
20	November 18	@ New York Islanders	2–5		Nabokov	Nassau Coliseum	12,908	13–5–2	28	
21	November 20	@ Toronto Maple Leafs	2–5		Bishop	Air Canada Centre	19,089	13–6–2	28	
22	November 22	Minnesota Wild	2–1		Bishop	Amalie Arena	19,204	14–6–2	30	
23	November 26	New York Rangers	4–3		Bishop	Amalie Arena	19,204	15–6–2	32	
24	November 29	Ottawa Senators	4–1		Bishop	Amalie Arena	19,204	16–6–2	34	

December: 8–5–2, 18 Points (home: 5–2–0; road: 3–3–2)

Game	Date	Opponent	Score	OT	Decision	Location	Attendance	Record	Points	Recap
25	December 1	@ New York Rangers	6–3		Bishop	Madison Square Garden	18,006	17–6–2	36	
26	December 2	@ Buffalo Sabres	1–2	SO	Nabokov	First Niagara Center	17,772	17–6–3	37	
27	December 4	Buffalo Sabres	5–0		Bishop	Amalie Arena	17,767	18–6–3	39	
28	December 6	Columbus Blue Jackets	1–3		Bishop	Amalie Arena	17,467	18–7–3	39	
29	December 9	Washington Capitals	3–5		Bishop	Amalie Arena	17,109	18–8–3	39	
30	December 11	Carolina Hurricanes	2–1		Nabokov	Amalie Arena	18,104	19–8–3	41	
31	December 13	@ Washington Capitals	2–4		Bishop	Verizon Center	18,506	19–9–3	41	
32	December 15	@ Pittsburgh Penguins	2–4		Nabokov	Consol Energy Center	18,487	19–10–3	41	
33	December 16	@ Philadelphia Flyers	3–1		Vasilevskiy	Wells Fargo Center	19,576	20–10–3	43	
34	December 19	@ New Jersey Devils	2–3	SO	Nabokov	Prudential Center	14,916	20–10–4	44	
35	December 20	@ New York Islanders	1–3		Vasilevskiy	Nassau Coliseum	16,170	20–11–4	44	
36	December 23	Pittsburgh Penguins	4–3		Vasilevskiy	Amalie Arena	19,204	21–11–4	46	
37	December 27	Carolina Hurricanes	2–1		Bishop	Amalie Arena	19,204	22–11–4	48	
38	December 29	Toronto Maple Leafs	3–2		Bishop	Amalie Arena	19,204	23–11–4	50	
39	December 31	@ Buffalo Sabres	5–1		Vasilevskiy	First Niagara Center	19,070	24–11–4	52	

January: 8–4–0, 16 Points (home: 6–0–0; road: 2–4–0)

Game	Date	Opponent	Score	OT	Decision	Location	Attendance	Record	Points	Recap
40	January 2	@ Pittsburgh Penguins	3–6		Bishop	Consol Energy Center	18,655	24–12–4	52	
41	January 4	@ Ottawa Senators	4–2		Bishop	Canadian Tire Centre	16,949	25–12–4	54	
42	January 6	@ Montreal Canadiens	4–2		Bishop	Bell Centre	21,286	26–12–4	56	
43	January 9	Buffalo Sabres	2–1		Bishop	Amalie Arena	19,204	27–12–4	58	
44	January 12	@ Philadelphia Flyers	3–7		Nabokov	Wells Fargo Center	19,598	27–13–4	58	
45	January 13	@ Boston Bruins	3–4		Bishop	TD Garden	17,565	27–14–4	58	
46	January 15	Edmonton Oilers	3–2		Bishop	Amalie Arena	18,609	28–14–4	60	
47	January 17	Colorado Avalanche	3–2	SO	Bishop	Amalie Arena	19,204	29–14–4	62	
48	January 20	Vancouver Canucks	4–1		Bishop	Amalie Arena	18,517	30–14–4	64	
All-Star Break (January 22–26)
49	January 27	@ Carolina Hurricanes	2–4		Bishop	PNC Arena	12,508	30–15–4	64	
50	January 29	Detroit Red Wings	5–1		Bishop	Amalie Arena	19,204	31–15–4	66	
51	January 31	Columbus Blue Jackets	3–1		Bishop	Amalie Arena	18,477	32–15–4	68	

February: 6–4–2, 14 Points (home: 2–2–0; road: 4–2–2)

Game	Date	Opponent	Score	OT	Decision	Location	Attendance	Record	Points	Recap
52	February 3	@ St. Louis Blues	1–2	OT	Bishop	Scottrade Center	17,223	32–15–5	69	
53	February 5	@ Dallas Stars	5–3		Vasilevskiy	American Airlines Center	16,010	33–15–5	71	
54	February 7	Los Angeles Kings	2–4		Bishop	Amalie Arena	19,204	33–16–5	71	
55	February 8	Anaheim Ducks	5–3		Bishop	Amalie Arena	19,204	34–16–5	73	
56	February 10	@ Nashville Predators	2–3	OT	Vasilevskiy	Bridgestone Arena	16,362	34–16–6	74	
57	February 12	St. Louis Blues	3–6		Bishop	Amalie Arena	18,926	34–17–6	74	
58	February 15	@ San Jose Sharks	5–2		Bishop	SAP Center at San Jose	17,562	35–17–6	76	
59	February 16	@ Los Angeles Kings	2–3		Vasilevskiy	Staples Center	18,230	35–17–6	76	
60	February 18	@ Anaheim Ducks	4–1		Bishop	Honda Center	17,284	36–17–6	78	
61	February 21	@ Arizona Coyotes	4–2		Bishop	Gila River Arena	12,997	37–17–6	80	
62	February 22	@ Colorado Avalanche	4–5		Vasilevskiy	Pepsi Center	17,385	37–18–6	80	
63	February 27	Chicago Blackhawks	4–0		Bishop	Amalie Arena	19,204	38–18–6	82	

March: 9–5–1, 19 Points (home: 7–2–0; road: 2–3–1)

Game	Date	Opponent	Score	OT	Decision	Location	Attendance	Record	Points	Recap
64	March 1	@ Florida Panthers	3–4		Bishop	BB&T Center	10,336	38–20–6	82	
65	March 3	Buffalo Sabres	3–0		Vasilevskiy	Amalie Arena	18,922	39–20–6	84	
66	March 5	Toronto Maple Leafs	4–2		Bishop	Amalie Arena	19,204	40–20–6	86	
67	March 7	Dallas Stars	5–4		Vasilevskiy	Amalie Arena	19,204	41–20–6	88	
68	March 10	@ Montreal Canadiens	1–0	OT	Bishop	Bell Centre	21,286	42–20–6	90	
69	March 12	@ Boston Bruins	2–3	SO	Bishop	TD Garden	17,565	42–20–7	91	
70	March 14	Winnipeg Jets	1–2		Vasilevskiy	Amalie Arena	19,204	42–21–7	91	
71	March 16	Montreal Canadiens	4–2		Bishop	Amalie Arena	19,204	43–21–7	93	
72	March 20	Detroit Red Wings	3–1		Bishop	Amalie Arena	19,204	44–21–7	95	
73	March 22	Boston Bruins	5–3		Bishop	Amalie Arena	19,204	45–21–7	97	
74	March 24	Florida Panthers	4–3		Vasilevskiy	Amalie Arena	18,729	46–21–7	99	
75	March 26	Nashville Predators	2–3		Bishop	Amalie Arena	19,204	46–22–7	99	
76	March 28	@ Detroit Red Wings	0–4		Bishop	Joe Louis Arena	20,027	46–23–7	99	
77	March 30	@ Montreal Canadiens	5–3		Bishop	Bell Centre	21,286	47–23–7	101	
78	March 31	@ Toronto Maple Leafs	1–3		Vasilevskiy	Air Canada Centre	18,857	47–24–7	101	

April: 3–0–1, 7 Points (home: 2–0–0; road: 1–0–1)

Game	Date	Opponent	Score	OT	Decision	Location	Attendance	Record	Points	Recap
79	April 2	@ Ottawa Senators	1–2	OT	Bishop	Canadian Tire Centre	18,097	47–24–8	102	
80	April 4	@ Florida Panthers	4–0		Bishop	BB&T Center	11,072	48–24–8	104	
81	April 9	New Jersey Devils	4–3	OT	Bishop	Amalie Arena	19,204	49–24–8	106	
82	April 11	Boston Bruins	3–2	SO	Bishop	Amalie Arena	19,204	50–24–8	108	

2014–15 Schedule
Lightning score listed first;

Win (2 Points) Loss (0 points) Overtime/shootout loss (1 point)

=== Playoffs ===
2015 Stanley Cup playoffs
Eastern Conference First Round vs. Detroit Red Wings (A3) – Tampa Bay won series 4–3

Game	Date	Opponent	Score	OT	Decision	Location	Attendance	Series	Recap
1	April 16	Detroit Red Wings	2–3		Bishop	Amalie Arena	19,204	0–1	
2	April 18	Detroit Red Wings	5–1		Bishop	Amalie Arena	19,204	1–1	
3	April 21	@ Detroit Red Wings	0–3		Bishop	Joe Louis Arena	20,027	1–2	
4	April 23	@ Detroit Red Wings	3–2	2:25 OT	Bishop	Joe Louis Arena	20,027	2–2	
5	April 25	Detroit Red Wings	0–4		Bishop	Amalie Arena	19,204	2–3	
6	April 27	@ Detroit Red Wings	5–2		Bishop	Joe Louis Arena	20,027	3–3	
7	April 29	Detroit Red Wings	2–0		Bishop	Amalie Arena	19,204	4–3	

Eastern Conference Second Round vs. Montreal Canadiens (A1) – Tampa Bay won series 4–2

Game	Date	Opponent	Score	OT	Decision	Location	Attendance	Series	Recap
1	May 1	@ Montreal Canadiens	2–1	2:06 2OT	Bishop	Bell Center	21,287	1–0	
2	May 3	@ Montreal Canadiens	6–2		Bishop	Bell Center	21,287	2–0	
3	May 6	Montreal Canadiens	2–1		Bishop	Amalie Arena	19,204	3–0	
4	May 7	Montreal Canadiens	2–6		Bishop	Amalie Arena	19,204	3–1	
5	May 9	@ Montreal Canadiens	1–2		Bishop	Bell Center	21,287	3–2	
6	May 12	Montreal Canadiens	4–1		Bishop	Amalie Arena	19,204	4–2	

Eastern Conference Finals vs. New York Rangers (M1) – Tampa Bay won series 4–3

Game	Date	Opponent	Score	OT	Decision	Location	Attendance	Series	Recap
1	May 16	@ New York Rangers	1–2		Bishop	Madison Square Garden	18,006	0–1	
2	May 18	@ New York Rangers	6–2		Bishop	Madison Square Garden	18,006	1–1	
3	May 20	New York Rangers	6–5	3:33 OT	Bishop	Amalie Arena	19,204	2–1	
4	May 22	New York Rangers	1–5		Bishop	Amalie Arena	19,204	2–2	
5	May 24	@ New York Rangers	2–0		Bishop	Madison Square Garden	18,006	3–2	
6	May 26	New York Rangers	3–7		Bishop	Amalie Arena	19,204	3–3	
7	May 29	@ New York Rangers	2–0		Bishop	Madison Square Garden	18,006	4–3	

Stanley Cup Finals vs. Chicago Blackhawks (C3) – Chicago won series 4–2

Game	Date	Opponent	Score	OT	Decision	Location	Attendance	Series	Recap
1	June 3	Chicago Blackhawks	1–2		Bishop	Amalie Arena	19,204	0–1	
2	June 6	Chicago Blackhawks	4–3		Vasilevskiy	Amalie Arena	19,204	1–1	
3	June 8	@ Chicago Blackhawks	3–2		Bishop	United Center	22,336	2–1	
4	June 10	@ Chicago Blackhawks	1–2		Vasilevskiy	United Center	22,336	2–2	
5	June 13	Chicago Blackhawks	1–2		Bishop	Amalie Arena	19,204	2–3	
6	June 15	@ Chicago Blackhawks	0–2		Bishop	United Center	22,424	2–4	

Lightning score listed first;

Win Loss

== Player stats ==
Final stats

Skaters

Regular season
Player	GP	G	A	Pts	+/−	PIM
Steven Stamkos	82	43	29	72	2	49
Tyler Johnson	77	29	43	72	33	24
Nikita Kucherov	82	29	36	65	38	37
Ondrej Palat	75	16	47	63	31	24
Ryan Callahan	77	24	30	54	9	41
Valtteri Filppula	82	12	36	48	−14	24
Anton Stralman	82	9	30	39	22	26
Alexander Killorn	71	15	23	38	8	36
Victor Hedman	59	10	28	38	12	40
Jonathan Drouin	70	4	28	32	3	34
Jason Garrison	70	4	26	30	27	19
Brian Boyle	82	15	9	24	3	54
Cedric Paquette	64	12	7	19	4	51
Matt Carle	59	4	14	18	12	26
Vladislav Namestnikov	43	9	7	16	1	13
Brett Connolly^{‡}	50	12	3	15	4	38
Andrej Sustr	72	0	13	13	10	34
J. T. Brown	52	3	6	9	−2	30
Brenden Morrow	70	3	5	8	−1	64
Nikita Nesterov	27	2	5	7	6	16
Mark Barberio	52	1	6	7	−4	16
Radko Gudas^{‡}	31	2	3	5	−5	34
Eric Brewer^{‡}	17	0	4	4	5	18
Braydon Coburn^{†}	4	0	2	2	3	9
Jonathan Marchessault	2	1	0	1	1	0
Mike Blunden	2	0	0	0	−1	2
Mike Angelidis	3	0	0	0	0	12
Luke Witkowski	16	0	0	0	0	15
Slater Koekkoek	3	0	0	0	0	2

Playoffs
Player	GP	G	A	Pts	+/−	PIM
Tyler Johnson	26	13	10	23	7	24
Nikita Kucherov	26	10	12	22	7	14
Steven Stamkos	26	7	11	18	2	20
Alexander Killorn	26	9	9	18	3	12
Ondrej Palat	26	8	8	16	5	12
Valtteri Filppula	26	4	10	14	−6	4
Victor Hedman	26	1	13	14	11	6
Anton Stralman	26	1	8	9	1	8
Ryan Callahan	25	2	6	8	3	14
Jason Garrison	23	2	5	7	−2	8
Nikita Nesterov	17	1	5	6	5	8
Braydon Coburn	26	1	3	4	−6	21
Cedric Paquette	24	3	0	3	−6	28
Matt Carle	25	0	3	3	−10	4
Brian Boyle	25	1	1	2	−3	10
J. T. Brown	24	1	1	2	−5	0
Andrej Sustr	26	1	1	2	4	18
Vladislav Namestnikov	12	0	1	1	−2	4
Brenden Morrow	24	0	0	0	−2	22
Jonathan Marchessault	2	0	0	0	0	0
Jonathan Drouin	6	0	0	0	−6	2
Mark Barberio	1	0	0	0	−1	0

Goaltenders

Regular season
Player	GP	GS	TOI	W	L	OT	GA	GAA	SA	SV%	SO	G	A	PIM
Ben Bishop	62	60	3519	40	13	5	136	2.32	1620	.916	4	0	4	4
Andrei Vasilevskiy	16	13	864	7	5	1	34	2.36	415	.918	1	0	0	0
Evgeni Nabokov^{‡}	11	9	553	3	6	2	29	3.15	232	.882	0	0	1	2

Playoffs
Player	GP	GS	TOI	W	L	GA	GAA	SA	SV%	SO	G	A	PIM
Ben Bishop	25	25	1459	13	11	53	2.18	669	.921	3	0	3	4
Andrei Vasilevskiy	4	1	113	1	1	6	3.19	57	.895	0	0	0	0

^{†}Denotes player spent time with another team before joining Tampa Bay. Stats reflect time with Tampa Bay only.
^{‡}Traded from Tampa Bay mid-season.
Bold/italics denotes franchise record

== Awards and honors ==
=== Awards ===
Regular season
Player	Award	Awarded
Steven Stamkos	NHL Third Star of the Week	October 20, 2014
Ryan Callahan	NHL Second Star of the Week	December 1, 2014
Steven Stamkos	NHL All-Star game selection	January 10, 2015
Tyler Johnson	NHL All-Star game selection	January 10, 2015
Jonathan Drouin	NHL All-Star game rookie selection	January 10, 2015
Tyler Johnson	NHLPA Player of the Week	January 12, 2015
Cedric Paquette	NHL Second Star of the Week	February 2, 2015
Ben Bishop	NHL Third Star of the Week	March 23, 2015
Steve Yzerman	NHL General Manager of the Year Award	June 24, 2015

=== Milestones ===
Regular season
Player	Milestone	Reached
Vladislav Namestnikov	1st career NHL assist 1st career NHL point 1st career NHL goal	October 13, 2014
Tyler Johnson	100th career NHL game	October 14, 2014
Ondrej Palat	100th career NHL game	October 18, 2014
Jonathan Drouin	1st career NHL game	October 20, 2014
Anton Stralman	400th career NHL game	October 20, 2014
Jonathan Drouin	1st career NHL assist 1st career NHL point	October 21, 2014
Jonathan Drouin	1st career NHL goal	October 24, 2014
Brian Boyle	400th career NHL game	October 25, 2014
Radko Gudas	100th career NHL game	October 25, 2014
Anton Stralman	100th career NHL assist	October 25, 2014
Nikita Kucherov	1st career NHL hat trick	October 28, 2014
Cedric Paquette	1st career NHL goal	November 6, 2014
Steven Stamkos	200th career NHL assist	November 11, 2014
Valtteri Filppula	200th career NHL assist	December 1, 2014
Brett Connolly	100th career NHL game	December 6, 2014
Steven Stamkos	250th career NHL goal	December 9, 2014
Andrei Vasilevskiy	1st career NHL game 1st career NHL win	December 16, 2014
Ryan Callahan	500th career NHL game	December 20, 2014
Nikita Nesterov	1st career NHL game	December 31, 2014
Valtteri Filppula	600th career NHL game	January 6, 2015
Nikita Nesterov	1st career NHL assist 1st career NHL point	January 13, 2015
Luke Witkowski	1st career NHL game	January 20, 2015
Nikita Kucherov	100th career NHL game	January 20, 2015
Cedric Paquette	1st career NHL hat trick	January 29, 2015
J. T. Brown	100th career NHL game	February 5, 2015
Ondrej Palat	100th career NHL point	February 5, 2015
Andrej Sustr	100th career NHL game	February 16, 2015
Nikita Nesterov	1st career NHL goal	February 16, 2015
Andrei Vasilevskiy	1st career NHL Shutout	March 3, 2015
Slater Koekkoek	1st career NHL Game	March 31, 2015
Mark Barberio	100th career NHL Game	April 2, 2015
Jonathan Marchessault	1st career NHL Goal; 1st career NHL Point	April 11, 2015

Playoffs
Player	Milestone	Reached
Vladislav Namestnikov	1st Career Playoff Game	April 16, 2015
Nikita Nesterov	1st Career Playoff Game; 1st Career Playoff Goal; 1st Career Playoff Point	April 16, 2015
Ben Bishop	1st Career Playoff Game	April 16, 2015
Nikita Nesterov	1st Career Playoff Assist	April 18, 2015
Nikita Kucherov	1st Career Playoff Assist	April 18, 2015
Andrej Sustr	1st Career Playoff Goal; 1st Career Playoff Point	April 18, 2015
Vladislav Namestnikov	1st Career Playoff Assist; 1st Career Playoff Point	April 18, 2015
Ben Bishop	1st Career Playoff Win	April 18, 2015
Jonathan Drouin	1st Career Playoff Game	April 23, 2015
Cedric Paquette	1st Career Playoff Goal	April 27, 2015
Ben Bishop	1st Career Playoff Shutout	April 29, 2015
Andrej Sustr	1st Career Playoff Assist	May 1, 2015
J. T. Brown	1st Career Playoff Goal	May 3, 2015
Jonathan Marchessault	1st career NHL Game	May 12, 2015
Tyler Johnson	1st Career Playoff hat trick^{[See note]}	May 18, 2015
Andrei Vasilevskiy	1st Career Playoff Win	June 6, 2015

- ^{Note} First in Franchise History

== Transactions ==
The Lightning have been involved in the following transactions during the 2014–15 season.

=== Trades ===
June 27, 2014	To Vancouver Canucks 2nd-round pick in 2014	To Tampa Bay Lightning Jason Garrison; Jeff Costello (rights); 7th-round pick in 2015
June 27, 2014	To New York Islanders NYR's 1st-round pick in 2014	To Tampa Bay Lightning 2nd-round pick in 2014; MTL's 2nd-round pick in 2014
June 28, 2014	To Minnesota Wild 3rd-round pick in 2014; 7th-round pick in 2015	To Tampa Bay Lightning 3rd-round pick in 2014
June 28, 2014	To New York Rangers 5th-round pick in 2014; STL's 5th-round pick in 2014	To Tampa Bay Lightning 4th-round pick in 2014
June 28, 2014	To New York Islanders 7th-round pick in 2014; 7th-round pick in 2015	To Tampa Bay Lightning 7th-round pick in 2014
June 29, 2014	To Edmonton Oilers Teddy Purcell	To Tampa Bay Lightning Sam Gagner
June 29, 2014	To Arizona Coyotes Sam Gagner; B. J. Crombeen	To Tampa Bay Lightning 6th-round pick in 2015
June 30, 2014	To Anaheim Ducks Nate Thompson	To Tampa Bay Lightning 4th-round pick in 2015; 7th-round pick in 2015
November 28, 2014	To Anaheim Ducks Eric Brewer	To Tampa Bay Lightning EDM's 3rd-round pick in 2015
February 6, 2015	To Toronto Maple Leafs conditional 7th-round pick in 2016	To Tampa Bay Lightning David Broll; Carter Ashton
February 9, 2015	To San Jose Sharks Evgeni Nabokov	To Tampa Bay Lightning Future Considerations
March 2, 2015	To Philadelphia Flyers Radko Gudas; Conditional 1st-round pick in 2015; 3rd-round pick in 2015	To Tampa Bay Lightning Braydon Coburn
March 2, 2015	To Boston Bruins Brett Connolly	To Tampa Bay Lightning 2nd-round pick in 2015; 2nd-round pick in 2016
June 1, 2015	To New York Rangers NYR's 7th-round pick in 2015	To Tampa Bay Lightning Daniel Walcott

=== Free agents acquired ===
Date	Player	Former team	Contract terms (in U.S. dollars)	Ref
July 1, 2014	Anton Stralman	New York Rangers	5 years, $22.5 million	
July 1, 2014	Mike Blunden	Montreal Canadiens	1 year, $600,000	
July 1, 2014	Brian Boyle	New York Rangers	3 years, $6 million	
July 1, 2014	Evgeni Nabokov	New York Islanders	1 year, $1.55 million	
July 8, 2014	Matt Corrente	Carolina Hurricanes	1 year, $550,000	
July 10, 2014	Jerome Samson	Winnipeg Jets	1 year, $650,000	
July 11, 2014	Brenden Morrow	St. Louis Blues	1 year, $1.55 million	
February 23, 2015	Allen York	Syracuse Crunch	Remainder of 2014-15 season	

=== Free agents lost ===
Date	Player	New team	Contract terms (in U.S. dollars)	Ref
July 1, 2014	Keith Aulie	Edmonton Oilers	1 year, $800,000	
July 1, 2014	Anders Lindback	Dallas Stars	1 year, $925,000	
July 1, 2014	Pierre-Cedric Labrie	Chicago Blackhawks	1 year, $550,000	
July 1, 2014	Mike Kostka	New York Rangers	1 year, $650,000	
July 1, 2014	Cedrick Desjardins	New York Rangers	2 years, $1.2 million	
August 4, 2014	Tom Pyatt	Genève-Servette HC	undisclosed	
September 11, 2014	Ryan Malone	New York Rangers	1 year, $700,000	

=== Claimed via waivers ===
Player	Previous team	Date

=== Lost via waivers ===
Player	New team	Date
Richard Panik	Toronto Maple Leafs	October 9, 2014

=== Lost via retirement ===
Player

=== Players released ===
Date	Player	Via	Ref
June 25, 2014	Ryan Malone	Compliance buyout	

=== Player signings ===
Date	Player	Contract terms (in U.S. dollars)	Ref
June 27, 2014	Mark Barberio	1 year, $874,125	
July 1, 2014	Mike Angelidis	1 year, $650,000	
July 4, 2014	Andrej Sustr	1 year, $874,125	
July 8, 2014	Cody Kunyk	1 year, $874,125	
July 10, 2014	Brett Connolly	1 year, $850,500	
July 11, 2014	Philippe Paradis	1 year, $850,500	
July 11, 2014	Richard Panik	1 year, $735,000	
August 2, 2014	Ben Bishop	2 years, $11.9 million contract extension	
December 2, 2014	Tony DeAngelo	3 years, $2.7 million entry-level contract	
March 26, 2015	Brayden Point	3 years, entry-level contract	
April 1, 2015	Matthew Peca	2 years, entry-level contract	
April 1, 2015	Adam Wilcox	2 years, entry-level contract	
April 9, 2015	Cameron Darcy	3 years, entry-level contract	

== Draft picks ==
Below are the Tampa Bay Lightning' selections made at the 2014 NHL entry draft, held on June 27–28, 2014 at the Wells Fargo Center in Philadelphia.

Round	#	Player	Pos	Nationality	College/Junior/Club team (League)
1	19	Tony DeAngelo	D	United States	Sarnia Sting (OHL)
2	35^{[a]}	Dominik Masin	D	Czech Republic	Slavia Praha (ELH)
2	57^{[b]}	Johnathan MacLeod	D	United States	USA U-18 (USHL)
3	79^{[c]}	Brayden Point	C	Canada	Moose Jaw Warriors (WHL)
4	119^{[d]}	Ben Thomas	D	Canada	Calgary Hitmen (WHL)
6	170	Cristiano DiGiacinto	LW	Canada	Windsor Spitfires (OHL)
6	185^{[e]}	Cameron Darcy	C	United States	Cape Breton Screaming Eagles (QMJHL)

Draft notes

- ^{[a]}The New York Islanders' second-round pick went to the Tampa Bay Lightning as the result of a trade on June 27, 2014, that sent the Rangers first-round pick in 2014 (28th overall) to New York in exchange for Montreal's second-round pick in 2014 (57th overall) and this pick.
- The Tampa Bay Lightning's second-round pick went to the Los Angeles Kings as the result of a trade on June 28, 2014, that sent Linden Vey to Vancouver in exchange for this pick.
- ^{[b]}The Montreal Canadiens' second-round pick went to the Tampa Bay Lightning as the result of a trade on June 27, 2014, that sent the Rangers first-round pick in 2014 (28th overall) to the New York Islanders in exchange for the Islanders second-round pick in 2014 (35th overall) and this pick.
  The Islanders previously acquired this pick as the result of a trade on March 5, 2014 that sent Thomas Vanek and a conditional fifth-round pick in 2014 to Montreal in exchange for Sebastian Collberg and this pick (being conditional at the time of the trade). The condition – New York will receive a second-round pick in 2014 if Montreal qualifies for the 2014 Stanley Cup playoffs – was converted on April 1, 2014.
- ^{[c]}The Minnesota Wild's third-round pick went to the Tampa Bay Lightning as the result of a trade on June 28, 2014, that sent a third-round pick in 2014 (80th overall) and a seventh-round pick in 2015 to Minnesota in exchange for this pick.
- The Tampa Bay Lightning's third-round pick went to the Minnesota Wild as the result of a trade on June 28, 2014, that sent a third-round pick in 2014 (79th overall) to Tampa Bay in exchange for a seventh-round pick in 2015 and this pick.
- Tampa Bay's fourth-round pick went to St. Louis, as the result of a trade on July 10, 2012, that sent B. J. Crombeen, and a fifth-round pick in 2014 to Tampa Bay in exchange for a fourth-round pick in 2013, and this pick.
- ^{[d]}The New York Rangers' fourth-round pick went to the Tampa Bay Lightning as the result of a trade on June 28, 2014, that sent a fifth-round pick in 2014 (140th overall) and St. Louis' fifth-round pick in 2014 (142nd overall) to New York in exchange for this pick.
- The Tampa Bay Lightning's fifth-round pick went to the New York Rangers as the result of a trade on June 28, 2014, that sent a fourth-round pick in 2014 (119th overall) to Tampa Bay in exchange for St. Louis' fifth-round pick in 2014 (142nd overall) and this pick.
- ^{[e]}The New York Islanders' seventh-round pick went to the Tampa Bay Lightning as the result of a trade on June 28, 2014, that sent a seventh-round pick in 2014 (200th overall) and a seventh-round pick in 2015 to New York in exchange for this pick.
- The Tampa Bay Lightning's seventh-round pick went to the New York Islanders as the result of a trade on June 28, 2014, that sent a seventh-round pick in 2014 (185th overall) to Tampa Bay in exchange for a seventh-round pick in 2015 and this pick.
