= 2014–15 New York Rangers season =

National Hockey League season

2014–15 New York Rangers
- Presidents' Trophy winners
- Metropolitan Division champions
- Division: 1st Metropolitan
- Conference: 1st Eastern
- 2014–15 record: 53–22–7
- Home record: 25–11–5
- Road record: 28–11–2
- Goals for: 252
- Goals against: 192

Team information
- General manager: Glen Sather
- Coach: Alain Vigneault
- Captain: Ryan McDonagh
- Alternate captains: Dan Girardi; Marc Staal; Derek Stepan; Martin St. Louis
- Arena: Madison Square Garden
- Average attendance: 18,006 (37 games)
- Minor league affiliates: Hartford Wolf Pack (AHL); Greenville Road Warriors (ECHL)

Team leaders
- Goals: Rick Nash (42)
- Assists: Derick Brassard (41)
- Points: Rick Nash (69)
- Penalty minutes: Tanner Glass (98)
- Plus/minus: Rick Nash (+29)
- Wins: Henrik Lundqvist (30)
- Goals against average: Mackenzie Skapski (0.50)

The 2014–15 New York Rangers season was the franchise's 88th season of play and their 89th season overall.

The Rangers clinched their third Presidents' Trophy and eighth division title by finishing with the best record in the NHL at 53–22–7. The 53 wins and 113 points both set franchise records (which were both surpassed by the 2023–24 team). The 113 points marked the eighth time in franchise history that the team had reached the 100-point plateau. The division title was the Rangers' first in the Metropolitan Division, which was created during the NHL's realignment in the 2013 offseason. The team won 28 road games in the regular season, breaking the franchise record set the previous season.

The Rangers faced the Pittsburgh Penguins in the first round, winning the series in five games following an overtime winner from Carl Hagelin. In the second round, the Rangers took on the Washington Capitals, winning the series in seven games after initially trailing three games to one. The season marked the third time in four years that the Rangers reached the Eastern Conference Finals. They faced the Tampa Bay Lightning, but lost the series in seven games, falling one win short from a second consecutive appearance in the Stanley Cup Finals. They were the most recent Presidents' Trophy winners to advance past the second round of the playoffs until the 2023–24 team.

== Off-season ==
The Rangers used their second compliance buyout on center Brad Richards on June 20, 2014.

=== Training camp ===
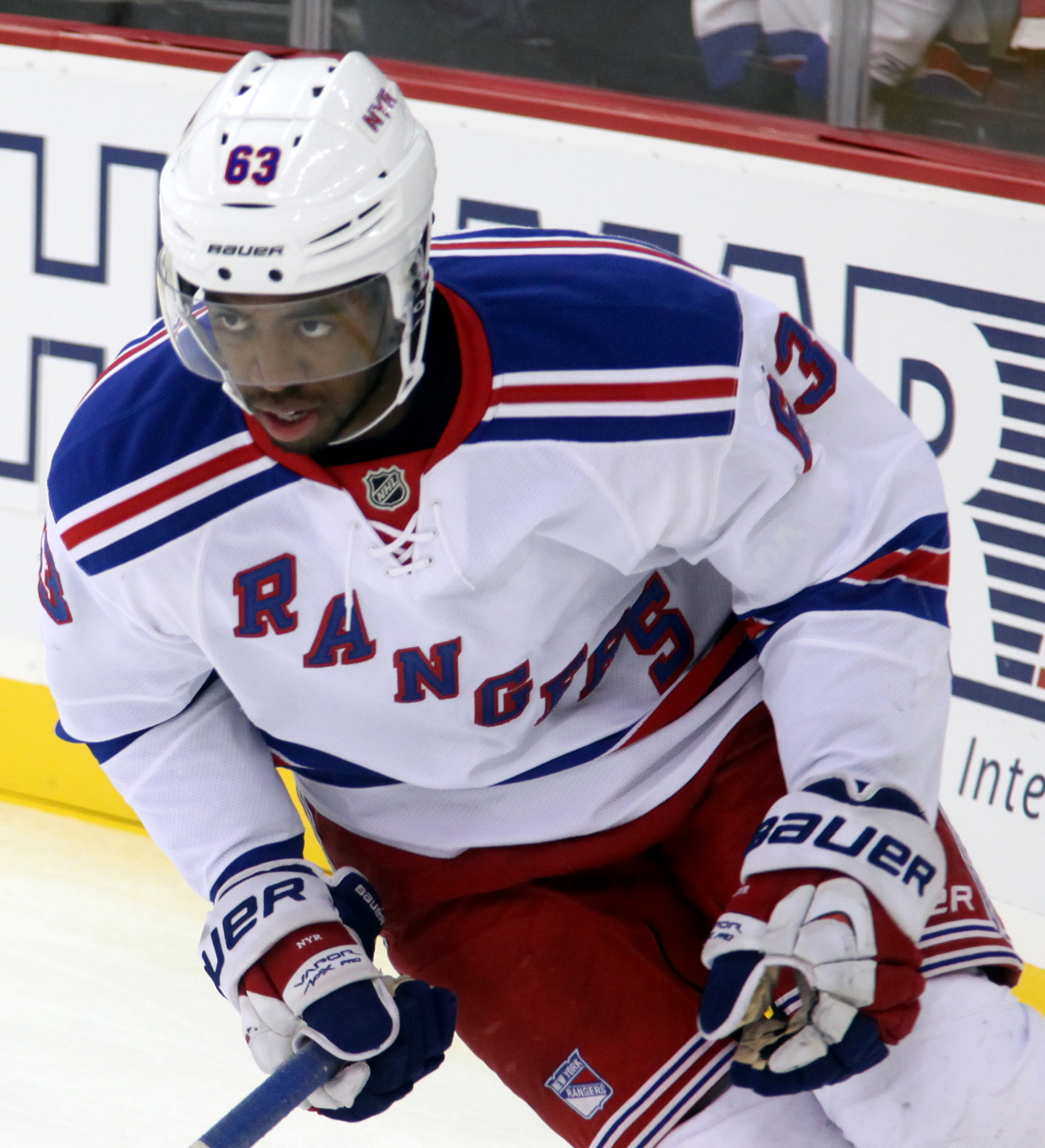
Anthony Duclair during a pre-season matchup against the New Jersey Devils.

On September 24, center Derek Stepan suffered a fractured fibula during on-ice fitness testing, meaning the Rangers would need to start the season without their number one center for four-to-six weeks.

At the conclusion of training camp, Anthony Duclair was named the 2014 winner of the Lars-Erik Sjoberg Award for being the best Rangers rookie in training camp. Duclair, a third round draft pick in 2013, turned heads in camp by scoring in three-straight pre-season games. Duclair was also the only teenager to score five points or more during the pre-season.

On October 6, defenseman Ryan McDonagh was named the 27th captain in New York Rangers history. Dan Girardi, Martin St. Louis, Marc Staal and Derek Stepan were named alternate captains.

== Regular season ==
On October 14, 2014, in a loss to the New York Islanders, Rick Nash established a franchise record by scoring a goal in each of the team's first four games of a season.

On December 27, the Rangers beat the New Jersey Devils 3–1 to extend their winning streak to eight in a row, which was the longest win streak by the Rangers since the 1974–75 season.

The Rangers became the first team to clinch a playoff spot on March 26 with a 5–1 win over the Ottawa Senators with 101 points. It is the eighth time in franchise history the team has reached the 100-point mark.

On April 2, 2015, the Rangers clinched the Metropolitan Division title with a win over the Minnesota Wild, 3–2. This win also made it their 26th road win of the season, a franchise record.

On April 4, 2015, the Rangers defeated the New Jersey Devils 6–1 for their 50th win of the season. This was the fourth time in franchise history that the Rangers achieved a 50-win season.

On April 7, 2015, the Rangers defeated the New Jersey Devils 4–2 to clinch the Presidents' Trophy, the third in franchise history. This win also made it their 27th league-leading road win.

On April 11, 2015, the Rangers beat the Washington Capitals 4–2 to win their 53rd game with 113 points. This was their most wins and points scored in franchise history, which were both surpassed by the 2023–24 team.

== Playoffs ==
In the first round of the Eastern Conference Quarterfinals, the Rangers played the Pittsburgh Penguins and won the series in five games. The series winner occurred in Game 5 in overtime from Carl Hagelin.

In the second round of the Eastern Conference Semi-finals, the Rangers played the Washington Capitals and won the series in seven games. In Game 5, Chris Kreider tied the game with 1:41 left in regulation, and Ryan McDonagh won it in overtime. In Game 7, Derek Stepan scored an overtime winner, making him the second Ranger to score a Game 7 overtime winner after Stéphane Matteau did so in Game 7 against the New Jersey Devils. During the second round, the Rangers set an NHL record in which 14-straight playoff games were decided by one goal. They also became the first team in NHL history to battle back from a 3–1 deficit in back-to-back seasons.

In the third round, the Rangers played the Tampa Bay Lightning. The Rangers, trailing 3-2, forced a Game 7 behind Derick Brassard's hat trick. However, the Rangers lost the series in seven games including two shutouts at home. With the Game 7 loss, it was the first time the Rangers have lost a playoff Game 7 at Madison Square Garden.

After the playoff loss, head coach Alain Vigneault revealed that McDonagh was playing with a broken foot throughout the playoffs. Additionally, Mats Zuccarello also suffered a serious brain contusion and concussion after taking a hit in the head from a shot by McDonagh. Keith Yandle revealed that he suffered a sprained acromioclavicular joint after taking a hit from Blake Comeau of the Pittsburgh Penguins during the first round of playoffs.

== Standings ==
Metropolitan Division
| Pos | Team | GP | W | L | OTL | ROW | GF | GA | GD | Pts |
|---|---|---|---|---|---|---|---|---|---|---|
| 1 | p – New York Rangers | 82 | 53 | 22 | 7 | 49 | 252 | 192 | +60 | 113 |
| 2 | x – Washington Capitals | 82 | 45 | 26 | 11 | 40 | 242 | 203 | +39 | 101 |
| 3 | x – New York Islanders | 82 | 47 | 28 | 7 | 40 | 252 | 230 | +22 | 101 |
| 4 | x – Pittsburgh Penguins | 82 | 43 | 27 | 12 | 39 | 221 | 210 | +11 | 98 |
| 5 | Columbus Blue Jackets | 82 | 42 | 35 | 5 | 33 | 236 | 250 | −14 | 89 |
| 6 | Philadelphia Flyers | 82 | 33 | 31 | 18 | 30 | 215 | 234 | −19 | 84 |
| 7 | New Jersey Devils | 82 | 32 | 36 | 14 | 27 | 181 | 216 | −35 | 78 |
| 8 | Carolina Hurricanes | 82 | 30 | 41 | 11 | 25 | 188 | 226 | −38 | 71 |

Source: National Hockey League
p – Clinched Presidents' Trophy; x – Clinched playoff spot

== Schedule and results ==
=== Pre-season ===
2014 pre-season: 3–3–0 (home: 2–1–0; road: 1–2–0)

| Game | Date | Opponent | Score | Record |
|---|---|---|---|---|
| 1 | September 22 | New Jersey Devils | 4–5 | 0–1–0 |
| 2 | September 26 | @ Chicago Blackhawks | 4–1 | 1–1–0 |
| 3 | September 29 | Philadelphia Flyers | 6–3 | 2–1–0 |
| 4 | September 30 | @ Philadelphia Flyers | 2–4 | 2–2–0 |
| 5 | October 3 | Chicago Blackhawks | 3–2 SO | 3–2–0 |
| 6 | October 4 | @ New Jersey Devils | 0–3 | 3–3–0 |

=== Regular season ===
2014–15 Game Log
October: 5–4–0, 10 Points (home: 3–2–0; road: 2–2–0)

| Game | Date | Opponent | Score | OT | Decision | Location | Attendance | Record | Points | Recap |
|---|---|---|---|---|---|---|---|---|---|---|
| 1 | October 9 | @ St. Louis | 3–2 | | Lundqvist | Scottrade Center | 19,183 | 1–0–0 | 2 | Recap |
| 2 | October 11 | @ Columbus | 2–5 | | Talbot | Nationwide Arena | 18,922 | 1–1–0 | 2 | Recap |
| 3 | October 12 | Toronto | 3–6 | | Lundqvist | Madison Square Garden | 18,006 | 1–2–0 | 2 | Recap |
| 4 | October 14 | NY Islanders | 3–6 | | Lundqvist | Madison Square Garden | 18,006 | 1–3–0 | 2 | Recap |
| 5 | October 17 | Carolina | 2–1 | SO | Lundqvist | Madison Square Garden | 18,006 | 2–3–0 | 4 | Recap |
| 6 | October 19 | San Jose | 4–0 | | Lundqvist | Madison Square Garden | 18,006 | 3–3–0 | 6 | Recap |
| 7 | October 21 | @ New Jersey | 4–3 | OT | Lundqvist | Prudential Center | 14,484 | 4–3–0 | 8 | Recap |
| 8 | October 25 | @ Montreal | 1–3 | | Lundqvist | Bell Centre | 21,287 | 4–4–0 | 8 | Recap |
| 9 | October 27 | Minnesota | 5–4 | | Lundqvist | Madison Square Garden | 18,006 | 5–4–0 | 10 | Recap |

November: 6–4–4, 16 Points (home: 5–2–3; road: 1–2–1)

| Game | Date | Opponent | Score | OT | Decision | Location | Attendance | Record | Points | Recap |
|---|---|---|---|---|---|---|---|---|---|---|
| 10 | November 1 | Winnipeg | 0–1 | SO | Lundqvist | Madison Square Garden | 18,006 | 5–4–1 | 11 | Recap |
| 11 | November 3 | St. Louis | 3–4 | SO | Talbot | Madison Square Garden | 18,006 | 5–4–2 | 12 | Recap |
| 12 | November 5 | Detroit | 4–3 | OT | Lundqvist | Madison Square Garden | 18,006 | 6–4–2 | 14 | Recap |
| 13 | November 8 | @ Toronto | 4–5 | | Talbot | Air Canada Centre | 19,320 | 6–5–2 | 14 | Recap |
| 14 | November 9 | Edmonton | 1–3 | | Lundqvist | Madison Square Garden | 18,006 | 6–6–2 | 14 | Recap |
| 15 | November 11 | Pittsburgh | 5–0 | | Lundqvist | Madison Square Garden | 18,006 | 7–6–2 | 16 | Recap |
| 16 | November 13 | Colorado | 3–4 | SO | Lundqvist | Madison Square Garden | 18,006 | 7–6–3 | 17 | Recap |
| 17 | November 15 | @ Pittsburgh | 2–3 | SO | Lundqvist | Consol Energy Center | 18,652 | 7–6–4 | 18 | Recap |
| 18 | November 17 | Tampa Bay | 1–5 | | Lundqvist | Madison Square Garden | 18,006 | 7–7–4 | 18 | Recap |
| 19 | November 19 | Philadelphia | 2–0 | | Talbot | Madison Square Garden | 18,006 | 8–7–4 | 20 | Recap |
| – | November 21 | @ Buffalo | Game rescheduled to February 20 due to hazardous weather in Buffalo. | | | | | | | |
| 20 | November 23 | Montreal | 5–0 | | Lundqvist | Madison Square Garden | 18,006 | 9–7–4 | 22 | Recap |
| 21 | November 26 | @ Tampa Bay | 3–4 | | Lundqvist | Tampa Bay Times Forum | 19,204 | 9–8–4 | 22 | Recap |
| 22 | November 28 | @ Philadelphia | 3–0 | | Talbot | Wells Fargo Center | 19,969 | 10–8–4 | 24 | Recap |
| 23 | November 29 | Philadelphia | 5–2 | | Lundqvist | Madison Square Garden | 18,006 | 11–8–4 | 26 | Recap |

December: 9–3–0, 18 Points (home: 4–1–0; road: 5–2–0)

| Game | Date | Opponent | Score | OT | Decision | Location | Attendance | Record | Points | Recap |
|---|---|---|---|---|---|---|---|---|---|---|
| 24 | December 1 | Tampa Bay | 3–6 | | Lundqvist | Madison Square Garden | 18,006 | 11–9–4 | 26 | Recap |
| 25 | December 6 | @ Detroit | 2–3 | | Talbot | Joe Louis Arena | 20,027 | 11–10–4 | 26 | Recap |
| 26 | December 8 | Pittsburgh | 4–3 | OT | Lundqvist | Madison Square Garden | 18,006 | 12–10–4 | 28 | Recap |
| 27 | December 13 | @ Vancouver | 5–1 | | Lundqvist | Rogers Arena | 18,870 | 13–10–4 | 30 | Recap |
| 28 | December 14 | @ Edmonton | 2–0 | | Lundqvist | Rexall Place | 16,839 | 14–10–4 | 32 | Recap |
| 29 | December 16 | @ Calgary | 5–2 | | Lundqvist | Scotiabank Saddledome | 18,352 | 15–10–4 | 34 | Recap |
| 30 | December 20 | @ Carolina | 3–2 | SO | Lundqvist | PNC Arena | 13,329 | 16–10–4 | 36 | Recap |
| 31 | December 21 | Carolina | 1–0 | | Talbot | Madison Square Garden | 18,006 | 17–10–4 | 38 | Recap |
| 32 | December 23 | Washington | 4–2 | | Lundqvist | Madison Square Garden | 18,006 | 18–10–4 | 40 | Recap |
| 33 | December 27 | New Jersey | 3–1 | | Lundqvist | Madison Square Garden | 18,006 | 19–10–4 | 42 | Recap |
| 34 | December 29 | @ Dallas | 2–3 | | Lundqvist | American Airlines Center | 18,532 | 19–11–4 | 42 | Recap |
| 35 | December 31 | @ Florida | 5–2 | | Lundqvist | BB&T Center | 15,090 | 20–11–4 | 44 | Recap |

January: 8–4–0, 16 Points (home: 3–2–0; road: 5–2–0)

| Game | Date | Opponent | Score | OT | Decision | Location | Attendance | Record | Points | Recap |
|---|---|---|---|---|---|---|---|---|---|---|
| 36 | January 3 | Buffalo | 6–1 | | Lundqvist | Madison Square Garden | 18,006 | 21–11–4 | 46 | Recap |
| 37 | January 7 | @ Anaheim | 4–1 | | Lundqvist | Honda Center | 17,174 | 22–11–4 | 48 | Recap |
| 38 | January 8 | @ Los Angeles | 4–3 | | Talbot | Staples Center | 18,230 | 23–11–4 | 50 | Recap |
| 39 | January 10 | @ San Jose | 3–1 | | Lundqvist | SAP Center at San Jose | 17,562 | 24–11–4 | 52 | Recap |
| 40 | January 13 | NY Islanders | 0–3 | | Lundqvist | Madison Square Garden | 18,006 | 24–12–4 | 52 | Recap |
| 41 | January 15 | @ Boston | 0–3 | | Talbot | TD Garden | 17,565 | 24–13–4 | 52 | Recap |
| 42 | January 16 | @ Columbus | 2–1 | | Lundqvist | Nationwide Arena | 16,104 | 25–13–4 | 54 | Recap |
| 43 | January 18 | @ Pittsburgh | 5–2 | | Lundqvist | Consol Energy Center | 18,687 | 26–13–4 | 56 | Recap |
| 44 | January 20 | Ottawa | 3–2 | OT | Lundqvist | Madison Square Garden | 18,006 | 27–13–4 | 58 | Recap |
| 45 | January 27 | @ NY Islanders | 1–4 | | Lundqvist | Nassau Coliseum | 16,170 | 27–14–4 | 58 | Recap |
| 46 | January 29 | Montreal | 0–1 | | Lundqvist | Madison Square Garden | 18,006 | 27–15–4 | 58 | Recap |
| 47 | January 31 | Carolina | 4–1 | | Lundqvist | Madison Square Garden | 18,006 | 28–15–4 | 60 | Recap |

February: 10–2–2, 22 Points (home: 5–0–2; road: 5–2–0)

| Game | Date | Opponent | Score | OT | Decision | Location | Attendance | Record | Points | Recap |
|---|---|---|---|---|---|---|---|---|---|---|
| 48 | February 2 | Florida | 6–3 | | Lundqvist | Madison Square Garden | 18,006 | 29–15–4 | 62 | Recap |
| 49 | February 4 | Boston | 3–2 | | Talbot | Madison Square Garden | 18,006 | 30–15–4 | 64 | Recap |
| 50 | February 7 | @ Nashville | 2–3 | | Talbot | Bridgestone Arena | 17,329 | 30–16–4 | 64 | Recap |
| 51 | February 8 | Dallas | 2–3 | OT | Talbot | Madison Square Garden | 18,006 | 30–16–5 | 65 | Recap |
| 52 | February 10 | @ Toronto | 5–4 | | Talbot | Air Canada Centre | 18,946 | 31–16–5 | 67 | Recap |
| 53 | February 12 | @ Colorado | 6–3 | | Talbot | Pepsi Center | 17,378 | 32–16–5 | 69 | Recap |
| 54 | February 14 | @ Arizona | 5–1 | | Talbot | Jobing.com Arena | 14,719 | 33–16–5 | 71 | Recap |
| 55 | February 16 | @ NY Islanders | 6–5 | | Talbot | Nassau Coliseum | 16,170 | 34–16–5 | 73 | Recap |
| 56 | February 19 | Vancouver | 4–5 | SO | Talbot | Madison Square Garden | 18,006 | 34–16–6 | 74 | Recap |
| 57 | February 20 | @ Buffalo | 3-1 | | Skapski | First Niagara Center | 19,070 | 35–16–6 | 76 | Recap |
| 58 | February 22 | Columbus | 4–3 | SO | Talbot | Madison Square Garden | 18,006 | 36–16–6 | 78 | Recap |
| 59 | February 24 | Calgary | 1–0 | | Talbot | Madison Square Garden | 18,006 | 37–16–6 | 80 | Recap |
| 60 | February 26 | Arizona | 4–3 | | Talbot | Madison Square Garden | 18,006 | 38–16–6 | 82 | Recap |
| 61 | February 28 | @ Philadelphia | 2–4 | | Talbot | Wells Fargo Center | 19,979 | 38–17–6 | 82 | Recap |

March: 10–4–1, 21 Points (home: 3–3–0; road: 7–1–1)

| Game | Date | Opponent | Score | OT | Decision | Location | Attendance | Record | Points | Recap |
|---|---|---|---|---|---|---|---|---|---|---|
| 62 | March 2 | Nashville | 4–1 | | Talbot | Madison Square Garden | 18,006 | 39–17–6 | 84 | Recap |
| 63 | March 4 | @ Detroit | 1–2 | OT | Talbot | Joe Louis Arena | 20,027 | 39–17–7 | 85 | Recap |
| 64 | March 8 | @ Chicago | 1–0 | OT | Talbot | United Center | 22,160 | 40–17–7 | 87 | Recap |
| 65 | March 10 | @ NY Islanders | 2–1 | | Talbot | Nassau Coliseum | 16,170 | 41–17–7 | 89 | Recap |
| 66 | March 11 | @ Washington | 3–1 | | Talbot | Verizon Center | 18,506 | 42–17–7 | 91 | Recap |
| 67 | March 14 | @ Buffalo | 2–0 | | Skapski | First Niagara Center | 19,070 | 43–17–7 | 93 | Recap |
| 68 | March 15 | Florida | 2–1 | | Talbot | Madison Square Garden | 18,006 | 44–17–7 | 95 | Recap |
| 69 | March 18 | Chicago | 0–1 | | Talbot | Madison Square Garden | 18,006 | 44–18–7 | 95 | Recap |
| 70 | March 21 | @ Carolina | 3–2 | SO | Talbot | PNC Arena | 13,404 | 45–18–7 | 97 | Recap |
| 71 | March 22 | Anaheim | 7–2 | | Talbot | Madison Square Garden | 18,006 | 46–18–7 | 99 | Recap |
| 72 | March 24 | Los Angeles | 2–4 | | Talbot | Madison Square Garden | 18,006 | 46–19–7 | 99 | Recap |
| 73 | March 26 | @ Ottawa | 5–1 | | Talbot | Canadian Tire Centre | 17,753 | 47–19–7 | 101 | Recap |
| 74 | March 28 | @ Boston | 2–4 | | Lundqvist | TD Garden | 17,565 | 47–20–7 | 101 | Recap |
| 75 | March 29 | Washington | 2–5 | | Talbot | Madison Square Garden | 18,006 | 47–21–7 | 101 | Recap |
| 76 | March 31 | @ Winnipeg | 3–2 | | Lundqvist | MTS Centre | 15,016 | 48–21–7 | 103 | Recap |

April: 5–1–0, 10 Points (home: 2–1–0; road: 3–0–0)

| Game | Date | Opponent | Score | OT | Decision | Location | Attendance | Record | Points | Recap |
|---|---|---|---|---|---|---|---|---|---|---|
| 77 | April 2 | @ Minnesota | 3–2 | | Lundqvist | Xcel Energy Center | 19,244 | 49–21–7 | 105 | Recap |
| 78 | April 4 | New Jersey | 6–1 | | Lundqvist | Madison Square Garden | 18,006 | 50–21–7 | 107 | Recap |
| 79 | April 6 | Columbus | 4–3 | OT | Lundqvist | Madison Square Garden | 18,006 | 51–21–7 | 109 | Recap |
| 80 | April 7 | @ New Jersey | 4–2 | | Talbot | Prudential Center | 16,592 | 52–21–7 | 111 | Recap |
| 81 | April 9 | Ottawa | 0–3 | | Lundqvist | Madison Square Garden | 18,006 | 52–22–7 | 111 | Recap |
| 82 | April 11 | @ Washington | 4–2 | | Lundqvist | Verizon Center | 18,506 | 53–22–7 | 113 | Recap |

Win (2 Points) Loss (0 points) Overtime/shootout loss (1 point)

=== Playoffs ===
2015 Stanley Cup playoffs
Eastern Conference First Round vs. (WC2) Pittsburgh Penguins – Rangers won series 4–1 (home: 2–1 Away: 2–0)

| Game | Date | Opponent | Score | Decision | Series |
|---|---|---|---|---|---|
| 1 | April 16 | Pittsburgh Penguins | 2–1 | Lundqvist (1–0) | Rangers lead 1–0 |
| 2 | April 18 | Pittsburgh Penguins | 3–4 | Lundqvist (1–1) | Series tied 1–1 |
| 3 | April 20 | @ Pittsburgh Penguins | 2–1 | Lundqvist (2–1) | Rangers lead 2–1 |
| 4 | April 22 | @ Pittsburgh Penguins | 2–1 OT | Lundqvist (3–1) | Rangers lead 3–1 |
| 5 | April 24 | Pittsburgh Penguins | 2–1 OT | Lundqvist (4–1) | Rangers win series 4–1 |

Eastern Conference Second Round vs. (M2) Washington Capitals – Rangers won series 4–3 (home: 3–1 Away: 1–2)

| Game | Date | Opponent | Score | Decision | Series |
|---|---|---|---|---|---|
| 1 | April 30 | Washington Capitals | 1–2 | Lundqvist (4–2) | Capitals lead 1–0 |
| 2 | May 2 | Washington Capitals | 3–2 | Lundqvist (5–2) | Series tied 1–1 |
| 3 | May 4 | @ Washington Capitals | 0–1 | Lundqvist (5–3) | Capitals lead 2–1 |
| 4 | May 6 | @ Washington Capitals | 1–2 | Lundqvist (5–4) | Capitals lead 3–1 |
| 5 | May 8 | Washington Capitals | 2–1 OT | Lundqvist (6–4) | Capitals lead 3–2 |
| 6 | May 10 | @ Washington Capitals | 4–3 | Lundqvist (7–4) | Series tied 3–3 |
| 7 | May 13 | Washington Capitals | 2–1 OT | Lundqvist (8–4) | Rangers win series 4–3 |

Eastern Conference Final vs. (A2) Tampa Bay Lightning – Lightning won series 4–3 (home: 1–3 Away: 2–1)

| Game | Date | Opponent | Score | Decision | Series |
|---|---|---|---|---|---|
| 1 | May 16 | Tampa Bay Lightning | 2–1 | Lundqvist (9–4) | Rangers lead 1–0 |
| 2 | May 18 | Tampa Bay Lightning | 2–6 | Lundqvist (9–5) | Series tied 1–1 |
| 3 | May 20 | @ Tampa Bay Lightning | 5–6 OT | Lundqvist (9–6) | Lightning lead 2–1 |
| 4 | May 22 | @ Tampa Bay Lightning | 5–1 | Lundqvist (10–6) | Series tied 2–2 |
| 5 | May 24 | Tampa Bay Lightning | 0–2 | Lundqvist (10–7) | Lightning lead 3–2 |
| 6 | May 26 | @ Tampa Bay Lightning | 7–3 | Lundqvist (11–7) | Series tied 3–3 |
| 7 | May 29 | Tampa Bay Lightning | 0–2 | Lundqvist (11–8) | Lightning win series 4–3 |

Win Loss

== Player statistics ==
Final Stats

Skaters

Regular season
| Player | GP | G | A | Pts | +/− | PIM |
|---|---|---|---|---|---|---|
| Rick Nash | 79 | 42 | 27 | 69 | 29 | 36 |
| Derick Brassard | 80 | 19 | 41 | 60 | 9 | 34 |
| Derek Stepan | 68 | 16 | 39 | 55 | 26 | 22 |
| Martin St. Louis | 74 | 21 | 31 | 52 | 12 | 20 |
| Mats Zuccarello | 78 | 15 | 34 | 49 | 17 | 45 |
| Chris Kreider | 80 | 21 | 25 | 46 | 24 | 88 |
| Kevin Hayes | 79 | 17 | 28 | 45 | 15 | 22 |
| Carl Hagelin | 82 | 17 | 18 | 35 | 18 | 46 |
| Ryan McDonagh | 71 | 8 | 25 | 33 | 23 | 26 |
| Dominic Moore | 82 | 10 | 17 | 27 | 5 | 28 |
| Kevin Klein | 65 | 9 | 17 | 26 | 24 | 25 |
| J. T. Miller | 58 | 10 | 13 | 23 | 5 | 23 |
| Dan Boyle | 65 | 9 | 11 | 20 | 18 | 20 |
| Marc Staal | 80 | 5 | 15 | 20 | 18 | 42 |
| Dan Girardi | 82 | 4 | 16 | 20 | 12 | 22 |
| Lee Stempniak^{‡} | 53 | 9 | 9 | 18 | 7 | 18 |
| Jesper Fast | 58 | 6 | 8 | 14 | −1 | 8 |
| Matt Hunwick | 55 | 2 | 9 | 11 | 17 | 16 |
| Keith Yandle^{†} | 21 | 2 | 9 | 11 | 6 | 8 |
| Anthony Duclair^{‡} | 18 | 1 | 6 | 7 | 4 | 4 |
| Tanner Glass | 66 | 1 | 5 | 6 | −12 | 98 |
| John Moore^{‡} | 38 | 1 | 5 | 6 | 7 | 19 |
| James Sheppard^{†} | 14 | 2 | 0 | 2 | −1 | 9 |
| Chris Mueller | 7 | 1 | 1 | 2 | −1 | 0 |
| Michael Kostka | 7 | 0 | 1 | 1 | 1 | 0 |
| Chris Summers^{†} | 3 | 0 | 0 | 0 | 0 | 0 |
| Ryan Bourque | 1 | 0 | 0 | 0 | −1 | 0 |
| Oscar Lindberg | 1 | 0 | 0 | 0 | 0 | 0 |
| Dylan McIlrath | 1 | 0 | 0 | 0 | 0 | 9 |
| Conor Allen | 4 | 0 | 0 | 0 | −1 | 4 |
| Ryan Malone | 6 | 0 | 0 | 0 | −4 | 4 |

Playoffs
| Player | GP | G | A | Pts | +/− | PIM |
|---|---|---|---|---|---|---|
| Derick Brassard | 19 | 9 | 7 | 16 | 9 | 20 |
| Rick Nash | 19 | 5 | 9 | 14 | 8 | 4 |
| Derek Stepan | 19 | 5 | 7 | 12 | −1 | 10 |
| Keith Yandle | 19 | 2 | 9 | 11 | 7 | 10 |
| Dan Boyle | 19 | 3 | 7 | 10 | −3 | 2 |
| Chris Kreider | 19 | 7 | 2 | 9 | −1 | 14 |
| Ryan McDonagh | 19 | 3 | 6 | 9 | 2 | 8 |
| J. T. Miller | 19 | 1 | 7 | 8 | 3 | 2 |
| Kevin Hayes | 19 | 2 | 5 | 7 | −3 | 2 |
| Martin St. Louis | 19 | 1 | 6 | 7 | −1 | 4 |
| Jesper Fast | 19 | 3 | 3 | 6 | 1 | 2 |
| Carl Hagelin | 19 | 2 | 3 | 5 | −4 | 6 |
| Dan Girardi | 19 | 0 | 4 | 4 | 5 | 4 |
| Kevin Klein | 14 | 0 | 4 | 4 | −1 | 2 |
| Dominic Moore | 19 | 1 | 2 | 3 | −7 | 12 |
| James Sheppard | 13 | 1 | 1 | 2 | 2 | 8 |
| Mats Zuccarello | 5 | 0 | 2 | 2 | 1 | 0 |
| Tanner Glass | 19 | 0 | 1 | 1 | −2 | 31 |
| Marc Staal | 19 | 0 | 1 | 1 | −8 | 10 |
| Matt Hunwick | 6 | 0 | 0 | 0 | 0 | 0 |

Goaltenders

Regular season
| Player | GP | GS | TOI | W | L | OT | GA | GAA | SA | SV% | SO | G | A | PIM |
|---|---|---|---|---|---|---|---|---|---|---|---|---|---|---|
| Henrik Lundqvist | 46 | 46 | 2743 | 30 | 13 | 3 | 103 | 2.25 | 1329 | .922 | 5 | 0 | 1 | 0 |
| Cam Talbot | 36 | 34 | 2095 | 21 | 9 | 4 | 77 | 2.21 | 1038 | .926 | 5 | 0 | 0 | 0 |
| Mackenzie Skapski | 2 | 2 | 120 | 2 | 0 | 0 | 1 | 0.50 | 45 | .978 | 1 | 0 | 0 | 0 |

Playoffs
| Player | GP | GS | TOI | W | L | GA | GAA | SA | SV% | SO | G | A | PIM |
|---|---|---|---|---|---|---|---|---|---|---|---|---|---|
| Henrik Lundqvist | 19 | 19 | 1166 | 11 | 8 | 41 | 2.11 | 570 | .928 | 0 | 0 | 0 | 0 |

^{†}Denotes player spent time with another team before joining the Rangers. Stats reflect time with the Rangers only.
^{‡}Denotes player was traded mid-season. Stats reflect time with the Rangers only.
Bold/italics denotes franchise record.

=== Player injuries ===
Updated as of May 2, 2015

| Player | Injury | Date | Returned | Games missed |
|---|---|---|---|---|
| Derek Stepan | Lower-body-injury (broken leg) | September 24, 2014 | November 8, 2014 | 12 games |
| Dan Boyle | Upper-body-injury (broken hand) | October 9, 2014 | November 13, 2014 | 14 games |
| Ryan McDonagh | Upper-body-injury (shoulder) | November 1, 2014 | November 28, 2014 | 10 games |
| Kevin Klein | Lower-body-injury (foot) | November 1, 2014 | November 5, 2014 | 1 game |
| Mats Zuccarello | Undisclosed | November 1, 2014 | November 5, 2014 | 1 game |
| Henrik Lundqvist | Vascular injury (neck) | February 4, 2015 | March 28, 2015 | 25 games |
| Jesper Fast | Knee sprain | February 8, 2015 | March 2, 2015 | 11 games |
| Rick Nash | Neck spasms | February 24, 2015 | February 26, 2015 | 1 game |
| Kevin Klein | Upper-body-injury (arm) | March 11, 2015 | April 30, 2015 | 16 games |
| Martin St. Louis | Lower-body-injury (leg) | March 15, 2015 | April 2, 2015 | 8 games |
| Total | | | | 74 games |

=== Player suspensions/fines ===
| Player | Explanation | Length | Salary | Date issued |
|---|---|---|---|---|
| John Moore | Illegal check to the head of Minnesota Wild forward Erik Haula during NHL Game No. 122 in New York on Monday, October 27, 2014, at 7:12 of the second period. | 5 games | $51,859.75 | October 29, 2014 |
| Tanner Glass | Butt-ending of Boston Bruins defenseman Adam McQuaid during NHL Game No. 1116 in Boston on Saturday, March 28, 2015, at 20:00 of the third period. | – | $3,897.85 | March 28, 2015 |

== Awards and records ==
=== Awards ===
Regular season
| Player | Award | Date |
|---|---|---|
| H. Lundqvist | NHL Third Star of the Week | December 15, 2014 |
| R. Nash | NHL All-Star game selection | January 10, 2015 |
| R. Nash | NHL All-Star game assistant captain | January 14, 2015 |
| C. Talbot | NHL Third Star of the Week | March 9, 2015 |
| C. Talbot | NHL Second Star of the Week | March 16, 2015 |
| C. Talbot | Steven McDonald Extra Effort Award | April 8, 2015 |
| R. Nash | Rangers' MVP; Players' Player Award | April 8, 2015 |

=== Milestones ===
Regular season
| Player | Milestone | Reached |
|---|---|---|
| Anthony Duclair | 1st career NHL game | October 9, 2014 |
| Anthony Duclair | 1st career NHL assist 1st career NHL point | October 11, 2014 |
| Kevin Hayes | 1st career NHL game | October 12, 2014 |
| Kevin Hayes | 1st career NHL goal 1st career NHL point | October 19, 2014 |
| Kevin Hayes | 1st career NHL assist | October 21, 2014 |
| Anthony Duclair | 1st career NHL goal | October 27, 2014 |
| Matt Hunwick | 300th career NHL game | November 1, 2014 |
| Chris Kreider | 100th career NHL game | November 3, 2014 |
| Carl Hagelin | 100th career NHL point | November 9, 2014 |
| Mats Zuccarello | 100th career NHL point | November 11, 2014 |
| Derek Stepan | 200th career NHL point | November 11, 2014 |
| Carl Hagelin | 200th career NHL game | November 13, 2014 |
| Rick Nash | 800th career NHL game | November 15, 2014 |
| Derek Stepan | 300th career NHL game | November 17, 2014 |
| Jesper Fast | 1st career NHL assist 1st career NHL point | November 23, 2014 |
| Rick Nash | 300th career NHL assist | November 26, 2014 |
| Martin St. Louis | 1,000th career NHL point | November 28, 2014 |
| Jesper Fast | 1st career NHL goal | November 29, 2014 |
| Tanner Glass | 400th career NHL game | December 14, 2014 |
| Dan Girardi | 600th career NHL game | December 21, 2014 |
| Henrik Lundqvist | 600th career NHL game | December 27, 2014 |
| Kevin Klein | 100th career NHL point | December 31, 2014 |
| Martin St. Louis | 1,100th career NHL game | January 13, 2015 |
| Marc Staal | 500th career NHL game | January 13, 2015 |
| John Moore | 200th career NHL game | January 13, 2015 |
| Alain Vigneault | 500th career NHL win (coach) | February 14, 2015 |
| Lee Stempniak | 200th career NHL assist | February 16, 2015 |
| Mackenzie Skapski | 1st career NHL game 1st career NHL win | February 20, 2015 |
| Mats Zuccarello | 200th career NHL game | February 22, 2015 |
| Oscar Lindberg | 1st career NHL game | February 24, 2015 |
| Dan Boyle | 1,000th career NHL game | March 4, 2015 |
| Ryan McDonagh | 300th career NHL game | March 10, 2015 |
| Mackenzie Skapski | 1st career NHL shutout | March 14, 2015 |
| J. T. Miller | 100th career NHL game | March 15, 2015 |
| Ryan McDonagh | 100th career NHL assist | April 4, 2015 |
| Ryan Bourque | 1st career NHL game | April 9, 2015 |
| Derick Brassard | 100th career NHL goal | April 11, 2015 |

Playoffs
| Player | Milestone | Reached |
|---|---|---|
| Kevin Hayes | 1st career NHL playoff game | April 16, 2015 |
| Kevin Hayes | 1st career NHL playoff goal 1st career NHL playoff point | April 22, 2015 |
| Jesper Fast | 1st career NHL playoff goal | April 30, 2015 |
| Henrik Lundqvist | 100th career NHL playoff game | May 4, 2015 |
| J. T. Miller | 1st career NHL playoff goal | May 26, 2015 |

== Transactions ==
The Rangers have been involved in the following transactions during the 2014–15 season:

=== Trades ===
| June 27, 2014 | To Vancouver Canucks: Derek Dorsett | To New York Rangers: ANA's 3rd-round pick in 2014 |
| June 28, 2014 | To Washington Capitals: 3rd-round pick in 2014 | To New York Rangers: 4th-round pick in 2014; CHI's 4th-round pick in 2014 |
| June 28, 2014 | To Tampa Bay Lightning: 4th-round pick in 2014 | To New York Rangers: 5th-round pick in 2014; STL's 5th round pick in 2014 |
| October 6, 2014 | To Florida Panthers: Steven Kampfer; Andrew Yogan | To New York Rangers: Joey Crabb |
| March 1, 2015 | To Arizona Coyotes: John Moore; Anthony Duclair; Conditional 1st-round pick in 2016; 2nd round pick in 2015 | To New York Rangers: Keith Yandle; Chris Summers; 4th-round pick in 2016 |
| March 1, 2015 | To Winnipeg Jets: Lee Stempniak | To New York Rangers: Carl Klingberg |
| March 1, 2015 | To San Jose Sharks: 4th-round pick in 2016 | To New York Rangers: James Sheppard |
| June 1, 2015 | To Tampa Bay Lightning: Daniel Walcott | To New York Rangers: NYR's 7th-round pick in 2015 |

=== Free agents acquired ===
| Date | Player | Former team | Contract terms (in U.S. dollars) | Ref |
| July 1, 2014 | Dan Boyle | San Jose Sharks | 2 years, $9 million | |
| July 1, 2014 | Chris Mueller | Dallas Stars | 1 year, $600,000 | |
| July 1, 2014 | Tanner Glass | Pittsburgh Penguins | 3 years, $4.35 million | |
| July 1, 2014 | Mike Kostka | Tampa Bay Lightning | 1 year, $650,000 | |
| July 1, 2014 | Cedrick Desjardins | Tampa Bay Lightning | 2 years, $1.2 million | |
| July 1, 2014 | Steven Kampfer | Iowa Wild | 1 year, $550,000 | |
| July 1, 2014 | Matt Hunwick | Colorado Avalanche | 1 year, $600,000 | |
| July 1, 2014 | Chris Bourque | EHC Biel | 1 year, $600,000 | |
| July 1, 2014 | Nick Tarnasky | Hamilton Bulldogs | 1 year, $1.725 million | |
| July 16, 2014 | Matthew Lombardi | Geneve-Servette HC | 2 years, $1.6 million | |
| July 19, 2014 | Lee Stempniak | Pittsburgh Penguins | 1 year, $900,000 | |
| August 20, 2014 | Kevin Hayes | Boston College | 3 years, $7.5 million entry-level contract | |
| September 11, 2014 | Ryan Malone | Tampa Bay Lightning | 1 year, $700,000 | |

=== Free agents lost ===
| Date | Player | New team | Contract terms (in U.S. dollars) | Ref |
| July 1, 2014 | Benoit Pouliot | Edmonton Oilers | 5 years, $20 million | |
| July 1, 2014 | Anton Stralman | Tampa Bay Lightning | 5 years, $22.5 million | |
| July 1, 2014 | Brad Richards | Chicago Blackhawks | 1 year, $2 million | |
| July 1, 2014 | Brian Boyle | Tampa Bay Lightning | 3 years, $6 million | |
| July 1, 2014 | Stu Bickel | Minnesota Wild | 1 year, $600,000 | |
| August 1, 2014 | Justin Falk | Minnesota Wild | 1 year, $700,000 | |
| October 5, 2014 | Daniel Carcillo | Chicago Blackhawks | 1 year, $550,000 | |
| October 6, 2014 | Raphael Diaz | Calgary Flames | 1 year, $700,000 | |

=== Claimed via waivers ===
| Player | Previous team | Date |

=== Lost via waivers ===
| Player | New team | Date |

=== Lost via retirement ===
Player

=== Player signings ===
| Date | Player | Contract terms (in U.S. dollars) | Ref |
| July 1, 2014 | Dominic Moore | 2 years, $3 million | |
| July 22, 2014 | Mats Zuccarello | 1 year, $3.5 million | |
| July 23, 2014 | Chris Kreider | 2 years, $4.95 million | |
| July 27, 2014 | Derick Brassard | 5 years, $25 million | |
| August 8, 2014 | Ryan Bourque | 2 years, $1.125 million | |
| August 19, 2014 | Danny Kristo | 1 year, $826,875 | |
| September 10, 2014 | John Moore | 1 year, $850,500 | |
| December 19, 2014 | Cam Talbot | 1 year, $1.45 million contract extension | |
| January 18, 2015 | Marc Staal | 6 years, $34.2 million contract extension | |
| March 1, 2015 | Mats Zuccarello | 4 years, $18 million contract extension | |
| March 10, 2015 | Adam Tambellini | entry-level contract | |
| April 1, 2015 | Brady Skjei | entry-level contract | |

=== Other ===
| Name | Date | Details |
|---|---|---|
| Darryl Williams | August 5, 2014 | Named as Assistant Coach |

== Draft picks ==
Below are the New York Rangers' selections made at the 2014 NHL entry draft, held on June 27–28, 2014 at the Wells Fargo Center in Philadelphia.

| Round | # | Player | Pos | Nationality | College/Junior/Club team (League) |
|---|---|---|---|---|---|
| 2 | 59 | Brandon Halverson | Goaltender | United States | Sault Ste. Marie Greyhounds (OHL) |
| 3 | 85^{a} | Keegan Iverson | Center | United States | Portland Winterhawks (WHL) |
| 4 | 104^{b} | Ryan Mantha | Defenseman | United States | Sioux City Musketeers (USHL) |
| 4 | 118^{c} | Igor Shesterkin | Goaltender | Russia | JHC Spartak (MHL) |
| 5 | 122^{d} | Richard Nejezchleb | Right wing | Czech Republic | Brandon Wheat Kings (WHL) |
| 5 | 140^{e} | Daniel Walcott | Defenseman | Canada | Blainville-Boisbriand Armada (QMJHL) |
| 5 | 142^{f} | Tyler Nanne | Defenseman | United States | Edina High School (MSHSL) |

Draft notes

- The Rangers' first-round pick went to the Tampa Bay Lightning as the result of a trade on March 5, 2014, that sent Martin St. Louis to New York in exchange for Ryan Callahan, a first-round pick in 2015 and this pick (being conditional at the time of the trade). The condition – Tampa Bay will receive a first-round pick in 2014 if the Rangers advance to the 2014 Eastern Conference Final – was converted on May 13, 2014.
- ^{a} The Anaheim Ducks' third-round pick went to the New York Rangers as the result of a trade on June 27, 2014, that sent Derek Dorsett to Vancouver in exchange for this pick.
  Vancouver previously acquired this pick as the result of a trade on June 27, 2014, that sent Ryan Kesler and a third-round pick in 2015 to Anaheim in exchange for Nick Bonino, Luca Sbisa, a first-round pick in 2014 (24th overall) and this pick.
- The New York Rangers' third-round pick went to the Washington Capitals as the result of a trade on June 28, 2014, that sent a fourth-round pick in 2014 (104th overall) and Chicago's fourth-round pick in 2014 (118th overall) to New York in exchange for this pick.
- ^{b} The Washington Capitals' fourth-round pick went to the New York Rangers as the result of a trade on June 28, 2014, that sent a third-round pick in 2014 (89th overall) to Washington in exchange for Chicago's fourth-round pick in 2014 (118th overall) and this pick.
- ^{c} The Chicago Blackhawks' fourth-round pick went to the New York Rangers as the result of a trade on June 28, 2014, that sent a third-round pick in 2014 (89th overall) to Washington in exchange for a fourth-round pick in 2014 (104th overall) and this pick.
  Washington previously acquired this pick as the result of a trade on May 1, 2014, that sent Jaroslav Halak to the New York Islanders in exchange for this pick.
  New York previously acquired this pick as the result of a trade on February 6, 2014, that sent Peter Regin and Pierre-Marc Bouchard to Chicago in exchange for this pick.
- The New York Rangers' fourth-round pick went to the Tampa Bay Lightning as the result of a trade on June 28, 2014, that sent a fifth-round pick in 2014 (120th overall) and St. Louis' fifth-round pick in 2014 (142nd overall) to New York in exchange for this pick.
- ^{d} The Florida Panthers' fifth-round pick will go to the Rangers as the result of a trade on July 20, 2012, that sent Casey Wellman to Florida in exchange for this pick.
- ^{e} The Tampa Bay Lightning's fifth-round pick went to the New York Rangers as the result of a trade on June 28, 2014, that sent a fourth-round pick in 2014 (119th overall) to Tampa Bay in exchange for St. Louis' fifth-round pick in 2014 (142nd overall) and this pick.
- ^{f} The St. Louis Blues' fifth-round pick went to the New York Rangers as the result of a trade on June 28, 2014, that sent a fourth-round pick in 2014 (119th overall) to Tampa Bay in exchange for a fifth-round pick in 2014 (140th overall) and this pick.
  Tampa Bay previously acquired this pick as the result of a trade on July 10, 2012, that sent fourth-round picks in 2013 and 2014 to St. Louis in exchange for B. J. Crombeen and this pick.
- The Rangers' fifth-round pick will go to the San Jose Sharks as the result of a trade on April 2, 2013, that sent Ryane Clowe to New York in exchange for a second-round pick in 2013, Florida's third-round pick in 2013 and this pick (being conditional at the time of the trade). The condition – If Clowe does not re-sign with New York and the Rangers do not advance to the Eastern Conference Final, then San Jose will receive a fifth-round pick in 2014 – was converted on July 5, 2013.
- The New York Rangers' sixth-round pick went to the Chicago Blackhawks as the result of a trade on June 27, 2014, that sent a first-round pick and Florida's third-round pick both in 2014 (27th and 62nd overall) to San Jose in exchange for a first-round pick in 2014 (20th overall) and this pick.
  San Jose previously acquired this pick as the result of a trade on January 16, 2013, that sent Brandon Mashinter to New York in exchange for Tommy Grant and this pick (being conditional at the time of the trade). The condition – San Jose will receive a sixth-round pick in 2014 if Mashinter was a signed player on the Rangers reserve list at some point during the 2013–14 NHL season. – was converted on August 5, 2013, when Mashinter re-signed with the Rangers for the 2013–14 NHL season.
- The Rangers' seventh-round pick will go to the Los Angeles Kings as result of a trade on January 4, 2014, that sent Daniel Carcillo to New York in exchange for this conditional pick.
