= 2014–15 Winnipeg Jets season =

National Hockey League team season

2014–15 Winnipeg Jets
- Division: 5th Central
- Conference: 7th Western
- 2014–15 record: 43–26–13
- Home record: 23–13–5
- Road record: 20–13–8
- Goals for: 230
- Goals against: 210

Team information
- General manager: Kevin Cheveldayoff
- Coach: Paul Maurice
- Captain: Andrew Ladd
- Alternate captains: Mark Stuart; Blake Wheeler
- Arena: MTS Centre
- Average attendance: 15,037 (100.2%) (41 games)

Team leaders
- Goals: Blake Wheeler (26)
- Assists: Andrew Ladd (38)
- Points: Andrew Ladd (62)
- Penalty minutes: Dustin Byfuglien (124)
- Plus/minus: Blake Wheeler (+26)
- Wins: Ondrej Pavelec (22)
- Goals against average: Ondrej Pavelec (2.28)

The 2014–15 Winnipeg Jets season was the 32nd season of play for the National Hockey League (NHL) franchise that was established on June 22, 1979, 40th season for the organization overall, and the fourth in Winnipeg since the franchise relocated from Atlanta following the conclusion of the 2010–11 season.

== Regular season ==
On April 9, 2015, the Jets qualified for the 2015 Stanley Cup playoffs, marking the return of playoff hockey to Winnipeg for the first time since the 1996 Stanley Cup playoffs. The Jets would set a franchise record, with 99 points, finishing with a 43-26-13 record.

== Playoffs ==
The Winnipeg Jets entered the playoffs as the Western Conference's second wild card. The Jets faced the Ducks in the opening round, but were swept in four straight games. In the first three games, the Jets had leads going into the third period, but couldn't hold them. Overall in the series, the Ducks outscored the Jets 16–9. The Ducks outscored the Jets 10–1, after the 2nd intermission.

== Standings ==
Central Division
Pos	Team	GP	W	L	OTL	ROW	GF	GA	GD	Pts
1	y – St. Louis Blues	82	51	24	7	42	248	201	+47	109
2	x – Nashville Predators	82	47	25	10	41	232	208	+24	104
3	x – Chicago Blackhawks	82	48	28	6	39	229	189	+40	102
4	x – Minnesota Wild	82	46	28	8	42	231	201	+30	100
5	x – Winnipeg Jets	82	43	26	13	36	230	210	+20	99
6	Dallas Stars	82	41	31	10	37	261	260	+1	92
7	Colorado Avalanche	82	39	31	12	29	219	227	−8	90

Source: National Hockey League
x – Clinched playoff spot; y – Clinched division

Western Conference Wild Card
Pos	Div	Team	GP	W	L	OTL	ROW	GF	GA	GD	Pts
1	CE	x – Minnesota Wild	82	46	28	8	42	231	201	+30	100
2	CE	x – Winnipeg Jets	82	43	26	13	36	230	210	+20	99
3	PA	Los Angeles Kings	82	40	27	15	38	220	205	+15	95
4	CE	Dallas Stars	82	41	31	10	37	261	260	+1	92
5	CE	Colorado Avalanche	82	39	31	12	29	219	227	−8	90
6	PA	San Jose Sharks	82	40	33	9	36	228	232	−4	89
7	PA	Edmonton Oilers	82	24	44	14	19	198	283	−85	62
8	PA	Arizona Coyotes	82	24	50	8	19	170	272	−102	56

Source: National Hockey League
x – Clinched playoff spot

== Schedule and results ==
=== Pre-season ===
2014 preseason game log: 3–4–0 (Home: 3–1–0; Road: 0–3–0)
#	Date	Visitor	Score	Home	OT	Decision	Attendance	Record	Recap
1	September 22	Minnesota	1–2	Winnipeg		Hutchinson	14,448	1–0–0	Recap
2	September 24	Edmonton	3–2	Winnipeg		Hutchinson	14,723	1–1–0	Recap
3	September 27	Winnipeg	3–4	Minnesota		Pavelec	16,822	1–2–0	Recap
4	September 29	Winnipeg	1–3	Edmonton		Hutchinson	16,839	1–3–0	Recap
5	September 30	Ottawa	1–2	Winnipeg		Pavelec	14,560	2–3–0	Recap
6	October 2	Winnipeg	2–4	Calgary		Hutchinson	19,289	2–4–0	Recap
7	October 4	Calgary	1–4	Winnipeg		Pavelec	14,790	3–4–0	Recap

=== Regular season ===
2014–15 Game Log

October: 4–5–1 (Home: 2–3–0; Road: 2–2–1)
#	Date	Visitor	Score	Home	OT	Decision	Attendance	Record	Pts	Recap
1	October 9	Winnipeg	6–2	Arizona		Pavelec	17,125	1–0–0	2	Recap
2	October 11	Winnipeg	0–3	San Jose		Pavelec	17,562	1–1–0	2	Recap
3	October 12	Winnipeg	1–4	Los Angeles		Hutchinson	18,230	1–2–0	2	Recap
4	October 17	Nashville	2–0	Winnipeg		Pavelec	15,016	1–3–0	2	Recap
5	October 19	Calgary	4–1	Winnipeg		Pavelec	15,016	1–4–0	2	Recap
6	October 21	Carolina	1–3	Winnipeg		Pavelec	15,016	2–4–0	4	Recap
7	October 24	Tampa Bay	4–2	Winnipeg		Pavelec	15,016	2–5–0	4	Recap
8	October 26	Colorado	1–2	Winnipeg	OT	Pavelec	15,016	3–5–0	6	Recap
9	October 28	Winnipeg	4–3	NY Islanders		Pavelec	11,508	4–5–0	8	Recap
10	October 30	Winnipeg	1–2	New Jersey	SO	Pavelec	12,897	4–5–1	9	Recap

November: 8–4–3 (Home: 2–2–1; Road: 6–2–2)
#	Date	Visitor	Score	Home	OT	Decision	Attendance	Record	Pts	Recap
11	November 1	Winnipeg	1–0	NY Rangers	SO	Pavelec	18,006	5–5–1	11	Recap
12	November 2	Winnipeg	1–0	Chicago		Hutchinson	21,204	6–5–1	13	Recap
13	November 4	Nashville	1–3	Winnipeg		Pavelec	15,016	7–5–1	15	Recap
14	November 6	Pittsburgh	4–3	Winnipeg	SO	Pavelec	15,016	7–5–2	16	Recap
15	November 8	Winnipeg	2–1	Ottawa	SO	Pavelec	19,189	8–5–2	18	Recap
16	November 11	Winnipeg	0–3	Montreal		Pavelec	21,287	8–6–2	18	Recap
17	November 13	Winnipeg	3–1	Carolina		Hutchinson	10,005	9–6–2	20	Recap
18	November 15	Winnipeg	1–2	Nashville		Pavelec	17,113	9–7–2	20	Recap
19	November 16	Winnipeg	3–4	Minnesota	OT	Hutchinson	18,808	9–7–3	21	Recap
20	November 18	New Jersey	1–3	Winnipeg		Hutchinson	15,016	10–7–3	23	Recap
21	November 20	Detroit	4–3	Winnipeg		Pavelec	15,016	10–8–3	23	Recap
22	November 23	St. Louis	4–2	Winnipeg		Pavelec	15,016	10–9–3	23	Recap
23	November 25	Winnipeg	4–2	Columbus		Hutchinson	13,745	11–9–3	25	Recap
24	November 26	Winnipeg	2–1	Buffalo		Pavelec	18,442	12–9–3	27	Recap
25	November 28	Winnipeg	1–2	Boston	OT	Hutchinson	17,565	12–9–4	28	Recap

December: 7–3–3 (Home: 4–3–2; Road: 3–0–1)
#	Date	Visitor	Score	Home	OT	Decision	Attendance	Record	Pts	Recap
26	December 3	Edmonton	2–3	Winnipeg	OT	Pavelec	15,016	13–9–4	30	Recap
27	December 5	Colorado	2–6	Winnipeg		Hutchinson	15,016	14–9–4	32	Recap
28	December 7	Anaheim	4–3	Winnipeg	OT	Pavelec	15,016	14–9–5	33	Recap
29	December 9	Winnipeg	5–2	Dallas		Hutchinson	15,987	15–9–5	35	Recap
30	December 11	Winnipeg	3–4	Colorado	SO	Pavelec	14,300	15–9–6	36	Recap
31	December 13	Anaheim	4–1	Winnipeg		Hutchinson	15,016	15–10–6	36	Recap
32	December 16	Buffalo	1–5	Winnipeg		Pavelec	15,016	16–10–6	38	Recap
33	December 19	Boston	1–2	Winnipeg		Hutchinson	15,016	17–10–6	40	Recap
34	December 21	Philadelphia	4–3	Winnipeg	OT	Pavelec	15,016	17–10–7	41	Recap
35	December 23	Winnipeg	5–1	Chicago		Hutchinson	22,095	18–10–7	43	Recap
36	December 27	Winnipeg	4–3	Minnesota	OT	Hutchinson	19,177	19–10–7	45	Recap
37	December 29	Minnesota	3–2	Winnipeg		Hutchinson	15,016	19–11–7	45	Recap
38	December 31	NY Islanders	5–2	Winnipeg		Pavelec	15,016	19–12–7	45	Recap

January: 7–5–1 (Home: 4–2–0; Road: 3–3–1)
#	Date	Visitor	Score	Home	OT	Decision	Attendance	Record	Pts	Recap
39	January 3	Toronto	1–5	Winnipeg		Hutchinson	15,016	20–12–7	47	Recap
40	January 5	San Jose	3–2	Winnipeg		Hutchinson	15,016	20–13–7	47	Recap
41	January 8	Winnipeg	1–4	Arizona		Pavelec	11,390	20–14–7	47	Recap
42	January 10	Winnipeg	5–4	Los Angeles	SO	Hutchinson	18,230	21–14–7	49	Recap
43	January 11	Winnipeg	4–5	Anaheim	SO	Pavelec	17,356	21–14–8	50	Recap
44	January 13	Florida	2–8	Winnipeg		Hutchinson	15,016	22–14–8	52	Recap
45	January 15	Winnipeg	2–1	Dallas		Pavelec	16,221	23–14–8	54	Recap
46	January 16	Winnipeg	4–2	Chicago		Hutchinson	22,051	24–14–8	56	Recap
47	January 18	Arizona	3–4	Winnipeg	SO	Pavelec	15,016	25–14–8	58	Recap
48	January 21	Columbus	0–4	Winnipeg		Hutchinson	15,016	26–14–8	60	Recap
49	January 27	Winnipeg	3–5	Pittsburgh		Pavelec	18,627	26–15–8	60	Recap
50	January 29	Winnipeg	2–5	Philadelphia		Hutchinson	19,673	26–16–8	60	Recap
51	January 31	Dallas	5–2	Winnipeg		Hutchinson	15,016	26–17–8	60	Recap

February: 5–3–4 (Home: 4–0–2; Road: 1–3–2)
#	Date	Visitor	Score	Home	OT	Decision	Attendance	Record	Pts	Recap
52	February 2	Winnipeg	2–5	Calgary		Hutchinson	18,824	26–18–8	60	Recap
53	February 3	Winnipeg	2–3	Vancouver	OT	Pavelec	18,509	26–18–9	61	Recap
54	February 6	Chicago	2–1	Winnipeg	OT	Hutchinson	15,016	26–18–10	62	Recap
55	February 8	Colorado	3–5	Winnipeg		Pavelec	15,016	27–18–10	64	Recap
56	February 10	Minnesota	1–2	Winnipeg	OT	Hutchinson	15,016	28–18–10	66	Recap
57	February 12	Winnipeg	1–3	Nashville		Pavelec	16,135	28–19–10	66	Recap
58	February 14	Winnipeg	5–4	Detroit	SO	Hutchinson	20,027	29–19–10	68	Recap
59	February 16	Edmonton	4–5	Winnipeg	SO	Hutchinson	15,016	30–19–10	70	Recap
60	February 19	Winnipeg	1–5	Washington		Pavelec	18,506	30–20–10	70	Recap
61	February 21	Winnipeg	3–4	Toronto	OT	Hutchinson	19,359	30–20–11	71	Recap
62	February 24	Dallas	2–4	Winnipeg		Hutchinson	15,016	31–20–11	73	Recap
63	February 26	St. Louis	2–1	Winnipeg	SO	Hutchinson	15,016	31–20–12	74	Recap

March: 8–6–0 (Home: 6–3–0; Road: 2–3–0)
#	Date	Visitor	Score	Home	OT	Decision	Attendance	Record	Pts	Recap
64	March 1	Los Angeles	2–5	Winnipeg		Hutchinson	15,016	32–20–12	76	Recap
65	March 4	Ottawa	3–1	Winnipeg		Hutchinson	15,016	32–21–12	76	Recap
66	March 7	Winnipeg	3–1	Nashville		Hutchinson	17,113	33–21–12	78	Recap
67	March 10	Winnipeg	4–5	St. Louis		Pavelec	19,297	33–22–12	78	Recap
68	March 12	Winnipeg	2–4	Florida		Hutchinson	9,819	33–23–12	78	Recap
69	March 14	Winnipeg	2–1	Tampa Bay		Pavelec	19,204	34–23–12	80	Recap
70	March 17	San Jose	2–5	Winnipeg		Pavelec	15,016	35–23–12	82	Recap
71	March 19	St. Louis	1–2	Winnipeg	SO	Pavelec	15,016	36–23–12	84	Recap
72	March 21	Washington	0–3	Winnipeg		Pavelec	15,016	37–23–12	86	Recap
73	March 23	Winnipeg	4–1	Edmonton		Pavelec	16,839	38–23–12	88	Recap
74	March 24	Winnipeg	2–5	Vancouver		Hutchinson	18,870	38–24–12	88	Recap
75	March 26	Montreal	2–5	Winnipeg		Pavelec	15,016	39–24–12	90	Recap
76	March 29	Chicago	4–3	Winnipeg		Pavelec	15,016	39–25–12	90	Recap
77	March 31	NY Rangers	3–2	Winnipeg		Pavelec	15,016	39–26–12	90	Recap

April: 4–0–1 (Home: 2–0–0; Road: 2–0–1)
#	Date	Visitor	Score	Home	OT	Decision	Attendance	Record	Pts	Recap
78	April 4	Vancouver	4–5	Winnipeg		Pavelec	15,016	40–26–12	92	Recap
79	April 6	Winnipeg	2–0	Minnesota		Pavelec	19,010	41–26–12	94	Recap
80	April 7	Winnipeg	1–0	St. Louis		Pavelec	19,616	42–26–12	96	Recap
81	April 9	Winnipeg	0–1	Colorado	SO	Pavelec	14,802	42–26–13	97	Recap
82	April 11	Calgary	1–5	Winnipeg		Hutchinson	15,016	43–26–13	99	Recap

Legend: Win (2 points) Loss (0 points) Overtime/shootout loss (1 point)

=== Playoffs ===
2015 Stanley Cup Playoffs

Western Conference First Round vs. (P1) Anaheim Ducks: Ducks win series 4–0
#	Date	Visitor	Score	Home	OT	Decision	Attendance	Series	Recap
1	April 16	Winnipeg	2–4	Anaheim		Pavelec	17,174	0–1	Recap
2	April 18	Winnipeg	1–2	Anaheim		Pavelec	17,415	0–2	Recap
3	April 20	Anaheim	5–4	Winnipeg	OT	Pavelec	15,016	0–3	Recap
4	April 22	Anaheim	5–2	Winnipeg		Pavelec	15,016	0–4	Recap

Legend: Win Loss

== Player statistics ==
Final Stats

Skaters

Regular season
Player	GP	G	A	Pts	+/−	PIM
Andrew Ladd	81	24	38	62	9	72
Blake Wheeler	79	26	35	61	26	73
Bryan Little	70	24	28	52	8	24
Mark Scheifele	82	15	34	49	11	24
Dustin Byfuglien	69	18	27	45	5	124
Michael Frolik	82	19	23	42	4	18
Mathieu Perreault	62	18	23	41	7	38
Adam Lowry	80	11	12	23	1	46
Tobias Enstrom	60	4	19	23	13	36
Evander Kane^{‡}	37	10	12	22	−1	56
Jacob Trouba	65	7	15	22	2	46
Drew Stafford^{†}	26	9	10	19	6	8
Tyler Myers^{†}	24	3	12	15	9	16
Chris Thorburn	81	7	7	14	−5	76
Mark Stuart	70	2	12	14	5	69
Jim Slater	82	5	8	13	−4	58
Zach Bogosian^{‡}	41	3	10	13	1	40
Lee Stempniak^{†}	18	6	4	10	1	2
Adam Pardy	55	0	9	9	9	40
Matthew Halischuk	47	3	5	8	5	6
Ben Chiarot	40	2	6	8	5	22
Jiri Tlusty^{†}	20	1	7	8	−1	4
Paul Postma	42	2	4	6	1	16
Jay Harrison^{†}	35	2	3	5	4	23
Grant Clitsome	24	0	4	4	4	8
Anthony Peluso	49	1	1	2	−3	86
TJ Galiardi	38	1	0	1	−8	2
Keaton Ellerby	1	0	1	1	−1	0
Eric O'Dell	11	0	1	1	0	19
Andrew Copp	1	0	1	1	2	0
Patrice Cormier	1	0	0	0	0	0
Julien Brouillette	1	0	0	0	0	0
Carl Klingberg^{‡}	2	0	0	0	−1	0

Playoffs
Player	GP	G	A	Pts	+/−	PIM
Bryan Little	4	2	1	3	−3	0
Adam Lowry	4	1	2	3	0	2
Mark Stuart	4	1	1	2	1	2
Drew Stafford	4	1	1	2	−1	0
Mathieu Perreault	3	0	2	2	−2	0
Jacob Trouba	4	0	2	2	−1	2
Lee Stempniak	4	1	0	1	2	0
Blake Wheeler	4	1	0	1	−3	2
Adam Pardy	2	1	0	1	−1	2
Tyler Myers	4	1	0	1	−2	2
Tobias Enstrom	4	0	1	1	−3	0
Dustin Byfuglien	4	0	1	1	−4	4
Andrew Ladd	4	0	1	1	−3	4
Mark Scheifele	4	0	1	1	−2	4
Chris Thorburn	4	0	0	0	0	0
Jim Slater	4	0	0	0	−1	0
Jiri Tlusty	4	0	0	0	−2	0
Michael Frolik	4	0	0	0	−2	2
Matthew Halischuk	1	0	0	0	−1	0
Ben Chiarot	2	0	0	0	−2	2

Goaltenders

Regular season
Player	GP	GS	TOI	W	L	OT	GA	GAA	SA	SV%	SO	G	A	PIM
Ondrej Pavelec	50	46	2,838	22	16	8	108	2.28	1353	.920	5	0	0	2
Michael Hutchinson	38	36	2,138	21	10	5	85	2.39	986	.914	2	0	0	0

Playoffs
Player	GP	GS	TOI	W	L	GA	GAA	SA	SV%	SO	G	A	PIM
Ondrej Pavelec	4	4	241	0	4	15	3.73	137	.891	0	0	0	0

^{†}Denotes player spent time with another team before joining the Jets. Stats reflect time with the Jets only.
^{‡}Traded mid-season. Stats reflect time with the Jets only.
Bold/italics denotes franchise record

== Notable achievements ==
=== Awards ===
Regular season
Player	Award	Awarded
D. Byfuglien	NHL All-Star game selection	January 10, 2015
D. Byfuglien	NHL First Star of the Week	January 19, 2015
O. Pavelec	NHL First Star of the Week	March 23, 2015
O. Pavelec	NHL Second Star of the Week	April 13, 2015

=== Milestones ===
Regular season
Player	Milestone	Reached
A. Lowry	1st Career NHL Game	October 9, 2014
D. Byfuglien	300th Career NHL Point	October 9, 2014
M. Stuart	500th Career NHL Game	October 12, 2014
A. Lowry	1st Career NHL Goal; 1st Career NHL Point	October 21, 2014
A. Ladd	200th Career NHL Assist	October 26, 2014
B. Little	300th Career NHL Point	October 26, 2014
M. Hutchinson	1st Career NHL Shutout	November 2, 2014
O. Pavelec	300th Career NHL Game	November 4, 2014
B. Little	500th Career NHL Game	November 6, 2014
E. Kane	100th Career NHL Goal	November 6, 2014
T. Enstrom	500th Career NHL Game	November 11, 2014
T. Galiardi	300th Career NHL Game	November 13, 2014
M. Frolik	200th Career NHL Point	November 18, 2014
A. Lowry	1st Career NHL Assist	November 18, 2014
M. Scheifele	100th Career NHL Game	December 3, 2014
B. Chiarot	1st Career NHL Assist; 1st Career NHL Point	December 5, 2014
G. Clitsome	200th Career NHL Game	December 21, 2014
C. Thorburn	100th Career NHL Point	December 23, 2014
B. Chiarot	1st career NHL Goal	January 3, 2015
B. Wheeler	200th Career NHL Assist	January 10, 2015
D. Byfuglien	200th Career NHL Assist	January 11, 2015
B. Wheeler	500th Career NHL Game	January 16, 2015
J. Trouba	100th Career NHL Game	January 31, 2015
A. Ladd	400th Career NHL Point	January 31, 2015
A. Peluso	100th Career NHL Game	February 24, 2015

Playoffs
Player	Milestone	Reached
B. Little	1st Career Playoff Game	April 16, 2015
M. Scheifele	1st Career Playoff Game	April 16, 2015
O. Pavelec	1st Career Playoff Game	April 16, 2015
A. Lowry	1st Career Playoff Game; 1st Career Playoff Goal; 1st Career Playoff Point	April 16, 2015
T. Enstrom	1st Career Playoff Game	April 16, 2015
J. Trouba	1st Career Playoff Game; 1st Career Playoff Assist; 1st Career Playoff Point	April 16, 2015
C. Thorburn	1st Career Playoff Game	April 16, 2015
J. Tlusty	1st Career Playoff Game	April 16, 2015
B. Chiarot	1st Career Playoff Game	April 16, 2015
A. Pardy	1st Career Playoff Goal	April 18, 2015
M. Scheifele	1st Career Playoff Assist; 1st Career Playoff Point	April 18, 2015
A. Lowry	1st Career Playoff Assist	April 18, 2015
T. Enstrom	1st Career Playoff Assist; 1st Career Playoff Point	April 20, 2015
B. Little	1st Career Playoff Goal; 1st Career Playoff Point	April 20, 2015
M. Stuart	1st Career Playoff Goal	April 22, 2015

== Transactions ==
Winnipeg has been involved in the following transactions during the 2014–15 season.

=== Trades ===
Date	Details
June 28, 2014	To Washington Capitals Edward Pasquale; 6th-round pick in 2014	To Winnipeg Jets 6th-round pick in 2014; NSH's 7th-round pick in 2014; 7th-round pick in 2015
June 28, 2014	To Ottawa Senators 7th-round pick in 2014	To Winnipeg Jets 6th-round pick in 2015
July 9, 2014	To Buffalo Sabres Jordan Samuels-Thomas	To Winnipeg Jets Conditional 7th-round pick in 2015
October 5, 2014	To Montreal Canadiens Eric Tangradi	To Winnipeg Jets Peter Budaj; Patrick Holland
December 18, 2014	To Carolina Hurricanes 6th-round pick in 2015	To Winnipeg Jets Jay Harrison
February 11, 2015	To Buffalo Sabres Evander Kane; Zach Bogosian; Jason Kasdorf	To Winnipeg Jets Tyler Myers; Drew Stafford; Brendan Lemieux; Joel Armia; 1st-round pick in 2015
February 25, 2015	To Carolina Hurricanes Conditional 5th-round or 6th-round pick in 2015; 3rd-round pick in 2016	To Winnipeg Jets Jiri Tlusty
March 1, 2015	To New York Rangers Carl Klingberg	To Winnipeg Jets Lee Stempniak

=== Free agents acquired ===
Date	Player	Former team	Contract terms (in U.S. dollars)	Ref
July 1, 2014	Mathieu Perreault	Anaheim Ducks	3 years, $9 million	
August 1, 2014	TJ Galiardi	Calgary Flames	1 year, $750,000	
August 8, 2014	Julien Brouillette	Washington Capitals	1 year, $600,000	

=== Free agents lost ===
Date	Player	New team	Contract terms (in U.S. dollars)	Ref
July 1, 2014	Al Montoya	Florida Panthers	2 years, $2.1 million	
July 1, 2014	Zach Redmond	Colorado Avalanche	2 years, $1.5 million	
July 1, 2014	Olli Jokinen	Nashville Predators	1 year, $2.5 million	
July 1, 2014	Andrew Gordon	Philadelphia Flyers	1 year, $550,000	
July 10, 2014	Jerome Samson	Tampa Bay Lightning	1 year, $650,000	
August 23, 2014	Devin Setoguchi	Calgary Flames	1 year, $750,000	

=== Claimed via waivers ===
Player	Former team	Date claimed off waivers

=== Lost via waivers ===
Player	New team	Date claimed off waivers

=== Lost via retirement ===
Player

=== Player signings ===
Date	Player	Contract terms (in U.S. dollars)	Ref
June 30, 2014	Adam Pardy	1 year, $700,000	
June 30, 2014	Chris Thorburn	3 years, $3.6 million	
July 2, 2014	Michael Hutchinson	2 years, $1.15 million	
July 2, 2014	Will O'Neill	1 year, $575,000	
July 16, 2014	Carl Klingberg	1 year, $650,000	
July 19, 2014	Eric O'Dell	1 year, $650,000	
July 19, 2014	Patrice Cormier	1 year, $625,000	
July 19, 2014	John Albert	1 year, $585,000	
July 23, 2014	Ben Chiarot	1 year, $600,000	
July 24, 2014	Keaton Ellerby	1 year, $700,000	
July 29, 2014	Michael Frolik	1 year, $3.3 million	
July 30, 2014	Matthew Halischuk	1 year, $725,000	
September 2, 2014	Nikolaj Ehlers	3 years, $4.875 million entry-level contract	
March 19, 2015	Jan Kostalek	3 years, $2.55 million entry-level contract	
March 20, 2015	Jimmy Lodge	3 years, $2.415 million entry-level contract	
March 26, 2015	Andrew Copp	3 years, $2.875 million entry-level contract	
June 11, 2015	Chase De Leo	3 years, $2.625 million entry-level contract	
June 17, 2015	Anthony Peluso	2 years, $1.35 million	
June 18, 2015	Ben Chiarot	2 years, $1.7 million	

=== Suspensions/fines ===
Player	Explanation	Length	Salary	Date issued
Adam Lowry	Boarding Buffalo Sabres forward Patrick Kaleta during NHL Game No. 323 in Buffalo on Wednesday, November 26, 2014, at 14:06 of the second period.	1 game	$4,453.41	November 28, 2014
Evander Kane	Boarding Anaheim Ducks defenseman Clayton Stoner during NHL Game No. 402 in Winnipeg on Sunday, December 7, 2014, at 19:49 of the second period.	2 games	$56,451.62	December 8, 2014
Dustin Byfuglien	Cross-checking New York Rangers forward J. T. Miller during NHL Game No. 1148 in Winnipeg on Tuesday, March 31, 2015, at 17:20 of the second period.	4 games	$111,827.96	April 2, 2015

== Draft picks ==
The 2014 NHL entry draft will be held on June 27–28, 2014 at the Wells Fargo Center in Philadelphia, Pennsylvania.

Round	#	Player	Pos	Nationality	College/Junior/Club team (League)
1	9	Nikolaj Ehlers	Left wing	Denmark	Halifax Mooseheads (QMJHL)
3	69	Jack Glover	Defense	United States	US NTDP (USHL)
4	99	Chase De Leo	Centre	United States	Portland Winterhawks (WHL)
4	101^{[a]}	Nelson Nogier	Defense	Canada	Saskatoon Blades (WHL)
5	129	Clinston Franklin	Forward	United States	Sioux Falls Stampede (USHL)
6	164 ^{[b]}	Pavel Kraskovsky	Centre	Russia	Lokomotiv Yaroslavl (KHL)
7	192 ^{[b]}	Matt Ustaski	Forward	United States	Langley Rivermen (BCHL)

Draft notes

- Winnipeg's second-round pick will go to the Buffalo Sabres, as the result of a trade on March 5, 2014, that sent Matt Moulson and Cody McCormick to Minnesota, in exchange for Torrey Mitchell, a second-round pick in 2016 and this pick.
- ^{a} New Jersey's fourth-round pick will go to Winnipeg, as the result of a trade on February 13, 2013, that sent Alexei Ponikarovsky to New Jersey, in exchange for a seventh-round pick in 2013, and this pick.
- ^{b} Winnipeg's' sixth-round pick went to the Washington Capitals as the result of a trade on June 28, 2014, that sent a sixth-round pick in 2014 (164th overall), Nashville's seventh-round pick in 2014 (192nd overall) and a seventh-round pick in 2015 to Winnipeg in exchange for Edward Pasquale and this pick.
- Winnipeg's seventh-round (189th overall) pick went to the Ottawa Senators, on June 28, 2014, in exchange for a sixth-round pick in 2015.
