= Michael Kostka =

Canadian ice hockey player (born 1985)

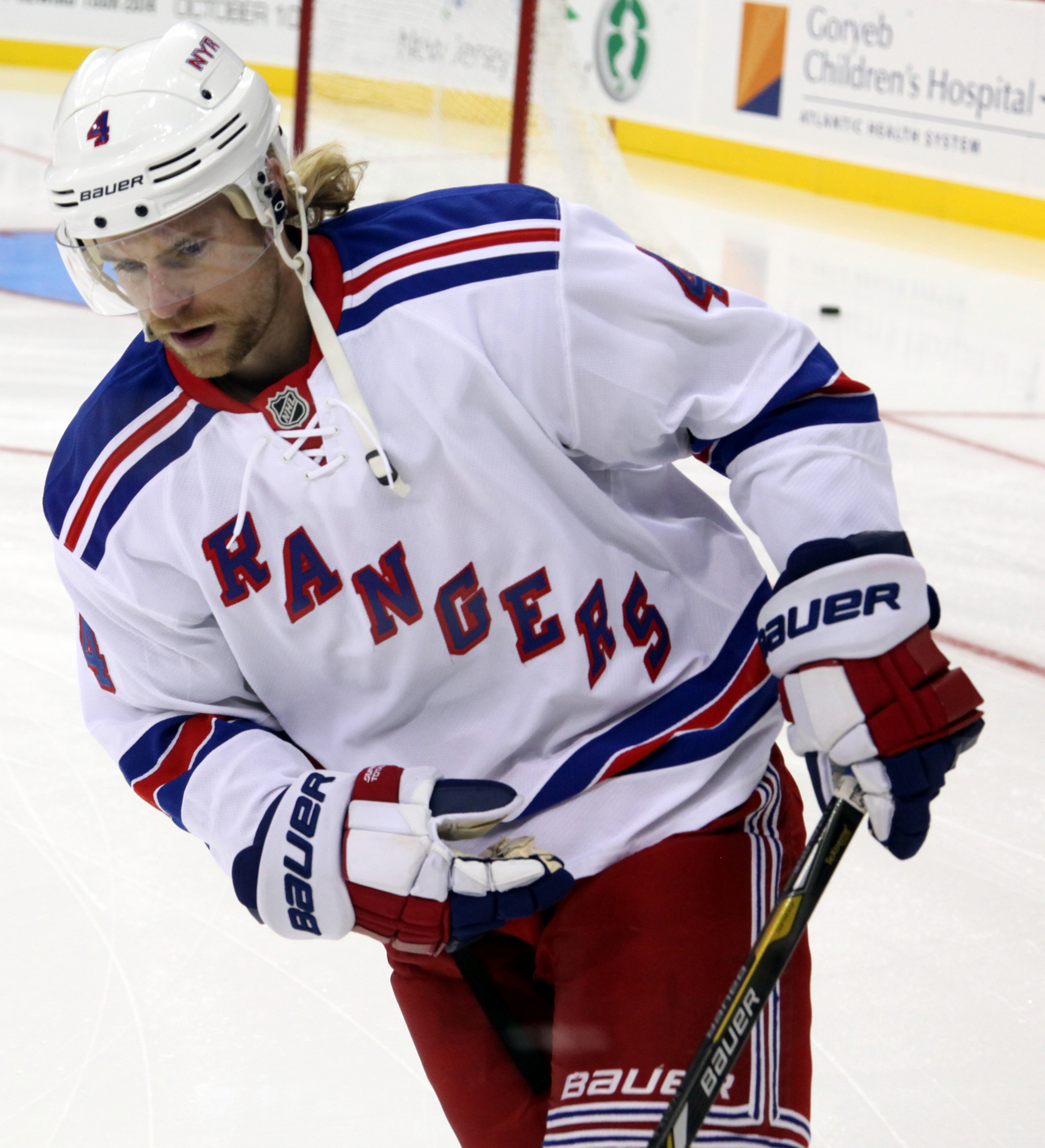
- Kostka with the New York Rangers in 2014
- Born: November 28, 1985 (age 40) Ajax, Ontario, Canada
- Height: 6 ft 2 in (188 cm)
- Weight: 210 lb (95 kg; 15 st 0 lb)
- Position: Defence
- Shot: Right
- Played for: Toronto Maple Leafs; Chicago Blackhawks; Tampa Bay Lightning; New York Rangers; Ottawa Senators; Skellefteå AIK
- NHL draft: Undrafted
- Playing career: 2008–2018

Michael Christopher Kostka (born November 28, 1985) is a Canadian former professional ice hockey defenceman who played in the National Hockey League (NHL).

== Playing career ==
After playing four seasons at the University of Massachusetts Amherst, he was signed to a professional contract by the Buffalo Sabres of the National Hockey League on March 25, 2008. He was assigned to the organization's American Hockey League (AHL) affiliate (at the time), the Rochester Americans. In his second professional season he moved with the Sabres to their new AHL affiliate, the Portland Pirates.

Kostka returned to the Rochester Americans, now the Florida Panther affiliate for the 2010–11 season on August 24, 2010. On June 30, 2011, Kostka signed a two-way contract with the Florida Panthers and was assigned again to the Americans. On December 2, 2011, Kostka was traded by the Panthers, along with Evan Oberg, to the Tampa Bay Lightning for James Wright and Mike Vernace. Kostka joined the Lightning's AHL affiliate, the Norfolk Admirals and was a part of their Calder Cup championship.

On July 1, 2012, Kostka was signed as a free agent to a one-year contract with the Toronto Maple Leafs. Kostka got his first NHL point in his debut NHL game against the Montreal Canadiens on January 19, 2013. Kostka split the season with the Maple Leafs and their AHL affiliate, the Toronto Marlies.

On July 19, 2013, Kostka signed as a free agent to a one-year, two way contract with the defending Stanley Cup champions, the Chicago Blackhawks. He then scored his first NHL goal against the Leafs on October 19, 2013, against Jonathan Bernier. After only nine games with the Blackhawks and approaching the last quarter of the season, on February 23, 2014, Kostka was claimed off waivers by the Tampa Bay Lightning. Kostka finished the season with the Lightning.

Kostka left as a free agent to sign a one-year contract with the New York Rangers on July 1, 2014. He spent most of the season with the Rangers' AHL affiliate Hartford Wolf Pack.

On July 1, 2015, Kostka signed a one-year, two-way contract with the Ottawa Senators. Kostka was assigned to the Senators' AHL affiliate Binghamton Senators. Kostka made his Ottawa debut on March 6, 2016.

In the 2016–17 season, while in his second season with the Binghamton Senators, Kostka was included in a trade deadline deal by the Senators along with Curtis Lazar to the Calgary Flames in exchange for Jyrki Jokipakka and a conditional second-round pick in 2017.

As a free agent in the off-season, Kostka opted to sign his first professional contract abroad in agreeing to a try-out with Swedish top tier club, Skellefteå AIK of the SHL on September 1, 2017.

== Career statistics ==
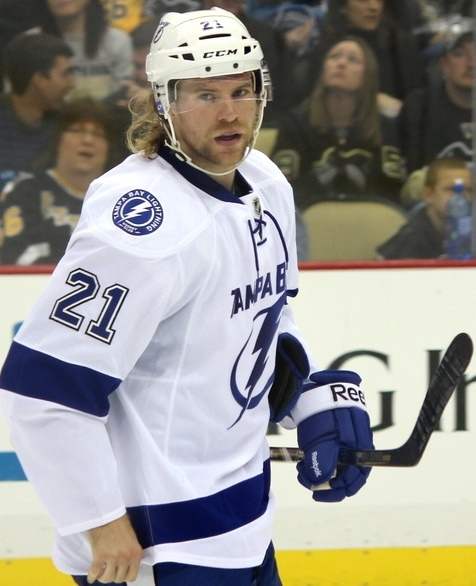
Kostka in 2014 with the Lightning.

			Regular season					Playoffs
Season	Team	League	GP	G	A	Pts	PIM	GP	G	A	Pts	PIM
2000–01	Ajax-Pickering Raiders	OMHA-ETA	39	5	13	18	28	—	—	—	—	—
2001–02	Ajax-Pickering Raiders	OMHA-ETA	23	6	11	17	38	—	—	—	—	—
2001–02	Ajax Axemen	OPJHL	19	1	4	5	8	—	—	—	—	—
2002–03	Ajax Axemen	OPJHL	39	4	11	15	32	—	—	—	—	—
2003–04	Aurora Tigers	OPJHL	42	9	27	36	4	—	—	—	—	—
2004–05	U. of Massachusetts-Amherst	HE	32	1	5	6	14	—	—	—	—	—
2005–06	U. of Massachusetts-Amherst	HE	36	2	6	8	20	—	—	—	—	—
2006–07	U. of Massachusetts-Amherst	HE	39	3	15	18	20	—	—	—	—	—
2007–08	U. of Massachusetts-Amherst	HE	36	9	12	21	20	—	—	—	—	—
2007–08	Rochester Americans	AHL	1	0	0	0	2	—	—	—	—	—
2008–09	Portland Pirates	AHL	80	4	26	30	33	4	1	0	1	6
2009–10	Portland Pirates	AHL	76	2	25	27	37	4	0	0	0	0
2010–11	Rochester Americans	AHL	80	16	39	55	46	—	—	—	—	—
2011–12	San Antonio Rampage	AHL	18	2	4	6	14	—	—	—	—	—
2011–12	Norfolk Admirals	AHL	52	7	25	32	43	18	6	6	12	8
2012–13	Toronto Marlies	AHL	34	6	28	34	38	—	—	—	—	—
2012–13	Toronto Maple Leafs	NHL	35	0	8	8	27	1	0	0	0	0
2013–14	Chicago Blackhawks	NHL	9	2	1	3	8	—	—	—	—	—
2013–14	Rockford IceHogs	AHL	2	0	1	1	2	—	—	—	—	—
2013–14	Tampa Bay Lightning	NHL	19	2	6	8	0	3	0	2	2	0
2014–15	Hartford Wolf Pack	AHL	63	5	25	30	35	15	1	4	5	6
2014–15	New York Rangers	NHL	7	0	1	1	0	—	—	—	—	—
2015–16	Binghamton Senators	AHL	50	5	24	29	20	—	—	—	—	—
2015–16	Ottawa Senators	NHL	15	0	1	1	4	—	—	—	—	—
2016–17	Binghamton Senators	AHL	46	1	11	12	32	—	—	—	—	—
2016–17	Stockton Heat	AHL	15	2	10	12	4	5	1	2	3	6
2017–18	Skellefteå AIK	SHL	50	4	13	17	38	16	1	3	4	6
NHL totals			85	4	17	21	39	4	0	2	2	0

== Awards and honors ==
Award	Year
College
All-Hockey East Second Team	2007–08
AHL
Calder Cup (Norfolk Admirals)	2012
All-Star Game	2016
