= B. J. Crombeen =

American-born Canadian ice hockey player

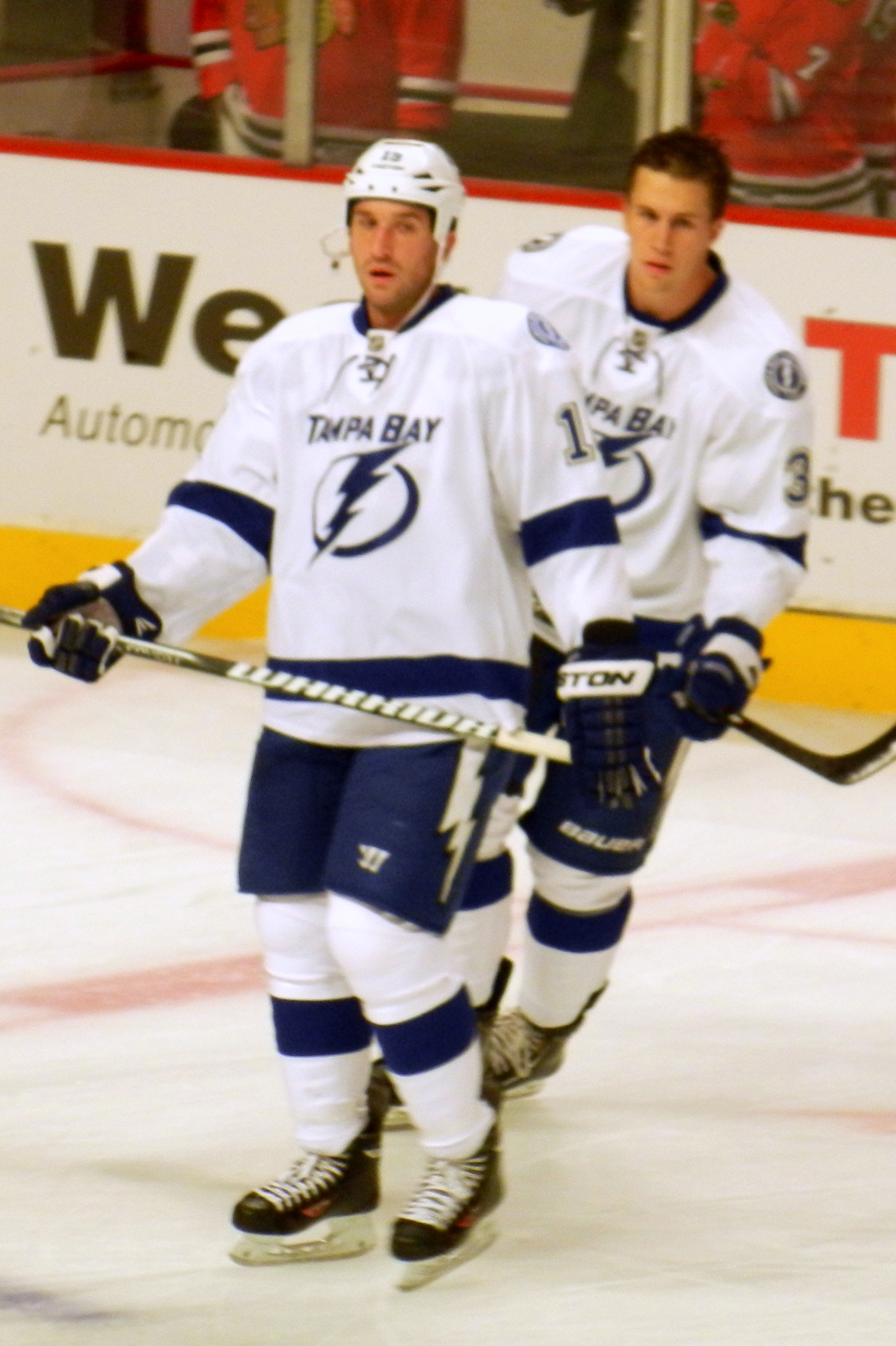
- Crombeen (front) with the Tampa Bay Lightning in 2013
- Born: July 10, 1985 (age 41) Denver, Colorado, U.S.
- Height: 6 ft 2 in (188 cm)
- Weight: 210 lb (95 kg; 15 st 0 lb)
- Position: Right wing
- Shot: Right
- Played for: Porin Ässät; Dallas Stars; St. Louis Blues; Tampa Bay Lightning; Arizona Coyotes
- NHL draft: 54th overall, 2003; Dallas Stars
- Playing career: 2005–2015

Brandon James Crombeen (born July 10, 1985) is an American-born Canadian former professional ice hockey right winger who last played for the Arizona Coyotes of the National Hockey League (NHL). He has also played in the NHL for the Dallas Stars, St. Louis Blues and Tampa Bay Lightning, drafted by the former in the second round, 54th overall, in 2003.

== Playing career ==
=== Junior ===
Crombeen started his junior hockey career with the OPJHL's Newmarket Hurricane 87's in the 2000–01 season. He then spent four seasons with the Ontario Hockey League (OHL)'s Barrie Colts. He had 170 points in 248 regular season games and 21 points in 44 playoff games for Barrie, also recording over 100 penalty minutes in each season.

=== Professional ===
Crombeen was drafted by the Dallas Stars in the second round, 54th overall, of the 2003 NHL entry draft. In July 2005, he signed a three-year, entry-level contract with the Stars. He split the 2005–06 season with the American Hockey League (AHL)'s Iowa Stars and the ECHL's Idaho Steelheads, totaling 20 points in 60 regular season games. In August 2006, he signed with Ässät of SM-liiga. In 55 games, he had 22 points and 152 penalty minutes. He also played 13 regular season games and 22 playoff games for Idaho in 2006–07 and helped the team win the ECHL championship.

Crombeen spent most of the 2007–08 season with the Iowa Stars, but was later recalled to the Dallas Stars in January and made his NHL debut. He played eight regular season games and five Stanley Cup playoff games for Dallas. In July 2008, he re-signed with the team as a restricted free agent. Crombeen played 15 games for Dallas early in the season, but in November, he was claimed off waivers by the St. Louis Blues. He finished the 2008–09 season with St. Louis, playing in 66 games and scoring 17 points.

Crombeen re-signed with the Blues as a restricted free agent in July 2009. During the 2009–10 season, he played in 79 games. He had 15 points and a career-high 168 penalty minutes. In 2010–11, he played in 80 games, totaling 14 points and 154 penalty minutes. He led the team in penalty minutes that season.

In June 2011, Crombeen signed a two-year contract extension with St. Louis. He suffered a broken left shoulder blade, however, in the Blues' final pre-season game in October. He finished the season with three points and 71 penalty minutes in 40 games. After the first year of his extension, St. Louis traded Crombeen and a fifth-round draft pick in 2014 to the Tampa Bay Lightning in exchange for fourth-round picks in both 2013 and 2014.

Due to the 2012–13 NHL lockout, Crombeen signed a contract with the Orlando Solar Bears of the ECHL on November 16, 2012. He played 44 games for the Lightning that season, totaling eight points and 112 penalty minutes. On March 5, 2013, Crombeen scored his first goal as a member of the Lightning in a 5–2 victory over the New Jersey Devils. On April 1, 2013, Tampa Bay announced the re-signing of Crombeen to a two-year contract extension. He skated 30 games that season, recording a goal and seven points to go along with 86 penalty minutes and a +6 plus-minus rating. Crombeen finished first on the Lightning and fifth in the NHL in penalty minutes accumulated for the 2012–13 season.

On June 29, 2014, the Arizona Coyotes acquired Crombeen and Sam Gagner from the Lightning in exchange for a sixth-round pick in the 2015 NHL entry draft. On October 28, 2014, Crombeen scored his first goal as a member of the Coyotes in a 7–3 loss to Tampa Bay. On November 14, Crombeen played in his 400th career NHL game in Arizona's 5–0 shutout victory over the Vancouver Canucks.

Crombeen retired in 2015 and took up a career in finance.

== Personal life ==
Despite being born in Denver, Colorado, Crombeen was raised in Bright's Grove, Ontario.

Crombeen was diagnosed at the age of nine with type 1 diabetes, one of the few athletes in professional sports with the condition. His father, Mike Crombeen, played five seasons for the Barons, Blues, and Whalers from 1977 to 1985.

== Career statistics ==
=== Regular season and playoffs ===
			Regular season					Playoffs
Season	Team	League	GP	G	A	Pts	PIM	GP	G	A	Pts	PIM
2000–01	Newmarket Hurricanes	OPJHL	35	14	13	27	53	—	—	—	—	—
2001–02	Barrie Colts	OHL	60	12	13	25	118	20	1	1	2	31
2002–03	Barrie Colts	OHL	63	22	24	46	133	6	1	0	1	8
2003–04	Barrie Colts	OHL	62	21	29	50	154	12	5	7	12	35
2004–05	Barrie Colts	OHL	63	31	18	49	111	6	2	4	6	35
2005–06	Iowa Stars	AHL	52	5	7	12	97	5	1	0	1	9
2005–06	Idaho Steelheads	ECHL	8	5	3	8	5	—	—	—	—	—
2006–07	Ässät	SM-l	55	13	9	22	152	—	—	—	—	—
2006–07	Idaho Steelheads	ECHL	13	7	4	11	43	22	5	5	10	45
2007–08	Iowa Stars	AHL	65	14	14	28	158	—	—	—	—	—
2007–08	Dallas Stars	NHL	8	0	2	2	39	5	0	0	0	0
2008–09	Dallas Stars	NHL	15	1	4	5	26	—	—	—	—	—
2008–09	St. Louis Blues	NHL	66	11	6	17	122	4	0	0	0	12
2009–10	St. Louis Blues	NHL	79	7	8	15	168	—	—	—	—	—
2010–11	St. Louis Blues	NHL	80	7	7	14	154	—	—	—	—	—
2011–12	St. Louis Blues	NHL	40	1	2	3	71	7	1	0	1	31
2012–13	Orlando Solar Bears	ECHL	2	0	0	0	2	—	—	—	—	—
2012–13	Tampa Bay Lightning	NHL	44	1	7	8	112	—	—	—	—	—
2013–14	Tampa Bay Lightning	NHL	55	3	7	10	79	2	0	0	0	0
2014–15	Arizona Coyotes	NHL	58	3	3	6	79	—	—	—	—	—
NHL totals			445	34	46	80	850	18	1	0	1	43

=== International ===
Year	Team	Event	GP	G	A	Pts	PIM
2003	Canada	WJC18	7	1	4	5	4
Junior totals			7	1	4	5	4
