= 2014–15 Toronto Maple Leafs season =

NHL hockey team season

2014–15 Toronto Maple Leafs
- Division: 7th Atlantic
- Conference: 15th Eastern
- 2014–15 record: 30–44–8
- Home record: 22–17–2
- Road record: 8–27–6
- Goals for: 211
- Goals against: 262

Team information
- General manager: Dave Nonis
- Coach: Randy Carlyle (Oct.–Jan.); Peter Horachek (interim, Jan.–Apr.)
- Captain: Dion Phaneuf
- Alternate captains: Joffrey Lupul; Stephane Robidas (Note: During injuries to these players, alternate captaincy was handed to one of Tyler Bozak, David Clarkson, and Roman Polak, with each having served at least once.)
- Arena: Air Canada Centre
- Average attendance: 19,076 (94.1%) (36 games)

Team leaders
- Goals: James van Riemsdyk (27)
- Assists: Phil Kessel (36)
- Points: Phil Kessel (61)
- Penalty minutes: Dion Phaneuf (108)
- Plus/minus: Daniel Winnik (+14)
- Wins: Jonathan Bernier (21)
- Goals against average: Jonathan Bernier (2.87)

The 2014–15 Toronto Maple Leafs season was the 98th season for the National Hockey League (NHL) franchise that was established on November 22, 1917. This was the second year of the new alignment and schedule format. Toronto again played every team in their own division at least four times, every team in the Metropolitan Division of the Eastern Conference three times, and every team from the Western Conference twice. To complete the 82-game schedule, they played both Ottawa and Detroit five times. Notable in this season was a series of Maple Leafs jerseys being tossed onto the ice at the Air Canada Centre by some fans upset with the team's poor performance, which at times was met with arrests and ejections from the building.

On March 23, 2015, a 13-year long sellout streak ended; only 18,336 fans showed up for the evening match against the Minnesota Wild. Ticket prices for the game were reduced earlier in the day.

Despite remaining in the playoff hunt for the first half of the season, the Leafs finished the season with only 68 points, tied for the fewest earned since the NHL began playing 82 games per season in the 1995–96 season. The team would miss the playoffs for the second year in a row for the first time since the 2010–11 and 2011–12 seasons. The day after the regular season ended, April 12, 2015, Maple Leafs president Brendan Shanahan kept good on his promise of a scorched earth rebuild, as general manager Dave Nonis and interim head coach Peter Horachek were terminated from their positions. Also terminated were coaches Steve Spott, Chris Dennis and Rick St. Croix; director of player development Jim Hughes and director of pro scouting Steve Kasper, as well as Rob Cowie and 18 other scouts. Later in the day, strength and conditioning coach Anthony Belza was fired.

On May 20, 2015, the Toronto Maple Leafs announced that Mike Babcock would be the team's new head coach, signing him to an eight-year, $50 million contract.

== Off-season ==
On May 8, 2014, general manager Dave Nonis announced that Randy Carlyle had accepted a contract extension to continue as head coach through the 2016–17 season, however Carlyle's assistant coaches, Greg Cronin, Scott Gordon and Dave Farrish were all released by the team.

On July 22, 2014, Brendan Shanahan let go former assistant general managers Claude Loiselle and Dave Poulin and named Kyle Dubas as the new assistant general manager. At the time of the hire, Dubas was 28 years old. He was formerly the general manager of the Ontario Hockey League's Sault Ste. Marie Greyhounds.

Many players were signed, lost and traded during free agency. See Transactions for a list of lost and acquired players.

== Standings ==
Atlantic Division
Pos	Team	GP	W	L	OTL	ROW	GF	GA	GD	Pts
1	y – Montreal Canadiens	82	50	22	10	43	221	189	+32	110
2	x – Tampa Bay Lightning	82	50	24	8	47	262	211	+51	108
3	x – Detroit Red Wings	82	43	25	14	39	235	221	+14	100
4	x – Ottawa Senators	82	43	26	13	37	238	215	+23	99
5	Boston Bruins	82	41	27	14	37	213	211	+2	96
6	Florida Panthers	82	38	29	15	30	206	223	−17	91
7	Toronto Maple Leafs	82	30	44	8	25	211	262	−51	68
8	Buffalo Sabres	82	23	51	8	15	161	274	−113	54

Source: National Hockey League
x – Clinched playoff spot; y – Clinched division

Eastern Conference Wild Card
Pos	Div	Team	GP	W	L	OTL	ROW	GF	GA	GD	Pts
1	AT	x – Ottawa Senators	82	43	26	13	37	238	215	+23	99
2	ME	x – Pittsburgh Penguins	82	43	27	12	39	221	210	+11	98
3	AT	Boston Bruins	82	41	27	14	37	213	211	+2	96
4	AT	Florida Panthers	82	38	29	15	30	206	223	−17	91
5	ME	Columbus Blue Jackets	82	42	35	5	33	236	250	−14	89
6	ME	Philadelphia Flyers	82	33	31	18	30	215	234	−19	84
7	ME	New Jersey Devils	82	32	36	14	27	181	216	−35	78
8	ME	Carolina Hurricanes	82	30	41	11	25	188	226	−38	71
9	AT	Toronto Maple Leafs	82	30	44	8	25	211	262	−51	68
10	AT	Buffalo Sabres	82	23	51	8	15	161	274	−113	54

Source: National Hockey League
x – Clinched playoff spot

== Record vs opponents ==
Eastern Conference												Western Conference					
Atlantic Division							Metropolitan Division					Central Division			Pacific Division		
Team	Home			Away			Team	Home		Away		Team	Home	Away	Team	Home	Away
Boston	1–4	6–1		4–3*	1–2*		Carolina	1–4		1–4	1–2	Chicago	3–2	0–4	Anaheim	6–2	0–4
Buffalo	4–0	4–3*		2–6	3–4		Columbus	5–2		4–1	0–5	Colorado	3–2*	3–4*	Arizona	1–3	2–3
Detroit	1–4	4–1	4–1	0–1*	2–1*		New Jersey	3–5		1–2*	1–4	Dallas	5–3	4–0	Calgary	4–1	3–6
Florida	2–3	1–4		4–6	3–2		N.Y. Islanders	3–4*		5–2	2–3	Minnesota	1–2	1–3	Edmonton	5–1	1–4
Montreal	3–4	3–4*		1–2*	0–4		N.Y. Rangers	5–4	4–5	6–3		Nashville	2–9	3–4	Los Angeles	4–3*	0–2
Ottawa	4–3*	3–2*		5–3	3–4	3–5	Philadelphia	4–7	3–2	0–1		St. Louis	1–6	0–3	San Jose	1–4	1–3
Tampa Bay	5–2	3–1		2–3	2–4		Pittsburgh	2–5	1–2	3–4*		Winnipeg	4–3*	1–5	Vancouver	5–2	1–4
							Washington	6–2	2–6	0–4							
Records	9–5–1			4–8–3				4–7–1		3–7–2			4–3–0	1–5–1		5–2–0	0–7–0
Division	13–13–4							7–14–3					5–8–1			5–9–0	
Conference	20–27–7 (Home: 13–12–2; Away: 7–15–5)												10–17–1 (Home: 9–5–0; Away: 1–12–1)				
Overall	30–44–8 (Home: 22–17–2; Away: 8–27–6)																

(* game decided in overtime or shoot-out)

== Suspensions/fines ==
Player	Explanation	Length	Salary	Date issued
Carter Ashton	Violating the terms of the NHL/NHL Players' Association Performance Enhancing Substances Program.	20 games	$169,185.00	November 6, 2014
Richard Panik	Diving/Embellishment during NHL Game No. 939 in Washington on Sunday, March 1, 2015, at 10:57 of the second period.	—	$2,000.00	March 5, 2015
Nazem Kadri	Illegal check to the head of Edmonton Oilers forward Matt Fraser during NHL game No. 1039 in Edmonton on Monday, March 16, 2015, at 10:58 of the third period.	4 games	$141,463.40	March 18, 2015

== Schedule and results ==
=== Pre-season ===
2014 preseason game log: 5–2–1 (Home: 3–0–1; Road: 2–2–0)
#	Date	Visitor	Score	Home	OT	Decision	Attendance	Record	Recap
1^{[a]}	September 22	Toronto	3–2	Philadelphia	SO	Heeter		1–0–0	Recap
2	September 23	Philadelphia	0–4	Toronto		Bernier	15,190	2–0–0	Recap
3	September 24	Ottawa	4–3	Toronto	SO	Gibson	17,939	2–0–1	Recap
4	September 24	Toronto	2–3	Ottawa		Heeter	15,865	2–1–1	Recap
5	September 26	Toronto	6–4	Buffalo		Reimer	18,942	3–1–1	Recap
6	September 28	Buffalo	2–3	Toronto	SO	Bernier	17,249	4–1–1	Recap
7	September 29	Toronto	0–3	Detroit		Reimer	14,754	4–2–1	Recap
8	October 3	Detroit	1–5	Toronto		Bernier	18,020	5–2–1	Recap
Notes:^{a} Game was played at Budweiser Gardens in London, Ontario.

=== Regular season ===
2014–15 Game Log: 30–44–8, 68 points (Home: 22–17–2; Road: 8–27–6)

October: 5–4–1, 11 points (Home: 2–4–0; Road: 3–0–1)
#	Date	Visitor	Score	Home	OT	Decision	Attendance	Record	Pts	Recap
1	October 8	Montreal	4–3	Toronto		Bernier (0–1–0)	19,745	0–1–0	0	Recap
2	October 11	Pittsburgh	5–2	Toronto		Bernier (0–2–0)	19,039	0–2–0	0	Recap
3	October 12	Toronto	6–3	NY Rangers		Reimer (1–0–0)	18,006	1–2–0	2	Recap
4	October 14	Colorado	2–3	Toronto	OT	Reimer (2–0–0)	18,754	2–2–0	4	Recap
5	October 17	Detroit	4–1	Toronto		Reimer (2–1–0)	19,054	2–3–0	4	Recap
6	October 18	Toronto	0–1	Detroit	OT	Bernier (0–2–1)	20,027	2–3–1	5	Recap
7	October 21	Toronto	5–2	NY Islanders		Bernier (1–2–1)	11,408	3–3–1	7	Recap
–	October 22	Toronto		Ottawa	Game rescheduled to November 9 due to shootings in Ottawa.
8	October 25	Boston	4–1	Toronto		Bernier (1–3–1)	19,132	3–4–1	7	Recap
9	October 28	Buffalo	0–4	Toronto		Bernier (2–3–1)	18,898	4–4–1	9	Recap
10	October 31	Toronto	4–1	Columbus		Bernier (3–3–1)	14,479	5–4–1	11	Recap

November: 7–4–2, 16 points (Home: 6–2–0; Road: 1–2–2)
#	Date	Visitor	Score	Home	OT	Decision	Attendance	Record	Pts	Recap
11	November 1	Chicago	2–3	Toronto		Reimer (3–1–0)	19,138	6–4–1	13	Recap
12	November 4	Toronto	2–3	Arizona		Reimer (3–2–0)	14,202	6–5–1	13	Recap
13	November 6	Toronto	3–4	Colorado	SO	Bernier (3–3–2)	15,036	6–5–2	14	Recap
14	November 8	NY Rangers	4–5	Toronto		Bernier (4–3–2)	19,320	7–5–2	16	Recap
15	November 9	Toronto	5–3	Ottawa		Reimer (4–2–0)	19,229	8–5–2	18	Recap
16	November 12	Boston	1–6	Toronto		Bernier (5–3–2)	19,264	9–5–2	20	Recap
17	November 14	Pittsburgh	2–1	Toronto		Bernier (5–4–2)	19,295	9–6–2	20	Recap
18	November 15	Toronto	2–6	Buffalo		Reimer (4–3–0)	19,070	9–7–2	20	Recap
19	November 18	Nashville	9–2	Toronto		Bernier (5–5–2)	19,012	9–8–2	20	Recap
20	November 20	Tampa Bay	2–5	Toronto		Bernier (6–5–2)	19,089	10–8–2	22	Recap
21	November 22	Detroit	1–4	Toronto		Bernier (7–5–2)	19,311	11–8–2	24	Recap
22	November 26	Toronto	3–4	Pittsburgh	OT	Bernier (7–5–3)	18,645	11–8–3	25	Recap
23	November 29	Washington	2–6	Toronto		Bernier (8–5–3)	19,161	12–8–3	27	Recap

December: 9–6–0, 18 points (Home: 6–2–0; Road: 3–4–0)
#	Date	Visitor	Score	Home	OT	Decision	Attendance	Record	Pts	Recap
24	December 2	Dallas	3–5	Toronto		Bernier (9–5–3)	19,021	13–8–3	29	Recap
25	December 4	New Jersey	5–3	Toronto		Bernier (9–6–3)	18,877	13–9–3	29	Recap
26	December 6	Vancouver	2–5	Toronto		Bernier (10–6–3)	19,346	14–9–3	31	Recap
27	December 9	Calgary	1–4	Toronto		Bernier (11–6–3)	19,122	15–9–3	33	Recap
28	December 10	Toronto	2–1	Detroit	SO	Reimer (5–3–0)	20,027	16–9–3	35	Recap
29	December 13	Detroit	1–4	Toronto		Bernier (12–6–3)	19,063	17–9–3	37	Recap
30	December 14	Los Angeles	3–4	Toronto	SO	Reimer (6–3–0)	19,219	18–9–3	39	Recap
31	December 16	Anaheim	2–6	Toronto		Bernier (13–6–3)	18,953	19–9–3	41	Recap
32	December 18	Toronto	1–4	Carolina		Bernier (13–7–3)	12,332	19–10–3	41	Recap
33	December 20	Philadelphia	7–4	Toronto		Bernier (13–8–3)	19,343	19–11–3	41	Recap
34	December 21	Toronto	0–4	Chicago		Reimer (6–4–0)	22,131	19–12–3	41	Recap
35	December 23	Toronto	4–0	Dallas		Bernier (14–8–3)	18,532	20–12–3	43	Recap
36	December 28	Toronto	4–6	Florida		Reimer (6–5–0)	17,877	20–13–3	43	Recap
37	December 29	Toronto	2–3	Tampa Bay		Reimer (6–6–0)	19,204	20–14–3	43	Recap
38	December 31	Toronto	4–3	Boston	SO	Bernier (15–8–3)	17,565	21–14–3	45	Recap

January: 1–11–1, 3 points (Home: 1–3–0; Road: 0–8–1)
#	Date	Visitor	Score	Home	OT	Decision	Attendance	Record	Pts	Recap
39	January 2	Toronto	1–3	Minnesota		Bernier (15–9–3)	19,168	21–15–3	45	Recap
40	January 3	Toronto	1–5	Winnipeg		Reimer (6–7–0)	15,016	21–16–3	45	Recap
41	January 7	Washington	6–2	Toronto		Bernier (15–10–3)	19,047	21–17–3	45	Recap
42	January 9	Columbus	2–5	Toronto		Bernier (16–10–3)	18,965	22–17–3	47	Recap
43	January 12	Toronto	0–2	Los Angeles		Bernier (16–11–3)	18,230	22–18–3	47	Recap
44	January 14	Toronto	0–4	Anaheim		Bernier (16–12–3)	16,741	22–19–3	47	Recap
45	January 15	Toronto	1–3	San Jose		Reimer (6–8–0)	17,562	22–20–3	47	Recap
46	January 17	Toronto	0–3	St. Louis		Bernier (16–13–3)	19,626	22–21–3	47	Recap
47	January 19	Carolina	4–1	Toronto		Bernier (16–14–3)	18,979	22–22–3	47	Recap
48	January 21	Toronto	3–4	Ottawa		Reimer (6–9–0)	18,894	22–23–3	47	Recap
49	January 28	Toronto	1–2	New Jersey	SO	Bernier (16–14–4)	15,882	22–23–4	48	Recap
50	January 29	Arizona	3–1	Toronto		Bernier (16–15–4)	18,837	22–24–4	48	Recap
51	January 31	Toronto	0–1	Philadelphia		Reimer (6–10–0)	19,872	22–25–4	48	Recap

February: 3–7–1, 7 points (Home: 3–2–0; Road: 0–5–1)
#	Date	Visitor	Score	Home	OT	Decision	Attendance	Record	Pts	Recap
52	February 3	Toronto	3–4	Nashville		Bernier (16–16–4)	15,667	22–26–4	48	Recap
53	February 6	Toronto	1–4	New Jersey		Reimer (6–11–0)	15,594	22–27–4	48	Recap
54	February 7	Edmonton	1–5	Toronto		Reimer (7–11–0)	19,248	23–27–4	50	Recap
55	February 10	NY Rangers	5–4	Toronto		Reimer (7–12–0)	18,946	23–28–4	50	Recap
56	February 12	Toronto	2–3	NY Islanders		Bernier (16–17–4)	15,388	23–29–4	50	Recap
57	February 14	Toronto	1–2	Montreal	SO	Bernier (16–17–5)	21,287	23–29–5	51	Recap
58	February 17	Florida	3–2	Toronto		Bernier (16–18–5)	19,098	23–30–5	51	Recap
59	February 20	Toronto	1–2	Carolina		Reimer (7–13–0)	12,563	23–31–5	51	Recap
60	February 21	Winnipeg	3–4	Toronto	OT	Bernier (17–18–5)	19,359	24–31–5	53	Recap
61	February 26	Philadelphia	2–3	Toronto		Bernier (18–18–5)	18,892	25–31–5	55	Recap
62	February 28	Toronto	0–4	Montreal		Bernier (18–19–5)	21,287	25–32–5	55	Recap

March: 4–10–1, 9 points (Home: 3–4–1; Road: 1–6–0)
#	Date	Visitor	Score	Home	OT	Decision	Attendance	Record	Pts	Recap
63	March 1	Toronto	0–4	Washington		Reimer (7–14–0)	18,506	25–33–5	55	Recap
64	March 3	Toronto	3–2	Florida		Bernier (19–19–5)	10,198	26–33–5	57	Recap
65	March 5	Toronto	2–4	Tampa Bay		Bernier (19–20–5)	19,204	26–34–5	57	Recap
66	March 7	St. Louis	6–1	Toronto		Bernier (19–21–5)	19,108	26–35–5	57	Recap
67	March 9	NY Islanders	4–3	Toronto	OT	Bernier (19–21–6)	18,984	26–35–6	58	Recap
68	March 11	Buffalo	3–4	Toronto	SO	Bernier (20–21–6)	18,844	27–35–6	60	Recap
69	March 13	Toronto	3–6	Calgary		Reimer (7–15–0)	19,289	27–36–6	60	Recap
70	March 14	Toronto	1–4	Vancouver		Bernier (20–22–6)	18,870	27–37–6	60	Recap
71	March 16	Toronto	1–4	Edmonton		Bernier (20–23–6)	16,839	27–38–6	60	Recap
72	March 19	San Jose	4–1	Toronto		Bernier (20–24–6)	18,926	27–39–6	60	Recap
73	March 21	Toronto	3–5	Ottawa		Bernier (20–25–6)	19,194	27–40–6	60	Recap
74	March 23	Minnesota	2–1	Toronto		Bernier (20–26–6)	18,336	27–41–6	60	Recap
75	March 26	Florida	4–1	Toronto		Bernier (20–27–6)	18,831	27–42–6	60	Recap
76	March 28	Ottawa	3–4	Toronto	OT	Reimer (8–15–0)	18,906	28–42–6	62	Recap
77	March 31	Tampa Bay	1–3	Toronto		Reimer (9–15–0)	18,857	29–42–6	64	Recap

April: 1–2–2, 4 points (Home: 1–0–1; Road: 0–2–1)
#	Date	Visitor	Score	Home	OT	Decision	Attendance	Record	Pts	Recap
78	April 1	Toronto	3–4	Buffalo		Bernier (20–28–6)	19,070	29–43–6	64	Recap
79	April 4	Toronto	1–2	Boston	SO	Reimer (9–15–1)	17,565	29–43–7	65	Recap
80	April 5	Ottawa	2–3	Toronto	SO	Bernier (21–28–6)	18,919	30–43–7	67	Recap
81	April 8	Toronto	0–5	Columbus		Reimer (9–16–1)	15,631	30–44–7	67	Recap
82	April 11	Montreal	4–3	Toronto	SO	Bernier (21–28–7)	19,308	30–44–8	68	Recap

Legend: Win (2 points) Loss (0 points) Overtime/shootout loss (1 point)

== Player statistics ==
Final stats

=== Skaters ===
Regular season
Player	GP	G	A	Pts	+/−	PIM
Phil Kessel	82	25	36	61	−34	30
James van Riemsdyk	82	27	29	56	−33	43
Tyler Bozak	82	23	26	49	−34	44
Nazem Kadri	73	18	21	39	−7	28
Cody Franson^{‡}	55	6	26	32	−7	26
Mike Santorelli^{‡}	57	11	18	29	7	8
Morgan Rielly	81	8	21	29	−16	14
Dion Phaneuf	70	3	26	29	−11	108
Leo Komarov	62	8	18	26	0	18
Peter Holland	62	11	14	25	0	31
Daniel Winnik^{‡}	60	7	18	25	14	23
Jake Gardiner	79	4	20	24	−23	24
Joffrey Lupul	55	10	11	21	−10	26
Richard Panik	76	11	6	17	−8	49
David Clarkson^{‡}	58	10	5	15	−11	92
David Booth	59	7	6	13	−8	25
Roman Polak	56	5	4	9	−22	48
Stephane Robidas	52	1	6	7	8	34
Korbinian Holzer^{‡}	34	0	6	6	3	25
Eric Brewer^{†}	18	2	3	5	−4	12
Trevor Smith	54	2	3	5	−9	12
Brandon Kozun	20	2	2	4	−3	6
Joakim Lindstrom^{†}	19	1	3	4	−7	4
Stuart Percy	9	0	3	3	−4	2
Sam Carrick	16	1	1	2	1	9
Andrew MacWilliam	12	0	2	2	−6	12
Tim Erixon^{†}	15	1	0	1	−5	6
Josh Leivo	9	1	0	1	−1	4
Casey Bailey	6	1	0	1	1	2
T. J. Brennan	6	0	1	1	−7	9
Zach Sill^{†}	21	0	1	1	−2	24
Olli Jokinen^{†‡}	6	0	1	1	1	2
Colton Orr	1	0	0	0	0	0
Troy Bodie	5	0	0	0	0	5
Matt Frattin	9	0	0	0	0	4
Greg McKegg	3	0	0	0	0	0
Petter Granberg	7	0	0	0	1	6
Carter Ashton^{‡}	7	0	0	0	−3	0

=== Goaltenders ===
Regular season
Player	GP	GS	TOI	W	L	OT	GA	GAA	SA	SV%	SO	G	A	PIM
Jonathan Bernier	58	55	3177	21	28	7	152	2.87	1735	.912	2	0	1	0
James Reimer	35	27	1767	9	16	1	93	3.16	1001	.907	0	0	0	2

^{†}Denotes player spent time with another team before joining the Maple Leafs. Stats reflect time with the Maple Leafs only.
^{‡}Denotes player was traded mid-season. Stats reflect time with the Maple Leafs only.
Bold/italics denotes franchise record.

== Notable achievements ==
=== Awards ===
Regular season
Player	Award	Awarded
P. Kessel	NHL All-Star game selection	January 10, 2015

=== Milestones ===
Regular season
Player	Milestone	Reached
B. Kozun	1st Career NHL Game; 1st Career NHL Assist; 1st Career NHL Point	October 8, 2014
S. Percy	1st Career NHL Game; 1st Career NHL Assist; 1st Career NHL Point	October 8, 2014
T. Bozak	300th Career NHL Game	October 14, 2014
S. Carrick	1st Career NHL Game	November 1, 2014
D. Winnik	500th Career NHL Game	November 1, 2014
J. van Riemsdyk	100th Career NHL Goal	November 1, 2014
J. van Riemsdyk	100th Career NHL Assist; 200th Career NHL Point	November 4, 2014
P. Kessel	600th Career NHL Game	November 8, 2014
D. Clarkson	500th Career NHL Game	November 8, 2014
S. Robidas	900th Career NHL Game	November 12, 2014
D. Phaneuf	700th Career NHL Game	November 20, 2014
T. Bozak	200th Career NHL Point	November 20, 2014
N. Kadri	200th Career NHL Game	December 2, 2014
M. Santorelli	100th Career NHL Point	December 2, 2014
R. Panik	100th Career NHL Game	December 13, 2014
M. Rielly	100th Career NHL Game	December 13, 2014
P. Holland	100th Career NHL Game	December 20, 2014
S. Robidas	200th Career NHL Assist	December 20, 2014
J. Lupul	400th Career NHL Point	December 28, 2014
J. Gardiner	200th Career NHL Game	December 28, 2014
P. Kessel	500th Career NHL Point	December 31, 2014
M. Santorelli	300th Career NHL Game	January 12, 2015
E. Brewer	1000th Career NHL Game	March 21, 2015
S. Carrick	1st Career NHL Point	March 21, 2015
C. Bailey	1st Career NHL Game	March 26, 2015
S. Carrick	1st Career NHL Goal	March 26, 2015
J. van Riemsdyk	400th Career NHL Game	March 28, 2015
L. Komarov	100th Career NHL Game	March 31, 2015
C. Bailey	1st Career NHL Goal; 1st Career NHL Point	April 11, 2015
J. Lindstrom	150th Career NHL Game	April 11, 2015
D. Phaneuf	400th Career NHL Point	April 11, 2015

== Transactions ==
The Maple Leafs have been involved in the following transactions during the 2014–15 season.

=== Trades ===
Date	Details
June 28, 2014	To St. Louis Blues Carl Gunnarsson; Calgary's 4th-round pick in 2014 (Ville Husso)	To Toronto Maple Leafs Roman Polak
July 1, 2014	To Columbus Blue Jackets Jerry D'Amigo; Conditional 7th-round pick in 2015	To Toronto Maple Leafs Matt Frattin
February 6, 2015	To Tampa Bay Lightning David Broll; Carter Ashton	To Toronto Maple Leafs Conditional 7th-round pick in 2016
February 15, 2015	To Nashville Predators Cody Franson; Mike Santorelli	To Toronto Maple Leafs Olli Jokinen; Brendan Leipsic; 1st-round pick in 2015
February 25, 2015	To Pittsburgh Penguins Daniel Winnik	To Toronto Maple Leafs Zach Sill; 4th-round pick in 2015; 2nd-round pick in 2016
February 26, 2015	To Chicago Blackhawks Spencer Abbott	To Toronto Maple Leafs T. J. Brennan
February 26, 2015	To Columbus Blue Jackets David Clarkson	To Toronto Maple Leafs Nathan Horton
March 2, 2015	To St. Louis Blues Olli Jokinen	To Toronto Maple Leafs Joakim Lindstrom; Conditional 6th-round pick in 2016
March 2, 2015	To Anaheim Ducks Korbinian Holzer	To Toronto Maple Leafs Eric Brewer; 5th-round pick in 2016
June 19, 2015	To Florida Panthers Greg McKegg	To Toronto Maple Leafs Zach Hyman; Conditional 7th-round pick in 2017

=== Free agents acquired ===
Date	Player	Former team	Contract terms (in U.S. dollars)	Ref
July 1, 2014	Stephane Robidas	Anaheim Ducks	3 years, $9 million	
July 1, 2014	Leo Komarov	Dynamo Moscow	4 years, $11.8 million	
July 3, 2014	Petri Kontiola	Traktor Chelyabinsk	1 year, $1.1 million	
July 3, 2014	Mike Santorelli	Vancouver Canucks	1 year, $1.5 million	
July 22, 2014	David Booth	Vancouver Canucks	1 year, $1.1 million	
July 28, 2014	Daniel Winnik	Anaheim Ducks	1 year, $1.3 million	
September 20, 2014	Cody Donaghey	Quebec Remparts	3 years, entry-level contract	
March 20, 2015	Nikita Soshnikov	Atlant Moscow Oblast	3 years, entry-level contract	
March 21, 2015	Casey Bailey	Pennsylvania State University	2 years, entry-level contract	

=== Free agents lost ===
Date	Player	New team	Contract terms (in U.S. dollars)	Ref
July 1, 2014	T. J. Brennan	New York Islanders	1 year, $600,000	
July 1, 2014	Dave Bolland	Florida Panthers	5 years, $27.5 million	
July 1, 2014	Mason Raymond	Calgary Flames	3 years, $9.5 million	
July 1, 2014	Drew MacIntyre	Carolina Hurricanes	1 year, $600,000	
July 2, 2014	Nikolai Kulemin	New York Islanders	4 years, $16.75 million	
July 2, 2014	Jay McClement	Carolina Hurricanes	1 year, $1 million	
July 3, 2014	Tim Gleason	Carolina Hurricanes	1 year, $1.2 million	
July 15, 2014	Paul Ranger	Geneve-Servette HC	2 years	

=== Claimed via waivers ===
Player	Former team	Date claimed off waivers
Richard Panik	Tampa Bay Lightning	October 9, 2014
Tim Erixon	Chicago Blackhawks	March 1, 2015

=== Lost via waivers ===
Player	New team	Date claimed off waivers

=== Lost via retirement ===
Player

=== Player signings ===
Date	Player	Contract terms (in U.S. dollars)	Ref
July 3, 2014	Troy Bodie	1 year, $600,000	
July 3, 2014	Antoine Bibeau	3-year, $1.965 million entry-level contract	
July 10, 2014	Trevor Smith	1 year, $550,000	
July 10, 2014	Rinat Valiev	3-year, $2,427,500 entry-level contract	
July 11, 2014	Jamie Devane	2 years, $1.15 million	
July 16, 2014	Peter Holland	2 years, $1.55 million	
July 16, 2014	Carter Ashton	1 year, $850,500	
July 21, 2014	Cody Franson	1 year, $3.3 million	
July 25, 2014	James Reimer	2 years, $4.6 million	
July 29, 2014	Jake Gardiner	5 years, $20.25 million	
August 18, 2014	William Nylander	3-year, entry-level contract	
September 9, 2014	Spencer Abbott	1 year	
May 25, 2015	Sam Carrick	1 year	
June 4, 2015	Andreas Johnsson	3 years, entry-level contract	
June 4, 2015	T. J. Brennan	1 year	
June 23, 2015	Petter Granberg	1 year	
June 23, 2015	Tim Erixon	1 year	
June 23, 2015	Zach Hyman	2 years, entry-level contract	

=== Other ===
Name	Date	Details
Peter Horachek	July 11, 2014	Named as an Assistant Coach
Steve Spott	July 11, 2014	Named as an Assistant Coach
Kyle Dubas	July 22, 2014	Named as an Assistant General Manager

== Draft picks ==
The 2014 NHL entry draft was held on June 27–28, 2014 at the Wells Fargo Center in Philadelphia, Pennsylvania.

Round	#	Player	Pos	Nationality	College/Junior/Club team (League)
1	8	William Nylander	(C/LW)	Sweden	Modo Hockey (SHL)
3	68	Rinat Valiev	D	Russia	Kootenay Ice (WHL)
4	103^{[a]}	J. J. Piccinich	RW	United States	Youngstown Phantoms (USHL)
5	128	Dakota Joshua	C	United States	Sioux Falls Stampede (USHL)
6	158	Nolan Vesey	LW	United States	South Shore Kings (USPHL Premier)
7	188	Pierre Engvall	LW	Sweden	Frölunda HC Jr. (SWE)

=== Draft notes ===
- The Toronto Maple Leafs' second-round pick went to the Anaheim Ducks as the result of a trade on November 16, 2013, that sent Peter Holland and Brad Staubitz to Toronto in exchange for Jesse Blacker, Anaheim's seventh round pick in 2014 and this pick (being conditional at the time of the trade). The condition – Anaheim would receive a second-round pick in 2014 if Holland played in 25 or more games for the Maple Leafs during the 2013–14 season – was converted on January 18, 2014.
- The Toronto Maple Leafs' fourth-round pick went to the Chicago Blackhawks as the result of a trade June 30, 2013, that sent Dave Bolland to Toronto in exchange for a second-round pick in 2013, Anaheim's fourth round pick in 2013 and this pick.
- ^{a} The Arizona Coyotes' fourth round pick went to the Toronto Maple Leafs as the result of a trade on January 16, 2013, that sent Matthew Lombardi to Phoenix in exchange for this pick (being conditional at the time of the trade). The condition – If Lombardi did not re-sign with Phoenix for the 2013–14 season, then Toronto would receive a fourth-round pick in 2014 – was converted on August 29, 2013.
