= 2014–15 Washington Capitals season =

NHL ice hockey team season

2014–15 Washington Capitals
- Division: 2nd Metropolitan
- Conference: 4th Eastern
- 2014–15 record: 45–26–11
- Home record: 23–13–5
- Road record: 22–13–6
- Goals for: 242
- Goals against: 203

Team information
- General manager: Brian MacLellan
- Coach: Barry Trotz
- Captain: Alexander Ovechkin
- Alternate captains: Nicklas Backstrom; Brooks Orpik
- Arena: Verizon Center
- Average attendance: 19,099 (41 games)

Team leaders
- Goals: Alexander Ovechkin (53)
- Assists: Nicklas Backstrom (60)
- Points: Alexander Ovechkin (81)
- Penalty minutes: Tom Wilson (172)
- Plus/minus: Mike Green (+15)
- Wins: Braden Holtby (41)
- Goals against average: Philipp Grubauer (1.85)

The 2014–15 Washington Capitals season was the 41st season for the National Hockey League (NHL) franchise that was established on June 11, 1974.

The Washington Capitals 40th Anniversary patch

== Off-season ==
Less than two weeks after the end of the Capitals' 2013–14 season, where the team missed the playoffs for the first time since 2007, the Washington Capitals announced that Head Coach Adam Oates was fired and general manager George McPhee would not have his contract with the team renewed. On May 26, 2014, the Capitals promoted Brian MacLellan to be senior vice president and general manager and named Barry Trotz their new head coach.

In July 2014, the Capitals signed several free agents, including former Pittsburgh Penguins defensemen Matt Niskanen and Brooks Orpik.

== Playoffs ==
The Washington Capitals entered the playoffs as the Metropolitan Division's second seed. They defeated the New York Islanders in the first round, and were defeated by the New York Rangers in the second round.

== Standings ==
Metropolitan Division
Pos	Team	GP	W	L	OTL	ROW	GF	GA	GD	Pts
1	p – New York Rangers	82	53	22	7	49	252	192	+60	113
2	x – Washington Capitals	82	45	26	11	40	242	203	+39	101
3	x – New York Islanders	82	47	28	7	40	252	230	+22	101
4	x – Pittsburgh Penguins	82	43	27	12	39	221	210	+11	98
5	Columbus Blue Jackets	82	42	35	5	33	236	250	−14	89
6	Philadelphia Flyers	82	33	31	18	30	215	234	−19	84
7	New Jersey Devils	82	32	36	14	27	181	216	−35	78
8	Carolina Hurricanes	82	30	41	11	25	188	226	−38	71

Source: National Hockey League
p – Clinched Presidents' Trophy; x – Clinched playoff spot

== Schedule and results ==
=== Pre-season ===
2014 preseason game log: 5–3–0 (Home: 4–0–0; Road: 1–3–0)
#	Date	Visitor	Score	Home	OT	Decision	Attendance	Record	Recap
1	September 21	Buffalo	0–1	Washington		Holtby	16,707	1–0–0	Recap
2	September 22	Washington	4–5	Philadelphia		Grubauer	17,679	1–1–0	Recap
3	September 24	Washington	0–2	Boston		Copley	17,215	1–2–0	Recap
4	September 26	Boston	4–5	Washington	OT	Peters	17,426	2–2–0	Recap
5	September 28	Washington	2–0	Montreal		Holtby	21,287	3–2–0	Recap
6	October 1	Washington	1–6	Buffalo		Holtby	18,228	3–3–0	Recap
7	October 2	Philadelphia	2–3	Washington	SO	Peters	16,765	4–3–0	Recap
8	October 5	Carolina	2–5	Washington		Holtby	16,138	5–3–0	Recap

=== Regular season ===
2014–15 Game Log

October: 4–3–2 (Home: 2–1–2; Road: 2–2–0)
#	Date	Visitor	Score	Home	OT	Decision	Attendance	Record	Pts	Recap
1	October 9	Montreal	2–1	Washington	SO	Holtby	18,506	0–0–1	1	Recap
2	October 11	Washington	4–0	Boston		Holtby	17,565	1–0–1	3	Recap
3	October 14	San Jose	6–5	Washington	SO	Peters	18,506	1–0–2	4	Recap
4	October 16	New Jersey	2–6	Washington		Holtby	18,506	2–0–2	6	Recap
5	October 18	Florida	1–2	Washington	SO	Peters	18,506	3–0–2	8	Recap
6	October 22	Washington	2–3	Edmonton		Holtby	16,839	3–1–2	8	Recap
7	October 25	Washington	3–1	Calgary		Holtby	19,095	4–1–2	10	Recap
8	October 26	Washington	2–4	Vancouver		Peters	18,427	4–2–2	10	Recap
9	October 29	Detroit	4–2	Washington		Holtby	18,506	4–3–2	10	Recap

November: 6–6–2 (Home: 3–3–1; Road: 3–3–1)
#	Date	Visitor	Score	Home	OT	Decision	Attendance	Record	Pts	Recap
10	November 1	Washington	3–4	Tampa Bay		Holtby	19,119	4–4–2	10	Recap
11	November 2	Arizona	6–5	Washington		Peters	18,506	4–5–2	10	Recap
12	November 4	Calgary	4–3	Washington	OT	Holtby	18,506	4–5–3	11	Recap
13	November 7	Washington	3–2	Chicago		Holtby	21,892	5–5–3	13	Recap
14	November 8	Carolina	3–4	Washington	OT	Peters	18,506	6–5–3	15	Recap
15	November 11	Columbus	2–4	Washington		Holtby	18,506	7–5–3	17	Recap
16	November 14	New Jersey	1–0	Washington		Holtby	18,506	7–6–3	17	Recap
17	November 15	Washington	1–4	St. Louis		Peters	19,339	7–7–3	17	Recap
18	November 18	Washington	2–1	Arizona	OT	Holtby	11,769	8–7–3	19	Recap
19	November 20	Washington	3–2	Colorado		Holtby	16,476	9–7–3	21	Recap
20	November 22	Buffalo	2–1	Washington		Holtby	18,506	9–8–3	21	Recap
21	November 26	Washington	2–3	NY Islanders	OT	Holtby	16,170	9–8–4	22	Recap
22	November 28	NY Islanders	2–5	Washington		Holtby	18,506	10–8–4	24	Recap
23	November 29	Washington	2–6	Toronto		Holtby	19,161	10–9–4	24	Recap

December: 8–2–3 (Home: 2–1–1; Road: 6–1–2)
#	Date	Visitor	Score	Home	OT	Decision	Attendance	Record	Pts	Recap
24	December 2	Vancouver	4–3	Washington		Holtby	18,506	10–10–4	24	Recap
25	December 4	Washington	2–1	Carolina		Holtby	10,783	11–10–4	26	Recap
26	December 6	Washington	4–1	New Jersey		Holtby	15,230	12–10–4	28	Recap
27	December 9	Washington	5–3	Tampa Bay		Holtby	17,109	13–10–4	30	Recap
28	December 11	Columbus	3–2	Washington	OT	Holtby	18,506	13–10–5	31	Recap
29	December 13	Tampa Bay	2–4	Washington		Holtby	18,506	14–10–5	33	Recap
30	December 16	Washington	1–2	Florida	SO	Holtby	10,012	14–10–6	34	Recap
31	December 18	Washington	5–4	Columbus	OT	Holtby	13,722	15–10–6	36	Recap
32	December 20	Washington	4–0	New Jersey		Holtby	14,776	16–10–6	38	Recap
33	December 22	Ottawa	1–2	Washington		Holtby	18,506	17–10–6	40	Recap
34	December 23	Washington	2–4	NY Rangers		Holtby	18,006	17–11–6	40	Recap
35	December 27	Washington	3–0	Pittsburgh		Holtby	18,663	18–11–6	42	Recap
36	December 29	Washington	3–4	NY Islanders	OT	Holtby	16,170	18–11–7	43	Recap

January: 7–3–3 (Home: 6–0–1; Road: 1–3–2)
#	Date	Visitor	Score	Home	OT	Decision	Attendance	Record	Pts	Recap
37	January 1 (Winter Classic)	Chicago	2–3	Washington		Holtby	42,832 (at Nationals Park)	19–11–7	45	Recap
38	January 4	Florida	3–4	Washington		Holtby	18,506	20–11–7	47	Recap
39	January 7	Washington	6–2	Toronto		Holtby	19,047	21–11–7	49	Recap
40	January 8	Washington	2–3	Philadelphia	OT	Holtby	19,703	21–11–8	50	Recap
41	January 10	Detroit	1–3	Washington		Holtby	18,506	22–11–8	52	Recap
42	January 12	Colorado	1–2	Washington		Holtby	18,506	23–11–8	54	Recap
43	January 14	Philadelphia	0–1	Washington		Holtby	18,506	24–11–8	56	Recap
44	January 16	Washington	3–4	Nashville		Holtby	17,303	24–12–8	56	Recap
45	January 17	Washington	4–5	Dallas		Peters	18,532	24–13–8	56	Recap
46	January 20	Edmonton	5–4	Washington	SO	Holtby	18,506	24–13–9	57	Recap
47	January 27	Washington	3–4	Columbus		Holtby	16,514	24–14–9	57	Recap
48	January 28	Pittsburgh	0–4	Washington		Holtby	18,506	25–14–9	59	Recap
49	January 31	Washington	0–1	Montreal	OT	Holtby	21,286	25–14–10	60	Recap

February: 8–6–0 (Home: 4–3–0; Road: 4–3–0)
#	Date	Visitor	Score	Home	OT	Decision	Attendance	Record	Pts	Recap
50	February 1	St. Louis	4–3	Washington		Peters	18,506	25–15–10	60	Recap
51	February 3	Los Angeles	0–4	Washington		Holtby	18,506	26–15–10	62	Recap
52	February 5	Washington	2–1	Ottawa		Holtby	16,543	27–15–10	64	Recap
53	February 6	Anaheim	2–3	Washington	SO	Grubauer	18,506	28–15–10	66	Recap
54	February 8	Philadelphia	3–1	Washington		Holtby	18,506	28–16–10	66	Recap
55	February 11	Washington	5–4	San Jose	OT	Holtby	16,956	29–16–10	68	Recap
56	February 14	Washington	1–3	Los Angeles		Holtby	18,230	29–17–10	68	Recap
57	February 15	Washington	5–3	Anaheim		Peters	17,252	30–17–10	70	Recap
58	February 17	Washington	3–1	Pittsburgh		Holtby	18,663	31–17–10	72	Recap
59	February 19	Winnipeg	1–5	Washington		Holtby	18,506	32–17–10	74	Recap
60	February 21	NY Islanders	2–3	Washington	SO	Holtby	18,506	33–17–10	76	Recap
61	February 22	Washington	2–3	Philadelphia		Holtby	19,703	33–18–10	76	Recap
62	February 25	Pittsburgh	4–3	Washington		Holtby	18,506	33–19–10	76	Recap
63	February 27	Washington	0–3	Carolina		Holtby	13,415	33–20–10	76	Recap

March: 9–5–0 (Home: 5–4–0; Road: 4–1–0)
#	Date	Visitor	Score	Home	OT	Decision	Attendance	Record	Pts	Recap
64	March 1	Toronto	0–4	Washington		Holtby	18,506	34–20–10	78	Recap
65	March 3	Washington	5–3	Columbus		Holtby	16,514	35–20–10	80	Recap
66	March 5	Minnesota	2–1	Washington		Holtby	18,506	35–21–10	80	Recap
67	March 7	Buffalo	1–6	Washington		Holtby	18,506	36–21–10	82	Recap
68	March 11	NY Rangers	3–1	Washington		Holtby	18,506	36–22–10	82	Recap
69	March 13	Dallas	4–2	Washington		Holtby	18,506	36–23–10	82	Recap
70	March 15	Boston	0–2	Washington		Holtby	18,506	37–23–10	84	Recap
71	March 16	Washington	4–3	Buffalo	SO	Holtby	19,070	38–23–10	86	Recap
72	March 19	Washington	3–2	Minnesota		Holtby	19,044	39–23–10	88	Recap
73	March 21	Washington	0–3	Winnipeg		Holtby	15,016	39–24–10	88	Recap
74	March 26	New Jersey	2–3	Washington	OT	Holtby	18,506	40–24–10	90	Recap
75	March 28	Nashville	4–3	Washington		Peters	18,506	40–25–10	90	Recap
76	March 29	Washington	5–2	NY Rangers		Holtby	18,006	41–25–10	92	Recap
77	March 31	Carolina	2–4	Washington		Holtby	18,506	42–25–10	94	Recap

April: 3–1–1 (Home: 1–1–0; Road: 2–0–1)
#	Date	Visitor	Score	Home	OT	Decision	Attendance	Record	Pts	Recap
78	April 2	Washington	5–4	Montreal	SO	Holtby	21,286	43–25–10	96	Recap
79	April 4	Washington	3–4	Ottawa	OT	Holtby	16,543	43–25–11	97	Recap
80	April 5	Washington	2–1	Detroit		Holtby	20,027	44–25–11	99	Recap
81	April 8	Boston	0–3	Washington		Holtby	18,506	45–25–11	101	Recap
82	April 11	NY Rangers	4–2	Washington		Holtby	18,506	45–26–11	101	Recap

Legend: Win (2 points) Loss (0 points) Overtime/shootout loss (1 point)

=== Playoffs ===
2015 Stanley Cup Playoffs

Eastern Conference First Round vs. (M3) New York Islanders: Washington wins 4–3
#	Date	Visitor	Score	Home	OT	Decision	Attendance	Series	Recap
1	April 15	NY Islanders	4–1	Washington		Holtby	18,506	0–1	Recap
2	April 17	NY Islanders	3–4	Washington		Grubauer	18,506	1–1	Recap
3	April 19	Washington	1–2	NY Islanders	OT	Holtby	16,170	1–2	Recap
4	April 21	Washington	2–1	NY Islanders	OT	Holtby	16,170	2–2	Recap
5	April 23	NY Islanders	1–5	Washington		Holtby	18,506	3–2	Recap
6	April 25	Washington	1–3	NY Islanders		Holtby	16,170	3–3	Recap
7	April 27	NY Islanders	1–2	Washington		Holtby	18,506	4–3	Recap

Eastern Conference Second Round vs. (M1) New York Rangers: Rangers win 4–3
#	Date	Visitor	Score	Home	OT	Decision	Attendance	Series	Recap
1	April 30	Washington	2–1	NY Rangers		Holtby	18,006	1–0	Recap
2	May 2	Washington	2–3	NY Rangers		Holtby	18,006	1–1	Recap
3	May 4	NY Rangers	0–1	Washington		Holtby	18,506	2–1	Recap
4	May 6	NY Rangers	1–2	Washington		Holtby	18,506	3–1	Recap
5	May 8	Washington	1–2	NY Rangers	OT	Holtby	18,006	3–2	Recap
6	May 10	NY Rangers	4–3	Washington		Holtby	18,506	3–3	Recap
7	May 13	Washington	1–2	NY Rangers	OT	Holtby	18,006	3–4	Recap

Legend: Win Loss

== Player statistics ==
Final stats

Skaters

Regular season
Player	GP	G	A	Pts	+/−	PIM
Alexander Ovechkin	81	53	28	81	10	58
Nicklas Backstrom	82	18	60	78	5	40
John Carlson	82	12	43	55	11	28
Marcus Johansson	82	20	27	47	6	10
Mike Green	72	10	35	45	15	34
Troy Brouwer	82	21	22	43	11	53
Evgeny Kuznetsov	80	11	26	37	10	24
Joel Ward	82	19	15	34	−4	30
Eric Fehr	75	19	14	33	8	20
Matt Niskanen	82	4	27	31	7	47
Andre Burakovsky	53	9	13	22	12	10
Karl Alzner	82	5	16	21	14	20
Jay Beagle	62	10	10	20	6	20
Brooks Laich	66	7	13	20	−2	24
Jason Chimera	77	7	12	19	−1	51
Brooks Orpik	78	0	19	19	5	66
Tom Wilson	67	4	13	17	−1	172
Curtis Glencross^{†}	18	4	3	7	−1	6
Michael Latta	53	0	6	6	4	68
Jack Hillen^{‡}	35	0	5	5	1	10
Nate Schmidt	39	1	3	4	−2	10
Liam O'Brien	13	1	1	2	4	23
Tim Gleason^{†}	17	0	2	2	5	11
Chris Brown	5	1	0	1	1	2
Stanislav Galiev	2	1	0	1	1	0
Chris Conner	2	0	0	0	1	4
Aaron Volpatti	2	0	0	0	0	0
Steven Oleksy	1	0	0	0	−1	0
Cameron Schilling	4	0	0	0	1	4

Playoffs
Player	GP	G	A	Pts	+/−	PIM
Alexander Ovechkin	14	5	4	9	−3	6
Joel Ward	14	3	6	9	1	2
Nicklas Backstrom	14	3	5	8	−3	2
Evgeny Kuznetsov	14	5	2	7	4	8
Jason Chimera	14	3	4	7	4	4
John Carlson	14	1	5	6	3	4
Jay Beagle	14	1	4	5	0	4
Karl Alzner	14	2	2	4	0	6
Marcus Johansson	14	1	3	4	2	2
Matt Niskanen	14	0	4	4	−2	0
Andre Burakovsky	11	2	1	3	2	0
Troy Brouwer	14	0	3	3	−3	10
Brooks Laich	14	1	1	2	1	0
Brooks Orpik	14	0	2	2	5	8
Mike Green	14	0	2	2	−1	14
Curtis Glencross	10	1	0	1	−5	2
Tim Gleason	14	0	1	1	−3	5
Tom Wilson	13	0	1	1	−2	25
Eric Fehr	4	0	0	0	−1	2
Michael Latta	4	0	0	0	−1	2

Goaltenders

Regular season
Player	GP	GS	TOI	W	L	OT	GA	GAA	SA	SV%	SO	G	A	PIM
Braden Holtby	73	72	4247	41	20	10	157	2.22	2044	.923	9	0	2	2
Justin Peters	12	9	647	3	6	1	35	3.25	294	.881	0	0	0	0
Philipp Grubauer	1	1	65	1	0	0	2	1.85	25	.920	0	0	0	0

Playoffs
Player	GP	GS	TOI	W	L	GA	GAA	SA	SV%	SO	G	A	PIM
Braden Holtby	13	13	806	6	7	23	1.71	412	.944	1	0	1	0
Philipp Grubauer	1	1	60	1	0	3	3.00	21	.857	0	0	0	0

^{†}Denotes player spent time with another team before joining the Capitals. Stats reflect time with the Capitals only.
^{‡}Denotes player was traded mid-season. Stats reflect time with the Capitals only.
Bold/italics denotes franchise record.

== Notable achievements ==
=== Awards ===
Regular season
Player	Award	Awarded
A. Ovechkin	NHL Second Star of the Week	January 5, 2015
A. Ovechkin	NHL All-Star game selection	January 10, 2015
A. Ovechkin	NHL First Star of the Month	February 2, 2015
A. Ovechkin	NHL Third Star of the Month	March 1, 2015

=== Milestones ===
Regular season
Player	Milestone	Reached
L. O'Brien	1st Career NHL Game	October 9, 2014
A. Burakovsky	1st Career NHL Game; 1st Career NHL Goal; 1st Career NHL Point	October 9, 2014
A. Burakovsky	1st Career NHL Assist	October 14, 2014
L. O'Brien	1st Career NHL Goal	October 26, 2014
J. Chimera	800th Career NHL Game	October 29, 2014
M. Niskanen	500th Career NHL Game	October 29, 2014
M. Johansson	100th Career NHL Assist	November 2, 2014
A. Ovechkin	Capitals All-Time Franchise Points Record	November 4, 2014
J. Beagle	200th Career NHL Game	November 7, 2014
A. Ovechkin	400th Career NHL Assist	November 8, 2014
A. Ovechkin	700th Career NHL Game	November 26, 2014
E. Fehr	400th Career NHL Game	December 2, 2014
J. Ward	200th Career NHL Point	December 6, 2014
B. Laich	300th Career NHL Point	December 6, 2014
T. Wilson	100th Career NHL Game	December 11, 2014
M. Johansson	300th Career NHL Game	January 1, 2015
N. Backstrom	400th Career NHL Assist	January 27, 2015
T. Brouwer	500th Career NHL Game	February 3, 2015
K. Alzner	400th Career NHL Game	February 11, 2015
J. Ward	500th Career NHL Game	March 3, 2015
N. Backstrom	Capitals All-Time Franchise Assists Record	March 15, 2015
S. Galiev	1st Career NHL Game	April 8, 2015
B. Holtby	20th Career NHL Shutout	April 8, 2015
S. Galiev	1st Career NHL Goal; 1st Career NHL Point	April 11, 2015

== Transactions ==
The Capitals have been involved in the following transactions during the 2014–15 season.

=== Trades ===
June 28, 2014	To Buffalo Sabres 2nd-round pick in 2014; 3rd-round pick in 2014	To Washington Capitals 2nd-round pick in 2014
June 28, 2014	To Winnipeg Jets 6th-round pick in 2014; NSH's 7th-round pick in 2014; 7th-round pick in 2015	To Washington Capitals Edward Pasquale; 6th-round pick in 2014
June 28, 2014	To New York Rangers 4th-round pick in 2014; CHI's 4th-round pick in 2014	To Washington Capitals 3rd-round pick in 2014
February 28, 2015	To Carolina Hurricanes Jack Hillen; ARZ's 4th-round pick in 2015	To Washington Capitals Tim Gleason
March 1, 2015	To Calgary Flames 2nd-round pick in 2015; 3rd-round pick in 2015	To Washington Capitals Curtis Glencross

=== Free agents acquired ===
Date	Player	Former team	Contract terms (in U.S. dollars)	Ref
July 1, 2014	Brooks Orpik	Pittsburgh Penguins	5-years, $27.5 million	
July 1, 2014	Justin Peters	Carolina Hurricanes	2-years, $1.9 million	
July 1, 2014	Matt Niskanen	Pittsburgh Penguins	7-years, $40.25 million	
July 1, 2014	Mike Moore	Providence Bruins	1-year, $550,000	
July 1, 2014	Jon Landry	Iowa Wild	1-year, $550,000	
July 1, 2014	Chris Conner	Pittsburgh Penguins	1 year, $550,000	
July 4, 2014	Tim Kennedy	Arizona Coyotes	1-year, $550,000	
July 4, 2014	Kris Newbury	Philadelphia Flyers	1-year, $550,000	
October 6, 2014	Liam O'Brien	Rouyn-Noranda Huskies	3 years, $1.865 million entry-level contract	

=== Free agents lost ===
Date	Player	New team	Contract terms (in U.S. dollars)	Ref
July 1, 2014	David Leggio	New York Islanders	1 year, $700,000	
July 2, 2014	Joel Rechlicz	Minnesota Wild	1 year, $600,000	
July 2, 2014	Mikhail Grabovski	New York Islanders	4 years, $20 million	
July 3, 2014	Tyson Strachan	Buffalo Sabres	1 year, $650,000	
August 8, 2014	Julien Brouillette	Winnipeg Jets	1 year, $600,000	

=== Claimed via waivers ===
Player	Previous team	Date

=== Lost via waivers ===
Player	New team	Date

=== Player signings ===
Date	Player	Contract terms (in U.S. dollars)	Ref
July 1, 2014	Michael Latta	2-years, $1.15 million	
July 9, 2014	Edward Pasquale	1-year, $550,000	
July 13, 2014	Nate Schmidt	1-year, $625,000	
July 15, 2014	Vitek Vanecek	3-year, $2.3275 million entry-level contract	
July 15, 2014	Jakub Vrana	3-year, $2.775 million entry-level contract	
July 25, 2014	Nathan Walker	3-year, entry-level contract	
September 9, 2014	Cameron Schilling	1 year	
March 4, 2015	Tyler Lewington	3-year, entry-level contract	
March 31, 2015	Travis Boyd	2-year, entry-level contract	
April 17, 2015	Riley Barber	2-year, entry-level contract	
June 2, 2015	Garrett Mitchell	2-years	
June 15, 2015	Philipp Grubauer	2-years, $1.5 million	
June 17, 2015	Nate Schmidt	2-years, $1.625 million	

=== Suspensions/fines ===
Player	Explanation	Length	Salary	Date issued
Tom Wilson	Diving/Embellishment during NHL Game No. 1057 in Minnesota on Thursday, March 19, 2015, at 14:45 of the second period.	–	$2,000.00	March 27, 2015

== Draft picks ==
The 2014 NHL entry draft will be held on June 27–28, 2014, at the Wells Fargo Center in Philadelphia, Pennsylvania.

Round	#	Player	Pos	Nationality	College/Junior/Club team (League)
1	13	Jakub Vrana	L/RW	Czech Republic	Linkopings HC (Sweden)
2	39^{[a]}	Vitek Vanecek	G	Czech Republic	Bili Tygri Liberec (Czech Republic)
3	89^{[b]}	Nathan Walker	LW	Australia	Hershey Bears (AHL)
5	134	Shane Gersich	C/LW	United States	USA U-18 (USHL)
6	159^{[c]}	Steven Spinner	RW	United States	Eden Prairie High School (USHS–MN)
7	194	Kevin Elgestal	RW	Sweden	Frolunda HC (J20 SuperElit)

Notes

- ^{a} The Buffalo Sabres' second-round pick (from the Minnesota Wild originally from the Winnipeg Jets) went to the Washington Capitals as a result of a June 28, 2014 trade that sent a 2014 second-round pick and 2014 third-round pick to the Sabres in exchange for this pick.
- The Washington Capitals' second-round pick went to the Buffalo Sabres as a result of a June 28, 2014 trade that sent a 2014 second-round pick (from the Minnesota Wild originally from the Winnipeg Jets) to the Capitals exchange for a 2014 third-round pick and this pick.
- The Washington Capitals' third-round pick went to the Buffalo Sabres as a result of a June 28, 2014 trade that sent a 2014 second-round pick (from the Minnesota Wild originally from the Winnipeg Jets) to the Capitals exchange for a 2014 second-round pick and this pick.
- ^{b} The New York Rangers' third-round pick went to the Washington Capitals as a result of a June 28, 2014 trade that sent two 2014 fourth-round picks to the Rangers in exchange for this pick.
- The Washington Capitals' fourth-round pick went to the New York Rangers as a result of a June 28, 2014 trade that sent a 2014 third-round pick to the Capitals exchange for a 2014 fourth-round pick (from the New York Islanders originally from the Chicago Blackhawks) and this pick.
- ^{c} The Winnipeg Jets' sixth-round pick went to the Washington Capitals as a result of a June 28, 2014 trade that sent a 2014 sixth-round pick, a 2014 seventh-round pick (from the Nashville Predators) and a 2015 seventh-round pick to the Jets in exchange for Edward Pasquale and this pick.
- The Washington Capitals' sixth-round pick went to the Winnipeg Jets as a result of a June 28, 2014 trade that sent Edward Pasquale and a 2014 sixth-round pick to the Capitals exchange for a 2014 seventh-round pick (from the Nashville Predators) and a 2015 seventh-round pick and this pick.
