= 2014–15 Detroit Red Wings season =

Sports season

2014–15 Detroit Red Wings
- Division: 3rd Atlantic
- Conference: 6th Eastern
- 2014–15 record: 43–25–14
- Home record: 22–10–9
- Road record: 21–15–5
- Goals for: 235
- Goals against: 221

Team information
- General manager: Ken Holland
- Coach: Mike Babcock
- Captain: Henrik Zetterberg
- Alternate captains: Pavel Datsyuk; Niklas Kronwall
- Arena: Joe Louis Arena
- Average attendance: 20,027 (100%); Total: 821,107
- Minor league affiliates: Grand Rapids Griffins (AHL); Toledo Walleye (ECHL)

Team leaders
- Goals: Tomas Tatar (29)
- Assists: Henrik Zetterberg (49)
- Points: Henrik Zetterberg (66)
- Penalty minutes: Kyle Quincey (77)
- Plus/minus: Pavel Datsyuk (+12)
- Wins: Jimmy Howard (23)
- Goals against average: Petr Mrazek (2.38)

The 2014–15 Detroit Red Wings season was the 89th season for the National Hockey League (NHL) franchise that was established on September 25, 1926.

== Off-season ==
On May 23, 2014, it was announced that restricted free agent centre Cory Emmerton had signed with HC Sochi of the Kontinental Hockey League (KHL) for the 2014–15 season.

On June 19, 2014, former Red Wings assistant coach, Bill Peters, was hired as the new head coach of the Carolina Hurricanes. On July 15, 2014, the Red Wings hired Tony Granato as an assistant coach. On July 30, 2014, the Red Wings hired Jim Hiller and Andrew Brewer as assistant coaches.

On August 14, 2014, the Red Wings signed executive vice president and general manager Ken Holland to a four-year contract extension through the end of the 2017–18 season.

== Standings ==
Atlantic Division
Pos	Team	GP	W	L	OTL	ROW	GF	GA	GD	Pts
1	y – Montreal Canadiens	82	50	22	10	43	221	189	+32	110
2	x – Tampa Bay Lightning	82	50	24	8	47	262	211	+51	108
3	x – Detroit Red Wings	82	43	25	14	39	235	221	+14	100
4	x – Ottawa Senators	82	43	26	13	37	238	215	+23	99
5	Boston Bruins	82	41	27	14	37	213	211	+2	96
6	Florida Panthers	82	38	29	15	30	206	223	−17	91
7	Toronto Maple Leafs	82	30	44	8	25	211	262	−51	68
8	Buffalo Sabres	82	23	51	8	15	161	274	−113	54

Source: National Hockey League
x – Clinched playoff spot; y – Clinched division

== Schedule and results ==
=== Pre-season ===
2014 preseason game log: 4–3–1 (Home: 2–2–0; Road: 2–1–1)
#	Date	Visitor	Score	Home	OT	Decision	Attendance	Record	Recap
1	September 22	Detroit	W 2–1	Pittsburgh		Howard	17,543	1–0–0	Recap
2	September 23	Detroit	L 1–2	Chicago	OT	Mrazek	20,512	1–0–1	Recap
3	September 25	Chicago	W 2–3	Detroit		Howard	16,246	2–0–1	Recap
4	September 27	Boston	L 3–1	Detroit		Gustavsson	15,976	2–1–1	Recap
5	September 29	Toronto	W 0–3	Detroit		Mrazek	14,754	3–1–1	Recap
6	October 1	Pittsburgh	L 2–0	Detroit		Howard	16,387	3–2–1	Recap
7	October 3	Detroit	L 1–5	Toronto		Gustavsson	18,020	3–3–1	Recap
8	October 4	Detroit	W 4–3	Boston	SO	Mrazek	17,565	4–3–1	Recap

=== Regular season ===
2014–15 Game Log

October: 6–2–2 (Home: 4–1–1; Road: 2–1–1)
#	Date	Visitor	Score	Home	OT	Decision	Attendance	Record	Pts	Recap
1	October 9	Boston	W 1–2	Detroit		Howard	20,027	1–0–0	2	Recap
2	October 11	Anaheim	L 3–2	Detroit		Howard	20,027	1–1–0	2	Recap
3	October 15	Boston	L 3–2	Detroit	SO	Howard	20,027	1–1–1	3	Recap
4	October 17	Detroit	W 4–1	Toronto		Howard	19,054	2–1–1	5	Recap
5	October 18	Toronto	W 0–1	Detroit	OT	Gustavsson	20,027	3–1–1	7	Recap
6	October 21	Detroit	L 1–2	Montreal	OT	Howard	21,287	3–1–2	8	Recap
7	October 23	Pittsburgh	W 3–4	Detroit	OT	Howard	20,027	4–1–2	10	Recap
8	October 25	Detroit	L 2–4	Philadelphia		Gustavsson	19,867	4–2–2	10	Recap
9	October 29	Detroit	W 4–2	Washington		Howard	18,506	5–2–2	12	Recap
10	October 31	Los Angeles	W 2–5	Detroit		Howard	20,027	6–2–2	14	Recap

November: 8–3–3 (Home: 5–1–1; Road: 3–2–2)
#	Date	Visitor	Score	Home	OT	Decision	Attendance	Record	Pts	Recap
11	November 2	Detroit	L 2–3	Buffalo	SO	Howard	17,815	6–2–3	15	Recap
12	November 4	Detroit	L 1–3	Ottawa		Howard	16,436	6–3–3	15	Recap
13	November 5	Detroit	L 3–4	N.Y. Rangers	OT	Gustavsson	18,006	6–3–4	16	Recap
14	November 7	New Jersey	W 2–4	Detroit		Howard	20,027	7–3–4	18	Recap
15	November 9	Tampa Bay	L 4–3	Detroit	SO	Howard	20,027	7–3–5	19	Recap
16	November 14	Chicago	W 1–4	Detroit		Howard	20,027	8–3–5	21	Recap
17	November 16	Montreal	L 4–1	Detroit		Howard	20,027	8–4–5	21	Recap
18	November 18	Detroit	W 5–0	Columbus		Howard	15,438	9–4–5	23	Recap
19	November 20	Detroit	W 4–3	Winnipeg		Mrazek	15,016	10–4–5	25	Recap
20	November 22	Detroit	L 1–4	Toronto		Howard	19,311	10–5–5	25	Recap
21	November 24	Ottawa	W 3–4	Detroit		Howard	20,027	11–5–5	27	Recap
22	November 26	Philadelphia	W 2–5	Detroit		Howard	20,027	12–5–5	29	Recap
23	November 28	Detroit	W 5–4	New Jersey	SO	Mrazek	16,592	13–5–5	31	Recap
24	November 30	Vancouver	W 3–5	Detroit		Howard	20,027	14–5–5	33	Recap

December: 6–4–4 (Home: 4–2–4; Road: 2–2–0)
#	Date	Visitor	Score	Home	OT	Decision	Attendance	Record	Pts	Recap
25	December 2	Florida	L 4–3	Detroit		Howard	20,027	14–6–5	33	Recap
26	December 4	Dallas	W 2–5	Detroit		Howard	20,027	15–6–5	35	Recap
27	December 6	N.Y. Rangers	W 2–3	Detroit		Howard	20,027	16–6–5	37	Recap
28	December 7	Detroit	W 3–1	Carolina		Mrazek	13,489	17–6–5	39	Recap
29	December 10	Toronto	L 2–1	Detroit	SO	Howard	20,027	17–6–6	40	Recap
30	December 12	Florida	L 3–2	Detroit	SO	Howard	20,027	17–6–7	41	Recap
31	December 13	Detroit	L 1–4	Toronto		Mrazek	19,063	17–7–7	41	Recap
32	December 16	Columbus	L 1–0	Detroit	SO	Howard	20,027	17–7–8	42	Recap
33	December 19	N.Y. Islanders	L 2–1	Detroit		Mrazek	20,027	17–8–8	42	Recap
34	December 21	Colorado	L 2–1	Detroit	SO	Mrazek	20,027	17–8–9	43	Recap
35	December 23	Buffalo	W 3–6	Detroit		Mrazek	20,027	18–8–9	45	Recap
36	December 27	Detroit	W 3–2	Ottawa	OT	Howard	17,194	19–8–9	47	Recap
37	December 29	Detroit	L 2–5	Boston		Howard	17,565	19–9–9	47	Recap
38	December 31	New Jersey	W 1–3	Detroit		Howard	20,027	20–9–9	49	Recap

January: 9–3–0 (Home: 4–0–0; Road: 5–3–0)
#	Date	Visitor	Score	Home	OT	Decision	Attendance	Record	Pts	Recap
39	January 3	Detroit	L 1–4	Vancouver		Howard	18,870	20–10–9	49	Recap
40	January 6	Detroit	W 4–2	Edmonton		Howard	16,839	21–10–9	51	Recap
41	January 7	Detroit	W 3–2	Calgary		Mrazek	19,154	22–10–9	53	Recap
42	January 10	Detroit	L 1–3	Washington		Mrazek	18,506	22–11–9	53	Recap
43	January 13	Detroit	W 3–1	Buffalo		Mrazek	19,070	23–11–9	55	Recap
44	January 15	Detroit	W 3–2	St. Louis	OT	Mrazek	18,543	24–11–9	57	Recap
45	January 17	Nashville	W 2–5	Detroit		Mrazek	20,027	25–11–9	59	Recap
46	January 18	Buffalo	W 4–6	Detroit		McCollum	20,027	26–11–9	61	Recap
47	January 20	Minnesota	W 4–5	Detroit	SO	Mrazek	20,027	27–11–9	63	Recap
48	January 27	Detroit	W 5–4	Florida		Mrazek	12,190	28–11–9	65	Recap
49	January 29	Detroit	L 1–5	Tampa Bay		Mrazek	19,204	28–12–9	65	Recap
50	January 31	N.Y. Islanders	W 1–4	Detroit		Mrazek	20,027	29–12–9	67	Recap

February: 6–3–2 (Home: 0–1–1; Road: 6–2–1)
#	Date	Visitor	Score	Home	OT	Decision	Attendance	Record	Pts	Recap
51	February 5	Detroit	W 3–0	Colorado		Mrazek	18,087	30–12–9	69	Recap
52	February 7	Detroit	W 3–1	Arizona		Mrazek	17,125	31–12–9	71	Recap
53	February 11	Detroit	L 1–4	Pittsburgh		Mrazek	18,580	31–13–9	71	Recap
54	February 14	Winnipeg	L 5–4	Detroit	SO	Howard	20,027	31–13–10	72	Recap
55	February 16	Montreal	L 2–0	Detroit		Howard	20,027	31–14–10	72	Recap
56	February 18	Detroit	W 3–2	Chicago	SO	Howard	22,112	32–14–10	74	Recap
57	February 21	Detroit	W 7–6	Dallas	OT	Gustavsson	18,532	33–14–10	76	Recap
58	February 23	Detroit	L 3–4	Anaheim	SO	Howard	17,174	33–14–11	77	Recap
59	February 24	Detroit	L 0–1	Los Angeles		Gustavsson	18,203	33–15–11	77	Recap
60	February 26	Detroit	W 3–2	San Jose		Howard	17,562	34–15–11	79	Recap
61	February 28	Detroit	W 4–3	Nashville		Gustavsson	17,361	35–15–11	81	Recap

March: 5–8–2 (Home: 4–3–2; Road: 0–5–0)
#	Date	Visitor	Score	Home	OT	Decision	Attendance	Record	Pts	Recap
62	March 4	N.Y. Rangers	W 1–2	Detroit	OT	Howard	20,027	36–15–11	83	Recap
63	March 6	Calgary	L 5–2	Detroit		Howard	20,027	36–16–11	83	Recap
64	March 8	Detroit	L 3–5	Boston		Gustavsson	17,565	36–17–11	83	Recap
65	March 9	Edmonton	W 2–5	Detroit		Howard	20,027	37–17–11	85	Recap
66	March 12	Columbus	L 3–1	Detroit		Howard	20,027	37–18–11	85	Recap
67	March 14	Detroit	L 2–7	Philadelphia		Howard	19,701	37–19–11	85	Recap
68	March 15	Detroit	W 5–1	Pittsburgh		Mrazek	18,668	38–19–11	87	Recap
69	March 19	Detroit	L 1–3	Florida		Mrazek	11,458	38–20–11	87	Recap
70	March 20	Detroit	L 1–3	Tampa Bay		Howard	19,204	38–21–11	87	Recap
71	March 22	St. Louis	W 1–2	Detroit	OT	Howard	20,027	39–21–11	89	Recap
72	March 24	Arizona	L 5–4	Detroit	OT	Howard	20,027	39–21–12	90	Recap
73	March 26	San Jose	L 6–4	Detroit		Mrazek	20,027	39–22–12	90	Recap
74	March 28	Tampa Bay	W 0–4	Detroit		Mrazek	20,027	40–22–12	92	Recap
75	March 29	Detroit	L 4–5	N.Y. Islanders		Howard	16,170	40–23–12	92	Recap
76	March 31	Ottawa	L 2–1	Detroit	SO	Mrazek	20,027	40–23–13	93	Recap

April: 3–2–1 (Home: 1–2–0; Road: 2–0–1)
#	Date	Visitor	Score	Home	OT	Decision	Attendance	Record	Pts	Recap
77	April 2	Boston	L 3–2	Detroit		Mrazek	20,027	40–24–13	93	Recap
78	April 4	Detroit	W 3–2	Minnesota	SO	Howard	19,246	41–24–13	95	Recap
79	April 5	Washington	L 2–1	Detroit		Mrazek	20,027	41–25–13	95	Recap
80	April 7	Carolina	W 2–3	Detroit		Howard	20,027	42–25–13	97	Recap
81	April 9	Detroit	L 3–4	Montreal	OT	Howard	21,287	42–25–14	98	Recap
82	April 11	Detroit	W 2–0	Carolina		Mrazek	16,680	43–25–14	100	Recap

Legend: Win (2 points) Loss (0 points) Overtime/shootout loss (1 point)

=== Playoffs ===
2015 Stanley Cup Playoffs

Eastern Conference First Round vs. (A2) Tampa Bay Lightning: Tampa Bay won 4–3
#	Date	Visitor	Score	Home	OT	Decision	Attendance	Series	Recap
1	April 16	Detroit	3–2	Tampa Bay		Mrazek	19,204	1–0	Recap
2	April 18	Detroit	1–5	Tampa Bay		Mrazek	19,204	1–1	Recap
3	April 21	Tampa Bay	0–3	Detroit		Mrazek	20,027	2–1	Recap
4	April 23	Tampa Bay	3–2	Detroit	OT	Mrazek	20,027	2–2	Recap
5	April 25	Detroit	4–0	Tampa Bay		Mrazek	19,204	3–2	Recap
6	April 27	Tampa Bay	5–2	Detroit		Mrazek	20,027	3–3	Recap
7	April 29	Detroit	0–2	Tampa Bay		Mrazek	19,204	3–4	Recap

Legend: Win Loss

== Player statistics ==
Skaters

Regular season
Player	GP	G	A	Pts	+/−	PIM
Henrik Zetterberg	77	17	49	66	−6	32
Pavel Datsyuk	63	26	39	65	12	8
Tomas Tatar	82	29	27	56	6	28
Gustav Nyquist	82	27	27	54	−11	26
Justin Abdelkader	71	23	21	44	3	72
Niklas Kronwall	80	9	35	44	−4	40
Riley Sheahan	79	13	23	36	−3	16
Darren Helm	75	15	18	33	7	12
Danny DeKeyser	80	2	29	31	11	42
Stephen Weiss	52	9	16	25	−2	16
Johan Franzen	33	7	15	22	−12	30
Luke Glendening	82	12	6	18	5	34
Kyle Quincey	73	3	15	18	10	77
Tomas Jurco	63	3	15	18	6	14
Jonathan Ericsson	82	3	12	15	−5	70
Drew Miller	82	5	8	13	−3	25
Jakub Kindl	35	5	8	13	2	22
Brendan Smith	76	4	9	13	−2	68
Marek Zidlicky^{†}	21	3	8	11	−2	14
Teemu Pulkkinen	31	5	3	8	5	10
Joakim Andersson	68	3	5	8	−4	22
Erik Cole^{†}	11	3	3	6	−2	0
Xavier Ouellet	21	2	1	3	4	2
Daniel Cleary	17	1	1	2	−4	6
Alexei Marchenko	13	1	1	2	1	2
Brian Lashoff	11	0	2	2	4	6
Andrej Nestrasil^{‡}	13	0	2	2	−3	4
Landon Ferraro	3	1	0	1	1	0

Playoffs
Player	GP	G	A	Pts	+/−	PIM
Pavel Datsyuk	7	3	2	5	−3	2
Tomas Tatar	7	3	1	4	−3	2
Jonathan Ericsson	7	0	4	4	0	8
Riley Sheahan	7	2	1	3	−1	2
Luke Glendening	7	2	1	3	1	8
Henrik Zetterberg	7	0	3	3	−4	8
Kyle Quincey	7	0	3	3	−1	4
Darren Helm	7	0	3	3	−3	4
Drew Miller	7	1	1	2	−1	2
Joakim Andersson	7	1	1	2	1	2
Gustav Nyquist	7	1	1	2	−2	2
Tomas Jurco	7	1	1	2	−1	2
Niklas Kronwall	6	0	2	2	−1	4
Justin Abdelkader	5	0	2	2	−1	6
Danny DeKeyser	7	1	0	1	−4	12
Stephen Weiss	2	0	0	0	−1	0
Marek Zidlicky	6	0	0	0	0	4
Jakub Kindl	1	0	0	0	−1	0
Brendan Smith	5	0	0	0	1	6
Landon Ferraro	7	0	0	0	−2	2
Alexei Marchenko	3	0	0	0	−3	0

Goaltenders

Regular season
Player	GP	GS	TOI	W	L	OT	GA	GAA	SA	SV%	SO	G	A	PIM
Jimmy Howard	53	50	2971	23	13	11	121	2.44	1350	.910	2	0	1	2
Petr Mrazek	29	26	1585	16	9	2	63	2.38	768	.918	3	0	0	0
Jonas Gustavsson	7	6	351	3	3	1	15	2.56	168	.911	1	0	0	2
Tom McCollum	2	0	66	1	0	0	1	0.91	25	.960	0	0	0	0

Goaltenders

Playoffs
Player	GP	GS	TOI	W	L	GA	GAA	SA	SV%	SO	G	A	PIM
Petr Mrazek	7	7	398	3	4	14	2.11	186	.925	2	0	0	0
Jimmy Howard	1	0	20	0	0	1	3.00	12	.917	0	0	0	0

^{†}Denotes player spent time with another team before joining the Red Wings. Stats reflect time with the Red Wings only.
^{‡}Traded mid-season
Bold/italics denotes franchise record

== Notable achievements ==
=== Awards ===
Regular season
Player	Award	Awarded
Pavel Datsyuk	NHL Second Star of the Week	November 3, 2014
Tomas Tatar	NHL Second Star of the Week	November 24, 2014
Pavel Datsyuk	NHL First Star of the Week	December 8, 2014
Jimmy Howard	NHL All-Star game selection	January 10, 2015
Tomas Tatar	NHL Second Star of the Week	January 19, 2015

=== Milestones ===
Regular season
Player	Milestone	Reached
Andrej Nestrasil	1st Career NHL Game	October 9, 2014
Gustav Nyquist	100th Career NHL Game	October 15, 2014
Niklas Kronwall	600th Career NHL Game	October 21, 2014
Andrej Nestrasil	1st Career NHL Assist; 1st Career NHL Point	October 25, 2014
Darren Helm	300th Career NHL Game	October 29, 2014
Jimmy Howard	300th Career NHL Game	November 18, 2014
Justin Abdelkader	100th Career NHL Point	November 18, 2014
Xavier Ouellet	1st Career NHL Assist; 1st Career NHL Point	November 22, 2014
Stephen Weiss	400th Career NHL Point	November 24, 2014
Xavier Ouellet	1st Career NHL Goal	November 28, 2014
Petr Mrazek	1st Career NHL Shootout Win	November 28, 2014
Mike Babcock	500th Career NHL Win	December 6, 2014
Daniel Cleary	600th Career NHL Game with Detroit	December 13, 2014
Darren Helm	50th Career NHL Goal	December 31, 2014
Henrik Zetterberg	800th Career NHL Game	January 7, 2015
Tom McCollum	1st Career NHL Win	January 18, 2015
Teemu Pulkkinen	1st Career NHL Goal; 1st Career NHL Point	January 20, 2015
Justin Abdelkader	50th Career NHL Goal	February 5, 2015
Gustav Nyquist	100th Career NHL Point	February 5, 2015
Alexei Marchenko	1st Career NHL Point	February 21, 2015
Drew Miller	400th Career NHL Game with Detroit	February 28, 2015
Alexei Marchenko	1st Career NHL Goal	February 28, 2015
Marek Zidlicky	400th Career NHL Point	April 2, 2015
Landon Ferraro	1st Career NHL Goal; 1st Career NHL Point	April 11, 2015

Playoffs
Player	Milestone	Reached
Landon Ferraro	1st Career NHL Playoff Game	April 16, 2015
Alexei Marchenko	1st Career NHL Playoff Game	April 16, 2015
Petr Mrazek	1st Career NHL Playoff Game; 1st Career NHL Playoff Win	April 16, 2015
Tomas Jurco	1st Career NHL Playoff Goal; 1st Career NHL Playoff Point	April 16, 2015
Niklas Kronwall	100th Career NHL Playoff Game	April 18, 2015
Tomas Tatar	1st Career NHL Playoff Goal; 1st Career NHL Playoff Point	April 18, 2015
Riley Sheahan	1st Career NHL Playoff Goal; 1st Career NHL Playoff Point	April 21, 2015
Tomas Tatar	1st Career NHL Playoff Assist	April 21, 2015
Petr Mrazek	1st Career NHL Playoff Shutout	April 21, 2015
Tomas Jurco	1st Career NHL Playoff Assist	April 23, 2015
Riley Sheahan	1st Career NHL Playoff Assist	April 23, 2015

== Transactions ==
The Red Wings have been involved in the following transactions during the 2014–15 season:

=== Trades ===
Date	Details
June 28, 2014	To Columbus Blue Jackets 3rd-round pick in 2014; 3rd-round pick in 2015	To Detroit Red Wings EDM's 3rd-round pick in 2014
March 1, 2015	To Dallas Stars Mattias Backman; Mattias Janmark; 2nd-round pick in 2015	To Detroit Red Wings Erik Cole; Conditional 3rd-round pick in 2015
March 2, 2015	To New Jersey Devils Conditional 3rd-round pick in 2016	To Detroit Red Wings Marek Zidlicky

=== Free agents acquired ===
Date	Player	Former team	Contract terms (in U.S. dollars)	Ref
July 1, 2014	Kevin Porter	Buffalo Sabres	1 year, $600,000	
July 1, 2014	Andy Miele	Phoenix Coyotes	1 year, $600,000	

=== Free agents lost ===
Date	Player	New team	Contract terms (in U.S. dollars)	Ref
July 1, 2014	Cory Emmerton	Sochinskiye Leopardy (KHL)	1 year	
July 1, 2014	David Legwand	Ottawa Senators	2 years, $6 million	
October 7, 2014	Jordin Tootoo	New Jersey Devils	1 year, $550,000	

=== Lost via waivers ===
Player	New team	Date claimed off waivers	Ref
Andrej Nestrasil	Carolina Hurricanes	November 20, 2014	

=== Player signings ===
Date	Player	Contract terms (in U.S. dollars)	Ref
June 27, 2014	Jonas Gustavsson	1 year, $1.85 million contract extension	
July 1, 2014	Riley Sheahan	2 years, $1.9 million contract extension	
July 1, 2014	Petr Mrazek	1 year, $737,500 contract extension	
July 2, 2014	Kyle Quincey	2 years, $8.5 million	
July 10, 2014	Daniel Cleary	1 year, $1.5 million	
July 11, 2014	Tom McCollum	1 year, $600,000	
July 17, 2014	Mitch Callahan	1 year, $555,000	
July 17, 2014	Andrej Nestrasil	1 year, $550,000	
July 25, 2014	Landon Ferraro	1 year, $550,000	
July 28, 2014	Tomas Tatar	3 years, $8.25 million	
September 16, 2014	Danny DeKeyser	2 years, $4.375 million	
September 24, 2014	Joe Hicketts	3 years, entry-level contract	
October 17, 2014	Tyler Bertuzzi	3 years, entry-level contract	
May 9, 2015	Dominic Turgeon	3 years, entry-level contract	
May 21, 2015	Dylan Larkin	3 years, entry-level contract	
June 15, 2015	Axel Holmstrom	3 years, entry-level contract	

=== Suspensions/fines ===
Player	Explanation	Length	Salary	Date issued
Gustav Nyquist	Diving/Embellishment during NHL Game No. 529 in Boston on Monday, December 29, 2014, at 15:55 of the second period.	—	$2,000.00	January 7, 2015
Niklas Kronwall	Charging Tampa Bay Lightning forward Nikita Kucherov during Game Six of the First Round of the Eastern Conference series in Detroit on Monday, April 27, 2015, at 18:55 of the second period.	1 game	N/A	April 28, 2015

== Draft picks ==
The 2014 NHL entry draft was held on June 27–28, 2014 at the Wells Fargo Center in Philadelphia, Pennsylvania.

Round	#	Player	Pos	Nationality	College/Junior/Club team (League)
1	15	Dylan Larkin	C	United States	USA U-18 (USHL)
3	63	Dominic Turgeon	C	United States	Portland Winterhawks (WHL)
4	106	Christoffer Ehn	C	Sweden	Frölunda HC (J20 SuperElit)
5	136	Chase Perry	G	United States	Wenatchee Wild (NAHL)
6	166	Julius Vahatalo	LW	Finland	HC TPS (SM-liiga)
7	196	Axel Holmstrom	C	Sweden	Skellefteå AIK (SHL)
7	201^{[a]}	Alexander Kadeikin	C	Russia	Atlant Moscow Oblast (KHL)

Draft notes

- Detroit's second-round pick will go to the Nashville Predators, as the result of a trade on March 5, 2014, that sent David Legwand to Detroit, in exchange for Patrick Eaves, Calle Jarnkrok, and this pick (being conditional at the time of the trade). The condition – Nashville will receive a second-round pick in 2014 if Detroit qualifies for the 2014 Stanley Cup playoffs – was converted on April 9, 2014.
- ^{a} San Jose's seventh-round pick will go to Detroit, as the result of a trade on June 10, 2012, that sent Brad Stuart to San Jose, in exchange for Andrew Murray and this pick (being conditional at the time of the trade). The condition – Stuart is re-signed by San Jose for the 2012–13 season – was converted on June 18, 2012.
