= Peter Horachek =

Canadian ice hockey player and coach

Peter Horachek (born January 26, 1960) is currently a pro scout for the New Jersey Devils of the National Hockey League (NHL). Horachek was previously a long-time assistant coach for the Nashville Predators, as well as the interim head coach of the Florida Panthers and the Toronto Maple Leafs.

== Career ==
Horachek played junior hockey with the Oshawa Generals. Although he was not selected in an NHL entry draft, he signed a minor league contract with the Rochester Americans and had a long career in the American Hockey League (AHL) and International Hockey League (IHL). He later played with the Flint Generals, where he scored a career-high 86 points in 1984, and with the Flint Spirits. He began his coaching career when he was promoted to serve as an assistant during his final campaign with the Spirits.

Horachek started the 2013–14 season as head coach of the San Antonio Rampage, the AHL affiliate of the NHL's Florida Panthers. On November 8, 2013, he was named the Panthers' interim head coach, replacing Kevin Dineen. On April 29, 2014, Panthers general manager Dale Tallon announced the team had fired Horachek, who would not remain with the organization.

Horachek was appointed as an assistant coach of the Toronto Maple Leafs on July 11, 2014, and named him the interim head coach of the team on January 7, 2015, after Randy Carlyle was fired from the position. On January 9, 2015, Horachek was named head coach of Toronto for the remainder of the 2014–15 season. Under his direction, Toronto recorded a 9–28–5 record in 42 games as the team struggled throughout the second half of the season, resulting in a 15th-place finish in the Eastern Conference. Horachek was fired on April 12, 2015, one day after the 2014–15 regular season ended, along with general manager Dave Nonis, assistant coaches Steve Spott and Chris Denis and goaltending coach Rick St. Croix.

== NHL coaching record ==
| Team | Year | Regular Season | | | | | | | Post Season | | |
| Team | Year | Games | Won | Lost | OT/SO | Points | Win % | Finish | Won | Lost | Result |
|---|---|---|---|---|---|---|---|---|---|---|---|
| FLA | 2013–14 | 66 | 26 | 36 | 4 | 56 | 39.4% | 7th in Atlantic | - | - | Missed playoffs |
| TOR | 2014–15 | 42 | 9 | 28 | 5 | 23 | 21.4% | 7th in Atlantic | - | - | Missed playoffs |
| Total | | 108 | 35 | 64 | 9 | | | | | | |

== See also ==
- List of NHL head coaches

| Preceded by Kevin Dineen | Interim Head coach of the Florida Panthers; 2013–14 | Succeeded by Gerard Gallant |
| Preceded by Randy Carlyle | Interim Head coach of the Toronto Maple Leafs; 2015 | Succeeded by Mike Babcock |
