= 2014–15 Minnesota Wild season =

2014–15 Minnesota Wild
- Division: 4th Central
- Conference: 6th Western
- 2014–15 record: 46–28–8
- Home record: 22–13–6
- Road record: 24–15–2
- Goals for: 231
- Goals against: 201

Team information
- General manager: Chuck Fletcher
- Coach: Mike Yeo
- Captain: Mikko Koivu
- Alternate captains: Zack Parise; Ryan Suter
- Arena: Xcel Energy Center
- Average attendance: 19,023 (106.0%) (41 games)

Team leaders
- Goals: Zach Parise (33)
- Assists: Jason Pominville; Ryan Suter (36)
- Points: Zach Parise (62)
- Penalty minutes: Marco Scandella (56)
- Plus/minus: Jonas Brodin; Zach Parise (+21)
- Wins: Devan Dubnyk (27)
- Goals against average: Devan Dubnyk (1.78)

The 2014–15 Minnesota Wild season was the 15th season for the National Hockey League (NHL) franchise that was established on June 25, 1997.

== Off-season ==
Following the team's 4–2 Western Conference semifinals loss to the Chicago Blackhawks, General Manager Chuck Fletcher was tasked with deciding how to deal with the Wild's 21 free-agents, including 13 unrestricted and nine restricted free agents. The contract situation for all players, including UFAs Dany Heatley, Cody McCormick, Matt Moulson and Nate Prosser, needed to be decided before heading into the NHL's free agency period beginning on July 1, 2014.

== Playoffs ==
The Minnesota Wild entered the playoffs as the Western Conference's first wild-card. After defeating the St. Louis Blues 4–2 in the first round, they advanced to the second round, where they were swept by the Chicago Blackhawks for the third-straight season.

== Standings ==
Central Division
Pos	Team	GP	W	L	OTL	ROW	GF	GA	GD	Pts
1	y – St. Louis Blues	82	51	24	7	42	248	201	+47	109
2	x – Nashville Predators	82	47	25	10	41	232	208	+24	104
3	x – Chicago Blackhawks	82	48	28	6	39	229	189	+40	102
4	x – Minnesota Wild	82	46	28	8	42	231	201	+30	100
5	x – Winnipeg Jets	82	43	26	13	36	230	210	+20	99
6	Dallas Stars	82	41	31	10	37	261	260	+1	92
7	Colorado Avalanche	82	39	31	12	29	219	227	−8	90

Source: National Hockey League
x – Clinched playoff spot; y – Clinched division

Western Conference Wild Card
Pos	Div	Team	GP	W	L	OTL	ROW	GF	GA	GD	Pts
1	CE	x – Minnesota Wild	82	46	28	8	42	231	201	+30	100
2	CE	x – Winnipeg Jets	82	43	26	13	36	230	210	+20	99
3	PA	Los Angeles Kings	82	40	27	15	38	220	205	+15	95
4	CE	Dallas Stars	82	41	31	10	37	261	260	+1	92
5	CE	Colorado Avalanche	82	39	31	12	29	219	227	−8	90
6	PA	San Jose Sharks	82	40	33	9	36	228	232	−4	89
7	PA	Edmonton Oilers	82	24	44	14	19	198	283	−85	62
8	PA	Arizona Coyotes	82	24	50	8	19	170	272	−102	56

Source: National Hockey League
x – Clinched playoff spot

== Suspensions/fines ==
Player	Explanation	Length	Salary	Date issued
Marco Scandella	Illegal check to the head of St. Louis Blues forward T. J. Oshie during NHL Game No. 351 in St. Paul on Saturday, November 29, 2014, at 8:45 of the first period.	—	$2,755.38	December 1, 2014
Marco Scandella	Illegal check to the head of New York Islanders forward Brock Nelson during NHL Game No. 415 in St. Paul on Tuesday, December 9, 2014, at 17:32 of the third period.	2 games (1–1 in absence)	$11,021.50	December 10, 2014
Ryan Suter	Elbowing Pittsburgh Penguins forward Steve Downie during NHL Game No. 633 in Pittsburgh on Tuesday, January 13, 2015, at 4:22 of the second period.	2 games (2–0 in absence)	$81,058.72	January 14, 2015

== Schedule and results ==
=== Pre-season ===
2014 preseason game log: 3–2–1 (Home: 3–0–0; Road: 0–2–1)
#	Date	Visitor	Score	Home	OT	Decision	Attendance	Record	Recap
1	September 22	Minnesota	1–2	Winnipeg		Bryzgalov	14,448	0–1–0
2	September 25	Minnesota	2–3	Pittsburgh	OT	Bryzgalov	17,858	0–1–1
3	September 27	Winnipeg	3–4	Minnesota		Backstrom	16,822	1–1–1
4	September 29	Pittsburgh	1–4	Minnesota		Kuemper	16,106	2–1–1
5	October 2	Minnesota	1–4	St. Louis		Backstrom	12,103	2–2–1
6	October 4	St. Louis	4–5	Minnesota	OT	Kuemper	17,342	3–2–1

=== Regular season ===
2014–15 Game Log

October: 6–3–0 (Home: 4–0–0; Road: 2–3–0)
#	Date	Visitor	Score	Home	OT	Decision	Attendance	Record	Pts	Recap
1	October 9	Colorado	0–5	Minnesota		Kuemper	19,098	1–0–0	2
2	October 11	Minnesota	3–0	Colorado		Kuemper	18,139	2–0–0	4
3	October 17	Minnesota	1–2	Anaheim		Kuemper	17,306	2–1–0	4
4	October 19	Minnesota	1–2	Los Angeles		Backstrom	18,230	2–2–0	4
5	October 23	Arizona	0–2	Minnesota		Kuemper	18,554	3–2–0	6
6	October 25	Tampa Bay	2–7	Minnesota		Kuemper	18,884	4–2–0	8
7	October 27	Minnesota	4–5	NY Rangers		Kuemper	18,006	4–3–0	8
8	October 28	Minnesota	4–3	Boston		Backstrom	17,565	5–3–0	10
9	October 30	San Jose	3–4	Minnesota	SO	Kuemper	18,633	6–3–0	12

November: 7–6–1 (Home: 3–2–1; Road: 4–4–0)
#	Date	Visitor	Score	Home	OT	Decision	Attendance	Record	Pts	Recap
10	November 1	Dallas	1–4	Minnesota		Kuemper	19,088	7–3–0	14
11	November 4	Pittsburgh	4–1	Minnesota		Kuemper	18,788	7–4–0	14
12	November 6	Minnesota	0–3	Ottawa		Backstrom	16,867	7–5–0	14
13	November 8	Minnesota	1–4	Montreal		Kuemper	21,287	7–6–0	14
14	November 11	Minnesota	1–3	New Jersey		Kuemper	14,256	7–7–0	14
15	November 13	Buffalo	3–6	Minnesota		Backstrom	18,925	8–7–0	16
16	November 15	Minnesota	2–1	Dallas		Kuemper	17,543	9–7–0	18
17	November 16	Winnipeg	3–4	Minnesota	OT	Kuemper	18,808	10–7–0	20
18	November 20	Minnesota	3–2	Philadelphia		Kuemper	19,919	11–7–0	22
19	November 22	Minnesota	1–2	Tampa Bay		Kuemper	19,204	11–8–0	22
20	November 24	Minnesota	4–1	Florida		Backstrom	8,426	12–8–0	24
21	November 26	Los Angeles	4–0	Minnesota		Kuemper	19,038	12–9–0	24
22	November 28	Minnesota	5–4	Dallas	OT	Kuemper	18,532	13–9–0	26
23	November 29	St. Louis	3–2	Minnesota	SO	Backstrom	19,124	13–9–1	27

December: 4–5–3 (Home: 2–2–3; Road: 2–3–0)
#	Date	Visitor	Score	Home	OT	Decision	Attendance	Record	Pts	Recap
24	December 3	Montreal	1–2	Minnesota		Kuemper	19,034	14–9–1	29
25	December 5	Anaheim	5–4	Minnesota		Kuemper	19,044	14–10–1	29
26	December 9	NY Islanders	4–5	Minnesota		Backstrom	18,904	15–10–1	31
27	December 11	Minnesota	1–2	San Jose		Kuemper	17,097	15–11–1	31
28	December 13	Minnesota	4–3	Arizona	SO	Backstrom	13,975	16–11–1	33
29	December 16	Minnesota	3–5	Chicago		Backstrom	21,472	16–12–1	33
30	December 17	Boston	3–2	Minnesota	OT	Backstrom	18,841	16–12–2	34
31	December 20	Nashville	6–5	Minnesota	OT	Backstrom	19,017	16–12–3	35
32	December 23	Philadelphia	5–2	Minnesota		Kuemper	19,020	16–13–3	35
33	December 27	Winnipeg	4–3	Minnesota	OT	Curry	19,177	16–13–4	36
34	December 29	Minnesota	3–2	Winnipeg		Kuemper	15,016	17–13–4	38
35	December 31	Minnesota	1–3	Columbus		Kuemper	18,040	17–14–4	38

January: 5–6–2 (Home: 2–3–1; Road: 3–3–1)
#	Date	Visitor	Score	Home	OT	Decision	Attendance	Record	Pts	Recap
36	January 2	Toronto	1–3	Minnesota		Kuemper	19,168	18–14–4	40
37	January 3	Minnesota	1–7	Dallas		Kuemper	18,532	18–15–4	40
38	January 6	San Jose	4–3	Minnesota	OT	Kuemper	19,043	18–15–5	41
39	January 8	Chicago	4–2	Minnesota		Backstrom	19,060	18–16–5	41
40	January 10	Nashville	3–1	Minnesota		Backstrom	19,052	18–17–5	41
41	January 11	Minnesota	1–4	Chicago		Backstrom	21,809	18–18–5	41
42	January 13	Minnesota	2–7	Pittsburgh		Backstrom	18,642	18–19–5	41
43	January 15	Minnesota	7–0	Buffalo		Dubnyk	18,963	19–19–5	43
44	January 17	Arizona	1–3	Minnesota		Dubnyk	19,111	20–19–5	45
45	January 19	Columbus	3–1	Minnesota		Dubnyk	19,064	20–20–5	45
46	January 20	Minnesota	4–5	Detroit	SO	Kuemper	20,027	20–20–6	46
47	January 27	Minnesota	2–1	Edmonton		Dubnyk	16,839	21–20–6	48
48	January 29	Minnesota	1–0	Calgary		Dubnyk	19,289	22–20–6	50

February: 11–2–1 (Home: 6–1–0; Road: 5–1–1)
#	Date	Visitor	Score	Home	OT	Decision	Attendance	Record	Pts	Recap
49	February 1	Minnesota	4–2	Vancouver		Dubnyk	18,438	23–20–6	52
50	February 3	Chicago	0–3	Minnesota		Dubnyk	19,104	24–20–6	54
51	February 7	Colorado	0–1	Minnesota		Dubnyk	19,244	25–20–6	56
52	February 9	Vancouver	3–5	Minnesota		Dubnyk	18,804	26–20–6	58
53	February 10	Minnesota	1–2	Winnipeg	OT	Dubnyk	15,016	26–20–7	59
54	February 12	Florida	1–2	Minnesota		Dubnyk	19,055	27–20–7	61
55	February 14	Carolina	3–6	Minnesota		Dubnyk	19,220	28–20–7	63
56	February 16	Minnesota	2–3	Vancouver		Dubnyk	18,465	28–21–7	63
57	February 18	Minnesota	3–2	Calgary	OT	Dubnyk	19,277	29–21–7	65
58	February 20	Minnesota	4–0	Edmonton		Dubnyk	16,839	30–21–7	67
59	February 22	Dallas	2–6	Minnesota		Dubnyk	18,754	31–21–7	69
60	February 24	Edmonton	2–1	Minnesota		Dubnyk	19,044	31–22–7	69
61	February 26	Minnesota	4–2	Nashville		Dubnyk	17,113	32–22–7	71
62	February 28	Minnesota	3–1	Colorado		Dubnyk	18,087	33–22–7	73

March: 11–3–0 (Home: 5–3–0; Road: 6–0–0)
#	Date	Visitor	Score	Home	OT	Decision	Attendance	Record	Pts	Recap
63	March 3	Ottawa	2–3	Minnesota	SO	Dubnyk	19,054	34–22–7	75
64	March 5	Minnesota	2–1	Washington		Dubnyk	18,506	35–22–7	77
65	March 6	Minnesota	3–1	Carolina		Dubnyk	10,857	36–22–7	79
66	March 8	Colorado	3–2	Minnesota		Dubnyk	19,119	36–23–7	79
67	March 10	New Jersey	2–6	Minnesota		Dubnyk	19,034	37–23–7	81
68	March 13	Anaheim	2–1	Minnesota		Dubnyk	19,045	37–24–7	81
69	March 14	Minnesota	3–1	St. Louis		Dubnyk	19,638	38–24–7	83
70	March 17	Minnesota	3–2	Nashville	OT	Dubnyk	17,209	39–24–7	85
71	March 19	Washington	3–2	Minnesota		Dubnyk	19,044	39–25–7	85
72	March 21	St. Louis	3–6	Minnesota		Dubnyk	19,204	40–25–7	87
73	March 23	Minnesota	2–1	Toronto		Dubnyk	18,366	41–25–7	89
74	March 24	Minnesota	2–1	NY Islanders	SO	Dubnyk	16,170	42–25–7	91
75	March 27	Calgary	2–4	Minnesota		Dubnyk	19,040	43–25–7	93
76	March 28	Los Angeles	1–4	Minnesota		Dubnyk	19,204	44–25–7	95

April: 2–3–1 (Home: 0–2–1; Road: 2–1–0)
#	Date	Visitor	Score	Home	OT	Decision	Attendance	Record	Pts	Recap
77	April 2	NY Rangers	3–2	Minnesota		Dubnyk	19,244	44–26–7	95
78	April 4	Detroit	3–2	Minnesota	SO	Dubnyk	19,246	44–26–8	96
79	April 6	Winnipeg	2–0	Minnesota		Dubnyk	19,010	44–27–8	96
80	April 7	Minnesota	2–1	Chicago		Dubnyk	21,851	45–27–8	98
81	April 9	Minnesota	4–2	Nashville		Kuemper	17,236	46–27–8	100
82	April 11	Minnesota	2–4	St. Louis		Dubnyk	19,155	46–28–8	100

Legend: Win (2 points) Loss (0 points) Overtime/shootout loss (1 point)

=== Playoffs ===
2015 Stanley Cup Playoffs

Western Conference first round vs. (C1) St. Louis Blues: Minnesota wins 4–2
#	Date	Visitor	Score	Home	OT	Decision	Attendance	Series	Recap
1	April 16	Minnesota	4–2	St. Louis		Dubnyk	19,671	1–0	Recap
2	April 18	Minnesota	1–4	St. Louis		Dubnyk	19,243	1–1	Recap
3	April 20	St. Louis	0–3	Minnesota		Dubnyk	19,165	2–1	Recap
4	April 22	St. Louis	6–1	Minnesota		Dubnyk	19,390	2–2	Recap
5	April 24	Minnesota	4–1	St. Louis		Dubnyk	19,653	3–2	Recap
6	April 26	St. Louis	1–4	Minnesota		Dubnyk	19,318	4–2	Recap

Western Conference second round vs. (C3) Chicago Blackhawks: Chicago wins 4–0
#	Date	Visitor	Score	Home	OT	Decision	Attendance	Series	Recap
1	May 1	Minnesota	3–4	Chicago		Dubnyk	21,851	0–1	Recap
2	May 3	Minnesota	1–4	Chicago		Dubnyk	21,934	0–2	Recap
3	May 5	Chicago	1–0	Minnesota		Dubnyk	19,349	0–3	Recap
4	May 7	Chicago	4–3	Minnesota		Dubnyk	19,163	0–4	Recap

Legend: Win Loss

== Player statistics ==
Final stats

Skaters

Regular season
Player	GP	G	A	Pts	+/−	PIM
Zach Parise	74	33	29	62	21	41
Jason Pominville	82	18	36	54	9	8
Thomas Vanek	80	21	31	52	−6	37
Mikko Koivu	80	14	34	48	2	38
Mikael Granlund	68	8	31	39	17	20
Ryan Suter	77	2	36	38	7	48
Nino Niederreiter	80	24	13	37	2	28
Charlie Coyle	82	11	24	35	13	39
Justin Fontaine	71	9	22	31	13	12
Jason Zucker	51	21	5	26	−9	18
Jared Spurgeon	66	9	16	25	3	6
Marco Scandella	64	11	12	23	8	56
Kyle Brodziak	73	9	11	20	−6	47
Jonas Brodin	71	3	14	17	21	8
Matt Dumba	58	8	8	16	13	23
Erik Haula	72	7	7	14	−7	32
Ryan Carter	53	3	10	13	3	55
Chris Stewart^{†}	20	3	8	11	4	25
Matt Cooke	29	4	6	10	0	13
Christian Folin	40	2	8	10	3	13
Jordan Schroeder	25	3	5	8	9	2
Nate Prosser	63	2	5	7	−1	32
Brett Sutter	6	0	3	3	1	4
Stephane Veilleux	12	1	1	2	0	10
Sean Bergenheim^{†}	17	1	0	1	−4	6
Jordan Leopold^{†}	18	0	1	1	1	8
Keith Ballard	14	0	1	1	−3	26
Jonathon Blum	4	0	1	1	−3	2
Stu Bickel	9	0	1	1	1	46
Tyler Graovac	3	0	0	0	0	0
Justin Falk^{‡}	13	0	0	0	−6	7

Playoffs
Player	GP	G	A	Pts	+/−	PIM
Zach Parise	10	4	6	10	0	4
Jason Pominville	10	3	3	6	−1	0
Mikael Granlund	10	2	4	6	2	0
Nino Niederreiter	10	4	1	5	−2	10
Matt Dumba	10	2	2	4	−1	2
Jared Spurgeon	10	1	3	4	0	4
Mikko Koivu	10	1	3	4	−4	2
Thomas Vanek	10	0	4	4	−7	2
Marco Scandella	10	2	1	3	4	0
Jason Zucker	10	2	1	3	−1	2
Ryan Suter	10	0	3	3	−8	0
Charlie Coyle	10	1	1	2	−3	0
Justin Fontaine	6	1	1	2	0	2
Matt Cooke	7	0	2	2	1	4
Chris Stewart	8	0	2	2	−3	2
Erik Haula	2	1	0	1	1	0
Jordan Leopold	9	0	0	0	−3	0
Sean Bergenheim	3	0	0	0	−2	0
Kyle Brodziak	10	0	0	0	−3	2
Ryan Carter	1	0	0	0	0	0
Jordan Schroeder	3	0	0	0	0	0
Nate Prosser	1	0	0	0	−1	2
Jonas Brodin	10	0	0	0	−2	0

Goaltenders

Regular season
Player	GP	GS	TOI	W	L	OT	GA	GAA	SA	SV%	SO	G	A	PIM
Devan Dubnyk^{†}	39	39	2293	27	9	2	68	1.78	1064	.936	5	0	2	2
Darcy Kuemper	31	28	1569	14	12	2	68	2.60	718	.905	3	0	0	0
Niklas Backstrom	19	14	1005	5	7	3	51	3.04	452	.887	0	0	0	2
John Curry	2	1	72	0	0	1	5	4.17	25	.800	0	0	0	0

Playoffs
Player	GP	GS	TOI	W	L	GA	GAA	SA	SV%	SO	G	A	PIM
Devan Dubnyk	10	10	570	4	6	24	2.53	260	.908	1	0	1	0
Darcy Kuemper	1	0	23	0	0	0	0.00	9	1.000	0	0	0	0

^{†}Denotes player spent time with another team before joining the Wild. Stats reflect time with the Wild only.
^{‡}Traded mid-season

== Notable achievements ==
=== Awards ===
Regular season
Player	Award	Awarded
D. Kuemper	NHL Second Star of the Week	October 13, 2014
R. Suter	NHL Second Star of the Week	December 15, 2014
R. Suter	NHL All-Star game selection	January 10, 2015
Z. Parise	NHL Third Star of the Week	January 26, 2015
D. Dubnyk	NHL Third Star of the Week	February 2, 2015
D. Dubnyk	NHL First Star of the Week	February 9, 2015
D. Dubnyk	NHL First Star of the Month	March 1, 2015
D. Dubnyk	NHL First Star of the Week	March 30, 2015
D. Dubnyk	NHL Third Star of the Month	April 1, 2015

=== Milestones ===
Regular season
Player	Milestone	Reached
M. Granlund	100th Career NHL Game	November 1, 2014
N. Niederreiter	1st Career NHL Hat Trick	November 13, 2014
K. Ballard	600th Career NHL Game	November 26, 2014
N. Backstrom	400th Career NHL Game	December 9, 2014
C. Folin	1st Career NHL Goal	December 11, 2014
J. Pominville	700th Career NHL Game	December 17, 2014
R. Suter	700th Career NHL Game	December 17, 2014
T. Graovac	1st Career NHL Game	December 29, 2014
T. Vanek	700th Career NHL Game	January 3, 2015
J. Fontaine	100th Career NHL Game	January 8, 2015
M. Scandella	200th Career NHL Game	January 17, 2015
R. Carter	400th Career NHL Game	January 17, 2015
T. Vanek	300th Career NHL Assist	January 29, 2015
D. Dubnyk	200th Career NHL Game	February 3, 2015
S. Veilleux	500th Career NHL Game	February 12, 2015
N. Niederreiter	200th Career NHL Game	February 14, 2015
K. Brodziak	600th Career NHL Game	February 20, 2015
E. Haula	100th Career NHL Game	February 26, 2015
S. Bergenheim	500th Career NHL Game	March 27, 2015
J. Spurgeon	100th Career NHL Point	March 27, 2015
T. Vanek	600th Career NHL Point	March 14, 2015
D. Dubnyk	38th Consecutive Start (Wild franchise record)	April 7, 2015
M. Koivu	500th Career NHL Point	April 9, 2015

Playoffs
Player	Milestone	Reached
D. Dubnyk	1st Career Playoff Game; 1st Career Playoff Win	April 16, 2015
M. Dumba	1st Career Playoff Game; 1st Career Playoff Goal; 1st Career Playoff Point	April 16, 2015
J. Schroeder	1st Career Playoff Game	April 18, 2015
D. Dubnyk	1st Career Playoff Shutout	April 20, 2015

== Transactions ==
The Wild have been involved in the following transactions during the 2014–15 season.

=== Trades ===
Date	Details
June 28, 2014	To Tampa Bay Lightning 3rd-round pick in 2014	To Minnesota Wild 3rd-round pick in 2014; 7th-round pick in 2015
January 14, 2015	To Arizona Coyotes 3rd-round pick in 2015	To Minnesota Wild Devan Dubnyk
February 24, 2015	To Florida Panthers 3rd-round pick in 2016	To Minnesota Wild Sean Bergenheim; 7th-round pick in 2016
March 2, 2015	To Columbus Blue Jackets Justin Falk; 5th-round pick in 2015	To Minnesota Wild Jordan Leopold
March 2, 2015	To Buffalo Sabres 2nd-round pick in 2017	To Minnesota Wild Chris Stewart
March 2, 2015	To Boston Bruins Zack Phillips	To Minnesota Wild Jared Knight

=== Free agents acquired ===
Date	Player	Former team	Contract terms (in U.S. dollars)	Ref
July 1, 2014	Thomas Vanek	Montreal Canadiens	3 years, $19.5 million	
July 1, 2014	Stu Bickel	Hartford Wolf Pack	1 year, $600,000	
July 1, 2014	Brett Sutter	Carolina Hurricanes	2 years, $1.2 million	
July 1, 2014	Guillaume Gelinas	Val-d'Or Foreurs	3 year, $1.79 million entry-level contract	
July 2, 2014	Joel Rechlicz	Washington Capitals	1 year, $600,000	
July 9, 2014	Cody Almond	Geneve-Servette HC	1 year, $550,000	
July 11, 2014	Jordan Schroeder	Vancouver Canucks	2 years, $1.2 million	
August 1, 2014	Justin Falk	New York Rangers	1 year, $700,000	
September 23, 2014	Alex Gudbranson	Sault Ste. Marie Greyhounds	3 years, entry-level contract	
September 23, 2014	Hunter Warner	Fargo Force	3 years, entry-level contract	
October 6, 2014	Ryan Carter	New Jersey Devils	1 year, $725,000	
March 24, 2015	Grayson Downing	University of New Hampshire	2 years, entry-level contract	
March 30, 2015	Brody Hoffman	University of Vermont	entry-level contract	
March 30, 2015	Zach Palmquist	Minnesota State University, Mankato	entry-level contract	

=== Free agents lost ===
Date	Player	New team	Contract terms (in U.S. dollars)	Ref
July 1, 2014	Clayton Stoner	Anaheim Ducks	4 years, $13 million	
July 1, 2014	Cody McCormick	Buffalo Sabres	3 years, $4.5 million	
July 1, 2014	Matt Moulson	Buffalo Sabres	5 years, $25 million	
July 1, 2014	Jon Landry	Washington Capitals	1 year, $550,000	
July 1, 2014	Steven Kampfer	New York Rangers	1 year, $550,000	
July 9, 2014	Dany Heatley	Anaheim Ducks	1 year, $1 million	
July 21, 2014	Nate Prosser	St. Louis Blues	1 year, $700,000	
December 9, 2014	Ilya Bryzgalov	Anaheim Ducks	1 year, $2.88 million	

=== Claimed via waivers ===
Player	Former team	Date claimed off waivers	Ref
Nate Prosser	St. Louis Blues	October 2, 2014	

=== Player signings ===
Date	Player	Contract terms (in U.S. dollars)	Ref
July 11, 2014	Jonathon Blum	1 year, $675,000	
July 15, 2014	Jason Zucker	2 years, $1,800,500	
July 17, 2014	John Curry	1 year, $575,000	
July 29, 2014	Justin Fontaine	2 years, $2 million	
September 11, 2014	Nino Niederreiter	3 years, $8 million	
October 12, 2014	Jonas Brodin	6 years, $25 million (extension)	
October 22, 2014	Charlie Coyle	5 years, $16 million (extension)	
April 9, 2015	Dylan Labbe	3 years, entry-level contract	
May 4, 2015	Pavel Jenys	3 years, entry-level contract	
May 22, 2015	Michael Keranen	1 year	

== Draft picks ==
Below are the Minnesota Wild's selections made at the 2014 NHL entry draft, held on June 27–28, 2014 at the Wells Fargo Center in Philadelphia, Pennsylvania.

Round	#	Player	Pos	Nationality	College/Junior/Club team (League)
1	18	Alex Tuch	RW	United States	U.S. National Team Development Program (USHL)
3	80	Louis Belpedio	D	United States	U.S. National Team Development Program (USHL)
4	109	Kaapo Kahkonen	G	Finland	Espoo Blues (Liiga)
5	139	Tanner Faith	D	Canada	Kootenay Ice (WHL)
6	160^{[a]}	Pontus Sjalin	D	Sweden	Ostersunds IK (J20 Elit)
6	167^{[b]}	Chase Lang	C	Canada	Calgary Hitmen (WHL)
6	169	Reid Duke	C	Canada	Lethbridge Hurricanes (WHL)
7	199	Pavel Jenys	C	Czech Republic	Kometa Brno (Czrep)

Draft notes

- The Minnesota Wild's second-round pick went to the Buffalo Sabres as the result of trade on April 3, 2013 that sent Jason Pominville, and a fourth-round pick in 2014 to Minnesota in exchange for Matt Hackett, Johan Larsson, a first-round pick in 2013 and this pick.
- ^{a} The Ottawa Senators' sixth-round pick went to Minnesota as the result of a trade on March 12, 2013 that sent Matt Kassian to Ottawa in exchange for this pick.
- ^{b} The Columbus Blue Jackets' sixth-round pick (previously acquired by the New York Rangers) went to Minnesota as the result of a trade on June 30, 2013 that sent Justin Falk to the Rangers in exchange for Benn Ferriero, and this pick.
