= Steve Spott =

Canadian ice hockey coach (born 1968)

- Born: May 18, 1968 (age 58) Toronto, Ontario, Canada
- Current NHL coach: Boston Bruins (assistant)
- Coached for: Vegas Golden Knights; Dallas Stars; San Jose Sharks; Toronto Maple Leafs

Steve Spott (born May 18, 1968) is a Canadian professional ice hockey assistant coach for the Boston Bruins of the National Hockey League (NHL). He previously served as an assistant coach for the Vegas Golden Knights, Dallas Stars, San Jose Sharks, and Toronto Maple Leafs. Spott also worked as the head coach of the Ontario Hockey League's (OHL) Kitchener Rangers from 2008 until 2013. In July 2013, he was announced as the head coach of the Toronto Marlies of the American Hockey League. He would be promoted to the Maple Leafs as an assistant coach due to his success at leading the Marlies to the AHL's Western Conference Finals.

Spott earned his teaching degree at Colgate University and worked as a physical education teacher at Mary Ward Catholic Secondary School before turning to coaching.

== Playing career ==
Spott played NCAA hockey with Colgate University from 1986–1990, as he helped the team win the ECAC Hockey championship in 1990 as Colgate defeated Rensselaer Polytechnic Institute 5–4 to win the Whitelaw Cup. Colgate then went on to the NCAA Men's Ice Hockey Championship sweeping Lake Superior State University in a best of 3 Quarterfinal Series by the scores of 3–2 and 2–1. Spott scored the winning goal in Game 2, propelling Colgate University to its first ever NCAA Frozen Four. At the NCAA Frozen Four, Colgate defeated Boston University in the semifinals 3–2, however, Colgate lost to the University of Wisconsin–Madison in the final game played at Joe Louis Arena in Detroit, Michigan.

After college hockey, Spott turned pro. He started the 1990–91 season with a record short try-out in the Swedish Division 1 Club Tingsryds AIF which he ended after "feeling homesick" after less than one week. After returning to Canada from Sweden he spent the 1990–91 season with the Richmond Renegades of the East Coast Hockey League and the Newmarket Saints of the American Hockey League. Spott played with the Heerenveen Flyers of the Eredivisie in the Netherlands for the 1991–92 season before retiring.

== Coaching career ==
=== Junior ===
Spott was selected OCAA Coach of the Year in 1994–95 with Seneca College, and then spent the time coaching the Markham Waxers of the Metro Junior A Hockey League before landing his first Ontario Hockey League job as an assistant coach of the Plymouth Whalers from 1997–2001, which is where he first worked with Whalers head coach Peter DeBoer. In 2001, both DeBoer and Spott would leave the Whalers and move to the Kitchener Rangers, where DeBoer was once again the head coach and general manager, while Spott took the assistant coaching job and assistant general manager job. DeBoer would leave the Rangers in 2008 to take a job with the Florida Panthers, and the Rangers promoted Spott to become the head coach and general manager of the club.

In his first season as head coach with the Rangers in 2008–09, the rebuilding club failed to qualify for the playoffs for the first time since the 2000–01 season.

The Rangers improved greatly in Spott's second season as head coach in 2009–10, as Kitchener improved by 34 points, as they had a 42–19–4–3 record, as Kitchener finished in second place in the Midwest Division. The Rangers defeated the Saginaw Spirit in six games in the Western Conference quarter-finals, then the team upset the favoured London Knights in seven games in the semi-finals. Kitchener then faced the heavily favoured Windsor Spitfires in the Western Conference finals, and went up 3 games to 0 in the best of seven series, however, the Spitfires came all the way back, and defeated the Rangers in seven games. It marked the first time since 2005 that a team came back from a 3–0 deficit to win a series.

Kitchener had another solid season in 2010–11, as the club had a 38–21–4–5 record, earning 85 points, and second place in the Midwest Division for the second consecutive season. Kitchener faced off against the Plymouth Whalers in the Western Conference quarter-finals, however, the club was upset by the Whalers in seven games.

The Rangers once again made the playoffs in 2011–12, finishing the regular season with a 42-24-1-1 record, registering 86 points and capturing second place in the Midwest Division for the third straight season. In the playoffs, Spott led the Rangers to a six-game opening round victory over the defending OHL champions, the Owen Sound Attack. In the second round, Kitchener defeated the Plymouth Whalers in seven games to earn a trip to the Western Conference finals for the second time in three seasons. The Rangers though were no match for the London Knights, who won the series in four games.

Kitchener once again had another very solid season in 2012–13, finishing with a 39-20-1-8 record, earning 87 points and third place in the Midwest Division. In the opening round of the playoffs, the Rangers defeated their rivals, the Guelph Storm in five games, before losing to the London Knights in five games in the second round.

On July 3, 2013, Spott resigned as head coach and general manager of the Rangers.

=== American Hockey League ===
On July 3, 2013, Spott was named head coach of the Toronto Marlies, the AHL affiliate of the Toronto Maple Leafs. Spott played for the Maple Leafs former AHL affiliate, the Newmarket Saints, during the 1990–91 season.

=== National Hockey League ===
Spott would leave the Marlies after a season, leading them to the Western Conference Finals, as he joined the Toronto Maple Leafs as an assistant coach, serving under Randy Carlyle. He was relieved of his duties on April 12, 2015, one day after the 2014–15 regular season ended, along with General Manager Dave Nonis, Head Coach Peter Horachek, Chris Dennis and goaltending coach Rick St. Croix.

On August 24, 2015, the San Jose Sharks announced that Spott had been hired as an assistant coach. On December 11, 2019, Spott and head coach Peter DeBoer were fired by the Sharks. Spott was named an assistant coach for the Vegas Golden Knights on January 28, 2020, reuniting him with DeBoer.

On May 16, 2022, Spott was fired by the Vegas Golden Knights.

On July 1, 2022, Spott was hired as an assistant coach by the Dallas Stars.

=== International ===
During the 2010 World Junior Ice Hockey Championships, Spott was a member of the coaching staff that captured a silver medal during the tournament. Spott also worked with Hockey Canada during other tournaments, such as the 2011 Ivan Hlinka Memorial Tournament, where Spott and the Canadian team won the gold medal.

On May 18, 2012, Spott was named coach of the Canadian national under-20 team for the 2013 World Junior Ice Hockey Championships. After leading Canada to a 4-0-0 record in the round-robin, the club lost to the United States 5–1 in the semi-final, then suffered a 6–5 loss to Russia in the bronze medal game, as Canada finished in fourth place in the tournament.

== Coaching record ==
=== OHL ===
Team	Year	Regular Season							Post Season
Team	Year	G	W	L	OTL	SL	Pts	Finish	Result
KIT	2008–09	68	26	37	3	2	57	5th in Midwest	Missed playoffs
KIT	2009–10	68	42	19	4	3	91	2nd in Midwest	Won in conference quarter-finals (4-2 vs. SAG); Won in conference semi-finals (4-3 vs. LDN); Lost in conference finals (3-4 vs. WSR)
KIT	2010–11	68	38	21	4	5	85	2nd in Midwest	Lost in conference quarter-finals (3-4 vs. PLY)
KIT	2011–12	68	42	24	1	1	86	2nd in Midwest	Won in conference quarter-finals (4-1 vs. OS); Won in conference semi-finals (4-3 vs. PLY); Lost in conference finals (0-4 vs. LDN)
KIT	2012–13	68	39	20	1	8	87	3rd in Midwest	Won in conference quarter-finals (4-1 vs. GUE); Lost in conference semi-finals (1-4 vs. LDN)
OHL totals		340	187	121	13	19	406		27-26 (0.509)

=== AHL ===
Team	Year	Regular Season							Post Season
Team	Year	G	W	L	OTL	SL	Pts	Finish	Result
TOR	2013–14	76	45	25	2	4	96	1st in North	Won in conference quarter-finals (3-0 vs. MIL); Won in conference semi-finals (4-0 vs. CHI); Lost in conference finals (3-4 vs. TEX)
AHL totals		76	45	25	2	4	96	1 division title	10-4 (0.714)

== Personal life ==
Spott lives in Plano, Texas while his wife Lisa Spott and their two children, a son and a daughter live in Toronto. He is the uncle of former longtime Florida Panthers centre Stephen Weiss.

== Career statistics ==
			Regular Season					Playoffs
Season	Team	League	GP	G	A	Pts	PIM	GP	G	A	Pts	PIM
1986–87	Colgate University	NCAA	33	21	13	34	34	–	–	–	–	–
1987–88	Colgate University	NCAA	32	14	16	30	30	–	–	–	–	–
1988–89	Colgate University	NCAA	29	20	15	35	58	–	–	–	–	–
1989–90	Colgate University	NCAA	37	20	29	49	91	–	–	–	–	–
1990–91	Richmond Renegades	ECHL	27	14	14	28	18	–	–	–	–	–
1990–91	Newmarket Saints	AHL	20	3	4	7	2	–	–	–	–	–
1991–92	Heerenveen Flyers	NED	30	22	25	47	50	10	12	13	25	8
NCAA totals			121	75	73	148	213	–	–	–	–	–
ECHL totals			27	14	14	28	18	–	–	–	–	–
AHL totals			20	3	4	7	2	–	–	–	–	–
NED totals			30	22	25	47	50	10	12	13	25	8
