= Dave Nonis =

Canadian former ice hockey defenceman (born 1966)

- Born: May 25, 1966 (age 60) Burnaby, British Columbia, Canada
- Height: 6 ft 0 in (183 cm)
- Weight: 183 lb (83 kg; 13 st 1 lb)
- Position: Defence
- Shot: Left
- Played for: Univ. of Maine
- Playing career: 1982–1988

David M. Nonis (born May 25, 1966) is a Canadian former ice hockey defenceman and is currently an assistant general manager and senior VP of hockey operations for the Calgary Flames.

== Playing career ==
Growing up in Burnaby, B.C., Nonis played junior hockey with the Burnaby Bluehawks of the BCJHL in 1982–83. He then began collegiate hockey in the NCAA at the University of Maine, playing 153 games from 1984 through 1988. Nonis spent his final two years for the Bears as team captain, leading Maine to back-to-back NCAA championship tournaments. After completing his Bachelor of Arts degree in 1988, Nonis played a year of professional hockey for Aalborg (AaB) in the Danish Hockey League. In 1989, he returned to the University of Maine as an assistant coach for one season.

== Executive career ==
Nonis replaced Brian Burke as the Vancouver Canucks' general manager in 2004. At 37 years old, he was the youngest general manager in team history. Prior to being GM for the Canucks, he spent six years working closely with Burke as senior vice-president and director of hockey operations for the franchise. In three seasons as general manager, his most significant transaction was trading for superstar goaltender Roberto Luongo from the Florida Panthers at the conclusion of his first season as GM.

Upon the completion of the 2007–08 season, the Canucks missed the playoffs for the second time in three seasons; subsequently, on April 14, 2008, Nonis was relieved of his duties as general manager of the Canucks.

Two months later, on June 21, 2008, Nonis was hired as senior advisor of hockey operations for the Anaheim Ducks, reuniting with longtime boss Brian Burke, who had been General Manager of the Ducks since 2005.

On December 4, 2008, Nonis accepted the position of senior vice-president and director of hockey operations of the Toronto Maple Leafs. Nonis accepted the post and it marked the third time he served under Brian Burke. On May 10, 2010 he signed an extension to keep his position through the 2011-12 season.

On January 9, 2013, Nonis was named general manager of the Toronto Maple Leafs after Burke was relieved of his duties. Under Nonis, the Maple Leafs made the 2013 playoffs for the first time since 2004. However, after two disappointing seasons, Nonis was relieved of his duties on April 12, 2015, one day after the 2014-15 regular season ended, along with head coach Peter Horachek, assistant coaches Steve Spott and Chris Denis, and goaltending coach Rick St. Croix.

On July 3, 2015, the Anaheim Ducks announced they had hired Nonis as a special assignment scout and a consultant to the team's general manager, Bob Murray. He was promoted to assistant general manager in 2019, before being let go from the role in February 2022 by incoming general manager, Pat Verbeek.

== Personal life ==
David is married to Susan, with whom he has one son, Nicholas. He has two brothers and a sister and is also a second cousin of sportscaster Darren Dreger of TSN.

Preceded by Brian Burke	General Manager of the Vancouver Canucks; 2004–08	Succeeded by Mike Gillis
Preceded by Brian Burke	General Manager of the Toronto Maple Leafs; 2013–15	Succeeded by Lou Lamoriello
