= 2014–15 Arizona Coyotes season =

NHL hockey team season

2014–15 Arizona Coyotes
- Division: 7th Pacific
- Conference: 14th Western
- 2014–15 record: 24–50–8
- Home record: 11–25–5
- Road record: 13–25–3
- Goals for: 170
- Goals against: 272

Team information
- General manager: Don Maloney
- Coach: Dave Tippett
- Captain: Shane Doan
- Alternate captains: Kyle Chipchura (Mar.–Apr.); Oliver Ekman-Larsson (Mar.–Apr.); Martin Hanzal; Keith Yandle (Oct.–Mar.)
- Arena: Gila River Arena
- Average attendance: 13,345 (77.9%); 41 Games
- Minor league affiliates: Portland Pirates (AHL); Gwinnett Gladiators (ECHL)

Team leaders
- Goals: Oliver Ekman-Larsson (23)
- Assists: Sam Gagner (26)
- Points: Oliver Ekman-Larsson (43)
- Penalty minutes: Kyle Chipchura (82)
- Plus/minus: Rob Klinkhammer (+3)
- Wins: Mike Smith (14)
- Goals against average: Louis Domingue (2.73)

The 2014–15 Arizona Coyotes season was the 36th season for the National Hockey League (NHL) franchise that was established on June 22, 1979, the 19th season since the franchise relocated from Winnipeg following the 1995–96 NHL season, and the 43rd overall, including the World Hockey Association years. It was also their first season as the "Arizona Coyotes" – the team had been called the "Phoenix Coyotes" for the previous 18 years. The team finished in last place in the Western Conference and failed to qualify for the playoffs for the third straight year. The Coyotes earned only 56 points – their worst-ever performance in Arizona and second worst in franchise history after the 1980–81 season.

== Off-season ==
The club officially changed their team name to the "Arizona Coyotes" on June 27, 2014, at the 2014 NHL entry draft. The name change was part of the deal approved by the City of Glendale to keep the team from relocating.

=== Training camp ===
The Coyotes competed in eight preseason exhibition games before the start of the 2014–15 regular season.

== Standings ==
Pacific Division
Pos	Team	GP	W	L	OTL	ROW	GF	GA	GD	Pts
1	z – Anaheim Ducks	82	51	24	7	43	236	226	+10	109
2	x – Vancouver Canucks	82	48	29	5	42	242	222	+20	101
3	x – Calgary Flames	82	45	30	7	41	241	216	+25	97
4	Los Angeles Kings	82	40	27	15	38	220	205	+15	95
5	San Jose Sharks	82	40	33	9	36	228	232	−4	89
6	Edmonton Oilers	82	24	44	14	19	198	283	−85	62
7	Arizona Coyotes	82	24	50	8	19	170	272	−102	56

Source: National Hockey League
x – Clinched playoff spot; z – Clinched conference

Western Conference Wild Card
Pos	Div	Team	GP	W	L	OTL	ROW	GF	GA	GD	Pts
1	CE	x – Minnesota Wild	82	46	28	8	42	231	201	+30	100
2	CE	x – Winnipeg Jets	82	43	26	13	36	230	210	+20	99
3	PA	Los Angeles Kings	82	40	27	15	38	220	205	+15	95
4	CE	Dallas Stars	82	41	31	10	37	261	260	+1	92
5	CE	Colorado Avalanche	82	39	31	12	29	219	227	−8	90
6	PA	San Jose Sharks	82	40	33	9	36	228	232	−4	89
7	PA	Edmonton Oilers	82	24	44	14	19	198	283	−85	62
8	PA	Arizona Coyotes	82	24	50	8	19	170	272	−102	56

Source: National Hockey League
x – Clinched playoff spot

== Schedule and results ==
=== Pre-season ===
Pre-season game log: 4–2–2 (Home: 1–1–0; Road: 3–1–2)
#	Date	Visitor	Score	Home	OT	Decision	Attendance	Record	Recap
1	September 22	Los Angeles	4–5	Arizona	SO	Smith	6,917	1–0–0	Recap
2	September 22	Arizona	3–4	Los Angeles	SO	Dubnyk	12,989	1–0–1	Recap
3	September 23	Arizona	4–0	Anaheim		Domingue	14,104	2–0–1	Recap
4^{[a]}	September 24	Arizona	3–4	Calgary	OT	Burke		2–0–2	Recap
5	September 26	Arizona	2–1	San Jose	SO	Dubnyk	15,452	3–0–2	Recap
6	September 29	Arizona	4–2	Vancouver		Smith	18,050	4–0–2	Recap
7	October 1	Arizona	2–3	Edmonton		Dubnyk	16,839	4–1–2	Recap
8	October 3	San Jose	3–1	Arizona		Smith	7,873	4–2–2	Recap
Notes:^{a} Game was played in Sylvan Lake, Alberta (Kraft Hockeyville game).

=== Regular season ===
Game log

October: 3–5–1 (Home: 3–2–0; Road: 0–3–1)
#	Date	Visitor	Score	Home	OT	Decision	Attendance	Record	Pts	Recap
1	October 9	Winnipeg	6–2	Arizona		Smith	17,125	0–1–0	0	Recap
2	October 11	Los Angeles	2–3	Arizona	OT	Dubnyk	12,859	1–1–0	2	Recap
3	October 15	Edmonton	4–7	Arizona		Smith	11,648	2–1–0	4	Recap
4	October 18	St. Louis	6–1	Arizona		Smith	11,100	2–2–0	4	Recap
5	October 21	Arizona	3–4	Nashville	SO	Dubnyk	15,694	2–2–1	5	Recap
6	October 23	Arizona	0–2	Minnesota		Smith	18,554	2–3–1	5	Recap
7	October 25	Florida	1–2	Arizona	OT	Smith	13,202	3–3–1	7	Recap
8	October 28	Arizona	3–7	Tampa Bay		Smith	17,511	3–4–1	7	Recap
9	October 30	Arizona	1–2	Florida		Smith	7,691	3–5–1	7	Recap

November: 6–7–2 (Home: 1–3–2; Road: 5–4–0)
#	Date	Visitor	Score	Home	OT	Decision	Attendance	Record	Pts	Recap
10	November 1	Arizona	0–3	Carolina		Smith	10,870	3–6–1	7	Recap
11	November 2	Arizona	6–5	Washington		Dubnyk	18,506	4–6–1	9	Recap
12	November 4	Toronto	2–3	Arizona		Smith	14,202	5–6–1	11	Recap
13	November 7	Arizona	3–2	Anaheim	SO	Smith	16,235	6–6–1	13	Recap
14	November 8	NY Islanders	1–0	Arizona		Smith	14,689	6–7–1	13	Recap
15	November 11	Dallas	4–3	Arizona		Smith	11,866	6–8–1	13	Recap
16	November 13	Arizona	3–5	Calgary		Smith	18,698	6–9–1	13	Recap
17	November 14	Arizona	5–0	Vancouver		Dubnyk	18,708	7–9–1	15	Recap
18	November 16	Arizona	2–1	Edmonton		Dubnyk	16,839	8–9–1	17	Recap
19	November 18	Washington	2–1	Arizona	OT	Smith	11,769	8–9–2	18	Recap
20	November 20	Arizona	1–3	Dallas		Smith	16,078	8–10–2	18	Recap
21	November 22	Arizona	4–3	San Jose	SO	Dubnyk	17,297	9–10–2	20	Recap
22	November 23	Arizona	1–2	Anaheim		Smith	15,928	9–11–2	20	Recap
23	November 25	Colorado	4–3	Arizona	OT	Smith	12,163	9–11–3	21	Recap
24	November 29	Calgary	3–0	Arizona		Dubnyk	13,530	9–12–3	21	Recap

December: 5–7–1 (Home: 3–3–1; Road: 2–4–0)
#	Date	Visitor	Score	Home	OT	Decision	Attendance	Record	Pts	Recap
25	December 1	Arizona	5–2	Edmonton		Smith	16,839	10–12–3	23	Recap
26	December 2	Arizona	2–5	Calgary		Smith	18,837	10–13–3	23	Recap
27	December 4	Los Angeles	4–0	Arizona		Smith	12,254	10–14–3	23	Recap
28	December 6	Boston	5–2	Arizona		Dubnyk	13,114	10–15–3	23	Recap
29	December 11	Nashville	5–1	Arizona		Smith	10,194	10–16–3	23	Recap
30	December 13	Minnesota	4–3	Arizona	SO	Dubnyk	13,975	10–16–4	24	Recap
31	December 16	Edmonton	1–2	Arizona	OT	Dubnyk	12,085	11–16–4	26	Recap
32	December 20	Arizona	2–4	Los Angeles		Dubnyk	18,230	11–17–4	26	Recap
33	December 22	Arizona	1–7	Vancouver		Smith	18,794	11–18–4	26	Recap
34	December 23	Arizona	5–1	Edmonton		Dubnyk	16,839	12–18–4	28	Recap
35	December 27	Anaheim	1–2	Arizona		Dubnyk	13,656	13–18–4	30	Recap
36	December 29	Philadelphia	2–4	Arizona		Dubnyk	16,521	14–18–4	32	Recap
37	December 31	Arizona	0–6	Dallas		Dubnyk	18,532	14–19–4	32	Recap

January: 3–7–2 (Home: 2–4–0; Road: 1–3–2)
#	Date	Visitor	Score	Home	OT	Decision	Attendance	Record	Pts	Recap
38	January 3	Columbus	3–6	Arizona		Smith	13,159	15–19–4	34	Recap
39	January 6	St. Louis	6–0	Arizona		Smith	10,876	15–20–4	34	Recap
40	January 8	Winnipeg	1–4	Arizona		Smith	11,390	16–20–4	36	Recap
41	January 10	Ottawa	5–1	Arizona		Smith	14,933	16–21–4	36	Recap
42	January 13	San Jose	3–2	Arizona		Dubnyk	10,631	16–22–4	36	Recap
43	January 15	Calgary	4–1	Arizona		Smith	12,982	16–23–4	36	Recap
44	January 17	Arizona	1–3	Minnesota		Smith	19,111	16–24–4	36	Recap
45	January 18	Arizona	3–4	Winnipeg	SO	Smith	15,016	16–24–5	37	Recap
46	January 20	Arizona	1–6	Chicago		Smith	21,427	16–25–5	37	Recap
47	January 27	Arizona	3–4	Philadelphia	SO	Smith	19,581	16–25–6	38	Recap
48	January 29	Arizona	3–1	Toronto		Smith	18,837	17–25–6	40	Recap
49	January 31	Arizona	2–7	Ottawa		Smith	18,489	17–26–6	40	Recap

February: 3–10–1 (Home: 0–4–1; Road: 3–6–0)
#	Date	Visitor	Score	Home	OT	Decision	Attendance	Record	Pts	Recap
50	February 1	Arizona	3–2	Montreal		Domingue	21,286	18–26–6	42	Recap
51	February 3	Arizona	4–1	Columbus		Smith	14,108	19–26–6	44	Recap
52	February 5	Carolina	2–1	Arizona	SO	Smith	12,649	19–26–7	45	Recap
53	February 7	Detroit	3–1	Arizona		Smith	17,125	19–27–7	45	Recap
54	February 9	Arizona	3–2	Chicago	SO	Smith	21,337	20–27–7	47	Recap
55	February 10	Arizona	1–2	St. Louis		Smith	17,312	20–28–7	47	Recap
56	February 13	San Jose	4–2	Arizona		Smith	16,713	20–29–7	47	Recap
57	February 14	NY Rangers	5–1	Arizona		Smith	14,719	20–30–7	47	Recap
58	February 16	Arizona	2–5	Colorado		McKenna	14,132	20–31–7	47	Recap
59	February 21	Tampa Bay	4–2	Arizona		Smith	12,997	20–32–7	47	Recap
60	February 23	Arizona	0–3	New Jersey		Smith	12,159	20–33–7	47	Recap
61	February 24	Arizona	1–5	NY Islanders		Smith	15,888	20–34–7	47	Recap
62	February 26	Arizona	3–4	NY Rangers		Smith	18,006	20–35–7	47	Recap
63	February 28	Arizona	1–4	Boston		Smith	17,565	20–36–7	47	Recap

March: 3–10–1 (Home: 1–8–1; Road: 2–2–0)
#	Date	Visitor	Score	Home	OT	Decision	Attendance	Record	Pts	Recap
64	March 3	Anaheim	4–1	Arizona		Smith	11,387	20–37–7	47	Recap
65	March 5	Vancouver	2–3	Arizona	SO	Smith	12,589	21–37–7	49	Recap
66	March 7	Montreal	2–0	Arizona		Smith	14,094	21–38–7	49	Recap
67	March 9	Nashville	2–1	Arizona	OT	Domingue	11,227	21–38–8	50	Recap
68	March 12	Chicago	2–1	Arizona		Smith	17,534	21–39–8	50	Recap
69	March 14	New Jersey	4–1	Arizona		Smith	12,425	21–40–8	50	Recap
70	March 16	Arizona	0–1	Los Angeles		Smith	18,230	21–41–8	50	Recap
71	March 19	Colorado	5–2	Arizona		Domingue	11,684	21–42–8	50	Recap
72	March 21	Pittsburgh	3–1	Arizona		Smith	15,581	21–43–8	50	Recap
73	March 22	Vancouver	3–1	Arizona		Smith	12,405	21–44–8	50	Recap
74	March 24	Arizona	5–4	Detroit	OT	Smith	20,027	22–44–8	52	Recap
75	March 26	Arizona	4–3	Buffalo	OT	Smith	19,070	23–44–8	54	Recap
76	March 28	Arizona	2–3	Pittsburgh		Smith	18,627	23–45–8	54	Recap
77	March 30	Buffalo	4–1	Arizona		Smith	13,612	23–46–8	54	Recap

April: 1–4–0 (Home: 1–1–0; Road: 0–3–0)
#	Date	Visitor	Score	Home	OT	Decision	Attendance	Record	Pts	Recap
78	April 3	Arizona	1–3	San Jose		Domingue	17,562	23–47–8	54	Recap
79	April 4	San Jose	3–5	Arizona		Smith	14,752	24–47–8	56	Recap
80	April 7	Arizona	2–3	Calgary		Smith	19,289	24–48–8	56	Recap
81	April 9	Arizona	0–5	Vancouver		Smith	18,796	24–49–8	56	Recap
82	April 11	Anaheim	2–1	Arizona		Smith	15,733	24–50–8	56	Recap

Legend: Win (2 points) Loss (0 points) Overtime/shootout loss (1 point)

== Player statistics ==
Final stats

Skaters

Regular season
Player	GP	G	A	Pts	+/−	PIM
Oliver Ekman-Larsson	82	23	20	43	−18	40
Sam Gagner	81	15	26	41	−28	28
Keith Yandle^{‡}	63	4	37	41	−32	32
Shane Doan	79	14	22	36	−29	65
Antoine Vermette^{‡}	62	13	22	35	−22	34
Martin Erat	79	9	23	32	−16	48
Mikkel Boedker	45	14	14	28	−10	6
Martin Hanzal	37	8	16	24	−1	31
Tobias Rieder	72	13	8	21	−19	14
Lauri Korpikoski	69	6	15	21	−27	12
Michael Stone	81	3	15	18	−24	60
Mark Arcobello^{†}	27	9	7	16	−4	6
Kyle Chipchura	70	4	10	14	−23	82
David Moss	60	4	8	12	−18	24
Joe Vitale	70	3	6	9	−11	36
Zbynek Michalek^{‡}	53	2	6	8	−6	12
Connor Murphy	73	4	3	7	−27	42
B. J. Crombeen	58	3	3	6	−6	79
Lucas Lessio	26	2	3	5	−10	8
John Moore^{†}	19	1	4	5	−11	11
Brandon Gormley	27	2	2	4	−7	10
Craig Cunningham^{†}	19	1	3	4	−3	2
David Schlemko^{‡}	20	1	3	4	−5	4
Rob Klinkhammer^{‡}	19	3	0	3	3	4
Brandon McMillan^{‡}	50	1	2	3	−18	16
Klas Dahlbeck^{†}	19	0	3	3	−7	6
Chris Summers^{‡}	17	0	3	3	−12	8
Tye McGinn^{†}	18	1	1	2	−1	10
Justin Hodgman	5	1	0	1	−2	2
Jordan Szwarz	9	1	0	1	−2	2
Andrew Campbell	33	0	1	1	−13	10
Brendan Shinnimin	12	0	1	1	−1	8
Jordan Martinook	8	0	1	1	−3	0
Alexandre Bolduc	3	0	0	0	−1	2
Dylan Reese	1	0	0	0	−1	0
Philip Samuelsson	4	0	0	0	−3	0
Henrik Samuelsson	3	0	0	0	−2	2
Tyler Gaudet	2	0	0	0	−1	0

Goaltenders

Regular season
Player	GP	GS	TOI	W	L	OT	GA	GAA	SA	SV%	SO	G	A	PIM
Mike Smith	62	61	3,556	14	42	5	187	3.16	1955	.904	0	0	1	10
Devan Dubnyk^{‡}	19	16	1035	9	5	2	47	2.72	561	.916	1	0	0	0
Louis Domingue	7	4	308	1	2	1	14	2.73	158	.911	0	0	0	0
Mike McKenna	1	1	60	0	1	0	5	5.00	34	.853	0	0	0	0

^{†}Denotes player spent time with another team before joining the Coyotes. Stats reflect time with the Coyotes only.
^{‡}Traded mid-season
Bold/italics denotes franchise record

== Notable achievements ==
=== Awards ===
Regular season
Player	Award	Awarded
S. Gagner	NHL Third Star of the Week	December 29, 2014
O. Ekman-Larsson	NHL All-Star game selection	January 10, 2015

=== Milestones ===
Regular season
Player	Milestone	Reached
J. Hodgman	1st career NHL game 1st career NHL goal 1st career NHL point	October 25, 2014
A. Vermette	400th career NHL point	October 28, 2014
T. Rieder	1st career NHL game 1st career NHL goal 1st career NHL point	November 2, 2014
M. Smith	150th career NHL win	November 4, 2014
Z. Michalek	500th career NHL game	November 8, 2014
B. Crombeen	400th career NHL game	November 14, 2014
S. Gagner	300th career NHL point	November 14, 2014
B. Gormley	1st career NHL goal 1st career NHL point	November 16, 2014
D. Dubnyk	10,000 career NHL minutes	November 16, 2014
S. Gagner	500th career NHL game	November 18, 2014
S. Gagner	200th career NHL assist	November 20, 2014
M. Boedker	100th career NHL assist	November 22, 2014
B. Shinnimin	1st career NHL game	November 29, 2014
D. Schlemko	200th career NHL game	December 1, 2014
J. Martinook	1st career NHL game	December 6, 2014
T. Gaudet	1st career NHL game	December 29, 2014
J. Vitale	200th career NHL game	January 6, 2015
M. Smith	20,000 career NHL minutes	January 8, 2015
K. Yandle	300th career NHL point	January 20, 2015
A. Vermette	800th career NHL game	January 29, 2015
L. Domingue	1st career NHL game	January 31, 2015
L. Domingue	1st career NHL win	February 1, 2015
B. Shinnimin	1st career NHL assist 1st career NHL point	February 3, 2015
M. Arcobello	100th career NHL game	February 28, 2015
L. Korpikoski	400th career NHL game	March 22, 2015
M. Stone	200th career NHL game	April 3, 2015
C. Murphy	100th career NHL game	April 4, 2015

== Transactions ==
The Coyotes have been involved in the following transactions during the 2014–15 season.

=== Trades ===
June 28, 2014	To Montreal Canadiens 3rd-round pick in 2014	To Arizona Coyotes 3rd-round pick in 2014; 4th-round pick in 2014
June 29, 2014	To Tampa Bay Lightning 6th-round pick in 2015	To Arizona Coyotes Sam Gagner; B. J. Crombeen
December 5, 2014	To Pittsburgh Penguins Rob Klinkhammer conditional 5th-round pick in 2016	To Arizona Coyotes Philip Samuelsson
January 14, 2015	To Minnesota Wild Devan Dubnyk	To Arizona Coyotes 3rd-round pick in 2015
February 28, 2015	To Chicago Blackhawks Antoine Vermette	To Arizona Coyotes Klas Dahlbeck; 1st-round pick in 2015
March 1, 2015	To New York Rangers Keith Yandle; Chris Summers; 4th-round pick in 2016	To Arizona Coyotes John Moore; Anthony Duclair; 2nd-round pick in 2015; Conditional 1st-round pick in 2016
March 2, 2015	To St. Louis Blues Zbynek Michalek; Conditional 3rd-round pick in 2015	To Arizona Coyotes Maxim Letunov
March 2, 2015	To New York Islanders Mark Louis	To Arizona Coyotes David Leggio

=== Free agents acquired ===
Date	Player	Former team	Contract terms (in U.S. dollars)	Ref
July 1, 2014	Devan Dubnyk	Nashville Predators	1 year, $800,000	
July 1, 2014	Mike McKenna	Columbus Blue Jackets	1 year, $550,000	
July 1, 2014	Andrew Campbell	Manchester Monarchs	1 year, $550,000	
July 1, 2014	Alexandre Bolduc	St. Louis Blues	1 year, $600,000	
July 1, 2014	Justin Hodgman	Metallurg Magnitogorsk	1 year, $550,000	
July 1, 2014	Dylan Reese	Amur Khabarovsk	1 year, $550,000	
July 1, 2014	Joe Vitale	Pittsburgh Penguins	3 years, $3.3 million	
July 5, 2014	Patrick McNeill	Columbus Blue Jackets	1 year, $550,000	
May 28, 2015	Matthias Plachta	Adler Mannheim	1 year, entry-level contract	

=== Free agents lost ===
Date	Player	New team	Contract terms (in U.S. dollars)	Ref
July 1, 2014	Thomas Greiss	Pittsburgh Penguins	1 year, $1 million	
July 1, 2014	Andy Miele	Detroit Red Wings	1 year, $600,000	
July 2, 2014	Radim Vrbata	Vancouver Canucks	2 years, $10 million	
July 4, 2014	Tim Kennedy	Washington Capitals	1 year, $550,000	
July 15, 2014	Mike Ribeiro	Nashville Predators	1 year, $1.05 million	

=== Claimed via waivers ===
Player	Former team	Date claimed off waivers
Mark Arcobello	Pittsburgh Penguins	February 11, 2015
Tye McGinn	San Jose Sharks	March 2, 2015
Craig Cunningham	Boston Bruins	March 2, 2015

=== Lost via waivers ===
Player	New team	Date claimed off waivers
Brandon McMillan	Vancouver Canucks	February 12, 2015

=== Player signings ===
The following players were signed by the Coyotes. Two-way contracts are marked with an asterisk (*).

Date	Player	Contract terms (in U.S. dollars)	Ref
July 11, 2014	David Moss	1 year, $800,000	
July 15, 2014	Brandon McMillan	1 year, $625,000*	
July 15, 2014	Jordan Szwarz	2 years, $1.26 million*	
July 18, 2014	Brendan Perlini	3-year, $2.775 million entry-level contract	
October 5, 2014	Laurent Dauphin	3-year, $2.775 million entry-level contract	
April 10, 2015	Ryan MacInnis	3-year, entry-level contract	
April 17, 2015	Christian Dvorak	3-year, entry-level contract	

== Draft picks ==
The 2014 NHL entry draft will be held on June 27–28, 2014, at the Wells Fargo Center in Philadelphia, Pennsylvania.

Round	#	Player	Pos	Nationality	College/Junior/Club team (League)
1	12	Brendan Perlini	LW	Canada	Niagara IceDogs (OHL)
2	43	Ryan MacInnis	C	United States	Kitchener Rangers (OHL)
2	58^{[a]}	Christian Dvorak	LW	United States	London Knights (OHL)
3	87^{[b]}	Anton Karlsson	RW	Sweden	Frolunda HC Jr. (Sweden Jr)
4	117^{[b]}	Michael Bunting	LW	Canada	Sault Ste. Marie Greyhounds (OHL)
5	133	Dysin Mayo	D	Canada	Edmonton Oil Kings (WHL)
6	163	David Westlund	D	Sweden	Brynas IF Jr. (Sweden Jr.)
7	191^{[c]}	Jared Fiegl	LW	United States	USA U–18 (USHL)
7	193	Edgars Kulda	LW	Latvia	Edmonton Oil Kings (WHL)

Draft notes

- ^{a} The Chicago Blackhawks second-round pick went to the Arizona Coyotes as the result of a trade on March 4, 2014, that sent David Rundblad, Mathieu Brisebois to the Blackhawks in exchange for this pick.
- ^{b} The Arizona Coyotes third-round pick went to the Montreal Canadiens as the result of a trade on June 28, 2014, that sent a third and fourth-round pick in 2014 to Arizona in exchange for this pick.
- The Arizona Coyotes' fourth-round pick went to the Toronto Maple Leafs as the result of a trade on January 16, 2013, that sent Matthew Lombardi to the Coyotes in exchange for this pick.
- ^{c} The New Jersey Devils seventh-round pick went to the Arizona Coyotes as the result of a trade on April 3, 2013, that sent Steve Sullivan to the Devils in exchange for this pick.
