= 2014–15 Anaheim Ducks season =

NHL team season

2014–15 Anaheim Ducks
- Pacific Division champions
- Division: 1st Pacific
- Conference: 1st Western
- 2014–15 record: 51–24–7
- Home record: 26–12–3
- Road record: 25–12–4
- Goals for: 236
- Goals against: 226

Team information
- General manager: Bob Murray
- Coach: Bruce Boudreau
- Captain: Ryan Getzlaf
- Alternate captains: Francois Beauchemin; Corey Perry
- Arena: Honda Center
- Average attendance: 16,874 (98.3%) (41 games)

Team leaders
- Goals: Corey Perry (33)
- Assists: Ryan Getzlaf (45)
- Points: Ryan Getzlaf (70)
- Penalty minutes: Tim Jackman (86)
- Plus/minus: Hampus Lindholm (+25)
- Wins: Frederik Andersen (35)
- Goals against average: Frederik Andersen (2.38)

The 2014–15 Anaheim Ducks season was the 22nd season for the National Hockey League (NHL) franchise that was established on June 15, 1993. The Ducks won 51 regular season games and defeated the Winnipeg Jets and Calgary Flames in the playoffs before falling to the eventual Stanley Cup Champion Chicago Blackhawks in a seven-game Western Conference Final. 2015 marked the third playoffs in a row from which the Ducks were eliminated by losing a Game 7 at home after leading 3–2 after Game 5. Also, their final two losses to the Blackhawks were the only two playoff games the Ducks lost in regulation.

== Off-season ==
On May 19, 2014, the team announced a four-year contract extension for General Manager Bob Murray to keep him under contract through the 2019–20 season.

=== New uniforms ===
On June 27, 2014, the Ducks revealed new home and away jerseys, both based on the previous third jersey design that had been in use since 2010. The previous primary jerseys that had been worn since 2006 were subsequently retired.

== Regular season ==
The Ducks retired Teemu Selanne's number 8 on January 11, when they hosted the Winnipeg Jets. The Ducks defeated Winnipeg 5–4 in a comeback shootout victory following the ceremony. The team set an NHL record by winning 18 games in which they trailed in the 3rd period.

== Standings ==
Pacific Division
Pos	Team	GP	W	L	OTL	ROW	GF	GA	GD	Pts
1	z – Anaheim Ducks	82	51	24	7	43	236	226	+10	109
2	x – Vancouver Canucks	82	48	29	5	42	242	222	+20	101
3	x – Calgary Flames	82	45	30	7	41	241	216	+25	97
4	Los Angeles Kings	82	40	27	15	38	220	205	+15	95
5	San Jose Sharks	82	40	33	9	36	228	232	−4	89
6	Edmonton Oilers	82	24	44	14	19	198	283	−85	62
7	Arizona Coyotes	82	24	50	8	19	170	272	−102	56

Source: National Hockey League
x – Clinched playoff spot; z – Clinched conference

== Schedule and results ==
=== Pre-season ===
Pre-season game log: 3–3–1 (Home: 2–2–0; Road: 1–0–1)
#	Date	Visitor	Score	Home	OT	Decision	Attendance	Record	Recap
1	September 22	Colorado	0–4	Anaheim		Andersen	13,252	1–0–0	W1
2	September 22	Anaheim	5–2	Colorado		LaBarbera	13,252	2–0–0	W2
3	September 23	Arizona	4–0	Anaheim		Gibson	14,104	2–1–0	L1
4	September 25	Anaheim	3–4	Los Angeles	SO	Gibson	18,230	2–1–1	O1
5	September 27	Anaheim	1–3	San Jose		Gibson	16,248	2–2–1	L1
6	September 28	Los Angeles	4–2	Anaheim		Andersen	15,321	2–3–1	L2
7	October 4	San Jose	1–2	Anaheim	OT	Andersen	13,682	3–3–1	W1

=== Regular season ===
Game log

October: 9–3–0 (Home: 4–1–0; Road: 5–2–0)
#	Date	Visitor	Score	Home	OT	Decision	Attendance	Record	Pts	Recap
1	October 9	Anaheim	4–6	Pittsburgh		Gibson	18,633	0–1–0	0	L1
2	October 11	Anaheim	3–2	Detroit		Andersen	20,027	1–1–0	2	W1
3	October 13	Anaheim	5–1	Buffalo		Andersen	18,912	2–1–0	4	W2
4	October 14	Anaheim	4–3	Philadelphia	SO	Andersen	19,589	3–1–0	6	W3
5	October 17	Minnesota	1–2	Anaheim		Andersen	17,306	4–1–0	8	W4
6	October 19	St. Louis	0–3	Anaheim		Andersen	15,687	5–1–0	10	W5
7	October 22	Buffalo	1–4	Anaheim		Andersen	16,067	6–1–0	12	W6
8	October 24	Columbus	1–4	Anaheim		Gibson	15,778	7–1–0	14	W7
9	October 26	San Jose	4–1	Anaheim		Andersen	16,954	7–2–0	14	L1
10	October 28	Anaheim	1–0	Chicago		Gibson	21,233	8–2–0	16	W1
11	October 30	Anaheim	0–2	St. Louis		Gibson	16,723	8–3–0	16	L1
12	October 31	Anaheim	2–1	Dallas	OT	Andersen	15,343	9–3–0	18	W1

November: 5–3–5 (Home: 3–2–3; Road: 2–1–2)
#	Date	Visitor	Score	Home	OT	Decision	Attendance	Record	Pts	Recap
13	November 2	Anaheim	3–2	Colorado		LaBarbera	15,310	10–3–0	20	W2
14	November 5	NY Islanders	3–2	Anaheim	OT	LaBarbera	16,448	10–3–1	21	O1
15	November 7	Arizona	3–2	Anaheim	SO	Andersen	16,235	10–3–2	22	O2
16	November 9	Vancouver	2–1	Anaheim	SO	Andersen	16,749	10–3–3	23	O3
17	November 12	Los Angeles	5–6	Anaheim	SO	LaBarbera	17,245	11–3–3	25	W1
18	November 15	Anaheim	2–3	Los Angeles	OT	Andersen	18,230	11–3–4	26	O1
19	November 16	Florida	6–2	Anaheim		Andersen	16,128	11–4–4	26	L1
20	November 18	Anaheim	3–4	Calgary	SO	Andersen	18,421	11–4–5	27	O1
21	November 20	Anaheim	4–3	Vancouver	SO	Andersen	18,870	12–4–5	29	W1
22	November 23	Arizona	1–2	Anaheim		Andersen	15,928	13–4–5	31	W2
23	November 25	Calgary	2–3	Anaheim		Andersen	17,174	14–4–5	33	W3
24	November 28	Chicago	4–1	Anaheim		Andersen	17,355	14–5–5	33	L1
25	November 29	Anaheim	4–6	San Jose		Andersen	17,352	14–6–5	33	L2

December: 10–3–1 (Home: 5–1–0; Road: 5–2–1)
#	Date	Visitor	Score	Home	OT	Decision	Attendance	Record	Pts	Recap
26	December 1	Boston	2–3	Anaheim		Andersen	16,457	15–6–5	35	W1
27	December 3	Philadelphia	4–5	Anaheim	SO	Andersen	15,691	16–6–5	37	W2
28	December 5	Anaheim	5–4	Minnesota		Andersen	19,044	17–6–5	39	W3
29	December 7	Anaheim	4–3	Winnipeg	OT	Andersen	15,016	18–6–5	41	W4
30	December 10	Edmonton	1–2	Anaheim		Andersen	16,371	19–6–5	43	W5
31	December 12	Anaheim	4–2	Edmonton		Andersen	16,839	20–6–5	45	W6
32	December 13	Anaheim	4–1	Winnipeg		Andersen	15,016	21–6–5	47	W7
33	December 16	Anaheim	2–6	Toronto		Andersen	18,953	21–7–5	47	L1
34	December 18	Anaheim	2–1	Montreal		Andersen	21,286	22–7–5	49	W1
35	December 19	Anaheim	2–6	Ottawa		Bryzgalov	19,443	22–8–5	49	L1
36	December 22	San Jose	2–3	Anaheim	OT	Andersen	17,405	23–8–5	51	W1
37	December 27	Anaheim	1–2	Arizona	SO	Andersen	13,656	23–8–6	52	O1
38	December 28	Vancouver	1–2	Anaheim	OT	Andersen	17,374	24–8–6	54	W1
39	December 31	San Jose	3–0	Anaheim		Andersen	17,174	24–9–6	54	L1

January: 8–3–0 (Home: 6–2–0; Road: 2–1–0)
#	Date	Visitor	Score	Home	OT	Decision	Attendance	Record	Pts	Recap
40	January 2	St. Louis	3–4	Anaheim		Andersen	17,174	25–9–6	56	W1
41	January 4	Nashville	3–4	Anaheim	SO	Andersen	16,402	26–9–6	58	W2
42	January 7	NY Rangers	4–1	Anaheim		Bryzgalov	17,174	26–10–6	58	L1
43	January 11	Winnipeg	4–5	Anaheim	SO	Andersen	17,356	27–10–6	60	W1
44	January 14	Toronto	0–4	Anaheim		Andersen	16,741	28–10–6	62	W2
45	January 16	New Jersey	1–5	Anaheim		Bryzgalov	17,174	29–10–6	64	W3
46	January 17	Anaheim	3–2	Los Angeles	SO	Andersen	18,422	30–10–6	66	W4
47	January 21	Calgary	3–6	Anaheim		Andersen	16,828	31–10–6	68	W5
48	January 27	Anaheim	4–0	Vancouver		Andersen	18,813	32–10–6	70	W6
49	January 29	Anaheim	3–6	San Jose		Bryzgalov	17,562	32–11–6	70	L1
50	January 30	Chicago	4–1	Anaheim		Andersen	17,497	32–12–6	70	L2

February: 7–5–1 (Home: 3–3–0; Road: 4–2–1)
#	Date	Visitor	Score	Home	OT	Decision	Attendance	Record	Pts	Recap
51	February 3	Carolina	4–5	Anaheim	OT	Andersen	16,274	33–12–6	72	W1
52	February 5	Anaheim	5–2	Nashville		Andersen	17,113	34–12–6	74	W2
53	February 6	Anaheim	2–3	Washington	SO	Bryzgalov	18,506	34–12–7	75	O1
54	February 8	Anaheim	3–5	Tampa Bay		Andersen	19,204	34–13–7	75	L1
55	February 10	Anaheim	2–6	Florida		Bryzgalov	8,576	34–14–7	75	L2
56	February 12	Anaheim	2–1	Carolina		Gibson	11,991	35–14–7	77	W1
57	February 15	Washington	5–3	Anaheim		Gibson	17,252	35–15–7	77	L1
58	February 18	Tampa Bay	4–1	Anaheim		Gibson	17,284	35–16–7	77	L2
59	February 20	Anaheim	6–3	Calgary		Gibson	19,289	36–16–7	79	W1
60	February 21	Anaheim	2–1	Edmonton		Gibson	16,839	37–16–7	81	W2
61	February 23	Detroit	3–4	Anaheim	SO	Gibson	17,174	38–16–7	83	W3
62	February 25	Ottawa	3–0	Anaheim		Gibson	16,673	38–17–7	83	L1
63	February 27	Los Angeles	2–4	Anaheim		Gibson	17,413	39–17–7	85	W1

March: 10–5–0 (Home: 4–1–0; Road: 6–4–0)
#	Date	Visitor	Score	Home	OT	Decision	Attendance	Record	Pts	Recap
64	March 1	Anaheim	3–1	Dallas		Gibson	17,657	40–17–7	87	W2
65	March 3	Anaheim	4–1	Arizona		Andersen	11,387	41–17–7	89	W3
66	March 4	Montreal	1–3	Anaheim		Gibson	17,174	42–17–7	91	W4
67	March 6	Pittsburgh	5–2	Anaheim		Andersen	17,310	42–18–7	91	L1
68	March 9	Anaheim	1–2	Vancouver		Andersen	18,557	42–19–7	91	L2
69	March 11	Anaheim	3–6	Calgary		Gibson	19,289	42–20–7	91	L3
70	March 13	Anaheim	2–1	Minnesota		Gibson	19,045	43–20–7	93	W1
71	March 15	Nashville	2–4	Anaheim		Gibson	17,295	44–20–7	95	W2
72	March 18	Los Angeles	2–3	Anaheim	OT	Gibson	17,174	45–20–7	97	W3
73	March 20	Colorado	2–3	Anaheim	OT	Andersen	17,313	46–20–7	99	W4
74	March 22	Anaheim	2–7	NY Rangers		Andersen	18,006	46–21–7	99	L1
75	March 24	Anaheim	3–5	Columbus		Gibson	14,044	46–22–7	99	L2
76	March 26	Anaheim	3–2	Boston	OT	Andersen	17,565	47–22–7	101	W1
77	March 28	Anaheim	3–2	NY Islanders		Andersen	16,170	48–22–7	103	W2
78	March 29	Anaheim	2–1	New Jersey		Gibson	15,987	49–22–7	105	W3

April: 2–2–0 (Home: 1–2–0; Road: 1–0–0)
#	Date	Visitor	Score	Home	OT	Decision	Attendance	Record	Pts	Recap
79	April 1	Edmonton	1–5	Anaheim		Andersen	17,174	50–22–7	107	W4
80	April 3	Colorado	4–2	Anaheim		Gibson	17,201	50–23–7	107	L1
81	April 8	Dallas	4–0	Anaheim		Andersen	17,252	50–24–7	107	L2
82	April 11	Anaheim	2–1	Arizona		Andersen	15,733	51–24–7	109	W1

Legend: Win (2 points) Loss (0 points) Overtime/shootout loss (1 point)

=== Playoffs ===
2015 Stanley Cup Playoffs

Western Conference First Round vs. (WC2) Winnipeg Jets – Anaheim wins 4–0
#	Date	Visitor	Score	Home	OT	Decision	Attendance	Series	Recap
1	April 16	Winnipeg	2–4	Anaheim		Andersen	17,174	1–0	Recap
2	April 18	Winnipeg	1–2	Anaheim		Andersen	17,415	2–0	Recap
3	April 20	Anaheim	5–4	Winnipeg	OT	Andersen	15,016	3–0	Recap
4	April 22	Anaheim	5–2	Winnipeg		Andersen	15,016	4–0	Recap

Western Conference Second Round vs. (P3) Calgary Flames — Anaheim wins 4–1
#	Date	Visitor	Score	Home	OT	Decision	Attendance	Series	Recap
1	April 30	Calgary	1–6	Anaheim		Andersen	17,174	1–0	Recap
2	May 3	Calgary	0–3	Anaheim		Andersen	17,299	2–0	Recap
3	May 5	Anaheim	3–4	Calgary	OT	Andersen	19,289	2–1	Recap
4	May 8	Anaheim	4–2	Calgary		Andersen	19,289	3–1	Recap
5	May 10	Calgary	2–3	Anaheim	OT	Andersen	17,284	4–1	Recap

Western Conference Final vs. (C3) Chicago Blackhawks — Chicago wins 4–3
#	Date	Visitor	Score	Home	OT	Decision	Attendance	Series	Recap
1	May 17	Chicago	1–4	Anaheim		Andersen	17,291	1–0	Recap
2	May 19	Chicago	3–2	Anaheim	3OT	Andersen	17,234	1–1	Recap
3	May 21	Anaheim	2–1	Chicago		Andersen	22,160	2–1	Recap
4	May 23	Anaheim	4–5	Chicago	2OT	Andersen	22,404	2–2	Recap
5	May 25	Chicago	4–5	Anaheim	OT	Andersen	17,286	3–2	Recap
6	May 27	Anaheim	2–5	Chicago		Andersen	22,089	3–3	Recap
7	May 30	Chicago	5–3	Anaheim		Andersen	17,375	3–4	Recap

== Player statistics ==
Final Stats

Skaters

Regular season
Player	GP	G	A	Pts	+/−	PIM
Ryan Getzlaf	77	25	45	70	15	62
Corey Perry	67	33	22	55	13	67
Ryan Kesler	81	20	27	47	−5	75
Jakob Silfverberg	81	13	26	39	15	24
Sami Vatanen	67	12	25	37	5	36
Patrick Maroon	71	9	25	34	−5	82
Cam Fowler	80	7	27	34	4	14
Hampus Lindholm	78	7	27	34	25	32
Matt Beleskey	65	22	10	32	13	39
Rickard Rakell	71	9	22	31	6	10
Andrew Cogliano	82	15	14	29	5	14
Kyle Palmieri	57	14	15	29	−2	37
Francois Beauchemin	64	11	12	23	17	48
Nate Thompson	80	5	13	18	0	39
Devante Smith-Pelly^{‡}	54	5	12	17	1	12
Ben Lovejoy^{‡}	40	1	10	11	3	17
Emerson Etem	45	5	5	10	−6	4
Rene Bourque^{†‡}	30	2	6	8	−4	12
Clayton Stoner	69	1	7	8	−2	68
Tim Jackman	55	5	2	7	−4	86
Jiri Sekac^{†}	19	2	5	7	2	4
Tomas Fleischmann^{†}	14	1	5	6	0	4
Simon Despres^{†}	16	1	5	6	2	22
James Wisniewski^{†}	13	0	5	5	−3	10
William Karlsson^{‡}	18	2	1	3	1	2
Josh Manson	28	0	3	3	1	31
Eric Brewer^{†‡}	9	1	1	2	−6	6
Colby Robak^{†}	5	0	1	1	3	0
Mat Clark^{‡}	7	0	1	1	2	6
Bryan Allen^{‡}	6	0	1	1	0	4
Mark Fistric	9	0	0	0	−3	4
Chris Wagner	9	0	0	0	−2	2
Max Friberg	1	0	0	0	0	0
Stefan Noesen	1	0	0	0	0	0
Dany Heatley^{‡}	6	0	0	0	−3	0

Playoffs
Player	GP	G	A	Pts	+/−	PIM
Ryan Getzlaf	16	2	18	20	6	6
Corey Perry	16	10	8	18	6	14
Jakob Silfverberg	16	4	14	18	6	16
Ryan Kesler	16	7	6	13	2	24
Patrick Maroon	16	7	4	11	4	6
Sami Vatanen	16	3	8	11	5	8
Cam Fowler	16	2	8	10	5	2
Hampus Lindholm	16	2	8	10	2	10
Matt Beleskey	16	8	1	9	−4	2
Andrew Cogliano	16	3	6	9	9	4
Francois Beauchemin	16	0	9	9	4	2
Simon Despres	16	1	6	7	4	6
Nate Thompson	12	2	4	6	5	6
Kyle Palmieri	16	1	3	4	1	4
Emerson Etem	12	3	0	3	1	0
Clayton Stoner	16	1	0	1	4	10
Rickard Rakell	16	1	0	1	−2	2
Tomas Fleischmann	6	0	1	1	0	0
Tim Jackman	9	0	0	0	−1	12
Chris Wagner	2	0	0	0	0	0
Jiri Sekac	7	0	0	0	0	2

Goaltenders

Regular season
Player	GP	GS	TOI	W	L	OT	GA	GAA	SA	SV%	SO	G	A	PIM
Frederik Andersen	54	53	3106	35	12	5	123	2.38	1436	.914	3	0	3	4
John Gibson	23	21	1340	13	8	0	58	2.60	674	.914	1	0	0	0
Ilya Bryzgalov	8	6	329	1	4	1	23	4.19	150	.847	0	0	2	0
Jason LaBarbera	5	2	207	2	0	1	9	2.61	99	.909	0	0	0	0

Playoffs
Player	GP	GS	TOI	W	L	GA	GAA	SA	SV%	SO	G	A	PIM
Frederik Andersen	16	16	1050	11	5	41	2.34	472	.913	1	0	0	0

^{†}Denotes player spent time with another team before joining the Ducks. Stats reflect time with the Ducks only.
^{‡}Denotes player was traded mid-season. Stats reflect time with the Team only.
Bold/italics denotes franchise record.

=== Suspensions/fines ===
Player	Explanation	Length	Salary	Date issued
Sami Vatanen	Elbowing Toronto Maple Leafs forward David Booth during NHL Game No. 642 in Anaheim on Wednesday, January 14, 2015, at 9:35 of the third period.	–	$3,393.82	January 15, 2015

== Notable achievements ==
=== Awards ===
Regular season
Player	Award	Awarded
F. Andersen	NHL Second Star of the Week	October 20, 2014
C. Perry	NHL First Star of the Month	November 3, 2014
R. Getzlaf	NHL First Star of the Month	January 2, 2015
R. Getzlaf	NHL All-Star game selection	January 10, 2015
R. Getzlaf	NHL All-Star game assistant captain	January 14, 2015
C. Perry	NHL Second Star of the Week	February 9, 2015

=== Milestones ===
Regular season
Player	Milestone	Reached
W. Karlsson	1st career NHL game	October 11, 2014
W. Karlsson	1st career NHL goal 1st career NHL point	October 13, 2014
C. Wagner	1st career NHL game	October 17, 2014
W. Karlsson	1st career NHL assist	October 24, 2014
N. Thompson	400th career NHL game	October 26, 2014
R. Kesler	400th career NHL point	October 26, 2014
C. Fowler	100th career NHL assist	October 26, 2014
J. Manson	1st career NHL game	October 31, 2014
F. Beauchemin	200th career NHL point	November 2, 2014
J. Manson	1st career NHL assist 1st career NHL point	November 16, 2014
H. Lindholm	100th career NHL game	November 23, 2014
D. Smith-Pelly	100th career NHL game	December 5, 2014
P. Maroon	100th career NHL game	December 12, 2014
C. Fowler	300th career NHL game	December 22, 2014
M. Beleskey	300th career NHL game	December 22, 2014
M. Friberg	1st career NHL game	December 28, 2014
M. Beleskey	100th career NHL point	January 2, 2015
R. Kesler	700th career NHL game	January 16, 2015
R. Getzlaf	200th career NHL goal	February 8, 2015
C. Perry	300th career NHL assist	February 12, 2015
C. Perry	700th career NHL game	February 21, 2015
A. Cogliano	600th career NHL game	February 21, 2015
E. Etem	100th career NHL game	March 1, 2015
F. Andersen	50th career NHL win	March 3, 2015
N. Thompson	100th career NHL point	March 9, 2015
R. Getzlaf	700th career NHL game	March 13, 2015
R. Kesler	200th career NHL goal	March 18, 2015
C. Perry	600th career NHL point	April 1, 2015

== Transactions ==
Following the end of the Ducks' 2013–14 season, and during the 2014–15 season, this team has been involved in the following transactions:

=== Trades ===
Date	Details
June 27, 2014	To Vancouver Canucks Nick Bonino; Luca Sbisa; 1st-round pick in 2014; 3rd-round pick in 2014	To Anaheim Ducks Ryan Kesler; 3rd-round pick in 2015
June 30, 2014	To Tampa Bay Lightning 4th-round pick in 2015; 7th-round pick in 2015	To Anaheim Ducks Nate Thompson
November 20, 2014	To Montreal Canadiens Bryan Allen	To Anaheim Ducks Rene Bourque
November 28, 2014	To Tampa Bay Lightning EDM's 3rd-round pick in 2015	To Anaheim Ducks Eric Brewer
December 4, 2014	To Florida Panthers Jesse Blacker future conditional draft pick	To Anaheim Ducks Colby Robak
February 24, 2015	To Montreal Canadiens Devante Smith-Pelly	To Anaheim Ducks Jiri Sekac
February 28, 2015	To Florida Panthers Dany Heatley; 3rd-round pick in 2015	To Anaheim Ducks Tomas Fleischmann
March 2, 2015	To Columbus Blue Jackets Rene Bourque; William Karlsson; 2nd-round pick in 2015	To Anaheim Ducks James Wisniewski; DET's 3rd-round pick in 2015
March 2, 2015	To Pittsburgh Penguins Ben Lovejoy	To Anaheim Ducks Simon Despres
March 2, 2015	To Colorado Avalanche Mat Clark	To Anaheim Ducks Michael Sgarbossa
March 2, 2015	To Toronto Maple Leafs Eric Brewer; 5th-round pick in 2016	To Anaheim Ducks Korbinian Holzer

=== Free agents acquired ===
Date	Player	Former team	Contract terms (in U.S. dollars)	Ref
July 1, 2014	Clayton Stoner	Minnesota Wild	4 years, $13 million	
July 1, 2014	Jason LaBarbera	Chicago Blackhawks	1 year, $750,000	
July 9, 2014	Dany Heatley	Minnesota Wild	1 year, $1 million	
December 9, 2014	Ilya Bryzgalov	Minnesota Wild	1 year, $2.88 million	

=== Free agents lost ===
Date	Player	New team	Contract terms (in U.S. dollars)	Ref
July 1, 2014	Mathieu Perreault	Winnipeg Jets	3 years, $9 million	
July 1, 2014	Jonas Hiller	Calgary Flames	2 years, $9 million	
July 1, 2014	Stephane Robidas	Toronto Maple Leafs	3 years, $9 million	
July 1, 2014	Zack Stortini	Philadelphia Flyers	1 year, $575,000	
July 28, 2014	Daniel Winnik	Toronto Maple Leafs	1 year, $1.3 million	

=== Claimed via waivers ===
Player	Former team	Date claimed off waivers

=== Lost via waivers ===
Player	New team	Date claimed off waivers

=== Lost via retirement ===
Date	Player	Ref
May 17, 2014	Teemu Selanne	
September 10, 2014	Saku Koivu	

=== Player signings ===
The following players were signed by the Ducks. Two-way contracts are marked with an asterisk (*).

Date	Player	Contract terms (in U.S. dollars)	Ref
June 30, 2014	Igor Bobkov	1 year, $550,000	
July 10, 2014	Mat Clark	1 year, $550,000	
July 10, 2014	Jesse Blacker	1 year, $550,000	
July 11, 2014	Louis Leblanc	1 year, $550,000	
July 17, 2014	Antoine Laganiere	1 year, $550,000	
July 22, 2014	Sami Vatanen	2 years, $2.525 million	
August 2, 2014	Patrick Maroon	3 years, $6 million contract extension	
August 2, 2014	Nick Ritchie	3 years, entry-level contract	
August 15, 2014	Jakob Silfverberg	1 year, $850,500	
September 16, 2014	Devante Smith-Pelly	2 years, $1.6 million	
February 19, 2015	Tim Jackman	1 year, $700,000 contract extension	
March 16, 2015	Brandon Montour	3 years, entry-level contract	
May 14, 2015	Ondrej Kase	3 years, entry-level contract	
June 13, 2015	Marcus Pettersson	3 years, entry-level contract	
June 25, 2015	Max Friberg	2 years, contract extension	

Source: Transaction contract terms from Capgeek.com

== Draft picks ==
Below are the Anaheim Ducks' selections made at the 2014 NHL entry draft, held on June 27–28, 2014, at the Wells Fargo Center in Philadelphia, Pennsylvania. The team held the tenth overall pick due to a trade with the Ottawa Senators.

Round	#	Player	Pos	Nationality	College/Junior/Club team (League)
1	10^{a}	Nick Ritchie	LW	Canada	Peterborough Petes (OHL)
2	38^{b}	Marcus Pettersson	D	Sweden	Skelleftea AIK U20 (J20 SuperElit)
2	55	Brandon Montour	D	Canada	Waterloo Black Hawks (USHL)
5	123^{c}	Matthew Berkovitz	D	United States	Ashwaubenon Jaguars (WIAA)
7	205^{d}	Ondrej Kase	RW	Czech Republic	Pirati Chomutov (Czech Extraliga)

Draft notes

- ^{a} The Ottawa Senators' first-round pick went to the Anaheim Ducks as the result of trade on July 5, 2013, that sent Bobby Ryan to Ottawa in exchange for Jakob Silfverberg, Stefan Noesen and this pick.
- The Anaheim Ducks' first-round pick went to the Vancouver Canucks as the result of a trade on June 27, 2014, that sent Ryan Kesler and a third-round pick in 2015 to Anaheim in exchange for Nick Bonino, Luca Sbisa, a third-round pick in 2014 (85th overall) and this pick.
- ^{b} The Toronto Maple Leafs' second-round pick went to the Anaheim Ducks as the result of a trade on November 16, 2013, that sent Peter Holland and Brad Staubitz to Toronto in exchange for Jesse Blacker, Anaheim's seventh-round pick in 2014 and this pick (being conditional at the time of the trade). The condition – Anaheim will receive a second-round pick in 2014 if Holland plays in 25 or more games for the Maple Leafs during the 2013–14 NHL season – was converted on January 18, 2014.
- The Anaheim Ducks' third-round pick went to the New York Rangers as the result of a trade on June 27, 2014, that sent Derek Dorsett to Vancouver in exchange for this pick.
  Vancouver previously acquired this pick as the result of a trade on June 27, 2014, that sent Ryan Kesler and a third-round pick in 2015 to Anaheim in exchange for Nick Bonino, Luca Sbisa, a first-round pick in 2014 (24th overall) and this pick.
- The Anaheim Ducks' fourth-round pick went to the Dallas Stars as the result of a trade on March 4, 2014, that sent Stephane Robidas to Anaheim in exchange for this pick (being conditional at the time of the trade). The condition – Dallas will receive a third-round pick in 2014 if Anaheim advances to the 2014 Western Conference Final and Robidas plays in at least 50% of Anaheim's playoff games. If both conditions are not converted then this will remain a fourth-round pick. – was converted on April 21, 2014, when Robidas was injured for the remainder of the 2014 Stanley Cup playoffs.
  Anaheim previously re-acquired this pick as the result of a trade on March 4, 2014, that sent Dustin Penner to Washington in exchange for this pick.
  Washington previously acquired this pick as the result of a trade on September 29, 2013, that sent Mathieu Perreault to Anaheim in exchange for John Mitchell and this pick.
- ^{c} The Edmonton Oilers' fifth-round pick went to the Anaheim Ducks as the result of a trade on March 4, 2014, that sent Viktor Fasth to Edmonton in exchange for a third-round pick in 2015 and this pick.
- The Anaheim Ducks' fifth-round pick went to the Pittsburgh Penguins as the result of a trade on February 6, 2013, that sent Ben Lovejoy to Anaheim in exchange for this pick.
- The Anaheim Ducks' sixth-round pick went to the Calgary Flames as the result of a trade on November 21, 2013, that sent Tim Jackman to Anaheim in exchange for this pick.
- ^{d} The Anaheim Ducks' seventh-round pick was re-acquired as the result of a trade on November 16, 2013, that sent Peter Holland and Brad Staubitz to Toronto in exchange for Jesse Blacker, a conditional second-round pick in 2014 and this pick.
  Toronto previously acquired this pick as the result of a trade on March 15, 2013, that sent Dave Steckel to Anaheim in exchange for Ryan Lasch and this pick.
