= 2014–15 Florida Panthers season =

National Hockey League team season

2014–15 Florida Panthers
- Division: 6th Atlantic
- Conference: 10th Eastern
- 2014–15 record: 38–29–15
- Home record: 21–13–7
- Road record: 17–16–8
- Goals for: 206
- Goals against: 223

Team information
- General manager: Dale Tallon
- Coach: Gerard Gallant
- Captain: Willie Mitchell
- Alternate captains: Dave Bolland; Brian Campbell; Derek MacKenzie; Scottie Upshall
- Arena: BB&T Center
- Average attendance: 11,265 (66.1%) (41 games)

Team leaders
- Goals: Nick Bjugstad (24)
- Assists: Jonathan Huberdeau (39)
- Points: Jonathan Huberdeau (54)
- Penalty minutes: Erik Gudbranson (58)
- Plus/minus: Aaron Ekblad (+12)
- Wins: Roberto Luongo (28)
- Goals against average: Luongo, Ellis (2.35)

The 2014–15 Florida Panthers season was the 21st season for the National Hockey League (NHL) franchise that was established on June 14, 1993. The team missed the playoffs for the third year in a row for the first time since the 2008–09 season and the 2010–11 season.

== Off-season ==
On April 29, 2014, General Manager Dale Tallon relieved Interim Head Coach Peter Horachek of his duties, and announced that the Panthers were looking to hire a new head coach with NHL experience prior to June 27, 2014, when the 2014 NHL entry draft will be held.

=== Training camp ===
The Panthers will play in six pre-season exhibition games before the start of the 2014–15 regular season.

== Memorable events ==
On March 3, 2015, in a game against the Toronto Maple Leafs goaltender Roberto Luongo suffered an injury and was forced to leave the game; he was replaced by backup Al Montoya. Later in the same game, however, Montoya also suffered an injury. Without another available goaltender (NHL teams seldom have a third goaltender on the roster), Montoya attempted to continue playing with the injury while the team debated their options, reportedly considered between either having forward Derek MacKenzie play the position or calling on a "local" goaltender. Forty-one-year-old Goaltending Coach Rob Tallas subsequently dressed in goaltending gear, registered with the team's roster and began warming up in the dressing room tunnel in preparation to enter the game as an emergency backup, but before entering the game, however, Luongo was able to return and finish the remainder of the game. Allegedly, Luongo was at the hospital when Montoya was injured and was rushed back to the arena. This marked the second such instance for Tallas being called in as an emergency backup, with the other occurrence happening the previous season and also preventing him from officially entering the game as the original goaltender returned. Had he played, it would have been his first appearance in an NHL game in 14 years. The incident has reportedly lead the NHL to consider reviewing its rules for "emergency" players and led the Panthers to hold open tryouts for a "fill-in" goaltender.

== Standings ==
Atlantic Division
Pos	Team	GP	W	L	OTL	ROW	GF	GA	GD	Pts
1	y – Montreal Canadiens	82	50	22	10	43	221	189	+32	110
2	x – Tampa Bay Lightning	82	50	24	8	47	262	211	+51	108
3	x – Detroit Red Wings	82	43	25	14	39	235	221	+14	100
4	x – Ottawa Senators	82	43	26	13	37	238	215	+23	99
5	Boston Bruins	82	41	27	14	37	213	211	+2	96
6	Florida Panthers	82	38	29	15	30	206	223	−17	91
7	Toronto Maple Leafs	82	30	44	8	25	211	262	−51	68
8	Buffalo Sabres	82	23	51	8	15	161	274	−113	54

Source: National Hockey League
x – Clinched playoff spot; y – Clinched division

Eastern Conference Wild Card
Pos	Div	Team	GP	W	L	OTL	ROW	GF	GA	GD	Pts
1	AT	x – Ottawa Senators	82	43	26	13	37	238	215	+23	99
2	ME	x – Pittsburgh Penguins	82	43	27	12	39	221	210	+11	98
3	AT	Boston Bruins	82	41	27	14	37	213	211	+2	96
4	AT	Florida Panthers	82	38	29	15	30	206	223	−17	91
5	ME	Columbus Blue Jackets	82	42	35	5	33	236	250	−14	89
6	ME	Philadelphia Flyers	82	33	31	18	30	215	234	−19	84
7	ME	New Jersey Devils	82	32	36	14	27	181	216	−35	78
8	ME	Carolina Hurricanes	82	30	41	11	25	188	226	−38	71
9	AT	Toronto Maple Leafs	82	30	44	8	25	211	262	−51	68
10	AT	Buffalo Sabres	82	23	51	8	15	161	274	−113	54

Source: National Hockey League
x – Clinched playoff spot

== Suspensions/fines ==
Player	Explanation	Length	Salary	Date issued
Vincent Trocheck	Diving/Embellishment during NHL Game No. 577 in Washington on Sunday, January 4, 2015, at 11:04 of the third period.	—	$2,000.00	January 7, 2015
Dmitri Kulikov	Clipping Dallas Stars forward Tyler Seguin during NHL game No. 820 in Dallas on Friday, February 13, 2015, at 13:05 of the third period.	4 games	$93,189.96	February 16, 2015

== Schedule and results ==
=== Pre-season ===
2014 preseason game log: 0–4–2 (Home: 0–1–1; Road: 0–3–1)
#	Date	Visitor	Score	Home	OT	Decision	Attendance	Record	Recap
1	September 24	Dallas	4–3	Florida	SO	Houser	2,841	0–0–1	Recap
2	September 27	Florida	1–2	Nashville	SO	Montoya	12,700	0–0–2	Recap
3	September 27	Florida	1–4	Nashville		Luongo	15,741	0–1–2	Recap
4	September 29	Florida	4–5	Dallas		Luongo	14,234	0–2–2	Recap
5	October 2	Tampa Bay	0–3	Florida		Luongo	2,859	0–3–2	Recap
6	October 4	Florida	1–4	Tampa Bay		Montoya	15,411	0–4–2	Recap

=== Regular season ===
2014–15 Game Log

October: 3–2–3 (Home: 1–2–0; Road: 2–0–3)
#	Date	Visitor	Score	Home	OT	Decision	Attendance	Record	Pts	Recap
1	October 9	Florida	2–3	Tampa Bay	OT	Luongo	19,204	0–0–1	1	Recap
2	October 11	New Jersey	5–1	Florida		Luongo	11,419	0–1–1	1	Recap
3	October 13	Ottawa	1–0	Florida		Luongo	7,311	0–2–1	1	Recap
4	October 17	Florida	1–0	Buffalo		Luongo	17,864	1–2–1	3	Recap
5	October 18	Florida	1–2	Washington		Montoya	18,506	1–2–2	4	Recap
6	October 21	Florida	4–3	Colorado	OT	Luongo	14,440	2–2–2	6	Recap
7	October 25	Florida	1–2	Arizona	OT	Luongo	13,202	2–2–3	7	Recap
8	October 30	Arizona	1–2	Florida		Luongo	7,691	3–2–3	9	Recap

November: 6–4–3 (Home: 3–2–1; Road: 3–1–2)
#	Date	Visitor	Score	Home	OT	Decision	Attendance	Record	Pts	Recap
9	November 1	Philadelphia	1–2	Florida		Luongo	9,774	4–2–3	11	Recap
10	November 4	Florida	1–2	Boston	OT	Luongo	17,565	4–2–4	12	Recap
11	November 6	Florida	1–4	Philadelphia		Luongo	19,777	4–3–4	12	Recap
12	November 8	Calgary	6–4	Florida		Montoya	9,230	4–4–4	12	Recap
13	November 11	San Jose	4–1	Florida		Luongo	8,075	5–4–4	14	Recap
14	November 14	NY Islanders	4–3	Florida	SO	Luongo	10,010	5–4–5	15	Recap
15	November 16	Florida	6–2	Anaheim		Montoya	16,128	6–4–5	17	Recap
16	November 18	Florida	2–5	Los Angeles		Luongo	18,230	6–5–5	17	Recap
17	November 20	Florida	3–2	San Jose	SO	Luongo	17,331	7–5–5	19	Recap
18	November 22	Florida	2–3	Nashville	SO	Luongo	17,163	7–5–6	20	Recap
19	November 24	Minnesota	4–1	Florida		Luongo	8,426	7–6–6	20	Recap
20	November 26	Carolina	0–1	Florida		Luongo	8,119	8–6–6	22	Recap
21	November 28	Ottawa	2–3	Florida		Montoya	9,758	9–6–6	24	Recap

December: 7–4–3 (Home: 4–1–2; Road: 3–3–1)
#	Date	Visitor	Score	Home	OT	Decision	Attendance	Record	Pts	Recap
22	December 1	Florida	1–2	Columbus		Montoya	12,309	9–7–6	24	Recap
23	December 2	Florida	4–3	Detroit		Luongo	20,027	10–7–6	26	Recap
24	December 4	Columbus	4–3	Florida	SO	Luongo	7,788	10–7–7	27	Recap
25	December 6	Buffalo	2–3	Florida		Luongo	8,597	11–7–7	29	Recap
26	December 8	Florida	2–4	St. Louis		Luongo	17,330	11–8–7	29	Recap
27	December 12	Florida	3–2	Detroit	SO	Luongo	20,027	12–8–7	31	Recap
28	December 13	Florida	3–4	Buffalo	SO	Montoya	18,450	12–8–8	32	Recap
29	December 16	Washington	1–2	Florida	SO*	Luongo	10,012	13–8–8	34	Recap
30	December 18	Florida	2–1	Philadelphia	SO	Luongo	19,582	14–8–8	36	Recap
31	December 20	Florida	1–3	Pittsburgh		Luongo	18,668	14–9–8	36	Recap
32	December 22	Pittsburgh	3–4	Florida	SO	Luongo	15,947	15–9–8	38	Recap
33	December 28	Toronto	4–6	Florida		Luongo	17,877	16–9–8	40	Recap
34	December 30	Montreal	2–1	Florida	SO	Luongo	19,614	16–9–9	41	Recap
35	December 31	NY Rangers	5–2	Florida		Montoya	15,090	16–10–9	41	Recap
* The shootout between the Panthers and the Washington Capitals on December 16, 2014, was the longest to date in NHL history, at 20 rounds.

January: 5–6–1 (Home: 1–3–1; Road: 4–3–0)
#	Date	Visitor	Score	Home	OT	Decision	Attendance	Record	Pts	Recap
36	January 2	Florida	2–0	Buffalo		Luongo	19,070	17–10–9	43	Recap
37	January 4	Florida	3–4	Washington		Montoya	18,506	17–11–9	43	Recap
38	January 8	Florida	3–1	Vancouver		Luongo	18,799	18–11–9	45	Recap
39	January 9	Florida	6–5	Calgary		Montoya	19,289	19–11–9	47	Recap
40	January 11	Florida	4–2	Edmonton		Luongo	16,839	20–11–9	49	Recap
41	January 13	Florida	2–8	Winnipeg		Luongo	15,016	20–12–9	49	Recap
42	January 15	Colorado	4–2	Florida		Luongo	9,584	20–13–9	49	Recap
43	January 17	Edmonton	3–2	Florida	SO	Luongo	10,529	20–13–10	50	Recap
44	January 19	Vancouver	2–1	Florida		Luongo	9,373	20–14–10	50	Recap
45	January 27	Detroit	5–4	Florida		Luongo	12,190	20–15–10	50	Recap
46	January 29	Columbus	2–3	Florida		Luongo	7,917	21–15–10	52	Recap
47	January 31	Florida	1–3	New Jersey		Luongo	16,278	21–16–10	52	Recap

February: 6–6–3 (Home: 3–1–2; Road: 3–5–1)
#	Date	Visitor	Score	Home	OT	Decision	Attendance	Record	Pts	Recap
48	February 2	Florida	3–6	NY Rangers		Luongo	18,006	21–17–10	52	Recap
49	February 3	Florida	4–2	NY Islanders		Montoya	14,704	22–17–10	54	Recap
50	February 5	Los Angeles	2–3	Florida		Luongo	9,624	23–17–10	56	Recap
51	February 8	Nashville	3–2	Florida	SO	Luongo	10,844	23–17–11	57	Recap
52	February 10	Anaheim	2–6	Florida		Luongo	8,576	24–17–11	59	Recap
53	February 12	Florida	1–2	Minnesota		Luongo	19,055	24–18–11	59	Recap
54	February 13	Florida	0–2	Dallas		Montoya	18,211	24–19–11	59	Recap
55	February 15	St. Louis	2–1	Florida	SO	Luongo	11,859	24–19–12	60	Recap
56	February 17	Florida	3–2	Toronto		Luongo	19,098	25–19–12	62	Recap
57	February 19	Florida	3–2	Montreal	SO	Luongo	21,286	26–19–12	64	Recap
58	February 21	Florida	1–4	Ottawa		Luongo	16,938	26–20–12	64	Recap
59	February 22	Florida	1–5	Pittsburgh		Montoya	18,592	26–21–12	64	Recap
60	February 24	Florida	2–3	Chicago	SO	Luongo	21,526	26–21–13	65	Recap
61	February 26	Chicago	3–0	Florida		Luongo	17,387	26–22–13	65	Recap
62	February 28	Buffalo	3–5	Florida		Luongo	10,374	27–22–13	67	Recap

March: 8–5–2 (Home: 5–2–1; Road: 3–3–1)
#	Date	Visitor	Score	Home	OT	Decision	Attendance	Record	Pts	Recap
63	March 1	Tampa Bay	3–4	Florida		Montoya	10,336	28–22–13	69	Recap
64	March 3	Toronto	3–2	Florida		Montoya	10,198	28–23–13	69	Recap
65	March 5	Dallas	4–3	Florida	SO	Ellis	8,510	28–23–14	70	Recap
66	March 7	NY Islanders	3–4	Florida	SO	Ellis	14,474	29–23–14	72	Recap
67	March 12	Winnipeg	2–4	Florida		Ellis	9,819	30–23–14	74	Recap
68	March 14	Florida	2–0	Carolina		Ellis	11,790	31–23–14	76	Recap
69	March 15	Florida	1–2	NY Rangers		Ellis	18,006	31–24–14	76	Recap
70	March 17	Montreal	3–2	Florida		Ellis	18,245	31–25–14	76	Recap
71	March 19	Detroit	1–3	Florida		Luongo	11,458	32–25–14	78	Recap
72	March 21	Boston	1–2	Florida	SO	Luongo	17,044	33–25–14	80	Recap
73	March 24	Florida	3–4	Tampa Bay		Luongo	18,729	33–26–14	80	Recap
74	March 26	Florida	4–1	Toronto		Luongo	18,831	34–26–14	82	Recap
75	March 28	Florida	2–3	Montreal	OT	Luongo	21,287	34–26–15	83	Recap
76	March 29	Florida	4–2	Ottawa		Ellis	19,045	35–26–15	85	Recap
77	March 31	Florida	2–3	Boston		Luongo	17,565	35–27–15	85	Recap

April: 3–2–0 (Home: 3–2–0; Road: 0–0–0)
#	Date	Visitor	Score	Home	OT	Decision	Attendance	Record	Pts	Recap
78	April 2	Carolina	1–6	Florida		Luongo	9,827	36–27–15	87	Recap
79	April 4	Tampa Bay	4–0	Florida		Luongo	11,072	36–28–15	87	Recap
80	April 5	Montreal	4–1	Florida		Ellis	14,112	36–29–15	87	Recap
81	April 9	Boston	2–4	Florida		Luongo	11,778	37–29–15	89	Recap
82	April 11	New Jersey	2–3	Florida		Montoya	12,236	38–29–15	91	Recap

Legend: Win (2 points) Loss (0 points) Overtime/shootout loss (1 point)

== Playoffs ==
Despite having 91 points, the Panthers failed to qualify for the playoffs for the third consecutive year.

== Player stats ==
Final stats

Skaters

Regular season
Player	GP	G	A	Pts	+/−	PIM
Jonathan Huberdeau	79	15	39	54	10	38
Jussi Jokinen	81	8	36	44	−2	34
Nick Bjugstad	72	24	19	43	−7	38
Aaron Ekblad	81	12	27	39	12	32
Brad Boyes	78	14	24	38	11	20
Aleksander Barkov	71	16	20	36	−4	16
Jimmy Hayes	72	19	16	35	−4	20
Brian Campbell	82	3	24	27	4	22
Brandon Pirri	49	22	2	24	6	14
Dave Bolland	53	6	17	23	4	48
Vincent Trocheck	50	7	15	22	9	24
Dmitri Kulikov	73	3	19	22	0	48
Tomas Fleischmann^{‡}	52	7	14	21	12	8
Sean Bergenheim^{‡}	39	8	10	18	2	34
Jaromir Jagr^{†}	20	6	12	18	7	6
Scottie Upshall	63	8	7	15	−8	28
Erik Gudbranson	76	4	9	13	−4	58
Derek MacKenzie	82	5	6	11	−17	45
Willie Mitchell	66	3	5	8	1	25
Tomas Kopecky	64	2	6	8	−19	28
Dylan Olsen	44	2	6	8	−7	20
Shawn Thornton	46	1	4	5	−13	50
Steven Kampfer	25	2	2	4	−4	12
Alex Petrovic	33	0	3	3	−4	34
Rocco Grimaldi	7	1	0	1	1	4
Shane O'Brien	9	0	1	1	−4	5
Garrett Wilson	2	0	0	0	−2	0
Colby Robak^{‡}	7	0	0	0	−1	2

Goaltenders

Regular season
Player	GP	GS	TOI	W	L	OT	GA	GAA	SA	SV%	SO	G	A	PIM
Roberto Luongo	61	61	3528	28	19	12	138	2.35	1743	0.921	2	0	0	0
Al Montoya	20	13	977	6	7	2	49	3.01	453	0.892	0	0	0	2
Dan Ellis	8	8	486	4	3	1	19	2.35	221	0.914	1	0	0	0

^{†}Denotes player spent time with another team before joining the Panthers. Stats reflect time with the Panthers only.
^{‡}Denotes player was traded mid-season. Stats reflect time with the Panthers only.
Bold/italics denotes franchise record.

== Notable achievements ==
=== Awards ===
Regular season
Player	Award	Awarded
Aaron Ekblad	NHL Third Star of the Week	December 8, 2014
Jonathan Huberdeau	NHL Third Star of the Week	January 12, 2015
Roberto Luongo	NHL All-Star game selection	January 10, 2015
Aaron Ekblad	NHL All-Star Game rookie selection	January 10, 2015

=== Milestones ===
Regular season
Player	Milestone	Reached
A. Ekblad	1st Career NHL Game; 1st Career NHL Assist; 1st Career NHL Point	October 9, 2014
D. Kulikov	100th Career NHL Point	October 17, 2014
W. Mitchell	800th Career NHL Game	October 18, 2014
R. Grimaldi	1st Career NHL Game	November 1, 2014
A. Ekblad	1st Career NHL Goal	November 1, 2014
S. Upshall	500th Career NHL Game	November 4, 2014
J. Hayes	100th Career NHL Game	November 4, 2014
N. Bjugstad	100th Career NHL Game	November 11, 2014
B. Boyes	700th Career NHL Game	November 18, 2014
R. Grimaldi	1st Career NHL Goal; 1st Career NHL Point	November 22, 2014
A. Montoya	100th Career NHL Game	December 13, 2014
D. Olsen	100th Career NHL Game	December 16, 2014
E. Gudbranson	200th Career NHL Game	December 20, 2014
J. Jokinen	700th Career NHL Game	January 13, 2015
T. Fleischmann	300th Career NHL Point	February 10, 2015
A. Barkov	100th Career NHL Game	February 19, 2015
B. Campbell	900th Career NHL Game	February 28, 2015
B. Boyes	200th Career NHL Goal	March 1, 2015
J. Huberdeau	100th Career NHL Point	March 12, 2015
S. Thornton	600th Career NHL Game	March 21, 2015
D. Bolland	400th Career NHL Game	March 26, 2015
D. Bolland	200th Career NHL Point	March 29, 2015
B. Pirri	100th Career NHL Game	April 2, 2015
R. Luongo	400th Career NHL Win	April 2, 2015
J. Jagr	1,800th Career NHL Point	April 9, 2015
J. Jokinen	300th Career NHL Assist	April 9, 2015

== Transactions ==
The Panthers have been involved in the following transactions during the 2014–15 season:

=== Trades ===
Date	Details
June 28, 2014	To New York Islanders 3rd-round pick in 2015	To Florida Panthers 3rd-round pick in 2014
October 6, 2014	To New York Rangers Joey Crabb	To Florida Panthers Steven Kampfer; Andrew Yogan
December 4, 2014	To Anaheim Ducks Colby Robak	To Florida Panthers Jesse Blacker future conditional draft pick
January 9, 2015	To Calgary Flames Drew Shore	To Florida Panthers Corban Knight
February 24, 2015	To Minnesota Wild Sean Bergenheim; 7th-round pick in 2016	To Florida Panthers 3rd-round pick in 2016
February 26, 2015	To New Jersey Devils 2nd-round pick in 2015; Conditional 3rd-round pick in 2016	To Florida Panthers Jaromir Jagr
February 28, 2015	To Anaheim Ducks Tomas Fleischmann	To Florida Panthers Dany Heatley; 3rd-round pick in 2015
June 19, 2015	To Toronto Maple Leafs Zach Hyman; Conditional 7th-round pick in 2017	To Florida Panthers Greg McKegg

=== Free agents acquired ===
Date	Player	Former team	Contract terms (in U.S. dollars)	Ref
July 1, 2014	Al Montoya	Winnipeg Jets	2 years, $2.1 million	
July 1, 2014	Derek MacKenzie	Columbus Blue Jackets	3 years, $3.9 million	
July 1, 2014	Shawn Thornton	Boston Bruins	2 years, $2.4 million	
July 1, 2014	Dave Bolland	Toronto Maple Leafs	5 years, $27.5 million	
July 1, 2014	Jussi Jokinen	Pittsburgh Penguins	4 years, $16 million	
July 1, 2014	Willie Mitchell	Los Angeles Kings	2 years, $8.5 million	
July 1, 2014	Blake Parlett	Providence Bruins	1 year, $575,000	
July 4, 2014	Brett Olson	Abbotsford Heat	1 year, $550,000	
July 4, 2014	Greg Zanon	San Antonio Rampage	1 year, $600,000	
October 6, 2014	Shane O'Brien	Calgary Flames	1 year, $650,000	
March 20, 2015	Colin Stevens	Union College	entry-level contract	
June 1, 2015	Chase Balisy	St. John's IceCaps	entry-level contract	

=== Free agents lost ===
Date	Player	New team	Contract terms (in U.S. dollars)	Ref
July 1, 2014	Tom Gilbert	Montreal Canadiens	2 years, $5.6 million	
July 1, 2014	Scott Clemmensen	New Jersey Devils	1 year, $600,000	
July 1, 2014	Jesse Winchester	Colorado Avalanche	2 years, $1.8 million	
December 1, 2014	Scott Gomez	New Jersey Devils	1 year, $550,000	

=== Claimed via waivers ===
Player	Former team	Date claimed off waivers

=== Lost via waivers ===
Player	New team	Date claimed off waivers

=== Lost via retirement ===
Player

=== Players released ===
Date	Player	Via	Ref
June 30, 2014	Ed Jovanovski	Compliance buyout	

=== Player signings ===
Date	Player	Contract terms (in U.S. dollars)	Ref
July 2, 2014	Sam Brittain	2 year, $1.51 million entry-level contract	
July 10, 2014	Erik Gudbranson	2 years, $5 million	
July 14, 2014	Dylan Olsen	2 years, $1.55 million	
July 14, 2014	Garrett Wilson	1 year, $715,000	
July 14, 2014	Ryan Martindale	1 year, $715,000	
July 16, 2014	Brandon Pirri	2 years, $1.85 million	
July 18, 2014	Dmitri Kulikov	3 years, $13 million	
July 29, 2014	Jimmy Hayes	1 year, $925,000	
September 3, 2014	Aaron Ekblad	3 years, $11.325 million entry-level contract	
March 14, 2015	Steven Kampfer	2 years, contract extension	
March 29, 2015	Kyle Rau	entry-level contract	
April 1, 2015	Mike Matheson	entry-level contract	
April 9, 2015	Josh Brown	entry-level contract	
April 12, 2015	Jaromir Jagr	1 year	
May 28, 2015	Brett Olson	1 year	

== Draft picks ==
The 2014 NHL entry draft was held on June 27–28, 2014 at the Wells Fargo Center in Philadelphia, Pennsylvania. On April 15, 2014, the Panthers won the draft lottery to jump ahead of the Buffalo Sabres and secure the first selection in the draft.

Round	#	Player	Pos	Nationality	College/Junior/Club team (League)
1	1	Aaron Ekblad	D	Canada	Barrie Colts (OHL)
2	32	Jayce Hawryluk	RW	Canada	Brandon Wheat Kings (WHL)
3	65^{[a]}	Juho Lammikko	RW	Finland	Assat U20 (FIN U20)
4	92	Joe Wegwerth	RW	United States	USA U-18 (USHL)
5	143^{[b]}	Miguel Fidler	LW	United States	Edina Hornets (MSHSL)
7	182^{[c]}	Hugo Fagerblom	G	Sweden	Sweden Jr. U18

Draft notes

- The Florida Panthers' third-round pick went to the Nashville Predators as the result of a trade on June 28, 2014, that sent a third and fourth-round pick (72nd and 102nd overall) both in 2014 to San Jose in exchange for this pick.
  San Jose previously acquired this pick as the result of a trade on June 27, 2014, that sent a first-round pick and the Rangers sixth-round pick both in 2014 (20th and 179th overall) to Chicago in exchange for a first-round pick in 2014 (27th overall) and this pick.
  Chicago previously acquired this pick as the result of a trade on March 2, 2014, that sent Brandon Pirri to Florida in exchange for a fifth-round pick in 2016 and this pick.
- ^{[a]}The New York Islanders' third-round pick went to the Florida Panthers as the result of a trade on June 28, 2014, that sent a third-round pick in 2015 to New York in exchange for this pick.
- Florida's fifth-round pick went to the New York Rangers, as the result of a trade on July 20, 2012, that sent Casey Wellman to Florida, in exchange for this pick.
- ^{[b]}The Pittsburgh Penguins' fifth-round pick went to the Florida Panthers as the result of a trade on March 5, 2014, that sent Marcel Goc to Pittsburgh in exchange for a third-round pick in 2015 and this pick.
- Florida's sixth-round pick went to the New Jersey Devils, as the result of a trade on September 28, 2013, that sent Krys Barch and St. Louis' seventh-round pick in 2015 to Florida, in exchange for Scott Timmins and this pick.
- ^{[c]}The Florida Panthers' seventh-round pick was re-acquired as the result of a trade on July 5, 2013, that sent George Parros to Montreal in exchange for Philippe Lefebvre and this pick.
  Montreal previously acquired this pick as the result of a trade on June 30, 2013, that sent a seventh-round pick in 2013 to Florida in exchange for this pick.
