= 2014–15 San Jose Sharks season =

National Hockey League team season

2014–15 San Jose Sharks
- Division: 5th Pacific
- Conference: 12th Western
- 2014–15 record: 40–33–9
- Home record: 19–17–5
- Road record: 21–16–4
- Goals for: 228
- Goals against: 232

Team information
- General manager: Doug Wilson
- Coach: Todd McLellan
- Captain: Vacant
- Alternate captains: Patrick Marleau; Joe Pavelski; Joe Thornton; Marc-Edouard Vlasic
- Arena: SAP Center
- Average attendance: 18,707

Team leaders
- Goals: Joe Pavelski (37)
- Assists: Joe Thornton (49)
- Points: Joe Pavelski (70)
- Penalty minutes: John Scott (87)
- Plus/minus: Joe Pavelski; Marc-Edouard Vlasic (+12)
- Wins: Antti Niemi (31)
- Goals against average: Troy Grosenick (1.53)

The 2014–15 San Jose Sharks season was the 24th season in the National Hockey League (NHL). The Sharks did not qualify for the 2015 Stanley Cup playoffs, thus ending their ten-season playoff streak. This is the only season in the span between the 2003–04 and 2018–19 seasons in which the Sharks missed the playoffs (not counting the cancelled 2004–05 season).

== Off-season ==
On May 15, 2014, following a first round playoff loss to the Los Angeles Kings, General Manager Doug Wilson made known his intentions to build a "younger, more aggressive team", announcing that the team would retain Head Coach Todd McLellan, but will move 33-year-old winger Martin Havlat, who still had one year remaining on his contract, and would not re-sign 37-year-old impending unrestricted free agent defenceman Dan Boyle. The Sharks also acquired John Scott and Tye McGinn.

== Regular season ==
The Sharks did not qualify for the Stanley Cup playoffs for the first time since 2002–03, ending the second-longest active NHL playoff appearance streak at ten seasons.

== Standings ==
Pacific Division
Pos	Team	GP	W	L	OTL	ROW	GF	GA	GD	Pts
1	z – Anaheim Ducks	82	51	24	7	43	236	226	+10	109
2	x – Vancouver Canucks	82	48	29	5	42	242	222	+20	101
3	x – Calgary Flames	82	45	30	7	41	241	216	+25	97
4	Los Angeles Kings	82	40	27	15	38	220	205	+15	95
5	San Jose Sharks	82	40	33	9	36	228	232	−4	89
6	Edmonton Oilers	82	24	44	14	19	198	283	−85	62
7	Arizona Coyotes	82	24	50	8	19	170	272	−102	56

Source: National Hockey League
x – Clinched playoff spot; z – Clinched conference

Western Conference Wild Card
Pos	Div	Team	GP	W	L	OTL	ROW	GF	GA	GD	Pts
1	CE	x – Minnesota Wild	82	46	28	8	42	231	201	+30	100
2	CE	x – Winnipeg Jets	82	43	26	13	36	230	210	+20	99
3	PA	Los Angeles Kings	82	40	27	15	38	220	205	+15	95
4	CE	Dallas Stars	82	41	31	10	37	261	260	+1	92
5	CE	Colorado Avalanche	82	39	31	12	29	219	227	−8	90
6	PA	San Jose Sharks	82	40	33	9	36	228	232	−4	89
7	PA	Edmonton Oilers	82	24	44	14	19	198	283	−85	62
8	PA	Arizona Coyotes	82	24	50	8	19	170	272	−102	56

Source: National Hockey League
x – Clinched playoff spot

== Schedule and results ==
=== Pre-season ===
The pre-season schedule was announced on June 19.

Pre-season game log: 3–2–2 (home: 2–1–1; road: 1–1–1)
#	Date	Visitor	Score	Home	OT	Decision	Attendance	Record	Recap
1^{[a]}	September 23	Vancouver	2–5	San Jose		Grosenick	6,810	1–0–0	Recap
2	September 23	San Jose	2–4	Vancouver		Stalock	13,650	1–1–0	Recap
3	September 26	Arizona	2–1	San Jose	SO	Niemi	15,452	1–1–1	Recap
4	September 27	Anaheim	1–3	San Jose		Stalock	16,248	2–1–1	Recap
5	September 30	Los Angeles	4–1	San Jose		Niemi	16,251	2–2–1	Recap
6	October 3	San Jose	3–1	Arizona		Stalock	7,873	3–2–1	Recap
7	October 4	San Jose	1–2	Anaheim	OT	Niemi	13,682	3–2–2	Recap
Notes:^{a} Game was played at Stockton Arena in Stockton, California.

=== Regular season ===
The regular season schedule was announced on June 22.

Game log 40–33–9 (home: 19–17–5; road: 21–16–4)

October: 6–4–2 (home: 1–2–0; road: 5–2–2)
#	Date	Visitor	Score	Home	OT	Decision	Attendance	Record	Pts	Recap
1	October 8	San Jose	4–0	Los Angeles		Niemi	18,514	1–0–0	2	Recap
2	October 11	Winnipeg	0–3	San Jose		Stalock	17,562	2–0–0	4	Recap
3	October 14	San Jose	6–5	Washington	SO	Niemi	18,506	3–0–0	6	Recap
4	October 16	San Jose	3–4	NY Islanders	SO	Stalock	11,248	3–0–1	7	Recap
5	October 18	San Jose	4–2	New Jersey		Niemi	16,592	4–0–1	9	Recap
6	October 19	San Jose	0–4	NY Rangers		Stalock	18,006	4–1–1	9	Recap
7	October 21	San Jose	3–5	Boston		Niemi	17,565	4–2–1	9	Recap
8	October 23	Columbus	5–4	San Jose		Niemi	17,562	4–3–1	9	Recap
9	October 25	Buffalo	2–1	San Jose		Stalock	17,370	4–4–1	9	Recap
10	October 26	San Jose	4–1	Anaheim		Niemi	16,954	5–4–1	11	Recap
11	October 28	San Jose	3–2	Colorado	SO	Niemi	14,552	6–4–1	13	Recap
12	October 30	San Jose	3–4	Minnesota	SO	Niemi	18,633	6–4–2	14	Recap

November: 5–6–2 (home: 2–2–2; road: 3–4–0)
#	Date	Visitor	Score	Home	OT	Decision	Attendance	Record	Pts	Recap
13	November 1	NY Islanders	1–3	San Jose		Niemi	17,562	7–4–2	16	Recap
14	November 6	Vancouver	3–2	San Jose		Niemi	17,562	7–5–2	16	Recap
15	November 8	San Jose	5–3	Dallas		Stalock	17,023	8–5–2	18	Recap
16	November 9	San Jose	2–5	Chicago		Niemi	21,489	8–6–2	18	Recap
17	November 11	San Jose	1–4	Florida		Niemi	8,075	8–7–2	18	Recap
18	November 13	San Jose	2–1	Tampa Bay		Niemi	19,004	9–7–2	20	Recap
19	November 15	San Jose	1–2	Columbus		Niemi	15,950	9–8–2	20	Recap
20	November 16	San Jose	2–0	Carolina		Grosenick	12,784	10–8–2	22	Recap
21	November 18	San Jose	1–4	Buffalo		Grosenick	17,435	10–9–2	22	Recap
22	November 20	Florida	3–2	San Jose	SO	Niemi	17,331	10–9–3	23	Recap
23	November 22	Arizona	4–3	San Jose	SO	Niemi	17,297	10–9–4	24	Recap
24	November 26	Calgary	2–0	San Jose		Niemi	17,353	10–10–4	24	Recap
25	November 29	Anaheim	4–6	San Jose		Niemi	17,352	11–10–4	26	Recap

December: 10–3–1 (home: 8–1–0; road: 2–2–1)
#	Date	Visitor	Score	Home	OT	Decision	Attendance	Record	Pts	Recap
26	December 2	Philadelphia	1–2	San Jose		Niemi	17,159	12–10–4	28	Recap
27	December 4	Boston	4–7	San Jose		Niemi	17,404	13–10–4	30	Recap
28	December 6	San Jose	3–2	Calgary		Niemi	18,818	14–10–4	32	Recap
29	December 7	San Jose	1–2	Edmonton		Stalock	16,839	14–11–4	32	Recap
30	December 9	Edmonton	2–5	San Jose		Stalock	17,007	15–11–4	34	Recap
31	December 11	Minnesota	1–2	San Jose		Stalock	17,097	16–11–4	36	Recap
32	December 13	Nashville	0–2	San Jose		Niemi	17,059	17–11–4	38	Recap
33	December 18	Edmonton	3–4	San Jose		Niemi	17,399	18–11–4	40	Recap
34	December 20	St. Louis	2–3	San Jose	OT	Niemi	17,562	19–11–4	42	Recap
35	December 22	San Jose	2–3	Anaheim	OT	Niemi	17,405	19–11–5	43	Recap
36	December 27	San Jose	1–3	Los Angeles		Niemi	18,451	19–12–5	43	Recap
37	December 30	Vancouver	3–1	San Jose		Stalock	17,562	19–13–5	43	Recap
38	December 31	San Jose	3–0	Anaheim		Niemi	17,174	20–13–5	45	Recap

January: 7–4–1 (home: 4–3–1; road: 3–1–0)
#	Date	Visitor	Score	Home	OT	Decision	Attendance	Record	Pts	Recap
39	January 3	St. Louis	7–2	San Jose		Niemi	17,562	20–14–5	45	Recap
40	January 5	San Jose	3–2	Winnipeg		Niemi	15,016	21–14–5	47	Recap
41	January 6	San Jose	4–3	Minnesota	OT	Stalock	19,043	22–14–5	49	Recap
42	January 8	San Jose	2–7	St. Louis		Niemi	19,220	22–15–5	49	Recap
43	January 10	NY Rangers	3–1	San Jose		Niemi	17,562	22–16–5	49	Recap
44	January 13	San Jose	3–2	Arizona		Niemi	10,631	23–16–5	51	Recap
45	January 15	Toronto	1–3	San Jose		Niemi	17,562	24–16–5	53	Recap
46	January 17	Calgary	4–3	San Jose	OT	Niemi	17,562	24–16–6	54	Recap
47	January 19	New Jersey	5–2	San Jose		Stalock	17,562	24–17–6	54	Recap
48	January 21	Los Angeles	2–4	San Jose		Niemi	17,562	25–17–6	56	Recap
49	January 29	Anaheim	3–6	San Jose		Niemi	17,562	26–17–6	58	Recap
50	January 31	Chicago	0–2	San Jose		Niemi	17,562	27–17–6	60	Recap

February: 3–7–2 (home: 0–5–2; road: 3–2–0)
#	Date	Visitor	Score	Home	OT	Decision	Attendance	Record	Pts	Recap
51	February 2	Edmonton	5–4	San Jose	SO	Niemi	17,376	27–17–7	61	Recap
52	February 4	San Jose	1–3	Calgary		Stalock	18,781	27–18–7	61	Recap
53	February 5	San Jose	5–1	Vancouver		Niemi	18,508	28–18–7	63	Recap
54	February 7	Carolina	5–4	San Jose		Niemi	17,139	28–19–7	63	Recap
55	February 9	Calgary	4–1	San Jose		Niemi	17,010	28–20–7	63	Recap
56	February 11	Washington	5–4	San Jose	OT	Niemi	16,956	28–20–8	64	Recap
57	February 13	San Jose	4–2	Arizona		Niemi	16,713	29–20–8	66	Recap
58	February 15	Tampa Bay	5–2	San Jose		Niemi	17,562	29–21–8	66	Recap
59	February 17	San Jose	1–5	Nashville		Stalock	16,206	29–22–8	66	Recap
60	February 19	San Jose	5–2	Dallas		Niemi	17,568	30–22–8	68	Recap
61	February 21 (outdoor game)	Los Angeles	2–1	San Jose		Niemi	70,205 (at Levi's Stadium)	30–23–8	68	Recap
62	February 26	Detroit	3–2	San Jose		Niemi	17,562	30–24–8	68	Recap
63	February 28	Ottawa	4–2	San Jose		Niemi	17,562	30–25–8	68	Recap

March: 7–5–1 (home: 3–2–0; road: 4–3–1)
#	Date	Visitor	Score	Home	OT	Decision	Attendance	Record	Pts	Recap
64	March 2	Montreal	0–4	San Jose		Stalock	17,236	31–25–8	70	Recap
65	March 3	San Jose	6–2	Vancouver		Niemi	18,535	32–25–8	72	Recap
66	March 7	Vancouver	3–2	San Jose		Niemi	17,562	32–26–8	72	Recap
67	March 9	Pittsburgh	1–2	San Jose	SO	Niemi	17,336	33–26–8	74	Recap
68	March 12	Nashville	0–2	San Jose		Niemi	17,562	34–26–8	76	Recap
69	March 14	Chicago	6–2	San Jose		Niemi	17,562	34–27–8	76	Recap
70	March 17	San Jose	2–5	Winnipeg		Niemi	15,016	34–28–8	76	Recap
71	March 19	San Jose	4–1	Toronto		Niemi	18,926	35–28–8	78	Recap
72	March 21	San Jose	0–2	Montreal		Niemi	21,286	35–29–8	78	Recap
73	March 23	San Jose	2–5	Ottawa		Niemi	18,193	35–30–8	78	Recap
74	March 26	San Jose	6–4	Detroit		Niemi	20,027	36–30–8	80	Recap
75	March 28	San Jose	3–2	Philadelphia	SO	Stalock	18,783	37–30–8	82	Recap
76	March 29	San Jose	2–3	Pittsburgh	SO	Stalock	18,620	37–30–9	83	Recap

April: 3–3–0 (home: 2–1–0; road: 1–2–0)
#	Date	Visitor	Score	Home	OT	Decision	Attendance	Record	Pts	Recap
77	April 1	Colorado	1–5	San Jose		Stalock	17,562	38–30–9	85	Recap
78	April 3	Arizona	1–3	San Jose		Niemi	17,562	39–30–9	87	Recap
79	April 4	San Jose	3–5	Arizona		Niemi	14,752	39–31–9	87	Recap
80	April 6	Dallas	5–1	San Jose		Stalock	17,562	39–32–9	87	Recap
81	April 9	San Jose	3–1	Edmonton		Niemi	16,839	40–32–9	89	Recap
82	April 11	San Jose	1–4	Los Angeles		Stalock	18,230	40–33–9	89	Recap

Legend: Win (2 points) Loss (0 points) Overtime/shootout loss (1 point)

== Player statistics ==
=== Skaters ===
Final statistics.

Regular season
Player	GP	G	A	Pts	+/−	PIM
Joe Pavelski	82	37	33	70	+12	29
Logan Couture	82	27	40	67	−6	12
Joe Thornton	78	16	49	65	−4	30
Brent Burns	82	17	43	60	−9	65
Patrick Marleau	82	19	38	57	−17	12
Tommy Wingels	75	15	21	36	−7	40
Tomas Hertl	82	13	18	31	−5	16
Matthew Nieto	72	10	17	27	−12	20
Melker Karlsson	53	13	11	24	−3	20
Marc-Edouard Vlasic	70	9	14	23	+12	23
Justin Braun	70	1	22	23	+8	48
Chris Tierney	43	6	15	21	+3	6
Matt Irwin	53	8	11	19	+3	18
James Sheppard^{‡}	57	5	11	16	−3	28
Barclay Goodrow	60	4	8	12	−1	35
Tyler Kennedy^{‡}	25	4	5	9	+1	8
Brenden Dillon^{†}	60	2	7	9	−11	54
Andrew Desjardins^{‡}	56	5	3	8	−2	50
Matt Tennyson	27	2	6	8	0	16
Scott Hannan	58	2	5	7	0	26
Ben Smith	19	2	3	5	+3	0
Tye McGinn^{‡}	33	1	4	5	+1	11
John Scott	38	3	1	4	0	87
Mirco Mueller	39	1	3	4	−8	10
Taylor Fedun	7	0	4	4	0	4
Adam Burish	20	1	2	3	−6	33
Jason Demers^{‡}	20	0	3	3	−6	8
Bryan Lerg	2	1	0	1	−1	0
Daniil Tarasov	5	0	1	1	+2	0
Mike Brown	12	0	0	0	0	22
Micheal Haley	4	0	0	0	−1	11
Eriah Hayes	4	0	0	0	−2	2
Karl Stollery	5	0	0	0	−4	4
Freddie Hamilton^{‡}	1	0	0	0	−1	0

=== Goaltenders ===
Regular season
Player	GP	GS	TOI	W	L	OT	GA	GAA	SA	SV%	SO	G	A	PIM
Antti Niemi	61	61	3587:54	31	23	7	155	2.59	1811	.914	5	0	3	0
Alex Stalock	22	19	1236:30	8	9	2	54	2.62	553	.902	2	0	0	2
Troy Grosenick	2	2	118:22	1	1	0	3	1.53	58	.948	1	0	0	0

^{†}Denotes player spent time with another team before joining the Sharks. Stats reflect time with the Sharks only.
^{‡}Traded mid-season
Bold/italics denotes franchise record

== Notable occurrences ==
=== Milestones ===
Regular season
Player	Milestone	Reached
C. Tierney	1st career NHL game 1st career NHL assist 1st career NHL point	October 8, 2014
M. Muller	1st career NHL game	October 8, 2014
S. Hannan	1,000th career NHL game	October 14, 2014
L. Couture	300th career NHL game	October 14, 2014
M. Muller	1st career NHL assist 1st career NHL point	October 16, 2014
J. Thornton	1,200th career NHL point	October 21, 2014
P. Marleau	500th career NHL assist	October 23, 2014
B. Burns	100th career NHL goal	October 26, 2014
B. Burns	300th career NHL point	October 28, 2014
M. Muller	1st career NHL goal	October 30, 2014
B. Goodrow	1st career NHL game	October 30, 2014
B. Burns	200th career NHL assist	October 30, 2014
T. Grosenick	1st career NHL game 1st career NHL win 1st career NHL shutout	November 16, 2014
B. Goodrow	1st career NHL assist 1st career NHL point	November 16, 2014
J. Demers	300th career NHL game	November 20, 2014
J. Pavelski	200th career NHL goal	November 22, 2014
B. Goodrow	1st career NHL goal	December 9, 2014
M. Karlsson	1st career NHL game 1st career NHL assist 1st career NHL point	December 9, 2014
A. Niemi	300th career NHL game	December 18, 2014
M. Karlsson	1st career NHL goal	December 22, 2014
J. Pavelski	600th career NHL game	January 3, 2015
T. Wingels	200th career NHL game	January 10, 2015
M. Nieto	100th career NHL game	January 13, 2015
P. Marleau	1,300th career NHL game	February 5, 2015
D. Tarasov	1st career NHL game 1st career NHL assist 1st career NHL point	February 5, 2015
C. Tierney	1st career NHL goal	February 5, 2015
T. Hertl	100th career NHL game	February 28, 2015
B. Burns	700th career NHL game	March 9, 2015
J. Thornton	900th career NHL assist	April 6, 2015
B. Lerg	1st career NHL game 1st career NHL goal 1st career NHL point	April 9, 2015

=== Awards ===
Recipient	Award(s)
Brent Burns	All-Star Game participant

=== Suspensions and fines ===
Player	Explanation	Length	Salary	Date issued
John Scott	Leaving the bench to start an altercation with Anaheim Ducks forward Tim Jackman	2 games	$17,073.18	October 27, 2014
John Scott	Punching an unsuspecting Anaheim Ducks forward Tim Jackman	4 games	$34,146.36	December 24, 2014
Logan Couture	Slew-footing Detroit Red Wings defensman Brendan Smith	—	$5,000.00	February 27, 2015

== Transactions ==
The Sharks have been involved in the following transactions during the 2014–15 season:

=== Trades ===
Date	Details
June 27, 2014	To Chicago Blackhawks 1st-round pick in 2014; NYR's 6th-round pick in 2014	To San Jose Sharks 1st-round pick in 2014; FLA's 3rd-round pick in 2014
June 28, 2014	To Nashville Predators 2nd-round pick in 2014; 4th-round pick in 2015	To San Jose Sharks DET's 2nd-round pick in 2014
June 28, 2014	To Nashville Predators FLA's 3rd-round pick in 2014	To San Jose Sharks 3rd-round pick in 2014; 4th-round pick in 2014
July 1, 2014	To Colorado Avalanche Brad Stuart	To San Jose Sharks 2nd-round pick in 2016; 6th-round pick in 2017
July 2, 2014	To Philadelphia Flyers 3rd-round pick in 2015	To San Jose Sharks Tye McGinn
November 21, 2014	To Dallas Stars Jason Demers; 3rd-round pick in 2016	To San Jose Sharks Brenden Dillon
February 9, 2015	To Tampa Bay Lightning Future considerations	To San Jose Sharks Evgeni Nabokov
March 1, 2015	To New York Rangers James Sheppard	To San Jose Sharks 4th-round pick in 2016
March 2, 2015	To Colorado Avalanche Freddie Hamilton	To San Jose Sharks Karl Stollery
March 2, 2015	To Chicago Blackhawks Andrew Desjardins	To San Jose Sharks Ben Smith; Conditional 7th-round pick in 2017
March 2, 2015	To New York Islanders Tyler Kennedy	To San Jose Sharks Conditional 3rd-round pick in 2016

=== Free agents acquired ===
Date	Player	Former team	Contract terms (in U.S. dollars)	Ref
July 1, 2014	John Scott	Buffalo Sabres	1 year, $750,000	
July 1, 2014	Taylor Fedun	Edmonton Oilers	1 year, $600,000	
July 10, 2014	Bryan Lerg	Colorado Avalanche	1 year, $575,000	
July 10, 2014	Micheal Haley	New York Rangers	1 year, $600,000	
March 26, 2015	Joel Rumpel	University of Wisconsin–Madison	1 year, entry-level contract	

=== Free agents lost ===
Date	Player	New team	Contract terms (in U.S. dollars)	Ref
July 1, 2014	Dan Boyle	New York Rangers	2 years, $9 million	
July 1, 2014	Martin Havlat	New Jersey Devils	1 year, $1.5 million	
July 8, 2014	John McCarthy	St. Louis Blues	1 year, $600,000	

=== Claimed via waivers ===
Player	Former team	Date claimed off waivers

=== Lost via waivers ===
Player	New team	Date claimed off waivers
Tye McGinn	Arizona Coyotes	March 2, 2015

=== Players released ===
Date	Player	Via	Ref
June 27, 2014	Martin Havlat	Compliance buyout	

=== Lost via retirement ===
Date	Player	Ref
February 11, 2015	Evgeni Nabokov	

=== Player signings ===
Date	Player	Contract terms (in U.S. dollars)	Ref
June 27, 2014	Travis Oleksuk	1 year, 550,000	
July 8, 2014	Tommy Wingels	3 years, $7.425 million	
July 8, 2014	James Sheppard	1 year, $1.3 million	
July 10, 2014	Scott Hannan	1 year, $1 million	
July 10, 2014	Matt Tennyson	2 years, $1.25 million	
July 16, 2014	Taylor Doherty	1 year, $675,000	
July 16, 2014	Jason Demers	2 years, $6.8 million	
September 17, 2014	Justin Braun	5 years, $19 million contract extension	
September 26, 2014	Julius Bergman	3 years, $2.775 million entry-level contract	
September 26, 2014	Nikolay Goldobin	3 years, $3.4125 million entry-level contract	
December 31, 2014	Rourke Chartier	3 years, entry-level contract	
March 26, 2015	Joakim Ryan	2 years, entry-level contract	

== Draft picks ==
The 2014 NHL entry draft was held on June 27–28, 2014, at the Wells Fargo Center in Philadelphia.

Round	#	Player	Pos	Nationality	College/junior/club team (league)
1	27^{[a]}	Nikolay Goldobin	Left wing	Russia	Sarnia Sting (OHL)
2	46	Julius Bergman	Left wing	Sweden	Frölunda HC U20 (J20 SuperElit)
2	53^{[b]}	Noah Rod	Right wing	Switzerland	Geneve-Servette HC U20 (CH-U20)
3	72	Alex Schoenborn	Right wing	United States	Portland Winterhawks (WHL)
3	81	Dylan Sadowy	Left wing	Canada	Saginaw Spirit (OHL)
4	102	Alexis Vanier	Defence	Canada	Baie-Comeau Drakkar (QMJHL)
5	149^{[c]}	Rourke Chartier	Centre	Canada	Kelowna Rockets (WHL)
6	171	Kevin Labanc	Right wing	United States	Barrie Colts (OHL)

Draft notes

- ^{a} The Chicago Blackhawks' first-round pick went to San Jose Sharks as the result of a trade on June 27, 2014, that sent a first-round pick in 2014 (27th overall) and the Rangers sixth-round pick in 2014 (179th overall) to Chicago in exchange for a first-round pick in 2014 (20th overall) and this pick.
- ^{b} The Pittsburgh Penguins' second-round pick went to the San Jose Sharks as the result of a trade on March 25, 2013, that sent Douglas Murray to the Penguins in exchange for a 2013 second-round pick (#58–Tyler Bertuzzi) and this conditional pick.
  - Condition – Second-round pick if Penguins advance to third round of 2013 playoffs or if Murray re-signs with Penguins for 2013–14 season, else third-round pick. Converted to third-round pick when Penguins were eliminated in second-round of 2013 playoffs and Murray signed with the Montreal Canadiens on August 22, 2013.
- The San Jose Sharks' fourth-round pick went to the Edmonton Oilers as the result of a trade on October 21, 2013, that sent Mike Brown to the Sharks in exchange for this pick.
- ^{c} The New York Rangers' fifth-round pick went to the San Jose Sharks as the result of a trade on April 2, 2013, that sent Ryan Clowe to the Rangers in exchange for a 2013 second-round pick (#49–Gabryel Paquin-Boudreau), a 2013 third-round pick (#62–Yan-Pavel Laplante) and this conditional pick.
  - Condition – Second round if Rangers advance to third round of 2013 playoffs or if Clowe re-signs with Rangers after 2013 season, else fifth round. Converted on July 5, 2013.
- The San Jose Sharks' fifth-round pick went to the Chicago Blackhawks as the result of a trade on June 30, 2013, that sent Anaheim's fourth-round pick in 2013, and a fifth-round pick in 2013 to the Sharks in exchange for a fourth-round pick in 2013 and this pick.
- The San Jose Sharks' seventh-round pick went to the Detroit Red Wings as the result of a trade on June 10, 2012, that sent Brad Stuart to the Sharks in exchange for Andrew Murray, and this conditional pick.
  - Condition – If Stuart re-signs with Sharks. Converted on June 18, 2012.
