= 2014–15 Ottawa Senators season =

Professional ice hockey team season of play

2014–15 Ottawa Senators
- Division: 4th Atlantic
- Conference: 7th Eastern
- 2014–15 record: 43–26–13
- Home record: 23–13–5
- Road record: 20–13–8
- Goals for: 238
- Goals against: 215

Team information
- General manager: Bryan Murray
- Coach: Paul MacLean; Dave Cameron
- Captain: Erik Karlsson
- Alternate captains: Chris Neil; Chris Phillips
- Arena: Canadian Tire Centre
- Average attendance: 18,247
- Minor league affiliates: Binghamton Senators (AHL); Wichita Thunder (ECHL)

Team leaders
- Goals: Mike Hoffman (27)
- Assists: Erik Karlsson (45)
- Points: Erik Karlsson (66)
- Penalty minutes: Mark Borowiecki (105)
- Plus/minus: Marc Methot (+22)
- Wins: Andrew Hammond (20)
- Goals against average: Andrew Hammond (1.86)

The 2014–15 Ottawa Senators season was the 23rd season of the Ottawa Senators of the National Hockey League (NHL). After an eventful regular season, the team returned to the NHL playoffs after not qualifying in the 2013–14 NHL season.

With the team at .500 in early December, general manager Bryan Murray fired head coach Paul MacLean, replacing him with assistant coach Dave Cameron. After being 14 points out of a playoff spot at the start of February, the Senators rallied behind the outstanding play of call-up goaltender Andrew Hammond down the stretch and qualified for the playoffs in the last game of the regular season. For his play, Hammond, nicknamed the "Hamburglar", gained league-wide attention, being named as an NHL Star of the Month and Week. Two rookies had outstanding seasons. Mark Stone who was nominated for the Calder Memorial Trophy, tied for the lead in points among rookies and Mike Hoffman led all rookies in goal scoring. First-year captain Erik Karlsson led the team in scoring with 66 points and won the James Norris Memorial Trophy as the league's top defenceman.

In the playoffs, the Senators played the Montreal Canadiens in the first round of the playoffs. It was a rematch of the 2013 series which the Senators won. The Senators fell behind 3–0 in the series before rallying back with two wins. However, the comeback fell short and the Senators were eliminated in six games. Hammond started the series but was replaced in the third game by the Senators' number one goalie Craig Anderson, who was outstanding in his return to play.

Before the season, it was learned that Murray had cancer, for which he underwent treatment weekly during the season, although he continued in his duties as general manager. In March 2015, it was learned that assistant coach Mark Reeds also had cancer. Reeds died on the eve of the playoffs, and the team dedicated their play to Reeds. Owner Eugene Melnyk was too ill to attend the playoffs and received a liver transplant in May 2015 after a public appeal for donors.

== Off-season ==
On May 11, 2014, it was reported that the Senators were looking to trade captain Jason Spezza, who has one year remaining on his current contract, prior to the 2014 NHL entry draft. Spezza was traded on July 1 to the Dallas Stars, along with Ludwig Karlsson for Alex Chiasson, Alex Guptill, Nick Paul and a 2015 draft second-round pick. Milan Michalek re-signed with the Senators on the same day, for a three-year extension. On July 4, free agent David Legwand signed with the Senators on a two-year deal. On July 7, the team issued a statement that general manager Bryan Murray had been diagnosed with an undisclosed form of cancer and will undergo treatment immediately. Assistant general managers Pierre Dorion and Randy Lee will manage hockey operations when Murray is undergoing treatment.

On August 18, 2014, TSN and the Ottawa Senators announced that the team's regional games will be broadcast on a new channel launching on August 25, 2014. The new channel is called TSN5. The channel will broadcast 53 games in the regular season plus preseason games.

On August 19, 2014, the Ottawa Senators announced that the team had surpassed over $100 million in community contributions in Eastern Ontario and Western Quebec. The total includes over $59 million in community projects, over $25 million in contributions to charities and minor hockey programs, and more than $21 million in community programs and in-kind donations.

On September 9, 2014, the Ottawa Senators announced a couple of affiliation agreements. The club announced they've extended their American Hockey League (AHL) affiliation with the Binghamton Senators through the 2018–19 season. The Senators also announced a new ECHL affiliation with the Evansville IceMen through the 2015-16 season.

After some speculation about right winger Bobby Ryan's status entering the final year of his contract, on October 2, 2014, the team re-signed Ryan to a seven-year $50.25 million contract extension. At the same press conference announcing Ryan's signing, it was announced that Erik Karlsson was named team captain, the ninth in the current Senators history.

== Regular season ==
The team began their season October 9 with a three-game road trip beginning in Nashville taking on the Predators. Their home opener took place one week later on October 16 when they hosted the Colorado Avalanche at the Canadian Tire Centre. The Senators finished the home portion of their schedule on April 7, 2015 against the Pittsburgh Penguins. Their final regular season game took place in Philadelphia when they defeated the Flyers on April 11.

Former long-time Senators captain Daniel Alfredsson signed a one-game contract with Ottawa so he could announce his retirement as a member of the Senators. He was honoured prior to the match on December 4, 2014, where he participated in the pre-game warmup wearing an Ottawa jersey with the captain's insignia, which current captain Erik Karlsson relinquished for the occasion. Alfredsson would in March, receive the "key to the city" of Ottawa from Ottawa Mayor Jim Watson.

Head coach Paul MacLean was fired 27 games into the season. It was 109 games after MacLean won the Jack Adams trophy as NHL Coach of the Year. general manager Bryan Murray elevated assistant coach Dave Cameron to head coach. According to Murray, there was discord among the players. The team was at .500, and Murray expressed the hope that the team had enough games to make run to the playoffs.

In February, both of the Senators' goalies were injured. Craig Anderson injured his hand in practice and Robin Lehner was concussed in a collision with Clarke MacArthur who also received a concussion. Binghamton starting goalie Andrew "Hamburglar" Hammond was elevated to Ottawa. He won his first five starts (his first starts ever in the NHL) and was named NHL First Star for the week of February 23 – March 1. The Senators won three straight games in California, the first time the franchise had done so. The corresponding win streak elevated the Senators into playoff contention for the final wild-card spot. In March, Anderson returned to the lineup and started two games. After losing to Boston, the team the Senators were chasing, coach Cameron returned to starting Hammond, who continued his streak of holding the opposition to two or fewer goals, and the team being undefeated in regulation time with him starting. Hammond became only the third NHL goalie since 1938 to hold the opposition to two or fewer goals for his first twelve career starts. The team continued its run with Hammond and qualified for the playoffs in the final game of the season. The team had been 14 points out of a playoff spot and was the first team in NHL history to overcome that large of a deficit to qualify for the playoffs. They also became the first team not to get shutout in a full regular season since the Buffalo Sabres during the 2006-07 season.

== Playoffs ==
The Senators qualified for the playoffs after missing them in 2014. It is the fifteenth time in the modern franchise's 23-year history they've gone to the post-season. The Senators finished the regular season on a 23-4-4 run in their final 31 games in order to qualify for the postseason.

Prior to the season, several sports outlets predicted the club would miss the playoffs. According to The Hockey News yearbook, the club's Stanley Cup odds were 95-1, and the club would finish in seventh place in the Atlantic Division. The official NHL 2015 Yearbook predicted the Senators would finish in 13th place in the Eastern Conference. Gambling site Bodog set the expected over/under for points at 78.5. That is 14.5 less points than the final playoff spot in the Eastern Conference the prior season.

=== First round: Ottawa vs. Montreal ===
Montreal, which won the Atlantic Division title, had home ice advantage over the Senators, who took the first wild card position. This was a rematch of the 2013 playoff series between the teams won by the Senators. In the 2014–15 regular season series, the Senators won three games of four between the teams.

In game one in Montreal, the Senators started rookie goaltender Andrew Hammond for his first NHL career playoff start. An own goal by Andrei Markov was the only scoring of the first period, giving Ottawa a 1–0 lead after the period. Montreal scored four times in the second period to take a 4–3 lead. Montreal defender P. K. Subban was ejected from the game for a slashing attempt to injure on Mark Stone, who left the game but returned to play though injured. The third period was scoreless and Montreal took a 1–0 series lead. The next day, the Senators announced Stone suffered a microfracture in his wrist due to the slash. In game two, the Senators again took the lead with a goal in the first period by Clarke MacArthur. In the second period, the Canadiens took the lead on goals by Max Pacioretty and Subban. In the third, the Senators forced it to overtime with a power play goal by Patrick Wiercioch. In overtime, Alex Galchenyuk scored to win the game for the Canadiens.

The series moved to Ottawa for game three, and Ottawa switched goaltenders, substituting Craig Anderson for Hammond, and inserted Chris Neil into the lineup. For the third time in the series, the Senators scored first, in the first period, on a goal by MacArthur. The second period was scoreless. In the third period, Dale Weise scored to tie the game and send it to overtime. In the overtime, Weise scored again to put the Canadiens up in the series 3–0. In game four, the game was scoreless until halfway through the third period when Mike Hoffman scored the only goal of the game and the Senators staved off elimination. Anderson stopped 28 Canadiens shots to record his third career playoff shutout. It was the Senators' first playoff shutout of the Canadiens and the first playoff shutout of Montreal by Ottawa since the first Senators shut out the Canadiens in April 1927 en route to a Stanley Cup title.

The Senators faced elimination again in game five in Montreal. Again, Ottawa took the lead in the first, this time with two goals by Bobby Ryan and Patrick Wiercioch. The Senators increased their lead in the second period with a power play goal by Erik Karlsson to lead by 3–0 after two. In the third, Tom Gilbert scored to narrow the gap to 3–1. Erik Condra made a critical takeaway and scored on a breakaway. After some roughing between Anderson and Brandon Prust led to a Senators power play, Mike Hoffman scored in the final minute to make it a 5–1 romp. In the game, Montreal out shot Ottawa 46–25 but was repeatedly stymied by Anderson.

In game six, Montreal scored first for the first time in the series, on a first period fluke goal by Brendan Gallagher and made it stand up to the end, adding an empty net goal with one second left to win the game 2–0 and take the series. It was the first and only time this season that Ottawa was shut out. A second-period goal by Jean-Gabriel Pageau was called off by the referee who ruled he had lost sight of the puck. The Senators outshot the Canadiens 43–19 but were stymied by Canadiens' goaltender Carey Price.

== Standings ==
Atlantic Division
Pos	Team	GP	W	L	OTL	ROW	GF	GA	GD	Pts
1	y – Montreal Canadiens	82	50	22	10	43	221	189	+32	110
2	x – Tampa Bay Lightning	82	50	24	8	47	262	211	+51	108
3	x – Detroit Red Wings	82	43	25	14	39	235	221	+14	100
4	x – Ottawa Senators	82	43	26	13	37	238	215	+23	99
5	Boston Bruins	82	41	27	14	37	213	211	+2	96
6	Florida Panthers	82	38	29	15	30	206	223	−17	91
7	Toronto Maple Leafs	82	30	44	8	25	211	262	−51	68
8	Buffalo Sabres	82	23	51	8	15	161	274	−113	54

Source: National Hockey League
x – Clinched playoff spot; y – Clinched division

Eastern Conference Wild Card
Pos	Div	Team	GP	W	L	OTL	ROW	GF	GA	GD	Pts
1	AT	x – Ottawa Senators	82	43	26	13	37	238	215	+23	99
2	ME	x – Pittsburgh Penguins	82	43	27	12	39	221	210	+11	98
3	AT	Boston Bruins	82	41	27	14	37	213	211	+2	96
4	AT	Florida Panthers	82	38	29	15	30	206	223	−17	91
5	ME	Columbus Blue Jackets	82	42	35	5	33	236	250	−14	89
6	ME	Philadelphia Flyers	82	33	31	18	30	215	234	−19	84
7	ME	New Jersey Devils	82	32	36	14	27	181	216	−35	78
8	ME	Carolina Hurricanes	82	30	41	11	25	188	226	−38	71
9	AT	Toronto Maple Leafs	82	30	44	8	25	211	262	−51	68
10	AT	Buffalo Sabres	82	23	51	8	15	161	274	−113	54

Source: National Hockey League
x – Clinched playoff spot

== Schedule and results ==
=== Pre-season ===
2014 preseason game log: 4–2–1 (Home: 2–0–0; Road: 2–2–1)
#	Date	Visitor	Score	Home	OT	Decision	Attendance	Record	Recap
1^{[a]}^{[b]}	September 22	Ottawa	2–3	NY Islanders		Hammond		0–1–0
2^{[a]}^{[b]}	September 22	Ottawa	2–3	NY Islanders	SO	Lehner		0–1–1
3^{[b]}	September 24	Toronto	2–3	Ottawa		Anderson	15,865	1–1–1
4^{[b]}	September 24	Ottawa	4–3	Toronto	SO	Lehner	17,939	2–1–1
5	September 30	Ottawa	1–2	Winnipeg		Anderson	14,560	2–2–1
6	October 3	Montreal	3–4	Ottawa	OT	Lehner	19,034	3–2–1
7	October 4	Ottawa	4–2	Montreal		Anderson	21,287	4–2–1
Notes: ^{a} Games were played at Mile One Centre in St. John's, Newfoundland.; ^{b} Split-squad games.

=== Regular season ===
2014–15 Game Log

October: 5–2–2 (Home: 2–0–2; Road: 3–2–0)
#	Date	Visitor	Score	Home	OT	Decision	Attendance	Record	Pts	Recap
1	October 9	Ottawa	2–3	Nashville		Anderson	17,113	0–1–0	0
2	October 11	Ottawa	3–2	Tampa Bay	SO	Lehner	19,204	1–1–0	2
3	October 13	Ottawa	1–0	Florida		Anderson	7,311	2–1–0	4
4	October 16	Colorado	3–5	Ottawa		Anderson	19,913	3–1–0	6
5	October 18	Columbus	2–3	Ottawa		Lehner	18,994	4–1–0	8
–	October 22	Toronto		Ottawa	Game rescheduled to November 9 due to shootings in Ottawa.
6	October 25	New Jersey	3–2	Ottawa	OT	Lehner	19,266	4–1–1	9
7	October 26	Ottawa	1–2	Chicago		Anderson	21,310	4–2–1	9
8	October 28	Ottawa	5–2	Columbus		Lehner	14,749	5–2–1	11
9	October 30	Chicago	5–4	Ottawa	SO	Anderson	17,529	5–2–2	12

November: 5–7–2 (Home: 3–2–1; Road: 2–5–1)
#	Date	Visitor	Score	Home	OT	Decision	Attendance	Record	Pts	Recap
10	November 1	Ottawa	2–4	Boston		Lehner	17,565	5–3–2	12
11	November 4	Detroit	1–3	Ottawa		Anderson	16,436	6–3–2	14
12	November 6	Minnesota	0–3	Ottawa		Anderson	16,867	7–3–2	16
13	November 8	Winnipeg	2–1	Ottawa	SO	Anderson	19,189	7–3–3	17
14	November 9	Toronto	5–3	Ottawa		Lehner	19,229	7–4–3	17
15	November 11	Ottawa	3–4	Vancouver	OT	Anderson	18,775	7–4–4	18
16	November 13	Ottawa	4–3	Edmonton	OT	Anderson	16,839	8–4–4	20
17	November 15	Ottawa	2–4	Calgary		Anderson	19,289	8–5–4	20
18	November 20	Nashville	2–3	Ottawa		Lehner	16,796	9–5–4	22
19	November 22	St. Louis	3–2	Ottawa		Lehner	18,479	9–6–4	22
20	November 24	Ottawa	3–4	Detroit		Anderson	20,027	9–7–4	22
21	November 25	Ottawa	3–2	St. Louis	SO	Lehner	16,680	10–7–4	24
22	November 28	Ottawa	2–3	Florida		Anderson	9,758	10–8–4	24
23	November 29	Ottawa	1–4	Tampa Bay		Lehner	19,204	10–9–4	24

December: 5–5–3 (Home: 3–2–1; Road: 2–3–2)
#	Date	Visitor	Score	Home	OT	Decision	Attendance	Record	Pts	Recap
24	December 2	Ottawa	2–3	NY Islanders	OT	Anderson	13,888	10–9–5	25
25	December 4	NY Islanders	2–1	Ottawa		Anderson	20,511	10–10–5	25
26	December 6	Ottawa	2–3	Pittsburgh		Anderson	18,492	10–11–5	25
27	December 7	Vancouver	3–4	Ottawa	OT	Anderson	16,870	11–11–5	27
28	December 11	Los Angeles	5–3	Ottawa		Anderson	17,284	11–12–5	27
29	December 13	Ottawa	3–2	Boston	SO	Lehner	17,565	12–12–5	29
30	December 15	Ottawa	4–5	Buffalo	SO	Lehner	14,578	12–12–6	30
31	December 17	Ottawa	2–0	New Jersey		Anderson	15,379	13–12–6	32
32	December 19	Anaheim	2–6	Ottawa		Anderson	19,443	14–12–6	34
33	December 20	Ottawa	1–4	Montreal		Lehner	21,287	14–13–6	34
34	December 22	Ottawa	1–2	Washington		Anderson	18,506	14–14–6	34
35	December 27	Detroit	3–2	Ottawa	OT	Anderson	17,194	14–14–7	35
36	December 29	Buffalo	2–5	Ottawa		Anderson	18,284	15–14–7	37

January: 5–5–2 (Home: 3–3–0; Road: 2–2–2)
#	Date	Visitor	Score	Home	OT	Decision	Attendance	Record	Pts	Recap
37	January 3	Ottawa	3–2	Boston	OT	Anderson	17,565	16–14–7	39
38	January 4	Tampa Bay	4–2	Ottawa		Lehner	16,949	16–15–7	39
39	January 6	Ottawa	1–2	Philadelphia	SO	Anderson	19,571	16–15–8	40
40	January 8	Ottawa	2–5	Colorado		Anderson	14,697	16–16–8	40
41	January 10	Ottawa	5–1	Arizona		Anderson	14,933	17–16–8	42
42	January 13	Ottawa	4–5	Dallas		Lehner	16,213	17–17–8	42
43	January 15	Montreal	1–4	Ottawa		Anderson	19,893	18–17–8	44
44	January 17	Carolina	3–2	Ottawa		Anderson	17,434	18–18–8	44
45	January 20	Ottawa	2–3	NY Rangers	OT	Anderson	18,006	18–18–9	45
46	January 21	Toronto	3–4	Ottawa		Anderson	18,894	19–18–9	47
47	January 29	Dallas	6–3	Ottawa		Lehner	18,752	19–19–9	47
48	January 31	Arizona	2–7	Ottawa		Lehner	18,489	20–19–9	49

February: 7–4–1 (Home: 3–3–1; Road: 4–1–0)
#	Date	Visitor	Score	Home	OT	Decision	Attendance	Record	Pts	Recap
49	February 3	Ottawa	1–2	New Jersey		Lehner	11,461	20–20–9	49
50	February 5	Washington	2–1	Ottawa		Lehner	16,543	20–21–9	49
51	February 7	Columbus	4–1	Ottawa		Lehner	16,891	20–22–9	49
52	February 10	Ottawa	2–1	Buffalo		Lehner	19,070	21–22–9	51
53	February 12	Pittsburgh	5–4	Ottawa	SO	Lehner	18,826	21–22–10	52
54	February 14	Edmonton	2–7	Ottawa		Lehner	17,160	22–22–10	54
55	February 16	Carolina	6–3	Ottawa		Lehner	16,562	22–23–10	54
56	February 18	Montreal	2–4	Ottawa		Hammond	18,949	23–23–10	56
–	February 20	Ottawa		Buffalo	Rescheduled to December 15 due to effects on Buffalo's schedule from hazardous weather.
57	February 21	Florida	1–4	Ottawa		Hammond	16,938	24–23–10	58
58	February 25	Ottawa	3–0	Anaheim		Hammond	16,673	25–23–10	60
59	February 26	Ottawa	1–0	Los Angeles		Hammond	18,230	26–23–10	62
60	February 28	Ottawa	4–2	San Jose		Hammond	17,562	27–23–10	64

March: 11–3–2 (Home: 6–3–0; Road: 5–0–2)
#	Date	Visitor	Score	Home	OT	Decision	Attendance	Record	Pts	Recap
61	March 3	Ottawa	2–3	Minnesota	SO	Hammond	19,054	27–23–11	65
62	March 4	Ottawa	3–1	Winnipeg		Hammond	15,016	28–23–11	67
63	March 6	Buffalo	2–3	Ottawa		Hammond	18,241	29–23–11	69
64	March 8	Calgary	4–5	Ottawa	SO	Anderson	16,840	30–23–11	71
65	March 10	Boston	3–1	Ottawa		Anderson	18,961	30–24–11	71
66	March 12	Ottawa	5–2	Montreal		Hammond	21,287	31–24–11	73
67	March 13	Ottawa	2–1	NY Islanders		Hammond	16,170	32–24–11	75
68	March 15	Philadelphia	1–2	Ottawa	SO	Hammond	17,730	33–24–11	77
69	March 17	Ottawa	2–1	Carolina	OT	Hammond	13,469	34–24–11	79
70	March 19	Boston	4–6	Ottawa		Hammond	19,270	35–24–11	81
71	March 21	Toronto	3–5	Ottawa		Hammond	19,194	36–24–11	83
72	March 23	San Jose	2–5	Ottawa		Hammond	18,193	37–24–11	85
73	March 26	NY Rangers	5–1	Ottawa		Hammond	17,753	37–25–11	85
74	March 28	Ottawa	3–4	Toronto	OT	Anderson	18,906	37–25–12	86
75	March 29	Florida	4–2	Ottawa		Anderson	19,045	37–26–12	86
76	March 31	Ottawa	2–1	Detroit	SO	Hammond	20,027	38–26–12	88

April: 5–0–1 (Home: 3–0–0; Road: 2–0–1)
#	Date	Visitor	Score	Home	OT	Decision	Attendance	Record	Pts	Recap
77	April 2	Tampa Bay	1–2	Ottawa	OT	Hammond	18,097	39–26–12	90
78	April 4	Washington	3–4	Ottawa	OT	Hammond	19,961	40–26–12	92
79	April 5	Ottawa	2–3	Toronto	SO	Hammond	18,919	40–26–13	93
80	April 7	Pittsburgh	3–4	Ottawa	OT	Hammond	20,263	41–26–13	95
81	April 9	Ottawa	3–0	NY Rangers		Hammond	18,006	42–26–13	97
82	April 11	Ottawa	3–1	Philadelphia		Hammond	17,027	43–26–13	99

Legend: Win (2 points) Loss (0 points) Overtime/shootout loss (1 point)

=== Playoffs ===
2015 Stanley Cup playoffs

Eastern Conference First Round vs. (A1) Montreal Canadiens: Montreal wins series 4–2
#	Date	Visitor	Score	Home	OT	Decision	Attendance	Series	Recap
1	April 15	Ottawa	3–4	Montreal		Hammond	21,287	0–1	Recap
2	April 17	Ottawa	2–3	Montreal	OT	Hammond	21,287	0–2	Recap
3	April 19	Montreal	2–1	Ottawa	OT	Anderson	20,500	0–3	Recap
4	April 22	Montreal	0–1	Ottawa		Anderson	20,500	1–3	Recap
5	April 24	Ottawa	5–1	Montreal		Anderson	21,287	2–3	Recap
6	April 26	Montreal	2–0	Ottawa		Anderson	20,500	2–4	Recap

Legend: Win Loss

== Player statistics ==
Final Stats

Scoring

Regular season
Player	GP	G	A	Pts	+/−	PIM
Erik Karlsson	82	21	45	66	7	42
Mark Stone	80	26	38	64	21	14
Kyle Turris	82	24	40	64	5	36
Bobby Ryan	78	18	36	54	5	24
Mike Hoffman	79	27	21	48	16	14
Mika Zibanejad	80	20	26	46	0	20
Clarke MacArthur	62	16	20	36	−6	36
Milan Michalek	66	13	21	34	3	33
David Legwand	80	9	18	27	1	32
Alex Chiasson	76	11	15	26	−5	67
Erik Condra	68	9	14	23	13	30
Cody Ceci	81	5	16	21	−4	6
Jean-Gabriel Pageau	50	10	9	19	4	9
Curtis Lazar	67	6	9	15	1	14
Patrick Wiercioch	56	3	10	13	3	28
Eric Gryba	75	0	12	12	11	97
Marc Methot	45	1	10	11	22	18
Mark Borowiecki	63	1	10	11	15	107
Jared Cowen	54	3	6	9	−11	45
Chris Neil	38	4	3	7	5	78
Zack Smith	37	2	1	3	−8	18
Matt Puempel	13	2	1	3	6	8
Chris Phillips	36	0	3	3	0	12
Colin Greening	26	1	0	1	−5	29
Shane Prince	2	0	1	1	1	0

Playoffs
Player	GP	G	A	Pts	+/−	PIM
Patrick Wiercioch	6	2	2	4	0	4
Erik Karlsson	6	1	3	4	−2	2
Mika Zibanejad	6	1	3	4	0	0
Mark Stone	6	0	4	4	0	2
Mike Hoffman	6	1	2	3	−3	2
Bobby Ryan	6	2	0	2	1	0
Clarke MacArthur	6	2	0	2	−2	18
Kyle Turris	6	1	1	2	−2	18
Cody Ceci	6	0	2	2	0	0
Erik Condra	6	1	0	1	1	0
Milan Michalek	6	1	0	1	−2	4
Jean-Gabriel Pageau	6	0	0	0	0	0
Curtis Lazar	6	0	0	0	0	2
Chris Neil	2	0	0	0	−1	0
Zack Smith	3	0	0	0	−1	0
Marc Methot	6	0	0	0	−1	6
Mark Borowiecki	6	0	0	0	−1	6
Eric Gryba	6	0	0	0	−2	14
Alex Chiasson	4	0	0	0	−3	0
David Legwand	3	0	0	0	−3	0

Goaltenders

Regular season
Player	GP	GS	TOI	W	L	OT	GA	GAA	SA	SV%	SO	G	A	PIM
Andrew Hammond	24	23	1411	20	1	2	42	1.79	707	.941	3	0	1	0
Craig Anderson	35	35	2093	14	13	8	87	2.49	1134	.923	3	0	0	4
Robin Lehner	25	24	1471	9	12	3	74	3.02	779	.905	0	0	1	0
Chris Driedger	1	0	23	0	0	0	0	0.00	10	1.000	0	0	0	0

Playoffs
Player	GP	GS	TOI	W	L	GA	GAA	SA	SV%	SO	G	A	PIM
Craig Anderson	4	4	247	2	2	4	0.97	142	.972	1	0	0	0
Andrew Hammond	2	2	122	0	2	7	3.44	81	.914	0	0	0	0

^{†}Denotes player spent time with another team before joining the Senators. Stats reflect time with the Senators only.
^{‡}No longer with team.
Bold/italics denotes team leader in that category.

== Awards and honours ==
=== Awards ===
Regular season
Player	Award	Awarded
Craig Anderson	NHL Second Star of the Week	November 10, 2014
Bobby Ryan	NHL All-Star game selection	January 10, 2015
Mike Hoffman	NHL All-Star game rookie selection	January 10, 2015
Erik Karlsson	NHL Second Star of the Week	January 26, 2015
Andrew Hammond	NHL First Star of the Week	March 2, 2015
Andrew Hammond	NHL Third Star of the Week	March 16, 2015
Kyle Turris	NHL Second Star of the Week	March 23, 2015
Andrew Hammond	NHL First Star of the Month	April 1, 2015
Andrew Hammond	NHL First Star of the Week	April 6, 2015
Mark Stone	NHL Third Star of the Week	April 13, 2015

==== NHL awards ====
Trophy	Player	Status
Bill Masterton Memorial Trophy	Andrew Hammond	Finalist
Calder Memorial Trophy	Mark Stone	Finalist
James Norris Memorial Trophy	Erik Karlsson	Winner

=== Milestones ===
Player	Milestone	Achievement Date
Curtis Lazar	1st NHL game	October 9, 2014
Alex Chiasson	1st game as a Senator	October 9, 2014
David Legwand	1st game as a Senator	October 9, 2014
Alex Chiasson	1st goal as a Senator; 1st point as a Senator	October 9, 2014
Mark Borowiecki	1st NHL assist	October 9, 2014
Alex Chiasson	1st assist as a Senator	October 11, 2014
Curtis Lazar	1st NHL assist 1st NHL point	October 16, 2014
David Legwand	1st goal as a Senator; 1st point as a Senator	October 16, 2014
Eric Gryba	100th NHL PIM	October 16, 2014
Mike Hoffman	1st NHL game-winning goal	October 18, 2014
Bobby Ryan	300th NHL PIM	October 18, 2014
Zack Smith	400th NHL PIM	October 18, 2014
Curtis Lazar	1st NHL PIM	October 25, 2014
Eric Gryba	100th NHL game	November 1, 2014
Patrick Wiercioch	1st NHL game-winning goal	November 4, 2014
Kyle Turris	100th NHL assist	November 11, 2014
Mark Borowiecki	100th NHL PIM	November 14, 2014
Mike Hoffman	1st NHL overtime-winning goal	November 14, 2014
Milan Michalek	400th NHL point	November 15, 2014
Alex Chiasson	100th NHL game	November 15, 2014
Zack Smith	300th NHL game	November 20, 2014
Clarke MacArthur	500th NHL game	November 20, 2014
David Legwand	1000th NHL game	November 29, 2014
Mika Zibanejad	1st career multi-goal game 1st career 4-point game	December 7, 2014
Curtis Lazar	1st NHL goal	December 15, 2014
Bobby Ryan	1st Hat-Trick as a Senator	December 29, 2014
Marc Methot	400th NHL game	January 8, 2015
Craig Anderson	400th NHL game	January 17, 2015
Marc Methot	1st career 3-point game 1st career 3-assist game	January 31, 2015
Jared Cowen	200th NHL game	February 3, 2015
Cody Ceci	100th NHL game	February 7, 2015
Erik Karlsson	200th NHL assist	February 14, 2015
Shane Prince	1st NHL game 1st NHL assist 1st NHL point	February 16, 2015
Andrew Hammond	1st NHL start 1st NHL win	February 18, 2015
Bobby Ryan	500th NHL game	February 18, 2015
Matt Puempel	1st NHL game	February 21, 2015
Kyle Turris	200th NHL point	February 21, 2015
Andrew Hammond	1st NHL shutout	February 25, 2015
David Legwand	600th NHL point	March 8, 2015
Matt Puempel	1st NHL goal 1st NHL point	March 10, 2015
Milan Michalek	200th NHL goal	March 19, 2015
Andrew Hammond	1st NHL assist 1st NHL point	March 21, 2015
Bobby Ryan	200th NHL assist	March 23, 2015
Chris Driedger	1st NHL game	March 26, 2015
Erik Karlsson	300th NHL point	April 4, 2015
Mark Stone	100th NHL game	April 5, 2015
Mika Zibanejad	100th NHL point	April 7, 2015
Mika Zibanejad	200th NHL game	April 11, 2015
Andrew Hammond	1st NHL playoff game 1st NHL playoff start	April 15, 2015
Mark Borowiecki	1st NHL playoff game	April 15, 2015
Cody Ceci	1st NHL playoff game	April 15, 2015
Mike Hoffman	1st NHL playoff game	April 15, 2015
Curtis Lazar	1st NHL playoff game	April 15, 2015
Patrick Wiercioch	1st NHL playoff assist 1st NHL playoff point	April 15, 2015
Cody Ceci	1st NHL playoff assist 1st NHL playoff point	April 17, 2015
Patrick Wiercioch	1st NHL playoff goal	April 17, 2015
Mike Hoffman	1st NHL playoff goal 1st NHL playoff point	April 22, 2015
Coach	Milestone	Achievement Date
Dave Cameron	1st game as an NHL head coach	December 11, 2014
Dave Cameron	1st win as an NHL head coach	December 13, 2014
Dave Cameron	1st playoff game as an NHL head coach	April 15, 2015
Dave Cameron	1st playoff win as an NHL head coach	April 22, 2015
Team	Milestone	Achievement Date
Ottawa Senators	700th regulation loss	October 9, 2014
Ottawa Senators	5000th goal against	January 17, 2015

=== Records ===
Player	Record	Achievement Date
Chris Phillips	1,179th career games played for the Ottawa Senators	February 5, 2015
Mark Stone	Nine consecutive games of at least one point (Franchise rookie record)	April 11, 2015

== Transactions ==
=== Trades ===
Date	Details
June 28, 2014	To Winnipeg Jets 6th-round pick in 2015	To Ottawa Senators 7th-round pick in 2014
July 1, 2014	To Dallas Stars Jason Spezza; Ludwig Karlsson	To Ottawa Senators Alex Chiasson; Alex Guptill; Nick Paul; 2nd-round pick in 2015

=== Free agents acquired ===
Date	Player	Former team	Contract terms (in U.S. dollars)	Ref
July 2, 2014	Carter Camper	Columbus Blue Jackets	1 year, two-way, $600,000	
July 3, 2014	Aaron Johnson	New York Rangers	1 year, two-way, $800,000	
July 4, 2014	David Legwand	Detroit Red Wings	2 years, $6 million	
January 27, 2015	Brad Mills	Binghamton Senators	1 year	
May 9, 2015	Matt O'Connor	Boston University	2 years, $925,000	

=== Free agents lost ===
Date	Player	New team	Contract terms (in U.S. dollars)	Ref
July 1, 2014	Ales Hemsky	Dallas Stars	3 years, $12 million	
July 12, 2014	Stephane Da Costa	CSKA Moscow (KHL)	1 year	

=== Claimed via waivers ===
Player	Former team	Date claimed off waivers

=== Lost via waivers ===
Player	New team	Date claimed off waivers

=== Player signings ===
Date	Player	Contract terms (in U.S. dollars)	Ref
June 19, 2014	Mike Hoffman	1 year, two-way, $750,000	
July 1, 2014	Milan Michalek	3 years, $12 million	
July 2, 2014	Chris Wideman	1 year, two-way, $700,000	
July 2, 2014	Michael Sdao	2 years, two-way, $1,282,500	
July 2, 2014	Cole Schneider	1 year, two-way, $750,000	
July 3, 2014	David Dziurzynski	2 years, two-way, $750,000	
July 4, 2014	Eric Gryba	2 years, $2.5 million	
July 8, 2014	Alex Grant	1 year, two-way, $700,000	
July 10, 2014	Derek Grant	1 year, two-way, $700,000	
July 31, 2014	Robin Lehner	3 years, $6.675 million	
August 6, 2014	Vincent Dunn	3 years, entry-level contract	
August 18, 2014	Mark Borowiecki	3 years, $3.3 million contract extension	
August 19, 2014	Clarke MacArthur	5 years, $23.25 million contract extension	
August 25, 2014	Craig Anderson	3 years, $12.6 million contract extension	
October 2, 2014	Bobby Ryan	7 years, $50.75 million contract extension	
November 6, 2014	Ben Harpur	3-year entry-level contract	
December 20, 2014	Nick Paul	3-year entry-level contract	
January 27, 2015	Brad Mills	1-year two-way contract	
February 16, 2015	Marc Methot	4 years, $19.6 million contract extension	
May 9, 2015	Matt O'Connor	2-year entry-level contract	
May 20, 2015	Andrew Hammond	3-year, $4.05 million contract extension	
June 11, 2015	Fredrik Claesson	1-year two-way contract	
June 16, 2015	Tobias Lindberg	3-year entry-level contract	
June 18, 2015	Jean-Gabriel Pageau	2 years, $1.8 million contract extension	
June 25, 2015	Mika Zibanejad	2 years, $5.25 million contract extension	
June 25, 2015	Mark Stone	3 years, $10.5 million contract extension	

=== Suspensions/fines ===
Player	Reason	Length	Salary	Date issued
Jared Cowen	Interference against Florida Panthers forward Jussi Jokinen during NHL game no. 877 in Ottawa on February 21, 2015, at 4:38 of the second period	3 games	$113,414.64	February 23, 2015

== Draft picks ==
The 2014 NHL entry draft took place on June 27–28, 2014 at the Wells Fargo Center in Philadelphia, Pennsylvania.

Round	Overall	Player	Position	Nationality	Club team
2	40	Andreas Englund	Defence	Sweden	Djurgårdens IF Hockey (J20 SuperElit)
3	70	Miles Gendron	Defence	United States	Rivers School Red Wings (NEPSAC)
4	100	Shane Eiserman	Left wing	United States	Dubuque Fighting Saints (USHL)
7	189 (from Winnipeg)	Kelly Summers	Defence	Canada	Carleton Place Canadians (CCHL)
7	190	Francis Perron	Left wing	Canada	Rouyn-Noranda Huskies (QMJHL)

Draft notes

- Ottawa's first-round pick went to the Anaheim Ducks, as the result of trade on July 5, 2013 that sent Bobby Ryan to Ottawa, in exchange for Jakob Silfverberg, Stefan Noesen and this pick.
- Ottawa's fifth-round pick went to the Edmonton Oilers, as the result of a trade on March 5, 2014 that sent Ales Hemsky to Ottawa, in exchange for a third-round pick in 2015, and this pick.
- Ottawa's sixth-round pick went to the Minnesota Wild, as the result of a trade on March 12, 2013 that sent Matt Kassian to Ottawa, in exchange for this pick.
- Ottawa traded for the Winnipeg Jets' seventh-round pick, trading a sixth-round pick in the 2015 draft.
