= Peter Holland (ice hockey) =

Canadian ice hockey player (born 1991)

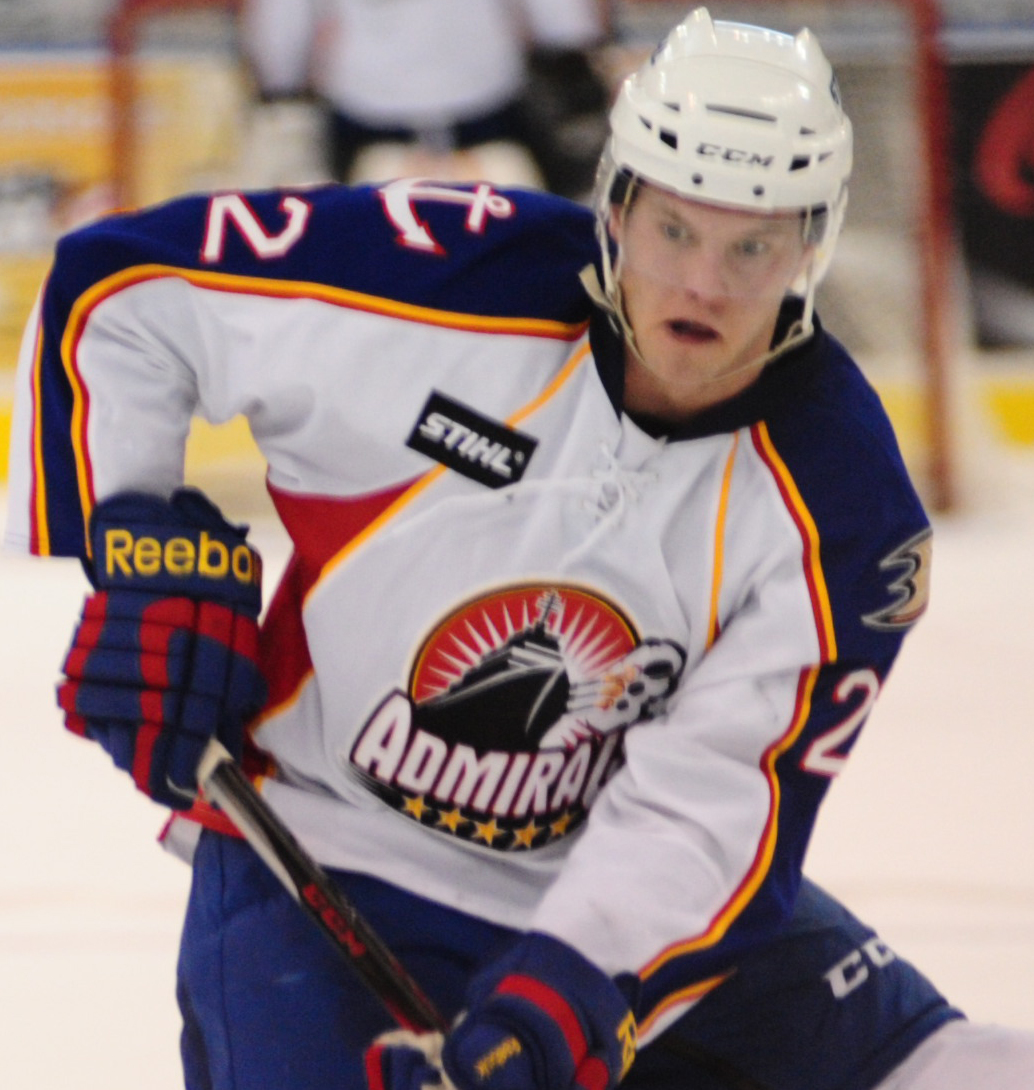
- Holland with the Norfolk Admirals in 2013
- Born: January 14, 1991 (age 35) Caledon, Ontario, Canada
- Height: 6 ft 2 in (188 cm)
- Weight: 200 lb (91 kg; 14 st 4 lb)
- Position: Centre
- Shot: Left
- team Former teams: Free agent Anaheim Ducks; Toronto Maple Leafs; Arizona Coyotes; New York Rangers; Avtomobilist Yekaterinburg; Djurgårdens IF
- NHL draft: 15th overall, 2009; Anaheim Ducks
- Playing career: 2011–2022: 2023–2024

Peter Holland (born January 14, 1991) is a Canadian former professional ice hockey centreman who played in 266 games in the National Hockey League, most notably for the Toronto Maple Leafs. Holland was selected by the Anaheim Ducks in the first round, 15th overall, of the 2009 NHL entry draft and made his NHL debut for the team during the 2011–12 season. Holland also played for the Arizona Coyotes and New York Rangers. After initially retiring in 2022, Holland made a one year comeback with the Colorado Eagles of the American Hockey League. Holland has also made several media appearances during his late career and post retirement, most notably with TSN.

== Playing career ==
=== Amateur ===
Holland grew up in Bolton, Ontario. As a youth, he played and won the 2004 Quebec International Pee-Wee Hockey Tournament with the Brampton Junior Battalion minor ice hockey team under Andy Bathgate and the foregoing's son, Bill. After a successful minor midget season, where Holland had 119 points (59 goals and 60 assists in 60 games), he was selected in the first round, 11th overall, by the Ontario Hockey League (OHL)'s Guelph Storm in the 2007 OHL Priority Draft. His 2008–09 season caught the attention of scouts, as he earned a spot in the OHL All-Star Game, played in the Canada-Russia Challenge and participated in the 2009 CHL Top Prospects Game. He also represented Team Canada at the 2009 IIHF World U18 Championships. Heading into the 2009 NHL entry draft, Holland was ranked 19th by the NHL Central Scouting Bureau. The Anaheim Ducks selected Holland in the first round, 15th overall.

=== Professional ===
On November 5, 2011, Holland made his NHL debut. After scoring 11 points in 12 games to start the 2011–12 season with the Syracuse Crunch, the Anaheim Ducks' American Hockey League (AHL) affiliate, Anaheim recalled Holland to play in a 5–0 road game loss against the Detroit Red Wings. He scored his first NHL goal (the game's winner) on November 11, 2011, against Roberto Luongo of the Vancouver Canucks.

On November 16, 2013, Holland was traded by the Ducks (along with Brad Staubitz) to the Toronto Maple Leafs in exchange for Jesse Blacker and two picks in the 2014 NHL entry draft. He scored his first goal as a Maple Leaf on November 21, 2013, against Marek Mazanec of the Nashville Predators. Holland wore number 24 for the Toronto Maple Leafs.

On July 16, 2014, Holland agreed to a two-year contract extension with Toronto worth an annual average value of $775,000.

After the 2015–16 season, he re-signed with Toronto on a one-year, $1.3 million contract. As the season began Holland was overshadowed by a plethora of young forward rookies including Auston Matthews, Mitch Marner and Connor Brown, among others. Due to limited roster space, Holland seldom played for the Maple Leafs, being scratched in 17 of the team's first 25 games, and seeing limited ice time in the eight games he did play. After being informed by general manager Lou Lamoriello that the team would do their best to trade him, Holland was traded to the Arizona Coyotes in exchange for a conditional draft pick in 2018 on December 9, 2016; the condition was not satisfied.

On July 1, 2017, as a free agent, Holland signed a two-year contract with the Montreal Canadiens, playing the second year on a one-way basis. Ahead of the 2017–18 season, Holland was unable to make the Canadiens' roster out of training camp and was assigned to Montreal's AHL affiliate, the Laval Rocket. With 18 points in 20 games with Laval, on November 30, 2017, Holland was traded to the New York Rangers in exchange for Adam Cracknell.

To start the 2018–19 season, Holland played with New York's AHL affiliate, the Hartford Wolf Pack. On February 18, 2019, Holland was traded to the Chicago Blackhawks in exchange for Darren Raddysh. Assigned to the Rockford IceHogs, Holland continued his scoring pace in notching 7 goals and 16 points in 21 games to conclude the season.

An impending unrestricted free agent from the Blackhawks, Holland opted to pursue a career abroad, agreeing to a two-year contract from Russian club Avtomobilist Yekaterinburg of the Kontinental Hockey League (KHL) on May 22, 2019.

Holland signed a one-year contract with Swedish club Djurgårdens IF of the top-tier Swedish Hockey League (SHL) in September 2021. Holland played 15 games total with Djurgårdens and recorded six assists.

In an October 2021 game versus Luleå HF, Holland got into a fight and ripped an opponent's helmet off, took his own gloves off, and repeatedly punched the Luleå player in the face with his bare fists. Holland was suspended for four games and given a fine of 40,000SEK ($4,000 USD) by the Swedish Ice Hockey Association's disciplinary board. Holland's excuse was that he had never before played in a league where fighting resulted in anything other than a 5-minute penalty. He also claimed he never intended to harm an opponent. The Luleå player, Fredrik Styrman, received a concussion; 10 months after the attack he had to end his hockey career due to of lingering symptoms.

On March 16, 2022, Holland announced through Twitter that he had retired from professional hockey. However, in an attempt to return to play, Holland signed a professional tryout (PTO) with the Colorado Avalanche in August 2023. After attending both training camp and preseason, Holland accepted a reassignment to the Avalanche's AHL affiliate the Colorado Eagles, and was later signed to a one-year AHL contract to begin the 2023–24 season on October 11, 2023.

== Post-playing-career ==
After initially retiring in 2022, Holland attempted to enter the business world through trading crypto currency. Holland noted that playing for his childhood team, the Toronto Maple Leafs, was the pinnacle of his career and that he began to lose interest in hockey once he was traded away from the club, leading to his eventual retirement at 31 years old. International travel restrictions during the COVID-19 pandemic also contributed to his retirement, as family could not visit him while playing overseas.

After his one-season comeback with the Colorado Eagles, Holland quietly retired again to become a real estate agent with his wife under the brand "Holland Homes" in 2024.

During his late career and retirement, Holland has occasionally appeared as a media personality and analyst typically covering the Toronto Maple Leafs, notably on TSN platforms. He also appears at Maple Leafs alumni events.

== Personal life ==
In 2021, Holland graduated summa cum laude from Southern New Hampshire University (SNHU) with a degree in business administration.

Holland and his wife Sasha welcomed their first child during the COVID-19 pandemic.

== Career statistics ==
=== Regular season and playoffs ===
			Regular season					Playoffs
Season	Team	League	GP	G	A	Pts	PIM	GP	G	A	Pts	PIM
2007–08	Guelph Storm	OHL	62	8	15	23	31	10	0	1	1	4
2008–09	Guelph Storm	OHL	68	28	39	67	42	4	4	0	4	2
2009–10	Guelph Storm	OHL	59	30	49	79	40	5	3	5	8	12
2010–11	Guelph Storm	OHL	67	37	51	88	57	6	3	6	9	4
2010–11	Syracuse Crunch	AHL	3	3	3	6	0	—	—	—	—	—
2011–12	Syracuse Crunch	AHL	71	23	37	60	59	—	—	—	—	—
2011–12	Anaheim Ducks	NHL	4	1	0	1	2	—	—	—	—	—
2012–13	Norfolk Admirals	AHL	45	19	20	39	68	—	—	—	—	—
2012–13	Anaheim Ducks	NHL	21	3	2	5	4	—	—	—	—	—
2013–14	Norfolk Admirals	AHL	10	5	4	9	22	—	—	—	—	—
2013–14	Anaheim Ducks	NHL	4	1	0	1	2	—	—	—	—	—
2013–14	Toronto Maple Leafs	NHL	39	5	5	10	16	—	—	—	—	—
2013–14	Toronto Marlies	AHL	14	5	5	10	10	11	7	8	15	6
2014–15	Toronto Maple Leafs	NHL	62	11	14	25	31	—	—	—	—	—
2015–16	Toronto Maple Leafs	NHL	65	9	18	27	28	—	—	—	—	—
2016–17	Toronto Maple Leafs	NHL	8	0	1	1	4	—	—	—	—	—
2016–17	Arizona Coyotes	NHL	40	5	6	11	18	—	—	—	—	—
2017–18	Laval Rocket	AHL	20	8	11	19	19	—	—	—	—	—
2017–18	Hartford Wolf Pack	AHL	16	5	9	14	21	—	—	—	—	—
2017–18	New York Rangers	NHL	23	1	3	4	7	—	—	—	—	—
2018–19	Hartford Wolf Pack	AHL	52	20	29	49	50	—	—	—	—	—
2018–19	Rockford IceHogs	AHL	21	7	9	16	8	—	—	—	—	—
2019–20	Avtomobilist Yekaterinburg	KHL	60	17	26	43	10	5	2	1	3	18
2020–21	Avtomobilist Yekaterinburg	KHL	59	12	24	36	28	5	0	1	1	4
2021–22	Djurgårdens IF	SHL	15	0	6	6	31	—	—	—	—	—
2023–24	Colorado Eagles	AHL	42	14	9	23	52	3	0	2	2	0
NHL totals			266	36	49	85	112	—	—	—	—	—
KHL totals			119	29	50	79	38	10	2	2	4	22

=== International ===
Year	Team	Event	Result	GP	G	A	Pts	PIM
2008	Canada Ontario	U17	1st place, gold medalist(s)	6	4	2	6	0
2009	Canada	U18	4th	6	1	4	5	8
Junior totals				12	5	6	11	8

Awards and achievements
Preceded by Jake Gardiner	Anaheim Ducks first-round draft pick 2009	Succeeded by Kyle Palmieri
