= Colby Robak =

Canadian ice hockey player

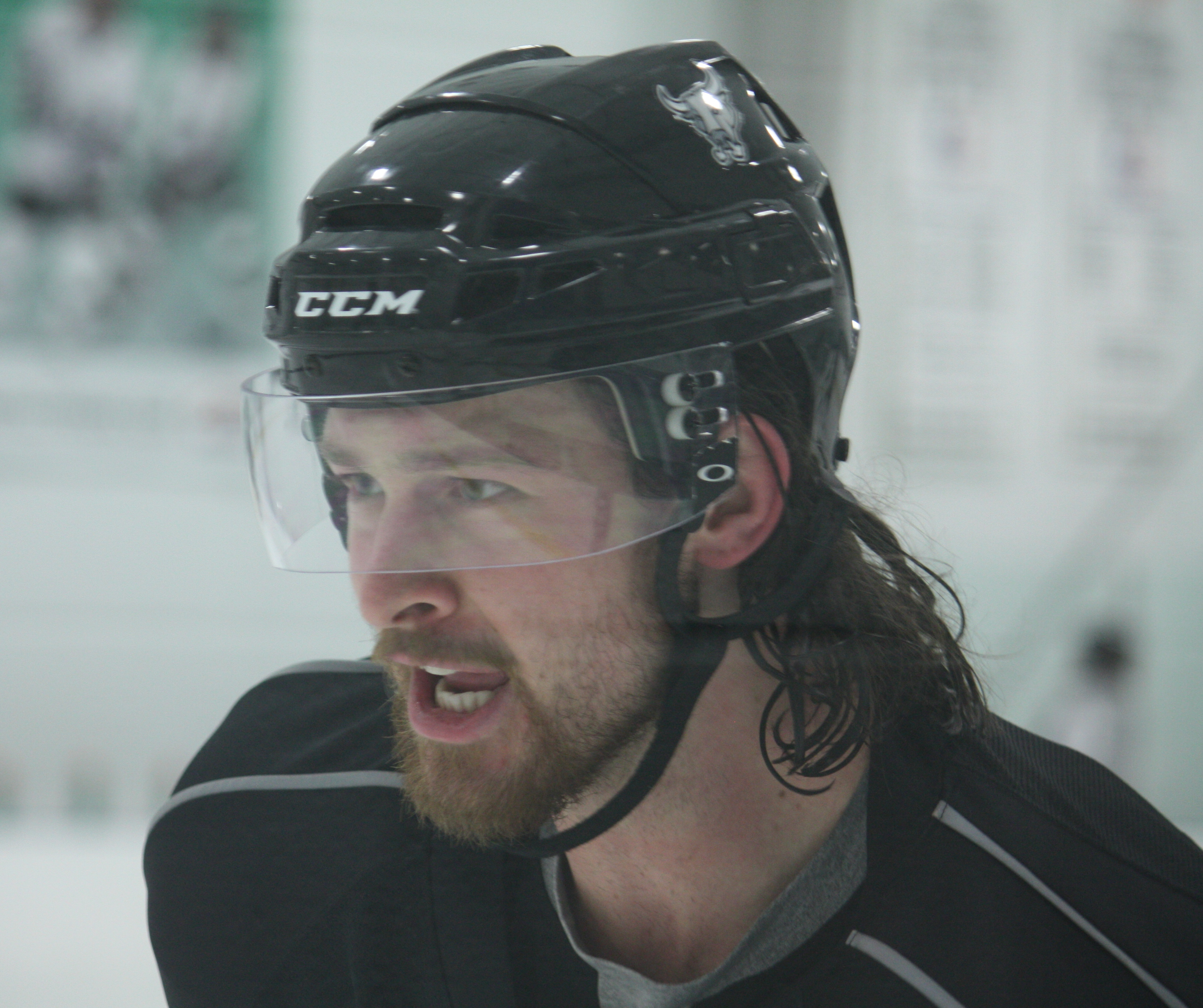
- Born: April 24, 1990 (age 36) Gilbert Plains, Manitoba, Canada
- Height: 6 ft 3 in (191 cm)
- Weight: 207 lb (94 kg; 14 st 11 lb)
- Position: Defense
- Shot: Left
- Played for: Florida Panthers; Anaheim Ducks; Vaasan Sport; Schwenninger Wild Wings
- NHL draft: 46th overall, 2008; Florida Panthers
- Playing career: 2010–2022

Colby Nicky Robak (born April 24, 1990) is a Canadian former professional ice hockey defenceman. He played in the National Hockey League (NHL) with the Florida Panthers and Anaheim Ducks.

== Playing career ==
Robak played major junior hockey with the Brandon Wheat Kings of the Western Hockey League (WHL). He was selected by the Florida Panthers in the 2nd round (46th overall) of the 2008 NHL entry draft.

During the 2014–15 season, Robak was traded by the Panthers to the Anaheim Ducks in exchange for Jesse Blacker and a conditional draft pick on December 4, 2014.

Robak was not tendered a new contract by the Ducks and after going unsigned in the off-season, belatedly agreed to a one-year AHL contract with the Rochester Americans on September 28, 2015. In the 2015–16 season, Robak was a fixture on the blueline for the Americans, adding 5 goals and 20 points in 73 games.

For a second successive off-season, Robak was an un-signed free agent until he agreed to a professional try-out deal with the Stockton Heat of the AHL, affiliate to the Calgary Flames, to begin the 2016–17 season on October 14, 2016. Robak enjoyed early success with the Heat, compiling 5 assists in just 6 games and leading the AHL in Plus–minus before he left the club, to sign a guaranteed one-year deal with fellow AHL club the Utica Comets, affiliate to the Vancouver Canucks, on November 2, 2016.

On October 5, 2018, Robak signed a one-year deal with Vaasan Sport of the Finnish Liiga. This marked the first time he has played outside of North America. After a solitary season in Finland, Robak continued his European career, agreeing to a multi-year contract with German club, Schwenninger Wild Wings of the DEL on November 19, 2019.

== Career statistics ==
=== Regular season and playoffs ===
			Regular season					Playoffs
Season	Team	League	GP	G	A	Pts	PIM	GP	G	A	Pts	PIM
2006–07	Brandon Wheat Kings	WHL	39	2	3	5	12	1	0	0	0	0
2007–08	Brandon Wheat Kings	WHL	71	6	24	30	25	6	0	2	2	8
2008–09	Brandon Wheat Kings	WHL	65	13	29	42	41	12	6	8	14	4
2009–10	Brandon Wheat Kings	WHL	71	16	50	66	9	15	3	9	12	2
2010–11	Rochester Americans	AHL	76	7	17	24	22	—	—	—	—	—
2011–12	San Antonio Rampage	AHL	73	9	30	39	30	8	1	4	5	4
2011–12	Florida Panthers	NHL	3	0	0	0	0	—	—	—	—	—
2012–13	San Antonio Rampage	AHL	63	5	18	23	50	—	—	—	—	—
2012–13	Florida Panthers	NHL	16	0	1	1	17	—	—	—	—	—
2013–14	San Antonio Rampage	AHL	56	8	13	21	24	—	—	—	—	—
2013–14	Florida Panthers	NHL	16	0	2	2	6	—	—	—	—	—
2014–15	Florida Panthers	NHL	7	0	0	0	2	—	—	—	—	—
2014–15	Anaheim Ducks	NHL	5	0	1	1	0	—	—	—	—	—
2014–15	Norfolk Admirals	AHL	29	1	5	6	18	—	—	—	—	—
2015–16	Rochester Americans	AHL	73	5	15	20	50	—	—	—	—	—
2016–17	Stockton Heat	AHL	6	0	5	5	6	—	—	—	—	—
2016–17	Utica Comets	AHL	64	3	25	28	54	—	—	—	—	—
2017–18	Stockton Heat	AHL	45	3	9	12	18	—	—	—	—	—
2018–19	Vaasan Sport	Liiga	29	0	9	9	41	—	—	—	—	—
2019–20	Schwenninger Wild Wings	DEL	34	5	5	10	20	—	—	—	—	—
2020–21	Schwenninger Wild Wings	DEL	38	6	27	33	43	—	—	—	—	—
2021–22	Schwenninger Wild Wings	DEL	55	3	11	14	28	—	—	—	—	—
NHL totals			47	0	4	4	25	—	—	—	—	—

=== International ===
Year	Team	Event	Result	GP	G	A	Pts	PIM
2008	Canada	U18	1st place, gold medalist(s)	7	0	1	1	8
Junior totals				7	0	1	1	8

== Awards and honours ==
Award	Year
WHL
Plus-Mius Award	2009–10
East Second All-Star Team	2009–10
