= Jesse Blacker =

Canadian-Kazakh ice hockey player

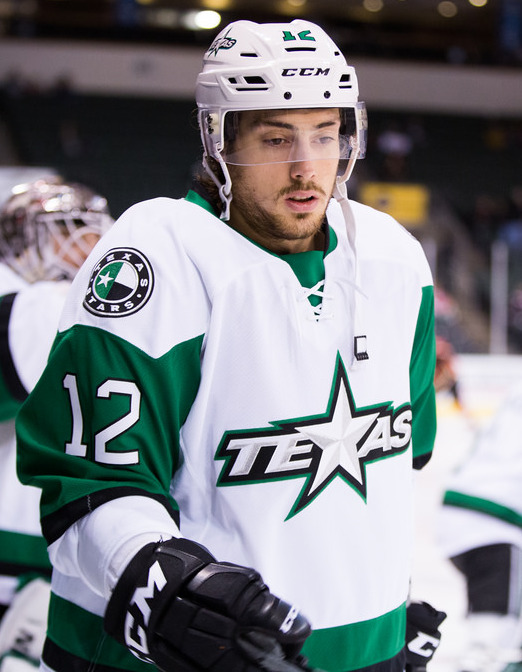
- Blacker with the Texas Stars during the 2015-16 season
- Born: April 19, 1991 (age 35) Toronto, Ontario, Canada
- Height: 6 ft 1 in (185 cm)
- Weight: 190 lb (86 kg; 13 st 8 lb)
- Position: Defence
- Shoots: Right
- KHL team Former teams: Avtomobilist Yekaterinburg; Anaheim Ducks; Thomas Sabo Ice Tigers; Kunlun Red Star; Barys Nur-Sultan
- National team: Kazakhstan
- NHL draft: 58th overall, 2009; Toronto Maple Leafs
- Playing career: 2010–present

Jesse Blacker (Kazakh: Джесси Блэкер; born April 19, 1991) is a Canadian and Kazakh professional ice hockey defenceman. He is currently under contract with Avtomobilist Yekaterinburg of the Kontinental Hockey League (KHL). Blacker was drafted by the Toronto Maple Leafs in the second round (58th overall) of the 2009 NHL entry draft. He appeared in only one game in the National Hockey League (NHL), which was in 2014 for the Anaheim Ducks.

== Playing career ==
Blacker started his junior career with the Windsor Spitfires in the OHL, winning the 2009 Memorial Cup. After finishing his junior season with Owen Sound in 2010, he was signed to a three-year entry-level contract with Toronto Maple Leafs, and played professionally with the Toronto Marlies of the American Hockey League.

On November 16, 2013, he was traded to the Anaheim Ducks along with a conditional third-round draft pick and the Ducks original seventh-round pick (which was previously traded to Toronto) in the 2014 NHL entry draft in exchange for Peter Holland and Brad Staubitz.

In the 2014–15 season, on November 28, 2014, Blacker was recalled by the Ducks made his NHL debut against the Chicago Blackhawks. After one game with the Ducks, Blacker was traded to the Florida Panthers along with a conditional draft pick in exchange for Colby Robak on December 4, 2014.

In the off-season, Blacker was released to free agency by the Panthers after he failed to be tendered a qualifying offer. On July 7, 2015, unable to attain an NHL offer, Blacker signed a one-year AHL contract with the Texas Stars.

Following the 2015–16 campaign with the Stars, he opted to continue his career overseas, signing with the Nürnberg Ice Tigers of the German top-tier Deutsche Eishockey Liga (DEL) on April 28, 2016. After one year in Germany, Blacker headed to China, inking a deal with KHL side HC Kunlun Red Star in June 2017. In his debut season in the KHL in 2017–18, Blacker registered 9 points in 49 games for the blueline.

Having concluded his contract with Kunlun, Blacker remained in the KHL signing as a free agent with Barys Astana on August 7, 2018.

Blacker played three productive seasons with Barys Nur-Sultan, gaining Kazakhstani citizenship during his tenure, before leaving the club as a free agent in securing a two-year contract in continue in the KHL with Avtmobilist Yekaterinburg on May 6, 2021.

== Career statistics ==
=== Regular season and playoffs ===
			Regular season					Playoffs
Season	Team	League	GP	G	A	Pts	PIM	GP	G	A	Pts	PIM
2007–08	Windsor Spitfires	OHL	17	0	4	4	6	5	0	1	1	2
2008–09	Windsor Spitfires	OHL	67	4	17	21	54	20	0	4	4	18
2009–10	Windsor Spitfires	OHL	9	0	3	3	12	—	—	—	—	—
2009–10	Owen Sound Attack	OHL	48	6	24	30	62	—	—	—	—	—
2009–10	Toronto Marlies	AHL	6	0	1	1	0	—	—	—	—	—
2010–11	Owen Sound Attack	OHL	62	10	44	54	83	22	5	6	11	14
2011–12	Toronto Marlies	AHL	58	1	15	16	73	6	0	1	1	4
2012–13	Toronto Marlies	AHL	61	4	7	11	33	4	0	1	1	0
2013–14	Toronto Marlies	AHL	5	1	0	1	4	—	—	—	—	—
2013–14	Norfolk Admirals	AHL	50	5	19	24	19	10	1	0	1	10
2014–15	Norfolk Admirals	AHL	15	0	5	5	9	—	—	—	—	—
2014–15	Anaheim Ducks	NHL	1	0	0	0	0	—	—	—	—	—
2014–15	San Antonio Rampage	AHL	40	6	12	18	24	2	0	1	1	2
2015–16	Texas Stars	AHL	45	1	8	9	28	1	0	1	1	0
2016–17	Thomas Sabo Ice Tigers	DEL	46	8	26	34	67	13	2	3	5	6
2017–18	Kunlun Red Star	KHL	49	1	8	9	26	—	—	—	—	—
2018–19	Barys Astana	KHL	54	3	16	19	30	10	1	4	5	8
2019–20	Barys Nur-Sultan	KHL	55	2	18	20	56	5	0	0	0	0
2020–21	Barys Nur-Sultan	KHL	45	3	7	10	13	5	1	0	1	8
2021–22	Avtomobilist Yekaterinburg	KHL	42	5	19	24	20	—	—	—	—	—
2022–23	Avtomobilist Yekaterinburg	KHL	51	4	7	11	22	7	0	1	1	2
2023–24	Avtomobilist Yekaterinburg	KHL	50	4	10	14	24	15	1	1	2	6
2024–25	Avtomobilist Yekaterinburg	KHL	51	3	15	18	24	2	0	0	0	0
2025–26	Avtomobilist Yekaterinburg	KHL	61	9	26	35	14	4	0	1	1	0
NHL totals			1	0	0	0	0	—	—	—	—	—
KHL totals			458	34	126	160	229	48	3	7	10	24

=== International ===
Year	Team	Event	Result	GP	G	A	Pts	PIM
2020	Kazakhstan	OGQ	DNQ	3	1	0	1	0
2021	Kazakhstan	WC	10th	7	1	1	2	2
2022	Kazakhstan	WC	14th	7	1	4	5	4
Senior totals				17	3	5	8	6

== See also ==
- List of players who played only one game in the NHL
