= 2015 Stanley Cup Final =

2015 ice hockey championship series

	1	2	3	4	5	6	Total
Chicago Blackhawks	2	3	2	2	2	2	4
Tampa Bay Lightning	1	4	3	1	1	0	2
- Location(s): Chicago: United Center (3, 4, 6); Tampa: Amalie Arena (1, 2, 5)
- Coaches: Chicago: Joel Quenneville; Tampa Bay: Jon Cooper
- Captains: Chicago: Jonathan Toews; Tampa Bay: Steven Stamkos
- National anthems: Chicago: Jim Cornelison; Tampa Bay: Sonya Bryson-Kirksey
- Referees: Wes McCauley (1, 3, 5); Kevin Pollock (1, 3, 5); Kelly Sutherland (2, 4, 6); Dan O'Halloran (2, 4, 6)
- Dates: June 3–15, 2015
- MVP: Duncan Keith (Blackhawks)
- Series-winning goal: Duncan Keith (17:13, second)
- Hall of Famers: Blackhawks: Marian Hossa (2020); Duncan Keith (2025)
- Networks: Canada: (English): CBC (French): TVA Sports; United States: (English): NBC (1–2, 5–6), NBCSN (3–4)
- Announcers: (CBC) Jim Hughson, Craig Simpson, and Glenn Healy (TVA) Felix Seguin and Patrick Lalime (NBC/NBCSN) Mike Emrick, Eddie Olczyk (1, 3–6), Mike Milbury (2), and Pierre McGuire (NHL International) Dave Strader and Kevin Weekes

The 2015 Stanley Cup Final was the championship series of the National Hockey League's (NHL) 2014–15 season, and the culmination of the 2015 Stanley Cup playoffs. The Western Conference champion Chicago Blackhawks defeated the Eastern Conference champion Tampa Bay Lightning four games to two to win their sixth championship in franchise history, and their third title in six seasons.

The Lightning, as the club with the better regular-season record, held home-ice advantage in the series. The best-of-seven series was played in a 2–2–1–1–1 format, with Tampa Bay hosting game 1, 2, and 5; and Chicago hosting games 3, 4, and 6. Amalie Arena in Tampa would have hosted game 7 had it been necessary. The series started June 3 and ended on June 15.

Tyler Johnson and Patrick Kane led the Stanley Cup playoffs in points scored with 23 points each.

== Paths to the Finals ==
=== Tampa Bay Lightning ===
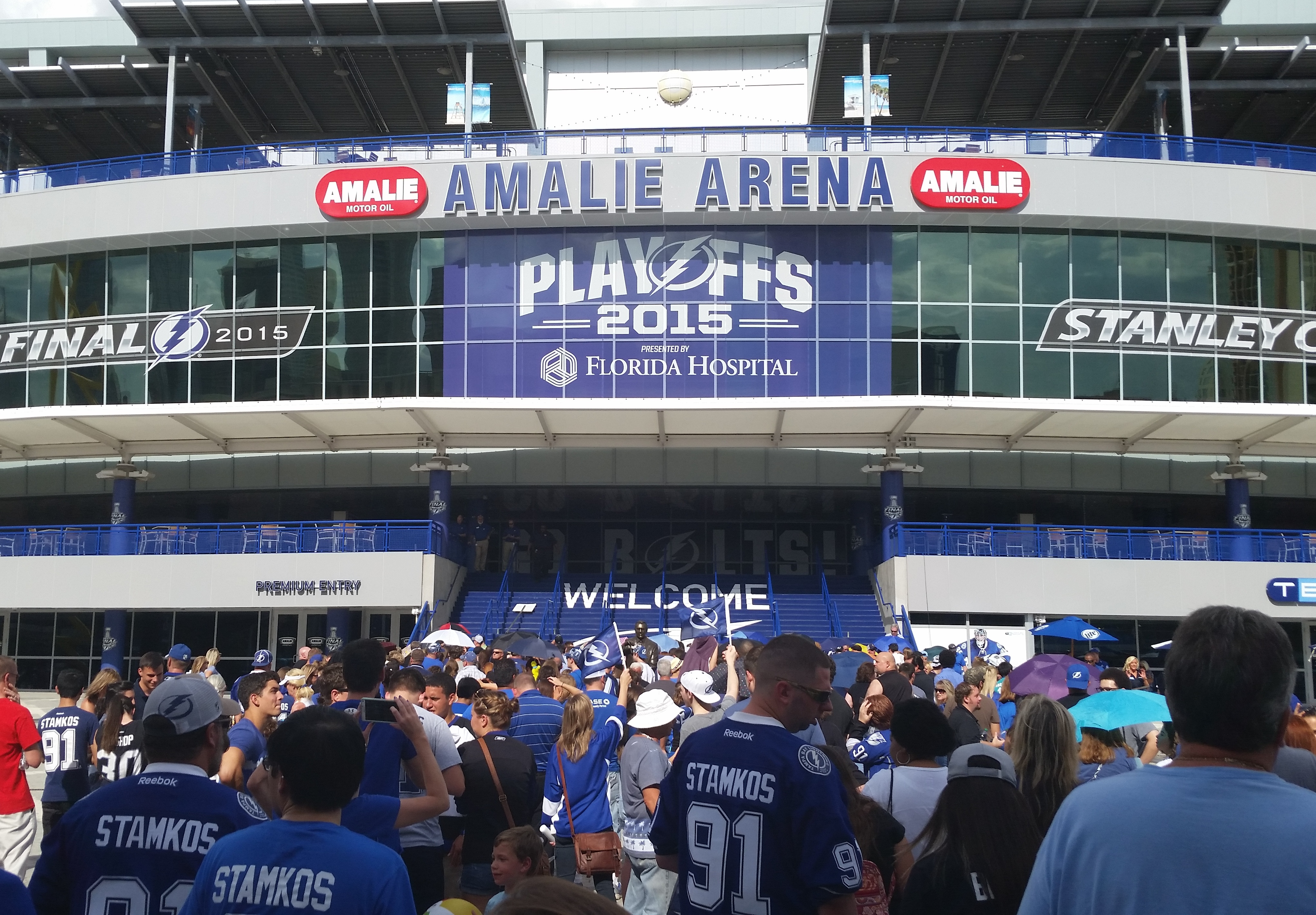
Amalie Arena before game 6

This was Tampa Bay's second Final appearance after winning the Cup in 2004. Since their win in 2004, the Lightning had lost in the conference finals in 2011 in seven games to the Boston Bruins, one win short from reaching the Stanley Cup Final. The Lightning were eliminated in the first round in 2006, 2007, and 2014.

The Lightning entered the 2014–15 season with major re-signings during the offseason including centre Tyler Johnson, wingers Ryan Callahan and Ondrej Palat, and goalie Ben Bishop. In free agency, Tampa Bay picked up centre Brian Boyle and defenseman Anton Stralman from the New York Rangers and Brenden Morrow from the St. Louis Blues. The team made two trades to bolster the defense, picking up Jason Garrison at the 2014 draft and Braydon Coburn just before the 2015 trade deadline.

Tampa Bay compiled 108 points (50–24–8) during the regular season to finish in second place in the Atlantic Division. Centre and team captain Steven Stamkos finished second in goal-scoring during the regular season with 43 goals only behind Washington Capitals winger and captain Alexander Ovechkin, who recorded a league leading 53 goals. Early in the season, Head Coach Jon Cooper nicknamed the team's second line of Johnson, Palat and winger Nikita Kucherov as the "Triplets" because they were so in sync; at the mid-season in January, the three players led the League in plus-minus.

In the playoffs, the Lightning eliminated the Detroit Red Wings in the first round in seven games, the Montreal Canadiens in the second round in six games, and the Presidents' Trophy-winning New York Rangers in the Eastern Conference finals in seven games. They became the first post-1967 expansion team to beat three Original Six teams on the way to the Stanley Cup Final and the only team in NHL history to face an Original Six team at every stage of the playoffs.

=== Chicago Blackhawks ===
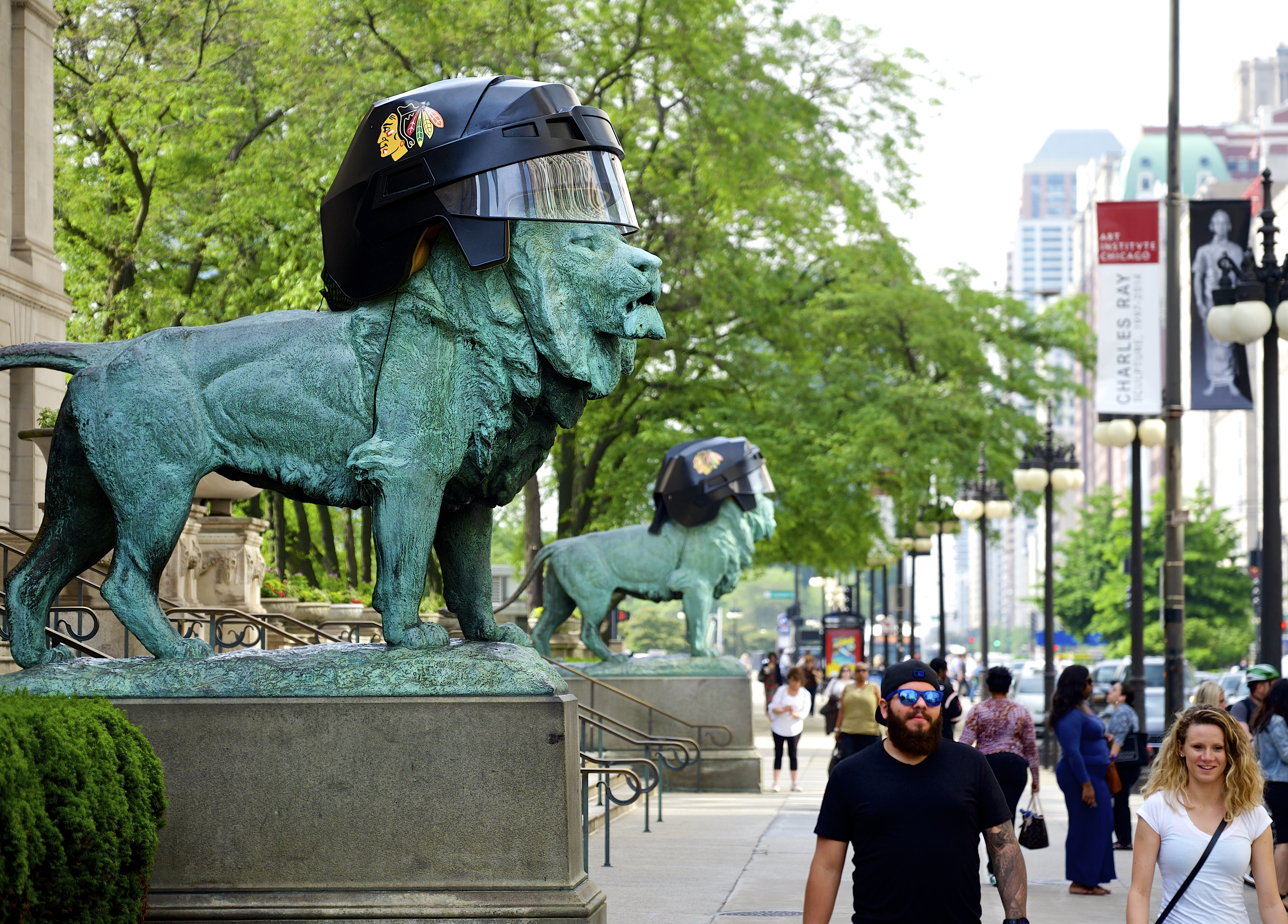
The lion sculptures outside of the Art Institute of Chicago decorated for the Blackhawks' Stanley Cup run

This series marked Chicago's third Final appearance in six seasons; having won the Cup in both 2010 and 2013. This was the team's 13th appearance overall, and they were seeking their sixth overall Cup championship.

The Blackhawks entered the 2014 offseason after being eliminated in the Western Conference finals in seven games by the eventual 2014 Cup champion Los Angeles Kings. On July 1 they signed free agent centre Brad Richards who had won the Stanley Cup and Conn Smythe in 2004 with Tampa. Approaching the NHL trade deadline in early March, Chicago traded for defenseman Kimmo Timonen from the Philadelphia Flyers, centre Antoine Vermette from the Arizona Coyotes, and centre Andrew Desjardins from the San Jose Sharks.

Chicago finished in third place in the Central Division, earning 102 points (48–28–6). Goalie Corey Crawford tied the Canadiens' Carey Price as the William M. Jennings Trophy recipient for allowing a league-low 189 goals during the regular season.

In the playoffs, the Blackhawks eliminated the Nashville Predators in the first round in six games, swept the Minnesota Wild in the second round, and defeated the top seeded and Presidents' Trophy runner-up Anaheim Ducks in the Western Conference finals in seven games. They became the only team in NHL history to face a post-1990 expansion team at every stage of the playoffs.

== Game summaries ==
Number in parentheses represents the player's total goals or assists to that point of the entire four rounds of the playoffs

=== Game 1 ===
June 3	Chicago Blackhawks	2–1	Tampa Bay Lightning	Amalie Arena	Recap

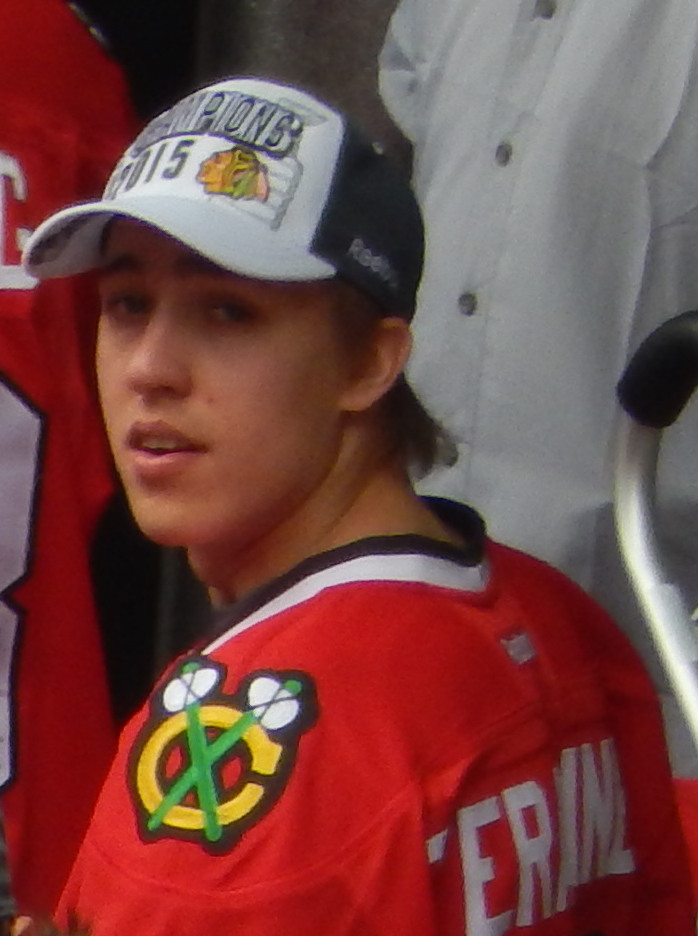
Teuvo Teravainen scored two-points in game 1, assisting on the game-winning goal.

In game 1, Tampa Bay struck first with a deflected goal by Alex Killorn at 4:31 in the first period. The Lightning nursed the lead into the third period with a strong conservative defensive effort, but Teuvo Teravainen and Antoine Vermette scored 118 seconds apart to win the game 2–1 for the Blackhawks. By assisting on Vermette's goal, Teravainen became the second-youngest player (at 20 years and 265 days) in NHL history, after Jaromir Jagr had two assists in game 1 of the 1991 Final (on May 15, 1991, at 19 years and 89 days), to have a multi-point game in the Stanley Cup Final.

Scoring summary
Period	Team	Goal	Assist(s)	Time	Score
1st	TBL	Alex Killorn (8)	Anton Stralman (7) and Valtteri Filppula (9)	04:31	1–0 TBL
2nd	None				
3rd	CHI	Teuvo Teravainen (3)	Duncan Keith (17) and Andrew Shaw (6)	13:28	1–1
3rd	CHI	Antoine Vermette (3)	Teuvo Teravainen (5)	15:26	2–1 CHI
Penalty summary
Period	Team	Player	Penalty	Time	PIM
1st	CHI	Andrew Shaw	Tripping	06:14	2:00
1st	TBL	Jason Garrison	Cross-checking	16:48	2:00
2nd	TBL	Alex Killorn	High-sticking	00:28	2:00
2nd	TBL	Bench (served by Steven Stamkos)	Too many men on the ice	09:48	2:00
2nd	CHI	Kris Versteeg	Goaltender interference	13:28	2:00
3rd	None				

Shots by period
Team	1	2	3	Total
Chicago	7	6	8	21
Tampa Bay	10	8	5	23

=== Game 2 ===
June 6	Chicago Blackhawks	3–4	Tampa Bay Lightning	Amalie Arena	Recap

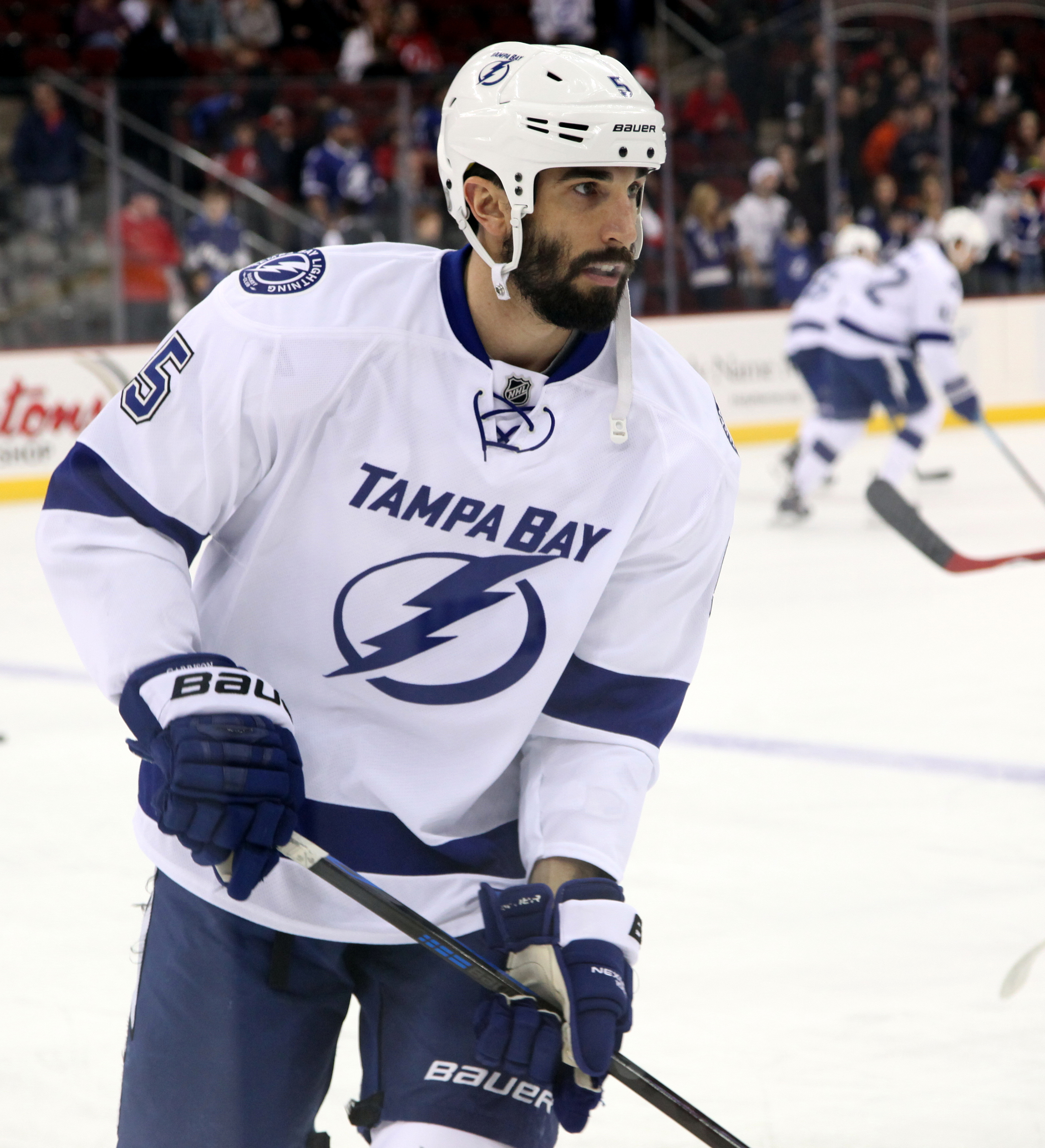
Jason Garrison scored the game-winning goal in game 2.

Jason Garrison's power play goal at 8:49 of the third period proved to be the difference in Tampa Bay's victory in game 2. Lightning starting goaltender Ben Bishop had left the game moments earlier for reasons that were undisclosed at the time, but was later revealed to be a torn groin. He was replaced with Andrei Vasilevskiy who was credited with his first playoff victory. He also became the first goalie to win a Stanley Cup Final game in relief of an injured starter since Lester Patrick helped the New York Rangers defeat the Montreal Maroons in overtime of game 2 of the 1928 Stanley Cup Final, 2–1.

Scoring summary
Period	Team	Goal	Assist(s)	Time	Score
1st	TBL	Cedric Paquette (2)	Ryan Callahan (4) and Victor Hedman (10)	12:56	1–0 TBL
2nd	CHI	Andrew Shaw (5)	Marcus Krüger (2) and Andrew Desjardins (3)	03:04	1–1
2nd	CHI	Teuvo Teravainen (4) – pp	Marian Hossa (10) and Patrick Sharp (9)	05:20	2–1 CHI
2nd	TBL	Nikita Kucherov (10)	Jason Garrison (4) and Braydon Coburn (3)	06:52	2–2
2nd	TBL	Tyler Johnson (13)	Nikita Kucherov (11)	13:58	3–2 TBL
3rd	CHI	Brent Seabrook (7)	Jonathan Toews (10) and Johnny Oduya (5)	03:38	3–3
3rd	TBL	Jason Garrison (2) – pp	Victor Hedman (11) and Ryan Callahan (5)	08:49	4–3 TBL
Penalty summary
Period	Team	Player	Penalty	Time	PIM
1st	CHI	Johnny Oduya	Tripping	18:28	2:00
2nd	TBL	Alex Killorn	Hooking	04:26	2:00
2nd	TBL	Braydon Coburn	Holding	09:24	2:00
3rd	CHI	Patrick Sharp	Slashing	04:59	2:00
3rd	CHI	Patrick Sharp	High-sticking	07:17	2:00
3rd	TBL	Andrej Sustr	Delay of game (puck over glass)	13:08	2:00

Shots by period
Team	1	2	3	Total
Chicago	11	8	10	29
Tampa Bay	12	10	2	24

=== Game 3 ===
June 8	Tampa Bay Lightning	3–2	Chicago Blackhawks	United Center	Recap

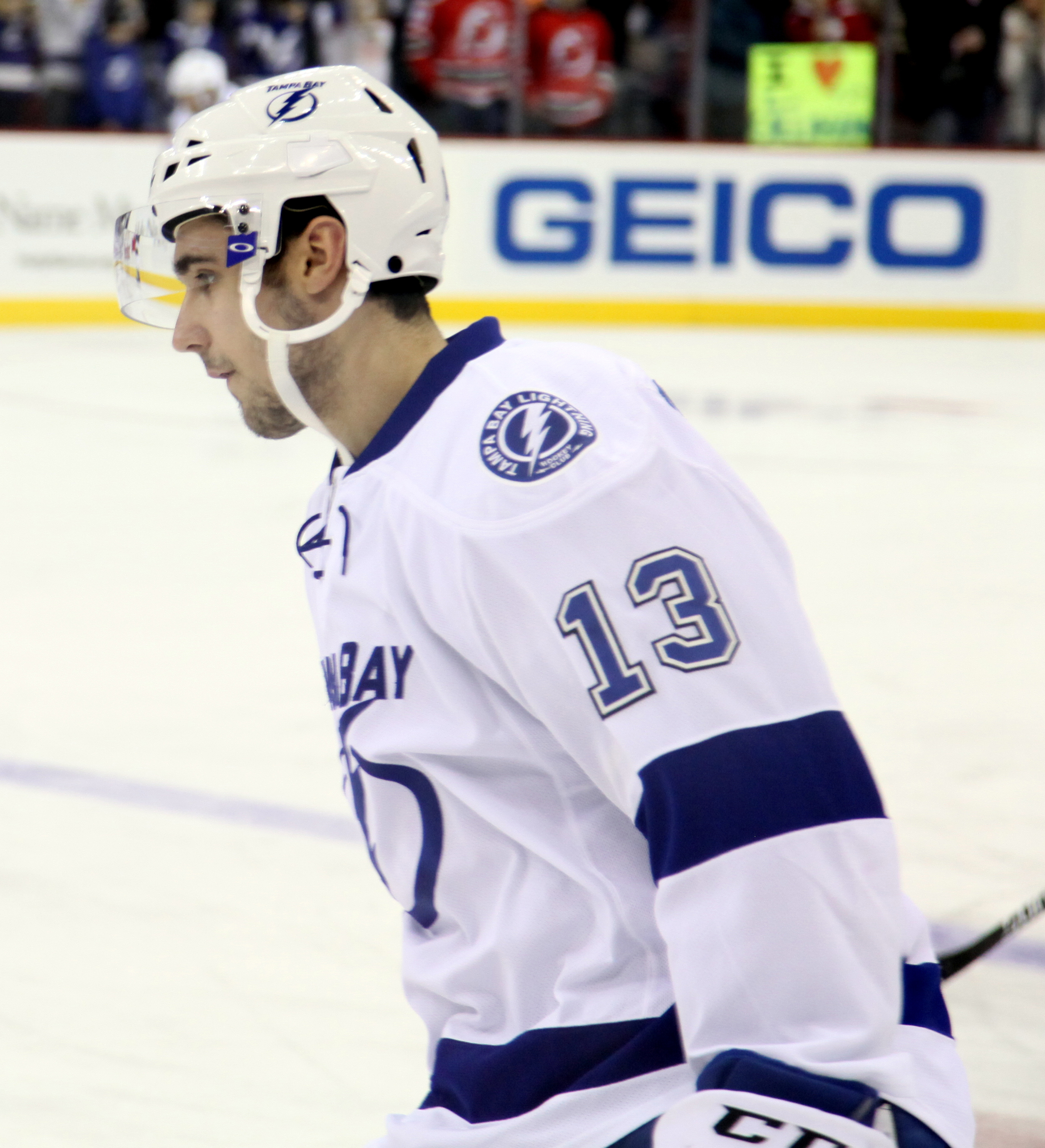
Cédric Paquette scored the game-winning goal in game 3.

The series moved to Chicago for game 3. There was some debate on whether Ben Bishop or rookie goaltender Andrei Vasilevskiy for Tampa Bay, but regular starter Bishop started the game for Tampa Bay. For the third time in a row, Tampa Bay struck first, on Ryan Callahan's slapshot goal at 5:09 of the first. Brad Richards tied it up on a power-play goal and the teams were tied after the first period. The first period was dominated by Chicago, who outshot Tampa Bay 19–7. The second period was dominated by Tampa Bay, which outshot Chicago 17–7, but there was no scoring. In the third period, Brandon Saad gave Chicago its first lead at 4:14, but Tampa Bay countered on the next shift on a goal by Ondrej Palat to tie the score once again. Late in the third period, Victor Hedman led a rush down ice for Tampa Bay and passed to Cedric Paquette who scored to put the Lightning ahead again. The Lightning were able to defend their lead to win the game 3–2 and take a series lead two games to one.

Scoring summary
Period	Team	Goal	Assist(s)	Time	Score
1st	TBL	Ryan Callahan (2)	Victor Hedman (12) and J. T. Brown (1)	05:09	1–0 TBL
1st	CHI	Brad Richards (3) – pp	Marian Hossa (11) and Andrew Shaw (7)	14:22	1–1
2nd	None				
3rd	CHI	Brandon Saad (7)	Marian Hossa (12) and Duncan Keith (18)	04:14	2–1 CHI
3rd	TBL	Ondrej Palat (8)	Nikita Kucherov (12) and Tyler Johnson (10)	04:27	2–2
3rd	TBL	Cedric Paquette (3)	Victor Hedman (13) and Ryan Callahan (6)	16:49	3–2 TBL
Penalty summary
Period	Team	Player	Penalty	Time	PIM
1st	CHI	Brandon Saad	Cross-checking	08:12	2:00
1st	TBL	Braydon Coburn	Tripping	08:12	2:00
1st	TBL	Braydon Coburn	Hooking	12:42	2:00
2nd	TBL	Nikita Kucherov	Tripping	08:53	2:00
2nd	CHI	Bryan Bickell	Roughing	15:18	2:00
2nd	CHI	Brandon Saad	Goaltender interference	15:52	2:00
3rd	None				

Shots by period
Team	1	2	3	Total
Tampa Bay	7	17	8	32
Chicago	19	7	12	38

=== Game 4 ===
June 10	Tampa Bay Lightning	1–2	Chicago Blackhawks	United Center	Recap

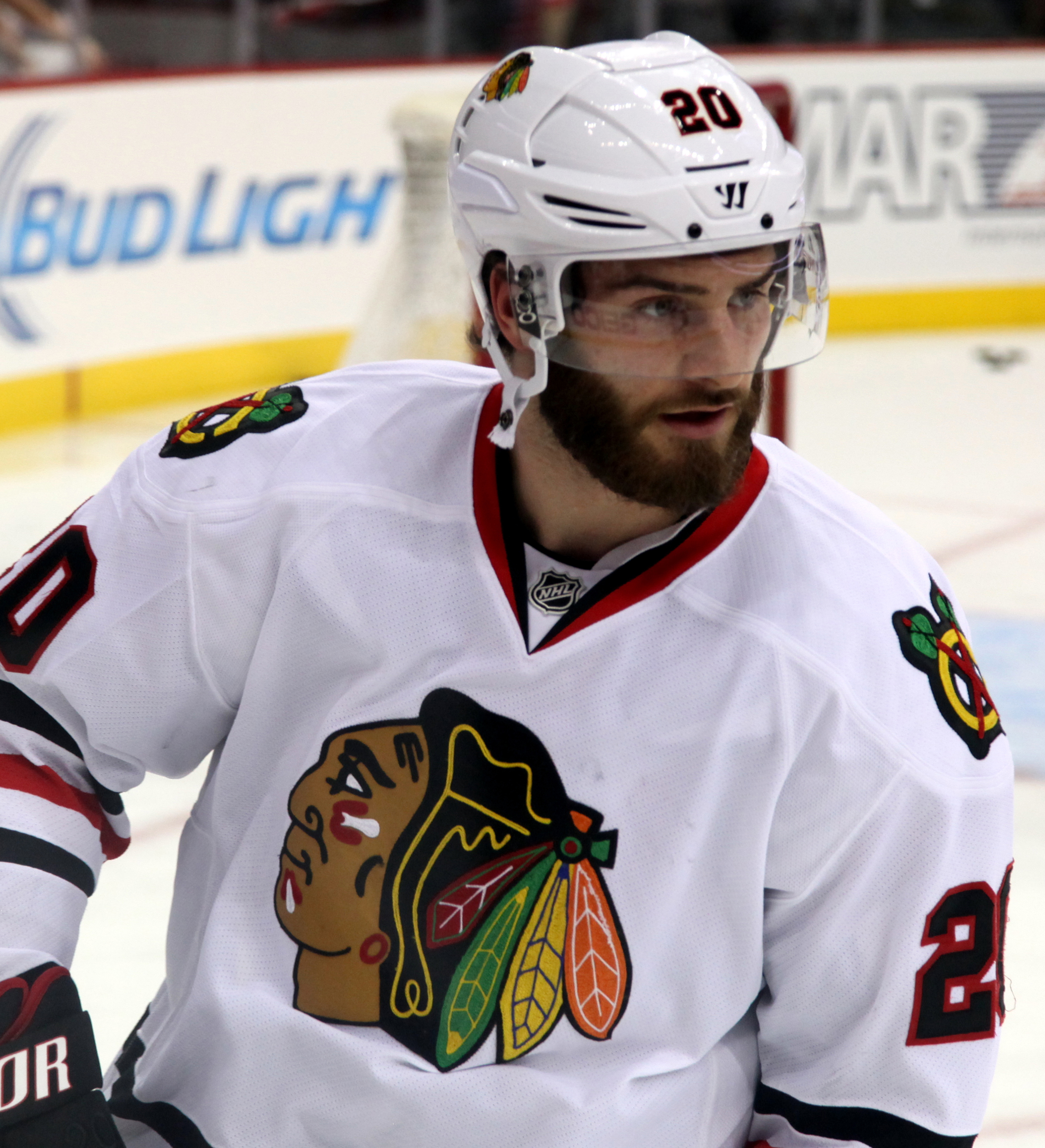
Brandon Saad scored the game-winning goal in game 4.

The Lightning chose to rest injured goaltender Ben Bishop for game 4 in favor of rookie Andrei Vasilevskiy. The Lightning protected Vasilevskiy with tight defensive play, allowing only two shots by the Blackhawks in the first period, which was scoreless. For the first time in the series, the Blackhawks scored the first goal, on a goal by Jonathan Toews at 6:40 of the second. Alex Killorn tied it for the Lightning at 11:47 and the game was tied 1–1 after two periods. In the third, the Blackhawks' Brandon Saad muscled his way to the goal and scored on a backhand past Vasilevskiy at 6:22 to put the Blackhawks ahead. The game's pace picked up as the Lightning tried to tie the score but the Blackhawks goaltender Corey Crawford made several outstanding saves to shut out Tampa Bay the rest of the way. The win tied the series at two games apiece. It was the first time since 1968 that the first four Stanley Cup Final games were all decided by one goal.

Scoring summary
Period	Team	Goal	Assist(s)	Time	Score
1st	None				
2nd	CHI	Jonathan Toews (10)	Patrick Sharp (10) and Marian Hossa (13)	06:40	1–0 CHI
2nd	TBL	Alex Killorn (9)	Valtteri Filppula (10) and Steven Stamkos (11)	11:47	1–1
3rd	CHI	Brandon Saad (8)	Patrick Kane (11)	06:22	2–1 CHI
Penalty summary
Period	Team	Player	Penalty	Time	PIM
1st	CHI	Brent Seabrook	Interference	09:10	2:00
1st	TBL	Jason Garrison	Interference	11:41	2:00
1st	CHI	Jonathan Toews	High sticking	12:42	2:00
1st	CHI	Kimmo Timonen	Hooking	16:33	2:00
1st	TBL	Alex Killorn	High sticking	19:08	2:00
2nd	CHI	Brent Seabrook	Cross-checking	07:19	2:00
3rd	TBL	Steven Stamkos	Delay of game (puck over glass)	01:04	2:00

Shots by period
Team	1	2	3	Total
Tampa Bay	9	8	8	25
Chicago	2	12	5	19

=== Game 5 ===
June 13	Chicago Blackhawks	2–1	Tampa Bay Lightning	Amalie Arena	Recap

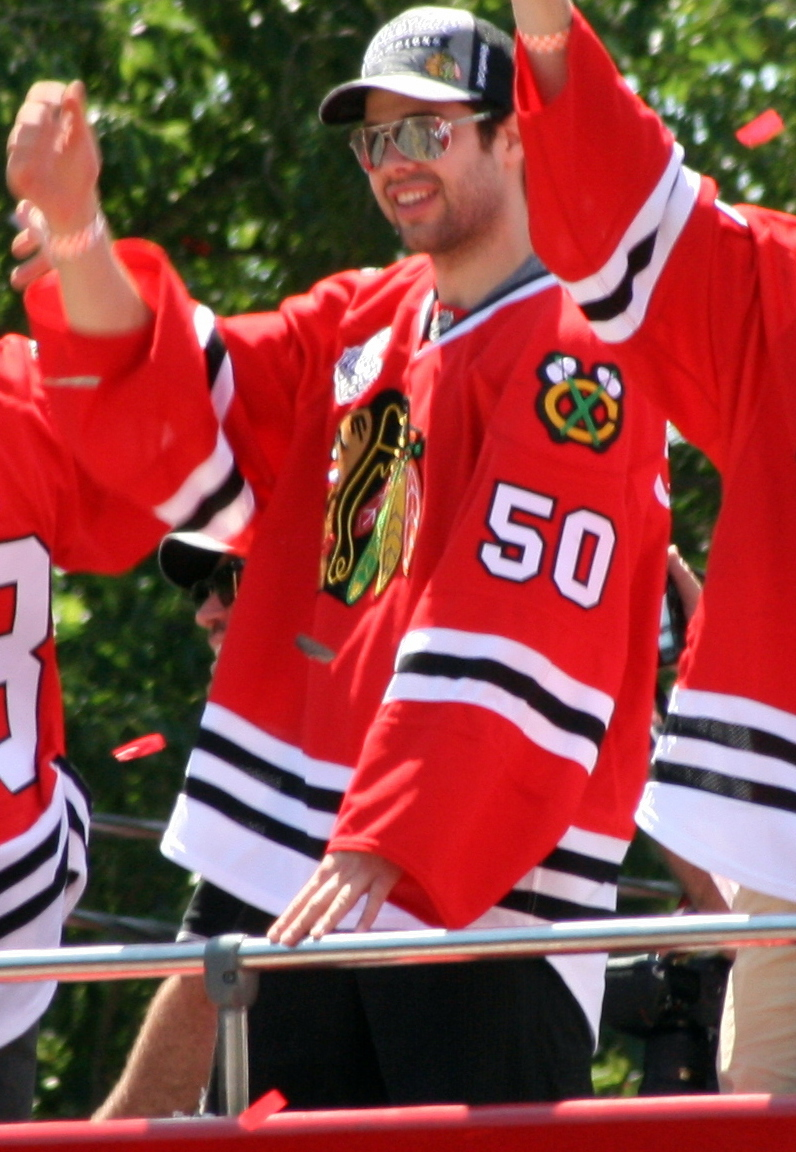
Corey Crawford saved 28 of 29 shots faced in game 5.

The series returned to Tampa for game 5 and Ben Bishop returned to the net for the Lightning. The Blackhawks scored first for the second consecutive game, this time on a miscue by Bishop and Lightning defenseman Victor Hedman. The two collided and Patrick Sharp skated to the empty net with the puck, scoring at 6:11 of the first, a lead they held until 10:53 of the second when Valtteri Filppula scored to tie the score 1–1. The teams were tied going into the third, but Antoine Vermette scored for the Blackhawks at 2:00 of third and the lead held up as the Blackhawks played tight defense the rest of the way. The Blackhawks took the lead in the series three games to two, to give themselves a chance to win the Cup at home, something the franchise has not done since 1938. For the second time in Final history and the first since 1951, wherein all five games that had to be played went to overtime, all games of the series through game 5 were decided by one goal, with neither team leading by more than one goal.

Scoring summary
Period	Team	Goal	Assist(s)	Time	Score
1st	CHI	Patrick Sharp (5)	Teuvo Teravainen (6) and Jonathan Toews (11)	06:11	1–0 CHI
2nd	TBL	Valtteri Filppula (4)	Jason Garrison (5) and Anton Stralman (8)	10:53	1–1
3rd	CHI	Antoine Vermette (4)	Kris Versteeg (1)	02:00	2–1 CHI
Penalty summary
Period	Team	Player	Penalty	Time	PIM
1st	None				
2nd	TBL	Cedric Paquette	Hooking	00:47	2:00
2nd	CHI	Brandon Saad	Slashing	11:25	2:00
3rd	TBL	Bench (served by Jonathan Drouin)	Too many men on the ice	19:51	2:00

Shots by period
Team	1	2	3	Total
Chicago	14	8	7	29
Tampa Bay	5	12	15	32

=== Game 6 ===
June 15	Tampa Bay Lightning	0–2	Chicago Blackhawks	United Center	Recap

External videos
- Game 6 Full replay (NHL International's feed) on the NHL's official YouTube channel

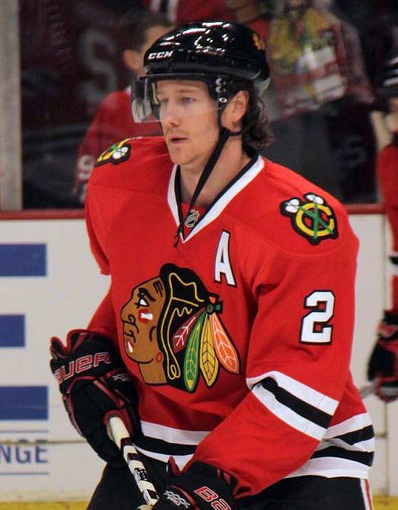
Duncan Keith scored the Stanley Cup-clinching goal in game 6.

In game 6, the teams were scoreless after the first period. In the first period, Lightning captain Steven Stamkos put a shot off the crossbar and was stopped on a breakaway early in the second by Corey Crawford but it was the Blackhawks who scored first on a goal by Duncan Keith on a rebound of his own shot near the end of the second period to put Chicago ahead 1–0 after two periods. In the third period, the Blackhawks' Patrick Kane scored on a pass from Brad Richards and play by Brandon Saad to put the 'Hawks ahead 2–0, the first two-goal lead of the series. The Blackhawks then frustrated the Lightning the rest of the way to win the game 2–0, a shutout for Crawford and the Stanley Cup championship. It was revealed after the game that the Lightning's goaltender Ben Bishop had played with a torn groin muscle since game 2 and Tyler Johnson was playing with a fractured wrist, injured in game 1. This was also the first time since 1938, when they beat the Toronto Maple Leafs in the fourth game of a best-of-five Final at Chicago Stadium, and the first time at the United Center that the Blackhawks won the Stanley Cup on home ice.

Scoring summary
Period	Team	Goal	Assist(s)	Time	Score
1st	None				
2nd	CHI	Duncan Keith (3)	Patrick Kane (12) and Brad Richards (10)	17:13	1–0 CHI
3rd	CHI	Patrick Kane (11)	Brad Richards (11) and Brandon Saad (3)	14:46	2–0 CHI
Penalty summary
Period	Team	Player	Penalty	Time	PIM
1st	TBL	Cedric Paquette	Tripping	08:35	2:00
1st	TBL	Brian Boyle	Roughing	13:53	2:00
2nd	TBL	Ondrej Palat	Elbowing	19:13	2:00
3rd	CHI	Andrew Desjardins	Tripping	16:21	2:00

Shots by period
Team	1	2	3	Total
Tampa Bay	4	7	14	25
Chicago	13	10	9	32

== Team rosters ==
=== Chicago Blackhawks ===
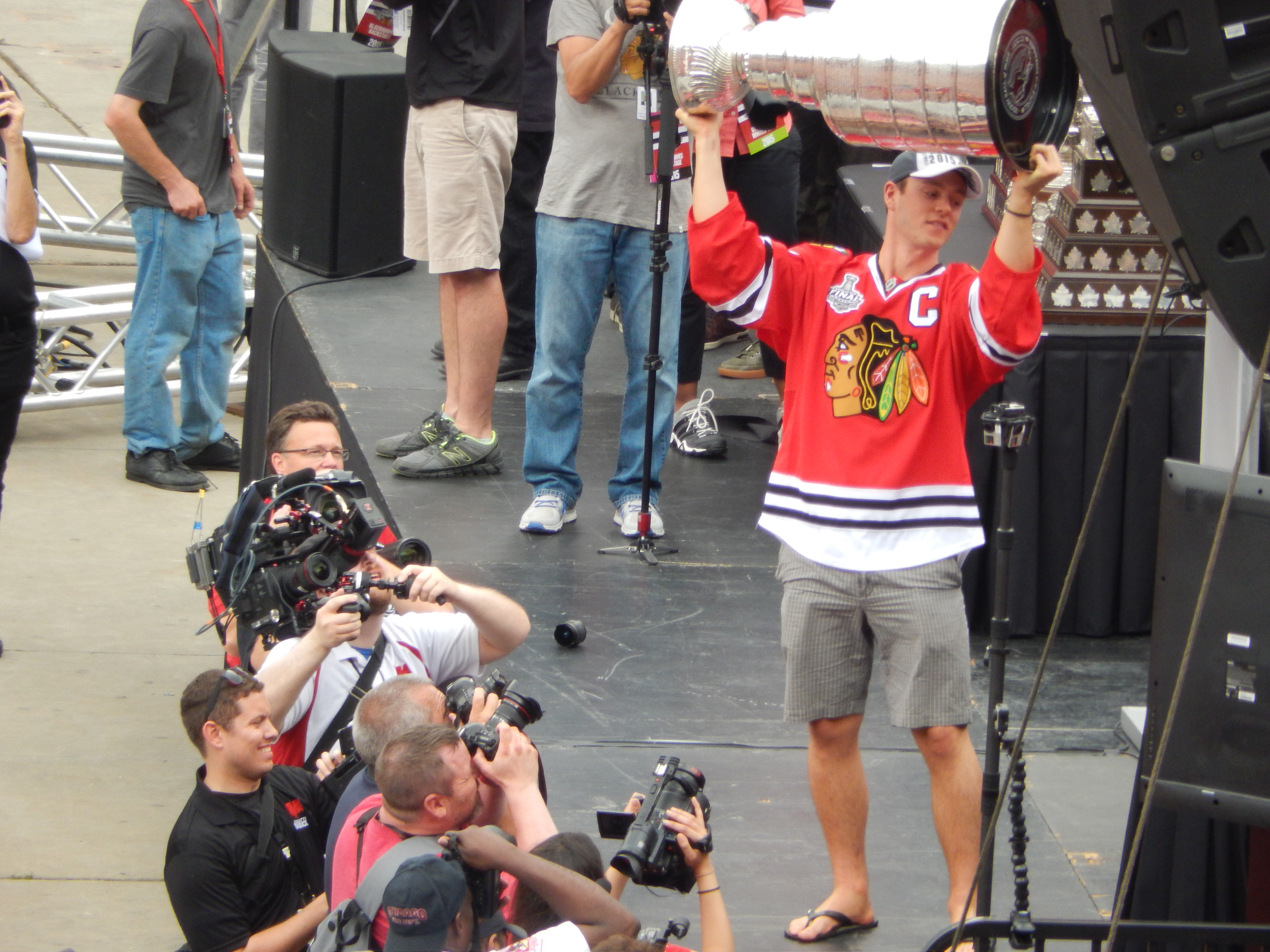
Jonathan Toews captained the Blackhawks to their sixth championship in franchise history, and their third championship in six seasons

#	Nat	Player	Position	Hand	Age	Acquired	Place of birth	Finals appearance
29	(Canada)	Bryan Bickell	LW	L	29	2004	Bowmanville, Ontario	third (2010, 2013)
13	(Canada)	Daniel Carcillo	LW	L	30	2014	King City, Ontario	fourth (did not play; 2010, 2013, 2014)
50	(Canada)	Corey Crawford	G	L	30	2003	Montreal, Quebec	second (2013)
26	(Canada)	Kyle Cumiskey	D	L	28	2014	Abbotsford, British Columbia	first
33	(United States)	Scott Darling	G	L	26	2014	Newport News, Virginia	first
11	(Canada)	Andrew Desjardins	C	L	28	2015	Lively, Ontario	first
4	(Sweden)	Niklas Hjalmarsson	D	L	27	2005	Eksjö, Sweden	third (2010, 2013)
81	(Slovakia)	Marian Hossa	RW	L	36	2009	Stará Ľubovňa, Czechoslovakia	fifth (2008, 2009, 2010, 2013)
88	(United States)	Patrick Kane	RW	L	26	2007	Buffalo, New York	third (2010, 2013)
2	(Canada)	Duncan Keith – A	D	L	31	2002	Winnipeg, Manitoba	third (2010, 2013)
16	(Sweden)	Marcus Kruger	C	L	25	2009	Stockholm, Sweden	second (2013)
42	(Sweden)	Joakim Nordstrom	C	L	23	2010	Stockholm, Sweden	first
27	(Sweden)	Johnny Oduya	D	L	33	2012	Stockholm, Sweden	second (2013)
31	(Finland)	Antti Raanta	G	L	26	2013	Rauma, Finland	first
91	(Canada)	Brad Richards	C	L	35	2014	Murray Harbour, Prince Edward Island	third (2004, 2014)
32	(Czech Republic)	Michal Rozsival	D	R	36	2012	Vlašim, Czechoslovakia	second (2013)
5	(Sweden)	David Rundblad	D	R	24	2013	Lycksele, Sweden	first
20	(United States)	Brandon Saad	LW	L	22	2011	Pittsburgh, Pennsylvania	second (2013)
7	(Canada)	Brent Seabrook	D	R	30	2003	Richmond, British Columbia	third (2010, 2013)
10	(Canada)	Patrick Sharp – A	LW/C	R	33	2005	Winnipeg, Manitoba	third (2010, 2013)
65	(Canada)	Andrew Shaw	C	R	23	2011	Belleville, Ontario	second (2013)
86	(Finland)	Teuvo Teravainen	W/C	L	20	2012	Helsinki, Finland	first
44	(Finland)	Kimmo Timonen	D	L	40	2015	Kuopio, Finland	second (2010)
19	(Canada)	Jonathan Toews – C	C	L	27	2006	Winnipeg, Manitoba	third (2010, 2013)
57	(United States)	Trevor van Riemsdyk	D	R	23	2014	Middletown, New Jersey	first
80	(Canada)	Antoine Vermette	C	L	32	2015	Saint-Agapit, Quebec	second (2007)
23	(Canada)	Kris Versteeg	LW	R	29	2013	Lethbridge, Alberta	second (2010)

=== Tampa Bay Lightning ===
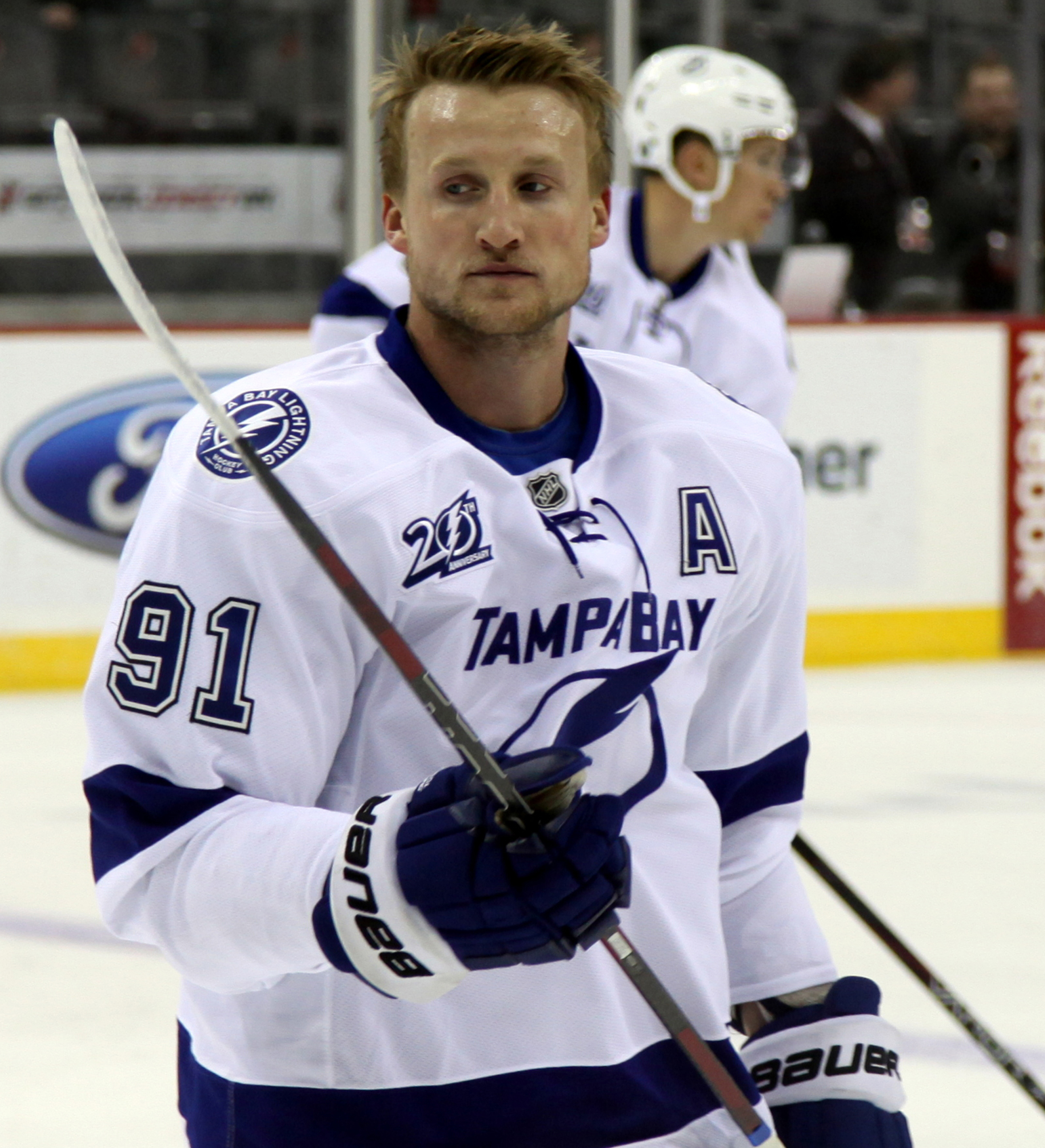
Steven Stamkos captained the Lightning to their second Stanley Cup Final appearance, and their first in ten seasons

#	Nat	Player	Position	Hand	Age	Acquired	Place of birth	Finals appearance
30	(United States)	Ben Bishop	G	L	28	2013	Denver, Colorado	first
11	(United States)	Brian Boyle – A	C	L	30	2014	Hingham, Massachusetts	second (2014)
23	(United States)	J. T. Brown	RW	R	24	2013	Burnsville, Minnesota	first
25	(United States)	Matt Carle	D	L	30	2012	Anchorage, Alaska	second (2010)
55	(Canada)	Braydon Coburn	D	L	30	2015	Calgary, Alberta	second (2010)
24	(United States)	Ryan Callahan – A	RW	R	30	2014	Rochester, New York	first
27	(Canada)	Jonathan Drouin	LW	L	20	2013	Sainte-Agathe-des-Monts, Quebec	first
51	(Finland)	Valtteri Filppula	C	L	31	2013	Vantaa, Finland	third (2008, 2009)
5	(Canada)	Jason Garrison	D	L	30	2014	White Rock, British Columbia	first
50	(Latvia)	Kristers Gudlevskis	G	L	22	2013	Aizkraukle, Latvia	first
77	(Sweden)	Victor Hedman	D	L	24	2009	Örnsköldsvik, Sweden	first
9	(United States)	Tyler Johnson	C	R	24	2011	Spokane, Washington	first
17	(Canada)	Alex Killorn	C	L	25	2007	Halifax, Nova Scotia	first
86	(Russia)	Nikita Kucherov	RW	L	21	2011	Maykop, Russia	first
42	(Canada)	Jonathan Marchessault	C	R	24	2014	Cap-Rouge, Quebec	first
10	(Canada)	Brenden Morrow	LW	L	36	2014	Carlyle, Saskatchewan	second (2000)
90	(Russia)	Vladislav Namestnikov	C	L	22	2011	Voskresensk, Russia	first
89	(Russia)	Nikita Nesterov	D	L	22	2011	Chelyabinsk, Russia	first
18	(Czech Republic)	Ondrej Palat – A	LW	R	24	2011	Frýdek-Místek, Czechoslovakia	first
13	(Canada)	Cedric Paquette	C	L	21	2012	Gaspé, Quebec	first
91	(Canada)	Steven Stamkos – C	C	R	25	2008	Markham, Ontario	first
6	(Sweden)	Anton Stralman	D	R	28	2014	Tibro, Sweden	second (2014)
62	(Czech Republic)	Andrej Sustr	D	R	24	2013	Plzeň, Czechoslovakia	first
88	(Russia)	Andrei Vasilevskiy	G	L	20	2012	Tyumen, Russia	first

== Stanley Cup engraving ==
The 2015 Stanley Cup was presented to Blackhawks captain Jonathan Toews by NHL Commissioner Gary Bettman following the Blackhawks' 2–0 win over the Lightning in game 6.

The following Blackhawks players and staff had their names engraved on the Stanley Cup

2014–15 Chicago Blackhawks

=== Players ===
Centres

- 11 Andrew Desjardins*
- 16 Marcus Kruger*
- 19 Jonathan Toews (Captain)
- 42 Joakim Nordstrom †
- 65 Andrew Shaw*
- 80 Antoine Vermette
- 91 Brad Richards

Wingers

- 10 Patrick Sharp* (A)
- 13 Daniel Carcillo †
- 20 Brandon Saad
- 23 Kris Versteeg
- 29 Bryan Bickell
- 81 Marian Hossa
- 86 Teuvo Teravainen*
- 88 Patrick Kane

Defencemen

- 2 Duncan Keith (A)
- 4 Niklas Hjalmarsson
- 5 David Rundblad
- 7 Brent Seabrook
- 26 Kyle Cumiskey
- 27 Johnny Oduya
- 32 Michal Rozsival
- 44 Kimmo Timonen
- 57 Trevor van Riemsdyk

Goaltenders

- 33 Scott Darling
- 50 Corey Crawford
- * Played both centre and wing.
- † Exemption granted to engrave the name of a player who did not automatically qualify. (Note: Automatic qualification for a player's name to be engraved on the Stanley Cup: Playing in (for a goaltender, dressing for) at least one Stanley Cup Final game or at least half of regular season games for the Stanley Cup winning team.)

=== Coaching and administrative staff ===
- W. Rocky Wirtz (Owner/Chairman/Governor), John McDonough (President/Chief Executive Officer/Alt. Governor), Jay Blunk (Exec. Vice President),
- Stan Bowman (Vice President/General Manager), Al MacIsaac (Vice President of Hockey Operations), Norm Maciver (Asst. General Manager), William Scotty Bowman (Sr. Advisor Hockey Operations),
- Joel Quenneville (Head Coach), Mike Kitchen (Asst. Coach), Kevin Dineen (Asst. Coach), Jimmy Waite (Goaltending Coach), Matt Meacham (Video Coach), Paul Goodman (Strength & Conditioning Coach)
- Mike Gapski (Athletic Trainer), Troy Parchman (Equipment Manager), Jeff Thomas (Asst. Athletic Trainer), Pawel Prylinski (Massage Therapist), Jeff Heintzleman (Asst. Equipment Manager)
- Pierre Gauthier (Director of Player Personnel), Mark Kelly (Sr. Director of Amateur Scouting),
- Barry Smith (Director of Player Development), Ryan Stewart (Director of Pro Scouting), Ron Anderson (Director of Player Recruitment),
- Tony Ommen (Sr. Director of Team Services), Mark Bernard (Director of Hockey Administration/Rockford(AHL) General Manager), Dr. Michael Terry (Head Team Physician)

=== Engraving notes ===
- Chicago successfully requested an exemption to engrave the names of two players who did not automatically qualify.
  - #13 Daniel Carcillo (LW) – spent the whole season with Chicago, only 39 games played, not dressed in the playoffs due to injury.
  - #42 Joakim Nordstrom (C) – played 38 games for Chicago, 23 games for Rockford, played three playoff games, including one game in the conference finals.
- Scotty Bowman won his 14th Stanley Cup in 1973, 1976, 1977, 1978, 1979 (Montreal), 1991, 1992 (Pittsburgh), 1997, 1998, 2002, 2008 (Detroit), 2010, 2013, 2015 (Chicago)

=== Left off Stanley Cup ===
- Six players who were on the roster during the Final did not qualify to have their names engraved. Chicago did not request an exemption for any of them.

Included in the team picture

- #31 Antti Raanta – played 14 games and was dressed in 51 games for Chicago. He also played 11 games for Rockford (AHL). Raanta was sent to the minors on February 22, 2015, when Scott Darling was recalled. Raanta rejoined Chicago on April 12 but did not dress in the playoffs. His name was not included on the Cup since Raanta had spent time playing in the minors after the trading deadline. He was, however, in the team picture at centre ice and did receive a personal day with the Cup over the summer.
- #43 Viktor Svedberg (D) – did not play in the regular season or playoffs
- D. J. Kogut (Equipment Asst.), Jeff Uyenko (Equipment Asst.) – got championship rings

Not in the team picture

- #38 Ryan Hartman (RW) – played 5 regular season games and none in the playoffs
- #24 Phillip Danault (C) – played 2 regular season games and none in the playoffs
- #47 Michael Paliotta (D) – played 1 regular season game and none in the playoffs
- #17 Ville Pokka (D) – did not play in the regular season or playoffs
- Clinton Reif (Asst. Equipment Manager) who died on December 21, 2014, was also left off. Reif is on the Cup with Chicago in 2010 and 2013.

== Television ==
In the U.S., the Final series were split between NBC and NBCSN, called by NBC Sports' lead commentary team of Mike Emrick, Eddie Olczyk, and Pierre McGuire; it was originally announced that games two and three were to be broadcast by NBCSN, with the rest on NBC. Game 2 was moved to NBC to serve as a lead-out for its coverage of the 2015 Belmont Stakes in favor of game 4 on NBCSN. As Olczyk was also a contributor to NBC's Belmont coverage, he missed game 2.

In Canada, all six games were broadcast by CBC Television (through Hockey Night in Canada, as produced by Sportsnet through a brokerage agreement) in English, TVA Sports in French, and Omni Television in Punjabi. These were the first Stanley Cup Final under Rogers Communications' exclusive national broadcast rights to the NHL in Canada.

This was the second-most watched Stanley Cup Final on U.S. television since 1995, trailing only the 2013 Stanley Cup Final, with an average 3.2 Nielsen rating and 5.6 million viewers on NBC and NBCSN. Game 6 was seen by 7.6 million viewers nationally on NBC. Ratings for game 6 were especially strong in Chicago and Tampa Bay: it was the most-watched NHL broadcast locally in Chicago history, and the second-highest in Tampa Bay. By contrast, ratings in Canada dropped significantly, making it the lowest-rated Stanley Cup Final since 2009. Game 6, facing competition from a Team Canada match in the 2015 FIFA Women's World Cup, and the Toronto Blue Jays (which had seen increased ratings due to a long winning streak), was the lowest-rated deciding NHL playoff game on Canadian television since the 2003 Stanley Cup Final.

U.S. Ratings
Game	Network	Ratings (households)	American audience (in millions)
1	NBC	3.3	5.547
2	NBC	3.9	6.549
3	NBCSN	2.2	3.896
4	NBCSN	2.2	3.914
5	NBC	3.0	5.260
6	NBC	4.4	8.005

== Notes ==
Preceded by Los Angeles Kings; 2014	Chicago Blackhawks; Stanley Cup champions 2015	Succeeded by Pittsburgh Penguins; 2016
