= Bryan Bickell =

Canadian ice hockey player (born 1986)

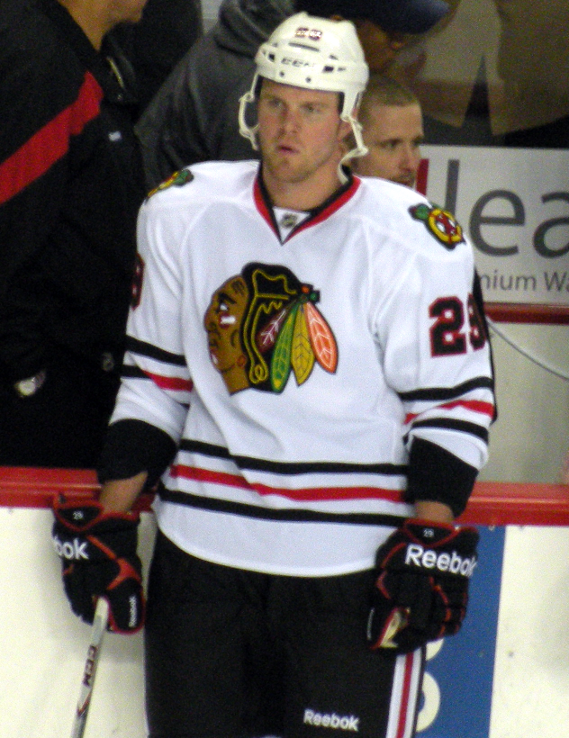
- Bickell with the Chicago Blackhawks in February 2012
- Born: March 9, 1986 (age 40) Bowmanville, Ontario, Canada
- Height: 6 ft 4 in (193 cm)
- Weight: 233 lb (106 kg; 16 st 9 lb)
- Position: Left wing
- Shot: Left
- Played for: Chicago Blackhawks; Orli Znojmo; Carolina Hurricanes
- NHL draft: 41st overall, 2004; Chicago Blackhawks
- Playing career: 2006–2017

Bryan Bickell (born March 9, 1986) is a Canadian former professional ice hockey player who played for the Chicago Blackhawks and the Carolina Hurricanes of the National Hockey League (NHL). He won the Stanley Cup with the Chicago Blackhawks in 2013 and 2015, and played in four early playoff games during the team's run to the 2010 Stanley Cup championship. Bickell spent nearly 10 years with the Blackhawks organization before being traded to the Hurricanes before the 2016–17 season. He was diagnosed with multiple sclerosis later that year and retired from playing at the end of the season.

== Early life ==
Bickell was born to Bill and Anne Bickell. He was raised in Orono, Ontario with an older sister, Ashley. In addition to hockey, Bickell was also interested in playing baseball during his youth. He was an outfielder and pitcher for the Kendal Royals, where he was scouted by the New York Yankees. Bickell ultimately choose to focus his career on hockey, and traveled to Ottawa to play for the Ottawa 67's. Bickell had several jobs prior to becoming a full-time hockey player. He was a construction worker and worked as a clubhouse assistant to the Ottawa Senators, where he cleaned laundry, performed custodian duties and met future Chicago Blackhawk teammates Antoine Vermette and Marián Hossa, who were both playing on the Senators.

== Playing career ==
=== Amateur career ===
Bickell grew up playing minor ice hockey with the Orono Leafs program, before playing AAA for the Central Ontario Wolves. He played in the 2000 Quebec International Pee-Wee Hockey Tournament with the Toronto Red Wings.

For his Bantam season, Bickell was moved to the Toronto Red Wings of the GTHL for one season before being drafted in the second round (36th overall) in the 2002 OHL Priority Selection by the Ottawa 67's. Bickell was a member of the Bantam All-Ontario champions Toronto Red Wings with future Chicago Blackhawk teammate Dave Bolland.

=== Professional ===
The Chicago Blackhawks drafted Bickell in the second round of the 2004 NHL entry draft with the 41st overall pick.

==== Chicago Blackhawks (2006–2016) ====
After signing a three-year, entry-level contract on June 5, 2006, Bickell left the Ontario Hockey League (OHL) to play for the Norfolk Admirals of the American Hockey League during the 2006–07 season. Bickell later made his NHL debut on April 5, 2007, where he scored his first goal against Chris Osgood of the Detroit Red Wings. He would go on to play the final two games of the season after for the Blackhawks against the Red Wings and the Dallas Stars, adding on another goal on Marty Turco in the season finale on April 8 in a 3–2 loss to the Stars. Along with playing the final three games of the season for the Blackhawks with two goals and no assists, he would also add 10 goals and 15 assists for 25 points in 48 games for the Admirals.

In the 2007–08 season, Bickell would play in four contests for the Blackhawks and was held pointless while also playing in 73 games for the Rockford IceHogs with 19 goals and 20 assists for 39 points recorded along with two goals and three assists for five points in all 12 games in the 2008 Calder Cup playoffs, where the IceHogs defeated the Houston Aeros in the first round in five games before losing to the Chicago Wolves in the second round in seven games.

On December 31, 2008, Bickell suffered a broken thumb in a game against the Quad City Flames as a result of getting into a fight with Flames' forward J.D. Watt. This would cause Bickell to miss the next 29 games for the IceHogs before returning to the lineup on March 7, 2009, in a 4–3 SO loss to the Peoria Rivermen. Three weeks later on March 28, however, Bickell suffered an eye injury in a 3–2 loss to the San Antonio Rampage after getting hit in the face with a puck from a slapshot by teammate Jordan Hendry, causing him to miss five more contests before returning to the IceHogs lineup once more on April 10 in a 2–1 win over the Peoria Rivermen. He finished the injury-plagued 2008–09 season with six goals and eight assists for 14 points in 42 games. After playing four games and being held goalless with two assists for two points in the IceHogs first-round sweep against the Milwaukee Admirals in the 2009 Calder Cup playoffs, Bickell was recalled by the Blackhawks to serve as a black ace for them as they qualified for the playoffs for the first time since 2002. The Blackhawks defeated the Calgary Flames in six games in the first round of the 2009 playoffs, marking the first time since 1996 where the Blackhawks won a playoff series. The Blackhawks would go on to defeat the Vancouver Canucks in the second round in six games before being defeated in five games in the Conference Finals by the defending Stanley Cup champion Detroit Red Wings. Despite being recalled after the Blackhawks first round victory over the Flames, Bickell wouldn't play in any playoff games in the second or third rounds.

On July 8, 2009, Bickell signed a one-year extension with the Blackhawks. On December 27, Bickell recorded his first NHL assist on a goal scored by John Madden in a 5–4 win against the Nashville Predators. After playing in 16 regular season games and recorded three goals and one assist for four points for the Blackhawks along with 65 games with the IceHogs where he recorded 16 goals, 15 assists for 31 points, Bickell became a mainstay for the Blackhawks in time for the start of the 2010 Stanley Cup playoffs with no Calder Cup playoff games played for the IceHogs. For the Blackhawks in the 2010 playoffs, Bickell appeared in four postseason games with one assist, making his Stanley Cup playoff debut on April 22, 2010, in Game four of the first round against the Nashville Predators while playing on the first line with Patrick Kane and captain Jonathan Toews and recording an assist on a goal scored by Toews in that game. After defeating the Predators, Vancouver Canucks and the top-seeded San Jose Sharks in the first three rounds, Bickell and the Blackhawks eventually defeated the Philadelphia Flyers in the 2010 Stanley Cup Final in six games for the Blackhawks first Stanley Cup championship since 1961. He received a ring from the Blackhawks, was in the team picture at center ice in full gear after the sixth game and had a personal day with the Cup over the summer but his name was not inscribed on the Cup.

On July 23, 2010, Bickell signed a three-year extension to stay with the Blackhawks. In the 2010–11 season, his first full season in the NHL, Bickell had a breakout season and finished with a career-high 17 goals and 20 assists for 37 points in 78 appearances as the defending Stanley Cup champion Blackhawks narrowly qualified for the playoffs as the eighth seed in the West and while spending the bulk of the season on the teams third line with Dave Bolland and Troy Brouwer. On April 19, 2011, in Game Four of the first round of the 2011 playoffs against the Presidents' Trophy-winning Vancouver Canucks, Bickell recorded his first Stanley Cup playoff goal against Canucks goaltender Roberto Luongo. After Bickell and the defending Stanley Cup champion Blackhawks rallied back from a 3–0 series deficit to force a seventh game, it was announced on April 25, the day after Game Six and the day before Game Seven that Bickell had undergone surgery to repair two severed wrist tendons initially sustained on April 15 in Game 2 after getting accidentally cut by the skate blade of Canucks defenseman Sami Salo causing him to miss Game 7 the following day where the Blackhawks would fall in overtime 2–1 for a 4–3 defeat in the series (with Canucks forward Alexandre Burrows scoring both goals in the Canucks Game 7 victory). Bickell ended the playoffs with two goals, two assists and four points in five games.

Bickell's offensive production dropped during the 2011–12 campaign, where he only tallied nine goals and 15 assists for 24 points in 71 games while continuing to be a staple on the Hawks' third line with Dave Bolland and Michael Frolík. The Blackhawks as a team however, improved from the previous season finishing sixth in the West. He followed up by two goals and no assists for two points in all six playoff games in the Blackhawks first round exit to the Phoenix Coyotes.

After playing all 48 regular season games in the 2012–13 lockout-shortened season and recording nine goals and 14 assists for 23 points to help the Blackhawks win the Presidents' Trophy as the regular season champions, Bickell was highly productive during the 2013 playoffs. He scored nine goals and eight assists for 17 points in all 23 games during the postseason. He recorded the game-tying goal against Boston Bruins goaltender Tuukka Rask during game six of the Stanley Cup Final on June 24, 2013. Teammate Dave Bolland scored the go-ahead goal on Rask 17 seconds later to give the Blackhawks a 3–2 victory in the game and a 4–2 victory in the series to win the Stanley Cup for the second time in four seasons. Bickell's productivity throughout the playoffs made him as a potential candidate for the Conn Smythe Trophy as the playoff MVP (which was eventually awarded to teammate Patrick Kane). After the playoffs were over, Bickell revealed he had played through a torn MCL that was originally sustained in Game 5 of the Western Conference Finals on June 8 against the defending Stanley Cup champion Los Angeles Kings.

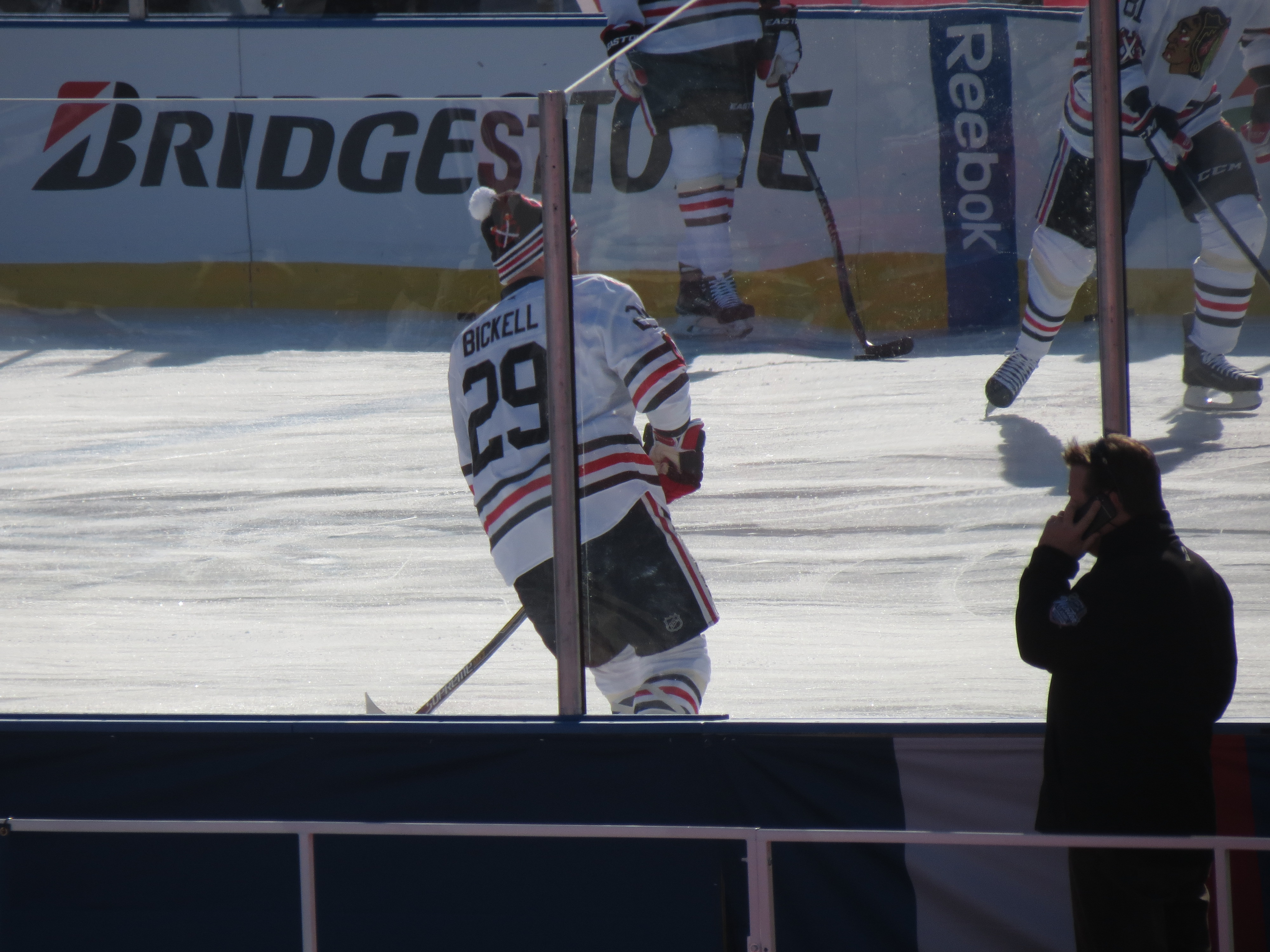
Bickell with the Blackhawks in warm-ups prior to the 2015 NHL Winter Classic

On June 30, 2013, the Blackhawks awarded Bickell's strong postseason performance with a four-year, $16 million contract that goes through until the 2016–17 season. On November 19, Bickell suffered an undisclosed lower-body injury in a 5–1 loss to the Colorado Avalanche after sliding feet first into the net. After missing 14 games, he returned to the lineup on December 17 against the Nashville Predators. Bickell then missed six more games after sustaining an undisclosed upper body injury on March 19, 2014 against the St. Louis Blues before returning to the lineup on April 3, against the Minnesota Wild. He finished the 2013–14 season playing in 59 games with 11 goals, four assists and 15 points recorded. Despite the injury-filled regular season, Bickell replicated his productivity from a year prior on another lengthy playoff run during the 2014 playoffs while playing on the first line with Jonathan Toews and Marián Hossa which saw the Blackhawks go to the Western Conference Finals against the Los Angeles Kings for the second straight year, which would see the eventual Stanley Cup champion Kings win the series in seven games, one win short from another appearance in the Stanley Cup Finals. Bickell played all 19 playoff games with seven goals, three assists and 10 points.

Bickell tallied 14 goals and 14 assists for 28 points while appearing in 80 games in the 2014–15 season. The 80 games he played in the season was a new career high in regular season games played (from the 78 played in 2010–11). However, his production declined in the postseason, where he recorded no goals and only five assists for five points in 18 games. After playing every game in the first three rounds against the Nashville Predators, Minnesota Wild and the top-seeded Anaheim Ducks, respectively, Bickell was scratched from the team's lineup for the first two games of the 2015 Stanley Cup Final against the Tampa Bay Lightning due to health-related issues. Bickell returned to the lineup on June 8, 2015 for the third game and played on the second line with Brad Richards and Patrick Kane only to be scratched again for the final three games due to health-related concerns. The Blackhawks eventually defeated the Lightning in six games, giving Bickell his third Stanley Cup (second with his name engraved on the cup) and the Blackhawks third Stanley Cup title in six seasons.

The Blackhawks unsuccessfully attempted to trade Bickell prior to the 2015–16 season to alleviate cap space. The team initially waived Bickell but reinserted him into their roster as the season started. Bickell was unable to consistently perform due to health-related issues and spent much of the season with the Rockford IceHogs of the American Hockey League. Bickell skated in 25 games for the Blackhawks and was goalless but recorded two assists and points while playing mostly on the fourth line. He also played in 47 contests for the IceHogs where he scored 15 goals and 16 assists for 31 points. Bickell would also play three playoff games for the IceHogs with an assist recorded and wouldn’t play any playoff games for the Blackhawks for the first time since 2009 as the defending Stanley Cup champion Blackhawks would lose their first round series in the 2016 playoffs in seven games to the St. Louis Blues.

==== Carolina Hurricanes and retirement (2016–2017) ====
During the 2016 off-season, Bickell's $4-million salary cap-hit posed a serious problem to the Blackhawks, who were struggling to stay below the NHL's salary cap. The team again shopped Bickell to other teams, but few teams seemed to be interested in him and his $4 million cap hit. The Blackhawks eventually traded Bickell along with Teuvo Teräväinen at the 2016 NHL entry draft to the Carolina Hurricanes in exchange for a 2016 second-round pick and a 2017 third-round pick on June 15, 2016. The Hurricanes also agreed to accept Bickell's cap hit and remaining contract. Bickell scored one goal in seven games for the Hurricanes, before experiencing health issues again. The Hurricanes announced that Bickell had been diagnosed with multiple sclerosis and placed him on injured reserve on November 11.

Bickell began practicing with the Hurricanes again on January 17, 2017. The Hurricanes assigned him to the Charlotte Checkers for a conditioning stint on February 24. Bickell returned to the Hurricanes on April 4 in a 5–3 loss against the Minnesota Wild, and skated in his first NHL game since leaving for MS treatment in mid-November. Bickell played the final game of his career on April 9, scoring the only shootout goal of his career in the Hurricanes' 4−3 win against the Philadelphia Flyers. He concluded the 2016–17 season, his only season with the Hurricanes playing in 11 games and recording one goal. He concluded his NHL career with 66 goals and 70 assists over 395 NHL games. He also tallied 20 goals and 19 assists in 75 postseason games.

The NHL honored Bickell's career on June 21, 2017, at the 2017 NHL Awards ceremony and commended him for showing perseverance while battling multiple sclerosis. On October 4, Bickell signed a ceremonial one-day contract with the Blackhawks to retire with the team. The Blackhawks honored Bickell at the United Center before their 2017–18 season opener on October 5 against the defending Stanley Cup champion Pittsburgh Penguins, which saw the Blackhawks win 10–1.

== Health issues ==
Bickell began experiencing symptoms of vertigo that forced him to miss the first two games of the 2015 Stanley Cup Final. He initially believed the ailment was caused by an infected tooth. His agent later commented that Bickell had developed vestibular issues, which hindered his performance during the 2015–16 season. In early-November 2016, shortly into the 2016–17 season, he began experiencing an unexplained pain in his shoulder and leg that caused him to miss multiple games. Doctors then diagnosed Bickell with multiple sclerosis on November 11, 2016. He commented on his health, "Since the 2015 playoffs, I've been struggling to understand what was going on with my body. Again during the past few weeks, it felt like something wasn't right." Ron Francis, the Hurricanes' general manager, stated that Bickell would take an indefinite amount of time off from hockey to receive treatment for his condition. While he ultimately returned to the Hurricanes towards the end of the 2016–17 season in April 2017, he announced he would retire from playing to focus on his MS treatment.

== Personal life ==
Bickell and his wife have two daughters. He and his wife established the Bryan & Amanda Bickell Foundation, which helps rescue abused pit bulls.

== Career statistics ==
| | | | Regular season | | | | | Playoffs |
| Season | Team | League | GP | G | A | Pts | PIM | GP | G | A | Pts | PIM |
|---|---|---|---|---|---|---|---|---|---|---|---|---|
| 2000–01 | Toronto Red Wings AAA | GTHL U15 | 65 | 78 | 62 | 140 | 20 | — | — | — | — | — |
| 2001–02 | Toronto Red Wings AAA | GTHL U15 | 65 | 31 | 41 | 72 | 76 | — | — | — | — | — |
| 2002–03 | Ottawa 67's | OHL | 50 | 7 | 10 | 17 | 4 | 20 | 5 | 3 | 8 | 12 |
| 2003–04 | Ottawa 67's | OHL | 59 | 20 | 16 | 36 | 76 | 7 | 3 | 0 | 3 | 11 |
| 2004–05 | Ottawa 67's | OHL | 66 | 22 | 32 | 54 | 95 | 21 | 5 | 12 | 17 | 32 |
| 2005–06 | Ottawa 67's | OHL | 41 | 28 | 22 | 50 | 41 | — | — | — | — | — |
| 2005–06 | Windsor Spitfires | OHL | 26 | 17 | 16 | 33 | 19 | 7 | 5 | 5 | 10 | 10 |
| 2006–07 | Norfolk Admirals | AHL | 48 | 10 | 15 | 25 | 66 | 2 | 0 | 0 | 0 | 0 |
| 2006–07 | Chicago Blackhawks | NHL | 3 | 2 | 0 | 2 | 0 | — | — | — | — | — |
| 2007–08 | Rockford IceHogs | AHL | 73 | 19 | 20 | 39 | 52 | 12 | 2 | 3 | 5 | 11 |
| 2007–08 | Chicago Blackhawks | NHL | 4 | 0 | 0 | 0 | 2 | — | — | — | — | — |
| 2008–09 | Rockford IceHogs | AHL | 42 | 6 | 8 | 14 | 60 | 4 | 0 | 2 | 2 | 4 |
| 2009–10 | Chicago Blackhawks | NHL | 16 | 3 | 1 | 4 | 5 | 4 | 0 | 1 | 1 | 2 |
| 2009–10 | Rockford IceHogs | AHL | 65 | 16 | 15 | 31 | 58 | — | — | — | — | — |
| 2010–11 | Chicago Blackhawks | NHL | 78 | 17 | 20 | 37 | 40 | 5 | 2 | 2 | 4 | 0 |
| 2011–12 | Chicago Blackhawks | NHL | 71 | 9 | 15 | 24 | 48 | 6 | 2 | 0 | 2 | 4 |
| 2012–13 | Orli Znojmo | EBEL | 28 | 9 | 18 | 27 | 14 | — | — | — | — | — |
| 2012–13 | Chicago Blackhawks | NHL | 48 | 9 | 14 | 23 | 25 | 23 | 9 | 8 | 17 | 14 |
| 2013–14 | Chicago Blackhawks | NHL | 59 | 11 | 4 | 15 | 28 | 19 | 7 | 3 | 10 | 8 |
| 2014–15 | Chicago Blackhawks | NHL | 80 | 14 | 14 | 28 | 38 | 18 | 0 | 5 | 5 | 14 |
| 2015–16 | Chicago Blackhawks | NHL | 25 | 0 | 2 | 2 | 2 | — | — | — | — | — |
| 2015–16 | Rockford IceHogs | AHL | 47 | 15 | 16 | 31 | 23 | 3 | 0 | 1 | 1 | 2 |
| 2016–17 | Carolina Hurricanes | NHL | 11 | 1 | 0 | 1 | 4 | — | — | — | — | — |
| 2016–17 | Charlotte Checkers | AHL | 10 | 1 | 3 | 4 | 4 | — | — | — | — | — |
| NHL totals | | | 395 | 66 | 70 | 136 | 192 | 75 | 20 | 19 | 39 | 42 |

== Awards and honours ==
| Awards | Year |
NHL
| Stanley Cup champion | 2013, 2015 |
