= Teuvo Teräväinen =

Finnish ice hockey player (born 1994)

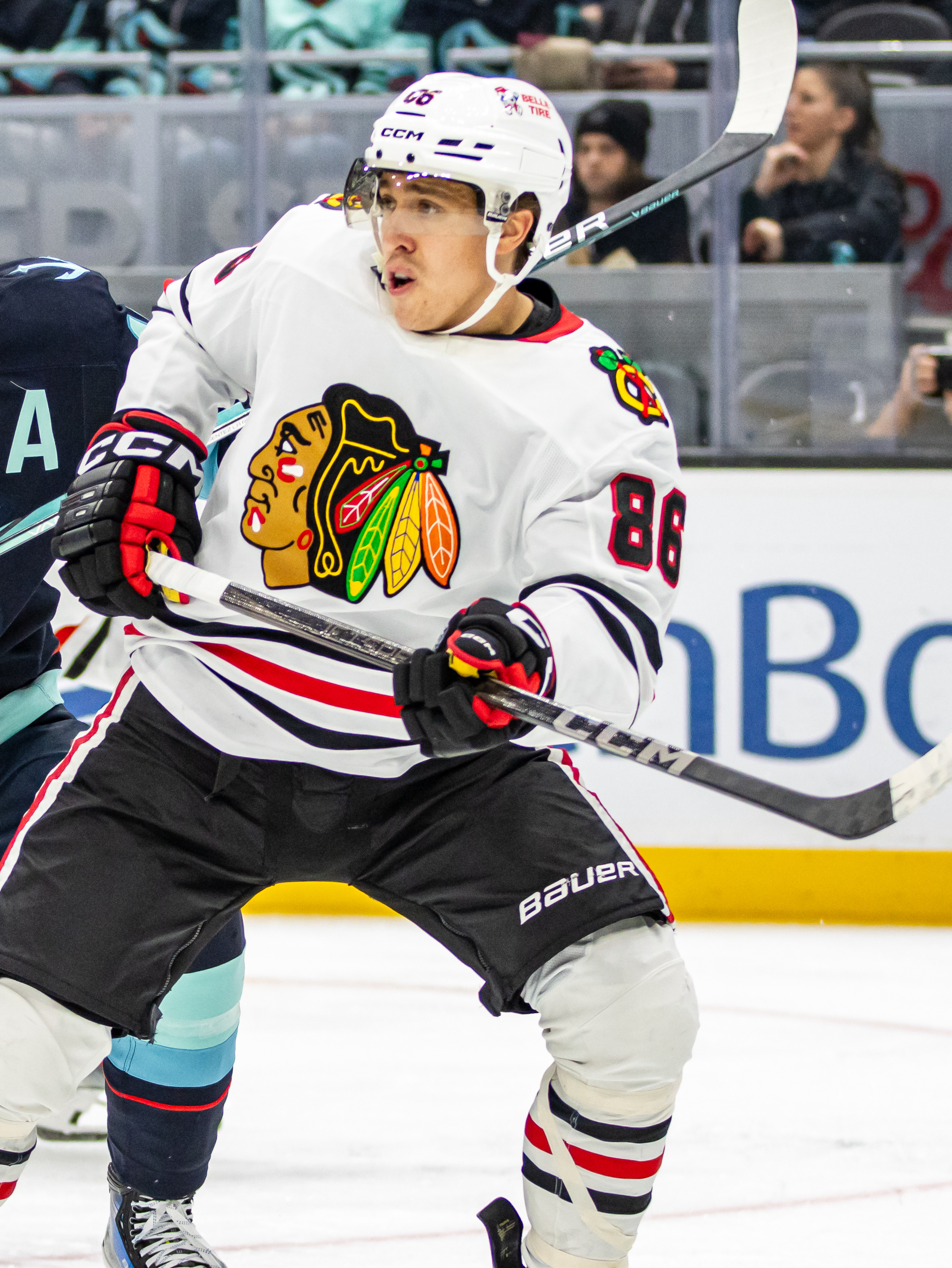
- Teräväinen playing for the Chicago Blackhawks in November 2024
- Born: 11 September 1994 (age 32) Helsinki, Finland
- Height: 5 ft 11 in (180 cm)
- Weight: 191 lb (87 kg; 13 st 9 lb)
- Position: Forward
- Shoots: Left
- NHL team Former teams: Chicago Blackhawks; Jokerit; Carolina Hurricanes
- National team: Finland
- NHL draft: 18th overall, 2012; Chicago Blackhawks
- Playing career: 2011–present

Teuvo Henri Matias Teräväinen (Finnish pronunciation: [ˈteu̯ʋo ˈteræʋæi̯nen] TAY-vo; born 11 September 1994) is a Finnish professional ice hockey player who is a forward for the Chicago Blackhawks of the National Hockey League (NHL). He was selected in the first round, 18th overall, of the 2012 NHL entry draft by the Blackhawks after playing several seasons with the Jokerit organization in Finland. Also being drafted by the Kontinental Hockey League (KHL)'s Lokomotiv Yaroslavl in the 2011 KHL Junior Draft, he is known for his offensive abilities and play-making skills. In 2015, Teräväinen won a Stanley Cup as a member of the Blackhawks.

In 2016, Teräväinen was traded to the Carolina Hurricanes, with whom his offense blossomed. He played his next eight seasons in Carolina, helping the team return to contention in 2019 after a ten-year playoff drought. In 2024, he returned to Chicago as a free agent.

== Playing career ==
=== Jokerit ===
A product of Jokerit's youth system, Teräväinen made his SM-liiga debut on 18 October 2011 at age 17. He quickly established his place in the first team and played 40 games en route to winning the Jarmo Wasama memorial trophy for rookie of the year. During the season, he then entered the 2012 NHL entry draft and was ranked as the second best skater out of Europe by the NHL Central Scouting Bureau. He was ultimately selected in the first round, 18th overall, by the Chicago Blackhawks.

In his second season in the SM-liiga, Teräväinen played 44 games and scored 31 points. In the following August, he signed a three-year, entry-level contract with the Blackhawks. Teräväinen subsequently participated in Blackhawks' training camp, but returned to Jokerit for the 2013–14 season.

After Jokerit star centre Ilari Filppula moved to CSKA Moscow of the KHL, Teräväinen was promoted to become the team's new top-line centerman. However, he started the season relatively slowly, scoring just two points in his first nine games. However, Teräväinen eventually picked up his game and after a successful tournament at the World Junior Championships, went on a 13-game point streak, scoring 5 goals and 18 assists. He ended the season with 44 points in 49 games. He was named team captain of Jokerit when their captain went down with injury.

=== Chicago Blackhawks ===
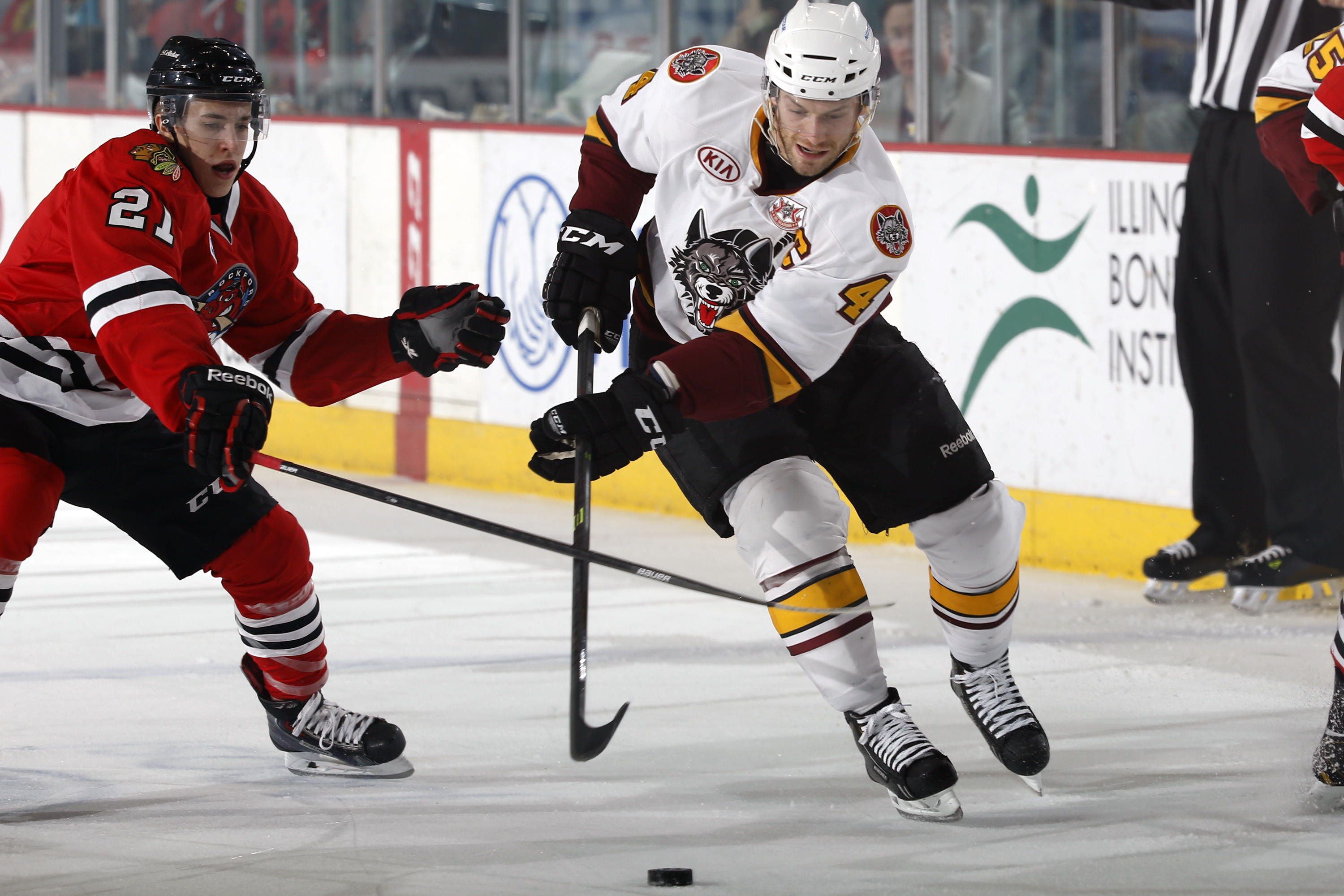
Teräväinen (left) chasing Taylor Chorney of the Chicago Wolves for the puck during an April 2014 AHL game with the Rockford IceHogs

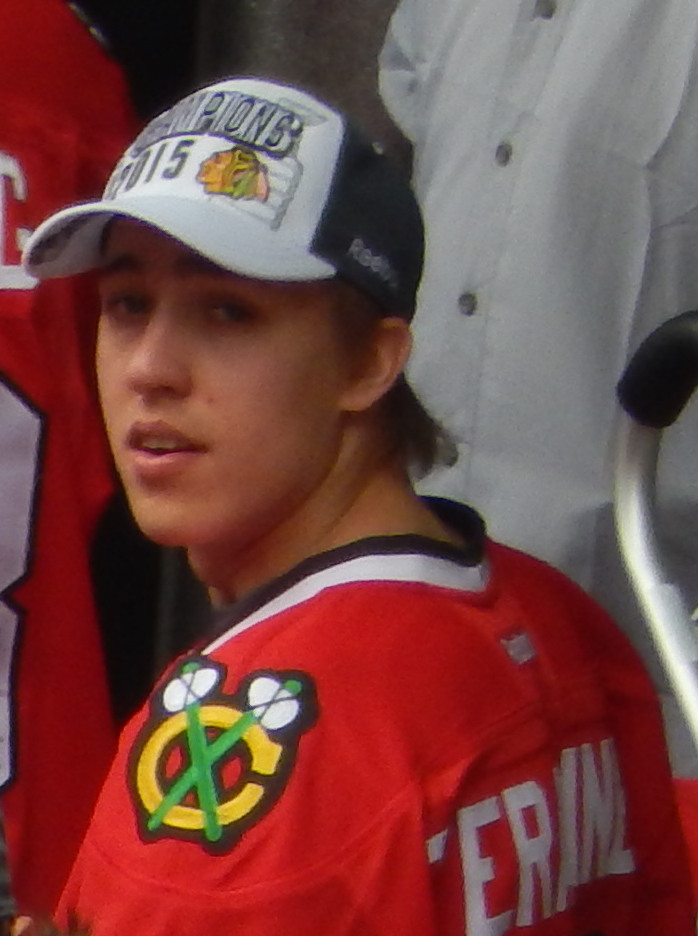
Teräväinen at the Blackhawks' 2015 victory rally

Teräväinen made his debut for the Blackhawks on 25 March 2014 in a 4–2 win over the Dallas Stars.

Teräväinen played portions of both the 2013–14 and 2014–15 seasons with Chicago's AHL affiliate, the Rockford IceHogs.

Teräväinen scored his first career NHL goal on 16 January 2015 against the Winnipeg Jets. During game one of the 2015 Stanley Cup Final, Teräväinen scored the tying goal on Ben Bishop before stripping the puck from the Tampa Bay Lightning's J. T. Brown late in the third period, setting up the eventual game-winning goal scored by Antoine Vermette. He became the fourth-youngest player to ever score a goal in the Stanley Cup Final (at 20 years, 265 days) and the second-youngest to have a multi-point game in the Cup Final since 1990. He won the Stanley Cup in 2015 with the Blackhawks in his rookie season, scoring ten points in 18 playoff games in the run.

=== Carolina Hurricanes ===
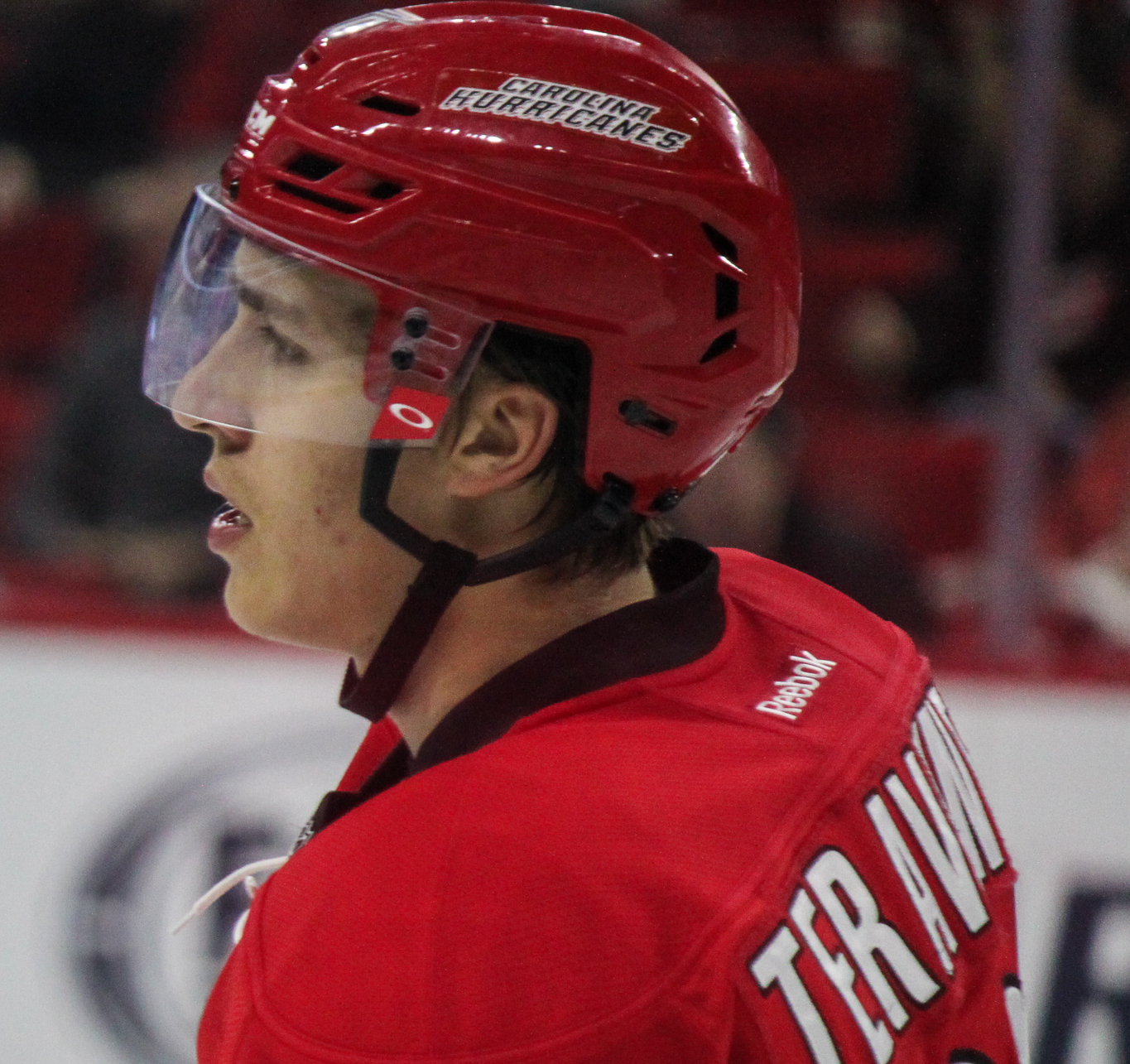
Teräväinen with the Carolina Hurricanes in February 2017

On 15 June 2016, Teräväinen was traded to the Carolina Hurricanes (along with Bryan Bickell) in exchange for the New York Rangers' 2016 second-round draft pick (50th, acquired in the Eric Staal trade) and Chicago's own 2017 third-round pick. Following the trade, Hurricanes general manager Ron Francis spoke highly of him, saying: "his game improved this year on both sides of the puck...he has good hockey sense and skating ability. We've been a team that struggles to score goals. I think he will help us in 5-on-5 play and on the power play." In his first season with the Hurricanes, Teräväinen established career highs in games played, goals, assists, and points resulting in him signing a contract extension worth $2.86 million per season on 15 June 2017.

In the first year of his new contract, Teräväinen continued to produce offensively and surpassed his previous career-highs in goals, assists, and points. Teräväinen began the season playing on the Hurricanes top line alongside Jordan Staal and Sebastian Aho. Early in the season, Teräväinen scored his first natural hat-trick as a Hurricane on 13 November 2017 in a 5–1 win over the Dallas Stars. He recorded three straight goals within seven minutes and five seconds of each other, becoming the first Hurricane to record a natural hat trick since Eric Staal in 2010. As a result of the hat-trick, Teräväinen totaled 10 points in four games and was named NHL's First Star of the Week for the week of November 12 to 19. He ended the season with 23 goals and 41 assists for 64 points through 82 games as the Hurricanes failed to qualify for the 2018 Stanley Cup playoffs.

On 21 January 2019, Teräväinen signed a 5-year, $27 million contract extension with the Hurricanes, carrying an annual cap hit of $5.4 million. As the Hurricanes qualified for the 2019 Stanley Cup playoffs, he helped them reach the NHL Conference Final after a series victories over the defending Stanley Cup champion Washington Capitals and the New York Islanders. Following their elimination to the Boston Bruins, Teräväinen ended the tournament leading the team with seven goals while his teammate Aho led the Hurricanes with 12 points.

After recording career highs in points and assists in 2018–19, Teravainen returned to the team in 2019–20 for his fourth consecutive season with the team. Prior to the season being shut down three weeks early due to the COVID-19 pandemic, he led the Hurricanes with 48 assists. He helped lead the Hurricanes to the 2020 Stanley Cup playoffs, where they were eliminated by the Bruins in the first round.

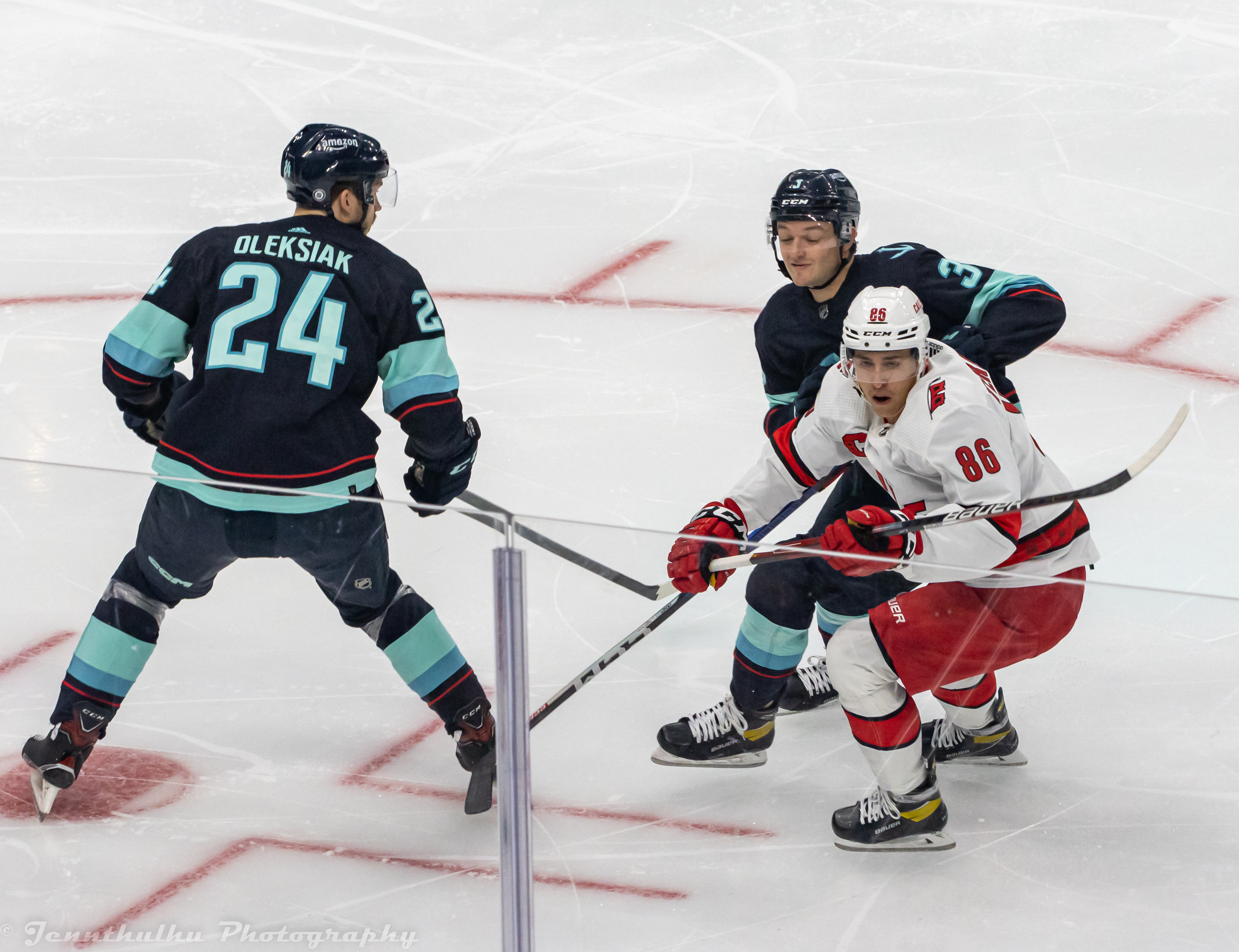
Teräväinen (right) making a play against Will Borgen of the Seattle Kraken in October 2022.

Teräväinen missed the beginning of the 2020–21 season after being placed on NHL COVID-19 protocol on 19 January 2021. He eventually came of the protocol list on 29 January and joined the team for their game against the Chicago Blackhawks on 2 February. However, a few games later, Teräväinen was diagnosed with a concussion as a result of a hit from Blackhawks defenceman Nikita Zadorov. He returned to the Hurricanes lineup in early March but, after playing for 14 minutes, experienced concussion-like symptoms. Teräväinen returned to the lineup for the remainder of the season on 27 April for a game against the Dallas Stars. He helped lead the Hurricanes to the 2021 Stanley Cup playoffs, where they were eliminated by the Tampa Bay Lightning in the second round.

During the 2022–23 season Teräväinen appeared in 68 games during the regular season, recording 12 goals and 25 assists for 37 points, while the Hurricanes qualified for the 2023 Stanley Cup playoffs. Teräväinen broke his hand in game two of the Hurricanes' first round series against the Islanders. Teräväinen underwent surgery on the hand and was able to return for game one of the Eastern Conference Final against the Florida Panthers.

=== Return to Chicago ===
On July 1, 2024, Teräväinen signed a three-year, $16.2 million contract to return to the Blackhawks, carrying an average annual value of $5.4 million.

== International play ==
Medal record

Representing Finland

Ice hockey

Olympic Games
Bronze medal – third place	2026 Milano Cortina	

World Championships
Gold medal – first place	2026 Switzerland	

World Junior Championships
Gold medal – first place	2014 Malmö	

Teräväinen has represented Finland on several youth levels, most notably in the World Junior Championships. In the 2013 tournament, he scored 11 points, placing fourth in the tournament scoring. In the following year, he was named the captain of the team, leading Finland all the way to the final. In the final, Finland defeated Sweden 3–2 in overtime. Teräväinen assisted all three of Finland's goals and was the overall scoring leader of the tournament.

After the Carolina Hurricanes failed to make the 2018 playoffs, Teräväinen was named to the Finnish roster to compete at the 2018 IIHF World Championship.

He represented Finland at the 2026 Winter Olympics and won a bronze medal.

== Personal life ==
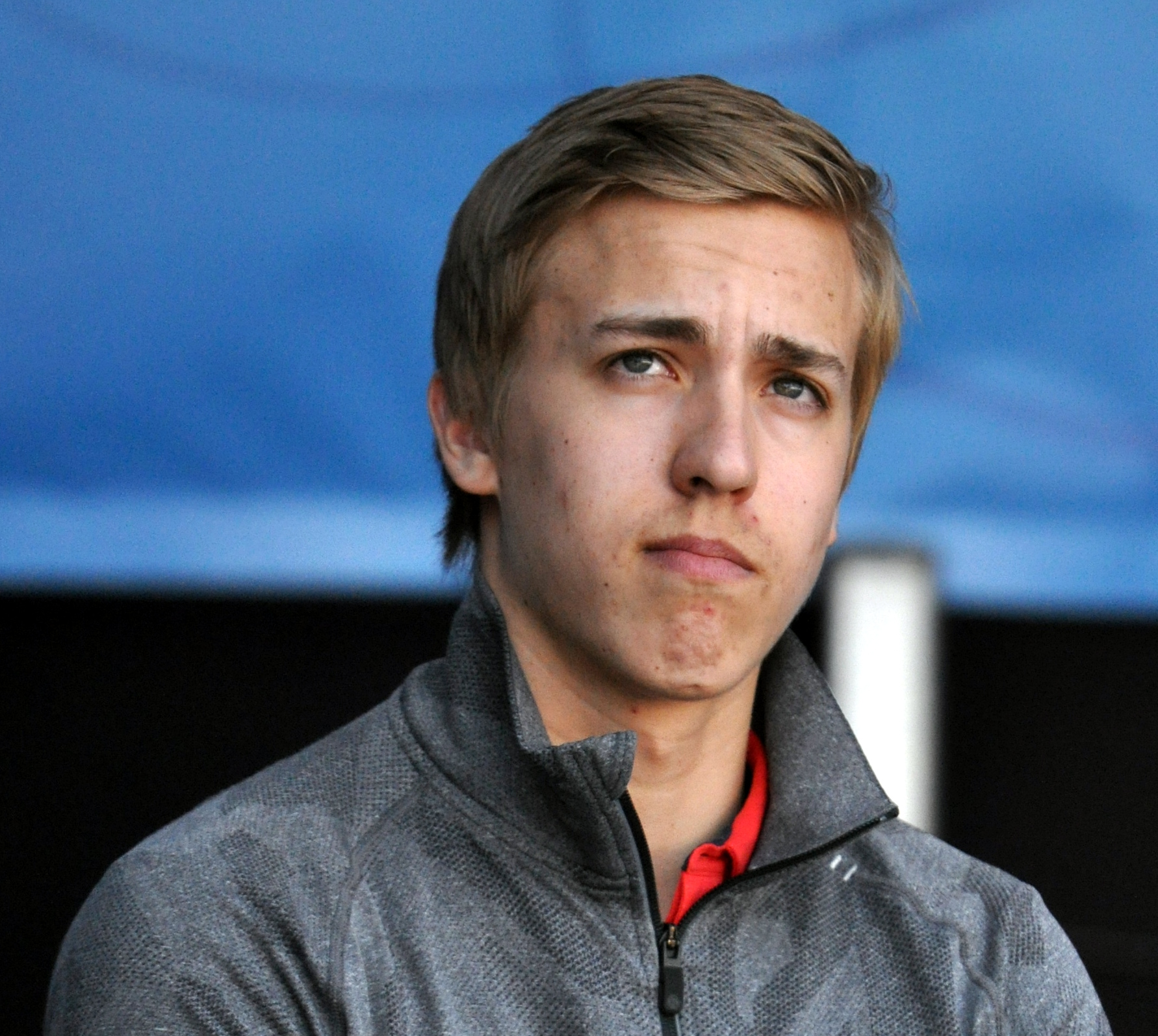
Teuvo Teräväinen in 2013

Teräväinen has a younger brother and sister. His father is a dentist. His brother Eero is a defenceman with KooKoo of the Liiga and previously played with HIFK of the Liiga and with the Finland men's national under-18 ice hockey team at the 2017 IIHF World U18 Championships. His sister, Satu, appeared at the 2019 IIHF Women's World U18 Championship with the Finnish women's national under-18 ice hockey team and played with Kiekko-Espoo of the Naisten Liiga, most recently during the 2019–20 season.

== Career statistics ==
=== Regular season and playoffs ===
			Regular season					Playoffs
Season	Team	League	GP	G	A	Pts	PIM	GP	G	A	Pts	PIM
2009–10	Jokerit	FIN U18	22	15	11	26	4	4	0	4	4	0
2010–11	Jokerit	FIN U18	4	1	3	4	2	1	0	1	1	25
2010–11	Jokerit	FIN U20	26	3	17	20	8	8	1	4	5	4
2011–12	Jokerit	FIN U20	11	12	8	20	4	2	1	1	2	0
2011–12	Jokerit	SM-l	40	11	7	18	6	9	2	4	6	0
2011–12	Kiekko-Vantaa	Mestis	3	1	2	3	0	—	—	—	—	—
2012–13	Jokerit	SM-l	44	13	18	31	6	6	1	1	2	0
2012–13	Kiekko-Vantaa	Mestis	1	0	1	1	0	—	—	—	—	—
2013–14	Jokerit	Liiga	49	9	35	44	12	2	0	0	0	0
2013–14	Chicago Blackhawks	NHL	3	0	0	0	0	—	—	—	—	—
2013–14	Rockford IceHogs	AHL	5	2	0	2	2	—	—	—	—	—
2014–15	Rockford IceHogs	AHL	39	6	19	25	6	—	—	—	—	—
2014–15	Chicago Blackhawks	NHL	34	4	5	9	2	18	4	6	10	0
2015–16	Chicago Blackhawks	NHL	78	13	22	35	20	7	0	1	1	0
2016–17	Carolina Hurricanes	NHL	81	15	27	42	16	—	—	—	—	—
2017–18	Carolina Hurricanes	NHL	82	23	41	64	14	—	—	—	—	—
2018–19	Carolina Hurricanes	NHL	82	21	55	76	12	15	7	3	10	2
2019–20	Carolina Hurricanes	NHL	68	15	48	63	8	8	3	2	5	4
2020–21	Carolina Hurricanes	NHL	21	5	10	15	4	11	2	4	6	12
2021–22	Carolina Hurricanes	NHL	77	22	43	65	24	14	4	7	11	2
2022–23	Carolina Hurricanes	NHL	68	12	25	37	16	6	1	0	1	2
2023–24	Carolina Hurricanes	NHL	76	25	28	53	10	11	2	4	6	0
2024–25	Chicago Blackhawks	NHL	82	15	43	58	12	—	—	—	—	—
2025–26	Chicago Blackhawks	NHL	75	14	21	35	6	—	—	—	—	—
Liiga totals			133	33	60	93	24	17	3	5	8	0
NHL totals			827	184	368	552	144	90	23	27	50	22

=== International ===
Year	Team	Event	Result	GP	G	A	Pts	PIM
2011	Finland	U17	7th	5	2	5	7	2
2011	Finland	U18	5th	6	0	0	0	4
2011	Finland	IH18	4th	5	4	6	10	4
2012	Finland	U18	4th	6	2	6	8	2
2013	Finland	WJC	7th	6	5	6	11	2
2014	Finland	WJC	1st place, gold medalist(s)	7	2	13	15	2
2016	Finland	WCH	8th	2	0	0	0	0
2018	Finland	WC	5th	8	5	9	14	8
2025	Finland	4NF	4th	2	0	0	0	0
2025	Finland	WC	7th	7	1	10	11	0
2026	Finland	OG	3rd place, bronze medalist(s)	6	0	1	1	0
2026	Finland	WC	1st place, gold medalist(s)	1	0	2	2	0
Junior totals				35	15	36	51	16
Senior totals				26	6	22	28	8

== Awards and honors ==
=== Professional ===
Awards	Year	Ref
NHL
Stanley Cup champion	2015	
International
WJC All-Decade Team	2019	

Awards and achievements
Preceded by Phillip Danault	Chicago Blackhawks first-round draft pick 2012	Succeeded by Ryan Hartman
