= Jason Garrison =

Canadian ice hockey player (born 1984)

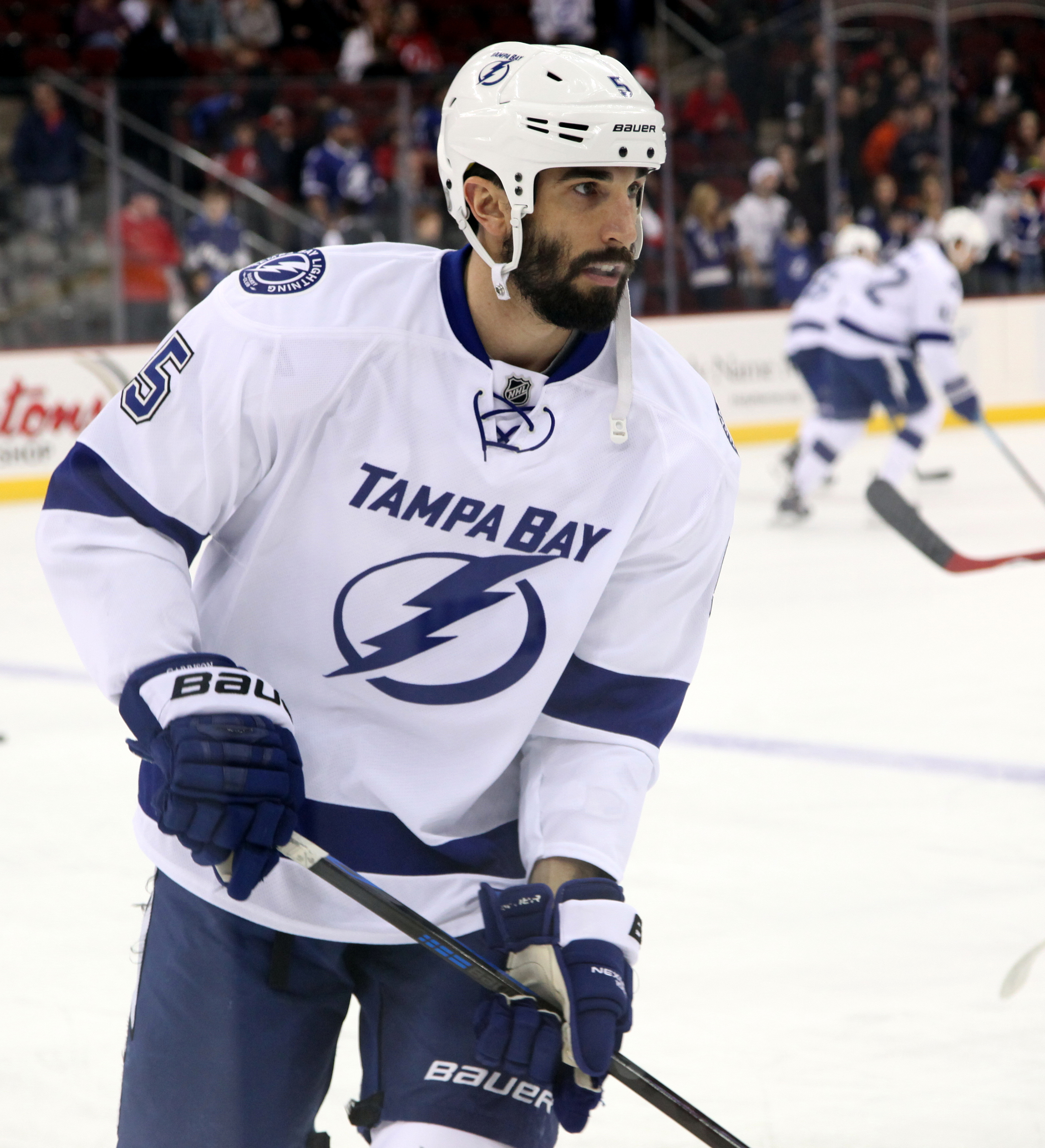
- Garrison with the Tampa Bay Lightning in December 2014
- Born: November 13, 1984 (age 41) White Rock, British Columbia, Canada
- Height: 6 ft 2 in (188 cm)
- Weight: 223 lb (101 kg; 15 st 13 lb)
- Position: Defence
- Shot: Left
- Played for: Florida Panthers; Vancouver Canucks; Tampa Bay Lightning; Vegas Golden Knights; Edmonton Oilers; Djurgårdens IF
- National team: Canada
- NHL draft: Undrafted
- Playing career: 2008–2023

Jason John Maxwell Garrison (born November 13, 1984) is a Canadian former professional ice hockey defenseman. Garrison played two years of Junior A with the Nanaimo Clippers of the British Columbia Hockey League (BCHL), during which time he earned a scholarship to play college hockey with the University of Minnesota Duluth. Following his third NCAA year, he signed with the Florida Panthers of the National Hockey League (NHL) as an undrafted free agent in 2008. Garrison spent four years with the Panthers organization, setting franchise records for single-season goals and power play goals by a defenceman in 2011–12.

== Playing career ==
=== Junior and college ===
Garrison did not make the transition from minor to junior hockey until age 19. He did not play in the top tier of junior hockey in the Western Hockey League (WHL) and instead joined the Nanaimo Clippers of the British Columbia Hockey League (BCHL), where he played at the Junior A level for two years. Appearing in 52 regular season games in 2003–04, he recorded 7 goals and 27 assists as a rookie. A forward in his minor hockey years, Garrison switched to defence in his first junior year. Garrison went on to add 3 goals and 13 points over 24 playoff games as the Clippers won the Fred Page Cup as BCHL champions and the Doyle Cup as Western Canada regional champions. Competing for the national title at the 2004 Royal Bank Cup, the Clippers finished last out of five teams. Garrison had three assists in four tournament contests. The following season, he improved to 22 goals and 62 points over 57 games, ranking second in team scoring. The Clippers finished first in BCHL regular season play, but were eliminated in the Fred Page Cup Semi-finals.

Earning an athletic scholarship, Garrison went on to play NCAA hockey with the University of Minnesota Duluth of the Western Collegiate Hockey Association (WCHA). In his freshman year, he scored 3 goals and 12 assists over 40 games in 2005–06. In the following two seasons, Garrison struggled with injuries and recorded 3 points over 21 games and 14 points over 26 games in 2006–07 and 2007–08, respectively.

=== Professional ===
==== Florida Panthers (2008–2012) ====
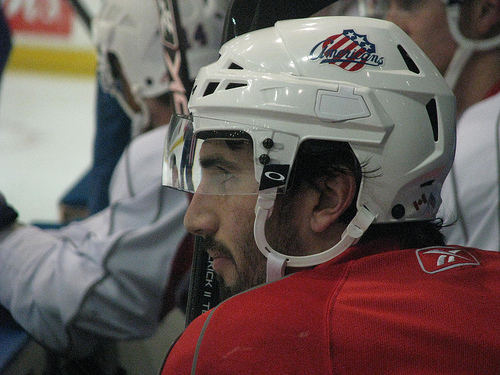
Garrison in May 2010 during his time with the Rochester Americans

Garrison opted to forgo his senior year of college after being offered an NHL contract with the Florida Panthers. He signed a two-year, entry-level contract with the team on April 2, 2008. Turning professional in 2008–09, he was assigned to the Panthers' American Hockey League (AHL) affiliate, the Rochester Americans. Within a month, he was recalled by the Panthers and appeared in his first NHL game against the St. Louis Blues on October 25, 2008. It was the only NHL game he appeared in that season, as he was quickly returned to the minors. In the AHL, he scored 8 goals and 35 points in 75 games, ranking fourth among rookie defencemen in AHL scoring.

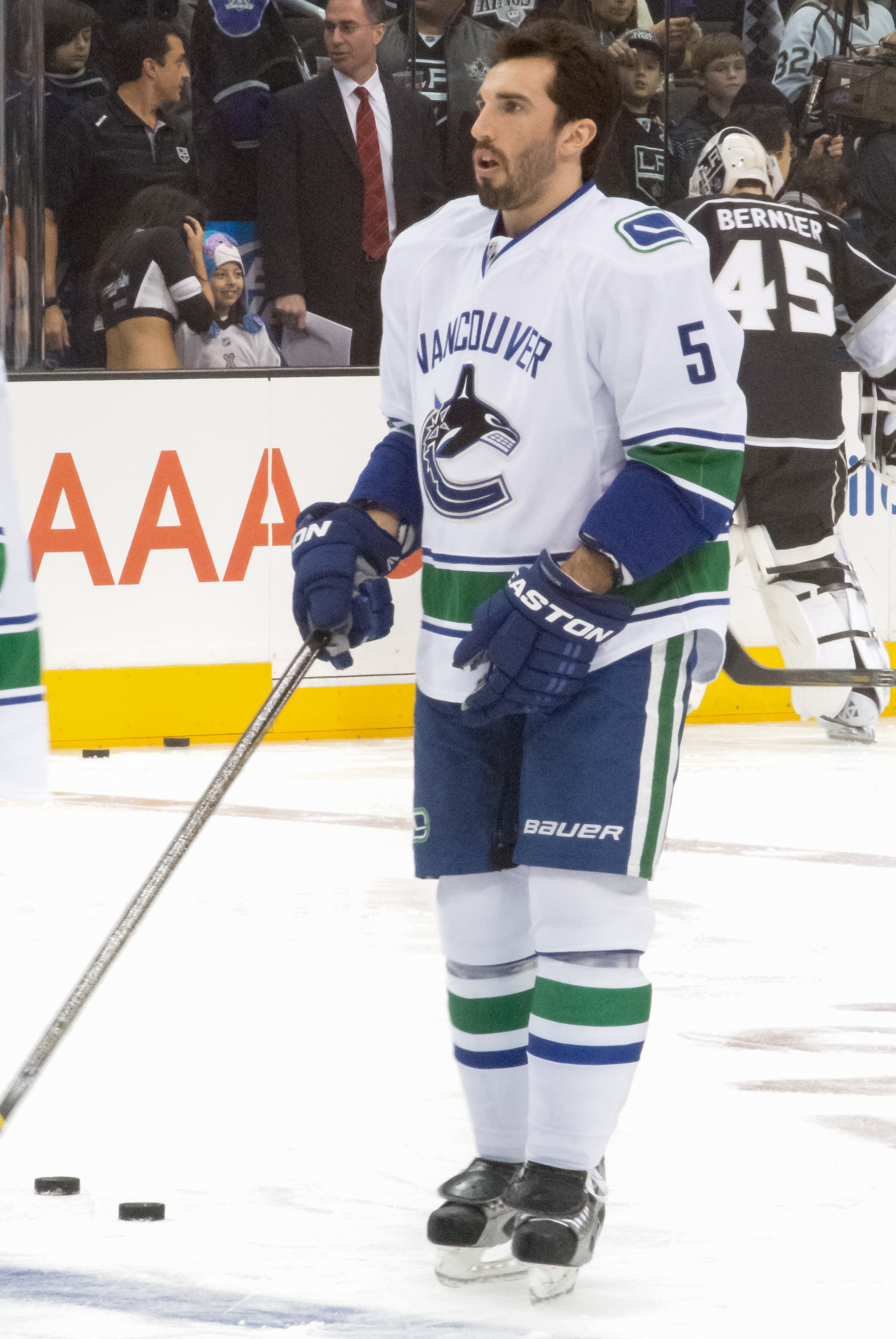
Garrison with the Vancouver Canucks in January 2013

Garrison split the season in 2009–10 between the Panthers and the Americans, scoring his first NHL goal in a 7–4 victory over the Philadelphia Flyers on March 3, 2010. Playing in 39 NHL games, he scored two goals and eight points, while also recording 3 goals and 19 points in 38 AHL contests. Forming a shutdown pairing with Mike Weaver, Garrison played his first full season with the Panthers in 2010–11. Appearing in 73 games, he totalled 5 goals and 18 points. With a –2 plus-minus rating while playing on the worst team in the Eastern Conference, Garrison was ranked by James Mirtle of The Globe and Mail as the NHL's second-best defensive defenceman.

Playing in his fourth season with the Panthers organization, Garrison was instrumental in the team's newfound success in 2011–12, playing in a more offensive role on a pairing with Brian Campbell. On March 23, 2012, Garrison set a Panthers franchise record for most goals by a defenceman in a single season with his 16th goal in a game against the Edmonton Oilers. He surpassed the previous mark of 15 set by Jay Bouwmeester (2007–08 and 2008–09) and Bryan McCabe (2008–09). His nine powerplay goals also tied the team record held by Bouwmeester (2008–09) and Gord Murphy (1993–94). Adding 17 assists, Garrison finished with 33 points in 77 games, helping the Panthers finish as the third seed in the Eastern Conference to reach the Stanley Cup playoffs for the first time since 2000. Playing the sixth seeded New Jersey Devils in the first round, they were eliminated in seven games. Garrison recorded a goal and two assists in four playoff games before sustaining a pair of lower-body injuries that sidelined him for the remainder of the series.

==== Vancouver Canucks (2012–2014) ====
Becoming an unrestricted free agent in the off-season, Garrison signed a six-year, $27.6 million contract with the Vancouver Canucks on July 1, 2012. His $4.6 million cap hit constituted a nearly sevenfold increase of his previous season's $675,000 salary. In the months ahead of his free agency, Garrison went on record as being interested in playing for the Canucks, his hometown team. Due to the 2012–13 NHL lockout, Garrison's debut with his new team was delayed until February 2013. Upon the commencement of NHL play, his struggles to adjust with his new team were well-publicized, as he was taken off the powerplay unit and separated from his intended defensive partner, Alexander Edler, within the first month. He would find success with Dan Hamhuis later in the season, however, reprising his role as a defensive defenseman with a booming shot.

==== Tampa Bay Lightning (2014–2017) ====
On June 27, 2014, Garrison was traded to the Tampa Bay Lightning (along with the rights to Jeff Costello and a seventh-round draft pick in the 2015 NHL entry draft) in exchange for a second-round pick in the 2014 NHL entry draft. The pick was traded by Vancouver for forward Linden Vey.

On October 31, 2015, Garrison skated in his 400th career NHL game, a 1–3 loss to the visiting Boston Bruins.

On January 8, 2017, Garrison played in his 500th career NHL game.

==== Vegas Golden Knights (2017–2018) ====
On June 21, 2017, Garrison was selected by the Vegas Golden Knights in the 2017 NHL Expansion Draft. The Knights received the rights to Nikita Gusev, a second-round pick in the 2017 NHL entry draft and a fourth-round pick in the 2018 NHL entry draft for selecting Garrison from the Lightning. On October 27, Garrison was placed on waivers by the Golden Knights, and was then sent to the Golden Knights' AHL affiliate, the Chicago Wolves, on October 28.

==== Edmonton Oilers (2018) ====
On August 28, 2018, Garrison signed a professional tryout (PTO) contract with the Edmonton Oilers, and on October 2, signed a one-year contract with the Oilers to begin the 2018–19 season. Initially starting as a healthy scratch, Garrison drew into the lineup for the Oilers appearing in 17 games for 1 goal before on December 30, 2018, Garrison was included in a trade by the Oilers (along with Drake Caggiula) to the Chicago Blackhawks in exchange for Brandon Manning and Robin Norell. The following day, Garrison was placed on waivers by the Blackhawks and upon clearing was assigned to join their AHL affiliate, the Rockford IceHogs, on January 1, 2019. After failing to report to the IceHogs, Garrison was placed on unconditional waivers by the Blackhawks in order to mutually terminate his contract on January 2, 2019.

==== Djurgårdens IF (2019–2020) ====
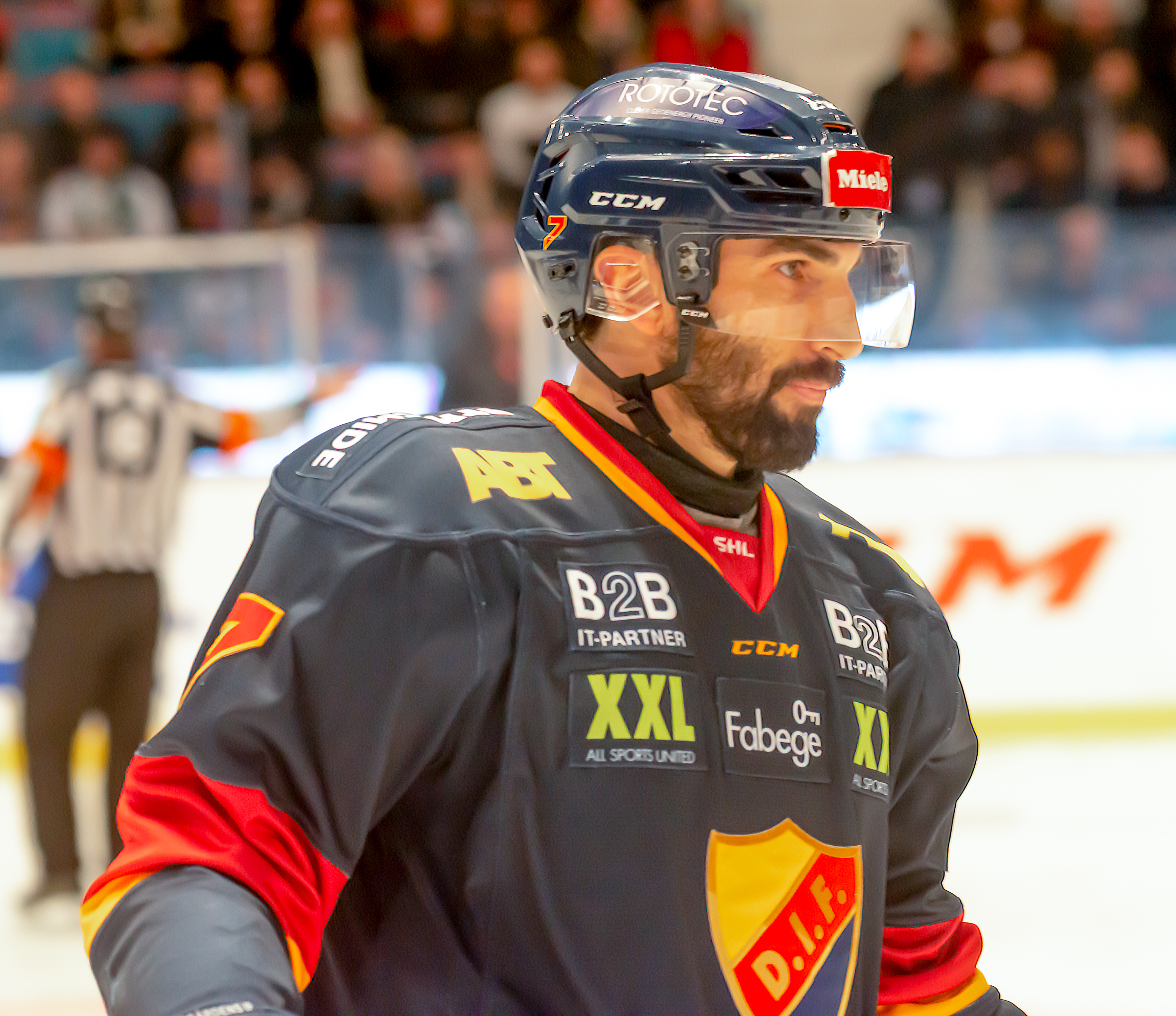
Garrison with Djurgårdens IF in January 2019

Following his release from his contract with the Blackhawks, as a free agent, Garrison opted to pursue a career abroad, promptly signing his first contract abroad in agreeing to play for the remainder of the 2018–19 season in the Swedish Hockey League (SHL) with Djurgårdens IF on January 7, 2019. Garrison played 20 games during the last half of the regular season, and scored 4 goals and 10 points. Garrison and Djurgården went on to a successful SHL playoff and eventually reached the finals against Frölunda HC, where the team lost 2–4 in games. Garrison played a total of 19 playoff games and scored 6 points. He extended his contract with Djurgården in May 2019 for another season, allowing him to play in the 2019–20 SHL season, but was unable to join the team until the middle of November due to tax regulations.

==== Return to North America ====
Opting to continue his career, Garrison returned to the Tampa Bay Lightning organization in attending training camp on a tryout basis for the 2021–22 season. Cut from his tryout, Garrison made 9 appearances with affiliate, the Syracuse Crunch in the AHL, before opting to end his tenure with the team.

Garrison returned to the professional ranks in the following 2021–22 season, joining the Chicago Wolves of the AHL on a professional try-out contract and remained on the roster to open the season. Garrison made just 3 appearances with the Wolves in the 2022–23 season before he was later released from his contract on January 29, 2023.

== Personal life ==
Garrison was born and raised in White Rock, British Columbia, where he attended Chantrell Creek Elementary and Elgin Park Secondary School. He played minor hockey in nearby Semiahmoo Bay, as well as Burnaby and Langley. Growing up, he also played rugby, volleyball and was an avid snowboarder. Moving away from home to play junior hockey in 2003, he lived in Nanaimo, British Columbia, for two years before attending the University of Minnesota Duluth on an athletic scholarship to play for the ice hockey team. During his NHL career with the Florida Panthers, he lived in Fort Lauderdale while returning to a home in Downtown Vancouver in the off-seasons.

== Career statistics ==
=== Regular season and playoffs ===
			Regular season					Playoffs
Season	Team	League	GP	G	A	Pts	PIM	GP	G	A	Pts	PIM
2002–03	Richmond Sockeyes	PIJHL
2003–04	Nanaimo Clippers	BCHL	52	7	20	27	31	24	3	10	13	12
2004–05	Nanaimo Clippers	BCHL	57	22	40	62	42	—	—	—	—	—
2005–06	University of Minnesota Duluth	WCHA	40	3	9	12	26	—	—	—	—	—
2006–07	University of Minnesota Duluth	WCHA	21	1	2	3	16	—	—	—	—	—
2007–08	University of Minnesota Duluth	WCHA	26	5	9	14	26	—	—	—	—	—
2008–09	Rochester Americans	AHL	75	8	27	35	68	—	—	—	—	—
2008–09	Florida Panthers	NHL	1	0	0	0	0	—	—	—	—	—
2009–10	Rochester Americans	AHL	38	3	16	19	33	7	2	7	9	0
2009–10	Florida Panthers	NHL	39	2	6	8	23	—	—	—	—	—
2010–11	Florida Panthers	NHL	73	5	13	18	26	—	—	—	—	—
2011–12	Florida Panthers	NHL	77	16	17	33	32	4	1	2	3	0
2012–13	Vancouver Canucks	NHL	47	8	8	16	28	4	0	0	0	2
2013–14	Vancouver Canucks	NHL	81	7	26	33	57	—	—	—	—	—
2014–15	Tampa Bay Lightning	NHL	70	4	26	30	19	23	2	5	7	8
2015–16	Tampa Bay Lightning	NHL	72	5	6	11	18	17	1	6	7	12
2016–17	Tampa Bay Lightning	NHL	70	1	8	9	14	—	—	—	—	—
2017–18	Vegas Golden Knights	NHL	8	0	1	1	4	—	—	—	—	—
2017–18	Chicago Wolves	AHL	58	8	20	28	26	3	0	2	2	0
2018–19	Edmonton Oilers	NHL	17	1	0	1	8	—	—	—	—	—
2018–19	Djurgårdens IF	SHL	20	4	6	10	4	19	0	6	6	10
2019–20	Djurgårdens IF	SHL	29	0	1	1	6	—	—	—	—	—
2021–22	Syracuse Crunch	AHL	9	0	0	0	2	—	—	—	—	—
2022–23	Chicago Wolves	AHL	3	0	1	1	0	—	—	—	—	—
NHL totals			555	49	111	160	229	48	4	13	17	22

=== International ===
Year	Team	Event	Result	GP	G	A	Pts	PIM
2014	Canada	WC	5th	7	0	4	4	6
Senior totals				7	0	4	4	6
