= 2014–15 Chicago Blackhawks season =

National Hockey League team season

2014–15 Chicago Blackhawks
- Stanley Cup champions
- Western Conference champions
- Division: 3rd Central
- Conference: 4th Western
- 2014–15 record: 48–28–6
- Home record: 24–12–5
- Road record: 24–16–1
- Goals for: 229
- Goals against: 189

Team information
- General manager: Stan Bowman
- Coach: Joel Quenneville
- Captain: Jonathan Toews
- Alternate captains: Duncan Keith; Patrick Sharp
- Arena: United Center
- Average attendance: 21,769 (110.4%); Total: 892,532
- Minor league affiliates: Rockford IceHogs (AHL); Indy Fuel (ECHL)

Team leaders
- Goals: Jonathan Toews (28)
- Assists: Marian Hossa (39)
- Points: Jonathan Toews (66)
- Penalty minutes: Andrew Shaw (68)
- Plus/minus: Jonathan Toews (+30)
- Wins: Corey Crawford (32)
- Goals against average: Antti Raanta (1.89)

The 2014–15 Chicago Blackhawks season was the 89th season for the National Hockey League (NHL) franchise that was established on September 25, 1926. The Blackhawks finished the season with a 48–28–6 record, finishing in third place in the Central Division. They defeated the Nashville Predators in the first round of the Stanley Cup playoffs, four games to two. In the next round, they swept the Minnesota Wild in four games. In the Western Conference Finals, the 'Hawks outlasted the Anaheim Ducks, winning the series four games to three. In the Stanley Cup Final, they faced the Tampa Bay Lightning. On June 15, 2015, the team won the Stanley Cup, defeating the Lightning four games to two and winning the Cup at home for the first time since 1938. This was the Blackhawks' third Cup championship in six seasons. Duncan Keith received the Conn Smythe trophy as MVP of the playoffs.

On December 21, 2014, the Blackhawks debuted a special decal in remembrance of the passing of assistant equipment manager Clinton "Clint" Reif who died during the season, the Blackhawks wore "CR" on their helmets for the remainder of the 2014–15 season.

== Off-season ==
On July 14, 2014, the Blackhawks announced that Kevin Dineen, a former teammate of head coach Joel Quenneville, had been hired as an assistant coach.

== Pre-season ==
The Chicago Blackhawks' pre-season schedule included a September 28, 2014, exhibition game held at the Credit Union Centre in Saskatoon, Saskatchewan, against the Edmonton Oilers.

== Standings ==
Central Division
Pos	Team	GP	W	L	OTL	ROW	GF	GA	GD	Pts
1	y – St. Louis Blues	82	51	24	7	42	248	201	+47	109
2	x – Nashville Predators	82	47	25	10	41	232	208	+24	104
3	x – Chicago Blackhawks	82	48	28	6	39	229	189	+40	102
4	x – Minnesota Wild	82	46	28	8	42	231	201	+30	100
5	x – Winnipeg Jets	82	43	26	13	36	230	210	+20	99
6	Dallas Stars	82	41	31	10	37	261	260	+1	92
7	Colorado Avalanche	82	39	31	12	29	219	227	−8	90

Source: National Hockey League
x – Clinched playoff spot; y – Clinched division

== Playoffs ==
The Chicago Blackhawks entered the playoffs as the Central Division's third seed. The Blackhawks lost the last four games of the regular season, thus they did not win the Central Division title. After defeating the Nashville Predators four games to two in the first round, they went on to sweep the Minnesota Wild in the second round, then defeated the Anaheim Ducks four games to three in the Western Conference Final. It was only the third time in Blackhawks history that they had won a playoff series after trailing three games to two. On May 19, 2015, the Blackhawks played the longest game in their history (116:12) against the Ducks as part of the Western Conference Finals. The Blackhawks defeated Anaheim in Game 7 and moved on to face the Tampa Bay Lightning in the Stanley Cup Final. On June 15, 2015, Chicago won the Stanley Cup in Game 6 by a 2–0 scoreline. This marked the Blackhawks' third Stanley Cup victory in six seasons. This was the first Blackhawks Stanley Cup clinched on home ice in 77 years, having won the decisive games in 2010 and 2013 titles on the road, and the first time a Stanley Cup title has been won in Chicago since 1992 when the Pittsburgh Penguins defeated the Blackhawks at Chicago Stadium. It was also the first time any Chicago sports team won a Championship at home since the Chicago Bulls in 1997

== Schedule and results ==
=== Pre-season ===
Pre-season game log: 2–3–1 (Home: 1–2–0; Road: 1–1–1)
#	Date	Opponent	Score	OT	Decision	Arena	Attendance	Record	Recap
1	September 23	Detroit Red Wings	2–1	OT	Darling	United Center	20,512	1–0–0	W1
2	September 25	@ Detroit Red Wings	2–3		Leighton	Joe Louis Arena	16,246	1–1–0	L1
3	September 26	New York Rangers	1–4		Crawford	United Center	20,613	1–2–0	L2
4^{[a]}	September 28	@ Edmonton Oilers	5–0		Darling	SaskTel Centre	N/A	2–2–0	W1
5	October 1	Montreal Canadiens	1–3		Raanta	United Center	20,413	2–3–0	L1
6	October 3	@ New York Rangers	2–3	SO	Crawford	Madison Square Garden	18,006	2–3–1	SOL1
Notes:^{a} Game was played at SaskTel Centre in Saskatoon, Saskatchewan.

=== Regular season ===
Game log

October: 6–3–1 (Home: 4–1–1; Road: 2–2–0) Pts. 13
#	Date	Opponent	Score	OT	Decision	Arena	Attendance	Record	Pts	Recap
1	October 9	@ Dallas Stars	3–2	SO	Crawford	American Airlines Center	18,768	1–0–0	2	W1
2	October 11	Buffalo Sabres	6–2		Crawford	United Center	22,012	2–0–0	4	W2
3	October 15	Calgary Flames	1–2	OT	Crawford	United Center	21,112	2–0–1	5	O1
4	October 18	Nashville Predators	2–1	OT	Crawford	United Center	21,640	3–0–1	7	W1
5	October 21	Philadelphia Flyers	4–0		Raanta	United Center	21,162	4–0–1	9	W2
6	October 23	@ Nashville Predators	2–3		Raanta	Bridgestone Arena	17,157	4–1–1	9	L1
7	October 25	@ St. Louis Blues	2–3		Raanta	Scottrade Center	19,434	4–2–1	9	L2
8	October 26	Ottawa Senators	2–1		Darling	United Center	21,310	5–2–1	11	W1
9	October 28	Anaheim Ducks	0–1		Darling	United Center	21,233	5–3–1	11	L1
10	October 30	@ Ottawa Senators	5–4	SO	Darling	Canadian Tire Centre	17,529	6–3–1	13	W1

November: 9–5–0 (Home: 3–2–0; Road: 6–3–0) Pts. 18
#	Date	Opponent	Score	OT	Decision	Arena	Attendance	Record	Pts	Recap
11	November 1	@ Toronto Maple Leafs	2–3		Crawford	Air Canada Centre	19,138	6–4–1	13	L1
12	November 2	Winnipeg Jets	0–1		Crawford	United Center	21,204	6–5–1	13	L2
13	November 4	@ Montreal Canadiens	5–0		Crawford	Bell Centre	21,287	7–5–1	15	W1
14	November 7	Washington Capitals	2–3		Crawford	United Center	21,892	7–6–1	15	L1
15	November 9	San Jose Sharks	5–2		Crawford	United Center	21,489	8–6–1	17	W1
16	November 11	Tampa Bay Lightning	3–2	SO	Crawford	United Center	21,345	9–6–1	19	W2
17	November 14	@ Detroit Red Wings	1–4		Crawford	Joe Louis Arena	20,027	9–7–1	19	L1
18	November 16	Dallas Stars	6–2		Crawford	United Center	21,671	10–7–1	21	W1
19	November 20	@ Calgary Flames	4–3		Crawford	Scotiabank Saddledome	19,289	11–7–1	23	W2
20	November 22	@ Edmonton Oilers	7–1		Crawford	Rexall Place	16,839	12–7–1	25	W3
21	November 23	@ Vancouver Canucks	1–4		Crawford	Rogers Arena	18,663	12–8–1	25	L1
22	November 26	@ Colorado Avalanche	3–2		Crawford	Pepsi Center	18,007	13–8–1	27	W1
23	November 28	@ Anaheim Ducks	4–1		Crawford	Honda Center	17,355	14–8–1	29	W2
24	November 29	@ Los Angeles Kings	4–1		Crawford	Staples Center	18,471	15–8–1	31	W3

December: 10–2–1 (Home: 6–1–0; Road: 4–1–1) Pts. 21
#	Date	Opponent	Score	OT	Decision	Arena	Attendance	Record	Pts	Recap
25	December 3	St. Louis Blues	4–1		Raanta	United Center	21,514	16–8–1	33	W4
26	December 5	Montreal Canadiens	4–3		Raanta	United Center	22,087	17–8–1	35	W5
27	December 6	@ Nashville Predators	3–1		Darling	Bridgestone Arena	17,212	18–8–1	37	W6
28	December 9	@ New Jersey Devils	3–2	SO	Darling	Prudential Center	16,210	19–8–1	39	W7
29	December 11	@ Boston Bruins	3–2		Darling	TD Garden	17,565	20–8–1	41	W8
30	December 13	@ New York Islanders	2–3		Darling	Nassau Veterans Memorial Coliseum	16,170	20–9–1	41	L1
31	December 14	Calgary Flames	2–1		Raanta	United Center	21,572	21–9–1	43	W1
32	December 16	Minnesota Wild	5–3		Raanta	United Center	21,472	22–9–1	45	W2
33	December 20	@ Columbus Blue Jackets	2–3	SO	Crawford	Nationwide Arena	18,164	22–9–2	46	O1
34	December 21	Toronto Maple Leafs	4–0		Raanta	United Center	22,131	23–9–2	48	W1
35	December 23	Winnipeg Jets	1–5		Crawford	United Center	22,095	23–10–2	48	L1
36	December 27	@ Colorado Avalanche	5–2		Crawford	Pepsi Center	18,085	24–10–2	50	W1
37	December 29	Nashville Predators	5–4	SO	Crawford	United Center	22,208	25–10–2	52	W2

January: 6–7–0 (Home: 3–3–0; Road: 3–4–0) Pts. 12
#	Date	Opponent	Score	OT	Decision	Arena	Attendance	Record	Pts	Recap
38	January 1 (Winter Classic)	@ Washington Capitals	2–3		Crawford	Nationals Park	42,832	25–11–2	52	L1
39	January 4	Dallas Stars	5–4	OT	Crawford	United Center	21,884	26–11–2	54	W1
40	January 6	Colorado Avalanche	0–2		Crawford	United Center	21,492	26–12–2	54	L1
41	January 8	@ Minnesota Wild	4–2		Crawford	Xcel Energy Center	19,060	27–12–2	56	W1
42	January 9	@ Edmonton Oilers	2–5		Raanta	Rexall Place	16,839	27–13–2	56	L1
43	January 11	Minnesota Wild	4–1		Crawford	United Center	21,809	28–13–2	58	W1
44	January 16	Winnipeg Jets	2–4		Crawford	United Center	22,051	28–14–2	58	L1
45	January 18	Dallas Stars	3–6		Crawford	United Center	22,135	28–15–2	58	L2
46	January 20	Arizona Coyotes	6–1		Raanta	United Center	21,427	29–15–2	60	W1
47	January 21	@ Pittsburgh Penguins	2–3	SO	Crawford	Consol Energy Center	18,655	30–15–2	62	W2
48	January 28	@ Los Angeles Kings	3–4		Crawford	Staples Center	18,525	30–16–2	62	L1
49	January 30	@ Anaheim Ducks	4–1		Crawford	Honda Center	17,497	31–16–2	64	W1
50	January 31	@ San Jose Sharks	0–2		Raanta	SAP Center at San Jose	17,562	31–17–2	64	L1

February: 6–4–3 (Home: 3–2–3; Road: 3–2–0) Pts. 15
#	Date	Opponent	Score	OT	Decision	Arena	Attendance	Record	Pts	Recap
51	February 3	@ Minnesota Wild	0–3		Crawford	Xcel Energy Center	19,104	31–18–2	64	L2
52	February 6	@ Winnipeg Jets	2–1	OT	Crawford	MTS Centre	15,016	32–18–2	66	W1
53	February 8	@ St. Louis Blues	4–2		Crawford	Scottrade Center	19,657	33–18–2	68	W2
54	February 9	Arizona Coyotes	2–3	SO	Raanta	United Center	21,337	33–18–3	69	O1
55	February 11	Vancouver Canucks	4–5	OT	Crawford	United Center	21,346	33–18–4	70	O2
56	February 13	New Jersey Devils	3–1		Crawford	United Center	22,186	34–18–4	72	W1
57	February 15	Pittsburgh Penguins	2–1	SO	Crawford	United Center	22,169	35–18–4	74	W2
58	February 18	Detroit Red Wings	2–3	SO	Crawford	United Center	22,112	35–18–5	75	O1
59	February 20	Colorado Avalanche	1–4		Crawford	United Center	22,103	35–19–5	75	L1
60	February 22	Boston Bruins	2–6		Crawford	United Center	22,104	35–20–5	75	L2
61	February 24	Florida Panthers	3–2	SO	Darling	United Center	21,526	36–20–5	77	W1
62	February 26	@ Florida Panthers	3–0		Crawford	BB&T Center	17,387	37–20–5	79	W2
63	February 27	@ Tampa Bay Lightning	0–4		Darling	Amalie Arena	19,204	37–21–5	79	L1

March: 9–3–1 (Home: 4–1–1; Road: 5–2–0) Pts. 19
#	Date	Opponent	Score	OT	Decision	Arena	Attendance	Record	Pts	Recap
64	March 2	Carolina Hurricanes	5–2		Crawford	United Center	21,641	38–21–5	81	W1
65	March 6	Edmonton Oilers	2–1	SO	Crawford	United Center	22,017	39–21–5	83	W2
66	March 8	New York Rangers	0–1	OT	Crawford	United Center	22,160	39–21–6	84	O1
67	March 12	@ Arizona Coyotes	2–1		Crawford	Gila River Arena	17,534	40–21–6	86	W1
68	March 14	@ San Jose Sharks	6–2		Crawford	SAP Center at San Jose	17,562	41–21–6	88	W2
69	March 17	New York Islanders	4–1		Crawford	United Center	22,080	42–21–6	90	W3
70	March 18	@ New York Rangers	1–0		Darling	Madison Square Garden	18,006	43–21–6	92	W4
71	March 21	@ Dallas Stars	0–4		Crawford	American Airlines Center	18,532	43–22–6	92	L1
72	March 23	@ Carolina Hurricanes	3–1		Crawford	PNC Arena	13,786	44–22–6	94	W1
73	March 25	@ Philadelphia Flyers	1–4		Crawford	Wells Fargo Center	19,831	44–23–6	94	L1
74	March 27	Columbus Blue Jackets	2–5		Crawford	United Center	22,187	44–24–6	94	L2
75	March 29	@ Winnipeg Jets	4–3		Crawford	MTS Centre	15,016	45–24–6	96	W1
76	March 30	Los Angeles Kings	4–1		Darling	United Center	21,848	46–24–6	98	W2

April: 2–4–0 (Home: 1–2–0; Road: 1–2–0) Pts. 4
#	Date	Opponent	Score	OT	Decision	Arena	Attendance	Record	Pts	Recap
77	April 2	Vancouver Canucks	3–1		Crawford	United Center	21,901	47–24–6	100	W3
78	April 3	@ Buffalo Sabres	4–3		Darling	First Niagara Center	19,070	48–24–6	102	W4
79	April 5	St. Louis Blues	1–2		Crawford	United Center	22,017	48–25–6	102	L1
80	April 7	Minnesota Wild	1–2		Crawford	United Center	21,851	48–26–6	102	L2
81	April 9	@ St. Louis Blues	1–2		Crawford	Scottrade Center	19,751	48–27–6	102	L3
82	April 11	@ Colorado Avalanche	2–3		Darling	Pepsi Center	18,049	48–28–6	102	L4

Legend: Win (2 points) Loss (0 points) Overtime/shootout loss (1 point)

Detailed records

Western Conference
Opponent	Home	Away	Total	Pts.	Goals scored	Goals allowed
Central Division
Chicago Blackhawks	–	–	–	–	–	–
Colorado Avalanche	0–2–0	2–1–0	2–3–0	4	11	13
Dallas Stars	2–1–0	1–1–0	3–2–0	6	16	18
Minnesota Wild	2–1–0	1–1–0	3–2–0	6	14	11
Nashville Predators	2–0–0	1–1–0	3–1–0	6	11	9
St. Louis Blues	1–1–0	1–2–0	2–3–0	4	12	10
Winnipeg Jets	0–3–0	2–0–0	2–3–0	4	9	14
	7–8–0	8–6–0	15–14–0	30	73	75
Pacific Division
Anaheim Ducks	0–1–0	2–0–0	2–1–0	4	8	3
Arizona Coyotes	1–0–1	1–0–0	2–0–1	5	10	4
Calgary Flames	1–0–1	1–0–0	2–0–1	5	7	6
Edmonton Oilers	1–0–0	1–1–0	2–1–0	4	10	7
Los Angeles Kings	1–0–0	1–1–0	2–1–0	4	11	6
San Jose Sharks	1–0–0	1–1–0	2–1–0	4	11	6
Vancouver Canucks	1–0–1	0–1–0	1–1–1	3	8	10
	6–1–3	7–4–0	13–5–3	29	65	42

Eastern Conference
Opponent	Home	Away	Total	Pts.	Goals scored	Goals allowed
Atlantic Division
Boston Bruins	0–1–0	1–0–0	1–1–0	2	5	8
Buffalo Sabres	1–0–0	1–0–0	2–0–0	4	10	5
Detroit Red Wings	0–0–1	0–1–0	0–1–1	1	3	6
Florida Panthers	1–0–0	1–0–0	2–0–0	4	5	2
Montreal Canadiens	1–0–0	1–0–0	2–0–0	4	9	3
Ottawa Senators	1–0–0	1–0–0	2–0–0	4	7	5
Tampa Bay Lightning	1–0–0	0–1–0	1–1–0	2	3	6
Toronto Maple Leafs	1–0–0	0–1–0	1–1–0	2	6	3
	6–1–1	5–3–0	11–4–1	23	48	38
Metropolitan Division
Carolina Hurricanes	1–0–0	1–0–0	2–0–0	4	8	3
Columbus Blue Jackets	0–1–0	0–0–1	0–1–1	1	4	6
New Jersey Devils	1–0–0	1–0–0	2–0–0	4	5	3
New York Islanders	1–0–0	0–1–0	1–1–0	2	6	4
New York Rangers	0–0–1	1–0–0	1–0–1	3	1	1
Philadelphia Flyers	1–0–0	0–1–0	1–1–0	2	5	4
Pittsburgh Penguins	1–0–0	1–0–0	2–0–0	4	3	3
Washington Capitals	0–1–0	0–1–0	0–2–0	0	4	6
	5–2–1	4–3–1	9–5–2	20	36	30

=== Playoffs ===
2015 Stanley Cup Playoffs

Western Conference First Round vs. (C2) Nashville Predators: Chicago won series 4–2
#	Date	Visitor	Score	Home	OT	Decision	Attendance	Series	Recap
1	April 15	Chicago	4–3	Nashville	2OT	Darling	17,225	1–0	Recap
2	April 17	Chicago	2–6	Nashville		Crawford	17,208	1–1	Recap
3	April 19	Nashville	2–4	Chicago		Darling	22,020	2–1	Recap
4	April 21	Nashville	2–3	Chicago	3OT	Darling	22,014	3–1	Recap
5	April 23	Chicago	2–5	Nashville		Darling	17,238	3–2	Recap
6	April 25	Nashville	3–4	Chicago		Crawford	22,171	4–2	Recap

Western Conference Second Round vs. (WC1) Minnesota Wild: Chicago won series 4–0
#	Date	Visitor	Score	Home	OT	Decision	Attendance	Series	Recap
1	May 1	Minnesota	3–4	Chicago		Crawford	21,851	1–0	Recap
2	May 3	Minnesota	1–4	Chicago		Crawford	21,934	2–0	Recap
3	May 5	Chicago	1–0	Minnesota		Crawford	19,349	3–0	Recap
4	May 7	Chicago	4–3	Minnesota		Crawford	19,163	4–0	Recap

Western Conference Final vs. (P1) Anaheim Ducks: Chicago won series 4–3
#	Date	Visitor	Score	Home	OT	Decision	Attendance	Series	Recap
1	May 17	Chicago	1–4	Anaheim		Crawford	17,291	0–1	Recap
2	May 19	Chicago	3–2	Anaheim	3OT	Crawford	17,234	1–1	Recap
3	May 21	Anaheim	2–1	Chicago		Crawford	22,160	1–2	Recap
4	May 23	Anaheim	4–5	Chicago	2OT	Crawford	22,404	2–2	Recap
5	May 25	Chicago	4–5	Anaheim	OT	Crawford	17,289	2–3	Recap
6	May 27	Anaheim	2–5	Chicago		Crawford	22,089	3–3	Recap
7	May 30	Chicago	5–3	Anaheim		Crawford	17,375	4–3	Recap

Stanley Cup Final vs. (A2) Tampa Bay Lightning: Chicago won series 4–2
#	Date	Visitor	Score	Home	OT	Decision	Attendance	Series	Recap
1	June 3	Chicago	2–1	Tampa Bay		Crawford	19,204	1–0	Recap
2	June 6	Chicago	3–4	Tampa Bay		Crawford	19,204	1–1	Recap
3	June 8	Tampa Bay	3–2	Chicago		Crawford	22,336	1–2	Recap
4	June 10	Tampa Bay	1–2	Chicago		Crawford	22,354	2–2	Recap
5	June 13	Chicago	2–1	Tampa Bay		Crawford	19,204	3–2	Recap
6	June 15	Tampa Bay	0–2	Chicago		Crawford	22,424	4–2	Recap

Legend: Win Loss

== Player stats ==
Final stats

=== Skaters ===
Note: Pos = Position; GP = Games played; G = Goals; A = Assists; Pts = Points; PIM = Penalty minutes; +/- = Plus/minus; PPG = Power-play goals; SHG = Short-handed goals; GWG = Game-winning goals

Regular season
Player	GP	G	A	Pts	+/−	PIM
Jonathan Toews	81	28	38	66	30	36
Patrick Kane	61	27	37	64	10	10
Marian Hossa	82	22	39	61	17	32
Brandon Saad	82	23	29	52	7	12
Duncan Keith	80	10	35	45	12	20
Patrick Sharp	68	16	27	43	−8	33
Brad Richards	76	12	25	37	3	12
Kris Versteeg	61	14	20	34	11	35
Brent Seabrook	82	8	23	31	−3	27
Bryan Bickell	80	14	14	28	5	38
Andrew Shaw	79	15	11	26	−8	67
Niklas Hjalmarsson	82	3	16	19	25	44
Marcus Kruger	81	7	10	17	−5	32
David Rundblad	49	3	11	14	17	12
Michal Rozsival	65	1	12	13	0	22
Johnny Oduya	76	2	8	10	5	26
Ben Smith^{‡}	61	5	4	9	−1	2
Teuvo Teravainen	34	4	5	9	4	2
Daniel Carcillo	39	4	4	8	3	54
Joakim Nordstrom	38	0	3	3	−5	4
Antoine Vermette^{†}	19	0	3	3	−2	6
Andrew Desjardins^{†}	13	0	2	2	1	7
Adam Clendening^{‡}	4	1	1	2	1	2
Trevor van Riemsdyk	18	0	1	1	0	2
Klas Dahlbeck^{‡}	4	1	0	1	−1	2
Peter Regin	4	0	1	1	1	0
Michael Paliotta	1	0	1	1	0	0
Kimmo Timonen^{†}	16	0	0	0	−3	2
Kyle Cumiskey	7	0	0	0	−1	0
Ryan Hartman	5	0	0	0	−1	2
Kyle Baun	3	0	0	0	−1	0
Phillip Danault	2	0	0	0	0	0
Jeremy Morin^{‡}	15	0	0	0	0	15
Tim Erixon^{†‡}	8	0	0	0	1	4
Totals	82	213	395	608	114	537

Playoffs
Player	GP	G	A	Pts	+/−	PIM
Patrick Kane	23	11	12	23	7	0
Jonathan Toews	23	10	11	21	7	8
Duncan Keith	23	3	18	21	16	4
Marian Hossa	23	4	13	17	7	10
Patrick Sharp	23	5	10	15	2	8
Brad Richards	23	3	11	14	4	8
Andrew Shaw	23	5	7	12	−4	36
Brandon Saad	23	8	3	11	5	6
Brent Seabrook	23	7	4	11	5	10
Teuvo Teravainen	18	4	6	10	2	0
Antoine Vermette	20	4	3	7	5	4
Niklas Hjalmarsson	23	1	5	6	6	8
Johnny Oduya	23	0	5	5	−4	6
Bryan Bickell	18	0	5	5	3	14
Marcus Kruger	23	2	2	4	−5	4
Andrew Desjardins	21	1	3	4	−4	4
Kris Versteeg	12	1	1	2	2	6
Michal Rozsival	10	0	1	1	−2	6
Kimmo Timonen	18	0	0	0	1	10
Kyle Cumiskey	9	0	0	0	-3	0
David Rundblad	5	0	0	0	2	0
Trevor van Riemsdyk	4	0	0	0	−1	0
Joakim Nordstrom	3	0	0	0	−3	0
Totals	23	69	120	189	48	152

=== Goaltenders ===
Regular season
Player	GP	GS	TOI	W	L	OT	GA	GAA	SA	SV%	SO	G	A	PIM
Corey Crawford	57	57	3,332:32	32	20	5	126	2.27	1,661	.924	2	0	1	8
Scott Darling	14	13	832:31	9	4	0	27	1.94	419	.936	1	0	0	0
Antti Raanta	14	12	792:11	7	4	1	25	1.89	389	.936	2	0	0	0
Totals		82	4,957:14	48	28	6	174	2.11	2,469	.930	5	0	1	8

Playoffs
Player	GP	GS	TOI	W	L	GA	GAA	SA	SV%	SO	G	A	PIM
Corey Crawford	20	19	1,223:48	13	6	47	2.31	616	.924	2	0	0	0
Scott Darling	5	4	297:46	3	1	11	2.21	171	.936	0	0	0	0
Totals		23	1,521	16	7	58	2.28	787	.926	2	0	0	0

^{†}Denotes player spent time with another team before joining the Blackhawks. Stats reflect time with the Blackhawks only.
^{‡}Denotes player was traded mid-season. Stats reflect time with the Blackhawks only.
Bold/italics denotes franchise record.

== Notable achievements ==
=== Awards ===
Regular season
Player	Award	Awarded
P. Kane	NHL Second Star of the Month	January 2, 2015
J. Toews	NHL All-Star game selection	January 10, 2015
P. Kane	NHL All-Star game selection	January 10, 2015
C. Crawford	NHL All-Star game selection	January 10, 2015
D. Keith	NHL All-Star game selection	January 10, 2015
B. Seabrook	NHL All-Star game selection	January 10, 2015
J. Toews	NHL All-Star game captain	January 14, 2015
P. Kane	NHL All-Star game assistant captain	January 14, 2015
M. Hossa	NHL First Star of the Week	February 16, 2015

=== Milestones ===
Regular season
Player	Milestone	Reached
T. van Riemsdyk	1st career NHL game	October 9, 2014
B. Smith	100th career NHL game	October 21, 2014
S. Darling	1st career NHL game 1st career NHL win	October 26, 2014
P. Kane	500th career NHL point	October 26, 2014
M. Hossa	1,100th career NHL game 1,000th career NHL point	October 30, 2014
J. Oduya	600th career NHL game	November 2, 2014
N. Hjalmarsson	400th career NHL game	November 4, 2014
J. Toews	200th career NHL goal	November 4, 2014
D. Keith	700th career NHL game	November 7, 2014
T. van Riemsdyk	1st career NHL assist 1st career NHL point	November 9, 2014
J. Toews	500th career NHL game	November 11, 2014
B. Richards	1,000th career NHL game	November 16, 2014
B. Seabrook	700th career NHL game	November 20, 2014
A. Clendening	1st career NHL game 1st career NHL goal 1st career NHL point	November 20, 2014
B. Richards	600th career NHL assist	November 20, 2014
P. Danault	1st career NHL game	November 22, 2014
D. Carcillo	400th career NHL game	November 22, 2014
A. Clendening	1st career NHL assist	November 22, 2014
B. Bickell	300th career NHL game	November 23, 2014
B. Seabrook	300th career NHL point	November 26, 2014
K. Dahlbeck	1st career NHL game	December 6, 2014
K. Dahlbeck	1st career NHL goal 1st career NHL point	December 11, 2014
P. Sharp	700th career NHL game	December 29, 2014
P. Sharp	500th career NHL point	December 29, 2014
A. Shaw	200th career NHL game	January 1, 2015
B. Saad	100th career NHL point	January 9, 2015
T. Teravainen	1st career NHL goal 1st career NHL point	January 16, 2015
P. Kane	200th career NHL goal	January 20, 2015
T. Teravainen	1st career NHL assist	January 20, 2015
D. Keith	400th career NHL point	January 30, 2015
D. Carcillo	100th career NHL point	February 8, 2015
R. Hartman	1st career NHL game	February 13, 2015
B. Richards	900th career NHL point	March 12, 2015
S. Darling	1st career NHL shutout	March 18, 2015
K. Timonen	1100th career NHL game	March 21, 2015
J. Toews	500th career NHL point	March 23, 2015
D. Rundblad	100th career NHL game	March 27, 2015
B. Saad	200th career NHL game	March 27, 2015
A. Shaw	100th career NHL point	March 30, 2015
N. Hjalmarsson	100th career NHL point	March 30, 2015
K. Baun	1st career NHL game	April 7, 2015
M. Paliotta	1st career NHL game 1st career NHL assist 1st career NHL point	April 11, 2015

== All Star Game ==
Chicago Blackhawks NHL All-Star representatives at the 2015 National Hockey League All-Star Game in Columbus, Ohio at Nationwide Arena.

- Corey Crawford, G, (Team Toews)
- Jonathan Toews, C, Captain, (Team Toews)
- Patrick Kane, RW, Assistant Captain, (Team Foligno), Winner of the Accuracy Shooting event in the skills competition.
- Duncan Keith, D, (Team Foligno)
- Brent Seabrook, D, (Team Toews)

== Transactions ==
The Blackhawks have been involved in the following transactions during the 2014–15 season.

=== Trades ===
Date	Details
June 27, 2014	To San Jose Sharks 1st-round pick in 2014; FLA's 3rd-round pick in 2014	To Chicago Blackhawks 1st-round pick in 2014; NYR's 6th-round pick in 2014
June 28, 2014	To Calgary Flames Brandon Bollig	To Chicago Blackhawks PIT's 3rd-round pick in 2014
October 4, 2014	To New York Islanders Nick Leddy; Kent Simpson	To Chicago Blackhawks T. J. Brennan; Anders Nilsson; Ville Pokka
December 14, 2014	To Columbus Blue Jackets Jeremy Morin	To Chicago Blackhawks Tim Erixon
January 29, 2015	To Vancouver Canucks Adam Clendening	To Chicago Blackhawks Gustav Forsling
February 26, 2015	To Toronto Maple Leafs T. J. Brennan	To Chicago Blackhawks Spencer Abbott
February 27, 2015	To Philadelphia Flyers 2nd-round pick in 2015 conditional 4th-round pick in 2016	To Chicago Blackhawks Kimmo Timonen
February 28, 2015	To Arizona Coyotes Klas Dahlbeck; 1st-round pick in 2015	To Chicago Blackhawks Antoine Vermette
March 2, 2015	To San Jose Sharks Ben Smith; Conditional 7th-round pick in 2017	To Chicago Blackhawks Andrew Desjardins

=== Free agents acquired ===
Date	Player	Former team	Contract terms (in U.S. dollars)	Ref
July 1, 2014	Scott Darling	Milwaukee Admirals	1 year, $550,000	
July 1, 2014	Cody Bass	Columbus Blue Jackets	1 year, $550,000	
July 1, 2014	Pierre-Cedric Labrie	Tampa Bay Lightning	1 year, $550,000	
July 1, 2014	Brad Richards	New York Rangers	1 year, $2 million	
July 2, 2014	Kyle Cumiskey	MODO	1 year, $600,000	
August 18, 2014	Michael Leighton	HC Donbass	1 year, $550,000	
October 5, 2014	Daniel Carcillo	New York Rangers	1 year, $550,000	
March 26, 2015	Kyle Baun	Colgate University	2 years, entry-level contract	
April 2, 2015	Tanner Kero	Michigan Technological University	2 years, entry-level contract	
April 30, 2015	Erik Gustafsson	Frölunda HC	2 years	
May 1, 2015	Artemi Panarin	SKA Saint Petersburg	2 years	

=== Free agents lost ===
Date	Player	New team	Contract terms (in U.S. dollars)	Ref
August 20, 2014	Kevin Hayes	New York Rangers	2 years, $7.5 million	
May 11, 2015	Peter Regin	Jokerit	Undisclosed	

=== Claimed via waivers ===
Player	Old team	Date claimed off waivers

=== Lost via waivers ===
Player	New team	Date
Tim Erixon	Toronto Maple Leafs	March 1, 2015

=== Player signings ===
Date	Player	Contract terms (in U.S. dollars)	Ref
June 27, 2014	Ben Smith	2 years, $3 million contract extension	
June 27, 2014	Antti Raanta	2 years, $1.5 million contract extension	
June 27, 2014	Jeremy Morin	2 years, $1.6 million contract extension	
July 1, 2014	Peter Regin	1 year, $650,000	
July 9, 2014	Patrick Kane	8 years, $84 million contract extension	
July 9, 2014	Jonathan Toews	8 years, $84 million contract extension	
February 22, 2015	Scott Darling	2 years, contract extension	
March 21, 2015	Vinnie Hinostroza	3 years, entry-level contract	
March 26, 2015	Michael Paliotta	2 years, entry-level contract	

=== Other ===
Name	Date	Details
Kevin Dineen	July 14, 2014	Named as Assistant Coach
DJ Kogut	January 14, 2015	Named as Assistant Equipment Manager

=== Suspensions/fines ===
Player	Explanation	Length	Salary	Date issued
Joakim Nordstrom	Boarding on Arizona Coyotes defenseman Oliver Ekman-Larsson during NHL Game No. 1011 in Arizona on Thursday, March 12, 2015, at 19:22 of the third period.	2 games	$6,630.82	March 13, 2015
Andrew Shaw	Diving/Embellishment during a game against the Los Angeles Kings in Chicago on Monday, March 30, 2015, at 5:24 of the first period.	—	$2,000.00	April 10, 2015

== Draft picks ==
Below are the Chicago Blackhawks' selections made at the 2014 NHL entry draft, held on June 27–28, 2014, at the Wells Fargo Center in Philadelphia, Pennsylvania.

Round	#	Player	Pos	Nationality	College/junior/club team (league)
1	20^{[a]}	Nick Schmaltz	C	United States	Green Bay Gamblers (USHL)
3	83^{[b]}	Matheson Iacopelli	RW	United States	Muskegon Lumberjacks (USHL)
3	88	Beau Starrett	C/LW	United States	South Shore Kings (USPHL PRE.)
4	98^{[c]}	Frederik Olofsson	LW	Sweden	Chicago Steel (USHL)
5	141^{[d]}	Luc Snuggerud	D	United States	Eden Prairie High School (USHS–MN)
5	148	Andreas Soderberg	D	Sweden	Skellefteå AIK Jr. (SWEDEN-JR.)
6	178	Dylan Sora	C	Canada	Aurora Tigers (OJHL)
6	179^{[e]}	Ivan Nalimov	G	Russia	SKA Saint Petersburg-2 (Russia-Jr.)
7	208	Jack Ramsey	RW	United States	Penticton Vees (BCHL)

Draft notes

- ^{a} The San Jose Sharks' first-round pick went to the Chicago Blackhawks as the result of a trade on June 27, 2014, that sent a first-round pick in 2014 (27th overall) and Florida's third-round pick in 2014 (62nd overall) to San Jose in exchange for the Rangers sixth-round pick in 2014 (179th overall) and this pick.
- The Chicago Blackhawks' first-round pick went to the San Jose Sharks as the result of a trade on June 27, 2014, that sent a first-round pick in 2014 (20th overall) and the Rangers sixth-round pick in 2014 (179th overall) to Chicago in exchange for Florida's third-round pick in 2014 (62nd overall) and this pick.
- The Chicago Blackhawks' second-round pick went to the Arizona Coyotes as the result of a trade on March 4, 2014, that sent David Rundblad and Mathieu Brisebois to Chicago in exchange for this pick.
- ^{b} The Pittsburgh Penguins' third-round pick (previously acquired by the Calgary Flames) went to the Chicago Blackhawks as a result of a trade on June 28, 2014, that sent Brandon Bollig to the Flames in exchange for this pick.
- ^{c} The Toronto Maple Leafs' fourth-round pick went to the Chicago Blackhawks as the result of a trade June 30, 2013, that sent Dave Bolland to Toronto in exchange for a second-round pick in 2013, Anaheim's fourth-round pick in 2013 and this pick.
- The Chicago Blackhawks fourth-round pick went to the New York Islanders as a result of a trade on February 6, 2014, that sent Peter Regin and Pierre-Marc Bouchard to Chicago in exchange for this pick.
- ^{d} The San Jose Sharks' fifth-round pick went to the Chicago Blackhawks as the result of a trade on June 30, 2013, that sent Anaheim's fourth-round pick in 2013 and a fifth-round pick in 2013 to San Jose in exchange for a fourth-round pick in 2013 and this pick.
- ^{e} The New York Rangers' sixth-round pick went to the Chicago Blackhawks as the result of a trade on June 27, 2014, that sent a first-round pick and Florida's third-round pick both in 2014 (27th and 62nd overall) to San Jose in exchange for a first-round pick in 2014 (20th overall) and this pick.
