= Dennis Nordström =

Swedish ice hockey player

- Born: January 19, 1994 (age 31); Tyresö, Sweden
- Height: 6 ft 0 in (183 cm)
- Weight: 174 lb (79 kg; 12 st 6 lb)
- Position: Forward
- Shoots: Left
- Elitserien team: AIK IF
- NHL draft: Undrafted
- Playing career: 2013–present

Dennis Nordström (born January 19, 1994) is a Swedish ice hockey player. He made his Elitserien debut playing with AIK IF during the 2012–13 Elitserien season.

He is the brother of ice hockey player Joakim Nordström.
