= Jeremy Morin =

American ice hockey player (born 1991)

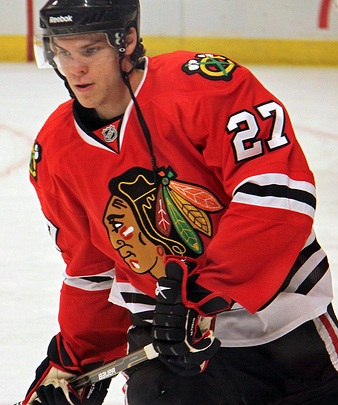
- Morin with the Chicago Blackhawks in December 2010
- Born: April 16, 1991 (age 35) Auburn, New York, U.S.
- Height: 6 ft 1 in (185 cm)
- Weight: 192 lb (87 kg; 13 st 10 lb)
- Position: Left wing
- Shot: Right
- Played for: Chicago Blackhawks; Columbus Blue Jackets; HC Yugra; HPK; SC Bern
- National team: United States
- NHL draft: 45th overall, 2009; Atlanta Thrashers
- Playing career: 2010–2018

Jeremy Morin (born April 16, 1991) is an American former professional ice hockey left winger. Morin played major junior hockey for the Kitchener Rangers of the Ontario Hockey League (OHL), the team he was drafted from in the second round, 45th overall, in 2009 by the National Hockey League (NHL)'s Atlanta Thrashers. Morin was later traded to Chicago, then the Columbus Blue Jackets, followed by a return trade to Chicago during the 2015 off-season. Morin was traded to the Toronto Maple Leafs a few months later, and would spend some time within their organization before a trade sent him to the San Jose Sharks.

Prior to playing in the OHL, Morin played for the USA Hockey National Team Development Program (NTDP) for two years, competing in the North American Hockey League (NAHL). Internationally, at the junior level, he has represented the United States on four occasions, medaling in each junior tournament.

== Playing career ==
As a youth, Morin played in the 2003 Quebec International Pee-Wee Hockey Tournament with a minor ice hockey team from Syracuse, New York.

=== Amateur career ===
Morin began his playing career in 2006–07 as a member of the Syracuse Stars in the Eastern Junior Hockey League (EJHL), being named EJHL Rookie of the Year. The following season, Morin joined the United States National Team Developmental Program (NTDP). He played two seasons with the NTDP, leading the team in scoring with 33 goals and 59 points and tied for first with five game-winning goals in 55 games. At the end of the 2008–09 season, Morin was selected in the second round, 45th overall, in the 2009 NHL entry draft by the Atlanta Thrashers.

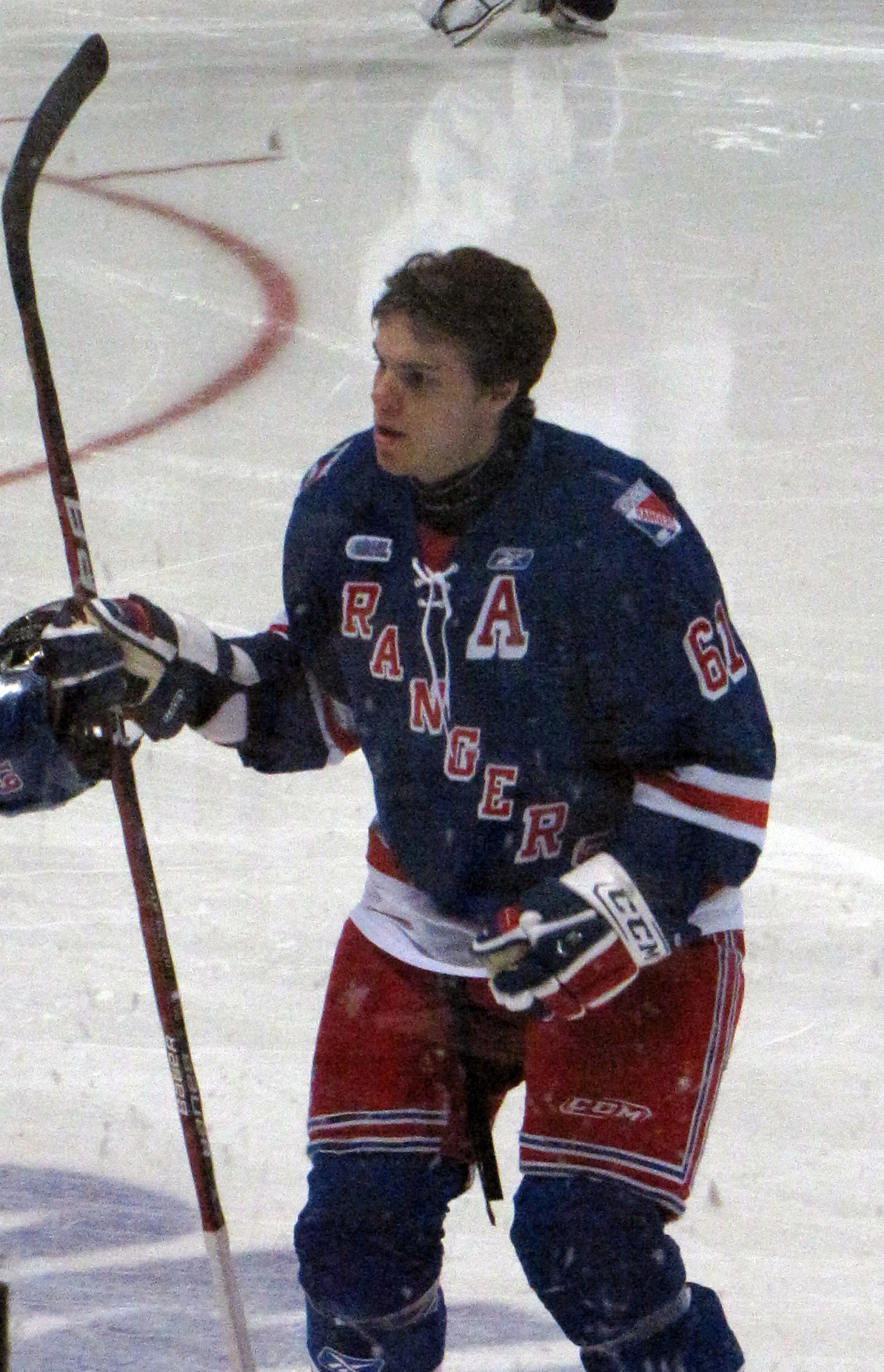
Morin as a Kitchener Ranger in September 2010.

After playing for the NTDP, Morin joined the Kitchener Rangers of the Ontario Hockey League (OHL), where he scored 83 points in 58 regular season games in 2009–10. He was named the Canadian Hockey League (CHL)'s Player of the Week for the fifth week of the 2010 playoffs after registering six goals and one assist in four games, highlighted by two hat-tricks.

=== Professional ===
On June 1, 2010, Morin signed an entry-level contract with Atlanta. Twenty-three days later, he was traded to the Chicago Blackhawks as part of a deal that sent first- (24th overall) and second-round picks (both previously belonging to the New Jersey Devils) in the 2010 NHL entry draft (as well as Marty Reasoner and Joey Crabb) to Chicago in exchange for Dustin Byfuglien, Brent Sopel, Ben Eager and Akim Aliu.

Prior to the 2010–11 season, Morin had a strong training camp and made an impression on Blackhawks head coach Joel Quenneville, while tying for second on the team in pre-season scoring with four points. However, the Blackhawks assigned Morin to their American Hockey League (AHL) affiliate, the Rockford IceHogs, to begin the year. After playing eight games with Rockford, leading the team in power play goals with three, Morin was recalled from the AHL on November 5, 2010 due to injuries to Dave Bolland and Marian Hossa, respectively. He made his NHL debut the next day at Philips Arena against the team that originally drafted him, the Atlanta Thrashers. He would also play the following game on November 7 against the Edmonton Oilers to replace Bryan Bickell in the line-up where the Blackhawks would lose 2–1. Within his first two NHL games, where he registered four shots on goal and two blocked shots; he reassigned to Rockford after three days with Chicago. Following an injury to Marián Hossa in practice on November 29, Morin was recalled as his replacement on November 30. At the time of his second call-up, Morin was leading the IceHogs in goals, with six, and was tied for third on the team with nine points. Later that day, in a game against the St. Louis Blues where the Blackhawks won 7–5, Morin registered his first NHL point, a power play assist on a goal scored by Troy Brouwer and registered his first NHL fight in a bout with the Blues' forward Chris Porter, whom he fought three weeks earlier on November 9 during a Rockford game against the Peoria Rivermen. He played in the Blackhawks next two games in a 3–0 loss to the Vancouver Canucks on December 3 and a 4–2 win over the Calgary Flames on December 5, before being assigned to Rockford on December 6. However, the move was believed to be an attempt at saving money against the team's salary cap. As anticipated, the Blackhawks recalled Morin prior to their next game against the Dallas Stars while placing Hossa on injured reserve along with Patrick Kane. During the game, on December 8, Morin scored his first NHL goal, beating Stars' goaltender Andrew Raycroft 1:36 into the second period of a 5–3 Blackhawks victory. However, the Blackhawks' cap concerns remained, and Morin was again reassigned to Rockford the following day. He continued to bounce back and forth between Rockford and Chicago but with the return of Fernando Pisani from injury just before Christmas Break along with the returns of Hossa, Kane and Viktor Stålberg from their respective injuries after the holiday break, Morin was not needed in the Blackhawks line-up and was subsequently loaned to Team USA for the 2011 World Junior Championships. Following the tournament, Morin returned to Rockford but in a game against the Chicago Wolves on January 15, 2011, Morin suffered what was believed to be a concussion and missed the remainder of the season for both the Blackhawks and IceHogs. He finished his first professional season playing in 31 games (22 games for the IceHogs and nine for the Blackhawks) scoring ten goals and 15 points (eight goals and four assists for 12 points for the IceHogs followed by two goals and one assist for three points for the Blackhawks) between the NHL and AHL.

Morin was unable to return to the ice until the start of training camp, but was still unable to participate in pre-season games due to post-concussion syndrome related symptoms from the aforementioned concussion the previous season. Assigned to Rockford, he missed the first two games of the 2011–12 season. He played in 22 games for the IceHogs, registering 15 points, before he was recalled by the Blackhawks for the team's December 18 game with the Calgary Flames. In the game, Morin spent some time on the Blackhawks' top line alongside Jonathan Toews and Patrick Kane, but went pointless in 10:23 of ice time.

On June 27, 2014, the Blackhawks signed Morin to a two-year contract extension. During the 2014–15 season, on December 14, Morin was traded to the Columbus Blue Jackets in exchange for defenseman Tim Erixon.

On June 30, 2015, Morin was reacquired by the Blackhawks (alongside Marko Daňo, Artem Anisimov, Corey Tropp and a fourth-round draft pick in 2016) in a multi-player deal that sent Brandon Saad, Alex Broadhurst and Michael Paliotta to Columbus. In the 2015–16 season, Morin was familiarly returned to Chicago's AHL affiliate, the IceHogs. In 28 games, he contributed to the IceHogs with 22 points before on January 3, 2016, he was traded to the Toronto Maple Leafs in exchange for right winger Richard Pánik. Morin was directly assigned to the AHL's Toronto Marlies and appeared in just 13 games before he was again included in a trade (alongside James Reimer) to the San Jose Sharks in exchange for Alex Stalock, Ben Smith and a conditional fourth-round pick in 2018 on February 27, 2016. Morin completed the season playing in 18 games for 14 points with the Sharks' AHL affiliate, the San Jose Barracuda.

On July 1, 2016, as a free agent, Morin left the Sharks to sign a one-year, two-way contract with the Tampa Bay Lightning. He was assigned to Tampa's AHL affiliate, the Syracuse Crunch, to begin the 2016–17 season. On February 25, 2017, Morin was traded to the Arizona Coyotes in exchange for Stefan Fournier.

Familiarly a free agent at seasons end, Morin signed his first contract abroad in agreeing to a one-year contract with HC Yugra of the Kontinental Hockey League (KHL). In the 2017–18 season, Morin featured in just three scoreless games before mutually opting to terminate his contract with Yugra on September 21, 2017. He returned to North America and agreed to play in the ECHL, signing a one-year deal with the South Carolina Stingrays on October 13, 2017.

On December 2, 2017, Morin signed a one-month contract with SC Bern of the Swiss National League as a replacement for injured Mika Pyörälä. Morin eventually appeared in one NL game with Bern, failing to score a point, before being released on January 3, 2018. Morin continued his whirlwind year by signing a one-year contract with the Swiss League's SC Rapperswil-Jona Lakers on January 9, 2018.

After helping the Lakers return to the top-flight National League, Morin left as a free agent to return to North America. He was later announced to have secured an AHL professional try-out contract with the AHL's Hershey Bears, making the opening night roster for the 2018–19 season. He appeared in three scoreless games with the Bears before he was released from his professional try-out contract on October 30, 2018.

== International play ==
Medal record

Representing United States

Ice hockey

World Championships
Bronze medal – third place	2015 Czech Republic	

World Junior Championships
Gold medal – first place	2010 Canada	
Bronze medal – third place	2011 United States	

IIHF World U18 Championships
Gold medal – first place	2009 United States	
Bronze medal – third place	2008 Russia	

World U-17 Hockey Challenge
Silver medal – second place	2008 Canada	

Morin made his international debut in 2008 representing the United States at the IIHF World U18 Championships. In his first international tournament, he scored a team-leading six goals in seven contests. the United States defeated Sweden 6–3 in the Bronze medal game earning Morin his first international medal. Morin finished the tournament eighth overall in scoring with eight points. The following year, he again represented the United States at the 2009 IIHF World U18 Championships. Team USA defeated Russia in the final, 5–0, winning the gold medal. Morin lead the team in goal scoring, with seven and tied for second in points, with ten, his ten points ranked him tenth in tournament scoring. Morin also represented the United States at the 2010 World Junior Championships, where he registered five assists and seven points in seven games. In the tournament final, the U.S. defeated Canada 6–5 in overtime, winning gold. After being loaned from the Blackhawks so he could participate in the 2011 World Junior Championships, Morin was named an alternate captain for Team USA. During the team's first game, a 3–2 overtime win against Finland, Morin suffered what was thought to be a significant shoulder injury. However, he returned to the American lineup after missing only one game. In the tournament quarterfinals, the U.S. lost to Canada, 4–1. They rebounded in the bronze medal game defeating Sweden 4–2. The victory marked the first time Team USA won medals in back-to-back tournaments, and the first medal they won on home soil. During the tournament, Morin registered one assist through four games.

== Playing style ==
Morin was known as a goal-scorer in juniors. He has the ability to shoot from anywhere and find open space to shoot, often going to the front of the net and finding space to score. He possesses a quick release that accompanies a solid shot. Morin is considered a gritty player for a goal scorer; he plays hard and has a bit of an edge in his game. He plays a solid all-round game, possesses a high hockey IQ, and competes every shift.

== Personal ==
Morin's cousin, J. D. Forrest, plays professionally in Finland, while his older brother Chad was also a member of the NTDP and went on to play for Harvard University in the ECAC. Morin also had an uncle who played college hockey.

== Career statistics ==
=== Regular season and playoffs ===
			Regular season					Playoffs
Season	Team	League	GP	G	A	Pts	PIM	GP	G	A	Pts	PIM
2006–07	Syracuse Stars	EJHL	45	26	28	54	0	—	—	—	—	—
2007–08	U.S. NTDP U17	USDP	7	11	1	12	4	—	—	—	—	—
2007–08	U.S. NTDP U18	USDP	28	20	14	34	36	—	—	—	—	—
2007–08	U.S. NTDP U18	NAHL	30	17	17	34	26	—	—	—	—	—
2008–09	U.S. NTDP Juniors	NAHL	14	12	15	27	28	—	—	—	—	—
2008–09	U.S. NTDP U18	USDP	41	21	11	32	79	—	—	—	—	—
2009–10	Kitchener Rangers	OHL	58	47	36	83	76	20	12	9	21	32
2010–11	Rockford IceHogs	AHL	22	8	4	12	34	—	—	—	—	—
2010–11	Chicago Blackhawks	NHL	9	2	1	3	9	—	—	—	—	—
2011–12	Chicago Blackhawks	NHL	3	0	0	0	0	—	—	—	—	—
2011–12	Rockford IceHogs	AHL	69	18	22	40	121	—	—	—	—	—
2012–13	Rockford IceHogs	AHL	67	30	28	58	86	—	—	—	—	—
2012–13	Chicago Blackhawks	NHL	3	1	1	2	0	—	—	—	—	—
2013–14	Rockford IceHogs	AHL	47	24	23	47	58	—	—	—	—	—
2013–14	Chicago Blackhawks	NHL	24	5	6	11	32	2	0	0	0	2
2014–15	Chicago Blackhawks	NHL	15	0	0	0	15	—	—	—	—	—
2014–15	Rockford IceHogs	AHL	3	1	0	1	2	—	—	—	—	—
2014–15	Columbus Blue Jackets	NHL	28	2	4	6	13	—	—	—	—	—
2015–16	Rockford IceHogs	AHL	28	9	13	22	24	—	—	—	—	—
2015–16	Toronto Marlies	AHL	13	2	4	6	8	—	—	—	—	—
2015–16	San Jose Barracuda	AHL	18	5	9	14	12	4	0	0	0	2
2016–17	Syracuse Crunch	AHL	43	9	12	21	22	—	—	—	—	—
2016–17	Tucson Roadrunners	AHL	20	7	2	9	23	—	—	—	—	—
2017–18	HC Yugra	KHL	3	0	0	0	0	—	—	—	—	—
2017–18	South Carolina Stingrays	ECHL	2	0	1	1	0	—	—	—	—	—
2017–18	HPK	Liiga	7	1	3	4	2	—	—	—	—	—
2017–18	SC Bern	NL	1	0	0	0	0	—	—	—	—	—
2017–18	Rapperswil–Jona Lakers	SUI.2	10	3	5	8	46	9	2	4	6	6
2018–19	Hershey Bears	AHL	3	0	0	0	2	—	—	—	—	—
AHL totals			333	113	117	230	392	4	0	0	0	2
NHL totals			82	10	12	22	69	2	0	0	0	2

=== International ===
Year	Team	Event	Result	GP	G	A	Pts	PIM
2008	United States	U17	2nd place, silver medalist(s)	6	6	2	8	2
2008	United States	WJC18	3rd place, bronze medalist(s)	7	6	2	8	6
2009	United States	WJC18	1st place, gold medalist(s)	7	6	4	10	8
2010	United States	WJC	1st place, gold medalist(s)	7	2	5	7	0
2011	United States	WJC	3rd place, bronze medalist(s)	4	0	1	1	2
2015	United States	WC	3rd place, bronze medalist(s)	10	0	0	0	0
Junior totals				31	20	14	34	18
Senior totals				10	0	0	0	0

- All statistics taken from NHL.com
