= Joakim Nordström =

Swedish ice hockey player (born 1992)

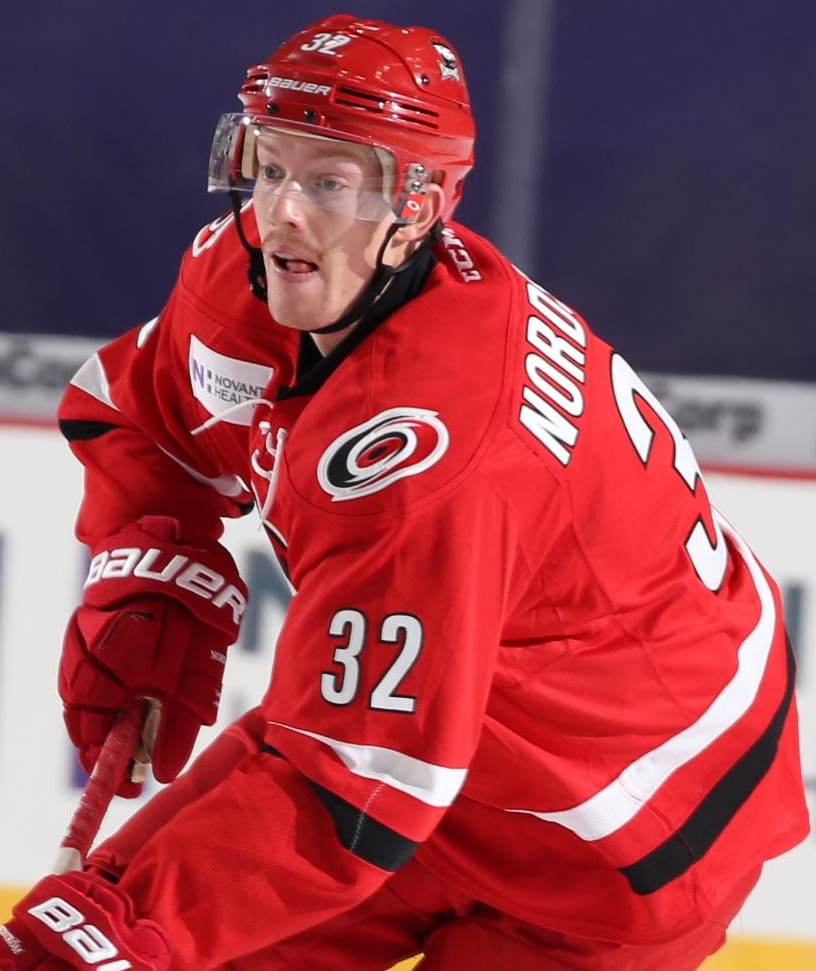
- Nordström with the Carolina Hurricanes in 2015
- Born: 25 February 1992 (age 34) Stockholm, Sweden
- Height: 6 ft 1 in (185 cm)
- Weight: 190 lb (86 kg; 13 st 8 lb)
- Position: Centre
- Shoots: Left
- NL team Former teams: HC Davos; AIK IF; Chicago Blackhawks; Carolina Hurricanes; Boston Bruins; Calgary Flames; CSKA Moscow
- National team: Sweden
- NHL draft: 90th overall, 2010; Chicago Blackhawks
- Playing career: 2010–present

Joakim Nordström (born 25 February 1992) is a Swedish professional ice hockey centre who is currently playing with HC Davos of the National League (NL). He won the World Championships in 2017 with Sweden and the Stanley Cup with the Chicago Blackhawks in 2015. He was selected by the Chicago Blackhawks in the third round, 90th overall in the 2010 NHL entry draft. He is the brother of Dennis Nordström.

== Playing career ==
Nordström made his SHL debut on 23 September 2010 against Södertälje SK. He signed a three-year, entry-level contract with the Blackhawks on 29 May 2012, but remained with AIK for the 2012–13 season. Nordström made his NHL debut with the Blackhawks on 1 October 2013. He scored his first NHL goal on 11 October 2013 against Kevin Poulin of the New York Islanders. Nordström was sent down to the Rockford IceHogs of the AHL on 21 October 2013, where he played before being recalled back to the Blackhawks on 2 April 2014.

In the 2014–15 season with the IceHogs, Nordström was the captain of the IceHogs though he played 38 games with the Blackhawks, including three in the playoffs, and was part of the team that won the Stanley Cup in 2015.

On 13 March 2015, Nordström was suspended for two games for boarding against Arizona Coyotes defenseman Oliver Ekman-Larsson in a game the previous night.

Approaching the 2015–16 season, on 11 September 2015, he was traded by the Blackhawks to the Carolina Hurricanes with Kris Versteeg as a salary-cutting measure.

After three seasons within the Hurricanes organization, Nordström left as a free agent to sign a two-year, $2 million contract with the Boston Bruins on 1 July 2018. Nordström's first Bruins goal came on 12 October 2018, as the third Bruins goal en route to a 4–1 home ice victory against the Edmonton Oilers.

At the conclusion of his contract with the Bruins, Nordström left to sign a one-year, $700,000 contract with his fourth NHL club, the Calgary Flames, on 19 October 2020.

Following his eighth season in the NHL, unable to help the Flames qualify for the playoffs, Nordström left North America as a free agent and signed a one-year contract with Russian club, CSKA Moscow of the Kontinental Hockey League (KHL), on 4 June 2021. In the 2021–22 season, in a checking-line role Nordström registered three goals and 14 points through 27 regular season games. He made two playoff appearances before terminating his contract with CSKA on 4 March 2022 due to the Russian invasion of Ukraine.

As a free agent, Nordström moved to the Swiss National League, signing a two-year contract with HC Davos on 2 June 2022.

== Career statistics ==
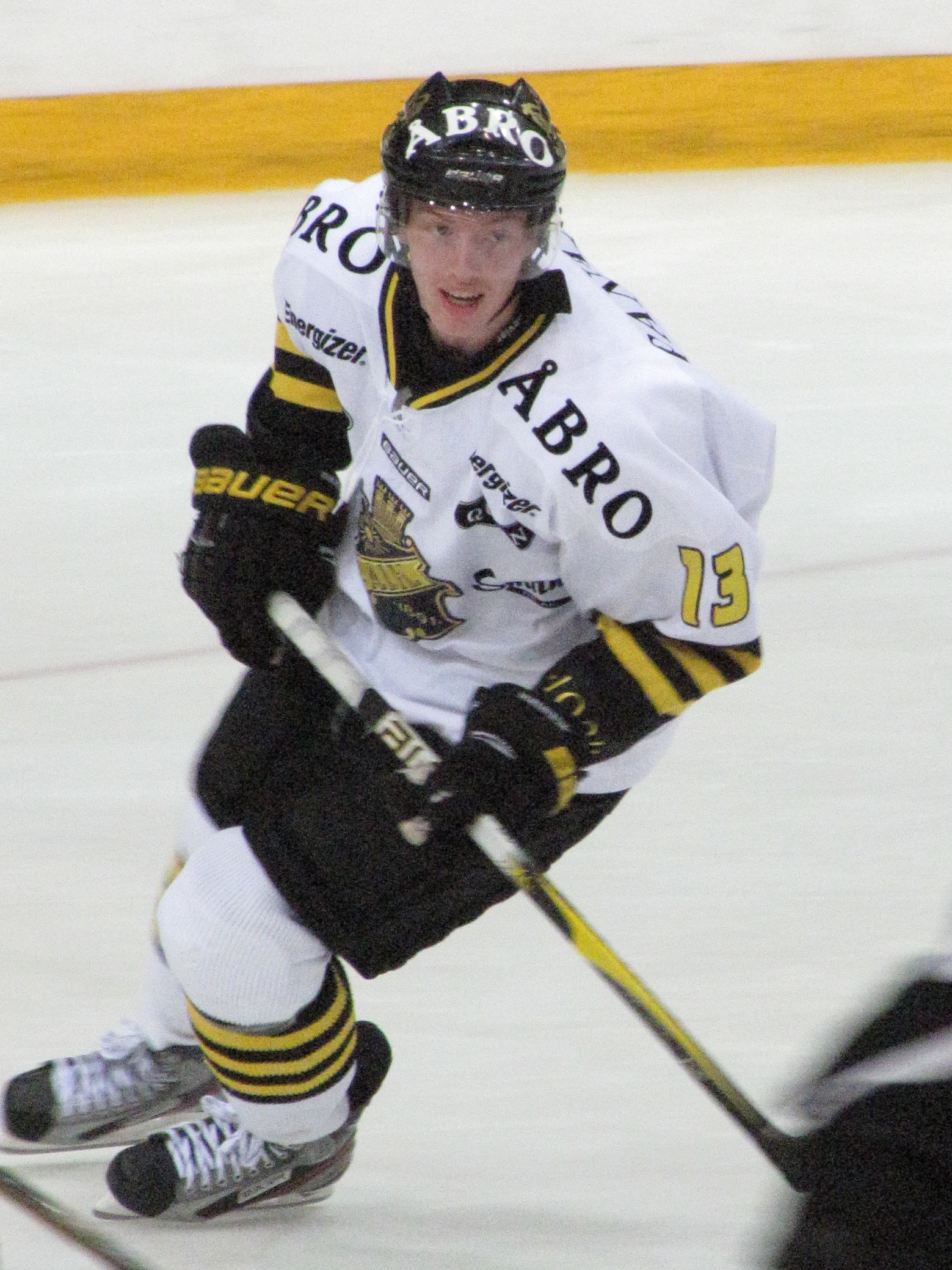
Nordström with AIK IF in 2011

=== Regular season and playoffs ===
			Regular season					Playoffs
Season	Team	League	GP	G	A	Pts	PIM	GP	G	A	Pts	PIM
2008–09	AIK	J18	22	6	11	17	18	—	—	—	—	—
2008–09	AIK	J18 Allsv	13	2	5	7	14	7	2	2	4	2
2008–09	AIK	J20	4	2	0	2	2	—	—	—	—	—
2009–10	AIK	J18 Allsv	2	1	1	2	0	3	1	2	3	4
2009–10	AIK	J20	28	6	9	15	53	—	—	—	—	—
2009–10	AIK	Allsv	2	0	0	0	0	—	—	—	—	—
2010–11	AIK	J20	25	9	11	20	36	—	—	—	—	—
2010–11	AIK	SEL	11	0	1	1	0	1	0	0	0	0
2010–11	Almtuna IS	Allsv	12	0	1	1	4	—	—	—	—	—
2011–12	AIK	SEL	47	3	3	6	4	10	1	2	3	2
2012–13	AIK	SEL	43	5	4	9	29	—	—	—	—	—
2012–13	Rockford IceHogs	AHL	11	0	3	3	12	—	—	—	—	—
2013–14	Chicago Blackhawks	NHL	16	1	2	3	2	7	0	0	0	0
2013–14	Rockford IceHogs	AHL	58	17	16	33	21	—	—	—	—	—
2014–15	Chicago Blackhawks	NHL	38	0	3	3	4	3	0	0	0	0
2014–15	Rockford IceHogs	AHL	23	9	7	16	19	—	—	—	—	—
2015–16	Carolina Hurricanes	NHL	71	10	14	24	12	—	—	—	—	—
2015–16	Charlotte Checkers	AHL	2	1	0	1	0	—	—	—	—	—
2016–17	Carolina Hurricanes	NHL	82	7	5	12	17	—	—	—	—	—
2017–18	Carolina Hurricanes	NHL	75	2	5	7	6	—	—	—	—	—
2018–19	Boston Bruins	NHL	70	7	5	12	13	23	3	5	8	4
2019–20	Boston Bruins	NHL	48	4	3	7	17	13	0	2	2	2
2020–21	Calgary Flames	NHL	44	1	6	7	6	—	—	—	—	—
2021–22	CSKA Moscow	KHL	27	3	11	14	12	2	0	0	0	0
2022–23	HC Davos	NL	50	12	23	35	41	4	1	0	1	0
2023–24	HC Davos	NL	51	11	23	34	51	5	0	2	2	8
SHL totals			101	8	8	16	33	11	1	2	3	2
NHL totals			444	32	43	75	77	46	3	7	10	6
KHL totals			27	3	11	14	12	2	0	0	0	0
NL totals			101	23	46	69	92	9	1	2	3	8

Medal record

Representing Sweden

Ice hockey

World Championships
Gold medal – first place	2017 Germany/France	

World Junior Championships
Gold medal – first place	2012 Calgary	

IIHF World U18 Championship
Silver medal – second place	2010 Minsk	

=== International ===
Year	Team	Event	Result	GP	G	A	Pts	PIM
2010	Sweden	WJC18	2nd place, silver medalist(s)	6	0	2	2	6
2012	Sweden	WJC	1st place, gold medalist(s)	6	4	1	5	0
2017	Sweden	WC	1st place, gold medalist(s)	9	1	2	3	0
2022	Sweden	OG	4th	6	1	1	2	6
2022	Sweden	WC	6th	8	2	1	3	4
Junior totals				12	4	3	7	6
Senior totals				23	4	4	8	10

== Awards and honours ==
Award	Year
KHL
Gagarin Cup (CSKA Moscow)	2022
