= Antoine Vermette =

Canadian ice hockey player (born 1982)

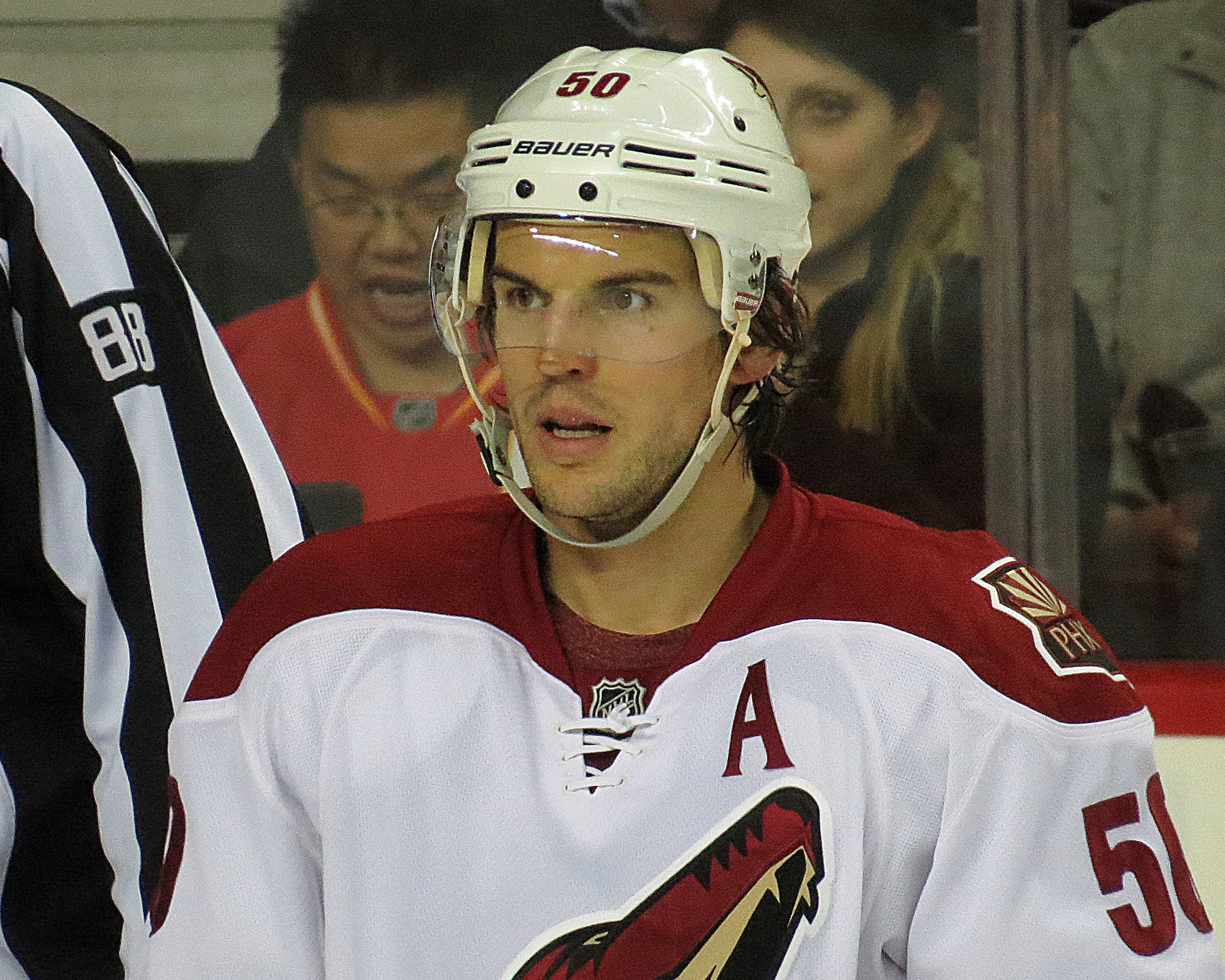
- Vermette with the Phoenix Coyotes in 2014
- Born: July 20, 1982 (age 44) Saint-Agapit, Quebec, Canada
- Height: 6 ft 1 in (185 cm)
- Weight: 196 lb (89 kg; 14 st 0 lb)
- Position: Centre
- Shot: Left
- Played for: Ottawa Senators; Columbus Blue Jackets; Arizona Coyotes; Chicago Blackhawks; Anaheim Ducks
- National team: Canada
- NHL draft: 55th overall, 2000; Ottawa Senators
- Playing career: 2002–2018

Antoine Vermette (born July 20, 1982) is a Canadian former professional ice hockey centre who played for 14 seasons in the National Hockey League (NHL).

Vermette played in the NHL for the Ottawa Senators, Columbus Blue Jackets, Arizona Coyotes, Chicago Blackhawks and Anaheim Ducks. Drafted in the second round, 55th overall in 2000 by Ottawa, Vermette was a member of the 2007 Senators team that appeared in the 2007 Stanley Cup Final. Vermette won the Stanley Cup in 2015 with the Chicago Blackhawks.

== Playing career ==
=== Amateur ===
As a youth, Vermette played in the 1995 and 1996 Quebec International Pee-Wee Hockey Tournaments with minor ice hockey teams from Chaudière-Appalaches, and South Shore in Quebec.

Vermette played four seasons in the Quebec Major Junior Hockey League (QMJHL). Upon being drafted in the second round, 55th overall, by the Ottawa Senators at the 2000 NHL entry draft, he returned to the QMJHL for two more seasons and recorded a major junior career-high 119 points in 2000–01. In his final year of junior, Vermette was limited to just four games during the regular season due to a mis-diagnosed nerve problem in his neck originally thought to be post-concussion syndrome. He returned in the playoffs to contribute 26 points in 22 games, leading the Victoriaville Tigres to the 2002 President's Cup as QMJHL champions, as well as an appearance in the 2002 Memorial Cup in Guelph, Ontario, finishing with a silver medal from the tournament after falling in the finals to the Western Hockey League (WHL)'s Kootenay Ice.

=== Ottawa Senators ===
Emerging from his major junior career, Vermette played the 2002–03 season with Ottawa's American Hockey League (AHL) affiliate, the Binghamton Senators. In 74 games, he scored 18 goals and 20 assists and earned a place on the AHL All-Rookie Team. The following season, 2003–04, Vermette earned an NHL roster spot with Ottawa out of training camp. In his rookie NHL season, he would appear in 57 games, scoring 14 points.

During the 2004–05 NHL lock-out, Vermette returned to Binghamton and scored 28 goals and 45 assists, second in team scoring only to Jason Spezza. As NHL play resumed the next season, Vermette broke out with 21 goals. He proved to be a valuable part of the Senators' line-up, providing valuable secondary scoring behind the team's top line of Dany Heatley, Jason Spezza and Daniel Alfredsson. Vermette's six short-handed goals ranked second in the League in the statistic. In light of the 2006 Stanley Cup playoffs, the Senators were considered Stanley Cup contenders by many, but were ultimately upset by the Buffalo Sabres in five games. In the subsequent off-season, on July 18, Vermette signed a two-year, $2 million contract extension with Ottawa.

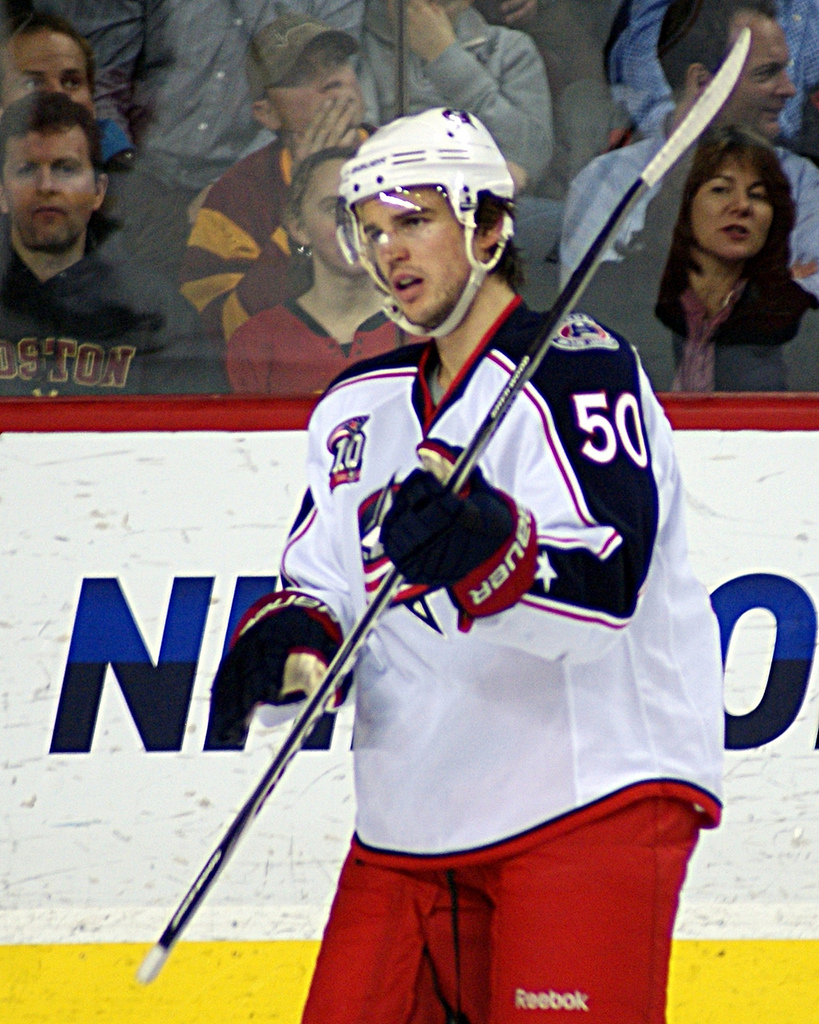
Vermette during his tenure with the Blue Jackets.

In 2006–07, Vermette continued to improve, increasing his points total to 39 points, spending the majority of the season on a checking line with fellow penalty-killer Chris Kelly. The duo were rarely apart. On December 2, 2006, Vermette famously scored from behind the net through his legs on the short side against the Tampa Bay Lightning goaltender Johan Holmqvist. The goal became well known around the League and was named TSN's "Goal of the Season." During the 2007 playoffs, Vermette recorded five points in 20 games and helped the Senators to the Prince of Wales Trophy as Eastern Conference champions before ultimately losing the Stanley Cup to the Anaheim Ducks in five games.

Vermette recorded his first career hat-trick on April 3, 2008, against Vesa Toskala in an 8–2 win against the Toronto Maple Leafs. After completing another career-year in 2007–08, recording personal bests with 24 goals, 29 assists and 53 points, Vermette re-signed with the Senators on July 31, 2008, to a two-year, $2.525 million contract, thereby avoiding salary arbitration.

=== Columbus Blue Jackets ===
Leading up to the 2009 NHL trade deadline, Vermette was widely rumoured to be the centerpiece of trade talks between the Senators and the Columbus Blue Jackets. Columbus General Manager Scott Howson, looking for scoring help as his team attempted to make the playoffs for the first time in its history, was reportedly offering star goaltender Pascal Leclaire, who had finished second in fan voting among Western Conference goaltenders for the 56th NHL All-Star Game, in exchange for Vermette. The deal became official on March 4 when Vermette was traded to Columbus for Leclaire and Columbus' second-round pick in the 2009 NHL entry draft, which Ottawa would ultimately use to select goaltender Robin Lehner. Vermette would spend parts of four seasons with the Blue Jackets, recording 61 goals in 241 games.

=== Phoenix/Arizona Coyotes ===
Vermette was traded to the Phoenix Coyotes on February 22, 2012, in exchange for goaltender Curtis McElhinney, a 2012 second-round draft pick and a conditional 2013 fifth-round draft pick. He would go on to score five goals with five assists for the Coyotes during the 2012 playoffs.

On December 21, 2013, Vermette recorded his second career hat-trick in a 4–3 win against his former team, the Ottawa Senators. Vermette's third goal of the night proved to be the game-winning goal in overtime.

In both the 2012–13 and 2013–14 regular seasons with the Coyotes, Vermette finished in the top ten NHL leader list in faceoff win percentage; he finished both seasons with a faceoff win percentage above 56%.

=== Chicago Blackhawks ===
On February 28, 2015, the Coyotes traded Vermette, a pending unrestricted free agent, to the Chicago Blackhawks in exchange for Klas Dahlbeck and a 2015 first-round draft pick (Nick Merkley) at the trade deadline. From the Coyotes to the Blackhawks, Vermette's role transitioned from a top-line forward to a role player with limited ice-time. Vermette recorded only three assists during the rest of the 2014-15 regular season without any goals. Vermette was a healthy scratch for the first two games of the 2015 Stanley Cup playoffs. Shortly after being reinstated into the line-up, Vermette scored his first goal as a Blackhawk against the Nashville Predators on April 22. On May 23, Vermette scored the game-winning goal against the Anaheim Ducks in double overtime of the Western Conference Finals to tie the series 2-2. Vermette and the Blackhawks defeated the Tampa Bay Lightning to win the 2015 Stanley Cup. He finished the playoffs with four goals, including three game winners, and three assists. Vermette was also dominant on the face-off dot, winning 166 of 282 draws for a 58.9% face-off win percentage during the postseason.

=== Return to Arizona ===
On July 1, 2015, Vermette returned to the Arizona Coyotes on a two-year deal. Vermette played in 76 games during the 2015–16 season. He scored 17 goals and 21 assists. On August 1, 2016, the Coyotes waived and bought-out the remaining $3.75 million on his contract with the intent on inserting their youth into the line-up.

=== Anaheim Ducks ===
On August 15, 2016, Vermette agreed to a two-year contract with the Anaheim Ducks. During his first season with the Ducks in 2016–17, on February 15, 2017, Vermette was suspended 10 games for slashing linesman Shandor Alphonso during a game between the Ducks and the Minnesota Wild that took place the previous day.

=== Retirement ===
Vermette retired on January 31, 2019 after 14 seasons in the NHL. He tallied 228 goals and 287 assists in 1046 regular season games. Vermette retired with a 56.6 career faceoff win percentage, which was the ninth best among all players since the NHL began tracking the stat in 1997.

== Personal life ==
In 2009, Vermette married his childhood sweetheart, Karen, a pharmacist. They have two daughters.

== Career statistics ==
=== Regular season and playoffs ===
			Regular season					Playoffs
Season	Team	League	GP	G	A	Pts	PIM	GP	G	A	Pts	PIM
1998–99	Quebec Remparts	QMJHL	57	9	17	26	32	13	0	0	0	2
1999–2000	Victoriaville Tigres	QMJHL	71	30	41	71	87	6	0	1	1	6
2000–01	Victoriaville Tigres	QMJHL	71	57	62	119	102	9	4	6	10	14
2001–02	Victoriaville Tigres	QMJHL	4	0	2	2	6	22	10	16	26	10
2002–03	Binghamton Senators	AHL	74	18	20	38	54	18	2	2	4	16
2003–04	Ottawa Senators	NHL	57	7	7	14	16	4	0	1	1	4
2003–04	Binghamton Senators	AHL	3	0	0	0	6	—	—	—	—	—
2004–05	Binghamton Senators	AHL	78	28	45	73	36	6	1	4	5	10
2005–06	Ottawa Senators	NHL	82	21	12	33	44	10	2	0	2	4
2006–07	Ottawa Senators	NHL	77	19	20	39	52	20	2	3	5	6
2007–08	Ottawa Senators	NHL	81	24	29	53	51	4	0	0	0	4
2008–09	Ottawa Senators	NHL	62	9	19	28	42	—	—	—	—	—
2008–09	Columbus Blue Jackets	NHL	17	7	6	13	8	4	0	0	0	10
2009–10	Columbus Blue Jackets	NHL	82	27	38	65	32	—	—	—	—	—
2010–11	Columbus Blue Jackets	NHL	82	19	28	47	60	—	—	—	—	—
2011–12	Columbus Blue Jackets	NHL	60	8	19	27	12	—	—	—	—	—
2011–12	Phoenix Coyotes	NHL	22	3	7	10	16	16	5	5	10	24
2012–13	Phoenix Coyotes	NHL	48	13	8	21	36	—	—	—	—	—
2013–14	Phoenix Coyotes	NHL	82	24	21	45	44	—	—	—	—	—
2014–15	Arizona Coyotes	NHL	63	13	22	35	34	—	—	—	—	—
2014–15	Chicago Blackhawks	NHL	19	0	3	3	6	20	4	3	7	4
2015–16	Arizona Coyotes	NHL	76	17	21	38	93	—	—	—	—	—
2016–17	Anaheim Ducks	NHL	72	9	19	28	42	17	1	2	3	2
2017–18	Anaheim Ducks	NHL	64	8	8	16	34	2	0	0	0	0
NHL totals			1,046	228	287	515	622	97	14	14	28	58

=== International ===
Year	Team	Event	Result	GP	G	A	Pts	PIM
2011	Canada	WC	5th	4	0	0	0	0
Senior totals				4	0	0	0	0

== Awards and honours ==
Award	Year
QMJHL
Mike Bossy Trophy (top draft prospect)	2000
CHL Top Prospects Game	2000
AHL
All-Rookie Team	2003
NHL
Stanley Cup (Chicago Blackhawks)	2015

Awards and achievements
Preceded by Maxime Ouellet	Winner of the Mike Bossy Trophy; 1999–2000	Succeeded by Aleš Hemský
