= David Rundblad =

Swedish ice hockey player (born 1990)

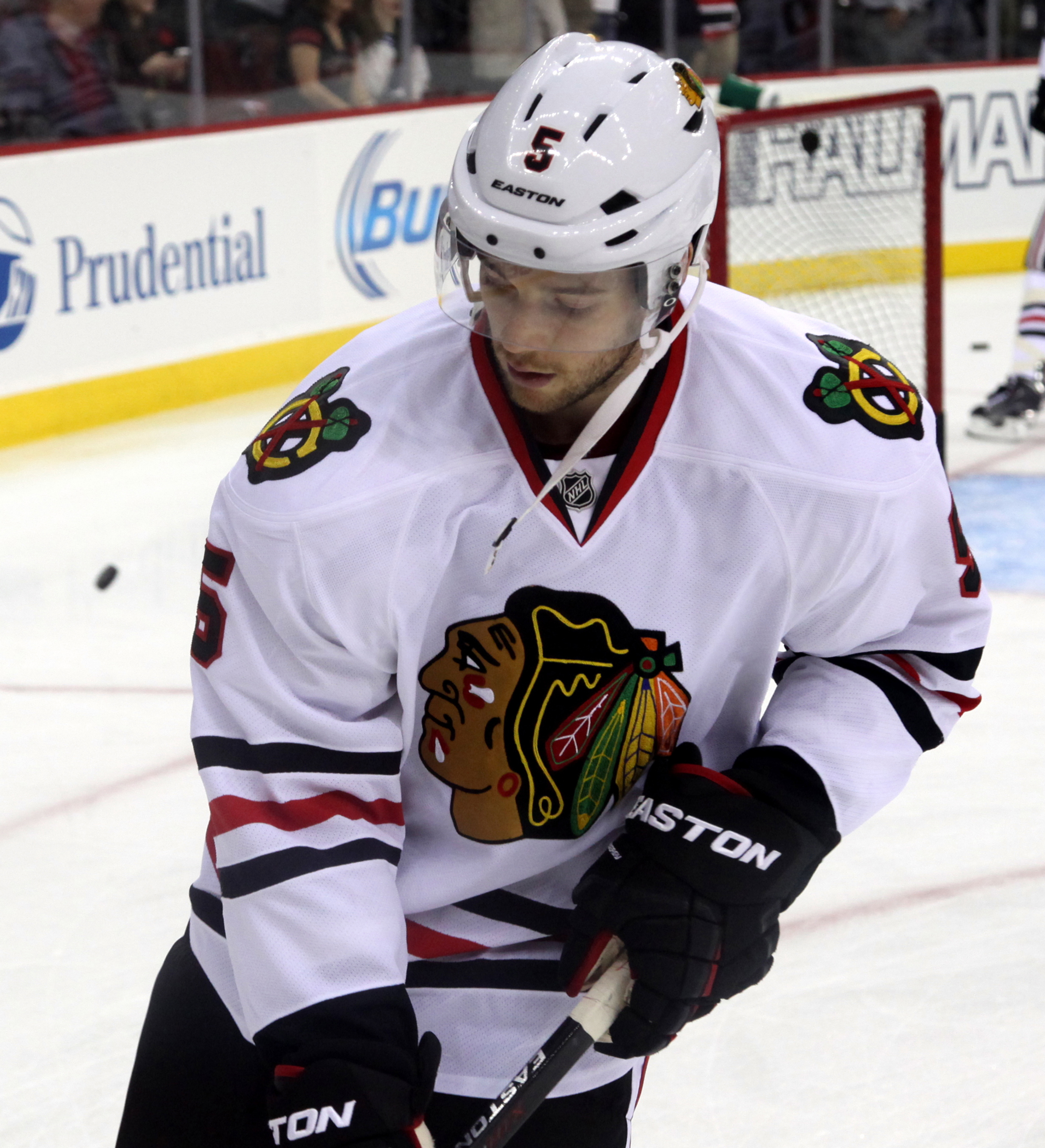
- Rundblad with the Chicago Blackhawks in December 2014
- Born: 8 October 1990 (age 36) Lycksele, Sweden
- Height: 6 ft 2 in (188 cm)
- Weight: 190 lb (86 kg; 13 st 8 lb)
- Position: Defence
- Shoots: Right
- team Former teams: Free agent Skellefteå AIK; Ottawa Senators; Phoenix Coyotes; Chicago Blackhawks; ZSC Lions; SKA Saint Petersburg; HC Sochi; Kärpät; MoDo Hockey
- National team: Sweden
- NHL draft: 17th overall, 2009; St. Louis Blues
- Playing career: 2007–present

David Rundblad (born 8 October 1990) is a Swedish professional ice hockey player who is currently an unrestricted free agent. He most recently played with MoDo Hockey in the HockeyAllsvenskan (Allsv). Rundblad was drafted 17th overall by the St. Louis Blues in the 2009 NHL entry draft. He began his NHL career with the Ottawa Senators before being traded to the Phoenix Coyotes. On 4 March 2014, he was traded to the Chicago Blackhawks. He won the Stanley Cup with the Blackhawks in 2015.

== Playing career ==
=== Professional ===
Rundblad scored his first Elitserien goal on 14 March 2009, in a playoff game against Linköping HC. NHL Central Scouting ranked Rundblad sixth among European skaters for the 2009 NHL entry draft, one spot behind Skellefteå AIK teammate Tim Erixon. The following season, Rundblad remained with Skellefteå and scored his first regular season goal on 30 January 2010 against Mattias Modig of Luleå HF, a goal that ended up being the game-winner.

On 10 June 2010, it was announced that Rundblad had signed an entry-level contract with St. Louis. On 25 June 2010, he was acquired by the Ottawa Senators in exchange for the 16th overall pick in 2010, which the Blues used to select Vladimir Tarasenko.

Rundblad finished the 2010–11 season with 50 points in 55 games, the second highest point total of any defenceman in Elitserien history, after David Petrasek, who had 53 points (in 52 games) in 2009–10.

Rundblad attended his first Senators camp in 2011, and remained on the roster into the season. Rundblad made his NHL debut on 11 October 2011, against the Minnesota Wild. Rundblad's first NHL point was an assist on a goal by Peter Regin on 15 October in a game against the Washington Capitals. His first NHL goal came on 27 November 2011, against Cam Ward of the Carolina Hurricanes.

On 17 December 2011, Rundblad was traded to the Phoenix Coyotes (along with a second-round draft pick) for forward Kyle Turris. Rundblad participated in the AHL All-Star Classic in Providence, Rhode Island, on January 28, 2013. He scored six goals and had 17 assists for 23 points in 32 games before the break. On 4 March 2014, Rundblad (along with defenceman Mathieu Brisebois) was traded to the Chicago Blackhawks in exchange for a second-round pick in 2014.

In 2015, Rundblad won the Stanley Cup with the Blackhawks, having played in 49 regular-season games and five playoff games, including two games in the Stanley Cup Final against the Tampa Bay Lightning.

In the 2015–16 season, Rundblad made the Blackhawks opening night roster primarily as the team's reserve defenseman. He provided two assists in nine games before he was placed on waivers and later reassigned to the Rockford IceHogs. Before playing with Rockford, on 3 January 2016, it was announced that Rundblad was loaned to the ZSC Lions of Switzerland's National League A for the remainder of the season. He later returned to the Blackhawks for their post-season matchup against the St. Louis Blues, appearing in three games in the seven-game first-round exit.

On 1 July 2016, Rundblad became a free agent after he was placed on waivers and bought out of the remaining year of his contract with the Blackhawks. He signed to return to the ZSC Lions of the Swiss top-flight National League A on September 2, 2016. After finishing his ZSC stint, he made the jump to the KHL, signing with SKA Saint Petersburg on 10 May 2017.

On 23 June 2022, Rundblad left the KHL following three seasons with Sochi and moved to the Finnish Liiga on a one-year contract with Kärpät.

== International play ==
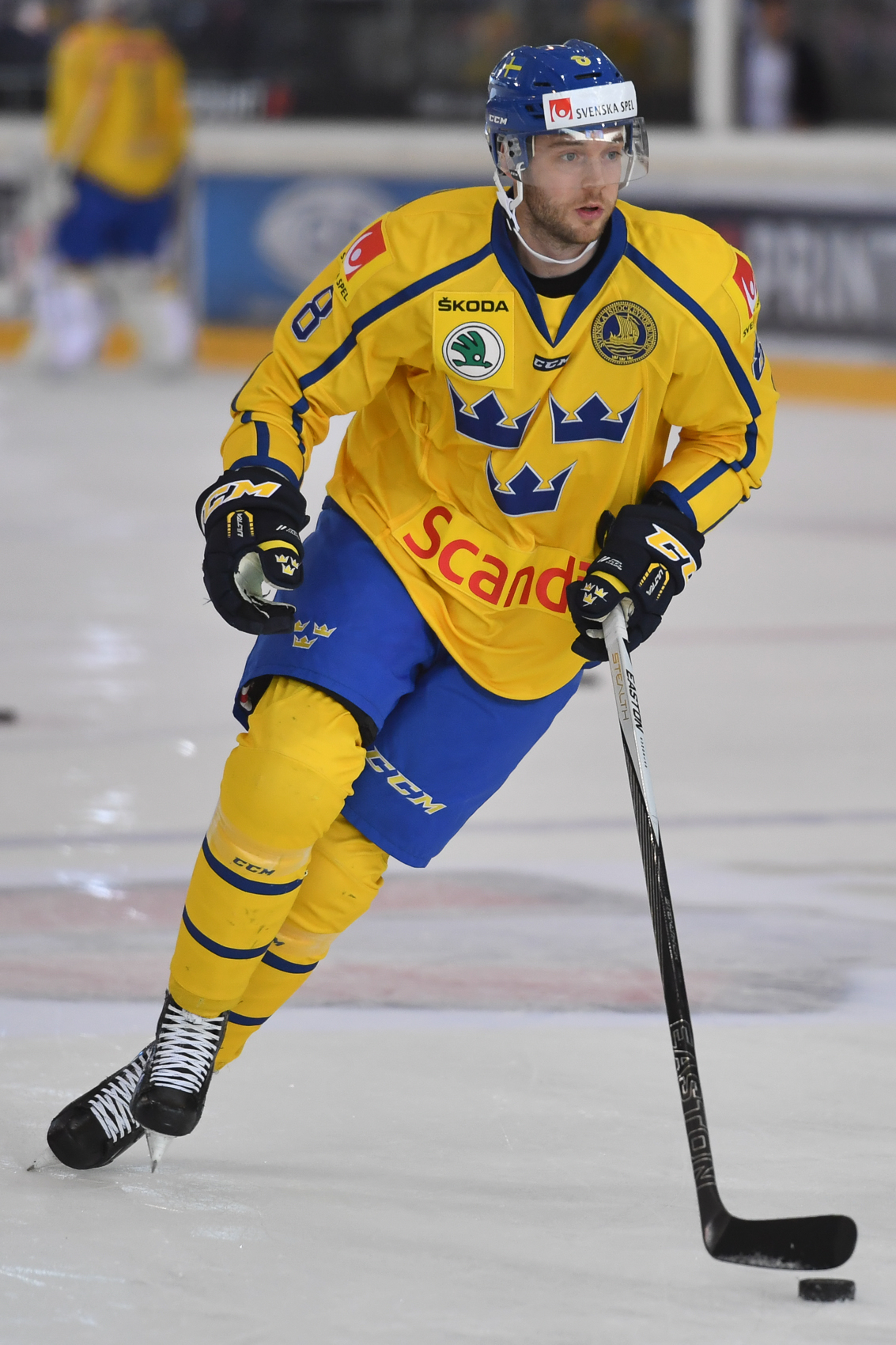

Medal record

Representing Sweden

Ice hockey

World Junior Championship
| Silver medal – second place | 2009 Canada | |
| Bronze medal – third place | 2010 Canada | |

World Championship
| Silver medal – second place | 2011 Slovakia | |

Rundblad represented Sweden at the 2009 World Junior Championships and 2010 World Junior Championships. During the 2010 tournament, Rundblad was an alternate captain for the Swedish team.

== Career statistics ==
=== Regular season and playoffs ===
| | | | Regular season | | | | | Playoffs |
| Season | Team | League | GP | G | A | Pts | PIM | GP | G | A | Pts | PIM |
|---|---|---|---|---|---|---|---|---|---|---|---|---|
| 2004–05 | Lycksele SK | Div.2 | 1 | 0 | 0 | 0 | 0 | — | — | — | — | — |
| 2005–06 | Lycksele SK | Div.2 | 11 | 5 | 2 | 7 | 2 | — | — | — | — | — |
| 2006–07 | Skellefteå AIK | J18 Allsv | 4 | 1 | 1 | 2 | 0 | — | — | — | — | — |
| 2006–07 | Skellefteå AIK | J20 | 14 | 3 | 4 | 7 | 12 | 2 | 0 | 0 | 0 | 2 |
| 2007–08 | Skellefteå AIK | J18 | 2 | 2 | 1 | 3 | 27 | — | — | — | — | — |
| 2007–08 | Skellefteå AIK | J18 Allsv | 2 | 1 | 1 | 2 | 2 | — | — | — | — | — |
| 2007–08 | Skellefteå AIK | J20 | 35 | 11 | 15 | 26 | 44 | 2 | 1 | 3 | 4 | 6 |
| 2007–08 | Skellefteå AIK | SEL | 6 | 0 | 0 | 0 | 2 | — | — | — | — | — |
| 2008–09 | Skellefteå AIK | J20 | 10 | 8 | 7 | 15 | 2 | — | — | — | — | — |
| 2008–09 | Skellefteå AIK | SEL | 45 | 0 | 10 | 10 | 8 | 10 | 1 | 1 | 2 | 2 |
| 2009–10 | Skellefteå AIK | J20 | 3 | 2 | 2 | 4 | 4 | — | — | — | — | — |
| 2009–10 | Skellefteå AIK | SEL | 47 | 1 | 12 | 13 | 14 | 12 | 0 | 1 | 1 | 2 |
| 2010–11 | Skellefteå AIK | SEL | 55 | 11 | 39 | 50 | 14 | 18 | 3 | 7 | 10 | 20 |
| 2011–12 | Ottawa Senators | NHL | 24 | 1 | 3 | 4 | 6 | — | — | — | — | — |
| 2011–12 | Phoenix Coyotes | NHL | 6 | 0 | 3 | 3 | 0 | — | — | — | — | — |
| 2011–12 | Portland Pirates | AHL | 30 | 7 | 9 | 16 | 27 | — | — | — | — | — |
| 2012–13 | Portland Pirates | AHL | 50 | 9 | 30 | 39 | 26 | 3 | 1 | 0 | 1 | 0 |
| 2012–13 | Phoenix Coyotes | NHL | 8 | 0 | 1 | 1 | 0 | — | — | — | — | — |
| 2013–14 | Phoenix Coyotes | NHL | 12 | 0 | 1 | 1 | 6 | — | — | — | — | — |
| 2013–14 | Portland Pirates | AHL | 6 | 0 | 4 | 4 | 0 | — | — | — | — | — |
| 2013–14 | Chicago Blackhawks | NHL | 5 | 0 | 0 | 0 | 0 | — | — | — | — | — |
| 2014–15 | Chicago Blackhawks | NHL | 49 | 3 | 11 | 14 | 12 | 5 | 0 | 0 | 0 | 0 |
| 2015–16 | Chicago Blackhawks | NHL | 9 | 0 | 2 | 2 | 6 | 3 | 0 | 0 | 0 | 4 |
| 2015–16 | ZSC Lions | NLA | 11 | 2 | 13 | 15 | 2 | 4 | 0 | 1 | 1 | 0 |
| 2015–16 | Rockford IceHogs | AHL | 10 | 2 | 2 | 4 | 0 | — | — | — | — | — |
| 2016–17 | ZSC Lions | NLA | 49 | 6 | 21 | 27 | 26 | 6 | 2 | 3 | 5 | 2 |
| 2017–18 | SKA Saint Petersburg | KHL | 39 | 2 | 9 | 11 | 6 | 2 | 0 | 0 | 0 | 0 |
| 2018–19 | SKA Saint Petersburg | KHL | 36 | 5 | 9 | 14 | 8 | 18 | 4 | 2 | 6 | 6 |
| 2019–20 | SKA Saint Petersburg | KHL | 25 | 2 | 6 | 8 | 10 | — | — | — | — | — |
| 2019–20 | HC Sochi | KHL | 19 | 1 | 7 | 8 | 6 | — | — | — | — | — |
| 2020–21 | HC Sochi | KHL | 52 | 3 | 13 | 16 | 26 | — | — | — | — | — |
| 2021–22 | HC Sochi | KHL | 42 | 2 | 4 | 6 | 31 | — | — | — | — | — |
| 2022–23 | Kärpät | Liiga | 60 | 6 | 20 | 26 | 18 | — | — | — | — | — |
| 2023–24 | MoDo Hockey | SHL | 52 | 2 | 10 | 12 | 6 | — | — | — | — | — |
| 2024–25 | MoDo Hockey | SHL | 47 | 3 | 17 | 20 | 16 | — | — | — | — | — |
| 2025–26 | MoDo Hockey | Allsv | 50 | 4 | 15 | 19 | 22 | 13 | 0 | 3 | 3 | 6 |
| SHL totals | | | 252 | 17 | 88 | 105 | 60 | 40 | 4 | 9 | 13 | 24 |
| NHL totals | | | 113 | 4 | 21 | 25 | 30 | 8 | 0 | 0 | 0 | 4 |
| KHL totals | | | 213 | 15 | 48 | 63 | 87 | 20 | 4 | 2 | 6 | 6 |

=== International ===
| Year | Team | Comp | GP | G | A | Pts | PIM |
|---|---|---|---|---|---|---|---|
| 2007 | Sweden | IH18 | 4 | 0 | 1 | 1 | 4 |
| 2008 | Sweden | U18 | 6 | 0 | 1 | 1 | 2 |
| 2009 | Sweden | WJC | 6 | 1 | 1 | 2 | 0 |
| 2010 | Sweden | WJC | 6 | 1 | 4 | 5 | 2 |
| 2011 | Sweden | WC | 4 | 0 | 1 | 1 | 2 |
| Junior totals | | | 22 | 2 | 7 | 9 | 8 |
| Senior totals | | | 4 | 0 | 1 | 1 | 2 |

Awards and achievements
| Preceded by Alex Pietrangelo | St. Louis Blues first-round draft pick 2009 | Succeeded by Jaden Schwartz |
