= Tim Erixon =

American-born Swedish ice hockey player

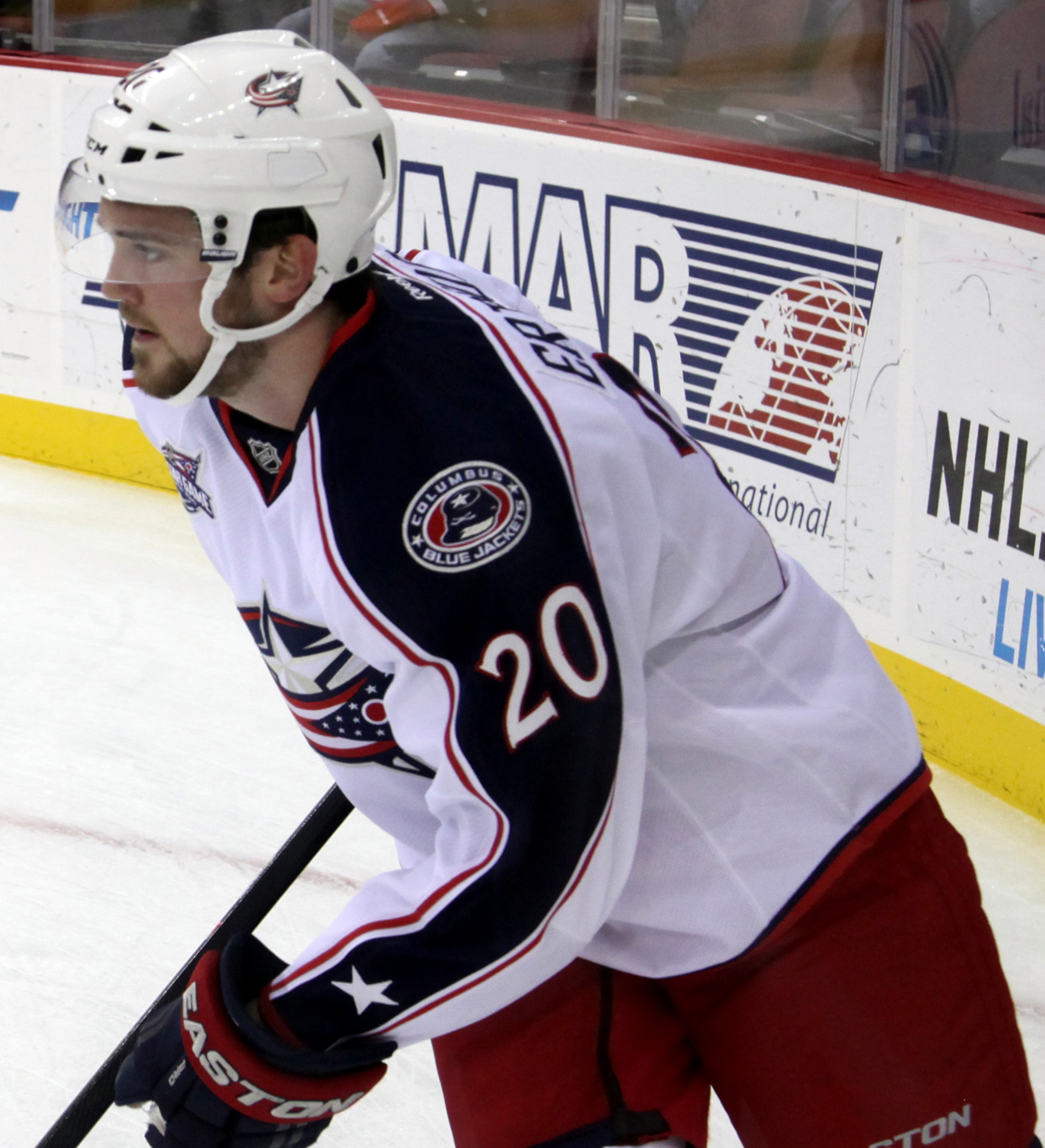
- Erixon with the Columbus Blue Jackets in 2014
- Born: 24 February 1991 (age 35) Port Chester, New York, U.S.
- Height: 6 ft 3 in (191 cm)
- Weight: 205 lb (93 kg; 14 st 9 lb)
- Position: Defense
- Shoots: Left
- SHL team Former teams: Timrå IK; Skellefteå AIK; New York Rangers; Columbus Blue Jackets; Chicago Blackhawks; Toronto Maple Leafs; Växjö Lakers
- National team: Sweden
- NHL draft: 23rd overall, 2009; Calgary Flames
- Playing career: 2007–present

Tim Carl Erixon (born 24 February 1991) is an American-born Swedish professional ice hockey defenseman who is currently playing with Timrå IK in the Swedish Hockey League (SHL). Erixon was selected in the first round—23rd overall—by the Calgary Flames in the 2009 NHL entry draft. Erixon has previously played for Skellefteå AIK in the Elitserien, as well as various NHL teams. As the son of former NHL player Jan Erixon, he has represented Sweden at the World Junior Hockey Championships, winning a silver medal in 2009.

== Early life ==
Erixon was born in Port Chester, New York, while his father Jan was a player for the New York Rangers. His family moved back to Skellefteå, Sweden, following his father's retirement, where he began to play hockey himself at the age of five. He is described by his father as a "two-way defenceman with offensive skills". Though he plays a different position, Erixon's play has been compared to that of his father, who was known as a defensive forward.

== Playing career ==
=== Amateur ===
Erixon began his professional career with Skellefteå AIK of the Swedish Elitserien at the age of 17, playing alongside good friend, and fellow 2009 draftee David Rundblad. He recorded seven points in 45 games with Skellefteå in 2008–09 before finishing the season on loan to the Malmö Redhawks in the Swedish second division, HockeyAllsvenskan.

=== Professional ===
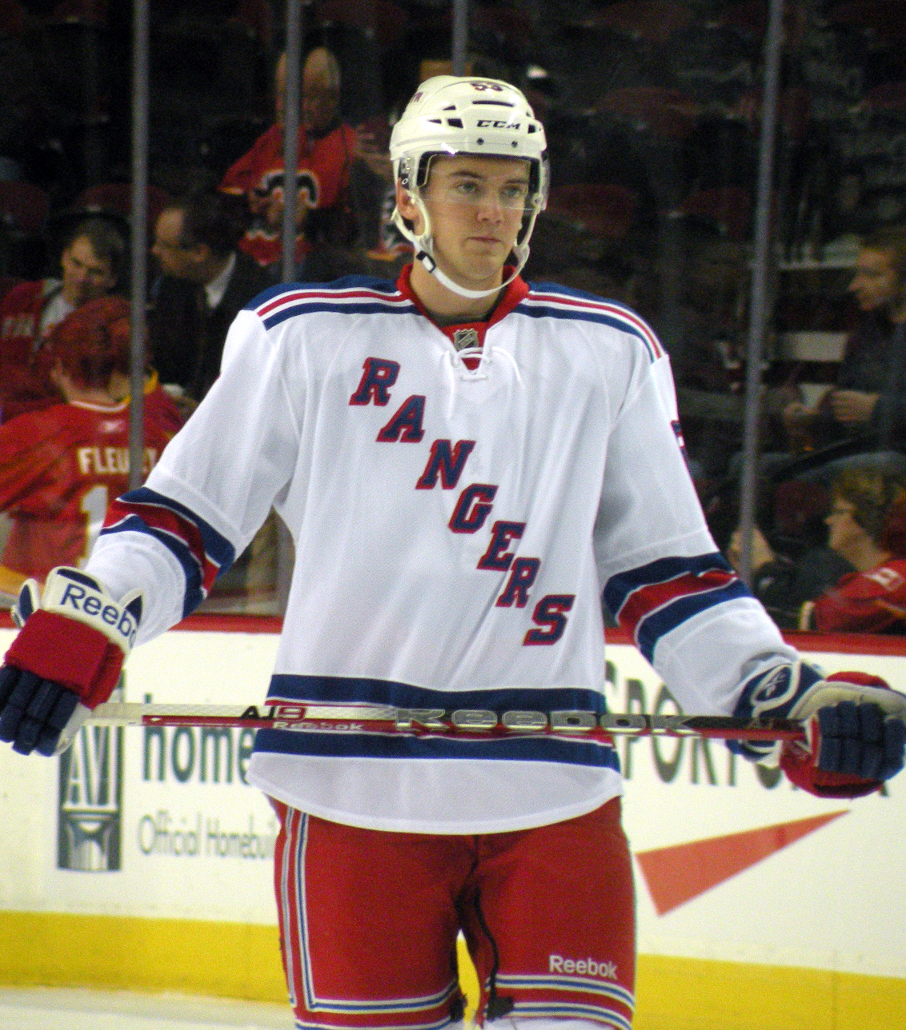
Erixon as a Ranger in October 2011

Erixon entered the 2009 NHL Entry Draft as the 5th ranked European skater according to the NHL Central Scouting Bureau. He was selected in the first round—23rd overall—by the Calgary Flames. The Flames considered him a well-rounded player; not expected to be an offensive minded defenseman, but a player with a good vision on the ice.

Erixon, however, refused to sign with Calgary because he felt he would not make the roster. Faced with the prospect of losing his rights before the 2011 NHL Entry Draft, Flames' general manager Jay Feaster traded Erixon to the New York Rangers on 1 June 2011, in exchange for two 2011 second round draft picks (the Flames selected Markus Granlund and Tyler Wotherspoon) and prospect Roman Horák. He made his NHL debut on 7 October 2011 against the Los Angeles Kings in a game played in Sweden. He was sent to the AHL Connecticut Whale after playing nine games for the Rangers. He was recalled to the Rangers on 14 December 2011 after scoring 1 goal and 11 assists in 13 games for the Whale, and since shuttled between New York and Connecticut several times. He registered his first NHL point for the Rangers on 23 March 2012, assisting on a goal by Brian Boyle in a game against the Buffalo Sabres.

After Connecticut was eliminated from the AHL playoffs, Erixon was added to the Rangers' playoff roster. On 23 June 2012, Erixon, along with Brandon Dubinsky, Artem Anisimov, and a first round selection in the 2013 NHL entry draft were traded to the Columbus Blue Jackets for Rick Nash, Steven Delisle, and a 2013 conditional third round pick.

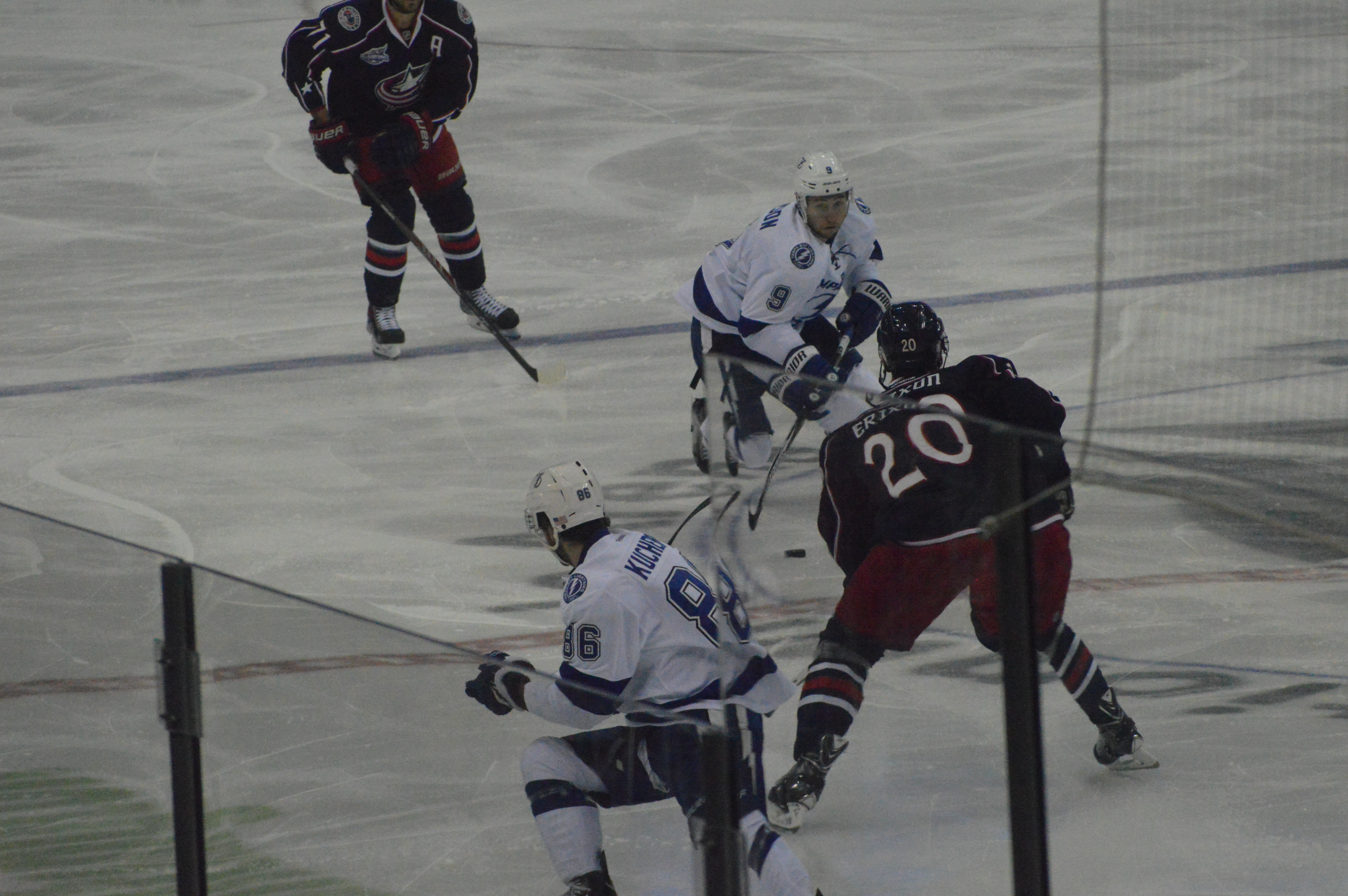
Erixon (middle) skating against Nikita Kucherov and Tyler Johnson in November 2014.

In the 2014–15 season, Erixon made the Blue Jackets opening-night roster. On 26 October 2014, Erixon scored his first NHL goal against the Los Angeles Kings. After 19 games with Columbus, Erixon was traded to the Chicago Blackhawks for forward Jeremy Morin on 14 December 2014. Erixon featured in 8 games with the Blackhawks, before he was placed on waivers and claimed by the Toronto Maple Leafs on 1 March 2015.

On 1 July 2015, Erixon was part of a blockbuster trade that also sent Phil Kessel and Tyler Biggs to the Pittsburgh Penguins in exchange for Kasperi Kapanen, Scott Harrington, Nick Spaling, Pittsburgh's 2016 3rd round draft pick, and a conditional exchange of draft picks between the clubs depending on Pittsburgh's 2016 NHL regular season performance.

On 7 September 2017, the New Jersey Devils signed Erixon as a free agent to a professional try-out contract. After participating in training camp and the pre-season, Erixon was released without a contract from the Devils on 26 September 2017. He was then invited to try-out with the Devils AHL affiliate in Binghamton. After a successful training camp, Erixon signed a professional try-out to begin the 2017–18 season with Binghamton on 5 October 2017. Erixon contributed with 1 assist in 5 games with the Devils before he was released from his PTO to sign a one-year AHL contract with the Springfield Thunderbirds on 1 November 2017.

In the following off-season, Erixon as a free agent returned to the Wilkes-Barre/Scranton organization, agreeing to attend training camp on a professional try-out on September 26, 2018. He made the opening night roster for the 2018–19 season, and played through 15 games before securing a one-year AHL contract with the Penguins on February 5, 2019.

On June 15, 2019, Erixon returned to Sweden as a free agent following 8 seasons in North America, agreeing to a two-year contract with the Växjö Lakers of the SHL.

== International play ==
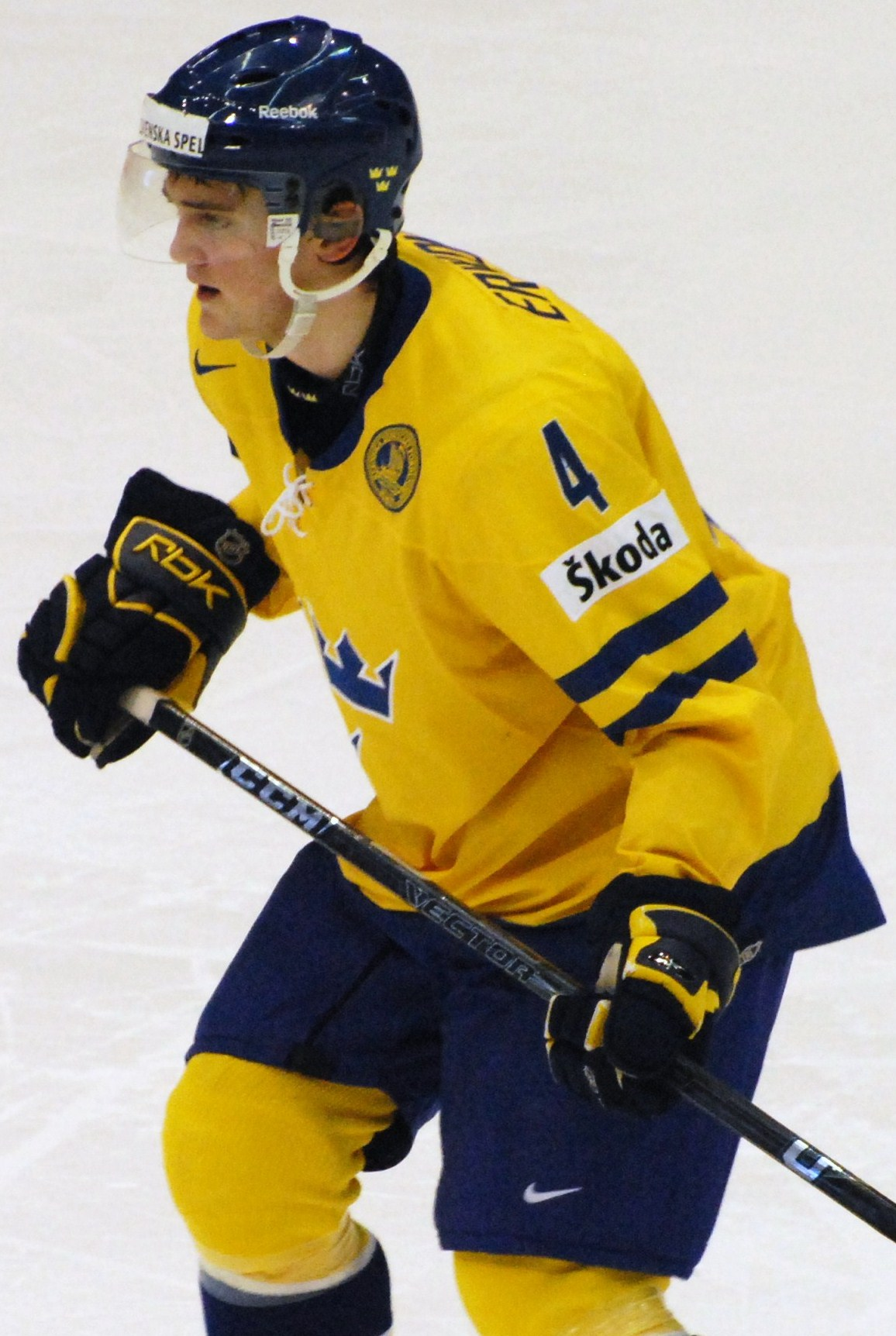

Medal record

Representing Sweden

Men's ice hockey

World Junior Championship
Silver medal – second place	2009 Canada	
Bronze medal – third place	2010 Canada	

World Championships
Silver medal – second place	2011 Slovakia	
Bronze medal – third place	2014 Belarus	

Erixon represented Sweden at the 2009 IIHF World U18 Championships and 2009 World Junior Ice Hockey Championships, winning a silver medal in the latter tournament.

== Career statistics ==
=== Regular season and playoffs ===
			Regular season					Playoffs
Season	Team	League	GP	G	A	Pts	PIM	GP	G	A	Pts	PIM
2005–06	Skellefteå AIK	J18 Allsv	9	0	2	2	4	—	—	—	—	—
2006–07	Skellefteå AIK	J18 Allsv	8	2	2	4	20	—	—	—	—	—
2006–07	Skellefteå AIK	J20	8	0	2	2	2	2	0	0	0	4
2007–08	Skellefteå AIK	J18	2	0	1	1	10	—	—	—	—	—
2007–08	Skellefteå AIK	J18 Allsv	2	0	0	0	0	—	—	—	—	—
2007–08	Skellefteå AIK	J20	28	3	11	14	78	1	0	1	1	4
2007–08	Skellefteå AIK	SEL	2	0	0	0	0	—	—	—	—	—
2008–09	Skellefteå AIK	J18	1	0	2	2	10	—	—	—	—	—
2008–09	Skellefteå AIK	J18 Allsv	—	—	—	—	—	5	1	5	6	14
2008–09	Skellefteå AIK	J20	9	2	12	14	10	5	1	2	3	4
2008–09	Skellefteå AIK	SEL	45	2	5	7	12	9	0	0	0	4
2008–09	Malmö Redhawks	Allsv	3	0	2	2	0	—	—	—	—	—
2009–10	Skellefteå AIK	SEL	45	7	6	13	44	12	1	0	1	8
2010–11	Skellefteå AIK	SEL	48	5	19	24	40	18	3	5	8	12
2011–12	New York Rangers	NHL	18	0	2	2	8	—	—	—	—	—
2011–12	Connecticut Whale	AHL	52	3	30	33	42	9	0	4	4	8
2012–13	Springfield Falcons	AHL	40	5	24	29	38	—	—	—	—	—
2012–13	Columbus Blue Jackets	NHL	31	0	5	5	14	—	—	—	—	—
2013–14	Springfield Falcons	AHL	39	5	32	37	16	5	1	1	2	4
2013–14	Columbus Blue Jackets	NHL	2	0	0	0	2	—	—	—	—	—
2014–15	Columbus Blue Jackets	NHL	19	1	5	6	4	—	—	—	—	—
2014–15	Chicago Blackhawks	NHL	8	0	0	0	4	—	—	—	—	—
2014–15	Toronto Maple Leafs	NHL	15	1	0	1	6	—	—	—	—	—
2015–16	Wilkes-Barre/Scranton Penguins	AHL	65	3	17	20	44	10	2	4	6	6
2016–17	Wilkes-Barre/Scranton Penguins	AHL	54	4	13	17	24	5	1	1	2	4
2017–18	Binghamton Devils	AHL	5	0	1	1	4	—	—	—	—	—
2017–18	Springfield Thunderbirds	AHL	47	2	20	22	40	—	—	—	—	—
2018–19	Wilkes-Barre/Scranton Penguins	AHL	28	0	5	5	18	—	—	—	—	—
2019–20	Växjö Lakers	SHL	48	0	11	11	32	—	—	—	—	—
2020–21	Växjö Lakers	SHL	48	2	6	8	51	14	0	2	2	43
2021–22	Timrå IK	SHL	47	2	2	4	55	—	—	—	—	—
2022–23	Timrå IK	SHL	51	1	11	12	54	6	0	0	0	0
2023–24	Timrå IK	SHL	39	2	8	10	8	2	0	0	0	0
2024–25	Timrå IK	SHL	6	0	1	1	4	—	—	—	—	—
SHL totals			379	21	69	90	312	57	4	7	11	67
NHL totals			93	2	12	14	38	—	—	—	—	—

=== International ===
Year	Team	Event	Result	GP	G	A	Pts	PIM
2007	Sweden	IH18	1st place, gold medalist(s)	4	0	1	1	2
2009	Sweden	U18	5th	6	3	6	9	12
2009	Sweden	WJC	2nd place, silver medalist(s)	5	0	0	0	0
2010	Sweden	WJC	3rd place, bronze medalist(s)	5	1	2	3	10
2011	Sweden	WC	2nd place, silver medalist(s)	9	0	1	1	2
2014	Sweden	WC	3rd place, bronze medalist(s)	10	0	2	2	10
Junior totals				20	4	9	13	24
Senior totals				19	0	3	3	12

== Awards and honors ==
Award	Year
AHL
All-Star Game	2013
International
IIHF World U18 Championships First Team All-Star	2009

Awards and achievements
Preceded by Greg Nemisz	Calgary Flames first-round draft pick 2009	Succeeded by Sven Bärtschi
