= Klas Dahlbeck =

Swedish ice hockey player (born 1991)

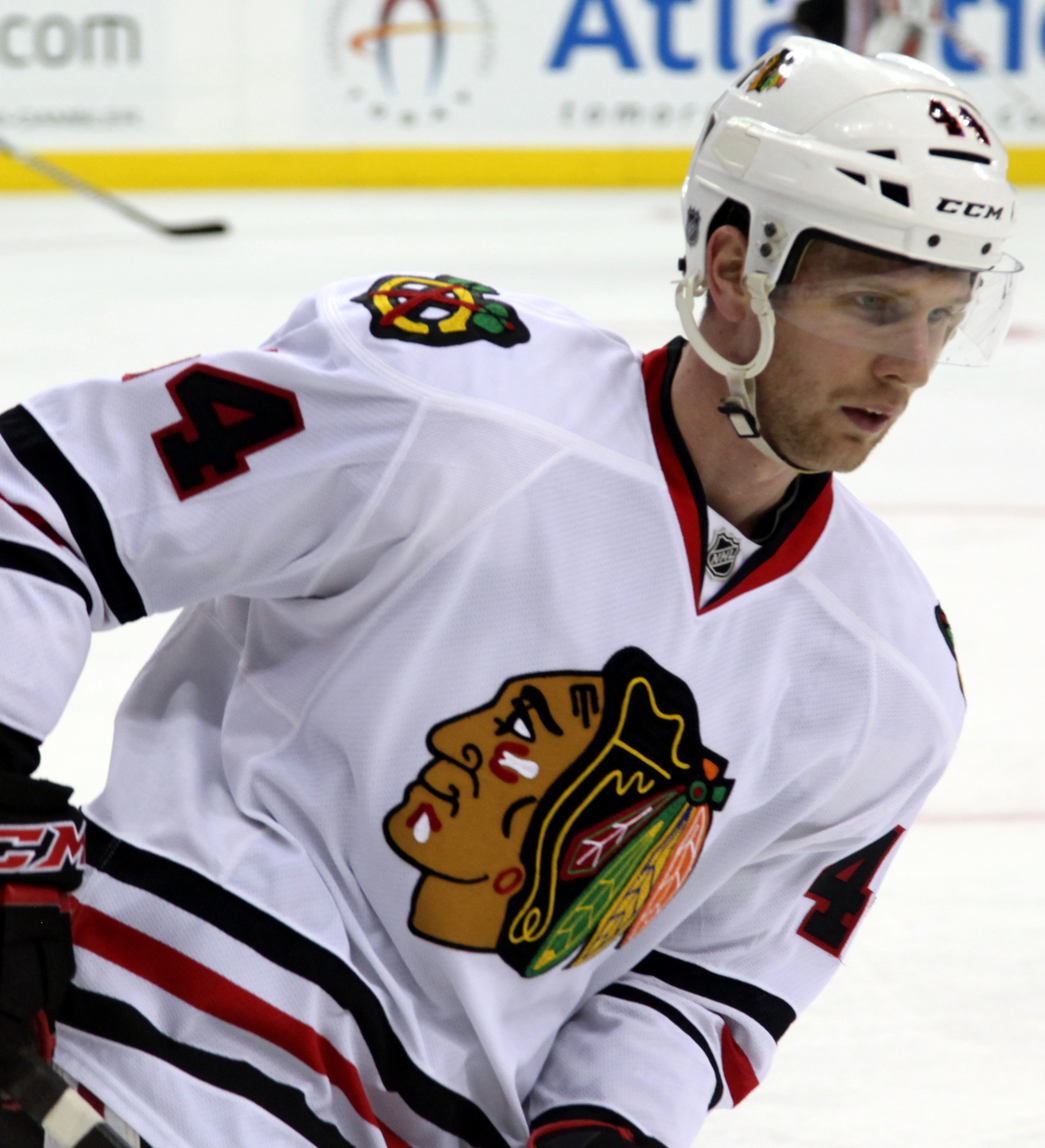
- Dahlbeck with the Chicago Blackhawks in December 2014
- Born: 6 July 1991 (age 35) Katrineholm, Sweden
- Height: 6 ft 3 in (191 cm)
- Weight: 207 lb (94 kg; 14 st 11 lb)
- Position: Defence
- Shoots: Left
- NL team Former teams: HC Davos; Linköpings HC; Chicago Blackhawks; Arizona Coyotes; Carolina Hurricanes; CSKA Moscow
- National team: Sweden
- NHL draft: 79th overall, 2011; Chicago Blackhawks
- Playing career: 2009–present

Klas Dahlbeck (born 6 July 1991) is a Swedish professional ice hockey player who is currently playing with HC Davos of the National League (NL). He was selected by the Chicago Blackhawks in the 3rd round (79th overall) of the 2011 NHL entry draft.

== Playing career ==
Dahlbeck made his professional debut in the Swedish Hockey League, with Linköpings HC in the 2009–10 season. After two more seasons in Sweden on 29 May 2012, Dahlbeck signed a three-year entry-level contract with the Blackhawks.

Dahlbeck endured his first two North American seasons with AHL affiliate, the Rockford IceHogs, establishing himself as the franchise career leader in plus/minus before in the 2014–15 season he made his NHL debut with the Blackhawks on 6 December 2014 against the Nashville Predators. He scored his first NHL goal on 11 December against Tuukka Rask of the Boston Bruins. On 28 February 2015, Dahlbeck was traded, along with Chicago's first round draft pick in 2015, to the Arizona Coyotes in exchange for Antoine Vermette.

On the eve of the 2016–17 season, Dahlbeck's tenure with the Coyotes came to a close as he was claimed off waivers by the Carolina Hurricanes on 11 October 2016.

After a year with the Carolina Hurricanes in which he played 43 games, he was re-signed to a one-year, $850,000 deal with the Hurricanes for 2017–18 on 21 April 2017. During the season he skated in 33 games for the Hurricanes, contributing with 1 goal and 5 points.

On 22 May 2018, the Hurricanes General Manager Don Waddell confirmed that Dahlbeck had left for KHL, agreeing to a one-year deal with CSKA Moscow.

Following the 2021–22 season, having claimed his second Gagarin Cup with CSKA during his four year tenure in the KHL, Dalhbeck opted to leave Russia as a free agent and was signed to a two-year contract with Swiss club, HC Davos of the NL, on 3 May 2022.

== Career statistics ==
=== Regular season and playoffs ===
			Regular season					Playoffs
Season	Team	League	GP	G	A	Pts	PIM	GP	G	A	Pts	PIM
2007–08	Växjö Lakers	SWE.2 U18	16	7	10	17	4	—	—	—	—	—
2007–08	Växjö Lakers	SWE.2 U20	22	3	4	7	14	—	—	—	—	—
2008–09	Växjö Lakers	J18	14	4	5	9	6	—	—	—	—	—
2008–09	Växjö Lakers	SWE.2 U20	15	4	6	10	8	—	—	—	—	—
2008–09	Gislaveds SK	SWE.3	5	1	1	2	2	—	—	—	—	—
2009–10	Linköpings HC	J20	39	4	7	11	8	6	1	1	2	4
2009–10	Linköpings HC	SEL	6	0	0	0	0	3	0	0	0	0
2009–10	Mjölby HC	SWE.3	2	0	0	0	0	—	—	—	—	—
2010–11	Linköpings HC	SEL	47	0	8	8	12	7	0	0	0	0
2011–12	Linköpings HC	SEL	55	2	2	4	20	—	—	—	—	—
2012–13	Rockford IceHogs	AHL	70	1	5	6	29	—	—	—	—	—
2013–14	Rockford IceHogs	AHL	75	10	25	35	49	—	—	—	—	—
2014–15	Rockford IceHogs	AHL	49	4	6	10	35	—	—	—	—	—
2014–15	Chicago Blackhawks	NHL	4	1	0	1	2	—	—	—	—	—
2014–15	Portland Pirates	AHL	3	0	1	1	0	5	0	1	1	4
2014–15	Arizona Coyotes	NHL	19	0	3	3	6	—	—	—	—	—
2015–16	Arizona Coyotes	NHL	71	2	6	8	28	—	—	—	—	—
2016–17	Carolina Hurricanes	NHL	43	2	4	6	30	—	—	—	—	—
2016–17	Charlotte Checkers	AHL	6	0	1	1	0	—	—	—	—	—
2017–18	Carolina Hurricanes	NHL	33	1	4	5	21	—	—	—	—	—
2018–19	CSKA Moscow	KHL	55	2	9	11	22	20	0	2	2	14
2019–20	CSKA Moscow	KHL	52	1	6	7	22	3	0	1	1	5
2020–21	CSKA Moscow	KHL	53	2	12	14	41	23	1	0	1	4
2021–22	CSKA Moscow	KHL	38	3	2	5	14	22	1	4	5	10
NHL totals			170	6	17	23	87	—	—	—	—	—
KHL totals			198	8	29	37	99	68	2	7	9	33

=== International ===
Year	Team	Event	Result	GP	G	A	Pts	PIM
2011	Sweden	WJC	4th	6	0	2	2	2
2021	Sweden	WC	9th	7	0	1	1	4
Junior totals				6	0	2	2	2
Senior totals				7	0	1	1	4

== Awards and honors ==
Award	Year
KHL
Gagarin Cup (CSKA Moscow)	2019, 2022
