= Karri Rämö =

Finnish ice hockey player (born 1986)

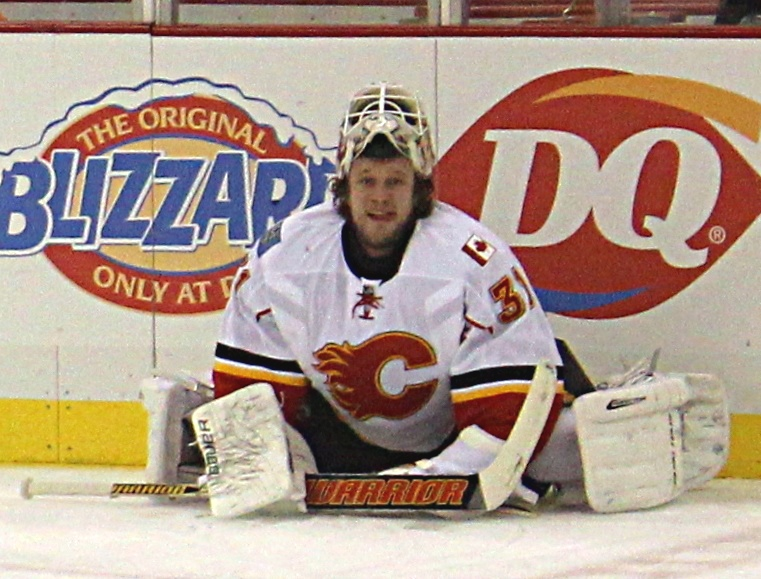
- Ramo warming up with the Flames
- Born: July 1, 1986 (age 40) Asikkala, Finland
- Height: 6 ft 3 in (191 cm)
- Weight: 215 lb (98 kg; 15 st 5 lb)
- Position: Goaltender
- Caught: Left
- team Former teams: Free Agent; Lahti Pelicans; HPK; Tampa Bay Lightning; Avangard Omsk; Calgary Flames; Jokerit; Djurgårdens IF; HC TPS; ERC Ingolstadt
- National team: Finland
- NHL draft: 191st overall, 2004; Tampa Bay Lightning
- Playing career: 2003–2022

Karri Rämö (born July 1, 1986) is a Finnish former professional ice hockey goaltender. He began his professional career in the SM-Liiga, initially with the Lahti Pelicans and then HPK, where he was a member of the Kanada-malja championship team in 2005–06. The Tampa Bay Lightning, having selected Rämö in the sixth round, 191st overall, at the 2004 NHL entry draft, gave him a contract, and he played 48 games with the team over three seasons between 2006 and 2009, before returning to play in Europe.

In four KHL seasons with Avangard Omsk, Rämö was twice selected to participate in the KHL All-Star Game. He returned to the NHL ahead of the 2013–14 season, joining the Calgary Flames, and played in 111 games over three seasons from 2013 until 2016. He returned to the KHL following that, and he then also played for Djurgårdens IF of the Swedish Hockey League (SHL), before signing to ERC Ingolstadt in Germany.

== Playing career ==
Rämö was drafted by the Tampa Bay Lightning in the sixth round, 191st overall, of the 2004 NHL entry draft. A product of the Pelicans organization based in Heinola, Rämö made his SM-liiga debut in the 2003–04 season with Pelicans after the team had lost their chance at the playoffs. In the next season, he played 26 games with Pelicans, later signing a contract with HPK for the 2005–06 season. During the campaign, Rämö shared goaltending duties with Miika Wiikman, putting up excellent statistics and en route to the team's SM-liiga championship. Rämö also represented the Finland junior team at the 2006 World Junior Ice Hockey Championships as the back-up goaltender to Tuukka Rask.

After HPK's championship victory, Rämö signed a two-way contract with Tampa Bay. Playing in the American Hockey League (AHL) with the Norfolk Admirals, Tampa's top minor league affiliate, he made his NHL debut on 2 December 2007 against the Ottawa Senators, replacing Johan Holmqvist. On 19 December, Rämö was again called up by the Lightning. The next day, he won his first career NHL start in a game against the Toronto Maple Leafs, which finished 2–1. He went on to record 7 wins and 11 losses in the 2007–08 season.

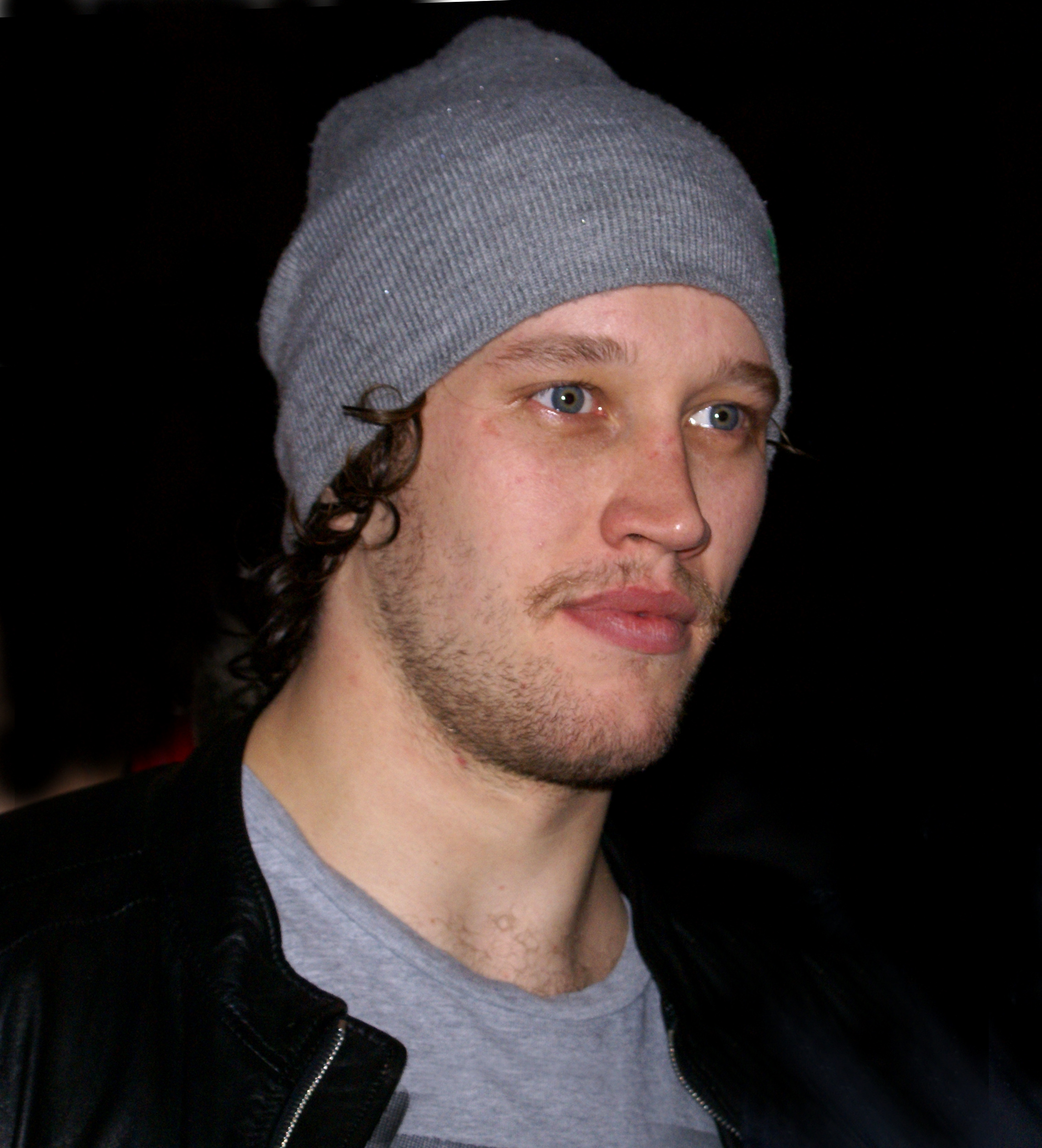
Rämö after a game with Avangard Omsk in 2011.

After the Lightning signed NHL veteran Olaf Kölzig as the backup goaltender to Mike Smith, Rämö began the 2008–09 season with Norfolk. He was recalled multiple times by the Lightning throughout the season and finished the year playing 24 games, though he posted just 4 wins.

With the prospect of another return to the AHL for the 2009–10 season, on 23 June 2009, Rämö signed a two-year contract with Russian team Avangard Omsk of the Kontinental Hockey League (KHL).

On 16 August 2010, Rämö's NHL playing rights were traded to the Montreal Canadiens in exchange for goaltender Cédrick Desjardins.

In January 2011, Rämö, for the second consecutive year, was selected to be the starting goaltender for the Eastern Conference in the KHL All-Star Game, collecting more fan votes than any other player in the league. However, he was unable to participate due to an injury.

On 12 January 2012, Rämö was traded (along with Michael Cammalleri and a fifth-round pick in the 2012 NHL entry draft) to the Calgary Flames in exchange for Rene Bourque, Patrick Holland and a second-round pick in the 2013 NHL entry draft. On 5 July 2013, Rämö signed a two-year, $5.8 million contract with Calgary, paving the way for his return to the NHL. Ahead of the 2013–14 season, during the pre-season, he won the job to replace the retired Miikka Kiprusoff as Calgary's starting goaltender over Joey MacDonald and Reto Berra.

Rämö recorded a 15–9–3 record during the 2014–15 season, splitting duties with the newly acquired Jonas Hiller, though Hiller started more games and also started in the 2015 Stanley Cup playoffs. Rämö was not called into action by the Flames until he replaced Hiller early in Calgary's Game 6-clinching Western Conference Quarterfinals victory over the Vancouver Canucks. After Hiller's sub-par performance in Game 1 of the subsequent Conference Semifinals against the Anaheim Ducks, Rämö would start the remainder of Calgary's playoff games, though the Flames eventually lost the series in five games. He finished the playoffs with a 2–3 record and a 2.86 goals against average (GAA).

On 1 July 2015, Rämö signed a new one-year contract with Calgary reportedly worth $3.8 million. He struggled early in the season and was sent down to the AHL. However, after being called up after an injury to Hiller, Rämö played most of Calgary's games until a serious knee injury suffered in a game against the San Jose Sharks ended his season.

Having returned to health, as a free agent into the 2016–17 season, Rämö signed a professional try-out (PTO) contract with the AHL's Toronto Marlies on 6 December 2016. On 7 February 2017, having played three games with the Marlies in which he remained winless, he was released from his PTO contract and returned to Finland to continue his recovery to full health.

In the 2018-19 season, Rämö was contracted for a second stint with Russian club, Avangard Omsk of the KHL, however injury ruled him out for the entirety of the season without featuring for the club.

As a free agent in the 2019–20 season, Rämö signalled his return to health in agreeing to a one-year contract with Swedish club, Djurgårdens IF of the SHL on 4 October 2019. Signed as an injury replacement, he agreed to an initial break of contract after six weeks if his injuries re-occur.

== Career statistics ==
=== Regular season and playoffs ===
			Regular season										Playoffs
Season	Team	League	GP	W	L	T	OTL	MIN	GA	SO	GAA	SV%	GP	W	L	MIN	GA	SO	GAA	SV%
2003–04	Pelicans	SM-l	3	0	2	0	—	138	10	0	4.34	.861	—	—	—	—	—	—	—	—
2004–05	Pelicans	SM-l	26	4	12	4	—	1267	84	1	3.98	.898	—	—	—	—	—	—	—	—
2005–06	HPK	SM-l	24	7	8	—	7	1359	49	2	2.16	.929	3	2	1	204	5	1	1.46	.947
2006–07	Springfield Falcons	AHL	45	15	24	—	1	2432	127	1	3.13	.906	—	—	—	—	—	—	—	—
2006–07	Tampa Bay Lightning	NHL	2	0	0	—	0	70	4	0	3.43	.826	—	—	—	—	—	—	—	—
2007–08	Norfolk Admirals	AHL	6	2	4	—	0	342	19	0	3.33	.898	—	—	—	—	—	—	—	—
2007–08	Tampa Bay Lightning	NHL	22	7	11	—	3	1269	64	0	3.03	.899	—	—	—	—	—	—	—	—
2008–09	Norfolk Admirals	AHL	26	7	14	—	4	1507	95	0	3.78	.884	—	—	—	—	—	—	—	—
2008–09	Tampa Bay Lightning	NHL	24	4	10	—	7	1312	80	0	3.66	.894	—	—	—	—	—	—	—	—
2009–10	Avangard Omsk	KHL	44	21	17	—	4	2582	91	4	2.11	.913	3	0	3	158	8	0	3.04	.886
2010–11	Avangard Omsk	KHL	44	33	5	—	4	2592	85	5	1.97	.925	14	6	7	891	32	1	2.16	.914
2011–12	Avangard Omsk	KHL	45	19	17	—	9	2666	87	5	1.96	.925	21	14	6	1209	31	3	1.54	.940
2012–13	Avangard Omsk	KHL	40	26	9	—	5	2401	80	4	2.00	.929	12	5	7	725	24	3	1.99	.917
2013–14	Calgary Flames	NHL	40	17	15	—	4	2194	97	2	2.65	.911	—	—	—	—	—	—	—	—
2014–15	Calgary Flames	NHL	34	15	9	—	3	1732	75	2	2.60	.912	7	2	3	336	16	0	2.86	.906
2015–16	Calgary Flames	NHL	37	17	18	—	1	2134	94	1	2.63	.909	—	—	—	—	—	—	—	—
2015–16	Stockton Heat	AHL	1	0	0	—	0	20	0	0	0.00	1.000	—	—	—	—	—	—	—	—
2016–17	Toronto Marlies	AHL	3	0	3	—	0	174	11	0	3.80	.880	—	—	—	—	—	—	—	—
2016–17	Pelicans	Liiga	7	1	1	—	5	436	17	0	2.34	.919	—	—	—	—	—	—	—	—
2017–18	Jokerit	KHL	18	7	9	—	1	1021	33	1	1.94	.930	6	4	2	457	10	0	1.31	.954
2019–20	Djurgårdens IF	SHL	18	7	8	—	0	990	46	1	2.79	.888	—	—	—	—	—	—	—	—
2020–21	TPS	Liiga	11	5	5	—	1	621	28	1	2.71	.888	7	4	3	—	—	1	1.96	.929
2021–22	ERC Ingolstadt	DEL	11	3	8	—	0	654	34	0	3.12	.856	—	—	—	—	—	—	—	—
KHL totals			191	106	58	—	23	11,264	376	18	2.00	.924	54	29	25	3,440	105	7	1.61	.930
NHL totals			159	60	63	—	18	8,721	414	5	2.85	.906	7	2	3	336	16	0	2.86	.906
