= Matt Beleskey =

Canadian ice hockey player (born 1988)

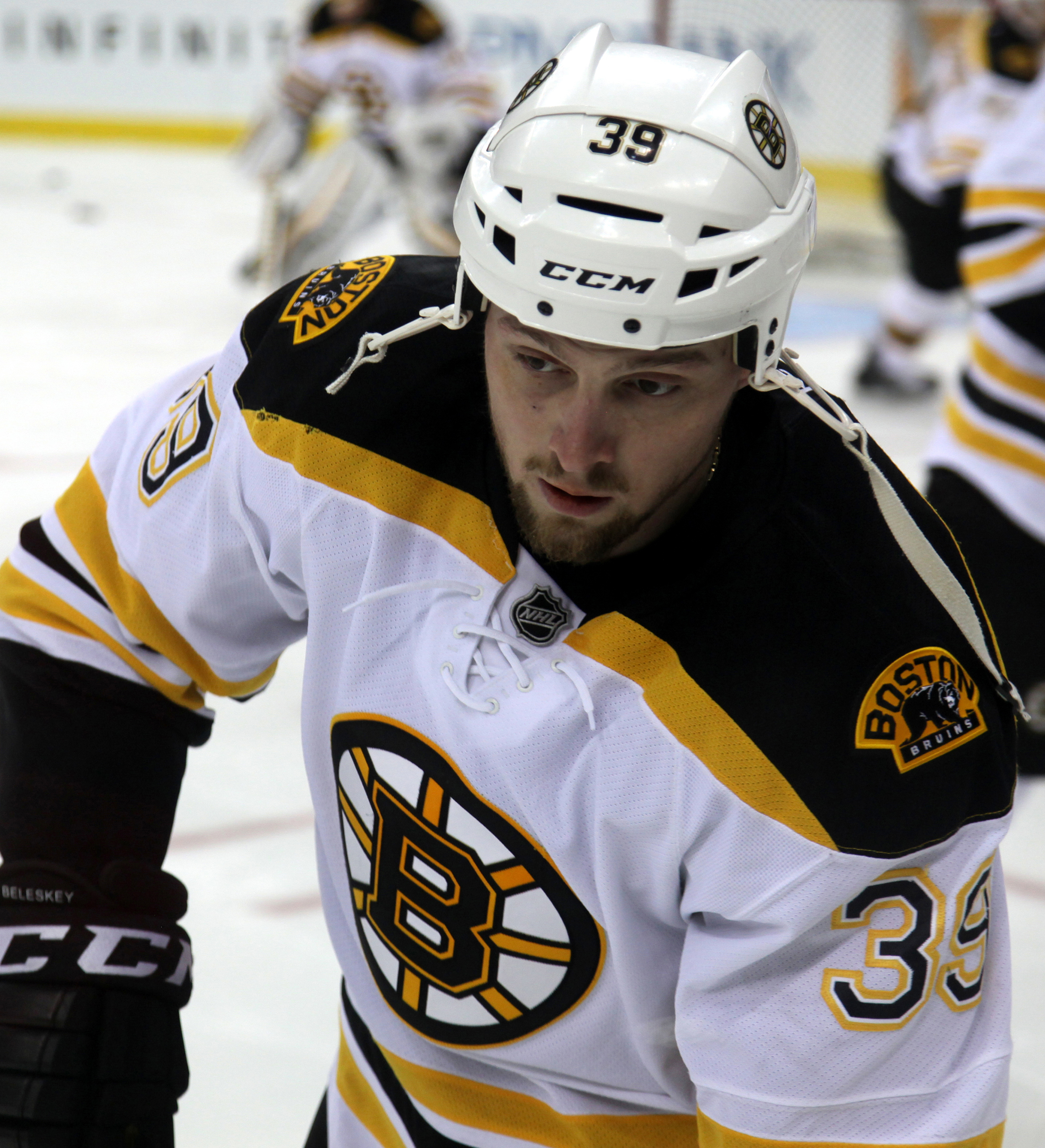
- Beleskey with the Boston Bruins in 2016
- Born: June 7, 1988 (age 38) Windsor, Ontario, Canada
- Height: 6 ft 0 in (183 cm)
- Weight: 207 lb (94 kg; 14 st 11 lb)
- Position: Left wing
- Shot: Left
- Played for: Anaheim Ducks; Coventry Blaze; Boston Bruins; New York Rangers
- NHL draft: 112th overall, 2006; Anaheim Ducks
- Playing career: 2008–2020

Matthew Beleskey (born June 7, 1988) is a Canadian former professional ice hockey left winger. He played in the National Hockey League (NHL) for the Anaheim Ducks, Boston Bruins and New York Rangers.

== Playing career ==
Beleskey grew up in the small town of Midhurst, Ontario in Springwater Township, Ontario. He played his minor hockey for the Barrie Icemen AAA program of the OMHA's Eastern AAA League. After his Bantam season with the Icemen, Beleskey played one season with the nearby Collingwood Blues Jr.A. club of the OHA.

He was drafted in the 2nd round (21st overall) in the 2004 OHL Priority Selection by the Belleville Bulls. In the 2008 OHL Finals versus the Kitchener Rangers, Belleville was down 3–0 in the series and 4–1 in the game, but on the back of captain Beleskey's four-point night, including the game winner in overtime, Belleville won the game and pushed the series to seven games, before ultimately losing the series.

He was selected by the Ducks 112th overall in the 2006 NHL entry draft and turned professional in 2008 after a four-year junior career with the Belleville Bulls of the Ontario Hockey League. He made his NHL debut in the 2008–09 season, appearing in two games with the Ducks but spent most of the season in the American Hockey League (AHL) with the Iowa Chops. Beleskey played in the UK for Coventry Blaze ice hockey team in the Elite Ice Hockey League during the NHL lock-out.

Playing in 65 games during the 2014–15 season, Beleskey scored 22 goals to go with 10 assists. He recorded eight goals and an assist during the 2015 playoffs as the Ducks lost to the Chicago Blackhawks during the Western Conference Finals.

On July 1, 2015, Beleskey signed as a free agent to a five-year $19.8 million contract with the Boston Bruins.

In the 2017–18 season, his third season with the Bruins and continuing to underperform relative to expectations, Beleskey was sent to the Bruins' AHL affiliate, the Providence Bruins on December 14, 2017.

On February 25, 2018, Beleskey, Ryan Spooner, Ryan Lindgren, a 2018 first-round pick and a 2019 seventh-round pick were traded to the New York Rangers in exchange for Rick Nash.

== Career statistics ==
=== Regular season and playoffs ===
| | | | Regular season | | | | | Playoffs |
| Season | Team | League | GP | G | A | Pts | PIM | GP | G | A | Pts | PIM |
|---|---|---|---|---|---|---|---|---|---|---|---|---|
| 2002–03 | Barrie Colts AAA | Bantam | 33 | 18 | 14 | 32 | 93 | — | — | — | — | — |
| 2003–04 | Collingwood Blues | OPJHL | 46 | 8 | 13 | 21 | 110 | 8 | 1 | 1 | 2 | 22 |
| 2004–05 | Belleville Bulls | OHL | 68 | 10 | 13 | 23 | 118 | 5 | 0 | 0 | 0 | 18 |
| 2005–06 | Belleville Bulls | OHL | 61 | 20 | 20 | 40 | 119 | 6 | 1 | 2 | 3 | 10 |
| 2006–07 | Belleville Bulls | OHL | 66 | 27 | 41 | 68 | 124 | 15 | 4 | 10 | 14 | 18 |
| 2007–08 | Belleville Bulls | OHL | 62 | 41 | 49 | 90 | 106 | 21 | 12 | 21 | 33 | 23 |
| 2008–09 | Iowa Chops | AHL | 58 | 11 | 24 | 35 | 58 | — | — | — | — | — |
| 2008–09 | Anaheim Ducks | NHL | 2 | 0 | 0 | 0 | 0 | — | — | — | — | — |
| 2009–10 | San Antonio Rampage | AHL | 12 | 1 | 4 | 5 | 19 | — | — | — | — | — |
| 2009–10 | Toronto Marlies | AHL | 3 | 1 | 1 | 2 | 2 | — | — | — | — | — |
| 2009–10 | Anaheim Ducks | NHL | 60 | 11 | 7 | 18 | 35 | — | — | — | — | — |
| 2010–11 | Anaheim Ducks | NHL | 35 | 3 | 7 | 10 | 36 | 6 | 1 | 0 | 1 | 4 |
| 2010–11 | Syracuse Crunch | AHL | 27 | 11 | 13 | 24 | 39 | — | — | — | — | — |
| 2011–12 | Anaheim Ducks | NHL | 70 | 4 | 11 | 15 | 72 | — | — | — | — | — |
| 2012–13 | Coventry Blaze | EIHL | 26 | 12 | 21 | 33 | 39 | — | — | — | — | — |
| 2012–13 | Anaheim Ducks | NHL | 42 | 8 | 5 | 13 | 56 | 7 | 2 | 1 | 3 | 2 |
| 2013–14 | Anaheim Ducks | NHL | 55 | 9 | 15 | 24 | 64 | 5 | 2 | 2 | 4 | 8 |
| 2013–14 | Norfolk Admirals | AHL | 3 | 1 | 0 | 1 | 0 | — | — | — | — | — |
| 2014–15 | Anaheim Ducks | NHL | 65 | 22 | 10 | 32 | 39 | 16 | 8 | 1 | 9 | 2 |
| 2015–16 | Boston Bruins | NHL | 80 | 15 | 22 | 37 | 65 | — | — | — | — | — |
| 2016–17 | Boston Bruins | NHL | 49 | 3 | 5 | 8 | 47 | 3 | 0 | 0 | 0 | 4 |
| 2017–18 | Boston Bruins | NHL | 14 | 0 | 0 | 0 | 17 | — | — | — | — | — |
| 2017–18 | Providence Bruins | AHL | 21 | 4 | 2 | 6 | 15 | — | — | — | — | — |
| 2017–18 | Hartford Wolf Pack | AHL | 14 | 1 | 5 | 6 | 11 | — | — | — | — | — |
| 2017–18 | New York Rangers | NHL | 1 | 0 | 0 | 0 | 4 | — | — | — | — | — |
| 2018–19 | Hartford Wolf Pack | AHL | 53 | 5 | 17 | 22 | 55 | — | — | — | — | — |
| 2018–19 | New York Rangers | NHL | 4 | 1 | 0 | 1 | 5 | — | — | — | — | — |
| 2019–20 | Hartford Wolf Pack | AHL | 56 | 16 | 10 | 26 | 55 | — | — | — | — | — |
| AHL totals | | | 247 | 51 | 76 | 127 | 254 | — | — | — | — | — |
| NHL totals | | | 477 | 76 | 82 | 158 | 440 | 37 | 13 | 4 | 17 | 20 |

=== International ===
| Year | Team | Event | Result | GP | G | A | Pts | PIM |
|---|---|---|---|---|---|---|---|---|
| 2006 | Canada | WJC18 | 4th | 7 | 0 | 1 | 1 | 37 |
| Junior totals | | | | 7 | 0 | 1 | 1 | 37 |
