= 2015 Stanley Cup playoffs =

Playoff tournament of the NHL

Tournament details
- Dates: April 15–June 15, 2015
- Teams: 16
- Defending champions: Los Angeles Kings (did not qualify)

Final positions
- Champions: Chicago Blackhawks
- Runners-up: Tampa Bay Lightning

Tournament statistics
- Scoring leader(s): Tyler Johnson (Lightning) and Patrick Kane (Blackhawks) (23 points)

Awards
- MVP: Duncan Keith (Blackhawks)

The 2015 Stanley Cup playoffs was the playoff tournament of the National Hockey League (NHL) for the 2014–15 season. They began on April 15, 2015, and ended on June 15, 2015, with the Chicago Blackhawks defeating the Tampa Bay Lightning four games to two in the Stanley Cup Finals.

The New York Rangers made the playoffs as the Presidents' Trophy winners with the most points (i.e. best record) during the regular season. They also came back from a 3–1 series deficit for the second consecutive year. The Detroit Red Wings increased their consecutive post-season appearance streak to 24 seasons, the longest current streak at the time and tied for the fourth-longest streak in NHL history. The Winnipeg Jets qualified for the playoffs for the first time since the former Atlanta Thrashers franchise relocated to Winnipeg in 2011; the only time that the Thrashers franchise made the post-season was in 2007, and the last time that the Winnipeg Jets hosted a playoff game was in 1996, the season before it was deactivated and the assets of the original Jets relocated to Phoenix, Arizona, to become the Coyotes. (Note: As of 2026, the Winnipeg Jets' franchise records from 1972 to 1996 were consolidated with the modern Jets/Thrashers franchise while the Arizona Coyotes were retconned as a 1996 expansion team.) The Ottawa Senators became the first team in the NHL's modern era (since 1942–43) to overcome a 14-point deficit in the standings to clinch a playoff spot. The Calgary Flames returned to the playoffs after a six-year absence. In total, five Canadian NHL teams qualified for the post-season, the most since 2004.

The Los Angeles Kings became the first defending Stanley Cup champions since the Carolina Hurricanes in 2007 to fail to make the playoffs. The Boston Bruins failed to make the playoffs for the first time since 2007 and became the first reigning Presidents' Trophy winners to miss the post-season since the Buffalo Sabres in 2008 (and the third overall). It was the first time in NHL history where both the defending Stanley Cup champions and the defending Presidents' Trophy winners missed the playoffs in the same post-season. In addition, the San Jose Sharks failed to make the post-season for the first time since 2003, ending the NHL's second-longest active playoff streak.

For the first time since 2000, both the Eastern and Western Conference finals went the full seven games. For the sixth consecutive season and tenth out of twelve seasons, a team from California was in the Western Conference final.

The Tampa Bay Lightning became the first team in league history to face an Original Six team in all four rounds of the playoffs in the same year, as they played against the Detroit Red Wings, Montreal Canadiens, New York Rangers and Chicago Blackhawks, respectively. They also became the fourth team to defeat three consecutive Original Six teams.

The Lightning also tied the 1987 Philadelphia Flyers, 2004 Calgary Flames and 2014 Los Angeles Kings for playing the most playoff games (26) in a postseason (later matched by the 2019 St. Louis Blues), all four currently hold the record under a four-round playoff format. The record was subsequently broken by the Dallas Stars during the expanded 2020 Stanley Cup playoffs.

== Playoff seeds ==
This was the second year in which the top three teams in each division made the playoffs, along with two wild cards in each conference (for a total of eight playoff teams from each conference).

The following teams qualified for the playoffs:

=== Eastern Conference ===
==== Atlantic Division ====
1. Montreal Canadiens, Atlantic Division champions – 110 points
2. Tampa Bay Lightning – 108 points
3. Detroit Red Wings – 100 points

==== Metropolitan Division ====
1. New York Rangers, Metropolitan Division champions, Eastern Conference regular season champions, Presidents' Trophy winners – 113 points
2. Washington Capitals – 101 points (40 ROWs, 6 points head-to-head vs. New York Islanders)
3. New York Islanders – 101 points (40 ROWs, 5 points head-to-head vs. Washington)

==== Wild cards ====
1. Ottawa Senators – 99 points
2. Pittsburgh Penguins – 98 points

=== Western Conference ===
==== Central Division ====
1. St. Louis Blues, Central Division champions – 109 points (42 ROWs)
2. Nashville Predators – 104 points
3. Chicago Blackhawks – 102 points

==== Pacific Division ====
1. Anaheim Ducks, Pacific Division champions, Western Conference regular season champions – 109 points (43 ROWs)
2. Vancouver Canucks – 101 points
3. Calgary Flames – 97 points

==== Wild cards ====
1. Minnesota Wild – 100 points
2. Winnipeg Jets – 99 points

== Playoff bracket ==
In each round, teams competed in a best-of-seven series following a 2–2–1–1–1 format (scores in the bracket indicate the number of games won in each best-of-seven series). The team with home ice advantage played at home for games one and two (and games five and seven, if necessary), and the other team was at home for games three and four (and game six, if necessary). The top three teams in each division made the playoffs, along with two wild cards in each conference, for a total of eight teams from each conference.

In the First Round, the lower seeded wild card in the conference played against the division winner with the best record while the other wild card played against the other division winner, and both wild cards were de facto #4 seeds. The other two teams from the divisions played against each other, with the second-placed team having home-ice advantage. In the first two rounds, home-ice advantage was awarded to the team with the better seed; in the last two rounds, it was awarded to the team that had the better regular season record.

First round	Second round
A1	Montreal	4
WC1	Ottawa	2
A1	Montreal	2
A2	Tampa Bay	4
A2	Tampa Bay	4
A3	Detroit	3
Eastern Conference
M1	NY Rangers	4
WC2	Pittsburgh	1
M1	NY Rangers	4
M2	Washington	3
M2	Washington	4
M3	NY Islanders	3
C1	St. Louis	2
WC1	Minnesota	4
WC1	Minnesota	0
C3	Chicago	4
C2	Nashville	2
C3	Chicago	4
Western Conference
P1	Anaheim	4
WC2	Winnipeg	0
P1	Anaheim	4
P3	Calgary	1
P2	Vancouver	2
P3	Calgary	4

Conference finals
A2	Tampa Bay	4
M1	NY Rangers	3
C3	Chicago	4
P1	Anaheim	3

Stanley Cup Finals
A2	Tampa Bay	2
C3	Chicago	4

Legend

- A1, A2, A3 – The first, second, and third place teams from the Atlantic Division, respectively
- M1, M2, M3 – The first, second, and third place teams from the Metropolitan Division, respectively
- C1, C2, C3 – The first, second, and third place teams from the Central Division, respectively
- P1, P2, P3 – The first, second, and third place teams from the Pacific Division, respectively
- WC1, WC2 – The first and second place teams in the Wild Card, respectively

== First round ==
=== Eastern Conference first round ===
==== (A1) Montreal Canadiens vs. (WC1) Ottawa Senators ====
The Montreal Canadiens finished first in the Atlantic division, earning 110 points. The Ottawa Senators finished as the Eastern Conference's first wild-card, earning 99 points. This was the second playoff meeting between these teams; their only previous meeting was in the 2013 Eastern Conference quarterfinals, which Ottawa won in five games. Ottawa won three of the four games in the regular season series.

The Canadiens won the first three games of the series en route to defeating the Senators in six games. In game one, Brian Flynn scored the game-winning goal at 17:17 of the second period, and recorded two assists as the Canadiens won 4–3. Montreal's P. K. Subban was given a five-minute major and a game misconduct for slashing Ottawa's Mark Stone during the second period, resulting in a microfracture of Stone's right wrist, but did not face any further League discipline. Alex Galchenyuk's goal at 3:40 into overtime gave the Canadiens a 3–2 win in game two. Cameron replaced Andrew Hammond with Craig Anderson as his starting goalie for game three, but Dale Weise tied the game with 5:47 left in the third period, then scored at 3:40 into overtime to give Montreal a 2–1 win. Anderson rebounded in game four, stopping all 28 Montreal shots while Mike Hoffman scored the Senators' only goal to win 1–0. Ottawa then took game five by a score of 5–1 as Anderson stopped 45 of 46 shots, and Bobby Ryan scored two goals. The Canadiens then eliminated the Senators in Game 6 2–0 as goaltender Carey Price stopped all 43 of Ottawa's shots.

April 15	Ottawa Senators	3–4	Montreal Canadiens	Bell Centre	Recap
Milan Michalek (1) – 12:25		First period	No scoring
Kyle Turris (1) – pp – 10:36; Mika Zibanejad (1) – pp – 12:36		Second period	07:53 – Torrey Mitchell (1); 08:08 – Tomas Plekanec (1); 11:42 – sh – Lars Eller (1); 17:17 – Brian Flynn (1)
No scoring		Third period	No scoring
Andrew Hammond 35 saves / 39 shots		Goalie stats	Carey Price 30 saves / 33 shots

April 17	Ottawa Senators	2–3	OT	Montreal Canadiens	Bell Centre	Recap
Clarke MacArthur (1) – 18:42		First period		No scoring
No scoring		Second period		07:18 – pp – Max Pacioretty (1); 16:30 – P.K. Subban (1)
Patrick Wiercioch (1) – pp – 13:25		Third period		No scoring
No scoring		First overtime period		03:40 – Alex Galchenyuk (1)
Andrew Hammond 39 saves / 42 shots		Goalie stats		Carey Price 29 saves / 31 shots

April 19	Montreal Canadiens	2–1	OT	Ottawa Senators	Canadian Tire Centre	Recap
No scoring		First period		11:28 – Clarke MacArthur (2)
No scoring		Second period		No scoring
Dale Weise (1) – 14:13		Third period		No scoring
Dale Weise (2) – 08:47		First overtime period		No scoring
Carey Price 33 saves / 34 shots		Goalie stats		Craig Anderson 47 saves / 49 shots

April 22	Montreal Canadiens	0–1	Ottawa Senators	Canadian Tire Centre	Recap
No scoring		First period	No scoring
No scoring		Second period	No scoring
No scoring		Third period	09:05 – Mike Hoffman (1)
Carey Price 31 saves / 32 shots		Goalie stats	Craig Anderson 28 saves / 28 shots

April 24	Ottawa Senators	5–1	Montreal Canadiens	Bell Centre	Recap
Bobby Ryan (1) – 09:29; Patrick Wiercioch (2) – 15:39		First period	No scoring
Erik Karlsson (1) – pp – 14:29		Second period	No scoring
Erik Condra (1) – 14:02; Bobby Ryan (2) – pp – 19:10		Third period	01:44 – Tom Gilbert (1)
Craig Anderson 45 saves / 46 shots		Goalie stats	Carey Price 20 saves / 25 shots

April 26	Montreal Canadiens	2–0	Ottawa Senators	Canadian Tire Centre	Recap
Brendan Gallagher (1) – 13:26		First period	No scoring
No scoring		Second period	No scoring
Max Pacioretty (2) – en – 19:59		Third period	No scoring
Carey Price 43 saves / 43 shots		Goalie stats	Craig Anderson 18 saves / 19 shots

Montreal won series 4–2

==== (A2) Tampa Bay Lightning vs. (A3) Detroit Red Wings ====
The Tampa Bay Lightning finished second in the Atlantic Division, earning 108 points. The Detroit Red Wings earned 100 points in the regular season to finish third in the Atlantic. This was the first playoff meeting between these two teams. Tampa Bay won three of the four games in the regular season series.

The Lightning defeated the Red Wings in seven games. Detroit goalie Petr Mrazek made 44 saves and Pavel Datsyuk recorded a goal and assist in a 3–2 win in game one. Tampa Bay took game two, 5–1, scoring four goals on 18 shots against Mrazek, including two from Tyler Johnson. Mrazek rebounded in game three, stopping all 22 shots in a 3–0 victory. In game four, the Lightning came back from a 2–0 third-period deficit to tie the game after Johnson and Ondrej Palat scored 1:17 apart. Johnson then scored at 2:25 of overtime for a 3–2 Tampa Bay win. Mrazek then recorded another shutout in game five, stopping 28 shots in a 4–0 win. In game six, Johnson scored two goals as the Lightning built a 3–0 second-period lead en route to a 5–2 victory. Although he was not penalized during game six, Detroit's Niklas Kronwall was later suspended one game by the NHL for charging Tampa Bay's Nikita Kucherov late in the second period. In game seven, Lightning goaltender Ben Bishop stopped all of Detroit's 31 shots, Braydon Coburn scored what proved to be the game-winning goal 3:58 into the third period and Anton Stralman scored the empty netter with 1:18 remaining in the game to give Tampa Bay a 2–0 victory.

April 16	Detroit Red Wings	3–2	Tampa Bay Lightning	Amalie Arena	Recap
Pavel Datsyuk (1) – 09:03		First period	14:31 – sh – Brian Boyle (1)
Tomas Jurco (1) – pp – 00:08		Second period	No scoring
Luke Glendening (1) – sh – 05:50		Third period	08:26 – Nikita Nesterov (1)
Petr Mrazek 44 saves / 46 shots		Goalie stats	Ben Bishop 11 saves / 14 shots

April 18	Detroit Red Wings	1–5	Tampa Bay Lightning	Amalie Arena	Recap
No scoring		First period	03:05 – pp – Tyler Johnson (1)
No scoring		Second period	07:56 – Alexander Killorn (1); 14:48 – Andrej Sustr (1); 19:22 – Tyler Johnson (2)
Tomas Tatar (1) – 05:49		Third period	15:26 – pp – Valtteri Filppula (1)
Petr Mrazek 14 saves / 18 shots Jimmy Howard 11 saves / 12 shots		Goalie stats	Ben Bishop 23 saves / 24 shots

April 21	Tampa Bay Lightning	0–3	Detroit Red Wings	Joe Louis Arena	Recap
No scoring		First period	08:46 – Pavel Datsyuk (2)
No scoring		Second period	No scoring
No scoring		Third period	06:42 – pp – Riley Sheahan (1); 19:11 – en – Luke Glendening (2)
Ben Bishop 18 saves / 20 shots		Goalie stats	Petr Mrazek 22 saves / 22 shots

April 23	Tampa Bay Lightning	3–2	OT	Detroit Red Wings	Joe Louis Arena	Recap
No scoring		First period		No scoring
No scoring		Second period		05:42 – Gustav Nyquist (1); 14:24 – Joakim Andersson (1)
Tyler Johnson (3) – 14:34; Ondrej Palat (1) – 15:51		Third period		No scoring
Tyler Johnson (4) – 02:25		First overtime period		No scoring
Ben Bishop 22 saves / 24 shots		Goalie stats		Petr Mrazek 26 saves / 29 shots

April 25	Detroit Red Wings	4–0	Tampa Bay Lightning	Amalie Arena	Recap
Riley Sheahan (2) – pp – 19:37		First period	No scoring
Drew Miller (1) – 15:46		Second period	No scoring
Pavel Datsyuk (3) – pp – 15:47; Danny DeKeyser (1) – en – 18:22		Third period	No scoring
Petr Mrazek 28 saves / 28 shots		Goalie stats	Ben Bishop 26 saves / 29 shots

April 27	Tampa Bay Lightning	5–2	Detroit Red Wings	Joe Louis Arena	Recap
Tyler Johnson (5) – 03:47; Jason Garrison (1) – 11:10		First period	No scoring
Tyler Johnson (6) – 09:09		Second period	12:26 – pp – Tomas Tatar (2)
Alexander Killorn (2) – 14:51; Cedric Paquette (1) – en – 19:03		Third period	01:39 – Tomas Tatar (3)
Ben Bishop 22 saves / 24 shots		Goalie stats	Petr Mrazek 23 saves / 27 shots

April 29	Detroit Red Wings	0–2	Tampa Bay Lightning	Amalie Arena	Recap
No scoring		First period	No scoring
No scoring		Second period	No scoring
No scoring		Third period	03:58 – Braydon Coburn (1); 18:42 – en – Anton Stralman (1)
Petr Mrazek 15 saves / 16 shots		Goalie stats	Ben Bishop 31 saves / 31 shots

Tampa Bay won series 4–3

==== (M1) New York Rangers vs. (WC2) Pittsburgh Penguins ====
The New York Rangers earned the Presidents' Trophy as the NHL's best regular season team, earning 113 points. The Pittsburgh Penguins finished as the Eastern Conference's second wild-card, earning 98 points. This was the sixth playoff meeting between these teams, with Pittsburgh having won four of the five previous series. Their most recent meeting was in the previous year's Eastern Conference Second Round, which New York won in seven games. New York won three of the four games in the regular season series.

The Rangers defeated the Penguins in five games. In game one, Derick Brassard and Ryan McDonagh each had goals, while goaltender Henrik Lundqvist stopped 24 out of 25 shots, to help give the Rangers a 2–1 victory. In game two, Sidney Crosby scored two goals in a span of 4:39 to help give Pittsburgh a 3–1 second-period lead, en route to a 4–3 win. The Rangers took game three, 2–1, as they held the Penguins to just 11 shots on goal through the first and second periods, and Lundqvist made 12 out of 13 saves in the third. Rookie centre Kevin Hayes then scored the game-winning goal 3:14 into overtime of game four to give the Rangers another 2–1 victory. The Rangers then recorded a third consecutive 2–1 victory in game five, with Carl Hagelin scoring 10:52 into overtime, to take the series. Hagelin became the first Ranger to accomplish this feat since Stephane Matteau scored a goal in game seven against the New Jersey Devils in 1994. The Penguins were eliminated in the first round for the first time since 2012.

April 16	Pittsburgh Penguins	1–2	New York Rangers	Madison Square Garden	Recap
No scoring		First period	00:28 – Derick Brassard (1); 15:16 – pp – Ryan McDonagh (1)
Blake Comeau (1) – 06:15		Second period	No scoring
No scoring		Third period	No scoring
Marc-Andre Fleury 36 saves / 38 shots		Goalie stats	Henrik Lundqvist 24 saves / 25 shots

April 18	Pittsburgh Penguins	4–3	New York Rangers	Madison Square Garden	Recap
No scoring		First period	17:05 – Derek Stepan (1)
Brandon Sutter (1) – pp – 10:01; Sidney Crosby (1) – 14:07; Sidney Crosby (2) – 18:46		Second period	No scoring
Chris Kunitz (1) – pp – 09:41		Third period	03:16 – pp – Derick Brassard (2); 19:54 – Rick Nash (1)
Marc-Andre Fleury 23 saves / 26 shots		Goalie stats	Henrik Lundqvist 18 saves / 22 shots

April 20	New York Rangers	2–1	Pittsburgh Penguins	Consol Energy Center	Recap
Carl Hagelin (1) – 08:43		First period	No scoring
Chris Kreider (1) – 11:07		Second period	No scoring
No scoring		Third period	13:12 – Patric Hornqvist (1)
Henrik Lundqvist 23 saves / 24 shots		Goalie stats	Marc-Andre Fleury 24 saves / 26 shots

April 22	New York Rangers	2–1	OT	Pittsburgh Penguins	Consol Energy Center	Recap
No scoring		First period		02:22 – Patric Hornqvist (2)
Derick Brassard (3) – 17:15		Second period		No scoring
No scoring		Third period		No scoring
Kevin Hayes (1) – 03:14		First overtime period		No scoring
Henrik Lundqvist 22 saves / 23 shots		Goalie stats		Marc-Andre Fleury 22 saves / 24 shots

April 24	Pittsburgh Penguins	1–2	OT	New York Rangers	Madison Square Garden	Recap
No scoring		First period		04:23 – pp – Derek Stepan (2)
Nick Spaling (1) – 17:23		Second period		No scoring
No scoring		Third period		No scoring
No scoring		First overtime period		10:52 – Carl Hagelin (2)
Marc-Andre Fleury 34 saves / 36 shots		Goalie stats		Henrik Lundqvist 37 saves / 38 shots

New York won series 4–1

==== (M2) Washington Capitals vs. (M3) New York Islanders ====
Both the Washington Capitals and the New York Islanders finished tied for second in the Metropolitan Division with 101 points, but Washington was awarded home-ice advantage by winning the head-to-head points tie-breaker (6–5). This was the seventh playoff meeting between these teams, with New York having won five of the six previous series. Their most recent meeting was in the 1993 Patrick Division semifinals, which New York won in six games. The teams split the four-game regular season series, with each team winning twice at home.

The Capitals defeated the Islanders in seven games. The Islanders took game one, 4–1, led by Brock Nelson's two goals, and Josh Bailey's goal and an assist. In game two, Washington came back from a 3–1 second-period deficit to score three unanswered goals to win, 4–3, despite being forced to start rookie goalie Philipp Grubauer in this match in place of an ill Braden Holtby. Games three and four ended in overtime: John Tavares scored 15 seconds into the extra period to give the Islanders a 2–1 victory in Game 3, and Nicklas Backstrom's goal 11:09 into overtime gave the Capitals a 2–1 victory in game four. Washington then controlled game five with a 5–1 victory, led by Evgeny Kuznetsov's two goals and an assist. The Islanders then took Game 6, 3–1, as Nikolay Kulemin scored at 10:33 of the third period to break a 1–1 tie, and Cal Clutterbuck added an empty netter. Game six proved to be the last playoff game that the Islanders played at Nassau Coliseum (until 2019) before moving full-time to the Barclays Center for three seasons, as Washington's Evgeny Kuznetsov scored the game-winning goal 12:42 into the third period of game seven to help give the Capitals the victory, 2–1.

April 15	New York Islanders	4–1	Washington Capitals	Verizon Center	Recap
Brock Nelson (1) – 06:06		First period	19:03 – Marcus Johansson (1)
Ryan Strome (1) – 03:50; Josh Bailey (1) – 10:36		Second period	No scoring
Brock Nelson (2) – en – 18:41		Third period	No scoring
Jaroslav Halak 24 saves / 25 shots		Goalie stats	Braden Holtby 23 saves / 26 shots

April 17	New York Islanders	3–4	Washington Capitals	Verizon Center	Recap
Cal Clutterbuck (1) – 05:14		First period	No scoring
Ryan Strome (2) – 03:24; Kyle Okposo (1) – 14:09		Second period	11:26 – Karl Alzner (1); 16:09 – Alexander Ovechkin (1)
No scoring		Third period	03:44 – pp – Nicklas Backstrom (1); 07:37 – Jason Chimera (1)
Jaroslav Halak 31 saves / 35 shots		Goalie stats	Philipp Grubauer 18 saves / 21 shots

April 19	Washington Capitals	1–2	OT	New York Islanders	Nassau Coliseum	Recap
No scoring		First period		No scoring
No scoring		Second period		12:37 – Kyle Okposo (2)
Nicklas Backstrom (2) – 13:54		Third period		No scoring
No scoring		First overtime period		00:15 – John Tavares (1)
Braden Holtby 40 saves / 42 shots		Goalie stats		Jaroslav Halak 24 saves / 25 shots

April 21	Washington Capitals	2–1	OT	New York Islanders	Nassau Coliseum	Recap
Alexander Ovechkin (2) – 13:06		First period		19:47 – Casey Cizikas (1)
No scoring		Second period		No scoring
No scoring		Third period		No scoring
Nicklas Backstrom (3) – 11:09		First overtime period		No scoring
Braden Holtby 36 saves / 37 shots		Goalie stats		Jaroslav Halak 28 saves / 30 shots

April 23	New York Islanders	1–5	Washington Capitals	Verizon Center	Recap
Josh Bailey (2) – 05:48		First period	09:05 – Evgeny Kuznetsov (1)
No scoring		Second period	10:31 – Karl Alzner (2)
No scoring		Third period	02:42 – Brooks Laich (1); 06:19 – Evgeny Kuznetsov (2); 09:00 – Jason Chimera (2)
Jaroslav Halak 30 saves / 35 shots Michal Neuvirth 6 saves / 6 shots		Goalie stats	Braden Holtby 22 saves / 23 shots

April 25	Washington Capitals	1–3	New York Islanders	Nassau Coliseum	Recap
John Carlson (1) – pp – 19:55		First period	06:56 – John Tavares (2)
No scoring		Second period	No scoring
No scoring		Third period	10:33 – Nikolay Kulemin (1); 19:07 – en – Cal Clutterbuck (2)
Braden Holtby 35 saves / 37 shots		Goalie stats	Jaroslav Halak 38 saves / 39 shots

April 27	New York Islanders	1–2	Washington Capitals	Verizon Center	Recap
No scoring		First period	No scoring
No scoring		Second period	18:35 – Joel Ward (1)
Frans Nielsen (1) – 03:13		Third period	12:42 – Evgeny Kuznetsov (3)
Jaroslav Halak 24 saves / 26 shots		Goalie stats	Braden Holtby 10 saves / 11 shots

Washington won series 4–3

=== Western Conference first round ===
==== (C1) St. Louis Blues vs. (WC1) Minnesota Wild ====
The St. Louis Blues finished first in the Central Division, earning 109 points. The Minnesota Wild finished as the Western Conference's first wild-card, earning 100 points. This was the first playoff meeting between these two teams. The teams split the four-game regular season series, with each team winning once at home and once on the road.

The Wild defeated the Blues in six games. Minnesota took game one, 4–2, as goaltender Devan Dubnyk recorded 19 saves. Vladimir Tarasenko then recorded a hat trick to help lead the Blues to a 4–1 victory in game two. In game three, Dubnyk stopped all 17 St. Louis shots to lead the Wild to a 3–0 win. The Blues then rebounded in game four, as five different players scored off of Dubnyk in a 6–1 win. The Wild goalie responded in game five by making 37 saves while Nino Niederreiter and Mikko Koivu scored in a span of 1:26 in the second period to win 4–1. Minnesota then eliminated St. Louis in game six with another 4–1 victory, as Dubnyk made 30 saves and Zach Parise scored two goals. Up until 2026, this would be the last time the Wild would win a playoff series.

April 16	Minnesota Wild	4–2	St. Louis Blues	Scottrade Center	Recap
Jason Zucker (1) – 02:47		First period	No scoring
Matt Dumba (1) – pp – 04:10		Second period	No scoring
Mikael Granlund (1) – en – 18:47; Jason Pominville (1) – en – 19:40		Third period	07:12 – Jaden Schwartz (1); 19:01 – sh – Alexander Steen (1)
Devan Dubnyk 19 saves / 21 shots		Goalie stats	Jake Allen 25 saves / 27 shots

April 18	Minnesota Wild	1–4	St. Louis Blues	Scottrade Center	Recap
No scoring		First period	13:18 – Vladimir Tarasenko (1); 18:01 – pp – Vladimir Tarasenko (2)
No scoring		Second period	No scoring
Marco Scandella (1) – 01:46		Third period	18:02 – Patrik Berglund (1); 19:43 – en – Vladimir Tarasenko (3)
Devan Dubnyk 23 saves / 26 shots		Goalie stats	Jake Allen 24 saves / 25 shots

April 20	St. Louis Blues	0–3	Minnesota Wild	Xcel Energy Center	Recap
No scoring		First period	No scoring
No scoring		Second period	14:08 – Jason Pominville (2); 16:13 – Zach Parise (1)
No scoring		Third period	17:58 – en – Nino Niederreiter (1)
Jake Allen 21 saves / 23 shots		Goalie stats	Devan Dubnyk 17 saves / 17 shots

April 22	St. Louis Blues	6–1	Minnesota Wild	Xcel Energy Center	Recap
Ryan Reaves (1) – 05:34; Vladimir Tarasenko (4) – 06:59; David Backes (1) – 10:06		First period	No scoring
Paul Stastny (1) – 03:39; Vladimir Tarasenko (5) – 15:47; Patrik Berglund (2) – 16:50		Second period	01:41 – pp – Jared Spurgeon (1)
No scoring		Third period	No scoring
Jake Allen 17 saves / 18 shots		Goalie stats	Devan Dubnyk 11 saves / 17 shots Darcy Kuemper 9 saves / 9 shots

April 24	Minnesota Wild	4–1	St. Louis Blues	Scottrade Center	Recap
Marco Scandella (2) – 11:06		First period	08:04 – pp – Vladimir Tarasenko (6)
Nino Niederreiter (2) – 14:56; Mikko Koivu (1) – pp – 16:22		Second period	No scoring
Charlie Coyle (1) – 14:50		Third period	No scoring
Devan Dubnyk 36 saves / 37 shots		Goalie stats	Jake Allen 15 saves / 19 shots

April 26	St. Louis Blues	1–4	Minnesota Wild	Xcel Energy Center	Recap
No scoring		First period	07:14 – sh – Zach Parise (2)
T.J. Oshie (1) – 19:56		Second period	11:19 – Justin Fontaine (1)
No scoring		Third period	01:01 – Zach Parise (3); 18:08 – en – Nino Niederreiter (3)
Jake Allen 11 saves / 13 shots Brian Elliott 6 saves / 7 shots		Goalie stats	Devan Dubnyk 30 saves / 31 shots

Minnesota won series 4–2

==== (C2) Nashville Predators vs. (C3) Chicago Blackhawks ====
The Nashville Predators finished second in the Central Division, earning 104 points. The Chicago Blackhawks earned 102 points during the regular season to finish third in the Central Division. This was the second playoff meeting between these teams; their only previous meeting was in the 2010 Western Conference quarterfinals, which Chicago won in six games. Chicago won three of the four games in the regular season series.

The Blackhawks defeated the Predators in six games. In game one, Nashville scored three-straight first period goals on Chicago goaltender Corey Crawford, prompting Blackhawks head coach Joel Quenneville to put backup Scott Darling in net. Chicago then rallied, scoring three-straight second period goals to tie the game before Duncan Keith scored 7:49 into double overtime to give the Blackhawks a 4–3 victory. Crawford again started in game two, but the Predators scored four unanswered goals on him, including two goals from Craig Smith, to tie the series with a 6–2 win. Darling was named the starter for game three and then stopped 35 Nashville shots, while Chicago scored three second-period goals to grab a 4–2 win. Game four ended exactly a minute into triple overtime when Brent Seabrook's one-timer from the blue line went past Nashville goalie Pekka Rinne into the net, giving the Blackhawks a 3–2 victory. Filip Forsberg recorded his first NHL hat-trick, and Nashville scored three goals in a 2:27 span in the third period in game five to win, 5–2. In game six, Quenneville pulled Darling after giving up three first period goals on 12 Nashville shots. Chicago then rallied behind Crawford, with Keith scoring the game-winning goal 16:12 into the third period to give the Blackhawks a 4–3 win and the series.

April 15	Chicago Blackhawks	4–3	2OT	Nashville Predators	Bridgestone Arena	Recap
No scoring		First period		06:07 – Colin Wilson (1); 17:20 – Viktor Stalberg (1); 19:33 – pp – Colin Wilson (2)
Niklas Hjalmarsson (1) – 01:43; Patrick Sharp (1) – pp – 08:32; Jonathan Toews (1) – pp – 13:50		Second period		No scoring
No scoring		Third period		No scoring
Duncan Keith (1) – 07:49		Second overtime period		No scoring
Corey Crawford 9 saves / 12 shots Scott Darling 42 saves / 42 shots		Goalie stats		Pekka Rinne 38 saves / 42 shots

April 17	Chicago Blackhawks	2–6	Nashville Predators	Bridgestone Arena	Recap
Patrick Sharp (2) – 16:13		First period	02:47 – pp – Colin Wilson (3); 19:56 – Roman Josi (1)
Patrick Kane (1) – 10:32		Second period	14:54 – Craig Smith (1)
No scoring		Third period	12:41 – Filip Forsberg (1); 14:28 – Craig Smith (2); 15:00 – Mike Santorelli (1)
Corey Crawford 29 saves / 35 shots		Goalie stats	Pekka Rinne 24 saves / 26 shots

April 19	Nashville Predators	2–4	Chicago Blackhawks	United Center	Recap
Mike Ribeiro (1) – 15:19		First period	14:48 – Andrew Desjardins (1)
Mattias Ekholm (1) – 00:58		Second period	00:36 – Jonathan Toews (2); 03:38 – Brandon Saad (1); 12:41 – Brent Seabrook (1)
No scoring		Third period	No scoring
Pekka Rinne 26 saves / 30 shots		Goalie stats	Scott Darling 35 saves / 37 shots

April 21	Nashville Predators	2–3	3OT	Chicago Blackhawks	United Center	Recap
Colin Wilson (4) – pp – 11:38		First period		13:05 – Antoine Vermette (1)
James Neal (1) – 17:02		Second period		No scoring
No scoring		Third period		11:03 – Brandon Saad (2)
No scoring		Third overtime period		01:00 – Brent Seabrook (2)
Pekka Rinne 45 saves / 48 shots		Goalie stats		Scott Darling 50 saves / 52 shots

April 23	Chicago Blackhawks	2–5	Nashville Predators	Bridgestone Arena	Recap
Brad Richards (1) – 13:27		First period	14:42 – Filip Forsberg (2)
No scoring		Second period	No scoring
Kris Versteeg (1) – 14:52		Third period	00:47 – James Neal (2); 03:02 – pp – Colin Wilson (5); 03:14 – Filip Forsberg (3); 19:49 – en – Filip Forsberg (4)
Scott Darling 24 saves / 28 shots		Goalie stats	Pekka Rinne 28 saves / 30 shots

April 25	Nashville Predators	3–4	Chicago Blackhawks	United Center	Recap
James Neal (3) – 01:10; James Neal (4) – pp – 08:09; Matt Cullen (1) – 11:16		First period	10:37 – Patrick Sharp (3); 12:14 – pp – Jonathan Toews (3); 19:54 – Patrick Kane (2)
No scoring		Second period	No scoring
No scoring		Third period	16:12 – Duncan Keith (2)
Pekka Rinne 28 saves / 32 shots		Goalie stats	Scott Darling 9 saves / 12 shots Corey Crawford 13 saves / 13 shots

Chicago won series 4–2

==== (P1) Anaheim Ducks vs. (WC2) Winnipeg Jets ====
The Anaheim Ducks finished first in the Pacific Division, earning 109 points. The Winnipeg Jets finished as the Western Conference's second wild-card, earning 99 points. This was the first playoff meeting between these two teams. Anaheim won all three games in the regular season series. This series also marked the first appearance of a team representing Winnipeg in the Stanley Cup playoffs in 19 years, as the Jets made the playoffs for the first time since moving from Atlanta, and for the second time in franchise history since their only playoff appearance in 2007 when they were swept in the conference quarterfinals, leaving them entering the 2014–15 season as the only NHL franchise to never record a post-season win. The most recent team to represent Winnipeg prior to this was the original Winnipeg Jets, who lost in the Western Conference quarterfinals in 1996.

The Ducks won each of the first three games with third-period comebacks en route to sweeping the series against the Jets. Down 2–1 in the third period of game one, Corey Perry scored twice, Ryan Getzlaf scored once and Sami Vatanen scored once to help give Anaheim a 4–2 win. Winnipeg entered the third period of game two with a 1–0 lead, but Anaheim prevailed, 2–1, after Patrick Maroon tied the game midway through the period and then Jakob Silfverberg scored the game-winning goal with 21 seconds left. In game three, the Jets held a 4–3 lead late in the third period, but Ryan Kesler tied the game with 2:14 left in regulation and Rickard Rakell scored 5:12 into overtime to give the Ducks a 5–4 win. Anaheim only needed to come from behind from a one-goal deficit in the first period of game four, scoring three unanswered goals between the first and third periods. Kesler scored two third-period goals, and Perry recorded two assists, to close out the series for the Ducks with a 5–2 victory.

April 16	Winnipeg Jets	2–4	Anaheim Ducks	Honda Center	Recap
Adam Lowry (1) – 02:46		First period	01:57 – Sami Vatanen (1)
Drew Stafford (1) – 05:00		Second period	No scoring
No scoring		Third period	01:09 – pp – Corey Perry (1); 13:21 – Corey Perry (2); 16:55 – pp – Ryan Getzlaf (1)
Ondrej Pavelec 29 saves / 33 shots		Goalie stats	Frederik Andersen 25 saves / 27 shots

April 18	Winnipeg Jets	1–2	Anaheim Ducks	Honda Center	Recap
No scoring		First period	No scoring
Adam Pardy (1) – 15:43		Second period	No scoring
No scoring		Third period	10:43 – pp – Patrick Maroon (1); 19:39 – Jakob Silfverberg (1)
Ondrej Pavelec 37 saves / 39 shots		Goalie stats	Frederik Andersen 28 saves / 29 shots

April 20	Anaheim Ducks	5–4	OT	Winnipeg Jets	MTS Centre	Recap
Cam Fowler (1) – 19:53		First period		09:38 – Lee Stempniak (1)
Corey Perry (3) – 03:08; Jakob Silfverberg (2) – 16:04		Second period		06:40 – pp – Tyler Myers (1); 09:37 – Blake Wheeler (1); 18:18 – Bryan Little (1)
Ryan Kesler (1) – 17:46		Third period		No scoring
Rickard Rakell (1) – 05:12		First overtime period		No scoring
Frederik Andersen 31 saves / 35 shots		Goalie stats		Ondrej Pavelec 26 saves / 31 shots

April 22	Anaheim Ducks	5–2	Winnipeg Jets	MTS Centre	Recap
Emerson Etem (1) – 17:52		First period	16:26 – pp – Bryan Little (2)
Andrew Cogliano (1) – 12:55		Second period	No scoring
Ryan Kesler (2) – 06:41; Ryan Kesler (3) – 15:11; Sami Vatanen (2) – en – 19:33		Third period	10:27 – Mark Stuart (1)
Frederik Andersen 25 saves / 27 shots		Goalie stats	Ondrej Pavelec 30 saves / 34 shots

Anaheim won series 4–0

==== (P2) Vancouver Canucks vs. (P3) Calgary Flames ====
The Vancouver Canucks finished second in the Pacific Division, earning 101 points. The Calgary Flames earned 97 points during the regular season to finish third in the Pacific Division. This was the seventh playoff meeting between these teams with Calgary having won four of the six previous series. Their most recent meeting was in the 2004 Western Conference quarterfinals, which Calgary won in seven games. The Flames qualified for the playoffs for the first time since 2009. The teams split the four-game regular season series, with each team winning once at home and once on the road.

The Flames defeated the Canucks in six games. Calgary rallied from a one-goal deficit in game one, as David Jones tied the game 7:59 into the third and Kris Russell scored the winning goal with 29.6 seconds left to give the Flames a 2–1 win. The Canucks tied the series with a 4–1 win, as goalie Eddie Lack made 22 out of 23 saves and Alex Burrows recorded two assists. With 1:17 left to play, a fight broke out that resulted in 132 penalty minutes, with the Flames' Deryk Engelland given a game misconduct for instigating it, but eventually the league rescinded Engelland's penalty and instead fined Calgary head coach Bob Hartley $50,000 for his responsibility for the incident. Jonas Hiller made 23 saves to help give the Flames a 4–2 win in game three. In game four, Calgary scored three first-period goals out of seven shots off of Lack. Ryan Miller replaced Lack to start the second period, but Hiller made 28 total saves en route to a 3–1 win. Miller then made 20 saves and Daniel Sedin scored the winning goal 1:47 into the third period to help give the Canucks a 2–1 win in Game five. In game six, Hartley pulled Hiller after he allowed two goals on his first three shots, and put Karri Ramo in net. The Flames tied the game in the second period, and then Matt Stajan scored what proved to be the game-winning goal late in the third period. Two empty net goals in the final minute of the game sealed the series victory for the Flames.

April 15	Calgary Flames	2–1	Vancouver Canucks	Rogers Arena	Recap
No scoring		First period	No scoring
No scoring		Second period	12:08 – Bo Horvat (1)
David Jones (1) – 07:59; Kris Russell (1) – 19:30		Third period	No scoring
Jonas Hiller 29 saves / 30 shots		Goalie stats	Eddie Lack 28 saves / 30 shots

April 17	Calgary Flames	1–4	Vancouver Canucks	Rogers Arena	Recap
No scoring		First period	02:56 – Daniel Sedin (1); 07:06 – pp – Chris Higgins (1)
No scoring		Second period	No scoring
Kris Russell (2) – pp – 16:26		Third period	02:17 – Ronalds Kenins (1); 17:59 – en – Radim Vrbata (1)
Jonas Hiller 26 saves / 29 shots Karri Ramo 2 saves / 2 shots		Goalie stats	Eddie Lack 22 saves / 23 shots

April 19	Vancouver Canucks	2–4	Calgary Flames	Scotiabank Saddledome	Recap
Shawn Matthias (1) – 09:09		First period	06:35 – Brandon Bollig (1); 15:02 – T.J. Brodie (1)
No scoring		Second period	No scoring
Jannik Hansen (1) – 17:41		Third period	02:14 – Sam Bennett (1); 14:36 – pp – Sean Monahan (1)
Eddie Lack 24 saves / 28 shots		Goalie stats	Jonas Hiller 23 saves / 25 shots

April 21	Vancouver Canucks	1–3	Calgary Flames	Scotiabank Saddledome	Recap
Henrik Sedin (1) – pp – 08:12		First period	03:23 – pp – Johnny Gaudreau (1); 09:20 – pp – Jiri Hudler (1); 19:18 – Sam Bennett (2)
No scoring		Second period	No scoring
No scoring		Third period	No scoring
Eddie Lack 4 saves / 7 shots Ryan Miller 15 saves / 15 shots		Goalie stats	Jonas Hiller 28 saves / 29 shots

April 23	Calgary Flames	1–2	Vancouver Canucks	Rogers Arena	Recap
David Jones (2) – 02:40		First period	No scoring
No scoring		Second period	13:31 – Nick Bonino (1)
No scoring		Third period	01:47 – Daniel Sedin (2)
Jonas Hiller 41 saves / 43 shots		Goalie stats	Ryan Miller 20 saves / 21 shots

April 25	Vancouver Canucks	4–7	Calgary Flames	Scotiabank Saddledome	Recap
Brandon McMillan (1) – 02:36; Jannik Hansen (2) – 07:32; Radim Vrbata (2) – pp – 09:42		First period	17:02 – Micheal Ferland (1)
Luca Sbisa (1) – 10:36		Second period	01:02 – Sean Monahan (2); 05:35 – Johnny Gaudreau (2)
No scoring		Third period	06:14 – pp – Jiri Hudler (2); 15:43 – Matt Stajan (1); 19:31 – en – Jiri Hudler (3); 19:57 – en – Micheal Ferland (2)
Ryan Miller 26 saves / 31 shots		Goalie stats	Jonas Hiller 1 save / 3 shots Karri Ramo 17 saves / 19 shots

Calgary won series 4–2

== Second round ==
=== Eastern Conference second round ===
==== (A1) Montreal Canadiens vs. (A2) Tampa Bay Lightning ====
This was the third playoff meeting for these teams; the teams had split their two previous playoff series. Their most recent meeting was in the previous year's Eastern Conference First Round, in which Montreal swept Tampa Bay out of the playoffs. Tampa Bay won all five games in the regular season series.

The Lightning defeated the Canadiens in six games. In game one, Nikita Kucherov scored 2:06 into double overtime to give Tampa Bay a 2–1 win. This winning goal was controversial because the Lightning appeared to have been offside on the play, but nothing was called by the linesmen. Earlier at 2:56 of the first overtime period, Kucherov's apparent winning goal was waved off after officials ruled that he pushed Carey Price's pad into the net after the Montreal goalie made the initial save. The Lightning also won game two, 6–2, scoring four power play goals. Montreal's Brandon Prust was then fined $5,000 for his postgame derogatory public comments directed toward Referee Brad Watson, which he later apologized for the day afterward. In game three, Tyler Johnson scored with 1.1 seconds left to give Tampa Bay a 2–1 victory. The Canadiens stayed alive in game four, as Max Pacioretty recorded a shorthanded goal and two assists, as Montreal built a 5–0 second-period lead en route to a 6–2 win. Then in game five, P.A. Parenteau scored with 4:07 left in regulation to give the Canadiens a 2–1 victory. In game six, Ben Bishop stopped 18 of 19 Montreal shots, and Kucherov scored two goals, as Tampa Bay won 4–1 to take the series.

May 1	Tampa Bay Lightning	2–1	2OT	Montreal Canadiens	Bell Centre	Recap
No scoring		First period		No scoring
No scoring		Second period		No scoring
Tyler Johnson (7) – 02:34		Third period		14:47 – Max Pacioretty (3)
Nikita Kucherov (1) – 02:06		Second overtime period		No scoring
Ben Bishop 43 saves / 44 shots		Goalie stats		Carey Price 33 saves / 35 shots

May 3	Tampa Bay Lightning	6–2	Montreal Canadiens	Bell Centre	Recap
Valtteri Filppula (2) – pp – 19:36		First period	07:20 – Jeff Petry (1)
Steven Stamkos (1) – 08:06; Nikita Kucherov (2) – pp – 12:29; Victor Hedman (1) – pp – 19:46		Second period	No scoring
Nikita Kucherov (3) – pp – 06:37; J.T. Brown (1) – 16:05		Third period	11:06 – Tom Gilbert (2)
Ben Bishop 27 saves / 29 shots		Goalie stats	Carey Price 18 saves / 24 shots

May 6	Montreal Canadiens	1–2	Tampa Bay Lightning	Amalie Arena	Recap
No scoring		First period	12:00 – Alexander Killorn (3)
No scoring		Second period	No scoring
Brendan Gallagher (2) – 10:03		Third period	19:58 – Tyler Johnson (8)
Carey Price 17 saves / 19 shots		Goalie stats	Ben Bishop 30 saves / 31 shots

May 7	Montreal Canadiens	6–2	Tampa Bay Lightning	Amalie Arena	Recap
Andrei Markov (1) – 02:44; Max Pacioretty (4) – sh – 08:43		First period	No scoring
David Desharnais (1) – 05:08; Jeff Petry (2) – pp – 09:39; Brendan Gallagher (3) – 09:54		Second period	12:26 – pp – Nikita Kucherov (4)
Brandon Prust (1) – 04:52		Third period	00:17 – pp – Ondrej Palat (2)
Carey Price 22 saves / 24 shots		Goalie stats	Ben Bishop 11 saves / 14 shots Andrei Vasilevskiy 23 saves / 26 shots

May 9	Tampa Bay Lightning	1–2	Montreal Canadiens	Bell Centre	Recap
No scoring		First period	09:01 – Devante Smith-Pelly (1)
No scoring		Second period	No scoring
Steven Stamkos (2) – 09:27		Third period	15:53 – P.A. Parenteau (1)
Ben Bishop 27 saves / 29 shots		Goalie stats	Carey Price 24 saves / 25 shots

May 12	Montreal Canadiens	1–4	Tampa Bay Lightning	Amalie Arena	Recap
No scoring		First period	15:35 – Nikita Kucherov (5)
No scoring		Second period	05:12 – Steven Stamkos (3); 18:56 – pp – Ondrej Palat (3)
Max Pacioretty (5) – 15:03		Third period	17:59 – en – Nikita Kucherov (6)
Carey Price 24 saves / 27 shots		Goalie stats	Ben Bishop 18 saves / 19 shots

Tampa Bay won series 4–2

==== (M1) New York Rangers vs. (M2) Washington Capitals ====
This was the ninth playoff meeting for these teams, and their fifth in the last seven years; the teams have split their eight previous playoff series. Their most recent meeting was in the 2013 Eastern Conference quarterfinals, which New York won in seven games. New York won three of the four games in the regular season series.

The Rangers overcame a 3–1 series deficit to eliminate the Capitals in seven games. Joel Ward scored with 1.3 seconds left to give Washington a 2–1 win in game one. The Rangers took game two, 3–2, as Chris Kreider and Dan Boyle recorded first-period goals and Henrik Lundqvist stopped 30 out of 32 shots. In game three, Braden Holtby stopped all of the Rangers' 30 shots, and Jay Beagle's second-period goal helped give the Capitals a 1–0 win. Holtby then made 29 out of 30 saves in game four, while rookie Andre Burakovsky scored his first two postseason goals in a 2–1 victory for Washington. In game five, the Capitals appeared to have scored the icebreaker with 2:09 left in the second period when Matt Niskanen's shot went past Lundqvist, but officials waved off the goal and ruled that Ward interfered with the Rangers goalie. Curtis Glencross would later score the icebreaker for Washington at 10:54 of the third period. But Kreider scored with 1:41 remaining in regulation to tie the game, 1–1, then Ryan McDonagh won it at 9:37 into overtime to give the Rangers a 2–1 victory. Game six saw Kreider score two first-period goals to help the Rangers build a 4–1 lead in the third period before holding off a late comeback by the Capitals to win 4–3. Then in game seven, Derek Stepan scored at 11:24 into overtime on a set play off the faceoff to give the Rangers a 2–1 victory and the 4–3 series win to move on to the Eastern Conference Final for the second time in as many years. This was also the second consecutive playoffs in which the Rangers were able to overcome a 3–1 series deficit, an NHL first. As well, this was only the second time the Rangers overcame a 3–1 series deficit in franchise history, as well as the second series in NHL playoffs history to comprise seven games decided by a one-goal margin, after the Capitals' upset of the Bruins in the first round of the 2012 playoffs. With this series loss, the Capitals fell to 6–5 all-time in series when they lead 3–1, with this fifth loss becoming most among NHL teams.

April 30	Washington Capitals	2–1	New York Rangers	Madison Square Garden	Recap
Alex Ovechkin (3) – pp – 18:13		First period	No scoring
No scoring		Second period	No scoring
Joel Ward (2) – 19:58		Third period	15:21 – Jesper Fast (1)
Braden Holtby 31 saves / 32 shots		Goalie stats	Henrik Lundqvist 27 saves / 29 shots

May 2	Washington Capitals	2–3	New York Rangers	Madison Square Garden	Recap
No scoring		First period	00:38 – Chris Kreider (2); 15:40 – pp – Dan Boyle (1)
Evgeny Kuznetsov (4) – 13:59		Second period	No scoring
Alex Ovechkin (4) – 10:29		Third period	06:07 – Derick Brassard (4)
Braden Holtby 32 saves / 35 shots		Goalie stats	Henrik Lundqvist 30 saves / 32 shots

May 4	New York Rangers	0–1	Washington Capitals	Verizon Center	Recap
No scoring		First period	No scoring
No scoring		Second period	07:31 – Jay Beagle (1)
No scoring		Third period	No scoring
Henrik Lundqvist 21 saves / 22 shots		Goalie stats	Braden Holtby 30 saves / 30 shots

May 6	New York Rangers	1–2	Washington Capitals	Verizon Center	Recap
No scoring		First period	No scoring
Derick Brassard (5) – 06:12		Second period	16:29 – Andre Burakovsky (1)
No scoring		Third period	00:24 – Andre Burakovsky (2)
Henrik Lundqvist 28 saves / 30 shots		Goalie stats	Braden Holtby 28 saves / 29 shots

May 8	Washington Capitals	1–2	OT	New York Rangers	Madison Square Garden	Recap
No scoring		First period		No scoring
No scoring		Second period		No scoring
Curtis Glencross (1) – 10:54		Third period		18:19 – Chris Kreider (3)
No scoring		First overtime period		09:37 – Ryan McDonagh (2)
Braden Holtby 41 saves / 43 shots		Goalie stats		Henrik Lundqvist 28 saves / 29 shots

May 10	New York Rangers	4–3	Washington Capitals	Verizon Center	Recap
Chris Kreider (4) – 00:40; Chris Kreider (5) – pp – 19:59		First period	No scoring
No scoring		Second period	00:28 – Jason Chimera (3)
Rick Nash (2) – 00:54; Dan Boyle (2) – 04:24		Third period	07:40 – Evgeny Kuznetsov (5); 10:33 – Joel Ward (3)
Henrik Lundqvist 42 saves / 45 shots		Goalie stats	Braden Holtby 24 saves / 28 shots

May 13	Washington Capitals	1–2	OT	New York Rangers	Madison Square Garden	Recap
Alex Ovechkin (5) – 12:50		First period		No scoring
No scoring		Second period		06:22 – pp – Kevin Hayes (2)
No scoring		Third period		No scoring
No scoring		First overtime period		11:24 – Derek Stepan (3)
Braden Holtby 37 saves / 39 shots		Goalie stats		Henrik Lundqvist 35 saves / 36 shots

New York won series 4–3

=== Western Conference second round ===
==== (C3) Chicago Blackhawks vs. (WC1) Minnesota Wild ====
This was the third year in a row in which the Blackhawks and Wild had met in the postseason, and their third meeting overall. The Blackhawks won both previous series, their most recent meeting was in the previous year's Western Conference Second Round where Chicago won in six games. Chicago won three of the five games in the regular season series.

The Blackhawks swept the Wild. In game one, after Chicago scored three unanswered first-period goals, followed by Minnesota scoring three of their own to tie the game, Teuvo Teravainen scored with 59 seconds left in the second period to help give the Blackhawks a 4–3 win. Patrick Kane then scored two goals in game two to help give Chicago a 4–1 victory. In game three, Corey Crawford stopped all of Minnesota's 30 shots, and Kane's power play goal in the first period helped give the Blackhawks a 1–0 win. Chicago then won game four, 4–3, with four different Blackhawks recording goals, but had to hold off an attempted comeback by Minnesota, who scored two goals 51 seconds apart in the final minutes of the game.

May 1	Minnesota Wild	3–4	Chicago Blackhawks	United Center	Recap
No scoring		First period	01:15 – Brandon Saad (3); 13:11 – Patrick Kane (3); 15:15 – Marcus Kruger (1)
Jason Zucker (2) – 01:21; Zach Parise (4) – pp – 05:07; Mikael Granlund (2) – 09:30		Second period	19:01 – Teuvo Teravainen (1)
No scoring		Third period	No scoring
Devan Dubnyk 31 saves / 35 shots		Goalie stats	Corey Crawford 30 saves / 33 shots

May 3	Minnesota Wild	1–4	Chicago Blackhawks	United Center	Recap
No scoring		First period	No scoring
No scoring		Second period	12:28 – sh – Jonathan Toews (4); 19:40 – Patrick Kane (4)
Matt Dumba (2) – pp – 01:20		Third period	07:39 – Patrick Sharp (4); 17:53 – en – Patrick Kane (5)
Devan Dubnyk 27 saves / 30 shots		Goalie stats	Corey Crawford 30 saves / 31 shots

May 5	Chicago Blackhawks	1–0	Minnesota Wild	Xcel Energy Center	Recap
Patrick Kane (6) – pp – 14:06		First period	No scoring
No scoring		Second period	No scoring
No scoring		Third period	No scoring
Corey Crawford 30 saves / 30 shots		Goalie stats	Devan Dubnyk 21 saves / 22 shots

May 7	Chicago Blackhawks	4–3	Minnesota Wild	Xcel Energy Center	Recap
Brent Seabrook (3) – 10:23		First period	No scoring
Andrew Shaw (1) – pp – 03:28		Second period	06:42 – Erik Haula (1)
Patrick Kane (7) – 13:20; Marian Hossa (1) – en – 16:53		Third period	17:42 – pp – Jason Pominville (3); 18:33 – Nino Niederreiter (4)
Corey Crawford 34 saves / 37 shots		Goalie stats	Devan Dubnyk 21 saves / 24 shots

Chicago won series 4–0

==== (P1) Anaheim Ducks vs. (P3) Calgary Flames ====
This was the second playoff meeting between these teams; their only previous meeting was in the 2006 Western Conference quarterfinals, which Anaheim won in seven games. Anaheim won three of the five games in the regular season series.

The Ducks eliminated the Flames in five games. Anaheim took game one, 6–1, scoring three goals apiece against both Calgary starting goalie Jonas Hiller and backup Karri Ramo. Flames coach Bob Hartley then decided to start Ramo for the rest of the series. In game two, Ducks goalie Frederik Andersen stopped all of Calgary's 30 shots in a 3–0 victory. In game three, Anaheim held a 3–2 lead in the third period when Sam Bennett appeared to have tied the game with 6:22 left in regulation, but officials said no goal on the ice and video review ruled that it was inconclusive as to whether the puck completely crossed the goal line. However, with 19.5 seconds remaining in regulation, and the Flames on essentially a 5-on-3 advantage because of pulling their goalie for an extra attacker, coincidental minors against both teams, and a delay of game penalty on Sami Vatanen of Anaheim, Johnny Gaudreau scored to tie the game. Then at 4:24 of overtime, Mikael Backlund scored his first postseason goal on a delayed penalty to give Calgary the win, 4–3. The Ducks responded with a 4–2 win in game four, as a high-sticking double minor penalty on Calgary's Joe Colborne at the end of the second period led to Matt Beleskey's power play goal to give Anaheim a 3–2 lead, followed by Patrick Maroon's empty netter. In game five, Corey Perry scored 2:26 into overtime, giving the Ducks the series win.

April 30	Calgary Flames	1–6	Anaheim Ducks	Honda Center	Recap
No scoring		First period	10:17 – Matt Beleskey (1); 13:11 – Patrick Maroon (2)
No scoring		Second period	02:13 – Corey Perry (4); 10:11 – Emerson Etem (2)
Sam Bennett (3) – 09:16		Third period	00:44 – pp – Corey Perry (5); 02:32 – pp – Ryan Getzlaf (2)
Jonas Hiller 11 saves / 14 shots Karri Ramo 18 saves / 21 shots		Goalie stats	Frederik Andersen 23 saves / 24 shots

May 3	Calgary Flames	0–3	Anaheim Ducks	Honda Center	Recap
No scoring		First period	07:27 – Matt Beleskey (2)
No scoring		Second period	No scoring
No scoring		Third period	11:15 – Hampus Lindholm (1); 17:44 – en – Nate Thompson (1)
Karri Ramo 31 saves / 33 shots		Goalie stats	Frederik Andersen 30 saves / 30 shots

May 5	Anaheim Ducks	3–4	OT	Calgary Flames	Scotiabank Saddledome	Recap
Patrick Maroon (3) – 06:57; Corey Perry (6) – 14:10		First period		02:07 – Brandon Bollig (2)
Matt Beleskey (3) – 08:20		Second period		04:17 – sh – Joe Colborne (1)
No scoring		Third period		19:40 – pp – Johnny Gaudreau (3)
No scoring		First overtime period		04:24 – Mikael Backlund (1)
Frederik Andersen 17 saves / 21 shots		Goalie stats		Karri Ramo 18 saves / 21 shots

May 8	Anaheim Ducks	4–2	Calgary Flames	Scotiabank Saddledome	Recap
Jakob Silfverberg (3) – pp – 03:58		First period	04:37 – Sean Monahan (3); 05:44 – Micheal Ferland (3)
Andrew Cogliano (2) – 16:42		Second period	No scoring
Matt Beleskey (4) – pp – 01:11; Patrick Maroon (4) – en – 19:23		Third period	No scoring
Frederik Andersen 25 saves / 27 shots		Goalie stats	Karri Ramo 25 saves / 28 shots

May 10	Calgary Flames	2–3	OT	Anaheim Ducks	Honda Center	Recap
Jiri Hudler (4) – pp – 10:43		First period		No scoring
Johnny Gaudreau (4) – 05:55		Second period		04:59 – pp – Ryan Kesler (4)
No scoring		Third period		00:59 – pp – Matt Beleskey (5)
No scoring		First overtime period		02:26 – Corey Perry (7)
Karri Ramo 44 saves / 47 shots		Goalie stats		Frederik Andersen 17 saves / 19 shots

Anaheim won series 4–1

== Conference finals ==
=== Eastern Conference final ===
==== (M1) New York Rangers vs. (A2) Tampa Bay Lightning ====
This was the first playoff meeting between these teams. This was the Rangers' second consecutive Conference finals appearance, and their third overall in the last four years; they defeated the Montreal Canadiens in six games in the previous year. Tampa Bay most recently made it to the conference finals in 2011, where they lost in seven games to the Boston Bruins. Tampa Bay won all three games in the regular season series.

The Lightning defeated the Rangers in seven games. In game one, Dominic Moore scored with 2:25 left to give the Rangers a 2–1 win. Tyler Johnson then recorded a hat trick, scoring a shorthanded, a power play and an even strength goal, as he led the Lightning to a 6–2 victory in game two. In game three, Nikita Kucherov scored 3:33 into overtime to give Tampa Bay a 6–5 win. The Rangers then responded with a 5–1 win in game four, as Rick Nash scored twice and Henrik Lundqvist stopped 38 out of 39 shots. Ben Bishop shut out the Rangers in game five, stopping all 26 shots in the Lightning's 2–0 win. In game six, Derick Brassard recorded a hat trick and two assists as the Rangers went on to win, 7–3. Game seven, however, saw Tampa Bay record another 2–0 victory to eliminate the Rangers — the first time the Rangers had lost a game seven at home in their history (and the first time they lost an elimination game at home since the 2007 playoffs) — as Bishop stopped all 22 New York shots while the Lightning scored two goals out of their first three third-period shots.

May 16	Tampa Bay Lightning	1–2	New York Rangers	Madison Square Garden	Recap
No scoring		First period	No scoring
No scoring		Second period	19:47 – Derek Stepan (4)
Ondrej Palat (4) – pp – 06:45		Third period	17:35 – Dominic Moore (1)
Ben Bishop 28 saves / 30 shots		Goalie stats	Henrik Lundqvist 23 saves / 24 shots

May 18	Tampa Bay Lightning	6–2	New York Rangers	Madison Square Garden	Recap
Tyler Johnson (9) – sh – 05:38; Tyler Johnson (10) – pp – 11:15		First period	08:50 – pp – Chris Kreider (6)
Tyler Johnson (11) – 08:17		Second period	14:17 – pp – Derek Stepan (5)
Alex Killorn (4) – 03:09; Steven Stamkos (4) – pp – 06:28; Alex Killorn (5) – pp – 17:58		Third period	No scoring
Ben Bishop 35 saves / 37 shots		Goalie stats	Henrik Lundqvist 20 saves / 26 shots

May 20	New York Rangers	5–6	OT	Tampa Bay Lightning	Amalie Arena	Recap
Derick Brassard (6) – pp – 01:02; Jesper Fast (2) – 09:55		First period		11:07 – Steven Stamkos (5)
Jesper Fast (3) – 17:47		Second period		10:32 – pp – Ondrej Palat (5); 13:17 – Tyler Johnson (12); 17:18 – Alex Killorn (6)
Ryan McDonagh (3) – pp – 02:28; Dan Boyle (3) – 18:04		Third period		14:15 – Ondrej Palat (6)
No scoring		First overtime period		03:33 – Nikita Kucherov (7)
Henrik Lundqvist 34 saves / 40 shots		Goalie stats		Ben Bishop 23 saves / 28 shots

May 22	New York Rangers	5–1	Tampa Bay Lightning	Amalie Arena	Recap
Rick Nash (3) – 12:18		First period	No scoring
Chris Kreider (7) – 15:16; Keith Yandle (1) – 17:04		Second period	11:30 – Steven Stamkos (6)
Martin St. Louis (1) – pp – 05:08; Rick Nash (4) – pp – 12:18		Third period	No scoring
Henrik Lundqvist 38 saves / 39 shots		Goalie stats	Ben Bishop 19 saves / 24 shots

May 24	Tampa Bay Lightning	2–0	New York Rangers	Madison Square Garden	Recap
No scoring		First period	No scoring
Valtteri Filppula (3) – 13:29; Steven Stamkos (7) – pp – 18:22		Second period	No scoring
No scoring		Third period	No scoring
Ben Bishop 26 saves / 26 shots		Goalie stats	Henrik Lundqvist 20 saves / 22 shots

May 26	New York Rangers	7–3	Tampa Bay Lightning	Amalie Arena	Recap
Derick Brassard (7) – 03:36; Keith Yandle (2) – 15:30		First period	17:20 – pp – Ryan Callahan (1)
No scoring		Second period	No scoring
J. T. Miller (1) – 03:02; James Sheppard (1) – 06:00; Derick Brassard (8) – 07:14; Rick Nash (5) – pp – 10:21; Derick Brassard (9) – en – 18:19		Third period	07:50 – Nikita Kucherov (8); 13:21 – Nikita Kucherov (9)
Henrik Lundqvist 36 saves / 39 shots		Goalie stats	Ben Bishop 21 saves / 26 shots Andrei Vasilevskiy 6 saves / 7 shots

May 29	Tampa Bay Lightning	2–0	New York Rangers	Madison Square Garden	Recap
No scoring		First period	No scoring
No scoring		Second period	No scoring
Alex Killorn (7) – 01:54; Ondrej Palat (7) – 11:17		Third period	No scoring
Ben Bishop 22 saves / 22 shots		Goalie stats	Henrik Lundqvist 23 saves / 25 shots

Tampa Bay won series 4–3

=== Western Conference final ===
==== (P1) Anaheim Ducks vs. (C3) Chicago Blackhawks ====
This was the first playoff meeting between these teams. Anaheim most recently made it to the conference finals in 2007, when they defeated the Detroit Red Wings in six games. This was Chicago's third consecutive Conference finals appearance, and their fifth overall in the last seven years; they were defeated by the Los Angeles Kings in seven games in the previous year. Chicago won two of the three games in the regular season series.

The Blackhawks eliminated the Ducks in seven games. Anaheim took game one, 4–1, getting goals from four different players and Frederik Andersen stopping 26 out of 27 shots. Game two was the longest game in Chicago franchise history as Marcus Kruger scored 16:12 into triple-overtime to give the Blackhawks a 3–2 victory. Anaheim defeated Chicago in game three, 2–1, as Simon Despres' first career Stanley Cup playoff goal with 55 seconds left in the second period proved to be the difference. In game four, a total of six goals were scored during the third period. After the period began with a 1–1 tie, the Blackhawks scored two consecutive goals, followed by the Ducks scoring three in 37 seconds, before Patrick Kane's power play goal tied it again at 4–4. The contest ended when Antoine Vermette scored at 5:37 of double overtime to give Chicago a 5–4 victory. The Ducks built a 3–0 first period lead before Chicago scored two in the second to cut the score to 3–2. Patrick Maroon scored at 14:45 of the third period to increase Anaheim's lead to 4–2, but Jonathan Toews scored twice inside the final two minutes of regulation to tie the game and force overtime. This time, Matt Beleskey scored 45 seconds into the extra period to give the Ducks the 5–4 victory. But in game six, the Blackhawks built a 3–0 second-period lead, with Duncan Keith recording an assist in each of those three goals, en route to a 5–2 win. And in game seven, Toews scored twice as Chicago built a 4–0 second-period lead en route to a 5–3 victory.

May 17	Chicago Blackhawks	1–4	Anaheim Ducks	Honda Center	Recap
No scoring		First period	08:48 – Hampus Lindholm (2)
Brad Richards (2) – 19:20		Second period	04:17 – Kyle Palmieri (1)
No scoring		Third period	12:05 – Nate Thompson (2); 18:42 – en – Jakob Silfverberg (4)
Corey Crawford 20 saves / 23 shots		Goalie stats	Frederik Andersen 26 saves / 27 shots

May 19	Chicago Blackhawks	3–2	3OT	Anaheim Ducks	Honda Center	Recap
Andrew Shaw (2) – pp – 02:14; Marian Hossa (2) – pp – 06:19		First period		09:14 – Andrew Cogliano (3)
No scoring		Second period		17:30 – Corey Perry (8)
No scoring		Third period		No scoring
Marcus Kruger (2) – 16:12		Third overtime period		No scoring
Corey Crawford 60 saves / 62 shots		Goalie stats		Frederik Andersen 53 saves / 56 shots

May 21	Anaheim Ducks	2–1	Chicago Blackhawks	United Center	Recap
Patrick Maroon (5) – pp – 12:55		First period	19:03 – Patrick Kane (8)
Simon Despres (1) – 19:05		Second period	No scoring
No scoring		Third period	No scoring
Frederik Andersen 27 saves / 28 shots		Goalie stats	Corey Crawford 25 saves / 27 shots

May 23	Anaheim Ducks	4–5	2OT	Chicago Blackhawks	United Center	Recap
No scoring		First period		19:13 – sh – Brandon Saad (4)
Emerson Etem (3) – 18:14		Second period		No scoring
Ryan Kesler (5) – 08:42; Matt Beleskey (6) – 09:05; Corey Perry (9) – 09:19		Third period		02:38 – Jonathan Toews (5); 07:38 – Brent Seabrook (4); 12:39 – pp – Patrick Kane (9)
No scoring		Second overtime period		05:37 – Antoine Vermette (2)
Frederik Andersen 35 saves / 40 shots		Goalie stats		Corey Crawford 47 saves / 51 shots

May 25	Chicago Blackhawks	4–5	OT	Anaheim Ducks	Honda Center	Recap
No scoring		First period		05:10 – Cam Fowler (2); 05:42 – Ryan Kesler (6); 14:37 – Sami Vatanen (3)
Teuvo Teravainen (2) – 01:11; Brent Seabrook (5) – 19:35		Second period		No scoring
Jonathan Toews (6) – 18:10; Jonathan Toews (7) – 19:22		Third period		14:45 – Patrick Maroon (6)
No scoring		First overtime period		00:45 – Matt Beleskey (7)
Corey Crawford 23 saves / 28 shots		Goalie stats		Frederik Andersen 24 saves / 28 shots

May 27	Anaheim Ducks	2–5	Chicago Blackhawks	United Center	Recap
No scoring		First period	No scoring
Patrick Maroon (7) – pp – 14:13		Second period	08:23 – Brandon Saad (5); 10:41 – Marian Hossa (3); 12:08 – Patrick Kane (10)
Clayton Stoner (1) – 01:57		Third period	16:28 – Andrew Shaw (3); 19:11 – en – Andrew Shaw (4)
Frederik Andersen 18 saves / 22 shots		Goalie stats	Corey Crawford 30 saves / 32 shots

May 30	Chicago Blackhawks	5–3	Anaheim Ducks	Honda Center	Recap
Jonathan Toews (8) – 02:23; Jonathan Toews (9) – pp – 11:55		First period	No scoring
Brandon Saad (6) – 01:18; Marian Hossa (4) – 13:45		Second period	18:51 – Ryan Kesler (7)
Brent Seabrook (6) – pp – 13:23		Third period	11:36 – Corey Perry (10); 19:18 – pp – Matt Beleskey (8)
Corey Crawford 35 saves / 38 shots		Goalie stats	Frederik Andersen 21 saves / 26 shots

Chicago won series 4–3

== Stanley Cup Finals ==
This was the first playoff meeting between these two teams. Both teams won their last appearance in the Finals; Tampa Bay defeated Calgary in seven games in 2004, while Chicago defeated Boston in six games in 2013. This was the Lightning's second appearance in the Finals; the Blackhawks made their thirteenth Finals appearance, and their third in six years. Upon winning the Finals, Chicago had won three Stanley Cups in the past six years. This was also the first Stanley Cup Finals not to have a game go into overtime since 2009.

June 3	Chicago Blackhawks	2–1	Tampa Bay Lightning	Amalie Arena	Recap
No scoring		First period	04:31 – Alex Killorn (8)
No scoring		Second period	No scoring
Teuvo Teravainen (3) – 13:28; Antoine Vermette (3) – 15:26		Third period	No scoring
Corey Crawford 22 saves / 23 shots		Goalie stats	Ben Bishop 19 saves / 21 shots

June 6	Chicago Blackhawks	3–4	Tampa Bay Lightning	Amalie Arena	Recap
No scoring		First period	12:56 – Cedric Paquette (2)
Andrew Shaw (5) – 03:04; Teuvo Teravainen (4) – pp – 05:20		Second period	06:52 – Nikita Kucherov (10); 13:58 – Tyler Johnson (13)
Brent Seabrook (7) – 03:38		Third period	08:49 – pp – Jason Garrison (2)
Corey Crawford 20 saves / 24 shots		Goalie stats	Ben Bishop 21 saves / 24 shots Andrei Vasilevskiy 5 saves / 5 shots

June 8	Tampa Bay Lightning	3–2	Chicago Blackhawks	United Center	Recap
Ryan Callahan (2) – 05:09		First period	14:22 – pp – Brad Richards (3)
No scoring		Second period	No scoring
Ondrej Palat (8) – 04:27; Cedric Paquette (3) – 16:49		Third period	04:14 – Brandon Saad (7)
Ben Bishop 36 saves / 38 shots		Goalie stats	Corey Crawford 29 saves / 32 shots

June 10	Tampa Bay Lightning	1–2	Chicago Blackhawks	United Center	Recap
No scoring		First period	No scoring
Alex Killorn (9) – 11:47		Second period	06:40 – Jonathan Toews (10)
No scoring		Third period	06:22 – Brandon Saad (8)
Andrei Vasilevskiy 17 saves / 19 shots		Goalie stats	Corey Crawford 24 saves / 25 shots

June 13	Chicago Blackhawks	2–1	Tampa Bay Lightning	Amalie Arena	Recap
Patrick Sharp (5) – 06:11		First period	No scoring
No scoring		Second period	10:53 – Valtteri Filppula (4)
Antoine Vermette (4) – 02:00		Third period	No scoring
Corey Crawford 31 saves / 32 shots		Goalie stats	Ben Bishop 27 saves / 29 shots

June 15	Tampa Bay Lightning	0–2	Chicago Blackhawks	United Center	Recap
No scoring		First period	No scoring
No scoring		Second period	17:13 – Duncan Keith (3)
No scoring		Third period	14:46 – Patrick Kane (11)
Ben Bishop 30 saves / 32 shots		Goalie stats	Corey Crawford 25 saves / 25 shots

Chicago won series 4–2

== Player statistics ==
=== Skaters ===
These are the top ten skaters based on points.

Player	Team	GP	G	A	Pts	+/–	PIM
Tyler Johnson	Tampa Bay Lightning	26	13	10	23	+7	24
Patrick Kane	Chicago Blackhawks	23	11	12	23	+7	0
Nikita Kucherov	Tampa Bay Lightning	26	10	12	22	+7	14
Jonathan Toews	Chicago Blackhawks	23	10	11	21	+7	8
Duncan Keith	Chicago Blackhawks	23	3	18	21	+16	4
Ryan Getzlaf	Anaheim Ducks	16	2	18	20	+6	6
Corey Perry	Anaheim Ducks	16	10	8	18	+6	14
Alex Killorn	Tampa Bay Lightning	26	9	9	18	+3	12
Steven Stamkos	Tampa Bay Lightning	26	7	11	18	+2	20
Jakob Silfverberg	Anaheim Ducks	16	4	14	18	+6	16

=== Goaltenders ===
This is a combined table of the top five goaltenders based on goals against average and the top five goaltenders based on save percentage, with at least 420 minutes played. The table is sorted by GAA, and the criteria for inclusion are bolded.

Player	Team	GP	W	L	SA	GA	GAA	SV%	SO	TOI
Braden Holtby	Washington Capitals	13	6	7	412	23	**1.71**	**.944**	1	805:43
Henrik Lundqvist	New York Rangers	19	11	8	570	41	**2.11**	**.928**	0	1166:10
Ben Bishop	Tampa Bay Lightning	25	13	11	669	53	**2.18**	**.921**	3	1458:58
Carey Price	Montreal Canadiens	12	6	6	352	28	**2.23**	**.920**	1	751:43
Corey Crawford	Chicago Blackhawks	20	13	6	616	47	**2.31**	**.924**	2	1222:57

== Television ==
This was the first postseason under Rogers Media' 12-year contract for Canadian television and digital media rights. On television, national coverage of playoff games aired across Sportsnet, SN1, SN360, FX, and CBC (through Hockey Night in Canada). French-language coverage of all games was carried by TVA Sports. Selected games were simulcast with Punjabi-language commentary on Omni Television.

In the United States, national coverage of playoff games aired on either NBC, NBCSN, CNBC, NHL Network, or USA Network. USA Network broadcast NHL games for the first time since they aired them from 1979 to 1985. During the first round, these national telecasts co-existed with those of regional rightsholders, after which NBC had exclusive rights to the remaining games. Seven first-round games were televised exclusively in the U.S. on NBC.

In Canada, first-round viewership improved over the previous season, with one of the games in the Montreal-Ottawa series on CBC seen by 3.76 million viewers. However, following the elimination of Canadian teams from contention and an all-U.S. final, ratings dropped significantly, with Numeris estimating an overall decrease of 8% in average viewership on CBC, and a 14% decrease in average viewership for Sportsnet in comparison to TSN's 2014 playoff coverage. Game six of the Final, facing competition from a Team Canada match in the 2015 FIFA Women's World Cup on CTV and TSN, and the Toronto Blue Jays (in the midst of a major winning streak) on Sportsnet, was the lowest-rated deciding game since game seven in 2003.

By contrast, ratings in the United States were strong for NBC and its cable networks. This also extended to the Montreal-Ottawa first-round series, where it faced no competition from a U.S. regional rightsholder: games six and three of the all-Canadian series on NBCSN ended up being the top and the second-most watched first-round contests on U.S. cable, respectively. Game seven of the N.Y. Rangers-Tampa Bay Eastern Conference finals produced a 2.65 metered market overnight rating, making it NBCSN's second-highest rated non-Final NHL game. Game seven of the Anaheim-Chicago Western Conference finals then generated a 3.27 metered market rating, the highest rated non-Final overnight NHL game on NBC. During the Final, game six was seen by 7.6 million viewers nationally on NBC. Ratings for game six were especially strong in Chicago and Tampa Bay: it was the most-watched NHL broadcast locally in Chicago history, and the second-highest in Tampa Bay. Overall, it was the second-most-watched Stanley Cup Finals since 1995, averaging a 3.2 rating and 5.6 million viewers on NBC and NBCSN, trailing only the 2013 Stanley Cup Finals.

== Notes ==
Preceded by 2014 Stanley Cup playoffs	Stanley Cup playoffs 2015	Succeeded by 2016 Stanley Cup playoffs
