= Tyler Johnson (ice hockey) =

American ice hockey player (born 1990)

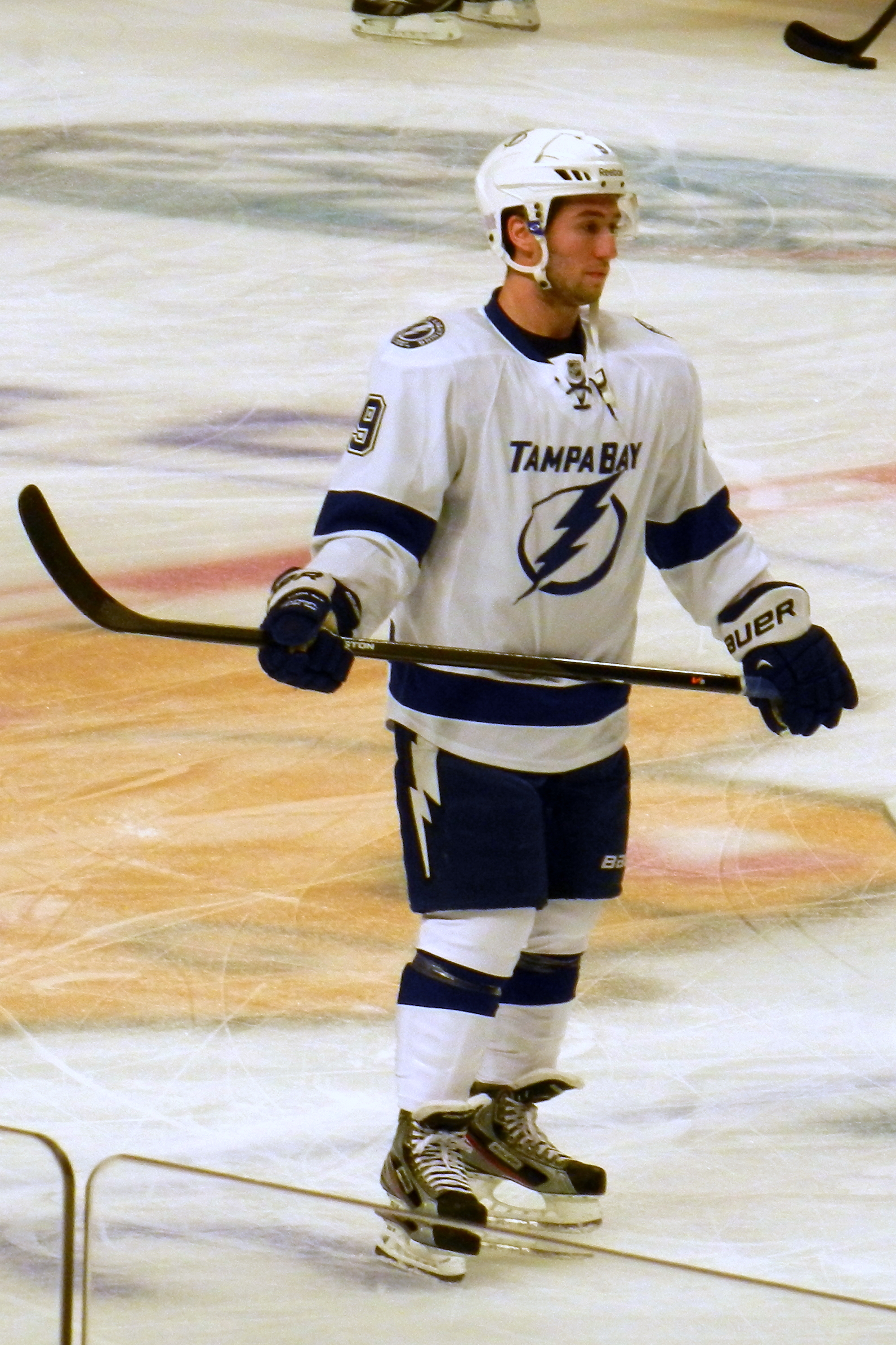
- Johnson with the Tampa Bay Lightning in October 2013
- Born: July 29, 1990 (age 36) Liberty Lake, Washington, U.S.
- Height: 5 ft 8 in (173 cm)
- Weight: 185 lb (84 kg; 13 st 3 lb)
- Position: Center
- Shot: Right
- Played for: Tampa Bay Lightning; Chicago Blackhawks; Boston Bruins
- National team: United States
- NHL draft: Undrafted
- Playing career: 2011–2024

Tyler Johnson (born July 29, 1990) is an American former professional all-star ice hockey forward. An undrafted player, Johnson spent the majority of his career with the Tampa Bay Lightning, with whom he won back-to-back Stanley Cup championships in 2020 and 2021. He also played three seasons for the Chicago Blackhawks, and briefly played for the Boston Bruins.

== Playing career ==
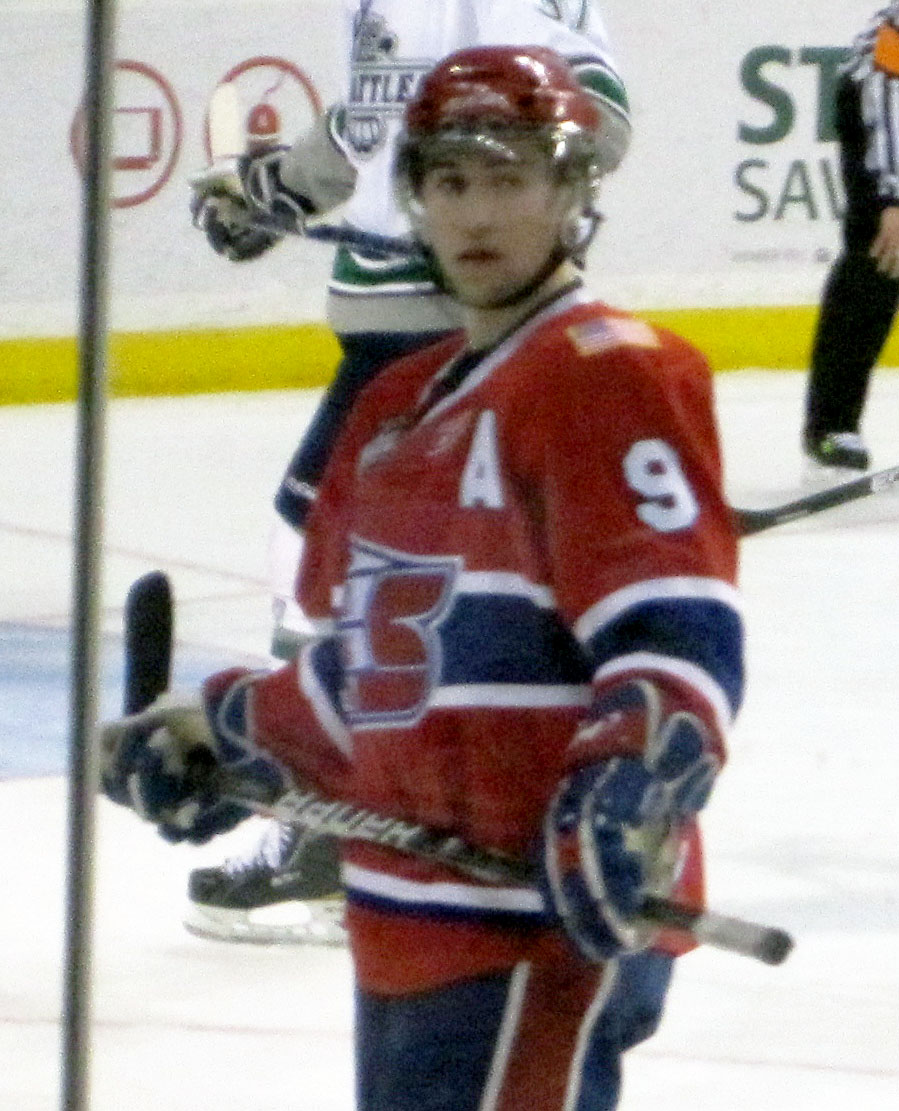
Johnson in February 2011. He played with the WHL's Spokane Chiefs for his major-junior ice hockey career.

=== Junior ===
Johnson was selected by the Spokane Chiefs with their 11th-round pick in the 2005 WHL Bantam Draft. In his first season with this team, in 2007–08, he appeared in 69 regular season games, scoring 13 goals and 29 assists. The Chiefs won the Ed Chynoweth Cup that season as the league's champions. The Chiefs subsequently earned a berth in the 2008 Memorial Cup, where they defeated the Kitchener Rangers by a score of 4–1. Johnson played in all 21 playoff games, scoring five goals and adding three assists. He was named the WHL playoffs' Most Valuable Player as a 17-year-old rookie.

In the 2008–09 season, Johnson played in 62 games, scoring 26 goals and 35 assists for 61 points and adding another five goals and three assists in 12 playoff games. The 2009–10 season saw Johnson's numbers improve, as he tallied 36 goals and 35 assists in 64 games. He also added three goals and five assists in seven playoff games.

Johnson's 2010–11 season proved to be his best yet as he became the 15th Chiefs' member of all-time to hit the century mark (100 points), with 53 goals and 62 assists, making him the leading goal scorer and second-leading points scorer in the WHL. He ultimately finished the season with career highs in goals (53), assists (62) and points (115), while also leading the team in power play and shorthanded goals and ranking third with a plus-27 ranking. He was named Player of the Month for the WHL for December 2010. He was also voted as the Best Overage Player, Top Defensive Forward, Best Skater and Top Faceoff Man, second in Most Valuable to Team and third in Most Accurate Shot in the Best of the West 2011 poll.

=== Tampa Bay Lightning (2013–2021) ===
Johnson signed a three-year, entry-level contract with the National Hockey League (NHL)'s Tampa Bay Lightning in March 2011. Johnson's smaller size was known to be the reason he went undrafted.

Johnson played the 2011–12 season with the Norfolk Admirals, the Lightning's top American Hockey League (AHL) affiliate. In March, he went on a 13-game scoring streak, including back-to-back two goal games, the longest streak by an AHL rookie in more than six years. This streak helped him earn the Reebok/AHL Player of the Month award for March 2012. Johnson was a key player in the Norfolk Admirals record winning streak of 28 games, which is a professional hockey league record. He was also a key player in Norfolk's only Calder Cup championship that season.

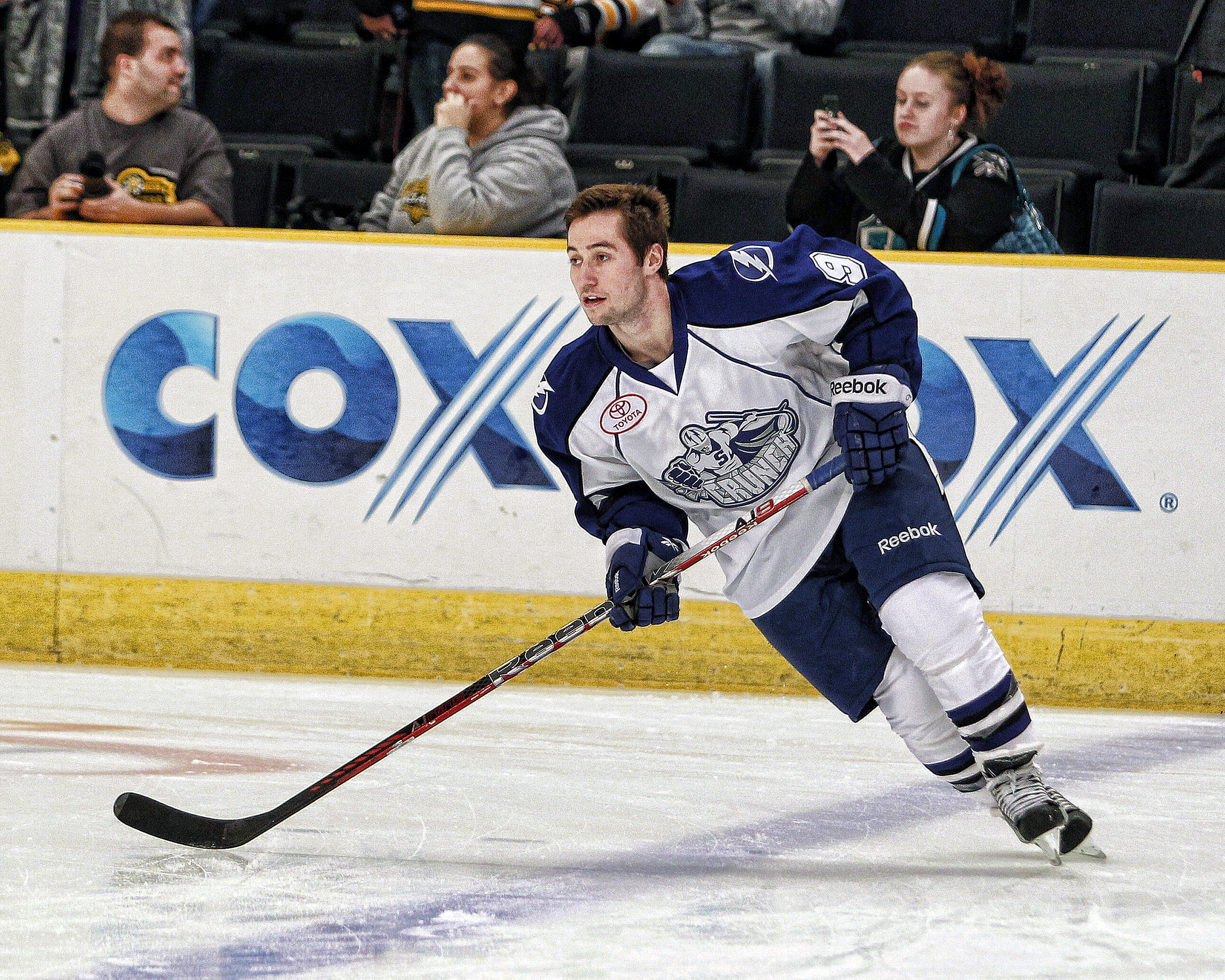
Johnson with the Syracuse Crunch in January 2013

In the 2012–13 season, Johnson would play the majority his time with Lightning's new AHL affiliate, the Syracuse Crunch. He would go on to lead the AHL in goals scored and named the regular season MVP. At the end of the season, he was awarded the President's Award for outstanding accomplishments on the ice. Johnson and the Crunch went on to go to the finals and would eventually lose to the Grand Rapids Griffins On March 14, 2013, he was called-up by the Lightning and made his NHL debut against the New York Islanders. He would score his first NHL goal in his second game on March 16 against the Carolina Hurricanes.

In his rookie NHL season with the Lightning in 2013–14, Johnson established himself on Tampa Bay's top offensive line and finished the season with 24 goals and 26 assists for 50 points in 82 games. He was selected as an NHL Calder Memorial Trophy nominee for the league's top rookie. However, the trophy was eventually awarded to Nathan MacKinnon of the Colorado Avalanche, though Johnson was named to the NHL All-Rookie Team.

The following season, 2014–15, Johnson followed up his breakout season in the NHL by scoring 29 goals and 43 assists for a total of 72 points in 77 games with the Lightning, finishing 15th overall in points in the NHL and playing on the second line with Nikita Kucherov and Ondřej Palát which was called "The Triplets" line by Lightning head coach Jon Cooper and the media. He also finished third in the NHL in plus-minus rating of plus-33 for the season, also being chosen for the 2014–15 NHL All-Star Game. On April 27, 2015, during the 2015 Stanley Cup playoffs, Johnson became the first player in Lightning history to record three multi-goal games in a single playoff series. He also tied Ruslan Fedotenko for the Lightning single series goals record, with six. On May 20, 2015, Johnson tied Fedotenko for most playoff goals in Lightning history. On May 18, Johnson became the first Lightning player to score a hat-trick in the playoffs, as well as the first to score a short-handed and power play goal in a single playoff period. He also set the Lightning multi-goal game record for the playoffs with his fourth of the 2015 playoffs. On June 6, Johnson scored his 13th goal of the playoffs, the highest output in a single playoff year by a Tampa Bay player. Early in the 2015 Stanley Cup Finals, Johnson suffered a broken wrist, but he continued to play through the injury. However, this prevented him from taking faceoffs and limited his production to just one goal.

On November 15, 2016, Johnson recorded his 100th career NHL assist on a goal scored by Nikita Kucherov. The assist came in a 4–3 Lightning win against the Detroit Red Wings at Joe Louis Arena. On February 19, 2017, Johnson recorded his 200th career NHL point, which came against the Dallas Stars at American Airlines Center. On February 23, 2017, Johnson played in his 300th career NHL game.

On July 10, 2017, Johnson signed a seven-year, $35 million contract extension with the Lightning worth $5 million annually. On October 24, 2017, Johnson recorded his 93rd career goal in a Lightning uniform, which moved him past Ryan Malone for tenth-most goals in franchise history. The goal came in a 5–1 Lightning win over the Carolina Hurricanes at PNC Arena. On December 29, 2017, Johnson recorded his 99th career NHL goal, which moved him past Chris Gratton for ninth-most goals in Lightning history. On December 31, 2017, Johnson recorded his 100th career NHL goal, which came in a 5–0 win over the Columbus Blue Jackets at Nationwide Arena. On March 22, 2018, Johnson recorded his 260th career NHL point. The point moved Johnson past Chris Gratton for tenth-most points in Lightning history. On October 16, 2018, Johnson recorded his fourth career regular season hat trick to help the Lightning to a 4–2 win over the visiting Carolina Hurricanes. Johnson's second goal of the night moved him past Brian Bradley for 8th most goals in franchise history with 112. On December 29, 2018, Johnson scored his 128th goal to move past Václav Prospal for seventh-most goals in Lightning history.

On December 28, 2019, Johnson skated in his 500th career NHL game against the Montreal Canadiens. On January 29, 2020, Johnson recorded his 151st career NHL goal to move past Brad Richards for fifth all-time in Lightning history.

On September 28, 2020, Johnson became the first Spokane area native to win the Stanley Cup after the Lightning defeated the Dallas Stars in six games in the Stanley Cup Finals.

Johnson and the Lightning would repeat as Stanley Cup Champions in 2021 after defeating the Montreal Canadiens in five games.

=== Chicago Blackhawks (2021–2024) ===
On July 27, 2021, Johnson was traded to the Chicago Blackhawks, along with a second-round pick in 2023, in exchange for the contract of Brent Seabrook. Johnson missed much of the 2021–22 campaign after sustaining a neck injury that required surgery and later suffering a concussion. He appeared in only 26 games for the Blackhawks that season, tallying only three goals and four assists while maintaining a 60.8 faceoff percentage.

=== Boston Bruins and retirement (2024–2025) ===
On August 31, 2024, the Boston Bruins signed Johnson to a professional tryout agreement. Just over two months later, on November 4, Johnson signed a one-year, $775,000 contract with Boston.

On December 19, 2024, the Bruins placed Johnson on unconditional waivers for the purpose of contract termination. He cleared waivers the following day and became an unrestricted free agent. Johnson recorded two assists in nine games during his tenure with the Bruins.

After going unsigned throughout the remainder of the season and start of the 2025 offseason, Johnson announced his retirement from hockey on July 7, 2025.

== International play ==
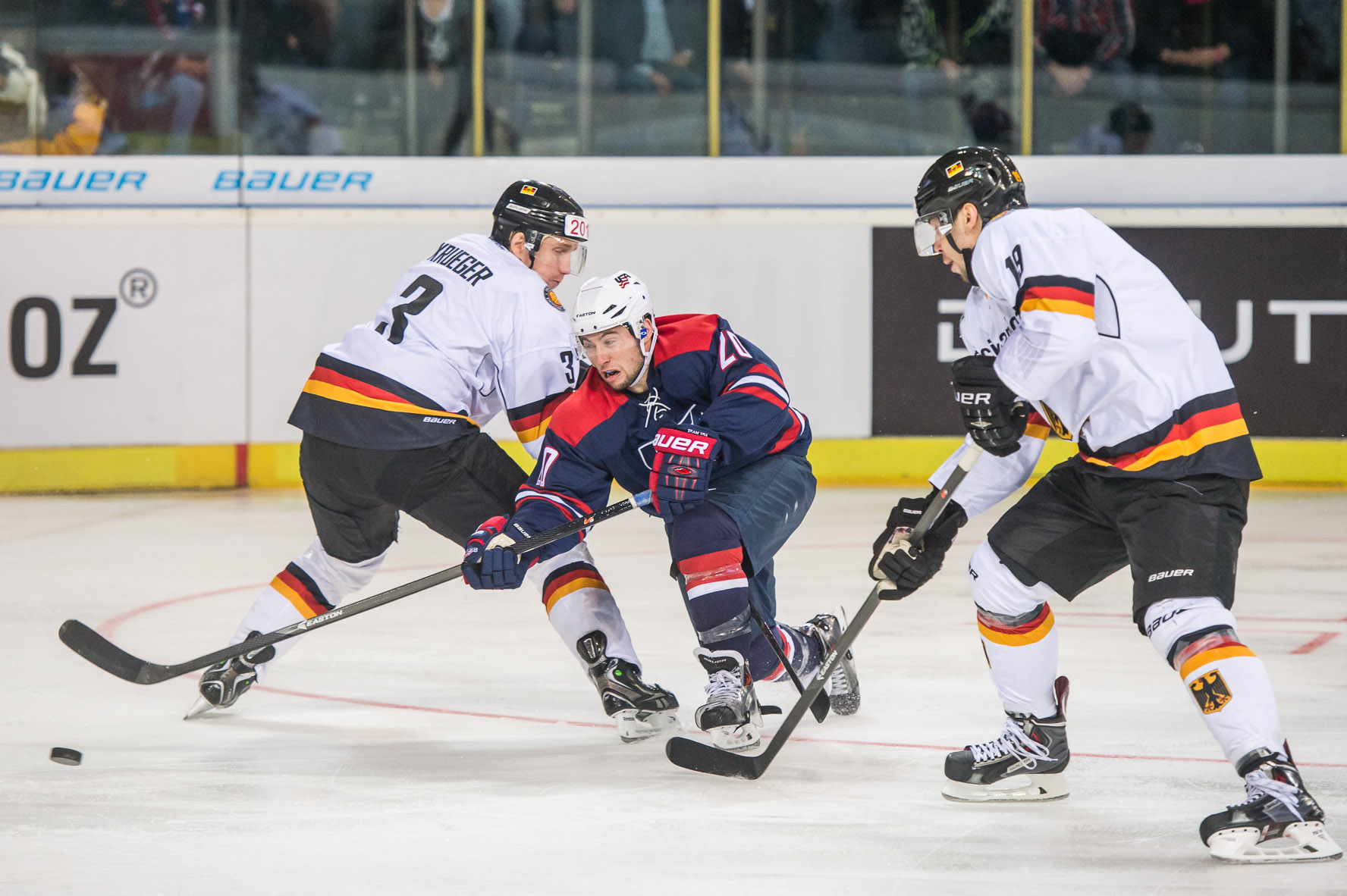
- Johnson (center) with the United States national men's ice hockey team in 2014

Medal record

Representing United States

Ice hockey

World Junior Championships
Gold medal – first place	2010 Saskatchewan	

Johnson has also excelled in international competition, helping the United States to the gold medal at the 2010 World Junior Championships in Canada, recording three goals and five points with a plus-four rating in seven games. He was named player of the game in their first-round game against Canada.

== Personal life ==
Tyler Johnson grew up in the Spokane suburb of Liberty Lake, Washington, where he graduated from Central Valley High School with honors. His parents, Ken and Debbie Johnson, met playing a rec-league hockey game at Spokane’s Eagle’s Ice-A-Rena. His mother Debbie was a skating coach who taught Tyler how to skate. He married his fiancée in August 2024.

== Career statistics ==
=== Regular season and playoffs ===
Bold indicates led league

			Regular season					Playoffs
Season	Team	League	GP	G	A	Pts	PIM	GP	G	A	Pts	PIM
2005–06	Coeur d'Alene Colts	NPHL	11	4	3	7	2	2	1	1	2	4
2006–07	Coeur d'Alene Lakers	NPHL	39	56	64	120	57	7	4	12	16	14
2007–08	Spokane Chiefs	WHL	69	13	22	35	34	21	5	3	8	24
2008–09	Spokane Chiefs	WHL	62	26	35	61	52	12	5	3	8	8
2009–10	Spokane Chiefs	WHL	64	36	35	71	32	7	3	5	8	0
2010–11	Spokane Chiefs	WHL	71	53	62	115	48	14	7	7	14	9
2011–12	Norfolk Admirals	AHL	75	38	37	78	28	14	6	8	14	6
2012–13	Syracuse Crunch	AHL	62	37	28	65	34	18	10	11	21	18
2012–13	Tampa Bay Lightning	NHL	14	3	3	6	4	—	—	—	—	—
2013–14	Tampa Bay Lightning	NHL	82	24	26	50	26	4	1	1	2	0
2014–15	Tampa Bay Lightning	NHL	77	29	43	72	24	26	**13**	10	**23**	24
2015–16	Tampa Bay Lightning	NHL	69	14	24	38	20	17	7	10	17	12
2016–17	Tampa Bay Lightning	NHL	66	19	26	45	28	—	—	—	—	—
2017–18	Tampa Bay Lightning	NHL	81	21	29	50	24	17	3	5	8	6
2018–19	Tampa Bay Lightning	NHL	80	29	18	47	28	4	0	1	1	0
2019–20	Tampa Bay Lightning	NHL	65	14	17	31	16	25	4	3	7	11
2020–21	Tampa Bay Lightning	NHL	55	8	14	22	16	23	4	3	7	0
2021–22	Chicago Blackhawks	NHL	26	3	4	7	12	—	—	—	—	—
2022–23	Chicago Blackhawks	NHL	56	12	20	32	16	—	—	—	—	—
2023–24	Chicago Blackhawks	NHL	67	17	14	31	26	—	—	—	—	—
2024–25	Boston Bruins	NHL	9	0	2	2	10	—	—	—	—	—
NHL totals			747	193	240	433	250	116	32	33	65	53

=== International ===
Year	Team	Event	Result	GP	G	A	Pts	PIM
2009	United States	WJC	5th	6	1	0	1	2
2010	United States	WJC	1st place, gold medalist(s)	7	3	2	5	25
2014	United States	WC	6th	8	6	3	9	2
Junior totals				13	4	2	6	27
Senior totals				8	6	3	9	2

== Awards and honors ==
Award	Year	Ref
WHL
Playoff MVP	2008	
WHL champion	2008	
Memorial Cup champion	2008	
West First All-Star Team	2011	
Most Goals (53)	2011	
Brad Hornung Trophy	2011	
West Player of the Year	2011	
AHL
All-Rookie Team	2012	
Calder Cup champion	2012	
First All-Star Team	2013	
All-Star Game	2013	
Willie Marshall Award	2013	
Les Cunningham Award	2013	
President's Award	2013	
NHL
NHL All-Rookie Team	2014	
NHL All-Star Game	2015	
Stanley Cup champion	2020, 2021	
