= Jonas Hiller =

Swiss ice hockey player (born 1982)

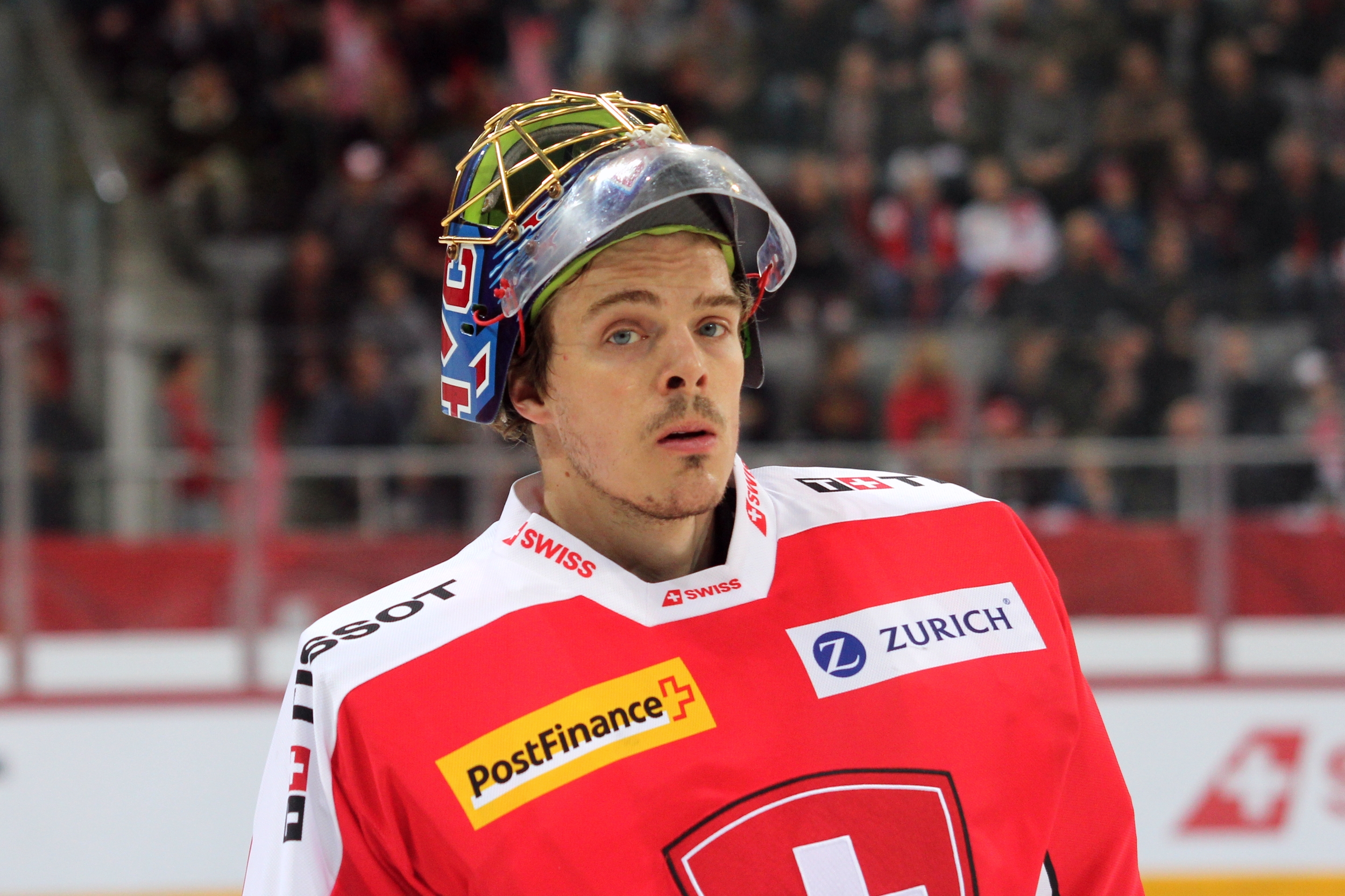
- Hiller in 2017
- Born: 12 February 1982 (age 44) Felben-Wellhausen, Switzerland
- Height: 6 ft 2 in (188 cm)
- Weight: 192 lb (87 kg; 13 st 10 lb)
- Position: Goaltender
- Caught: Right
- Played for: HC Davos; HC Lausanne; HC La Chaux-de-Fonds; Anaheim Ducks; Calgary Flames; EHC Biel
- National team: Switzerland
- NHL draft: Undrafted
- Playing career: 2001–2020

Jonas Hiller (born 12 February 1982) is a Swiss former professional ice hockey goaltender. Hiller played in the National Hockey League (NHL) for the Anaheim Ducks and the Calgary Flames. He began his NHL career with the Ducks in 2007 after going undrafted in any NHL entry draft. Hiller also played in the National League (NL) for HC Davos and EHC Biel.

== Playing career ==
As a youth, Hiller played in the 1996 Quebec International Pee-Wee Hockey Tournament with a team from Zürich.

While playing for HC Davos, Hiller won Switzerland's championship in 2002, 2005 and 2007, as well as the Spengler Cup in 2004 and 2006. In 2006–07, Hiller set a career-high win record with 28–16–0 in 44 games. Following the conclusion of the season, he was signed as an undrafted free agent by the NHL's Anaheim Ducks in May 2007.

Hiller made his debut for the Ducks on 30 September 2007, defeating the Los Angeles Kings 4–1 in London, England. He allowed 1 goal on 23 shots for the win.

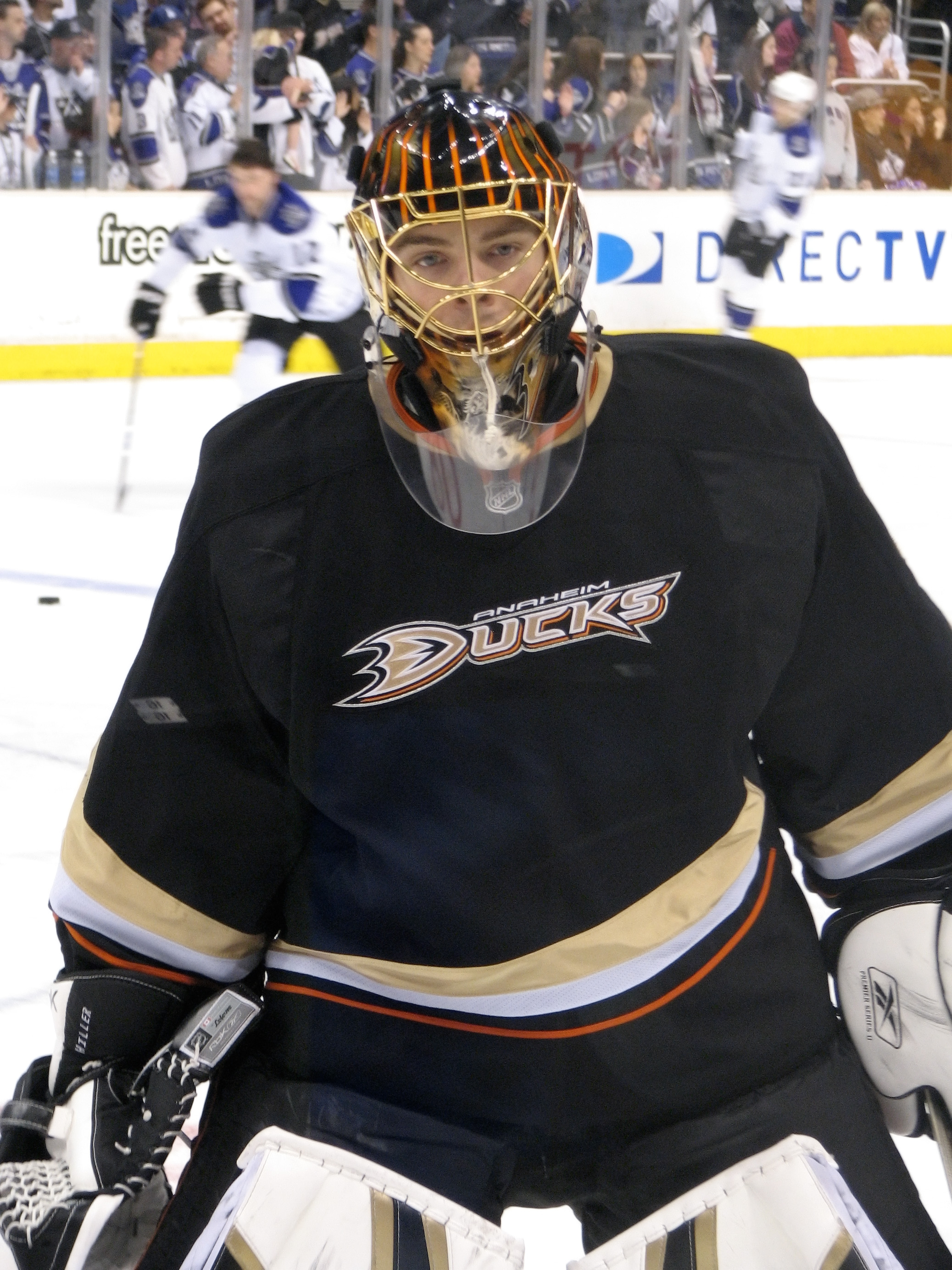
Hiller in 2008

Ducks general manager Brian Burke quickly felt Hiller was ready to become full-time backup to Jean-Sébastien Giguère, and as a result, placed backup Ilya Bryzgalov on waivers, where he was claimed by the Phoenix Coyotes. Hiller went on to record a 2.06 goals against average (GAA) and .926 save percentage in 23 games in his first NHL season, 2007–08.

Hiller recorded his first career NHL shutout in the 2008–09 season, defeating the Los Angeles Kings, 2–0. Following his strong regular season play, the Ducks named Hiller their starting goaltender for the 2009 Stanley Cup playoffs over incumbent starter Giguère. Hiller started his first career playoff game on 16 April 2009, recording a shutout over the San Jose Sharks in a 35-save performance. He and the Ducks ousted the Presidents' Trophy-winning Sharks in six games, marking only the fourth time in NHL history that the Presidents' Trophy-winning team had been eliminated in the playoffs' first round. The Ducks next matchup was the second-seeded Detroit Red Wings, a series which Detroit won in seven games. Nonetheless, many felt that it was only due to Hiller's goaltending that the Ducks were able to take the defending Stanley Cup champions to seven games.

Midway through the next season, on 30 January 2010, Hiller signed a four-year contract extension with the Ducks going through to the 2013–14 season. The next day, the Ducks traded Giguère to the Toronto Maple Leafs, cementing Hiller's status as the Ducks' starting goaltender. Hiller earned a spot in the 2011 NHL All-Star Game, held in Raleigh, North Carolina, on 30 January. On 2 February, after his first game returning from the All-Star weekend, Hiller felt lightheaded and was slow to react, allowing three goals on ten shots in the opening period of a 4–3 loss against the visiting San Jose Sharks. He sat out the next four games before shutting out the Edmonton Oilers 4–0 on 13 February, but the symptoms reappeared. Hiller then sat out another 15 games, making what would be his last appearance of the season during a 5–4 loss to the Nashville Predators on 24 March. In August 2011, Hiller said he was symptom-free.

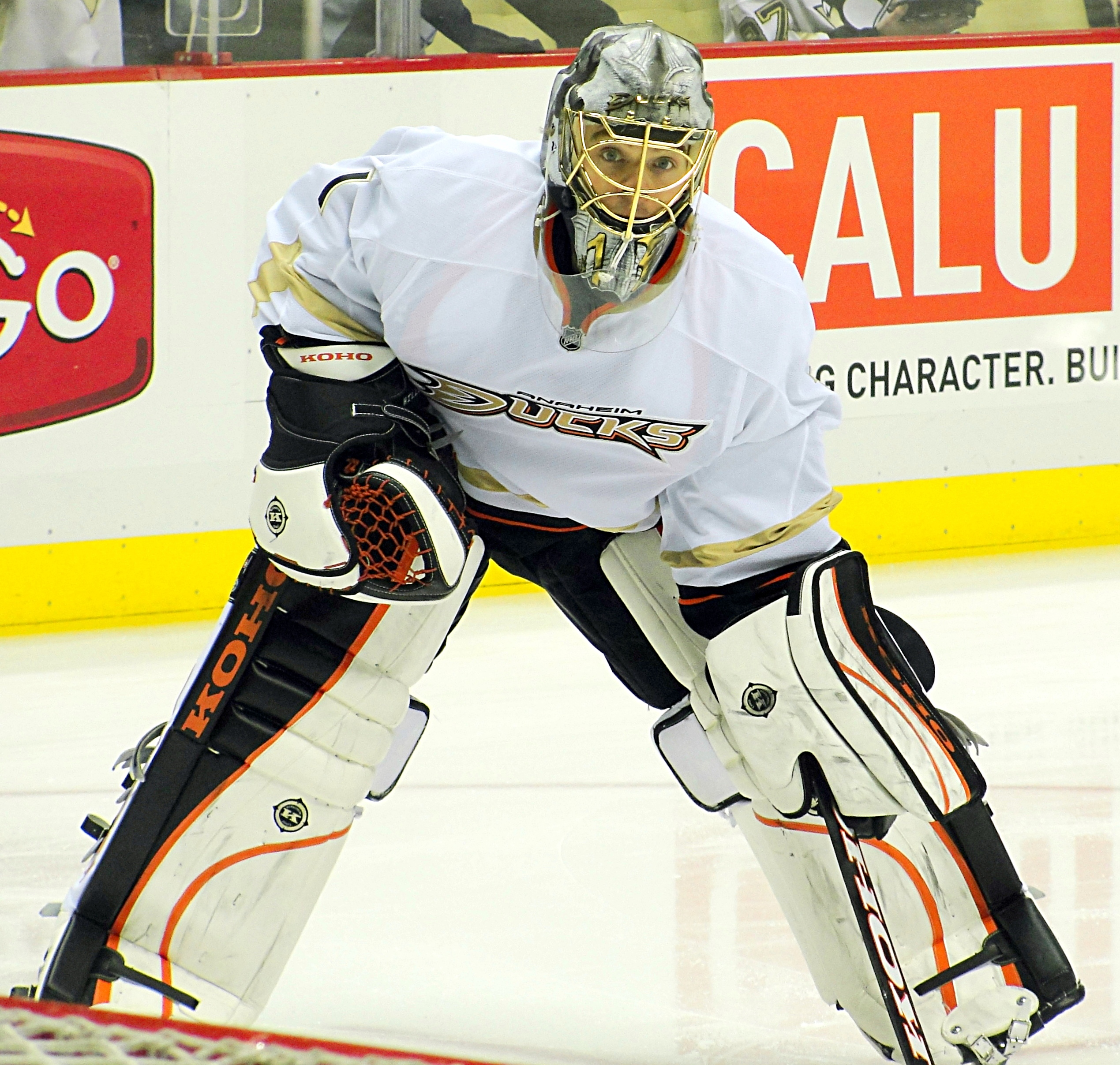
Hiller with the Ducks in 2012

During the lockout-shortened 2012–13 season, Hiller helped the Ducks place second overall in the Western Conference. During the 2013 playoffs, however, the Ducks were eliminated in a seven-game series against the Detroit Red Wings for the second time in five years.

On 1 July 2014, after his contract had expired with Anaheim, Hiller signed a two-year contract as an unrestricted free agent with the Calgary Flames at an annual average of $4.5 million. In his first season in Calgary, 2014–15, he emerged as the Flames' starting goaltender, partaking in most of the Flames' regular season games and 7 of the Flames' 11 2015 playoff games. In Game 6 in the first round of the playoffs, he was pulled in favour of backup Karri Rämö after conceding two goals on three shots. Hiller started Game 1 of the second round against his former team, the Ducks, but was again pulled in favour of Rämö. Rämö remained in goal for the rest of the series, which the Flames lost in five games.

Hiller struggled throughout the 2015–16 season, recording a 9–11–1 record with a 3.51 GAA. Calgary opted not to re-sign Hiller or Rämö, instead acquiring Brian Elliott from the St. Louis Blues after the season to replace them.

On 19 April 2016, Hiller agreed to a three-year contract with EHC Biel of the Swiss National League A (NLA) worth CHF 2.1 million. On 27 August 2018 Hiller was signed to an early one-year contract extension by EHC Biel, through the 2019-20 season. Before the 2019-20 season, Hiller announced his intention to retire from professional hockey at the conclusion of the season, after a 4-year stint with EHC Biel.

On 16 March 2020 Hiller officially announced his retirement from professional hockey.

== International play ==
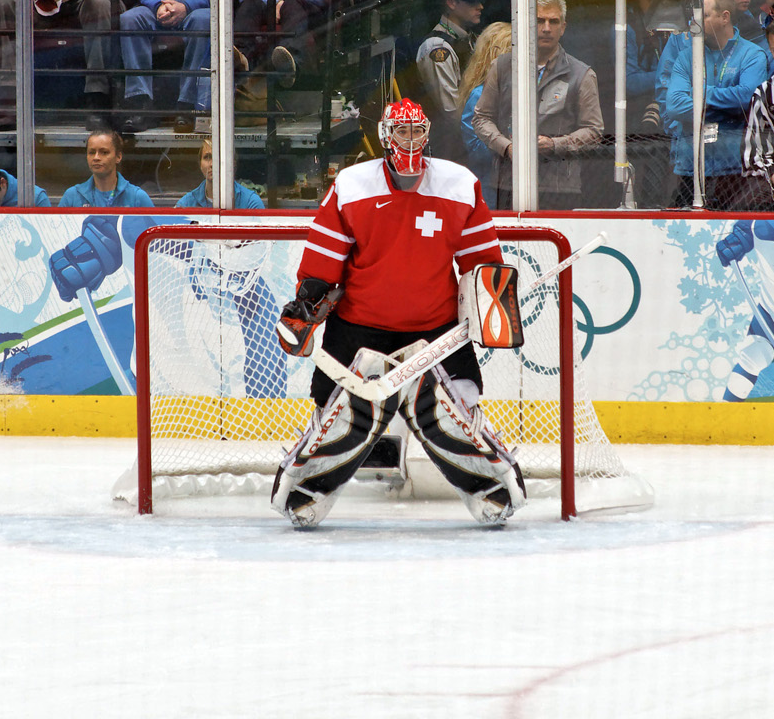
Hiller with Switzerland during the 2010 Winter Olympics

Hiller played in goal for Switzerland at the 2010 Winter Olympics in Vancouver, British Columbia. Switzerland finished in eighth place, losing to the United States in the quarterfinal round. He also played goalie for Switzerland in the 2014 Winter Olympics in Sochi, where Switzerland finished in ninth place, losing to Latvia in the qualification playoffs.

== Personal life ==
Hiller is fluent in English, German and French. He is a butterfly-style goaltender.

== Career statistics ==
=== Regular season and playoffs ===
			Regular season										Playoffs
Season	Team	League	GP	W	L	T	OTL	MIN	GA	SO	GAA	SV%	GP	W	L	MIN	GA	SO	GAA	SV%
1998–99	SC Herisau	SUI U17	—	—	—	—	—	—	—	—	—	—	—	—	—	—	—	—	—	—
1998–99	SC Herisau	SUI U20	—	—	—	—	—	—	—	—	—	—	—	—	—	—	—	—	—	—
1999–00	SC Herisau	SUI U20	—	—	—	—	—	—	—	—	—	—	—	—	—	—	—	—	—	—
1999–00	SC Herisau	SUI.3	2	—	—	—	—	—	—	—	0.65	—	—	—	—	—	—	—	—	—
2000–01	HC Davos	SUI U20	—	—	—	—	—	—	—	—	—	—	—	—	—	—	—	—	—	—
2000–01	HC Davos	NLA	1	—	—	—	—	—	—	—	0.00	1.000	—	—	—	—	—	—	—	—
2001–02	HC Davos	SUI U20	—	—	—	—	—	—	—	—	—	—	—	—	—	—	—	—	—	—
2001–02	EHC Lenzerheide-Valbella	SUI.3	3	—	—	—	—	—	—	—	4.51	—	—	—	—	—	—	—	—	—
2002–03	HC Davos	SUI U20	—	—	—	—	—	—	—	—	—	—	—	—	—	—	—	—	—	—
2002–03	HC Davos	NLA	2	—	—	—	—	—	—	—	2.63	—	—	—	—	—	—	—	—	—
2002–03	EHC Lenzerheide-Valbella	SUI.3	10	—	—	—	—	—	—	—	2.44	—	—	—	—	—	—	—	—	—
2003–04	HC Lausanne	NLA	13	3	7	1	—	709	42	1	3.55	—	—	—	—	—	—	—	—	—
2003–04	HC La Chaux-de-Fonds	SUI.2	1	0	1	0	—	60	4	0	4.00	—	—	—	—	—	—	—	—	—
2004–05	HC Davos	NLA	43	26	12	4	—	2523	94	8	2.24	—	15	12	3	932	34	0	2.19	—
2005–06	HC Davos	NLA	42	22	15	5	—	2551	98	4	2.30	—	15	9	6	900	45	1	3.00	—
2006–07	HC Davos	NLA	44	28	16	—	0	2656	115	3	2.60	—	19	12	7	1138	39	3	2.05	—
2007–08	Anaheim Ducks	NHL	23	10	7	—	1	1223	42	0	2.06	.927	—	—	—	—	—	—	—	—
2007–08	Portland Pirates	AHL	6	3	2	—	1	370	13	0	2.11	.929	—	—	—	—	—	—	—	—
2008–09	Anaheim Ducks	NHL	46	23	15	—	1	2486	99	4	2.39	.919	13	7	6	807	30	2	2.23	.943
2009–10	Anaheim Ducks	NHL	59	30	23	—	4	3338	152	2	2.73	.918	—	—	—	—	—	—	—	—
2010–11	Anaheim Ducks	NHL	49	26	16	—	3	2672	114	5	2.56	.924	—	—	—	—	—	—	—	—
2011–12	Anaheim Ducks	NHL	73	29	30	—	12	4253	182	4	2.57	.910	—	—	—	—	—	—	—	—
2012–13	Anaheim Ducks	NHL	26	15	6	—	4	1498	59	1	2.36	.913	7	3	4	439	18	1	2.46	.917
2013–14	Anaheim Ducks	NHL	50	29	13	—	7	2909	120	5	2.48	.911	6	2	2	219	8	0	2.19	.906
2014–15	Calgary Flames	NHL	52	26	19	—	4	2871	113	1	2.36	.918	7	3	3	322	14	0	2.61	.919
2015–16	Calgary Flames	NHL	26	9	11	—	1	1351	79	1	3.51	.879	—	—	—	—	—	—	—	—
2016–17	EHC Biel	NLA	47	22	22	—	3	2803	127	2	2.72	.916	5	1	4	307	14	0	2.74	.924
2017–18	EHC Biel	NL	47	24	15	—	3	2805	109	2	2.33	.926	11	6	5	617	31	0	3.01	.887
2018–19	EHC Biel	NL	44	22	20	—	0	2627	112	4	2.56	.912	12	7	4	712	26	1	2.19	.931
2019–20	EHC Biel	NL	39	18	11	—	6	2367	98	1	2.48	.918	—	—	—	—	—	—	—	—
NL totals			319	165	118	10	12	19,041	795	25	2.51	—	77	47	29	4606	189	5	2.46	—
NHL totals			378	188	129	—	36	21,249	881	22	2.49	.917	33	15	15	1787	70	3	2.35	.930

- NLA/NL totals do not include numbers from the 2000–01 and 2002–03 seasons.

=== International ===
Year	Team	Event	GP	W	L	MIN	GA	SO	GAA	SV%
2005	Switzerland	OGQ	DNP	—	—	—	—	—	—	—
2006	Switzerland	WC	DNP	—	—	—	—	—	—	—
2007	Switzerland	WC	6	3	3	359	15	0	2.51	.910
2008	Switzerland	WC	3	1	2	151	7	0	2.79	.915
2010	Switzerland	OG	5	2	3	316	13	0	2.47	.918
2014	Switzerland	OG	3	2	1	179	2	2	0.67	.971
2017	Switzerland	WC	2	0	0	71	6	0	5.04	.818
2018	Switzerland	OG	4	1	2	211	4	1	1.14	.956
Senior totals			23	9	11	1287	47	3	2.19	.920

== Awards and honours ==
Award	Year
NLA
Jacques Plante Trophy	2005, 2007
Champion (HC Davos)	2005, 2007
MVP	2007
NHL
All-Star Game	2011

== Records ==
- Shares record for most consecutive wins in one NHL regular season – 14 (6 December 2013 to 12 January 2014)
