= 2014–15 Calgary Flames season =

NHL team season

2014–15 Calgary Flames
- Division: 3rd Pacific
- Conference: 8th Western
- 2014–15 record: 45–30–7
- Home record: 23–13–5
- Road record: 22–17–2
- Goals for: 241
- Goals against: 216

Team information
- General manager: Brad Treliving
- Coach: Bob Hartley
- Captain: Mark Giordano
- Alternate captains: Curtis Glencross (Oct.–Mar.); Jiri Hudler (Mar.–May); Kris Russell; Dennis Wideman (Mar.–May)
- Arena: Scotiabank Saddledome
- Average attendance: 19,097 (99%)
- Minor league affiliates: Adirondack Flames (AHL); Alaska Aces (ECHL)

Team leaders
- Goals: Sean Monahan and Jiri Hudler (31)
- Assists: Jiri Hudler (45)
- Points: Jiri Hudler (76)
- Penalty minutes: Brandon Bollig (88)
- Plus/minus: Kris Russell (+18)
- Wins: Jonas Hiller (26)
- Goals against average: Jonas Hiller (2.36)

The 2014–15 Calgary Flames season was the 35th season in Calgary and 43rd for the Flames franchise in the National Hockey League (NHL). Entering the second year of a rebuilding phase, the Flames began the season with low expectations as nearly every pundit predicted the team would finish near the bottom of the League standings. Instead, however, the Flames proved to be one of the surprise stories of the 2014–15 NHL season by finishing third in the Pacific Division with a record of 45–30–7 and qualified for the 2015 Stanley Cup playoffs; it was the team's first playoff appearance since 2009.

Jiří Hudler and Sean Monahan tied for the team lead with 31 goals, while Hudler led the team with 45 assists and 76 points. Johnny Gaudreau tied the Ottawa Senators' Mark Stone for the rookie scoring lead with 64 points, while free agent acquisition Jonas Hiller was the Flames' leading goaltender with 26 wins and a goals against average (GAA) of 2.36. Gaudreau and team captain Mark Giordano both played in the 2015 NHL All-Star Game, and Calgary's top selection at the 2014 NHL entry draft, Sam Bennett, made his NHL debut in the team's last game of the year, recording his first point with an assist in his first shift, 33 seconds into the contest.

== Off-season ==
The 2014–15 season is the first for Brad Treliving as Flames' general manager. He succeeded Brian Burke, who acted as interim general manager following the dismissal of Jay Feaster the previous season. Treliving was active during the free agency period, and signed three players on July 1, 2014: Cochrane, Alberta, native Mason Raymond; goaltender Jonas Hiller; and defenceman Deryk Engelland. The Flames lost leading goal-scorer Michael Cammalleri, who signed a five-year contract with the New Jersey Devils.

The Flames played nine exhibition games during training camp. One contest, held September 24 against the Arizona Coyotes, was played in Sylvan Lake after the central Alberta town won the Canadian Broadcasting Corporation's annual Kraft Hockeyville competition. The Flames won the contest score of 4–3; Curtis Glencross scored the winning goal in overtime.

== Regular season ==
=== October–November ===
The Flames entered the second season of their rebuild with low expectations. The Calgary Sun's sports writers predicted finishes between 27th and 29th overall in the 30-team NHL, while the Calgary Herald's writers predicted finishes between 12th and 14th place in the 14-team Western Conference. Nationally, The Hockey News predicted the team would finish seventh, and last, in the Pacific Division. In spite of the predictions, the Flames' rebuilding efforts were viewed positively by all three publications, particularly after Head Coach Bob Hartley built the team into one with a reputation of being a hard working club that consistently forced their opposition to earn wins. Fans and media expressed excitement over the arrival of 2014 top draft pick Sam Bennett along with the arrival of Hobey Baker Award winner Johnny Gaudreau from the NCAA. The excitement was tempered somewhat on the eve of the season's start when it was revealed that Bennett had suffered a shoulder injury during the pre-season that potentially required surgery, which would sideline him for several months.

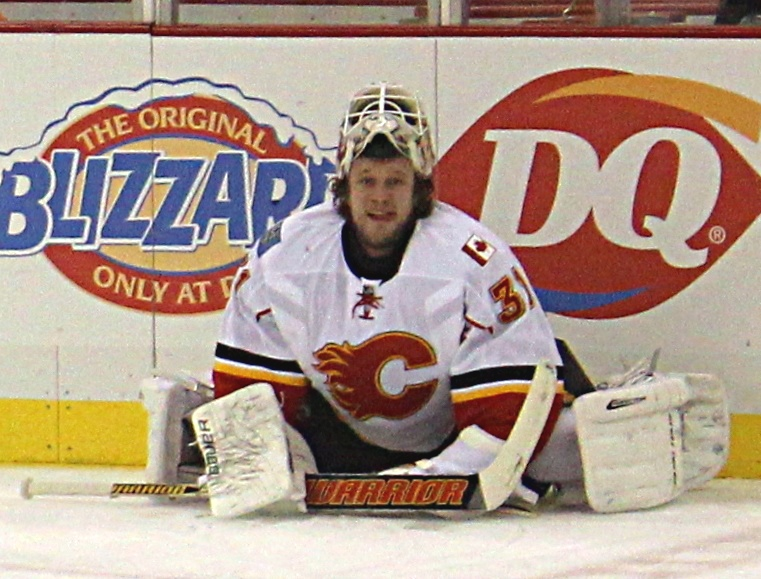
Consecutive shutouts by Karri Ramo at the end of November had the Flames within one point of the Pacific Division lead

The Flames' season opened on October 8, a 4–2 defeat on home ice against the Vancouver Canucks. The team began a six-game road trip the following night as newly acquired forward Mason Raymond spoiled the Edmonton Oilers' season opener by recording a hat-trick – including his 100th career goal – in a 5–2 victory. The team won four games on the trip, including a 2–1 overtime victory over the Chicago Blackhawks where goaltender Jonas Hiller made 49 saves on 50 shots. The Flames concluded October with a five-game homestand and a series of injuries to top players: Mason Raymond (upper body), Matt Stajan (knee) and Mikael Backlund (abdominal strain) were all placed on injured reserve in the final week of the month, prompting the team to recall Markus Granlund and Micheal Ferland from the American Hockey League (AHL)'s Adirondack Flames. Ferland was himself injured during his NHL debut after being checked in the head by Anton Volchenkov of the Nashville Predators. Volchenkov received a four-game suspension for the incident.

Calgary began November by winning three games out of a five-game, eastern road trip before returning home to defeat the Arizona Coyotes, 5–3, on November 13. The victory was the 1,500th in Flames' franchise history. Wins over the Ottawa Senators and the Pacific Division-leading Anaheim Ducks followed, and the Flames ended the first quarter of their season with a 12–6–2 record, just one point behind Anaheim for the Division lead. The unexpected strong start earned the Flames considerable praise, particularly when Calgary's rebuild was compared to that of the Edmonton Oilers, who again languished at the bottom of the Western Conference. The play of team captain Mark Giordano earned praise across the League; Hockey Night in Canada's Don Cherry argued that Giordano, who scored 18 points in his first 16 games, should be considered a favourite for the James Norris Memorial Trophy as the NHL's top defenceman. The Flames were also one of the best third period teams in the NHL at the one-quarter mark, having scored a League-leading 27 goals in the final frame, while giving up just 12. That resulted in the team also leading the NHL in wins when trailing after two periods, with four, and reinforced the team's reputation as being one of the hardest working squads in the League. However, the Flames also were consistently outshot in the first quarter and the team's shooting percentage and save percentage were viewed by some, such as The Globe and Mail's James Mirtle, as being unsustainable, even as he argued there were many positives for the team. The Flames continued winning as November came to an end, as goaltender Karri Ramo recorded consecutive shutout wins to end the month; 2–0 over the San Jose Sharks on November 27 and 3–0 over the Arizona Coyotes two nights later. With the victories, the Flames entered December with a 15–8–2 record and trailed Division co-leaders Anaheim and Vancouver by one point.

=== December–January ===
Bob Hartley won his 400th NHL game as a coach with a 4–3 overtime victory over one of his former teams, the Colorado Avalanche, on December 4. The Flames overcame a third period deficit for the sixth time on the season to earn the victory, and were led by Dennis Wideman's two goals as he moved into the NHL's lead amongst defencemen, with ten. A couple weeks after reaching the milestone, on December 17, the Flames announced that Hartley had agreed to a multi-year contract extension with the team.

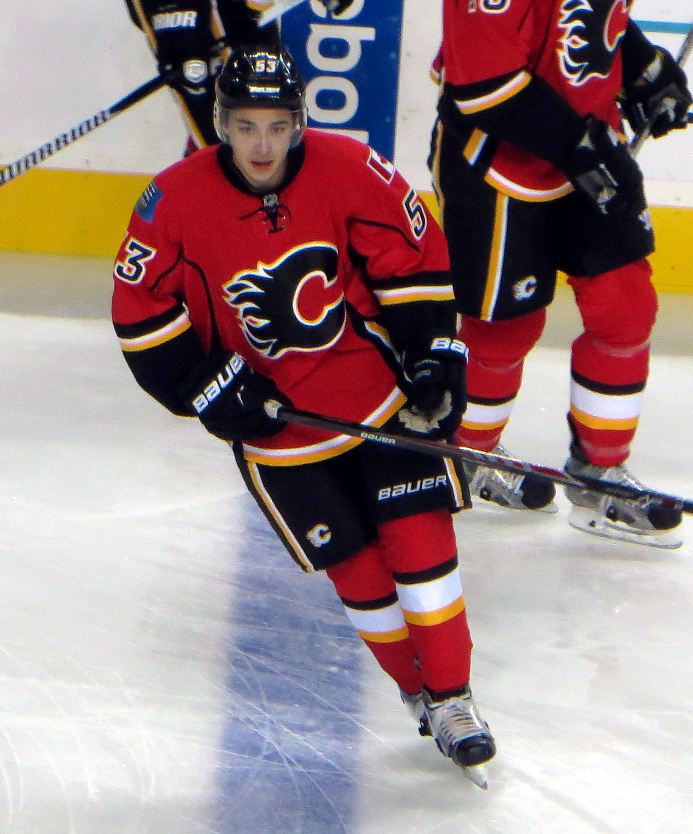
Johnny Gaudreau was named Rookie of the Month for December

The month of December quickly turned to disaster for the Flames, as they endured an extended losing streak; Calgary lost seven consecutive games in regulation, the longest such streak for the franchise since 1974, when the team was still located in Atlanta. The Flames, who were the highest-scoring team in the Western Conference when the streak began, scored only 11 goals during the seven regulation losses. The team finally earned a point, though they lost their eighth consecutive game, following a 3–2 overtime loss to Vancouver on December 20. The streak finally ended on December 22, the Flames' final game before the Christmas break. Calgary spotted the Los Angeles Kings a 3–0 lead before Gaudreau recorded a natural hat-trick, the first of his NHL career, as his three consecutive goals tied the game before Giordano won in overtime, 4–3.

Gaudreau scored another two goals, 16 seconds apart, to lead the Flames to a 4–1 victory over Edmonton in Calgary's first game following the Christmas break. Gaudreau's five goals in two games were enough for the NHL to name him the League's First Star of the Week of December 22–28. The Flames ended 2014 on a four-game winning streak and holding the final wild card playoff spot in the West after posting another pair home victories against Los Angeles and Edmonton. The New Year's Eve win over Edmonton, 4–3 in overtime, was the eighth game Calgary had won despite trailing at the start of the third period.

The Flames entered the break for the 60th National Hockey League All-Star Game by winning four games on a five-game road trip. Their lone loss was the final game of the trip, a 6–3 defeat at the hands of the Anaheim Ducks. It was the 20th consecutive loss at Anaheim's Honda Center for the Flames, a streak that dated back to the 2003–04 season. The Flames reached the break with a 25–19–3 record, fourth in the Pacific Division and held the final playoff spot in the Western Conference. Two Flames players were selected to participate in the All-Star Game festivities: Mark Giordano was selected to play the game, while Johnny Gaudreau was one of six rookies named to participate in the skills competition. Gaudreau was promoted to the main line-up on the eve of the contest as an injury replacement.

=== February–April ===
A six-game home stand followed the All-Star break; Calgary won four contests before splitting a two-game California road trip. Throughout the stretch of games, the Flames were one of three teams, along with Vancouver and San Jose, battling for second, third and fourth places in the Pacific Division; they defeated the Sharks twice during the stretch, and then returned home to defeat Vancouver on February 14 to begin a four-game homestand. Two nights later, the Flames overcame a three-goal deficit to defeat the Boston Bruins 4–3. The result was their tenth win when trailing at the start of the third period – they trailed 3–1 at the second intermission. It extended the team's franchise record (previously seven such victories, set in 1986–87) and moved the team within two of the Dallas Stars' NHL record of 12, set in 2005–06.

The Saddledome hosted the 2015 Brier, Canada's national men's curling championship, in the first week of March, which forced the Flames into a seven-game road trip. The Flames dropped the first contest, 1–0, to the New York Rangers on February 25 before rebounding to defeat the New Jersey Devils, 3–1, the following night. The game had devastating consequences for the team, however, as Giordano suffered a completely torn biceps tendon, ending his season. The loss of Giordano came days before veteran forward Curtis Glencross was traded to the Washington Capitals. Despite this, the Flames were successful on the road trip as they won four games. In one contest, a 4–3 shootout victory on March 5 over Boston, defenceman Kris Russell set an NHL record with 15 blocked shots. He went on to break the NHL record of 273 blocks in one season early in April.

The trip ended on March 8 in Ottawa, where Calgary overcame a 4–0 deficit in the third period to tie before ultimately losing in a shootout. It was only the fourth time in franchise history that the Flames came back from at least four goals down in the third to earn at least one standings point; the most recent was October 17, 1989, when Calgary scored five third period goals to earn an 8–8 tie against the Quebec Nordiques. Offensively, the Flames were led by Jiri Hudler, who was named the NHL's First Star for the Week of March 2–8 after recording eight points in the team's final four games of the road trip.

As March gave way to April, the Flames continued to battle the Kings, as well as the Winnipeg Jets, for control of the final two Western Conference playoff spots; Calgary's offence was paced in March by Hudler, who led the NHL with 23 points for the month. He was named the NHL's Second star of the Month, while Gaudreau was named Rookie of the Month for the second time after leading all first-year players with 16 points in March.

An April 1 victory over the Oilers in Edmonton not only completed a five-game season sweep of Calgary's provincial rivals, but marked the team's 22nd victory on the road and tied a franchise record set in 1988–89. Two nights later, the Flames also completed a season sweep of Arizona with a 3–2 win in Calgary; Sean Monahan's 31st goal of the season stood as the game-winning goal. It was his eighth such winner during the campaign, and made the 20-year-old only the fifth player in NHL history to score eight game winners in one season before the age of 21 (Wayne Gretzky, Pierre Turgeon, Eric Lindros and Sergei Samsonov being the others). On the same night, the Oilers dealt a critical blow to the Los Angeles' playoff chances with a 4–2 victory in Edmonton. The pair of results gave Calgary a two-point edge on the Kings and a chance to clinch a playoff spot as the teams met on April 9 in the penultimate game for each team. Led once again by Hudler and Gaudreau, who combined to score all three of the Flames' goals, Calgary defeated Los Angeles 3–1. The victory not only clinched the Flames' first post-season berth in six years, but also eliminated the defending Stanley Cup champion Kings from playoff contention. The regular season ended with a 5–1 defeat against the Winnipeg Jets. Three players made their NHL debuts in the contest: John Ramage, Brett Kulak and top draft pick Sam Bennett, who recorded his first NHL point just 33 seconds into the game by assisting on a goal from Micheal Ferland. The Flames finished the season in third place in the Pacific Division with a record of 45–30–7.

== Playoffs ==
Calgary's ascension to the 2015 Stanley Cup playoffs was one of the NHL's most unlikely stories for the season; only one member of the sports media, TSN's Aaron Ward, predicted the Flames would make the post-season and he did so on the argument that "there is always one team that surprises, and Calgary is it." By virtue of finishing third in the Pacific Division, the Flames drew a first-round playoff match-up against the second place Vancouver Canucks. It was the first post-season meeting between the two teams since the opening round of the 2004 playoffs, which Calgary won in seven games

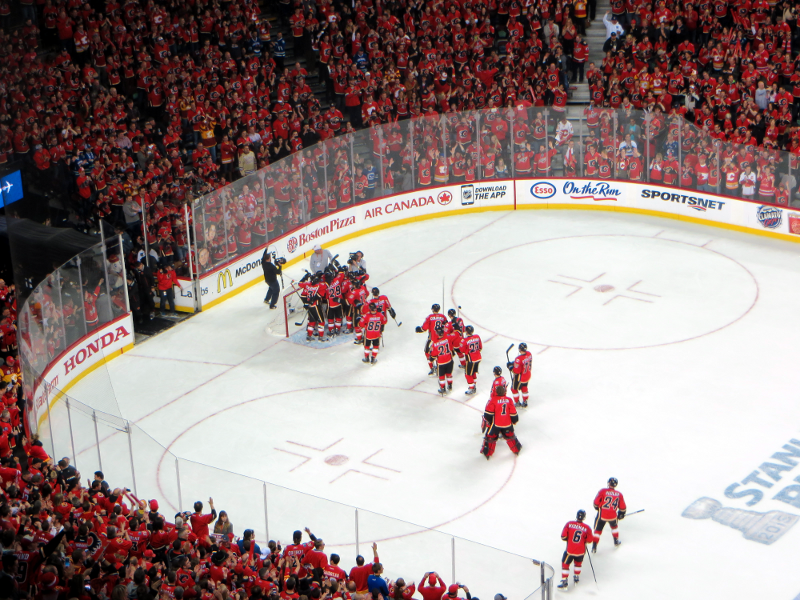
The Flames celebrate after eliminating Vancouver.

Continuing their third period success from the regular season, the Flames began the series with a third period rally in Vancouver; they scored twice to overcame a 1–0 deficit entering the third period; first, David Jones scored to tie the game eight minutes into the third, and then, Kris Russell's game-winning goal came with less than 30 seconds remaining in regulation time. The Canucks evened the series with a decisive 4–1 victory in Game 2, the end of which was marred by a line brawl in which Deryk Engelland was assessed three game misconduct penalties, and Vancouver's Dan Hamhuis was ejected for being third man into a fight. Returning to the Saddledome for the first playoff game in Calgary since April 27, 2009, the Flames took a 2–1 series lead with a 4–2 victory in Game 3. Sam Bennett scored his first NHL goal, a tally which stood as the game winner. The end of the game was again marred by violence, as Bennett was struck in the head by Hamhuis, while Vancouver's Alex Burrows was ejected for hitting Johnny Gaudreau from behind before instigating a fight with Russell. Burrows was involved in a frightening incident during practice the next day: He was taken to hospital, and ruled out of the rest of the series, after experiencing pain later revealed to be the result of a broken rib.

The series settled down somewhat in the following two games as Calgary won Game 4 by a 3–1 score before the Canucks, facing elimination, responded with a 2–1 victory on their home ice in Game 5. As the series progressed, Flames' rookie Micheal Ferland became one of the most popular players on the team as a result of his physical play, and his battles with Canucks defenceman Kevin Bieksa in particular. Bieksa attempted to trivialize Ferland's impact by calling him "irrelevant." Ferland had a significant impact on the sixth game of the series, in Calgary, however. After the Canucks stormed out to a 3–0 lead less than ten minutes into the game, Ferland started a Flames comeback by converting a pass from Matt Stajan late in the period. Calgary's top line of Monahan, Gaudreau and Hudler then combined for four goals and ten points as the Flames stormed back to tie the game twice before Matt Stajan scored the eventual series-winning goal in a 7–4 Flames victory. Ferland ended the scoring with an empty net goal with three seconds to play. The series victory was the first for the Flames since 2004 and set up a second round match-up with the Anaheim Ducks.

The Flames continued their streak of futility in the Honda Center as they dropped the first two games by 6–1 and 3–0 scores; Karri Ramo took over goaltending duties from Jonas Hiller after the first game and made his first NHL playoff start in the second contest. The Flames' play improved as the series shifted to Calgary, but the Flames continued to face adversity, trailing 3–2 late in the third period. Sam Bennett appeared to have scored the tying goal on a puck that appeared to barely cross the goal line. The play was sent to video review, but was ruled inconclusive and no-goal in a result eerily similar to an infamous no-goal call from the sixth game of the 2004 Stanley Cup Finals, also in Calgary. However, the Flames overcame the call as Gaudreau tied the game with 19.5 seconds remaining in the third period before Mikael Backlund won it at 4:36 of overtime. It was the only victory of the series for the Flames, as they lost game four by a 4–2 score, and were eliminated in Game 5 after dropping a 3–2 decision in overtime.

== Standings ==
Pacific Division
Pos	Team	GP	W	L	OTL	ROW	GF	GA	GD	Pts
1	z – Anaheim Ducks	82	51	24	7	43	236	226	+10	109
2	x – Vancouver Canucks	82	48	29	5	42	242	222	+20	101
3	x – Calgary Flames	82	45	30	7	41	241	216	+25	97
4	Los Angeles Kings	82	40	27	15	38	220	205	+15	95
5	San Jose Sharks	82	40	33	9	36	228	232	−4	89
6	Edmonton Oilers	82	24	44	14	19	198	283	−85	62
7	Arizona Coyotes	82	24	50	8	19	170	272	−102	56

Source: National Hockey League
x – Clinched playoff spot; z – Clinched conference

== Schedule and results ==
=== Pre-season ===
Pre-season game log: 5–4–0 (Home: 4–1–0; Road: 1–3–0)
#	Date	Visitor	Score	Home	OT	Decision	Attendance	Record	Recap
1	September 21	Calgary	1–3	Edmonton		Ortio	16,839	0–1–0	Recap
2	September 21	Edmonton	0–1	Calgary		Hiller	19,289	1–1–0	Recap
3^{[a]}	September 24	Arizona	3–4	Calgary	OT	Carr		2–1–0	Recap
4	September 25	Vancouver	3–1	Calgary		Hiller	19,289	2–2–0	Recap
5	September 26	Calgary	0–3	Vancouver		Carr	18,482	2–3–0	Recap
6	September 28	Calgary	2–1	Colorado		Ramo		3–3–0	Recap
7	September 30	Colorado	0–2	Calgary		Hiller	19,289	4–3–0	Recap
8	October 2	Winnipeg	2–4	Calgary		Ramo	19,289	5–3–0	Recap
9	October 4	Calgary	1–4	Winnipeg		Hiller	14,790	5–4–0	Recap
Notes:^{a} Game was played in Sylvan Lake, Alberta (Kraft Hockeyville game).

=== Regular season ===
Game log

October: 6–4–2 (Home: 2–2–2; Road: 4–2–0)
#	Date	Visitor	Score	Home	OT	Decision	Attendance	Record	Pts	Recap
1	October 8	Vancouver	4–2	Calgary		Hiller	19,289	0–1–0	0	Recap
2	October 9	Calgary	5–2	Edmonton		Ramo	16,839	1–1–0	2	Recap
3	October 11	Calgary	1–4	St. Louis		Hiller	17,120	1–2–0	2	Recap
4	October 14	Calgary	3–2	Nashville	SO	Ramo	15,654	2–2–0	4	Recap
5	October 15	Calgary	2–1	Chicago	OT	Hiller	21,112	3–2–0	6	Recap
6	October 17	Calgary	2–3	Columbus		Ramo	15,987	3–3–0	6	Recap
7	October 19	Calgary	4–1	Winnipeg		Hiller	15,016	4–3–0	8	Recap
8	October 21	Tampa Bay	2–1	Calgary	OT	Ramo	19,289	4–3–1	9	Recap
9	October 23	Carolina	0–5	Calgary		Hiller	19,289	5–3–1	11	Recap
10	October 25	Washington	3–1	Calgary		Ramo	19,095	5–4–1	11	Recap
11	October 28	Montreal	2–1	Calgary	SO	Hiller	19,289	5–4–2	12	Recap
12	October 31	Nashville	3–4	Calgary		Hiller	18,505	6–4–2	14	Recap

November: 9–4–0 (Home: 4–1–0; Road: 5–3–0)
#	Date	Visitor	Score	Home	OT	Decision	Attendance	Record	Pts	Recap
13	November 2	Calgary	6–2	Montreal		Hiller	21,287	7–4–2	16	Recap
14	November 4	Calgary	4–3	Washington	OT	Hiller	18,506	8–4–2	18	Recap
15	November 6	Calgary	2–5	Tampa Bay		Hiller	18,276	8–5–2	18	Recap
16	November 8	Calgary	6–4	Florida		Hiller	9,230	9–5–2	20	Recap
17	November 10	Calgary	1–4	Carolina		Hiller	9,906	9–6–2	20	Recap
18	November 13	Arizona	3–5	Calgary		Hiller	18,698	10–6–2	22	Recap
19	November 15	Ottawa	2–4	Calgary		Ramo	19,289	11–6–2	24	Recap
20	November 18	Anaheim	3–4	Calgary	SO	Hiller	18,421	12–6–2	26	Recap
21	November 20	Chicago	4–3	Calgary		Hiller	19,289	12–7–2	26	Recap
22	November 22	New Jersey	4–5	Calgary	SO	Ramo	18,874	13–7–2	28	Recap
23	November 25	Calgary	2–3	Anaheim		Hiller	17,174	13–8–2	28	Recap
24	November 26	Calgary	2–0	San Jose		Ramo	17,353	14–8–2	30	Recap
25	November 29	Calgary	3–0	Arizona		Ramo	13,530	15–8–2	32	Recap

December: 6–7–1 (Home: 5–3–0; Road: 1–4–1)
#	Date	Visitor	Score	Home	OT	Decision	Attendance	Record	Pts	Recap
26	December 2	Arizona	2–5	Calgary		Ramo	18,837	16–8–2	34	Recap
27	December 4	Colorado	3–4	Calgary	OT	Ramo	18,651	17–8–2	36	Recap
28	December 6	San Jose	3–2	Calgary		Ramo	18,818	17–9–2	36	Recap
29	December 9	Calgary	1–4	Toronto		Hiller	19,122	17–10–2	36	Recap
30	December 11	Calgary	3–4	Buffalo		Ramo	18,208	17–11–2	36	Recap
31	December 12	Calgary	1–3	Pittsburgh		Hiller	18,471	17–12–2	36	Recap
32	December 14	Calgary	1–2	Chicago		Hiller	21,572	17–13–2	36	Recap
33	December 16	NY Rangers	5–2	Calgary		Ramo	18,352	17–14–2	36	Recap
34	December 19	Dallas	2–1	Calgary		Hiller	19,289	17–15–2	36	Recap
35	December 20	Calgary	2–3	Vancouver	OT	Hiller	18,747	17–15–3	37	Recap
36	December 22	Calgary	4–3	Los Angeles	OT	Hiller	18,230	18–15–3	39	Recap
37	December 27	Edmonton	1–4	Calgary		Hiller	19,289	19–15–3	41	Recap
38	December 29	Los Angeles	1–2	Calgary		Hiller	19,289	20–15–3	43	Recap
39	December 31	Edmonton	3–4	Calgary	OT	Hiller	19,289	21–15–3	45	Recap

January: 6–5–0 (Home: 2–4–0; Road: 4–1–0)
#	Date	Visitor	Score	Home	OT	Decision	Attendance	Record	Pts	Recap
40	January 2	NY Islanders	2–1	Calgary		Hiller	19,289	21–16–3	45	Recap
41	January 7	Detroit	3–2	Calgary		Hiller	19,154	21–17–3	45	Recap
42	January 9	Florida	6–5	Calgary		Hiller	19,289	21–18–3	45	Recap
43	January 10	Calgary	1–0	Vancouver		Ortio	18,870	22–18–3	47	Recap
44	January 15	Calgary	4–1	Arizona		Ortio	12,982	23–18–3	49	Recap
45	January 17	Calgary	4–3	San Jose	OT	Ortio	17,562	24–18–3	51	Recap
46	January 19	Calgary	2–1	Los Angeles	OT	Ortio	18,230	25–18–3	53	Recap
47	January 21	Calgary	3–6	Anaheim		Ortio	16,828	25–19–3	53	Recap
48	January 27	Buffalo	1–4	Calgary		Hiller	18,563	26–19–3	55	Recap
49	January 29	Minnesota	1–0	Calgary		Hiller	19,289	26–20–3	55	Recap
50	January 31	Edmonton	2–4	Calgary		Hiller	19,289	27–20–3	57	Recap

February: 6–5–1 (Home: 4–2–1; Road: 2–3–0)
#	Date	Visitor	Score	Home	OT	Decision	Attendance	Record	Pts	Recap
51	February 2	Winnipeg	2–5	Calgary		Hiller	18,824	28–20–3	59	Recap
52	February 4	San Jose	1–3	Calgary		Hiller	18,781	29–20–3	61	Recap
53	February 6	Pittsburgh	4–0	Calgary		Hiller	19,289	29–21–3	61	Recap
54	February 9	Calgary	4–1	San Jose		Hiller	17,010	30–21–3	63	Recap
55	February 12	Calgary	3–5	Los Angeles		Hiller	18,230	30–22–3	63	Recap
56	February 14	Vancouver	2–3	Calgary		Ramo	19,289	31–22–3	65	Recap
57	February 16	Boston	3–4	Calgary	OT	Hiller	19,289	32–22–3	67	Recap
58	February 18	Minnesota	3–2	Calgary	OT	Hiller	19,277	32–22–4	68	Recap
59	February 20	Anaheim	6–3	Calgary		Hiller	19,289	32–23–4	68	Recap
60	February 24	Calgary	0–1	NY Rangers		Ramo	18,006	32–24–4	68	Recap
61	February 25	Calgary	3–1	New Jersey		Ramo	13,662	33–24–4	70	Recap
62	February 27	Calgary	1–2	NY Islanders		Ramo	16,170	33–25–4	70	Recap

March: 9–3–3 (Home: 4–1–2; Road: 5–2–1)
#	Date	Visitor	Score	Home	OT	Decision	Attendance	Record	Pts	Recap
63	March 3	Calgary	3–2	Philadelphia	OT	Ramo	19,513	34–25–4	72	Recap
64	March 5	Calgary	4–3	Boston	SO	Ramo	17,565	35–25–4	74	Recap
65	March 6	Calgary	5–2	Detroit		Hiller	20,027	36–25–4	76	Recap
66	March 8	Calgary	4–5	Ottawa	SO	Hiller	16,840	36–25–5	77	Recap
67	March 11	Anaheim	3–6	Calgary		Ramo	19,289	37–25–5	79	Recap
68	March 13	Toronto	3–6	Calgary		Hiller	19,289	38–25–5	81	Recap
69	March 14	Calgary	2–3	Colorado		Ramo	18,007	38–26–5	81	Recap
70	March 17	St. Louis	4–0	Calgary		Hiller	19,289	38–27–5	81	Recap
71	March 19	Philadelphia	1–4	Calgary		Ramo	19,289	39–27–5	83	Recap
72	March 21	Columbus	3–2	Calgary	OT	Ramo	19,289	39–27–6	84	Recap
73	March 23	Colorado	2–3	Calgary		Ramo	19,289	40–27–6	86	Recap
74	March 25	Dallas	4–3	Calgary	SO	Ramo	19,289	40–27–7	87	Recap
75	March 27	Calgary	2–4	Minnesota		Ramo	19,040	40–28–7	87	Recap
76	March 29	Calgary	5–2	Nashville		Hiller	17,113	41–28–7	89	Recap
77	March 30	Calgary	5–3	Dallas		Hiller	17,898	42–28–7	91	Recap

April: 3–2–0 (Home: 2–0–0; Road: 1–2–0)
#	Date	Visitor	Score	Home	OT	Decision	Attendance	Record	Pts	Recap
78	April 2	Calgary	1–4	St. Louis		Hiller	19,308	42–29–7	91	Recap
79	April 4	Calgary	4–0	Edmonton		Hiller	16,839	43–29–7	93	Recap
80	April 7	Arizona	2–3	Calgary		Hiller	19,289	44–29–7	95	Recap
81	April 9	Los Angeles	1–3	Calgary		Hiller	19,289	45–29–7	97	Recap
82	April 11	Calgary	1–5	Winnipeg		Ortio	15,016	45–30–7	97	Recap

Legend: Win (2 points) Loss (0 points) Overtime/shootout loss (1 point)

=== Playoffs ===
2015 Stanley Cup Playoffs

Western Conference First Round vs. (P2) Vancouver Canucks: Calgary won series 4–2
#	Date	Visitor	Score	Home	OT	Decision	Attendance	Series	Recap
1	April 15	Calgary	2–1	Vancouver		Hiller	18,870	Calgary leads 1–0	Recap
2	April 17	Calgary	1–4	Vancouver		Hiller	18,870	Series tied 1–1	Recap
3	April 19	Vancouver	2–4	Calgary		Hiller	19,289	Calgary leads 2–1	Recap
4	April 21	Vancouver	1–3	Calgary		Hiller	19,289	Calgary leads 3–1	Recap
5	April 23	Calgary	1–2	Vancouver		Hiller	18,870	Calgary leads 3–2	Recap
6	April 25	Vancouver	4–7	Calgary		Ramo	19,289	Calgary wins 4–2	Recap

Western Conference Second Round vs. (P1) Anaheim Ducks: Anaheim won series 4–1
#	Date	Visitor	Score	Home	OT	Decision	Attendance	Series	Recap
1	April 30	Calgary	1–6	Anaheim		Hiller	17,174	Anaheim leads 1–0	Recap
2	May 3	Calgary	0–3	Anaheim		Ramo	17,299	Anaheim leads 2–0	Recap
3	May 5	Anaheim	3–4	Calgary	OT	Ramo	19,289	Anaheim leads 2–1	Recap
4	May 8	Anaheim	4–2	Calgary		Ramo	19,289	Anaheim leads 3–1	Recap
5	May 10	Calgary	2–3	Anaheim	OT	Ramo	17,284	Anaheim wins 4–1	Recap

Legend: Win Loss

== Player statistics ==
Final stats

=== Skaters ===
Regular season
Player	GP	G	A	Pts	+/-	PIM
Jiri Hudler	78	31	45	76	17	14
Johnny Gaudreau	80	24	40	64	11	14
Sean Monahan	81	31	31	62	8	12
Dennis Wideman	80	15	41	56	6	34
Mark Giordano	61	11	37	48	13	37
T. J. Brodie	81	11	30	41	15	30
Lance Bouma	78	16	18	34	10	54
Kris Russell	79	4	30	34	18	17
David Jones	67	14	16	30	−3	18
Curtis Glencross^{‡}	53	9	19	28	3	39
Joe Colborne	64	8	20	28	7	43
Mikael Backlund	52	10	17	27	4	14
Josh Jooris	60	12	12	24	1	16
Mason Raymond	57	12	11	23	−8	8
Paul Byron	57	6	13	19	−2	8
Markus Granlund	48	8	10	18	−4	16
Matt Stajan	59	7	10	17	7	28
Deryk Engelland	76	2	9	11	−16	53
Micheal Ferland	26	2	3	5	1	16
Brandon Bollig	62	1	4	5	−9	88
Raphael Diaz	56	2	2	4	−3	10
Sven Baertschi^{‡}	15	0	4	4	−3	6
Drew Shore	11	1	2	3	−5	0
Sam Bennett	1	0	1	1	−1	0
Emile Poirier	6	0	1	1	1	0
Ladislav Smid	31	0	1	1	−12	13
John Ramage	1	0	0	0	−1	0
Tyler Wotherspoon	1	0	0	0	−3	0
Brett Kulak	1	0	0	0	0	2
Corban Knight^{‡}	2	0	0	0	0	0
David Wolf	3	0	0	0	0	2
Max Reinhart	4	0	0	0	−3	0
Corey Potter	6	0	0	0	−1	0
Brian McGrattan	8	0	0	0	−2	4
Devin Setoguchi	12	0	0	0	−7	4
David Schlemko^{†}	19	0	0	0	6	8

Playoffs
Player	GP	G	A	Pts	+/-	PIM
Johnny Gaudreau	11	4	5	9	−2	6
Jiri Hudler	11	4	4	8	−2	2
Kris Russell	11	2	5	7	−9	7
Dennis Wideman	11	0	7	7	−2	12
Sean Monahan	11	3	3	6	−3	2
Micheal Ferland	9	3	2	5	3	23
David Jones	11	2	3	5	1	2
T. J. Brodie	11	1	4	5	3	0
Sam Bennett	11	3	1	4	−3	8
Matt Stajan	11	1	3	4	0	21
Joe Colborne	11	1	2	3	−3	20
Brandon Bollig	11	2	0	2	−1	38
Mikael Backlund	11	1	1	2	−1	8
Mason Raymond	8	0	2	2	−4	0
Deryk Engelland	11	0	1	1	−1	50
David Schlemko	11	0	1	1	1	2
Markus Granlund	3	0	1	1	1	0
Corey Potter	2	0	0	0	−1	0
Lance Bouma	2	0	0	0	0	2
Drew Shore	1	0	0	0	−1	2
Raphael Diaz	3	0	0	0	1	0
Tyler Wotherspoon	6	0	0	0	0	0
Josh Jooris	9	0	0	0	0	4
David Wolf	1	0	0	0	0	0

=== Goaltenders ===
Regular season
Player	GP	TOI	W	L	OT	GA	GAA	SA	SV%	SO	G	A	PIM
Jonas Hiller	52	2871	26	19	4	113	2.36	1376	.918	2	0	0	0
Karri Ramo	34	1732	15	9	3	75	2.60	852	.912	2	0	0	0
Joni Ortio	6	333	4	2	0	14	2.51	153	.908	1	0	0	0

Playoffs
Player	GP	TOI	W	L	GA	GAA	SA	SV%	SO	G	A	PIM
Karri Ramo	7	336	2	3	16	2.86	171	.906	0	0	0	0
Jonas Hiller	7	322	3	3	14	2.61	173	.919	0	0	0	0

^{†}Denotes player spent time with another organization before joining Flames. Statistics reflect time with the Flames only.
^{‡}Traded mid-season. Statistics reflect time with the Flames only.

== Awards and honours ==
In recognition of their unexpected season, the Flames led the NHL with four nominees for major season-end awards. Bob Hartley became the first Flame to be named coach of the year as he won the Jack Adams Award. Jiri Hudler won the Lady Byng Memorial Trophy as the most gentlemanly player in the NHL. Johnny Gaudreau was a finalist for the Calder Memorial Trophy as rookie of the year, but finished third in voting behind Mark Stone of Ottawa, and the winner, Aaron Ekblad of Florida. Gaudreau received 33 first place votes. Gaudreau joined the other two players as a member of the NHL All-Rookie Team. Mark Giordano was nominated for the NHL Foundation Player Award for community service, but lost to Brent Burns. Giordano also finished sixth overall in voting, with one first place vote, for the James Norris Memorial Trophy as top defenceman despite missing the final quarter of the season due to injury.

=== Awards ===
Player	Award	Awarded	Ref.
Mark Giordano	NHL First Star of the Week	November 10, 2014	
Karri Ramo	NHL Third Star of the Week	December 1, 2014	
Mark Giordano	NHL First Star of the Month	December 1, 2014	
Johnny Gaudreau	NHL First Star of the Week	December 29, 2014	
Johnny Gaudreau	NHL Rookie of the Month – December 2014	January 2, 2015	
Mark Giordano	Played in NHL All-Star game	January 10, 2015	
Johnny Gaudreau	Played in NHL All-Star game	January 10, 2015	
Jiri Hudler	NHL First Star of the Week	March 9, 2015	
Johnny Gaudreau	NHL Rookie of the Month – March 2015	April 1, 2015	
Jiri Hudler	NHL Second Star of the Month – March 2015	April 1, 2015	
Bob Hartley	Jack Adams Award	June 24, 2015	
Jiri Hudler	Lady Byng Memorial Trophy	June 24, 2015	
Johnny Gaudreau	NHL All-Rookie Team	June 24, 2015	

=== Milestones ===
Player	Milestone	Reached	Ref
Mason Raymond	100th NHL goal	October 9, 2014	
Josh Jooris	1st NHL game 1st NHL goal	October 17, 2014	
Micheal Ferland	1st NHL game	October 31, 2014	
Paul Byron	100th NHL game	November 14, 2014	
Micheal Ferland	1st NHL assist 1st NHL point	November 22, 2014	
Sean Monahan	100th NHL game	November 29, 2014	
Josh Jooris	1st NHL hat trick	December 2, 2014	
Bob Hartley	400th NHL coaching win	December 4, 2014	
Karri Ramo	100th NHL game	December 4, 2014	
Johnny Gaudreau	1st NHL hat trick	December 22, 2014	
Joni Ortio	1st NHL shutout	January 10, 2015	
David Wolf	1st NHL game	January 31, 2015	
Mark Giordano	500th NHL game	February 2, 2015	
Emile Poirier	1st NHL game	February 25, 2015	
Emile Poirier	1st NHL point (assist)	March 3, 2015	
Deryk Engelland	300th NHL game	March 3, 2015	
Kris Russell	500th NHL game	March 17, 2015	
Micheal Ferland	1st NHL goal	March 29, 2015	
Sam Bennett	1st NHL game 1st NHL point (assist)	April 11, 2015	
John Ramage	1st NHL game	April 11, 2015	
Brett Kulak	1st NHL game	April 11, 2015	

== Transactions ==
=== Player re-signings ===
Date	Player	Contract terms (in U.S. dollars)	Ref
July 3, 2014	Paul Byron	1-year, $600,000	
July 12, 2014	Ben Hanowski	1-year, $850,500	
July 22, 2014	Joe Colborne	2-years, $2.55 million	
July 24, 2014	Joni Ortio	2-years, $1.2 million	
July 25, 2014	Sam Bennett	3-years, $2.775 million entry-level contract	
July 26, 2014	Mark Cundari	1-year, $660,000	
August 27, 2014	Lance Bouma	1-year, $775,000	
October 20, 2014	T. J. Brodie	5-years, $23.25 million (begins 2015–16)	

=== Trades ===
June 28, 2014	To Calgary Flames Brandon Bollig	To Chicago Blackhawks PIT's Third round pick in 2014
January 9, 2015	To Calgary Flames Drew Shore	To Florida Panthers Corban Knight
March 1, 2015	To Calgary Flames Second round pick in 2015; Third round pick in 2015	To Washington Capitals Curtis Glencross
March 2, 2015	To Calgary Flames Second round pick in 2015	To Vancouver Canucks Sven Baertschi

=== Additions and subtractions ===
Additions
Date	Player	Former team	Via	Contract terms Free agents (US$)	Ref
July 1, 2014	Mason Raymond	Toronto Maple Leafs	Free agency	3-years, $9.45 million	
July 1, 2014	Jonas Hiller	Anaheim Ducks	Free agency	2-years, $9 million	
July 1, 2014	Deryk Engelland	Pittsburgh Penguins	Free agency	3-years, $8.75 million	
August 23, 2014	Devin Setoguchi	Winnipeg Jets	Free agency	1-year, $750,000	
September 5, 2014	Corey Potter	Boston Bruins	Free agency	1-year, $700,000	
October 6, 2014	Raphael Diaz	New York Rangers	Free agency	1-year, $700,000	
March 1, 2015	David Schlemko	Dallas Stars	Waivers		

Subtractions
Date	Player	New team	Via	Ref
June 30, 2014	Shane O'Brien	Florida Panthers	Compliance buyout	
July 1, 2014	Michael Cammalleri	New Jersey Devils	Free agency	
July 1, 2014	Ben Street	Colorado Avalanche	Free agency	
July 1, 2014	Blair Jones	Philadelphia Flyers	Free agency	
July 1, 2014	Joey MacDonald	Montreal Canadiens	Free agency	
July 16, 2014	Chris Butler	St. Louis Blues	Free agency	
July 28, 2014	Derek Smith	ZSC Lions	Free agency	
August 1, 2014	TJ Galiardi	Winnipeg Jets	Free agency	

== Draft picks ==
The Flames entered the 2014 NHL entry draft with the fourth overall selection. It is the highest the Flames have ever picked in their 35 years in Calgary, and the highest in franchise history since Tom Lysiak as chosen second overall by the Atlanta Flames in 1973. With the selection, the Flames chose centre Sam Bennett from the Kingston Frontenacs. Bennett was the top-ranked North American skater in the draft according to the NHL Central Scouting Bureau, and his playing style has been compared to that of Hockey Hall of Famer Doug Gilmour. Calgary opted to draft larger players throughout the draft; after choosing goaltender Mason McDonald in the second round, the team added six-foot, seven-inch tall Hunter Smith, also in the second round, and added three other players over six feet, two inches tall.

Rnd	Pick	Player	Nationality	Pos	Team (league)	NHL statistics				
Rnd	Pick	Player	Nationality	Pos	Team (league)	GP	G	A	Pts	PIM
1	4	Sam Bennett^{†}	Canada	C	Kingston Frontenacs (OHL)	1	0	1	1	0
2	34	Mason McDonald	Canada	G	Charlottetown Islanders (QMJHL)					
2	54^{a}	Hunter Smith	Canada	RW	Oshawa Generals (OHL)					
3	64	Brandon Hickey	Canada	D	Spruce Grove Saints (AJHL)					
6	175^{c}	Adam Ollas Mattsson	Sweden	D	Djurgardens IF Jr. (Sweden Jr.)					
7	184	Austin Carroll	Canada	RW	Victoria Royals (WHL)					

Statistics are updated to the end of the 2014–15 NHL season. ^{†} denotes player was on an NHL roster in 2014–15.

Draft notes

- ^{a} The Colorado Avalanche's second-round pick went to the Calgary Flames as the result of a trade on March 5, 2014, that sent Reto Berra to Colorado in exchange for this pick.
- The Calgary Flames' fourth-round pick went to the Toronto Maple Leafs as the result of a trade on September 29, 2013, that sent Joe Colborne to Calgary in exchange for this conditional pick.
  - Condition – Third round if Colborne scores 10 goals or 35 points during 2013–14 season and if Flames qualify for 2014 playoffs, else fourth round – was converted on March 30, 2014.
- The Calgary Flames' fifth-round pick went to the St. Louis Blues as the result of a trade on July 5, 2013, that sent Kris Russell to Calgary in exchange for this pick.
- The Calgary Flames' sixth-round pick went to the Dallas Stars as the result of a trade on November 22, 2013, that sent Lane MacDermid to Calgary in exchange for this pick.
- ^{c} The Anaheim Ducks' sixth-round pick went to the Calgary Flames as the result of a trade on November 21, 2013, that sent Tim Jackman to Anaheim in exchange for this pick.

== Adirondack Flames ==
After five seasons of play in Abbotsford, British Columbia, the city opted to terminate its lease with the Flames' American Hockey League (AHL) affiliate, the Abbotsford Heat. The city paid $5.5 million to cancel the deal, part of $12 million in losses the city suffered during the team's tenure. As a result, the Flames announced that the franchise would relocate to Glens Falls, New York, for the 2014–15 AHL season and renamed the Adirondack Flames.
