= 2014–15 Edmonton Oilers season =

NHL team season

2014–15 Edmonton Oilers
- Division: 6th Pacific
- Conference: 13th Western
- 2014–15 record: 24–44–14
- Home record: 15–23–3
- Road record: 9–21–11
- Goals for: 198
- Goals against: 283

Team information
- General manager: Craig MacTavish
- Coach: Dallas Eakins (Oct.–Dec.); Todd Nelson (interim, Dec.–Apr.)
- Captain: Andrew Ference
- Alternate captains: Jordan Eberle; Taylor Hall
- Arena: Rexall Place
- Average attendance: 16,839 (100%) (41 games)
- Minor league affiliates: Oklahoma City Barons (AHL); Bakersfield Condors (ECHL)

Team leaders
- Goals: Ryan Nugent-Hopkins (24)
- Assists: Jordan Eberle (39)
- Points: Jordan Eberle (63)
- Penalty minutes: Matt Hendricks (76)
- Plus/minus: Steve Pinizzotto (+1)
- Wins: Ben Scrivens (15)
- Goals against average: Laurent Brossoit (2.00)

The 2014–15 Edmonton Oilers season was the 36th season for the National Hockey League (NHL) franchise that was established on June 22, 1979, and 43rd season including their play in the World Hockey Association (WHA). The Oilers missed the playoffs for the 9th straight season for the first time in franchise history.

== Off-season ==
On April 21, 2014, the Oilers announced that Bill Scott had accepted the position of assistant general manager, replacing Rick Olczyk.

On June 10, 2014, the Oilers hired Craig Ramsay as an assistant coach, replacing Kelly Buchberger. Buchberger will move into a new role in player personnel.

On June 23, 2014, the Oilers announced that Assistant Coach Steve Smith would leave the organization and he would end up being with the Carolina Hurricanes.

== Standings ==
Pacific Division
| Pos | Team | GP | W | L | OTL | ROW | GF | GA | GD | Pts |
|---|---|---|---|---|---|---|---|---|---|---|
| 1 | z – Anaheim Ducks | 82 | 51 | 24 | 7 | 43 | 236 | 226 | +10 | 109 |
| 2 | x – Vancouver Canucks | 82 | 48 | 29 | 5 | 42 | 242 | 222 | +20 | 101 |
| 3 | x – Calgary Flames | 82 | 45 | 30 | 7 | 41 | 241 | 216 | +25 | 97 |
| 4 | Los Angeles Kings | 82 | 40 | 27 | 15 | 38 | 220 | 205 | +15 | 95 |
| 5 | San Jose Sharks | 82 | 40 | 33 | 9 | 36 | 228 | 232 | −4 | 89 |
| 6 | Edmonton Oilers | 82 | 24 | 44 | 14 | 19 | 198 | 283 | −85 | 62 |
| 7 | Arizona Coyotes | 82 | 24 | 50 | 8 | 19 | 170 | 272 | −102 | 56 |

Source: National Hockey League
x – Clinched playoff spot; z – Clinched conference

Western Conference Wild Card
| Pos | Div | Team | GP | W | L | OTL | ROW | GF | GA | GD | Pts |
|---|---|---|---|---|---|---|---|---|---|---|---|
| 1 | CE | x – Minnesota Wild | 82 | 46 | 28 | 8 | 42 | 231 | 201 | +30 | 100 |
| 2 | CE | x – Winnipeg Jets | 82 | 43 | 26 | 13 | 36 | 230 | 210 | +20 | 99 |
| 3 | PA | Los Angeles Kings | 82 | 40 | 27 | 15 | 38 | 220 | 205 | +15 | 95 |
| 4 | CE | Dallas Stars | 82 | 41 | 31 | 10 | 37 | 261 | 260 | +1 | 92 |
| 5 | CE | Colorado Avalanche | 82 | 39 | 31 | 12 | 29 | 219 | 227 | −8 | 90 |
| 6 | PA | San Jose Sharks | 82 | 40 | 33 | 9 | 36 | 228 | 232 | −4 | 89 |
| 7 | PA | Edmonton Oilers | 82 | 24 | 44 | 14 | 19 | 198 | 283 | −85 | 62 |
| 8 | PA | Arizona Coyotes | 82 | 24 | 50 | 8 | 19 | 170 | 272 | −102 | 56 |

Source: National Hockey League
x – Clinched playoff spot

== Suspensions/fines ==
| Player | Explanation | Length | Salary | Date issued |
|---|---|---|---|---|
| Andrew Ference | Illegal check to the head of Vancouver Canucks forward Zack Kassian during NHL game No. 163 in Edmonton on Saturday, November 1, 2014, at 14:03 of the second period. | 3 games | $118,902.45 | November 3, 2014 |
| Keith Aulie | Illegal check to the head of Calgary Flames forward Matt Stajan during NHL game No. 555 in Calgary on Wednesday, December 31, 2014, at 19:05 of the first period. | 2 games | $8,602.16 | January 1, 2015 |

== Schedule and results ==
=== Pre-season ===
Pre-season game log

Rookie tournament: 2–0–1
| # | Date | Visitor | Score | Home | OT | Decision | Attendance | Record | Recap |
|---|---|---|---|---|---|---|---|---|---|
| 1 | September 12^{[a]} | Vancouver | 3–4 | Edmonton | | Brossoit | 4,408 | 1–0–0 | Recap |
| 2 | September 13^{[a]} | Calgary | 3–4 | Edmonton | | Rimmer | 3,060 | 2–0–0 | Recap |
| 3 | September 15^{[a]} | Edmonton | 4–5 | Winnipeg | SO | Tuohimaa | 1,951 | 2–0–1 | Recap |
^{[a]}Game was played at South Okanagan Events Centre in Penticton, British Columbia.

September/October: 4–4–0 (Home: 3–2–0; Road: 1–2–0)
| # | Date | Visitor | Score | Home | OT | Decision | Attendance | Record | Recap |
|---|---|---|---|---|---|---|---|---|---|
| 1 | September 21 | Calgary | 1–3 | Edmonton | | Scrivens | 16,839 | 1–0–0 | Recap |
| 2 | September 21 | Edmonton | 0–1 | Calgary | | Fasth | 19,289 | 1–1–0 | Recap |
| 3 | September 24 | Edmonton | 3–2 | Winnipeg | | Brossoit | 14,723 | 2–1–0 | Recap |
| 4^{[a]} | September 28 | Chicago | 5–0 | Edmonton | | Bachman | | 2–2–0 | Recap |
| 5 | September 29 | Winnipeg | 1–3 | Edmonton | | Fasth | 16,839 | 3–2–0 | Recap |
| 6 | October 1 | Arizona | 2–3 | Edmonton | | Scrivens | 16,839 | 4–2–0 | Recap |
| 7 | October 2 | Vancouver | 2–1 | Edmonton | | Fasth | 16,839 | 4–3–0 | Recap |
| 8 | October 4 | Edmonton | 2–3 | Vancouver | | Scrivens | 18,802 | 4–4–0 | Recap |
Notes:^{a} Game was played at Credit Union Centre in Saskatoon, Saskatchewan.

=== Regular season ===
Game log

October: 4–5–1 (Home: 4–3–0; Road: 0–2–1)
| # | Date | Visitor | Score | Home | OT | Decision | Attendance | Record | Pts | Recap |
|---|---|---|---|---|---|---|---|---|---|---|
| 1 | October 9 | Calgary | 5–2 | Edmonton | | Scrivens | 16,839 | 0–1–0 | 0 | Recap |
| 2 | October 11 | Edmonton | 4–5 | Vancouver | SO | Fasth | 18,870 | 0–1–1 | 1 | Recap |
| 3 | October 14 | Edmonton | 1–6 | Los Angeles | | Fasth | 18,230 | 0–2–1 | 1 | Recap |
| 4 | October 15 | Edmonton | 4–7 | Arizona | | Scrivens | 11,648 | 0–3–1 | 1 | Recap |
| 5 | October 17 | Vancouver | 2–0 | Edmonton | | Scrivens | 16,839 | 0–4–1 | 1 | Recap |
| 6 | October 20 | Tampa Bay | 2–3 | Edmonton | | Scrivens | 16,839 | 1–4–1 | 3 | Recap |
| 7 | October 22 | Washington | 2–3 | Edmonton | | Scrivens | 16,839 | 2–4–1 | 5 | Recap |
| 8 | October 24 | Carolina | 3–6 | Edmonton | | Scrivens | 16,839 | 3–4–1 | 7 | Recap |
| 9 | October 27 | Montreal | 0–3 | Edmonton | | Scrivens | 16,839 | 4–4–1 | 9 | Recap |
| 10 | October 29 | Nashville | 4–1 | Edmonton | | Scrivens | 16,839 | 4–5–1 | 9 | Recap |

November: 2–9–3 (Home: 0–5–1; Road: 2–3–2)
| # | Date | Visitor | Score | Home | OT | Decision | Attendance | Record | Pts | Recap |
|---|---|---|---|---|---|---|---|---|---|---|
| 11 | November 1 | Vancouver | 3–2 | Edmonton | | Scrivens | 16,839 | 4–6–1 | 9 | Recap |
| 12 | November 4 | Edmonton | 1–4 | Philadelphia | | Fasth | 19,566 | 4–7–1 | 9 | Recap |
| 13 | November 6 | Edmonton | 2–5 | Boston | | Scrivens | 17,565 | 4–8–1 | 9 | Recap |
| 14 | November 7 | Edmonton | 3–2 | Buffalo | | Fasth | 17,490 | 5–8–1 | 11 | Recap |
| 15 | November 9 | Edmonton | 3–1 | NY Rangers | | Fasth | 18,006 | 6–8–1 | 13 | Recap |
| 16 | November 11 | Edmonton | 2–3 | Nashville | | Fasth | 17,129 | 6–9–1 | 13 | Recap |
| 17 | November 13 | Ottawa | 4–3 | Edmonton | OT | Scrivens | 16,839 | 6–9–2 | 14 | Recap |
| 18 | November 16 | Arizona | 2–1 | Edmonton | | Scrivens | 16,839 | 6–10–2 | 14 | Recap |
| 19 | November 19 | Vancouver | 5–4 | Edmonton | | Scrivens | 16,839 | 6–11–2 | 14 | Recap |
| 20 | November 21 | New Jersey | 2–0 | Edmonton | | Fasth | 16,839 | 6–12–2 | 14 | Recap |
| 21 | November 22 | Chicago | 7–1 | Edmonton | | Scrivens | 16,839 | 6–13–2 | 14 | Recap |
| 22 | November 25 | Edmonton | 2–3 | Dallas | | Fasth | 16,322 | 6–14–2 | 14 | Recap |
| 23 | November 27 | Edmonton | 0–1 | Nashville | OT | Fasth | 17,113 | 6–14–3 | 15 | Recap |
| 24 | November 28 | Edmonton | 3–4 | St. Louis | OT | Scrivens | 17,666 | 6–14–4 | 16 | Recap |

December: 2–8–4 (Home: 2–3–1; Road: 0–4–3)
| # | Date | Visitor | Score | Home | OT | Decision | Attendance | Record | Pts | Recap |
|---|---|---|---|---|---|---|---|---|---|---|
| 25 | December 1 | Arizona | 5–2 | Edmonton | | Fasth | 16,839 | 6–15–4 | 16 | Recap |
| 26 | December 3 | Edmonton | 2–3 | Winnipeg | OT | Scrivens | 15,016 | 6–15–5 | 17 | Recap |
| 27 | December 7 | San Jose | 1–2 | Edmonton | | Scrivens | 16,839 | 7–15–5 | 19 | Recap |
| 28 | December 9 | Edmonton | 2–5 | San Jose | | Scrivens | 17,007 | 7–16–5 | 19 | Recap |
| 29 | December 10 | Edmonton | 1–2 | Anaheim | | Fasth | 16,371 | 7–17–5 | 19 | Recap |
| 30 | December 12 | Anaheim | 4–2 | Edmonton | | Fasth | 16,839 | 7–18–5 | 19 | Recap |
| 31 | December 14 | NY Rangers | 2–0 | Edmonton | | Scrivens | 16,839 | 7–19–5 | 19 | Recap |
| 32 | December 16 | Edmonton | 1–2 | Arizona | OT | Scrivens | 12,085 | 7–19–6 | 20 | Recap |
| 33 | December 18 | Edmonton | 3–4 | San Jose | | Scrivens | 17,389 | 7–20–6 | 20 | Recap |
| 34 | December 21 | Dallas | 6–5 | Edmonton | SO | Scrivens | 16,839 | 7–20–7 | 21 | Recap |
| 35 | December 23 | Arizona | 5–1 | Edmonton | | Scrivens | 16,839 | 7–21–7 | 21 | Recap |
| 36 | December 27 | Edmonton | 1–4 | Calgary | | Fasth | 19,289 | 7–22–7 | 21 | Recap |
| 37 | December 30 | Los Angeles | 2–3 | Edmonton | SO | Scrivens | 16,839 | 8–22–7 | 23 | Recap |
| 38 | December 31 | Edmonton | 3–4 | Calgary | OT | Scrivens | 19,289 | 8–22–8 | 24 | Recap |

January: 5–6–1 (Home: 3–3–0; Road: 2–3–1)
| # | Date | Visitor | Score | Home | OT | Decision | Attendance | Record | Pts | Recap |
|---|---|---|---|---|---|---|---|---|---|---|
| 39 | January 2 | Edmonton | 1–2 | Colorado | SO | Scrivens | 16,050 | 8–22–9 | 25 | Recap |
| 40 | January 4 | NY Islanders | 2–5 | Edmonton | | Scrivens | 16,839 | 9–22–9 | 27 | Recap |
| 41 | January 6 | Detroit | 4–2 | Edmonton | | Fasth | 16,839 | 9–23–9 | 27 | Recap |
| 42 | January 9 | Chicago | 2–5 | Edmonton | | Scrivens | 16,839 | 10–23–9 | 29 | Recap |
| 43 | January 11 | Florida | 4–2 | Edmonton | | Scrivens | 16,839 | 10–24–9 | 29 | Recap |
| 44 | January 13 | Edmonton | 2–4 | St. Louis | | Scrivens | 18,279 | 10–25–9 | 29 | Recap |
| 45 | January 15 | Edmonton | 2–3 | Tampa Bay | | Scrivens | 18,609 | 10–26–9 | 29 | Recap |
| 46 | January 17 | Edmonton | 3–2 | Florida | SO | Fasth | 10,529 | 11–26–9 | 31 | Recap |
| 47 | January 20 | Edmonton | 5–4 | Washington | SO | Fasth | 18,506 | 12–26–9 | 33 | Recap |
| 48 | January 27 | Minnesota | 2–1 | Edmonton | | Fasth | 16,839 | 12–27–9 | 33 | Recap |
| 49 | January 29 | Buffalo | 2–3 | Edmonton | | Scrivens | 16,839 | 13–27–9 | 35 | Recap |
| 50 | January 31 | Edmonton | 2–4 | Calgary | | Scrivens | 19,289 | 13–28–9 | 35 | Recap |

February: 5–7–1 (Home: 1–4–0; Road: 4–3–1)
| # | Date | Visitor | Score | Home | OT | Decision | Attendance | Record | Pts | Recap |
|---|---|---|---|---|---|---|---|---|---|---|
| 51 | February 2 | Edmonton | 5–4 | San Jose | SO | Fasth | 17,376 | 14–28–9 | 37 | Recap |
| 52 | February 4 | Pittsburgh | 2–0 | Edmonton | | Fasth | 16,839 | 14–29–9 | 37 | Recap |
| 53 | February 7 | Edmonton | 1–5 | Toronto | | Fasth | 19,248 | 14–30–9 | 37 | Recap |
| 54 | February 9 | Edmonton | 2–1 | New Jersey | | Scrivens | 11,519 | 15–30–9 | 39 | Recap |
| 55 | February 10 | Edmonton | 2–3 | NY Islanders | | Fasth | 15,608 | 15–31–9 | 39 | Recap |
| 56 | February 12 | Edmonton | 4–3 | Montreal | OT | Fasth | 21,287 | 16–31–9 | 41 | Recap |
| 57 | February 14 | Edmonton | 2–7 | Ottawa | | Fasth | 17,160 | 16–32–9 | 41 | Recap |
| 58 | February 16 | Edmonton | 4–5 | Winnipeg | SO | Fasth | 15,016 | 16–32–10 | 42 | Recap |
| 59 | February 18 | Boston | 3–4 | Edmonton | SO | Scrivens | 16,839 | 17–32–10 | 44 | Recap |
| 60 | February 20 | Minnesota | 4–0 | Edmonton | | Scrivens | 16,839 | 17–33–10 | 44 | Recap |
| 61 | February 21 | Anaheim | 2–1 | Edmonton | | Scrivens | 16,839 | 17–34–10 | 44 | Recap |
| 62 | February 24 | Edmonton | 2–1 | Minnesota | | Scrivens | 19,044 | 18–34–10 | 46 | Recap |
| 63 | February 28 | St. Louis | 2–1 | Edmonton | | Scrivens | 16,839 | 18–35–10 | 46 | Recap |

March: 5–5–3 (Home: 4–2–1; Road: 1–3–2)
| # | Date | Visitor | Score | Home | OT | Decision | Attendance | Record | Pts | Recap |
|---|---|---|---|---|---|---|---|---|---|---|
| 64 | March 3 | Los Angeles | 5–2 | Edmonton | | Scrivens | 16,839 | 18–36–10 | 46 | Recap |
| 65 | March 6 | Edmonton | 1–2 | Chicago | SO | Scrivens | 22,017 | 18–36–11 | 47 | Recap |
| 66 | March 8 | Edmonton | 4–7 | Carolina | | Bachman | 12,826 | 18–37–11 | 47 | Recap |
| 67 | March 9 | Edmonton | 2–5 | Detroit | | Scrivens | 20,027 | 18–38–11 | 47 | Recap |
| 68 | March 12 | Edmonton | 4–6 | Pittsburgh | | Bachman | 18,662 | 18–39–11 | 47 | Recap |
| 69 | March 13 | Edmonton | 4–5 | Columbus | SO | Scrivens | 14,317 | 18–39–12 | 48 | Recap |
| 70 | March 16 | Toronto | 1–4 | Edmonton | | Scrivens | 16,839 | 19–39–12 | 50 | Recap |
| 71 | March 18 | Columbus | 4–3 | Edmonton | SO | Scrivens | 16,839 | 19–39–13 | 51 | Recap |
| 72 | March 21 | Philadelphia | 4–5 | Edmonton | OT | Scrivens | 16,839 | 20–39–13 | 53 | Recap |
| 73 | March 23 | Winnipeg | 4–1 | Edmonton | | Scrivens | 16,839 | 20–40–13 | 53 | Recap |
| 74 | March 25 | Colorado | 3–4 | Edmonton | | Scrivens | 16,839 | 21–40–13 | 55 | Recap |
| 75 | March 27 | Dallas | 0–4 | Edmonton | | Bachman | 16,839 | 22–40–13 | 57 | Recap |
| 76 | March 30 | Edmonton | 4–1 | Colorado | | Bachman | 15,493 | 23–40–13 | 59 | Recap |

April: 1–4–1 (Home: 1–2–0; Road: 0–2–1)
| # | Date | Visitor | Score | Home | OT | Decision | Attendance | Record | Pts | Recap |
|---|---|---|---|---|---|---|---|---|---|---|
| 77 | April 1 | Edmonton | 1–5 | Anaheim | | Scrivens | 17,174 | 23–41–13 | 59 | Recap |
| 78 | April 2 | Edmonton | 2–8 | Los Angeles | | Scrivens | 18,230 | 23–42–13 | 59 | Recap |
| 79 | April 4 | Calgary | 4–0 | Edmonton | | Scrivens | 16,839 | 23–43–13 | 59 | Recap |
| 80 | April 7 | Los Angeles | 2–4 | Edmonton | | Bachman | 16,839 | 24–43–13 | 61 | Recap |
| 81 | April 9 | San Jose | 3–1 | Edmonton | | Brossoit | 16,839 | 24–44–13 | 61 | Recap |
| 82 | April 11 | Edmonton | 5–6 | Vancouver | OT | Scrivens | 18,870 | 24–44–14 | 62 | Recap |

Legend: Win (2 points) Loss (0 points) Overtime/shootout loss (1 point)

== Player statistics ==
Final stats

Skaters

Regular season
| Player | GP | G | A | Pts | +/− | PIM |
|---|---|---|---|---|---|---|
| Jordan Eberle | 81 | 24 | 39 | 63 | −16 | 24 |
| Ryan Nugent-Hopkins | 76 | 24 | 32 | 56 | −12 | 25 |
| Taylor Hall | 53 | 14 | 24 | 38 | −1 | 40 |
| Benoit Pouliot | 58 | 19 | 15 | 34 | −1 | 28 |
| Teddy Purcell | 82 | 12 | 22 | 34 | −33 | 24 |
| Nail Yakupov | 81 | 14 | 19 | 33 | −35 | 18 |
| Justin Schultz | 81 | 6 | 25 | 31 | −17 | 12 |
| Derek Roy^{†} | 46 | 11 | 11 | 22 | −13 | 22 |
| Anton Lander | 38 | 6 | 14 | 20 | −12 | 14 |
| Oscar Klefbom | 60 | 2 | 18 | 20 | −21 | 4 |
| David Perron^{‡} | 38 | 5 | 14 | 19 | −17 | 20 |
| Matt Hendricks | 71 | 8 | 8 | 16 | −14 | 76 |
| Jeff Petry^{‡} | 59 | 4 | 11 | 15 | −25 | 32 |
| Andrew Ference | 70 | 3 | 11 | 14 | −17 | 39 |
| Boyd Gordon | 68 | 6 | 7 | 13 | −5 | 17 |
| Mark Arcobello^{‡} | 36 | 7 | 5 | 12 | −7 | 12 |
| Nikita Nikitin | 42 | 4 | 6 | 10 | −12 | 12 |
| Matt Fraser^{†} | 36 | 5 | 4 | 9 | −11 | 10 |
| Leon Draisaitl | 37 | 2 | 7 | 9 | −17 | 4 |
| Mark Fayne | 74 | 2 | 6 | 8 | −21 | 14 |
| Andrew Miller | 9 | 1 | 5 | 6 | −2 | 0 |
| Martin Marincin | 41 | 1 | 4 | 5 | −4 | 16 |
| Jesse Joensuu | 20 | 2 | 2 | 4 | −8 | 14 |
| Steve Pinizzotto | 18 | 2 | 2 | 4 | 1 | 30 |
| Luke Gazdic | 40 | 2 | 1 | 3 | −4 | 43 |
| Rob Klinkhammer^{†} | 40 | 1 | 2 | 3 | −7 | 23 |
| Iiro Pakarinen | 17 | 1 | 2 | 3 | −4 | 2 |
| Brad Hunt | 11 | 1 | 2 | 3 | −6 | 0 |
| Tyler Pitlick | 17 | 2 | 0 | 2 | −3 | 4 |
| Ryan Hamilton | 16 | 1 | 1 | 2 | −8 | 6 |
| David Musil | 4 | 0 | 2 | 2 | −2 | 2 |
| Brandon Davidson | 12 | 1 | 0 | 1 | −5 | 0 |
| Keith Aulie | 31 | 0 | 1 | 1 | −3 | 66 |
| Jordan Oesterle | 6 | 0 | 1 | 1 | −4 | 0 |
| Curtis Hamilton | 1 | 0 | 0 | 0 | 0 | 5 |
| Bogdan Yakimov | 1 | 0 | 0 | 0 | −1 | 0 |
| Darnell Nurse | 2 | 0 | 0 | 0 | −2 | 0 |
| Will Acton^{‡} | 3 | 0 | 0 | 0 | −2 | 5 |

Goaltenders

Regular season
| Player | GP | GS | TOI | W | L | OT | GA | GAA | SA | SV% | SO | G | A | PIM |
|---|---|---|---|---|---|---|---|---|---|---|---|---|---|---|
| Ben Scrivens | 57 | 53 | 3228 | 15 | 26 | 11 | 170 | 3.16 | 1542 | .890 | 1 | 0 | 1 | 4 |
| Viktor Fasth | 26 | 24 | 1336 | 6 | 15 | 3 | 76 | 3.41 | 681 | .888 | 0 | 0 | 0 | 0 |
| Richard Bachman | 7 | 4 | 317 | 3 | 2 | 0 | 15 | 2.84 | 168 | .911 | 1 | 0 | 0 | 0 |
| Laurent Brossoit | 1 | 1 | 60 | 0 | 1 | 0 | 2 | 2.00 | 51 | .961 | 0 | 0 | 0 | 0 |
| Tyler Bunz | 1 | 0 | 20 | 0 | 0 | 0 | 3 | 9.00 | 12 | .750 | 0 | 0 | 0 | 0 |

^{†}Denotes player spent time with another team before joining the Oilers. Stats reflect time with the Oilers only.
^{‡}Traded mid-season. Stats reflect time with the Oilers only.
Bold/italics denotes franchise record

== Awards and honours ==
=== Awards ===
Regular season
| Player | Award | Awarded |
|---|---|---|
| Ben Scrivens | NHL Second Star of the Week | October 27, 2014 |
| Ryan Nugent-Hopkins | NHL All-Star game selection | January 10, 2015 |

== Milestones ==
Regular season
| Player | Milestone | Reached |
|---|---|---|
| Leon Draisaitl | 1st NHL Game | October 9, 2014 |
| Mark Fayne | 100th NHL PIM | October 11, 2014 |
| Brad Hunt | 1st NHL Goal; 1st NHL Point | October 11, 2014 |
| Darnell Nurse | 1st NHL Game | October 14, 2014 |
| Bogdan Yakimov | 1st NHL Game | October 14, 2014 |
| Leon Draisaitl | 1st NHL Assist; 1st NHL Point | October 15, 2014 |
| Leon Draisaitl | 1st NHL Goal | October 24, 2014 |
| Matt Hendricks | 500th NHL PIM | November 4, 2014 |
| Iiro Pakarinen | 1st NHL Game | November 6, 2014 |
| Iiro Pakarinen | 1st NHL Goal; 1st NHL Point | November 7, 2014 |
| Jordan Eberle | 100th NHL Goal | November 13, 2014 |
| Steve Pinizzotto | 1st NHL Goal; 1st NHL Gordie Howe hat trick | November 19, 2014 |
| Ryan Nugent-Hopkins | 200th NHL Game | November 21, 2014 |
| Taylor Hall | 100th NHL Goal | November 25, 2014 |
| Ryan Nugent-Hopkins | 100th NHL Assist | November 25, 2014 |
| Jordan Eberle | 300th NHL Game | December 3, 2014 |
| Brandon Davidson | 1st NHL Game | December 10, 2014 |
| Brad Hunt | 1st NHL Assist | December 16, 2014 |
| Ben Scrivens | 100th NHL Game | December 30, 2014 |
| Anton Lander | 100th NHL Game | January 11, 2015 |
| Derek Roy | 700th NHL Game | January 13, 2015 |
| Boyd Gordon | 600th NHL Game | January 15, 2015 |
| Boyd Gordon | 100th NHL Assist | January 17, 2015 |
| Benoit Pouliot | 400th NHL Game | January 20, 2015 |
| Ryan Hamilton | 1st NHL Goal | February 10, 2015 |
| Iiro Pakarinen | 1st NHL Assist | February 10, 2015 |
| Mark Fayne | 300th NHL Game | February 16, 2015 |
| Jordan Oesterle | 1st NHL Game | February 21, 2015 |
| Jordan Oesterle | 1st NHL Assist; 1st NHL Point | March 3, 2015 |
| Ryan Nugent-Hopkins | 2nd NHL Hat-trick | March 8, 2015 |
| Matt Hendricks | 400th NHL Game | March 9, 2015 |
| Andrew Miller | 1st NHL Game | March 19, 2015 |
| Andrew Ference | 900th NHL Game | March 21, 2015 |
| Martin Marincin | 1st NHL Goal | March 25, 2015 |
| Andrew Miller | 1st NHL Assist; 1st NHL Point | March 25, 2015 |
| Luke Gazdic | 100th NHL Game | March 27, 2015 |
| Andrew Miller | 1st NHL Goal | March 27, 2015 |
| Brandon Davidson | 1st NHL Goal; 1st NHL Point | March 30, 2015 |
| Tyler Bunz | 1st NHL Game | April 2, 2015 |
| David Musil | 1st NHL Game | April 4, 2015 |
| Justin Schultz | 200th NHL Game | April 4, 2015 |
| David Musil | 1st NHL Assist; 1st NHL Point | April 7, 2015 |
| Laurent Brossoit | 1st NHL Game | April 9, 2015 |
| Curtis Hamilton | 1st NHL Game | April 9, 2015 |

== Transactions ==
Following the end of the Oilers' 2013–14 season, and during the 2014–15 season, this team has been involved in the following transactions:

=== Trades ===
| Date | Details |
| June 29, 2014 | To Tampa Bay Lightning Sam Gagner | To Edmonton Oilers Teddy Purcell |
| November 20, 2014 | To Vancouver Canucks Will Acton | To Edmonton Oilers Kellan Lain |
| December 29, 2014 | To Nashville Predators Mark Arcobello | To Edmonton Oilers Derek Roy |
| January 2, 2015 | To Pittsburgh Penguins David Perron | To Edmonton Oilers Rob Klinkhammer; 1st-round pick in 2015 |
| March 2, 2015 | To Montreal Canadiens Jeff Petry | To Edmonton Oilers 2nd-round pick in 2015; 4th-round pick in 2015 |

=== Free agents acquired ===
| Date | Player | Former team | Contract terms (in U.S. dollars) | Ref |
| July 1, 2014 | Mark Fayne | New Jersey Devils | 4 years, $14 million | |
| July 1, 2014 | Benoit Pouliot | New York Rangers | 5 years, $20 million | |
| July 1, 2014 | Keith Aulie | Tampa Bay Lightning | 1 year, $800,000 | |
| May 12, 2015 | Eetu Laurikainen | Espoo Blues (Liiga) | 2 years, entry-level contract | |

=== Free agents lost ===
| Date | Player | New team | Contract terms (in U.S. dollars) | Ref |
| July 1, 2014 | Taylor Fedun | San Jose Sharks | 1 year, $600,000 | |
| July 1, 2014 | Denis Grebeshkov | HC Vityaz (KHL) | 1 year | |
| July 1, 2014 | Philip Larsen | HC Yugra (KHL) | 1 year | |
| July 12, 2014 | Ben Eager | CSKA Moscow (KHL) | 1 year | |
| September 11, 2014 | Steve MacIntyre | Norfolk Admirals (AHL) | | |
| November 17, 2014 | Ryan Jones | Kolner Haie (DEL) | 1 year | |
| December 18, 2014 | Mark Fraser | New Jersey Devils | 1 year | |
| April 23, 2015 | Jesse Joensuu | Jokerit (KHL) | | |
| April 30, 2015 | Erik Gustafsson | Chicago Blackhawks | 2 year | |
| May 18, 2015 | Frans Tuohimaa | Leksands IF (SHL) | | |
| May 26, 2015 | Steve Pinizzotto | EHC München (DEL) | | |

=== Claimed via waivers ===
| Player | Former team | Date claimed off waivers |
|---|---|---|
| Matt Fraser | Boston Bruins | December 29, 2014 |

=== Lost via waivers ===
| Player | New team | Date claimed off waivers |

=== Lost via retirement ===
Player
Ryan Smyth

=== Player signings ===
| Date | Player | Contract terms (in U.S. dollars) | Ref |
| July 1, 2014 | Luke Gazdic | 2 years, $1.6 million | |
| July 7, 2014 | Jeff Petry | 1 year, $3.075 million | |
| July 9, 2014 | Richard Bachman | 1 year, $615,000 | |
| July 15, 2014 | Andrew Miller | 1 year, $675,000 | |
| July 15, 2014 | Curtis Hamilton | 1 year, $600,000 | |
| July 15, 2014 | Tyler Pitlick | 1 year, $725,000 | |
| August 12, 2014 | Leon Draisaitl | 3 years, $2.775 million entry-level contract | |
| August 29, 2014 | Justin Schultz | 1 year, $3.675 million | |
| September 13, 2014 | Greg Chase | 3 years, $2.145 million entry-level contract | |
| February 20, 2015 | Rob Klinkhammer | 1 year, $725,000 contract extension | |
| February 20, 2015 | Ryan Hamilton | 1 year, $600,000 contract extension | |
| March 26, 2015 | Ben Betker | 3 years, $2.775 million entry-level contract | |
| March 31, 2015 | Joey LaLeggia | 2 years, $1.85 million entry-level contract | |
| April 2, 2015 | Anton Lander | 2 years, $1.975 million contract extension | |
| April 5, 2015 | Kyle Platzer | 3 years, $2.775 million entry-level contract | |
| April 13, 2015 | Nail Yakupov | 2 years, $5.0 million contract extension | |
| May 27, 2015 | Anton Slepyshev | 3 years, $2.775 million entry-level contract | |

== Draft picks ==
The 2014 NHL entry draft will be held on June 27–28, 2014, at the Wells Fargo Center in Philadelphia, Pennsylvania. Edmonton finished 28th overall in the league, to secure the 3rd overall pick.

| Round | # | Player | Pos | Nationality | College/junior/club team (league) |
|---|---|---|---|---|---|
| 1 | 3 | Leon Draisaitl | (C) | Germany | Prince Albert Raiders (WHL) |
| 4 | 91^{[a]} | William Lagesson | (D) | Sweden | Frolunda HC U20 (J20 SuperElit) |
| 4 | 111^{[b]} | Zachary Nagelvoort | (G) | United States | University of Michigan (Big Ten) |
| 5 | 130^{[c]} | Liam Coughlin | (C/LW) | United States | Vernon Vipers (BCHL) |
| 6 | 153 | Tyler Vesel | (C) | United States | Omaha Lancers (USHL) |
| 7 | 183 | Kevin Bouchard | (G) | Canada | Val-d'Or Foreurs (QMJHL) |

Draft notes

- The Edmonton Oilers' second-round pick went to the St. Louis Blues as the result of a trade on July 10, 2013, that sent David Perron to Edmonton in exchange for Magnus Paajarvi and this pick.
- The Edmonton Oilers' third-round pick went to the Los Angeles Kings as the result of a trade on January 15, 2014, that sent Ben Scrivens to Edmonton in exchange for this pick.
- ^{a} The Buffalo Sabres' fourth-round pick went to the Edmonton Oilers as the result of a trade on March 4, 2014, that sent Ilya Bryzgalov to Minnesota in exchange for this pick.
- ^{b} The San Jose Sharks' fourth-round pick went to the Edmonton Oilers as the result of a trade on October 21, 2013, that sent Mike Brown to San Jose in exchange for this pick.
- The Edmonton Oilers' fourth-round pick went to the Toronto Maple Leafs as the result of a trade on March 4, 2013, that sent Mike Brown to Edmonton in exchange for this pick (being conditional at the time of the trade).
- ^{c} The Ottawa Senators' fifth-round pick went to the Edmonton Oilers as the result of a trade on March 5, 2014, that sent Ales Hemsky to Ottawa in exchange for a third-round pick in 2015 and this pick.
- The Edmonton Oilers' fifth-round pick went to the Anaheim Ducks as the result of a trade on March 4, 2014, that sent Viktor Fasth to Edmonton in exchange for a third-round pick in 2015 and this pick.
