= Sam Bennett (ice hockey) =

Canadian ice hockey player (born 1996)

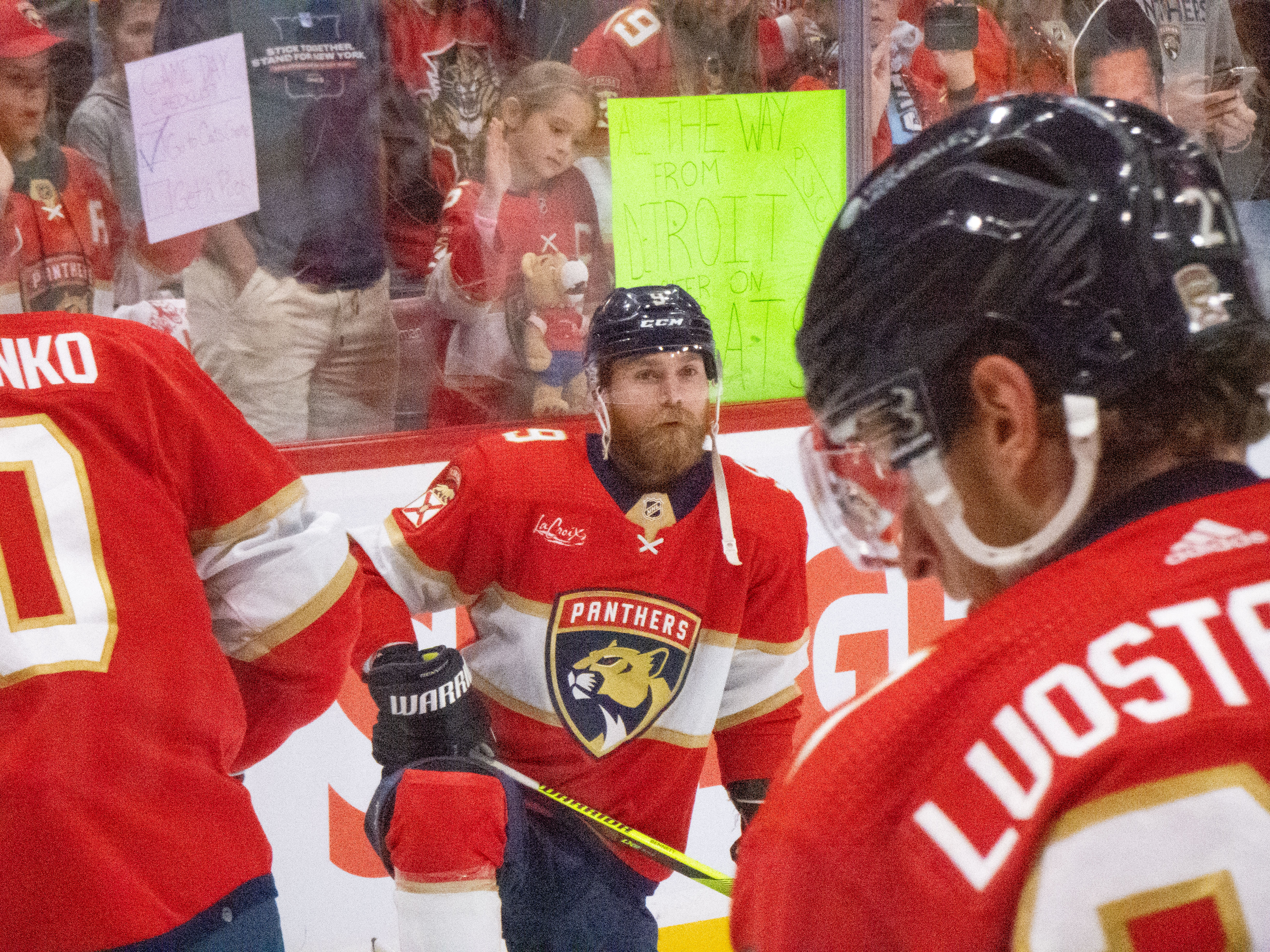
- Bennett with the Florida Panthers in June 2024
- Born: June 20, 1996 (age 30) East Gwillimbury, Ontario, Canada
- Height: 6 ft 1 in (185 cm)
- Weight: 193 lb (88 kg; 13 st 11 lb)
- Position: Forward
- Shoots: Left
- NHL team Former teams: Florida Panthers; Calgary Flames
- National team: Canada
- NHL draft: 4th overall, 2014; Calgary Flames
- Playing career: 2015–present

Samuel Hunter Bennett (born June 20, 1996) is a Canadian professional ice hockey player who is a forward for the Florida Panthers of the National Hockey League (NHL). Bennett was rated by the NHL Central Scouting Bureau as the top North American prospect for the 2014 NHL entry draft, where he was selected fourth overall by the Calgary Flames. Bennett made his NHL debut in the 2014–15 season. Bennett won back-to-back Stanley Cups with the Panthers in 2024 and 2025, winning the Conn Smythe Trophy in the latter. Internationally, Bennett represented Canada at the 2026 Winter Olympics, winning a silver medal.

== Playing career ==
=== Kingston Frontenacs ===
A native of Holland Landing, Ontario, he played minor ice hockey for the York-Simcoe Express and then the Toronto Marlboros. He played in the 2009 Quebec International Pee-Wee Hockey Tournament as a member of York-Simcoe, and was a teammate of Connor McDavid. In 2012, he was selected ninth overall by the Kingston Frontenacs in the Ontario Hockey League (OHL) Priority Selection Draft. He appeared in 40 games with the Frontenacs in 2012–13 and recorded 40 points to earn a place on the OHL's Second All-Rookie Team.

Returning to the Frontenacs for the 2013–14 season, Bennett was among the OHL's scoring leaders by mid-season. He stood fourth with 66 points in 40 games and was on a 24-game scoring streak when he suffered a minor injury that prevented him from participating in the 2014 CHL Top Prospects Game. In its mid-season ranking, the NHL Central Scouting Bureau named Bennett as the top North American prospect for the 2014 NHL entry draft. One of the Bureau's scouts praised Bennett's offensive ability: "His puckhandling and playmaking are excellent and he has one of the best shots in this year's draft class. He has scored several goals from the high slot and coming in off the wing and has been very effective on the power play." Concerns were raised when at the 2014 NHL Scouting Combine, he was unable to do a single pull-up. He retained the top spot in NHL Central Scouting's final ranking after recording nine points in seven playoff games for Kingston despite playing through a groin injury. He finished the regular season with 36 goals and 91 points in 57 games. He was named to the OHL's Third All-Star Team.

The Calgary Flames selected Bennett with the fourth overall selection at the 2014 NHL entry draft, and he quickly signed a three-year, entry-level contract with the club. He attended the team's training camp prior to the 2014–15 season, where he injured his shoulder. Bennett admitted that the shoulder had ailed him the previous season in Kingston, but he initially failed to disclose the issue, stating he "wanted to play" and would "do anything to make the team and play in the NHL this year". Instead, Bennett's injury required surgery to repair, which the Flames said would prevent him from playing for several months. After missing five months of action, Bennett was medically cleared to play and was reassigned to Kingston on February 21, 2015. He scored 24 points in 11 regular season games for Kingston and added 3 assists as the Frontenacs were quickly eliminated in the OHL playoffs.

=== Calgary Flames (2015–2021) ===
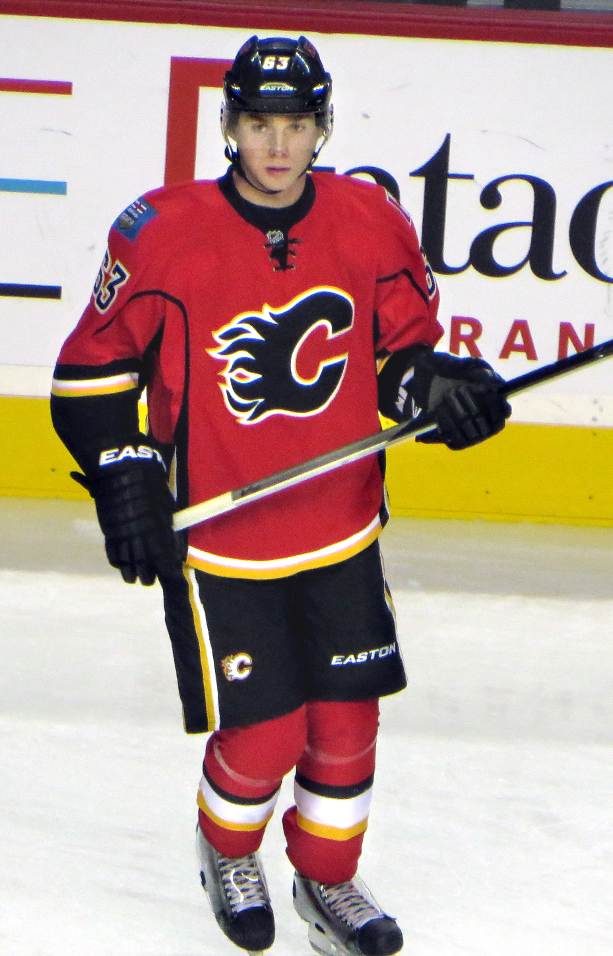
Bennett with the Calgary Flames in October 2014

The Flames recalled Bennett to Calgary after Kingston's season ended, and he made his NHL debut in the team's final regular season game on April 12, against the Winnipeg Jets. He recorded his first career point on his first shift – 33 seconds into the contest – assisting on a Micheal Ferland goal in a 5–1 loss. Bennett was a regular player for the Flames in the 2015 Stanley Cup playoffs, and recorded his first NHL goal on April 19, a game-winner against Eddie Läck of the Vancouver Canucks in a 4–2 victory. Bennett played all 11 playoff games for the Flames, in which he scored three goals and added an assist. On January 13, 2016, Bennett scored four goals against the Florida Panthers. At 19 years and six months, he became the youngest player in Flames history to score a hat-trick, and the third-youngest player in NHL history to score four goals in a game. Bennett scored his first three goals within the first 17 minutes of the game, and added a fourth goal in the last minute of the third period.

On September 6, 2017, the Flames signed Bennett to a two-year, $3.9 million contract extension worth $1.95 million annually. On July 24, 2019, Bennett was re-signed to a two-year contract.

=== Florida Panthers (2021–present) ===
On April 12, 2021, Bennett, along with a sixth-round pick in 2022, was traded to the Florida Panthers in exchange for draft rights to Emil Heineman and a second-round pick in 2022.

Bennett would immediately find offensive success with the Panthers, scoring three goals and two assists in his first three games with the team. In the final 10 games of the season with the team, Bennett would register 15 points, surpassing his point total in 38 games earlier in the season with the Flames.

On July 26, 2021, Bennett signed a four-year, $17.6 million contract extension with the Panthers.

Bennett entered the 2021–22 season hoping to continue his offensive success with the Panthers from last season, and he did just that. On October 16, 2021, in just the second game of the season, Bennett scored his second career hat-trick in a 5–1 win over the New York Islanders. Coincidently, it was his first hat-trick since recording his first one against the Panthers. Playing on a line with Jonathan Huberdeau, Bennett continued to produce offensively throughout the season. Two games after his return to the lineup, Bennett scored another hat-trick, and added an assist for a four point game against the Dallas Stars. The season would prove to be successful for both Bennett and the Panthers, as the team won their first Presidents' Trophy in franchise history, and Bennett scored 28 goals and 21 assists for 49 points, crushing his previous career highs. Bennett would score three points in the Panthers first round series against the Washington Capitals, which they won in six games. However, both Bennett and the Panthers hit an offensive wall as they faced the Lightning in the second round. The Panthers only managed three goals in the series, as they were swept by the Lightning in four games. Bennett would be held off the scoresheet for the entire series.

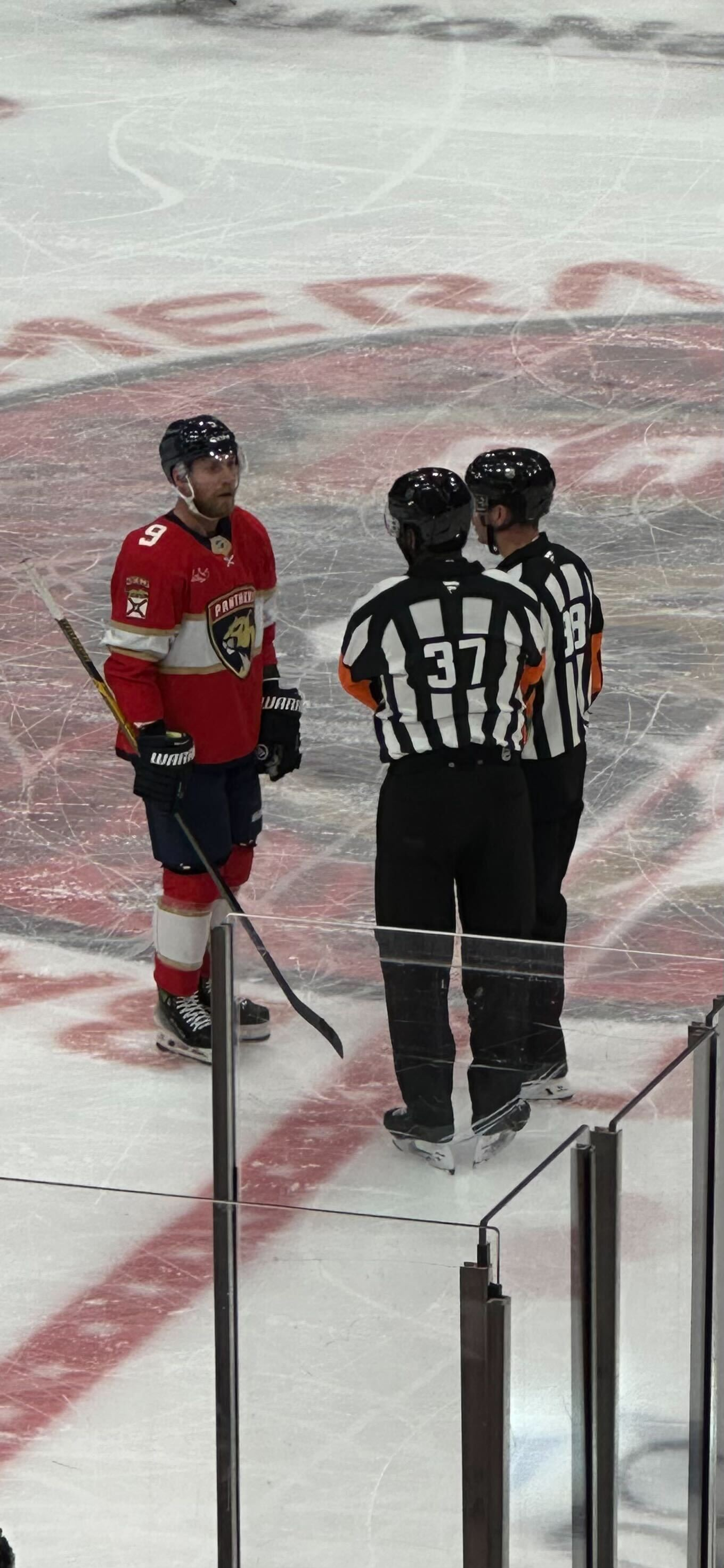
Sam Bennett talks to the referees during a Florida Panthers game against the Vancouver Canucks in November 2025

Coming off a successful season that ended in disappointment, Bennett and the Panthers looked for revenge in the 2022–23 season. Although his usual linemate, Jonathan Huberdeau, was traded to the Flames, Bennett was reunited with longtime Flames teammate Matthew Tkachuk in the deal, and immediately found a new linemate. Although this provided both Bennett and Tkachuk with senses of familiarity, the Panthers were struggling to replicate the same firepower they had the previous year. Injuries plagued the Panthers, including Bennett, who suffered an injury on March 20, 2023 against the Detroit Red Wings that held him out the rest of the regular season. However, he traveled with the team to play the Boston Bruins. Despite missing game 1, Bennett made his return in game 2, scoring a goal in a 6–3 victory. Bennett and the Panthers were heavy underdogs against the Bruins, who broke multiple regular season team records and were one of the most successful regular season teams in NHL history. However, Bennett and the Panthers battled back from a 3–1 series deficit to force a game 7. In game 7, the Panthers came back, and Bennett assisted on Carter Verhaeghe's overtime goal, forcing one of the biggest upsets in NHL history. The Panthers would pull their momentum all the way to the Stanley Cup Final, where they would lose to the Vegas Golden Knights in five games. Bennett scored five goals and ten assists in the playoff run.

Bennett started off the 2023–24 season injured, and would miss the first seven games of the Panthers season. He played his first game of the season on October 30, 2023 against the Bruins, lasting all but eight minutes before leaving the game after getting injured once again. Bennett would return to the lineup on November 12, where he once again find himself a consistent offensive contributor to the Panthers, reaching the 20-goal plateau for the second time in his career, as the Panthers won the Atlantic Division. In game 2 of the Panthers first-round series against the Lightning, Bennett suffered an upper-body injury that would keep him out for the rest of the series. However, the Panthers beat the Lightning in five, and Bennett returned to the team for game 3 against the Bruins, scoring an assist. Bennett and the Panthers went on to win the Stanley Cup in the 2024 Stanley Cup Final, defeating the Edmonton Oilers in seven games after squandering a 3-0 series lead.

In the 2024–25 season, the Panthers traded with the Bruins for Brad Marchand. Reaching the Stanley Cup Final, the Panthers had a rematch with the Oilers and won in six games. Bennett led the playoffs with 15 goals and was awarded the Conn Smythe Trophy as playoff MVP over Panthers teammate Marchand.

== International play ==
Medal record

Men's ice hockey

Representing Canada

Winter Olympics
Silver medal – second place	2026 Milano Cortina	

4 Nations Face-Off
Winner	2025 Canada/United States	

World U18 Championship
Gold medal – first place	2013 Russia	

Ivan Hlinka Memorial Tournament
Gold medal – first place	2013 Czech Republic/Slovakia	

Bennett played for the Canada under-18 team in the 2013 World U18 Championship. He recorded three goals and four assists in seven games as Canada won the gold medal with a 3–2 victory over the United States in the final. He also played on the gold medal-winning Canadian team at the 2013 Ivan Hlinka Memorial Tournament.

Bennett was named to Canada's team for the 2026 Winter Olympics, the first edition with NHL participation since 2014. In the semifinal against Finland, Bennett was placed on the "Rat Line" of agitators with Tom Wilson and Brad Marchand, and though the trio did not score, their hits and forechecking were credited with helping Canada to come back from a 0–2 deficit to win 3–2. In the gold medal game against the United States, during the third period Bennett was called for a double-minor penalty for high-sticking Jack Hughes who lost several front teeth but nonetheless played on while the Canadians managed to kill off the four-minute penalty to preserve the 1–1 tie; then in overtime Hughes scored to give a 2–1 win to the Americans.

== Personal life ==
In 2024, Bennett became engaged to his girlfriend Zoe Zeleny, a volunteer for the Humane Society of Broward County. They founded Benny's Buddies, a charity that raises funds to pay for the adoption fees at the Humane Society. Bennett also volunteers with Brown Bagging for Calgary's Kids, a nonprofit that provides free lunches to schoolchildren.

== Career statistics ==
=== Regular season and playoffs ===
			Regular season					Playoffs
Season	Team	League	GP	G	A	Pts	PIM	GP	G	A	Pts	PIM
2012–13	Kingston Frontenacs	OHL	60	18	22	40	87	4	0	3	3	2
2013–14	Kingston Frontenacs	OHL	57	36	55	91	118	7	5	4	9	18
2014–15	Kingston Frontenacs	OHL	11	11	13	24	14	4	0	3	3	4
2014–15	Calgary Flames	NHL	1	0	1	1	0	11	3	1	4	8
2015–16	Calgary Flames	NHL	77	18	18	36	37	—	—	—	—	—
2016–17	Calgary Flames	NHL	81	13	13	26	75	4	2	0	2	4
2017–18	Calgary Flames	NHL	82	11	15	26	59	—	—	—	—	—
2018–19	Calgary Flames	NHL	71	13	14	27	93	5	1	4	5	16
2019–20	Calgary Flames	NHL	52	8	4	12	36	10	5	3	8	10
2020–21	Calgary Flames	NHL	38	4	8	12	19	—	—	—	—	—
2020–21	Florida Panthers	NHL	10	6	9	15	33	5	1	4	5	8
2021–22	Florida Panthers	NHL	71	28	21	49	74	10	1	2	3	12
2022–23	Florida Panthers	NHL	63	16	24	40	54	20	5	10	15	60
2023–24	Florida Panthers	NHL	69	20	21	41	100	19	7	7	14	12
2024–25	Florida Panthers	NHL	76	25	26	51	90	23	15	7	22	48
2025–26	Florida Panthers	NHL	76	26	32	58	82	—	—	—	—	—
NHL totals			767	188	206	394	752	107	40	38	78	178

=== International ===
Year	Team	Event	Result	GP	G	A	Pts	PIM
2013	Canada	U18	1st place, gold medalist(s)	7	3	4	7	4
2013	Canada	IH18	1st place, gold medalist(s)	5	3	1	4	6
2025	Canada	4NF	1st place, gold medalist(s)	3	1	0	1	5
2026	Canada	OG	2nd place, silver medalist(s)	5	0	1	1	6
Junior totals				12	6	5	11	10
Senior totals				8	1	1	2	11

== Awards and honours ==
Award	Year	Ref
OHL
OHL Second All-Rookie Team	2013	
OHL Third All-Star Team	2014	
NHL
Ralph T. Scurfield Humanitarian Award	2020	
Stanley Cup champion	2024, 2025	
Conn Smythe Trophy	2025	

Awards and achievements
Preceded by Morgan Klimchuk	Calgary Flames first-round draft pick 2014	Succeeded by Matthew Tkachuk
Preceded by Connor McDavid	Conn Smythe Trophy; 2025	Succeeded by Jordan Staal
