= Corey Potter =

American ice hockey player (born 1984)

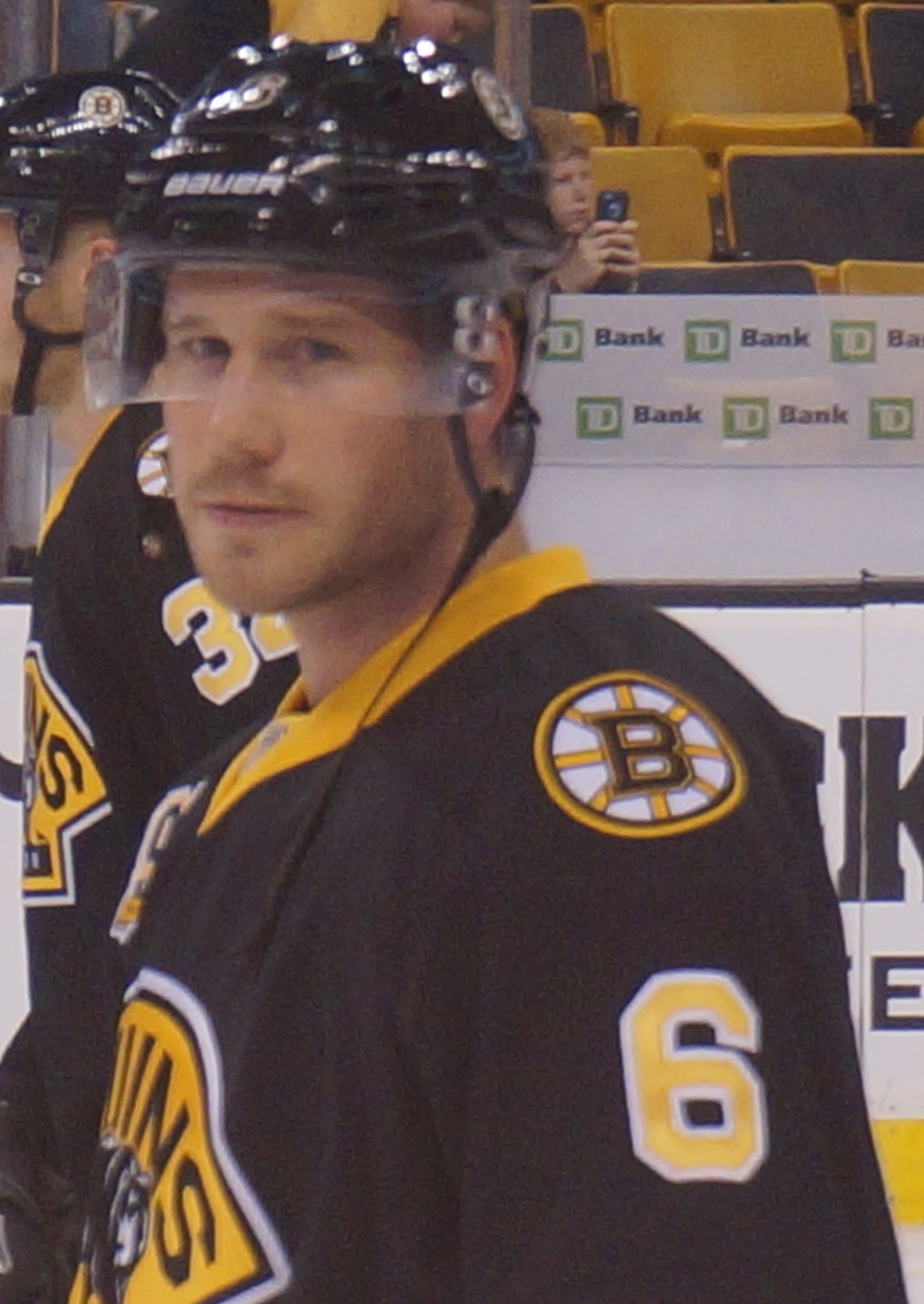
- Potter with the Boston Bruins in 2014
- Born: January 5, 1984 (age 42) Lansing, Michigan, U.S.
- Height: 6 ft 3 in (191 cm)
- Weight: 206 lb (93 kg; 14 st 10 lb)
- Position: Defense
- Shot: Right
- Played for: New York Rangers; Pittsburgh Penguins; Edmonton Oilers; Boston Bruins; Calgary Flames; Nashville Predators; Kölner Haie
- NHL draft: 122nd overall, 2003; New York Rangers
- Playing career: 2006–2019

Corey Michael Potter (born January 5, 1984) is an American former professional ice hockey defenseman. He most recently played for Kölner Haie of the Deutsche Eishockey Liga (DEL). Potter was born in Lansing, Michigan, but grew up in Mason, Michigan.

== Playing career ==
As a youth, Potter played in the 1998 Quebec International Pee-Wee Hockey Tournament with the Detroit Honeybaked minor ice hockey team.

Potter was drafted 122nd overall in the 2003 NHL entry draft by the New York Rangers. He played his first NHL game for the Rangers on December 7, 2008 against the Calgary Flames. He scored his first NHL point, an assist on a Dmitri Kalinin goal, on December 27, 2008 against the New Jersey Devils. He scored his first NHL goal on April 2, 2009 against the Carolina Hurricanes.

He was signed as a free agent by the Pittsburgh Penguins on July 16, 2010.

On July 1, 2011, Potter signed a one-year, two-way contract with the Edmonton Oilers. His signing was in part due to the urging of Oilers coach Tom Renney. After appearing in only one NHL game with the Penguins the previous year, he made the club out of training camp. He has played a large role, including being featured on the first unit power-play.

On January 9, 2012, Potter signed a two-year extension with the Oilers In his 62nd game after Potter was hit by Bobby Ryan of the Anaheim Ducks, he suffered a concussion, and missed the remainder of the regular season.

On October 2, 2012 he signed a temporary NHL lockout contract with the Vienna Capitals of the Austrian Hockey League. Potter appeared in 17 games for 4 points before returning to the Oilers for the shortened 2012–13 season.

On the eve of the 2013–14 trade deadline, on March 4, 2014 Potter was placed on waivers by the Oilers and later claimed by the Boston Bruins.

In the off-season, Potter agreed to a one-year, two way contract with the Calgary Flames for the 2014–15 season on September 5, 2014.

As a free agent, Potter accepted a professional try-out contract to attend the training camp of the Arizona Coyotes on September 9, 2015. The Coyotes signed Potter to a one-year, two-way deal on October 2. In the 2015–16 season, Potter was reassigned to the Springfield Falcons. As an alternate captain Potter appeared in 52 games with the Falcons for 17 points. On February 29, 2016, Potter was dealt at the trade deadline to the Nashville Predators for future considerations.

On May 27, 2016, Potter opted to embark on his second venture in Europe in agreeing to a one-year contract in Germany, with Kölner Haie of the Deutsche Eishockey Liga (DEL).

== Career statistics ==
=== Regular season and playoffs ===
			Regular season					Playoffs
Season	Team	League	GP	G	A	Pts	PIM	GP	G	A	Pts	PIM
2000–01	US NTDP Juniors	NAHL	53	4	4	8	20	—	—	—	—	—
2000–01	US NTDP U17	USDP	13	0	0	0	6	—	—	—	—	—
2001–02	US NTDP Juniors	USHL	13	2	2	4	12	—	—	—	—	—
2001–02	US NTDP Juniors	NAHL	10	0	3	3	4	—	—	—	—	—
2002–03	Michigan State University	CCHA	35	4	4	8	30	—	—	—	—	—
2003–04	Michigan State University	CCHA	38	0	8	8	63	—	—	—	—	—
2004–05	Michigan State University	CCHA	32	0	6	6	73	—	—	—	—	—
2005–06	Michigan State University	CCHA	45	4	18	22	117	—	—	—	—	—
2006–07	Charlotte Checkers	ECHL	43	6	13	19	56	—	—	—	—	—
2006–07	Hartford Wolf Pack	AHL	30	2	8	10	21	7	1	4	5	12
2007–08	Hartford Wolf Pack	AHL	80	5	27	32	102	5	0	1	1	14
2008–09	Hartford Wolf Pack	AHL	67	10	22	32	82	6	1	3	4	23
2008–09	New York Rangers	NHL	5	1	1	2	0	—	—	—	—	—
2009–10	Hartford Wolf Pack	AHL	69	4	24	28	54	—	—	—	—	—
2009–10	New York Rangers	NHL	3	0	0	0	2	—	—	—	—	—
2010–11	Wilkes–Barre/Scranton Penguins	AHL	75	7	30	37	52	12	2	7	9	10
2010–11	Pittsburgh Penguins	NHL	1	0	0	0	0	—	—	—	—	—
2011–12	Edmonton Oilers	NHL	62	4	17	21	24	—	—	—	—	—
2012–13	Vienna Capitals	EBEL	17	1	3	4	10	—	—	—	—	—
2012–13	Edmonton Oilers	NHL	33	3	1	4	6	—	—	—	—	—
2013–14	Edmonton Oilers	NHL	16	0	5	5	21	—	—	—	—	—
2013–14	Oklahoma City Barons	AHL	6	0	1	1	4	—	—	—	—	—
2013–14	Boston Bruins	NHL	3	0	0	0	0	1	0	0	0	0
2014–15	Adirondack Flames	AHL	25	0	10	10	18	—	—	—	—	—
2014–15	Calgary Flames	NHL	6	0	0	0	0	2	0	0	0	0
2015–16	Springfield Falcons	AHL	52	5	12	17	32	—	—	—	—	—
2015–16	Milwaukee Admirals	AHL	18	0	3	3	12	3	0	1	1	4
2015–16	Nashville Predators	NHL	1	0	0	0	0	—	—	—	—	—
2016–17	Kölner Haie	DEL	49	3	15	18	87	6	0	1	1	0
2017–18	Kölner Haie	DEL	37	2	8	10	28	6	0	0	0	2
2018–19	Kölner Haie	DEL	43	1	5	6	48	—	—	—	—	—
AHL totals			422	33	137	170	377	33	4	16	20	63
NHL totals			130	8	24	32	53	3	0	0	0	0
DEL totals			129	6	28	34	163	12	0	1	1	2

Medal record

Representing United States

Ice hockey

World Junior Championships
Gold medal – first place	2004 Helsinki	

IIHF U18 Championships
Gold medal – first place	2002 Piešťany	

=== International ===
Year	Team	Event	Result	GP	G	A	Pts	PIM
2001	United States	U17	1st place, gold medalist(s)	6	0	0	0	2
2002	United States	WJC18	1st place, gold medalist(s)	8	0	2	2	29
2004	United States	WJC	1st place, gold medalist(s)	6	0	0	0	6
Junior totals				20	0	2	2	37
