= Luke Gazdic =

Canadian ice hockey player (born 1989)

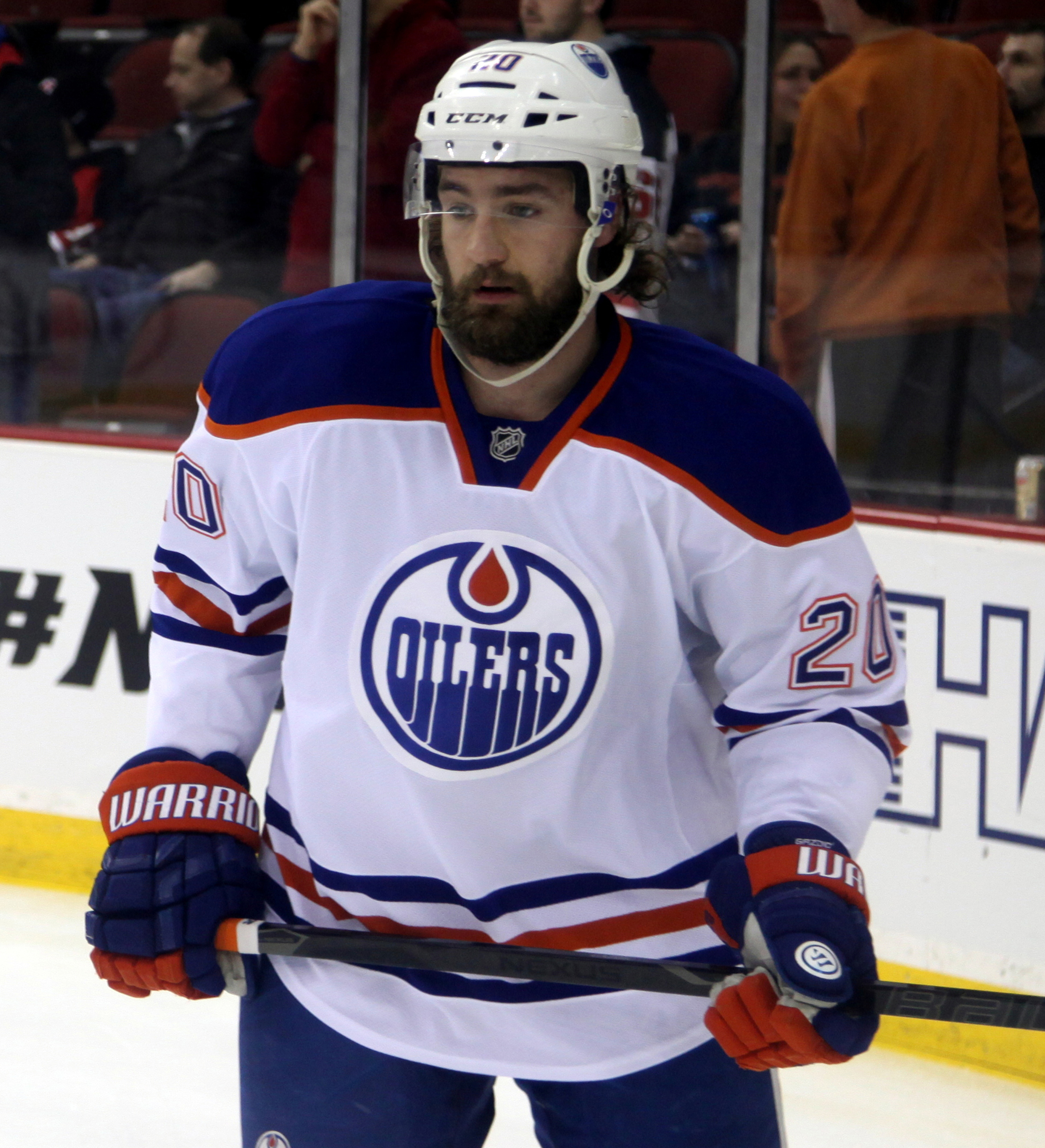
- Gazdic in February 2014
- Born: July 25, 1989 (age 37) Toronto, Ontario, Canada
- Height: 6 ft 4 in (193 cm)
- Weight: 225 lb (102 kg; 16 st 1 lb)
- Position: Left wing
- Shot: Left
- Played for: Edmonton Oilers; New Jersey Devils
- NHL draft: 172nd overall, 2007; Dallas Stars
- Playing career: 2009–2020

Luke Gazdic (born July 25, 1989) is a Canadian former professional ice hockey winger. Gazdic was selected 172nd overall in the 2007 NHL entry draft by the Dallas Stars. He played for the Edmonton Oilers and New Jersey Devils during his National Hockey League (NHL) career. Gazdic mainly played as an enforcer. Since 2023, he has served as an analyst for NHL on Sportsnet.

== Playing career ==
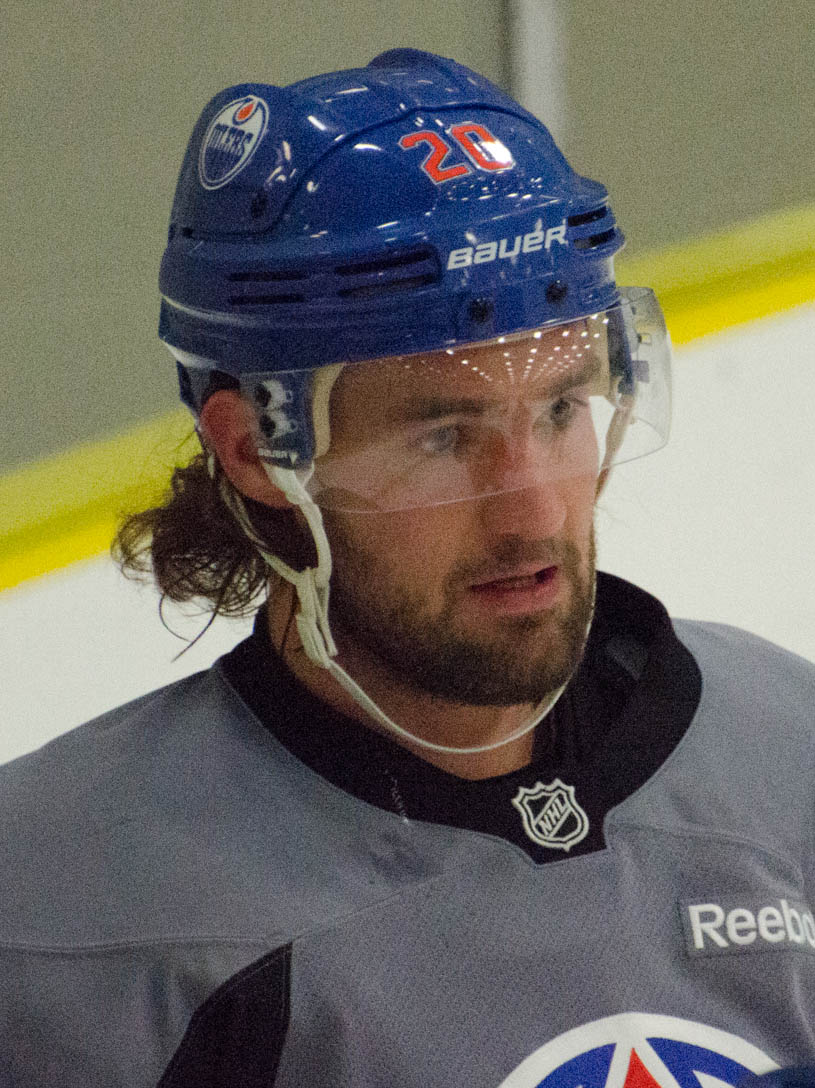
Gazdic in 2014

After being drafted by Dallas and completing his OHL career, Gadzic mostly played for Dallas' affiliate AHL team, the Texas Stars, through 2012-13.

On September 29, 2013, Gazdic was claimed on waivers by the Edmonton Oilers from the Dallas Stars.

Gazdic made his NHL debut on opening night of the 2013–14 NHL season, October 1, 2013, and scored his first NHL goal at 2:21 of the first period past Winnipeg Jets goalie Ondrej Pavelec. In the process he recorded the first goal of the Oilers' season. Over parts of three seasons as an enforcer with the Oilers, he scored five goals and eight points in 136 games.

On July 5, 2016, having left the Oilers as a free agent, Gazdic agreed to a one-year, two-way deal with the New Jersey Devils. He appeared in 11 games throughout the 2016–17 season with the Devils.

On July 2, 2017, Gazdic returned to Canada as a free agent in signing a one-year, two-way deal with the Calgary Flames. Gazdic was reassigned to their AHL affiliate the Stockton Heat for the duration of the 2017–18 season. In 61 regular season games, he contributed 1 goal and 2 points while posting 59 penalty minutes.

As a free agent from the Flames, and with no NHL contract over the summer, Gazdic joined the San Diego Gulls training camp on a tryout and later made the AHL opening night roster for the 2018–19 season. He made 20 appearances with the Gulls posting 3 goals and 7 points. In the following off-season, Gazdic opted to continue his tenure with the Gulls, agreeing to a one-year contract on August 14, 2019. In June 2021, Gazdic announced his retirement.

== Personal life ==
His brothers Benjamin and Mark are also ice hockey players. His father, Mike Gazdic, was drafted in the 1978 NHL Amateur Draft by the Buffalo Sabres.

Gazdic set up his former Oilers teammate Connor McDavid on a blind date with his then-girlfriend's cousin, Lauren Kyle.

== Career statistics ==
			Regular season					Playoffs
Season	Team	League	GP	G	A	Pts	PIM	GP	G	A	Pts	PIM
2004–05	North York Rangers U16 AAA	GTHL	38	13	16	29	24	—	—	—	—	—
2004–05	North York Rangers	OPJHL	1	0	0	0	0	—	—	—	—	—
2005–06	Wexford Raiders	OPJHL	47	17	16	33	105	10	0	5	5	14
2006–07	Erie Otters	OHL	58	5	8	13	136	—	—	—	—	—
2007–08	Erie Otters	OHL	67	17	12	29	144	—	—	—	—	—
2008–09	Erie Otters	OHL	63	20	10	30	127	5	0	0	0	9
2008–09	Idaho Steelheads	ECHL	2	1	0	1	14	2	0	0	0	0
2009–10	Texas Stars	AHL	49	3	1	4	155	—	—	—	—	—
2009–10	Idaho Steelheads	ECHL	4	1	1	2	10	—	—	—	—	—
2010–11	Texas Stars	AHL	72	9	8	17	110	5	0	0	0	2
2011–12	Texas Stars	AHL	76	11	12	23	102	—	—	—	—	—
2012–13	Texas Stars	AHL	59	4	7	11	80	8	0	0	0	19
2013–14	Edmonton Oilers	NHL	67	2	2	4	127	—	—	—	—	—
2014–15	Edmonton Oilers	NHL	40	2	1	3	43	—	—	—	—	—
2014–15	Oklahoma City Barons	AHL	5	2	0	2	7	—	—	—	—	—
2015–16	Edmonton Oilers	NHL	29	1	0	1	24	—	—	—	—	—
2015–16	Bakersfield Condors	AHL	11	1	2	3	6	—	—	—	—	—
2016–17	Albany Devils	AHL	37	1	6	7	63	—	—	—	—	—
2016–17	New Jersey Devils	NHL	11	0	0	0	12	—	—	—	—	—
2017–18	Stockton Heat	AHL	61	1	1	2	59	—	—	—	—	—
2018–19	San Diego Gulls	AHL	20	3	4	7	39	1	0	0	0	2
2019–20	San Diego Gulls	AHL	7	0	0	0	2	—	—	—	—	—
AHL totals			397	35	41	76	623	14	0	0	0	23
NHL totals			147	5	3	8	206	—	—	—	—	—
