= Matt Stajan =

Canadian ice hockey player (born 1983)

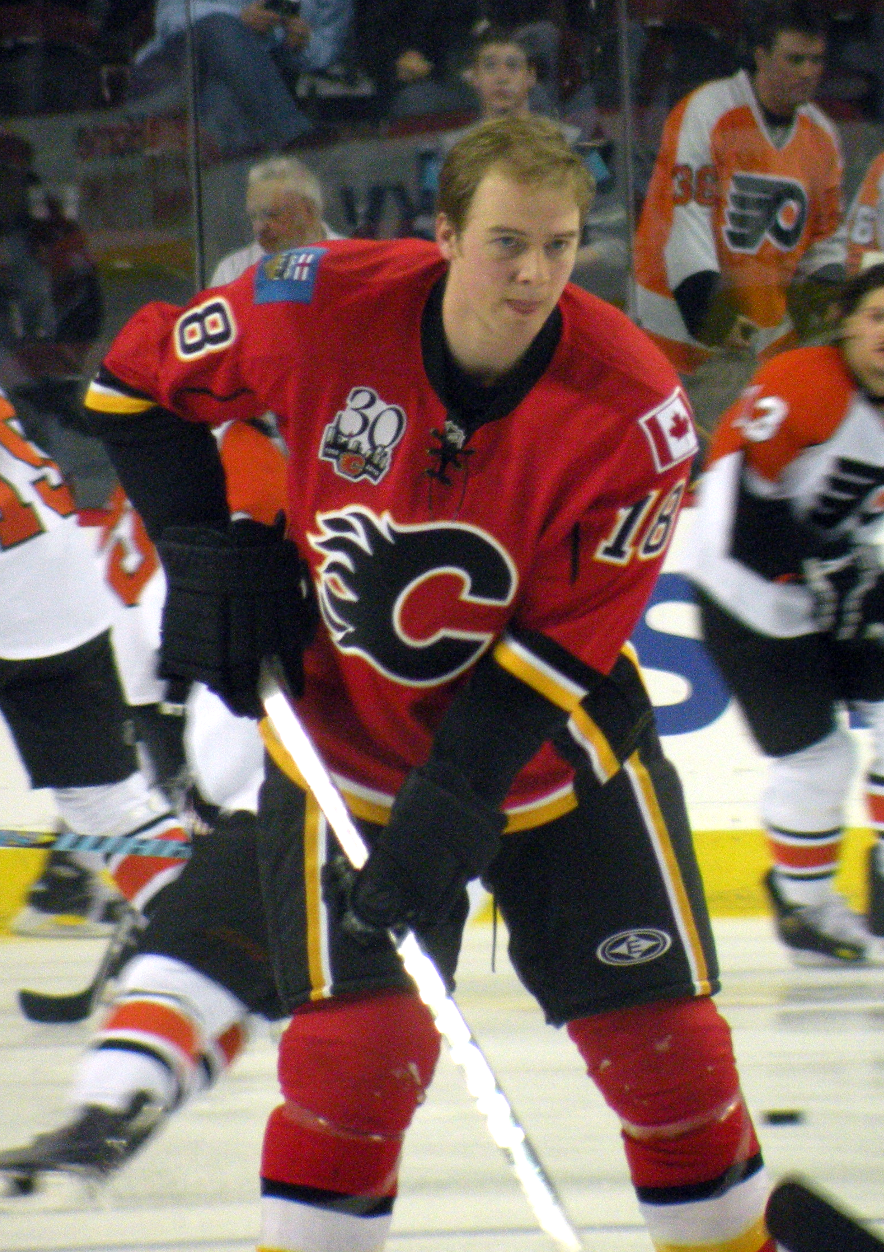
- Stajan with the Calgary Flames in 2010
- Born: December 19, 1983 (age 42) Mississauga, Ontario, Canada
- Height: 6 ft 1 in (185 cm)
- Weight: 192 lb (87 kg; 13 st 10 lb)
- Position: Centre
- Shot: Left
- Played for: Toronto Maple Leafs; Calgary Flames; EHC München
- NHL draft: 57th overall, 2002; Toronto Maple Leafs
- Playing career: 2003–2019

Matthew Stajan (/steɪˈdʒæn/ stay-JAN; born December 19, 1983) is a Canadian former professional ice hockey centre. He was a second round selection, 57th overall, of the Toronto Maple Leafs at the 2002 NHL entry draft. Stajan made his NHL debut in 2003 and was a member of the Maple Leafs until he was traded to the Calgary Flames in 2010. Stajan played his final professional season with EHC Red Bull München of the Deutsche Eishockey Liga (DEL)

Internationally, Stajan was a member of the Canadian national junior team that won a silver medal at the 2003 World Junior Hockey Championships.

== Playing career ==
=== Junior ===
A native of Mississauga, Ontario, Stajan played his minor hockey in the Greater Toronto Hockey League with the Toronto Red Wings and Mississauga Senators associations before being drafted by the Belleville Bulls in the Ontario Hockey League (OHL) Priority Selection draft in 2000. He played three seasons in the OHL between 2000 and 2003 in which he scored 206 points in 182 games. Stajan made his debut in 2000–01 season with a 27-point season in 57 games, then improved to 33 goals and 85 points the following season. He also finished with a plus-minus rating of +36 and was a finalist in an OHL coaches poll naming the best defensive forward. Stajan was also a member of the OHL's Eastern Conference All-Star Team in the Canadian Hockey League's All-Star series.

The Toronto Maple Leafs selected Stajan with their second-round pick, 57th overall, at the 2002 NHL entry draft. He described being chosen by his hometown team as a "dream come true". He returned to Belleville for his final OHL season in 2002–03 where he finished 8th in league scoring with 94 points. He played his second all-star game for the Eastern Conference, and was named to the OHL's third All-Star Team following the season. Stajan was also a member of the Canadian national junior team at the 2003 World Junior Hockey Championships. He scored a goal and an assist in six games to help Canada win the silver medal.

=== Toronto Maple Leafs ===
Stajan was assigned to the American Hockey League (AHL)'s St. John's Maple Leafs at the conclusion of Belleville's season. He made his professional debut on April 4, 2003, and registered an assist against the Manitoba Moose. He was recalled to Toronto and made his NHL debut the following night against the Ottawa Senators. He scored his first goal that night on goaltender Martin Prusek in a 3–1 loss. Stajan earned a spot on the Toronto roster in 2003–04; he appeared in 69 games in his rookie season, scored 14 goals and recorded 27 points. He appeared in three playoff games. Stajan also participated in the YoungStars Game at the 2004 All-Star Game, where he scored a goal and an assist for the Eastern Conference in a 7–3 loss to the West.

While the 2004-05 season was delayed, and ultimately cancelled, due to a labour dispute, Stajan was assigned to St. John's. He recorded 66 points in 80 games and scored 23 goals. Stajan returned to Toronto when NHL play resumed in 2005–06 where he focused on developing his two-way play, trying to become both an offensive presence while remaining defensively responsible. He finished with 27 points, and led the league with eight short-handed points (tied with Marián Hossa).

The Maple Leafs and Stajan agreed to a new two-year, $1.75 million contract prior to the 2006–07 season. His offensive production improved modestly; he scored 39 points that season and followed it with 33 in 2007–08. His performances earned him another two-year contract, worth $3.5 million.

With 55 points in 76 games, Stajan finished third in Maple Leafs' scoring in 2008–09; his 40 assists led the team. He was again among Toronto's leading scorers, with 41 points in 55 games, when he was included in a blockbuster trade: On January 31, 2010, Stajan was sent to the Calgary Flames, along with Niklas Hagman, Ian White and Jamal Mayers in exchange for Dion Phaneuf, Fredrik Sjöström and Keith Aulie. He finished the year with 16 points in 27 games with Calgary, resulting in a combined total and career high of 57 points.

=== Calgary Flames ===
Though he was set to become an unrestricted free agent following the season, Stajan opted to remain in Calgary and signed a four-year, $14 million contract with the Flames. Stajan's offensive production rapidly declined over the following two seasons – he scored 31 points in 2010–11 and only 18 in 2011–12 – which resulted increasing condemnation of his play and arguments that his contract had become one of the "worst in franchise history" while head coach Brent Sutter dropped him from the top scoring lines to the fourth line in a checking role. His troubled 2011–12 season was exacerbated by a sprained ankle, an injury that caused him to miss 14 games. However, he finished the season on an offensive high that included scoring his 100th career goal late in the year.

When the Flames replaced Sutter with Bob Hartley in the 2012–13, the new head coach expanded Stajan's role. He responded with what he called his best season, scoring 23 points in 43 games in the lockout-shortened season while earning praise for his defensive responsibility; Stajan's plus-minus rating of +7 led the team and he was one of only two players with a positive total. Following the departure of several of Calgary's top players and with the team entering a rebuilding period, Stajan was expected to centre Calgary's top line in 2013–14. However, he suffered a leg contusion in the team's season opening game that caused him to miss several weeks of play. Stajan appeared in only 63 games for the Flames, but recorded 33 points, his highest total in four years. Injury again sidelined Stajan early in the 2014–15 season. He suffered a knee injury as a result of a knee-on-knee collision with Montreal's Jarred Tinordi that was expected to keep him out of the Flames' lineup for six weeks.

The Flames made the playoffs for the first time since 2008–09 in 2014–15, and Stajan played every game of the postseason, forming one of the Flames' most dangerous forward lines with wingers David Jones and Micheal Ferland. Jones and Ferland were the offensive and physical leaders on the line during the Flames' run to the second round of the playoffs, but it was Stajan who scored the series-clinching goal in Game 6 of the Flames' first-round playoff series against the Vancouver Canucks. The Anaheim Ducks would defeat Calgary in five games in the semifinals, ending the Flames' season. Stajan finished the playoffs with 1 goal and 4 points in 11 games.

With the emergence of rookie Sam Bennett, Stajan centred the Flames' fourth line throughout the following season, 2015–16, and saw his offensive production decrease accordingly. Stajan went from 17 points in 59 games in 2014–15 to 17 points in 80 games in 2015–16. Coach Bob Hartley was fired in the offseason following a disastrous 2015-16 campaign, and was replaced with former Canucks assistant Glen Gulutzan, who quickly re-established Stajan's third-line position, this time with Kris Versteeg and Troy Brouwer.

During the 2017–18 season Stajan played in his 1,000th NHL game in a 4–0 loss to the Anaheim Ducks.

=== EHC Munchen ===
On August 29, 2018, after fifteen seasons in the NHL, Stajan signed with EHC Red Bull München of the Deutsche Eishockey Liga (DEL).

Stajan announced his retirement from hockey on May 2, 2019. On December 3, 2019, he announced his retirement again, this time through the NHLPA.

== Post-retirement career ==
Ahead of the 2024–25 NHL season, it was announced that Stajan had been hired as a skills consultant for the Calgary Flames. The role involves helping both Flames and Calgary Wranglers players with their individual development.

== Personal life ==
Matt is the son of Mike and Nada Stajan, and he has an elder sister, Michelle. He and his wife Katie have lived in Calgary since his trade from Toronto. Their first child died shortly after birth in March 2014. The couple had their second son, one year later and a third son born in August 2018. Stajan is of Slovenian descent; both of his sets of grandparents immigrated to Canada in the 1950s. His paternal grandfather, Ludvic, started a company that manufactures fire doors that Mike and an uncle took over. Stajan wore uniform number 14 throughout his youth career and with the Maple Leafs in honour of his uncle Robert, who wore the number in his own hockey career and died of cancer when Stajan was a young boy. Stajan changed his number to 18 upon joining the Flames, as 14 was taken out of circulation following Theoren Fleury's departure from the team.

Stajan has been recognized several times for his charitable contributions. He was the Toronto Maple Leafs' nominee for the King Clancy Memorial Trophy in 2007, which recognizes players who exhibit leadership qualities while making a significant contribution to their community. In Calgary, Stajan has been a spokesman for the Alberta Children's Hospital and supports the Ronald McDonald House. In 2013, the Flames named him the winner of the Ralph T. Scurfield Humanitarian Award for perseverance, dedication and leadership, and nominated him for the NHL Foundation Player Award. Following the death of his first child, Stajan and his wife Katie hosted an event called "A Night Under the Stars", which raised over $100,000 for the neonatal intensive care unit at Calgary's Foothills Medical Centre. Additionally, Stajan is active within the National Hockey League Players' Association; he has served as his team's player representative in both Toronto and Calgary.

== Career statistics ==
=== Regular season and playoffs ===
			Regular season					Playoffs
Season	Team	League	GP	G	A	Pts	PIM	GP	G	A	Pts	PIM
1999–2000	Mississauga Senators AAA	Midget	34	18	26	44	26	—	—	—	—	—
2000–01	Belleville Bulls	OHL	57	9	18	27	27	7	1	6	7	5
2001–02	Belleville Bulls	OHL	68	33	52	85	50	11	3	8	11	14
2002–03	Belleville Bulls	OHL	57	34	60	94	75	7	5	8	13	16
2002–03	Toronto Maple Leafs	NHL	1	1	0	1	0	—	—	—	—	—
2002–03	St. John's Maple Leafs	AHL	1	0	1	1	0	—	—	—	—	—
2003–04	Toronto Maple Leafs	NHL	69	14	13	27	22	3	0	0	0	2
2004–05	St. John's Maple Leafs	AHL	80	23	43	66	43	5	2	2	4	6
2005–06	Toronto Maple Leafs	NHL	80	15	12	27	50	—	—	—	—	—
2006–07	Toronto Maple Leafs	NHL	82	10	29	39	44	—	—	—	—	—
2007–08	Toronto Maple Leafs	NHL	82	16	17	33	47	—	—	—	—	—
2008–09	Toronto Maple Leafs	NHL	76	15	40	55	54	—	—	—	—	—
2009–10	Toronto Maple Leafs	NHL	55	16	25	41	30	—	—	—	—	—
2009–10	Calgary Flames	NHL	27	3	13	16	2	—	—	—	—	—
2010–11	Calgary Flames	NHL	76	6	25	31	32	—	—	—	—	—
2011–12	Calgary Flames	NHL	61	8	10	18	29	—	—	—	—	—
2012–13	Calgary Flames	NHL	43	5	18	23	26	—	—	—	—	—
2013–14	Calgary Flames	NHL	63	14	19	33	42	—	—	—	—	—
2014–15	Calgary Flames	NHL	59	7	10	17	28	11	1	3	4	21
2015–16	Calgary Flames	NHL	80	6	11	17	52	—	—	—	—	—
2016–17	Calgary Flames	NHL	81	6	17	23	40	3	0	0	0	0
2017–18	Calgary Flames	NHL	68	4	8	12	28	—	—	—	—	—
2018–19	EHC München	DEL	52	13	20	33	24	15	1	5	6	22
NHL totals			1,003	146	267	413	526	17	1	3	4	23

=== International ===
Medal record

Representing Canada

Men's ice hockey

World Junior Championship
Silver medal – second place	2003 Canada	

Year	Team	Event	GP	G	A	Pts	PIM
2003	Canada	WJC	6	1	1	2	0
Junior totals			6	1	1	2	0

== Awards and honours ==
Award	Year
OHL
Third-Team All-Star	2002–03
NHL
Played in YoungStars Game	2003–04
Ralph T. Scurfield Humanitarian Award; Cgy – Perseverance, dedication and leadership	2012–13
J. R. "Bud" McCaig Award; Cgy – Courtesy and respect	2013–14
