= Micheal Ferland =

Canadian ice hockey player (born 1992)

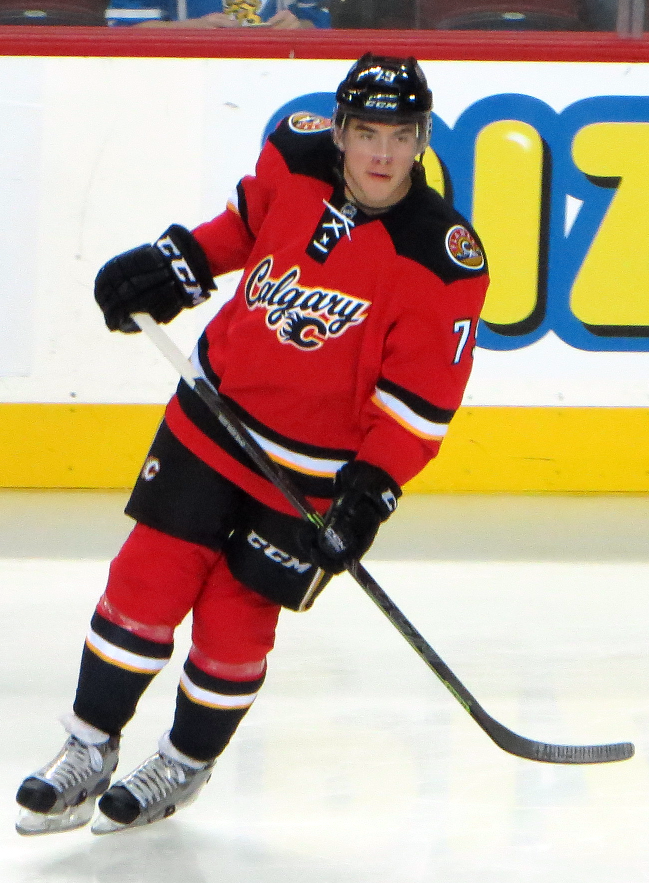
- Ferland with the Calgary Flames in 2014
- Born: April 20, 1992 (age 34) Swan River, Manitoba, Canada
- Height: 6 ft 1 in (185 cm)
- Weight: 217 lb (98 kg; 15 st 7 lb)
- Position: Winger
- Shot: Left
- Played for: Calgary Flames; Carolina Hurricanes; Vancouver Canucks
- NHL draft: 133rd overall, 2010; Calgary Flames
- Playing career: 2012–2020

Micheal Ferland (born April 20, 1992) is a Canadian former professional ice hockey winger . Ferland has previously played for the Vancouver Canucks, Calgary Flames, and Carolina Hurricanes. Ferland was drafted by the Flames in the fifth round, 133rd overall, at the 2010 NHL entry draft.

== Early life ==
Ferland was born on April 20, 1992, in Swan River, Manitoba. He is the middle of three children, with an older sister and a younger brother, raised by his mother Dianne, who worked as a dietary aide at a nursing home in Swan River. Ferland played house league hockey from ages 8 to 15 before earning the attention of the midget AAA Brandon Wheat Kings; he was given a try-out and earned a place with the team. Dianne struggled to fund her son's hockey dream; she required support from charities such as KidSport and the Manitoba Métis Federation to help pay for his equipment. Dianne also credited her eldest daughter, Samantha, who was never able to play competitive sports herself as the family was unable to support more than one child in the sport. When Micheal made the midget Wheat Kings team, the parents of his Swan River teammates helped pay his enrollment fees.

== Playing career ==
=== Junior ===
At age 17, Ferland joined the major junior Brandon Wheat Kings of the Western Hockey League (WHL). He scored 9 goals and 28 points in 61 games during the 2009–10 regular season. He also appeared in 15 playoff games for Brandon, and played an additional five in the 2010 Memorial Cup. The Calgary Flames selected him with their fifth round pick, 133rd overall, at the 2010 NHL entry draft. Ferland remained with Brandon for the following two seasons where he recorded 56 points in 2010–11 then finished ninth in WHL scoring with 96 points in 2011–12.

Ferland began his professional career in 2012–13. The Flames assigned him to their American Hockey League (AHL) affiliate, the Abbotsford Heat, to begin the season, but he arrived to training camp in poor condition and struggled with Abbotsford. After seven games, he was demoted to the ECHL's Utah Grizzlies for just three more games before the Flames returned him to the Brandon Wheat Kings. His stay with the Wheat Kings was similarly short as Brandon traded Ferland to the Saskatoon Blades; as he struggled, the 20-year-old Ferland became discouraged and considered quitting hockey entirely. He persevered and played a pivotal role with the Blades as they won 18 consecutive games and appeared in the 2013 Memorial Cup as the host team.

=== Professional ===
==== Calgary Flames ====
The Flames worked with Ferland throughout as they attempted to guide his career forward. During the 2012–13 season, head coach Bob Hartley connected Ferland with former NHL and fellow aboriginal player Gino Odjick to help his transition to professional hockey. Ferland returned to Abbotsford for the 2013–14 season 24 pounds lighter than the 234 pounds he weighed the previous season. He recorded 18 points in 25 games for the Heat before suffering a knee injury on December 12, 2013, that ended his season. Ferland had been considered a candidate to be recalled to Calgary prior to suffering his knee injury; the team had intended to recall him to the Flames as a reward for his work in Abbotsford at the time he was hurt.

Returning to good health in time for training camp prior to the 2014–15 season, Ferland continued to impress the Flames' coaches with both his scoring ability and physical play. He did not make the roster out of camp; he was assigned to the Adirondack Flames (the Flames' new AHL affiliate) to start the season. He led Adirondack with four goals and five assists in nine games when an injury to Mikael Backlund led the Flames to recall Ferland to Calgary on October 30, 2014. He made his NHL debut the following night in a 4–3 victory over the Nashville Predators, but was himself injured and missed the following eight games after being hit with an elbow to the head by Anton Volchenkov. Volchenkov received a four-game suspension for the hit. Ferland recorded his first NHL point on November 22, 2014, an assist on a goal by Josh Jooris in a 5–4 victory over the New Jersey Devils. Ferland played ten games with Calgary before returning to Adirondack. On his second recall to Calgary, Ferland scored his first NHL goal, against goaltender Carter Hutton of the Nashville Predators. It was the game-winning marker in a 5–2 victory on March 29, 2015.

Ferland finished his first NHL season with 2 goals and 5 points in 26 games. In Calgary's first round playoff series against the Vancouver Canucks, Ferland's physical play quickly made him a fan favourite in Calgary. His battles with Canucks defenceman Kevin Bieksa became a focal point of the series. Bieksa attempted to trivialize Ferland's impact by calling him "irrelevant". However, Ferland had a significant impact on the sixth and deciding game of the series, in Calgary. After the Canucks stormed out to a 3–0 lead less than ten minutes into the game, Ferland started a Flames comeback by converting a pass from Matt Stajan late in the period and then ended the scoring with an empty net goal in a 7–4 victory that eliminated Vancouver from the playoffs. His performance with the Flames earned Ferland a two-year, $1.65 million contract extension.

==== Carolina Hurricanes ====
On June 23, 2018, Ferland (along with Dougie Hamilton and prospect Adam Fox) was traded to the Carolina Hurricanes in exchange for Elias Lindholm and Noah Hanifin. In the 2018–19 season, Ferland adapted quickly with the Hurricanes, posting a career-high in assists with 23 while his 17 goals and 40 points were his second highest career total in both categories. Helping the Hurricanes return to the playoffs for the first time in 10 years, Ferland would be ejected from Game 2 of his team's opening round series against the Washington Capitals after a hit to the head of Capitals forward Nic Dowd. Both Ferland and head coach Rod Brind’Amour maintained they thought the hit was clean.

Ferland was hampered through injury in the playoffs, contributing one assist in seven games.

==== Vancouver Canucks ====
As a free agent from the Hurricanes, Ferland returned to Western Canada after agreeing to a four-year, $14 million contract with the Vancouver Canucks on July 10, 2019. Ferland's first season with Vancouver was plagued with concussion problems, resulting in him playing only 14 games. On three separate instances during the season, Ferland was forced to leave a game due to recurring symptoms. After missing the entirety of the 2020–21 season due to lingering concussion issues, Ferland stated, "No I don't think I'll play professionally ever again."

Ferland became an unrestricted free agent after his contract with Canucks expired at the end of the 2022–23 season. He has not signed with any team since and is presumed to have retired from professional hockey, though he has yet to make a formal announcement, despite his previous comments on the subject.

== Coaching career ==
On July 16, 2024, the Kenora Devils Cap Islanders announced that they hired Ferland as a skills coach for the 2024/2025 season. Before joining the Kenora Devils Cap Islanders, Ferland served as assistant coach for the Brandon Wheat Kings U18 AAA. He was also the head coach for Team Manitoba when they won the national title at the 2023 National Aboriginal Hockey Championships.

== Personal life ==
Ferland is Cree.

In the off-season prior to the 2012–13 season, Ferland was charged with assault and aggravated assault following a bar fight in Cochrane, Alberta. He played the following two seasons under the spectre of the assault charge before going to trial over the summer of 2014. Ferland was acquitted of the charges by a jury which found that he had acted in self-defence.

In addition to his legal and professional struggles, Ferland also struggled with alcoholism. He ultimately turned for help to Flames' head coach Bob Hartley and to teammate Brian McGrattan, who himself overcame a drinking problem. Ferland was also supported by Flames' minor league coach Mike Thompson, and celebrated one year of sobriety on March 27, 2015, two days before scoring his first NHL goal. Upon Ferland's one-year milestone, Hartley expressed his pride and support of Ferland for opening up and seeking treatment after he had noticed the player was struggling.

== Career statistics ==
			Regular season					Playoffs
Season	Team	League	GP	G	A	Pts	PIM	GP	G	A	Pts	PIM
2007–08	Brandon Wheat Kings AAA	MMHL	40	12	8	20	20	6	3	2	5	4
2008–09	Brandon Wheat Kings AAA	MMHL	44	45	40	85	52	6	4	5	9	8
2008–09	Beausejour Blades	MJHL	1	0	0	0	0	—	—	—	—	—
2009–10	Brandon Wheat Kings	WHL	61	9	19	28	85	15	3	1	4	8
2010–11	Brandon Wheat Kings	WHL	56	23	33	56	110	6	4	2	6	4
2011–12	Brandon Wheat Kings	WHL	69	47	49	96	84	8	3	3	6	6
2012–13	Abbotsford Heat	AHL	7	0	0	0	10	—	—	—	—	—
2012–13	Utah Grizzlies	ECHL	3	0	1	1	5	—	—	—	—	—
2012–13	Brandon Wheat Kings	WHL	4	1	1	2	4	—	—	—	—	—
2012–13	Saskatoon Blades	WHL	26	8	21	29	18	4	0	0	0	2
2013–14	Abbotsford Heat	AHL	25	6	12	18	31	—	—	—	—	—
2014–15	Adirondack Flames	AHL	32	7	8	15	30	—	—	—	—	—
2014–15	Calgary Flames	NHL	26	2	3	5	16	9	3	2	5	23
2015–16	Calgary Flames	NHL	71	4	14	18	45	—	—	—	—	—
2016–17	Calgary Flames	NHL	76	15	10	25	50	4	0	0	0	7
2017–18	Calgary Flames	NHL	77	21	20	41	24	—	—	—	—	—
2018–19	Carolina Hurricanes	NHL	71	17	23	40	58	7	0	1	1	18
2019–20	Vancouver Canucks	NHL	14	1	4	5	7	2	0	0	0	7
2019–20	Utica Comets	AHL	1	0	0	0	0	—	—	—	—	—
NHL totals			335	60	74	134	200	22	3	3	6	55
