= Gary Roberts (ice hockey) =

Canadian ice hockey player (born 1966)

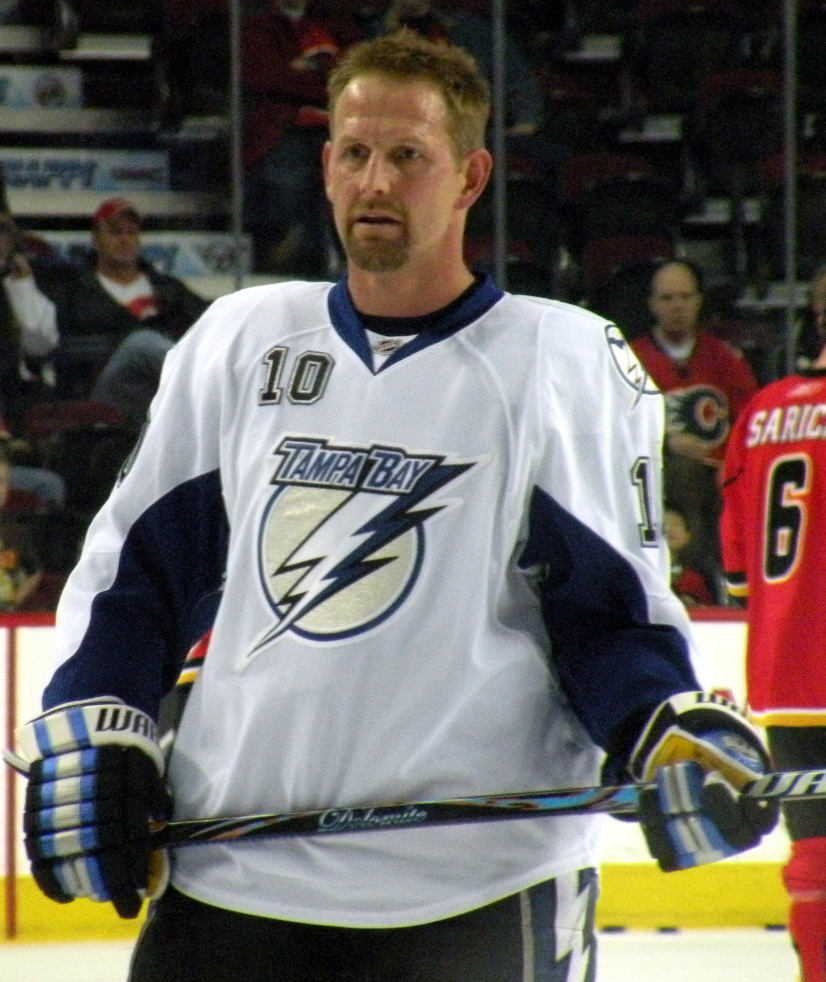
- Roberts with the Tampa Bay Lightning in 2009
- Born: May 23, 1966 (age 60) North York, Ontario, Canada
- Height: 6 ft 2 in (188 cm)
- Weight: 215 lb (98 kg; 15 st 5 lb)
- Position: Left wing
- Shot: Left
- Played for: Calgary Flames; Carolina Hurricanes; Toronto Maple Leafs; Florida Panthers; Pittsburgh Penguins; Tampa Bay Lightning
- NHL draft: 12th overall, 1984; Calgary Flames
- Playing career: 1986–2009

Gary R. Roberts (born May 23, 1966) is a Canadian former professional ice hockey player who played 21 seasons in the National Hockey League (NHL) for the Calgary Flames, Carolina Hurricanes, Toronto Maple Leafs, Florida Panthers, Pittsburgh Penguins, and Tampa Bay Lightning. Renowned for his physical fitness during his career, Roberts has become a high performance trainer for players at all levels of the sport.

Roberts was a member of Memorial Cup and Minto Cup winning teams as Canadian junior hockey and box lacrosse champions, respectively. He was a first round selection of the Calgary Flames, 12th overall, at the 1984 NHL entry draft and played ten seasons in Calgary. Roberts was a member of the Flames' 1989 Stanley Cup championship team and made two of his three NHL All-Star Game appearances as a representative of the team. A serious neck injury forced him to miss the majority of two seasons, and while his return earned him the 1996 Bill Masterton Memorial Trophy for perseverance and dedication to the game, he was forced into retirement following the 1995–96 season.

After sitting out a full season, Roberts successfully returned to the NHL in 1997 as a member of the Carolina Hurricanes, with whom he played three seasons. Stints in Toronto, Florida and Pittsburgh followed, and Roberts ended his career in 2009 as a member of the Tampa Bay Lightning. He played 11 seasons following his comeback, finishing with 1,224 games played, 438 goals, and 910 points.

== Early life ==
Roberts was born on May 23, 1966, in Toronto, Ontario, but grew up in Whitby. His best friend growing up was future NHL teammate Joe Nieuwendyk; the pair played minor hockey together in the winter, and box lacrosse in the summer. Roberts played Junior A lacrosse with the Whitby Warriors in the mid-1980s, with whom he won a Minto Cup, the Canadian junior championship.^{[a]}

== Playing career ==
=== Junior ===
In junior hockey, Roberts was drafted into the Ontario Hockey League (OHL). He joined the Ottawa 67's in 1982–83 and scored 20 points in 53 games. Roberts improved to 57 points in his second season and added 17 points in 13 playoff games. The 67's reached the OHL final and defeated the Kitchener Rangers to win the J. Ross Robertson Cup. The victory advanced the 67's to the 1984 Memorial Cup tournament where Ottawa reached the final. They again faced Kitchener, who were the tournament hosts, and won the national championship with a 7–2 victory. Following the season, the Calgary Flames selected Roberts with their first round selection, 12th overall, at the 1984 NHL entry draft.

Returned by the Flames to Ottawa for his third junior season in 1984–85, Roberts served as the team's captain. He recorded 106 points, including 44 goals, and was named to the OHL's second All-Star Team. Entering a rebuilding phase, the 67's were quickly eliminated from the playoffs, after which the Flames assigned Roberts to their American Hockey League (AHL) affiliate, the Moncton Golden Flames. In his first professional stint, Roberts scored four goals and added two assists in seven games. Roberts returned to Ottawa for a final junior season in 1985–86, a season in which he played with the Canadian junior team at the 1986 World Junior Ice Hockey Championships. Roberts finished second on the team with six goals for the silver medal-winning Canadians. In the OHL, he split the season between the last place 67's and, following a trade, the Guelph Platers. Roberts finished with 84 points combined between the two teams, and helped the Platers record a 15–3–2 record in the playoffs and lead Guelph past the Belleville Bulls to win the OHL championship. He scored four goals in four games at the 1986 Memorial Cup, and the Platers defeated the Hull Olympiques, 6–2 in the final. Roberts ended his junior career as a two-time Memorial Cup champion.

=== Calgary Flames ===
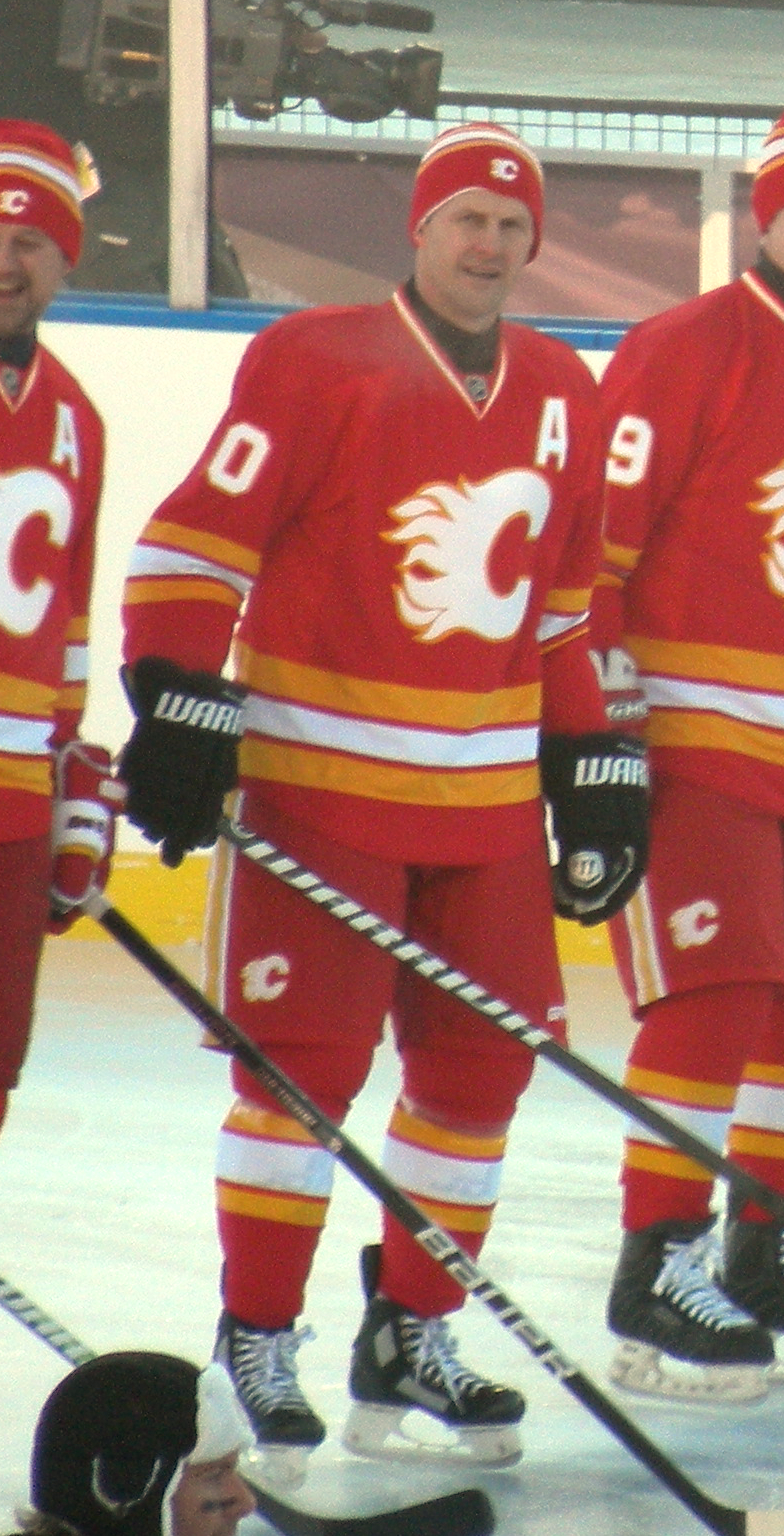
Roberts played with the Flames' alumni team at the 2011 Heritage Classic.

In his first professional season, 1986–87, Roberts shuttled between Calgary and Moncton. He was recalled to the Flames three times during the season and scored his first NHL goal in his NHL debut on November 11, 1986, against the Vancouver Canucks. He recorded 15 points in 32 games with Calgary and added 38 points in 38 AHL games with Moncton. In his first full season in Calgary, 1987–88, Roberts improved to 28 points in 74 NHL games, while his 282 penalty minutes were ultimately the highest total of his career, and the first of five consecutive seasons which he recorded over 200 minutes in penalties. Roberts joined the Flames as a grinder; He played a physical style and frequently engaged opponents in fights, but credited Nieuwendyk with helping him establish his place as a power forward and offensive threat with the team. Playing on a line with Nieuwendyk and Håkan Loob, Roberts scored 22 goals in 1988–89. He added 12 points in the 1989 Stanley Cup Playoffs, including two goals in the Flames' 5–3 victory in the fourth game of the Smythe Division final that eliminated the Los Angeles Kings. Roberts and the Flames went on to defeat the Montreal Canadiens in the 1989 Stanley Cup Final to earn the franchise's first Stanley Cup championship.

Developing into an offensive leader, Roberts scored more goals (39) in 1989–90 than he had points (38) the previous season. He scored his first career hat trick in a 6–2 win over the Edmonton Oilers on March 30, 1990. After regressing to 22 goals and 53 points in 1990–91, Roberts set career highs in 1991–92 with 53 goals and 90 points. Both totals led the Flames and 53 goals remains the second highest single-season total in Flames history, behind Lanny McDonald's 66 goals in 1982–83. He played in his first NHL All-Star Game in 1992, and became one of the first two players in NHL history to score 50 goals and record 200 penalty minutes in the same season (along with Kevin Stevens of the Pittsburgh Penguins).

Roberts tied a Flames franchise record with goals in eight consecutive games in 1992–93, a streak that came to an end when he suffered a quadriceps injury that caused him to miss 25 games. He finished the season with 79 points in 58 games, and appeared in his second All-Star Game. Healthy for most of the 1993–94 season, Roberts led the Flames with 41 goals. He missed the final two weeks due to damage to nerves in his neck, an injury he had experienced previously in his career. The injury worsened in the lockout-shortened 1994–95 season as he appeared in only eight games. Degeneration of the nerves in his neck left Roberts unable to lift a 2 pounds (0.91 kg) dumbbell above his shoulder with his left arm.

The injury was considered career threatening and required two surgeries, in March and October 1995, to repair. After missing the first half of the 1995–96 season, Roberts made his return on January 10, 1996, against the Hartford Whalers. The fans greeted him with a standing ovation and he responded by scoring a goal and throwing several bodychecks in the game. Although he played only 35 games, Roberts scored 22 goals and had 42 points. His return and performance earned him the Bill Masterton Memorial Trophy for perseverance and dedication to the game. The problems with his neck failed to abate however, and on June 17, 1996, Roberts elected to retire from the NHL at the age of 30.

=== Carolina and Toronto ===
Several months after retiring, Roberts was put in touch with Dr. Michael Leahy, a chiropractor from Colorado, whose "active release technique" of physiotherapy led to an immediate improvement in his mobility. Determined to try and resume his career, Roberts then spent most of the next year with a physical therapist learning a new training regimen. After sitting out the entire 1996–97 season, Roberts announced his return to the NHL. He remained a member of the Flames, but the team agreed to trade him to an Eastern team to reduce strain due to travel. The Flames dealt Roberts, along with goaltender Trevor Kidd, to the Carolina Hurricanes on August 25, 1997, in exchange for Andrew Cassels and Jean-Sébastien Giguère.

In his return season of 1997–98, Roberts recorded 49 points in 61 games. He dropped to 42 points in 1998–99, but finished fifth in team scoring to help Carolina win a Southeast Division championship. He scored his first playoff goal in five years in Carolina's first round series against the Boston Bruins, though the Hurricanes ultimately lost the series in six games. Roberts scored 53 points in 1999–2000 before leaving Carolina as a free agent.

Returning to Canada, Roberts signed a three-year, $8 million contract with the Toronto Maple Leafs. He chose his hometown Maple Leafs because he felt they had a better opportunity to win the Stanley Cup than Carolina did. He recorded 53 points in 2000–01 and his 29 goals led the team. A 48-point season followed in 2001–02 and he assumed leadership of the Maple Leafs during the 2002 Stanley Cup Playoffs after team captain Mats Sundin suffered an injury. Roberts led Toronto past their first round opponent, the New York Islanders, in an occasionally violent seven game series. Roberts contributed to this violence in game five, with a hit that drove Kenny Jonsson into the boards head-first, leading to a season-ending concussion for Jonsson. Roberts was assessed a major penalty, but, surprisingly, was not suspended. The Maple Leafs reached the Eastern Conference final, where they ultimately lost to Carolina. Roberts led Toronto in playoff scoring with 19 points in 19 games.

Playing a physical style again took its toll on Roberts' upper body, and he required surgery on both shoulders following the season. As a result, he missed the first four and a half months of the 2002–03 season; he appeared in only 14 games for Toronto. The Maple Leafs signed him to a one-year contract extension shortly after he returned from the injury. Roberts reached a career milestone midway through the 2003–04 season, as he played his 1,000th NHL game on January 13, 2004, a 4–1 victory over the Calgary Flames. He finished the season with 48 points in 72 games and played in his third All-Star Game.

=== Florida, Pittsburgh and Tampa Bay ===
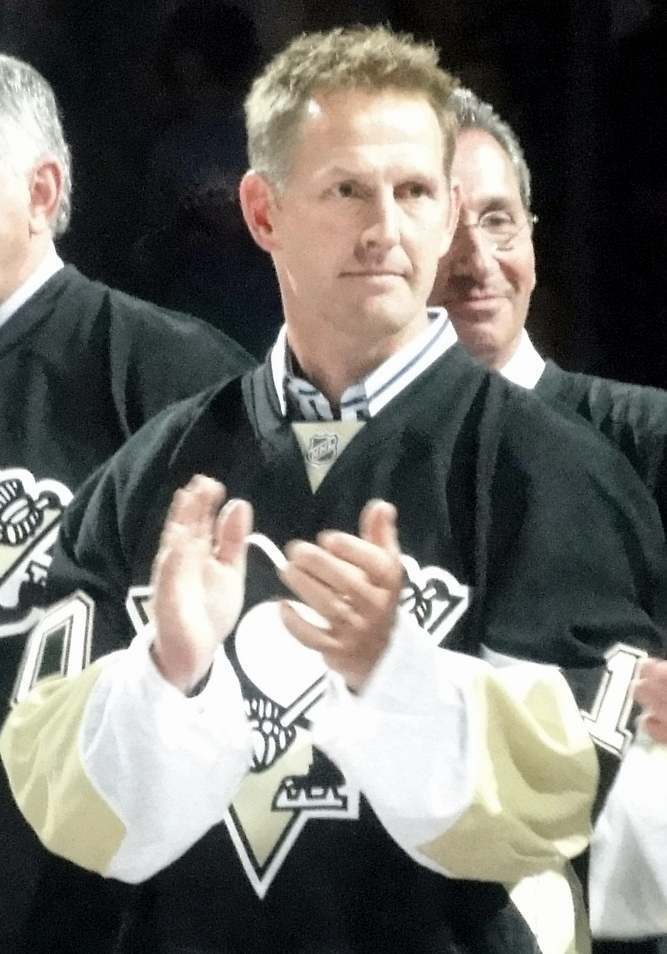
Roberts during pregame ceremony honoring final regular season game at Mellon Arena

While the NHL was shut down due to a labour dispute in 2004–05, the National Lacrosse League (NLL)'s Calgary Roughnecks selected Roberts in the sixth round of the 2004 NLL Draft, partially as a public relations stunt. He declined the chance to play professional lacrosse. When NHL play resumed in 2005–06, Roberts and Nieuwendyk each signed a two-year deal with the Florida Panthers. The pair, who were teammates in Toronto as well as Calgary, hoped to end their careers together in Florida. It did not happen, as chronic back pain forced Nieuwendyk's retirement in December 2006.

Roberts did not last much longer in Florida as, following a 40-point season in 2005–06, the Panthers sought to trade him to the Pittsburgh Penguins late in the 2006–07 season. Several members of the Penguins, including Mario Lemieux and general manager Ray Shero, sought to convince Roberts to agree to the deal as he was initially unsure about leaving Florida but ultimately agreed to the trade. The deal was completed at the February 27, 2007, trade deadline as Pittsburgh sent prospect Noah Welch to Florida in exchange for Roberts. He was brought in to add a leadership presence to a young Penguins team. He finished the regular season with 13 points in 19 games in Pittsburgh and helped the Penguins reach the playoffs for the first time in six years.

Injuries again hampered Roberts in 2007–08. He missed time early in the season due to a viral infection, then broke his left fibula in a game against the Buffalo Sabres. He was praised for skating off the ice without assistance despite the injury, but missed over two months of action while his leg healed. Appearing in only 38 games during the regular season, Roberts returned from the injury in time to score two goals and lead Pittsburgh to a victory in the first game of its opening round playoff series against the Ottawa Senators. At 41 years, 322 days old, he became the oldest player in NHL history to score more than one goal in a post-season game. He added two assists in ten additional playoff games for the Penguins.

Pittsburgh opted not to re-sign Roberts to a new contract following the season and traded both him and Ryan Malone – who was also a pending free agent – to the Tampa Bay Lightning in exchange for a third round draft pick on June 28, 2008. The deal gave Tampa Bay a brief window in which they had exclusive rights to negotiate a contract. He agreed to a one-year contract with the Lightning. Another injury, to his elbow, caused Roberts to miss 33 games of the 2008–09 season. He played only 30 games and recorded seven points. The Lightning placed him on waivers as the 2009 trade deadline approached, but no team claimed him. Nine days after playing his final NHL game, an 8–6 win in Calgary where he recorded an assist, Roberts announced his retirement on March 10, 2009.

== Fitness and training ==
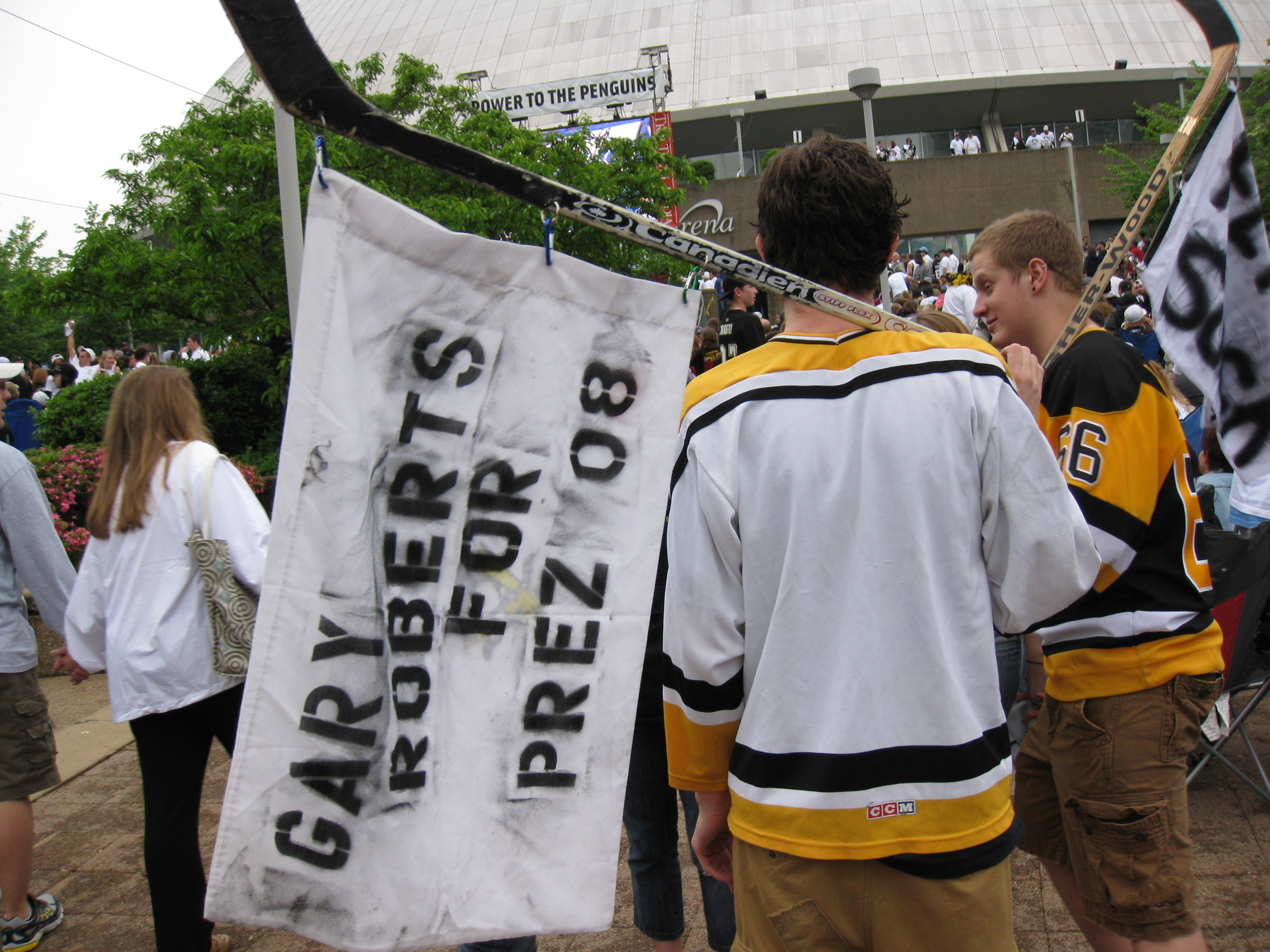
Roberts became a folk hero among Pittsburgh fans.

Roberts entered his first NHL training camp with the Flames in 1984 believing his summer lacrosse schedule was enough to keep him in proper hockey game shape. Coach Bob Johnson disagreed and hauled him in front of his peers as an example of someone who had not committed to being a hockey player. He was initially upset, but grew to realize that Johnson was correct, in that he was not particularly focused on his fitness. The criticism inspired Roberts to dedicate himself to personal training, and carried a reputation for being obsessed with nutrition and physical fitness throughout his career. He credited his fitness and nutrition regimen with helping him extend his career another 13 years after his first retirement.

As a player, Roberts helped train his peers during off-seasons. He was a member of the Dallas Stars' staff as the team's player development consultant during the 2010–11 NHL season. One of Roberts' early disciples, Tampa's Steven Stamkos, developed into a 50-goal player in his first season after training with Roberts and led to numerous players seeking to train with him. His growing reputation as a personal trainer led to the creation of the Gary Roberts High Performance Centre and Fitness Institute in Toronto, Ontario where he trains junior and professional players, including several in the NHL.

== Personal life ==
Roberts has been married twice and has four children. He and his first wife Tamra have a daughter. The couple were divorced while Roberts was a member of the Maple Leafs. With his second wife, Michelle, he has two sons and a daughter. Michelle assists her husband at the training centre. Roberts hosts an annual charity golf tournament in Uxbridge, Ontario, in support of Canadian Tire's Jumpstart program, which helps young people get involved in sports. He is an honoured member of the Whitby Sports Hall of Fame, inducted in 2010. Roberts coached his son's minor hockey team, the Central Ontario Wolves, in 2005.

== Career statistics ==
=== Regular season and playoffs ===
			Regular season					Playoffs
Season	Team	League	GP	G	A	Pts	PIM	GP	G	A	Pts	PIM
1982–83	Ottawa 67's	OHL	53	12	8	20	83	5	1	0	1	19
1983–84	Ottawa 67's	OHL	48	27	30	57	144	13	10	7	17	62
1984–85	Ottawa 67's	OHL	59	44	62	106	186	5	2	8	10	10
1984–85	Moncton Golden Flames	AHL	7	4	2	6	7	—	—	—	—	—
1985–86	Ottawa 67's	OHL	24	26	25	51	83	—	—	—	—	—
1985–86	Guelph Platers	OHL	23	18	15	33	65	20	18	13	31	43
1986–87	Moncton Golden Flames	AHL	38	20	18	38	72	—	—	—	—	—
1986–87	Calgary Flames	NHL	32	5	10	15	85	2	0	0	0	4
1987–88	Calgary Flames	NHL	74	13	15	28	282	9	2	3	5	29
1988–89	Calgary Flames	NHL	72	22	16	38	250	22	5	7	12	57
1989–90	Calgary Flames	NHL	78	39	33	72	222	6	2	5	7	41
1990–91	Calgary Flames	NHL	80	22	31	53	252	7	1	3	4	18
1991–92	Calgary Flames	NHL	76	53	37	90	207	—	—	—	—	—
1992–93	Calgary Flames	NHL	58	38	41	79	172	5	1	6	7	43
1993–94	Calgary Flames	NHL	73	41	43	84	145	7	2	6	8	24
1994–95	Calgary Flames	NHL	8	2	2	4	43	—	—	—	—	—
1995–96	Calgary Flames	NHL	35	22	20	42	78	—	—	—	—	—
1997–98	Carolina Hurricanes	NHL	61	20	29	49	103	—	—	—	—	—
1998–99	Carolina Hurricanes	NHL	77	14	28	42	178	6	1	1	2	8
1999–00	Carolina Hurricanes	NHL	69	23	30	53	62	—	—	—	—	—
2000–01	Toronto Maple Leafs	NHL	82	29	24	53	109	11	2	9	11	0
2001–02	Toronto Maple Leafs	NHL	69	21	27	48	63	19	7	12	19	56
2002–03	Toronto Maple Leafs	NHL	14	5	3	8	10	7	1	1	2	8
2003–04	Toronto Maple Leafs	NHL	72	28	20	48	84	13	4	4	8	10
2005–06	Florida Panthers	NHL	58	14	26	40	51	—	—	—	—	—
2006–07	Florida Panthers	NHL	50	13	16	29	71	—	—	—	—	—
2006–07	Pittsburgh Penguins	NHL	19	7	6	13	26	5	2	2	4	2
2007–08	Pittsburgh Penguins	NHL	38	3	12	15	40	11	2	2	4	32
2008–09	Tampa Bay Lightning	NHL	30	4	3	7	27	—	—	—	—	—
NHL totals			1,224	438	472	910	2,560	130	32	61	93	332

Medal record

Representing Canada

Ice hockey

World Junior Championships
Silver medal – second place	1986 Canada	

=== International ===
Year	Team	Event	Result	GP	G	A	Pts	PIM
1986	Canada	WJC	2nd place, silver medalist(s)	7	6	3	9	6
Junior totals				7	6	3	9	6

== Awards and honours ==
Junior
Award	Year	Ref.
OHL Second All-Star Team	1984–85; 1985–86	

National Hockey League
Award	Year	Ref.
Stanley Cup champion	1989	
NHL All-Star Game	1992, 1993, 2004	
Bill Masterton Memorial Trophy	1996	
Ralph T. Scurfield Humanitarian Award	1996	

== See also ==
- List of NHL players with 2,000 career penalty minutes
- List of NHL players with 1,000 games played

== Notes ==
- ^{a} Sources state that Roberts was a member of one Minto Cup winning team, but disagree on the year. Some claim he won in 1984, others 1985. Records, with photo, in the Archives of the Whitby Library show Roberts as a member of the 1985 Minto Cup-winning team.

Awards and achievements
Preceded by Dan Quinn	Calgary Flames' first-round draft pick 1984	Succeeded by Chris Biotti
Preceded by Pat LaFontaine	Bill Masterton Trophy Winner; 1996	Succeeded by Tony Granato
