= Bryan Deasley =

Canadian ice hockey player (born 1968)

- Born: November 26, 1968 (age 57) Toronto, Ontario, Canada
- Height: 6 ft 3 in (191 cm)
- Weight: 225 lb (102 kg; 16 st 1 lb)
- Position: Left wing
- Played for: Salt Lake Golden Eagles; Halifax Citadels; Canadian National Team
- NHL draft: 19th overall, 1987; Calgary Flames
- Playing career: 1988–1993

Bryan Deasley (born November 26, 1968) is a Canadian former professional ice hockey winger. He was a first round selection, 19th overall, by the Calgary Flames at the 1987 National Hockey League (NHL) Entry Draft. He never reached the NHL and retired in 1993 after one season touring with the Canadian National Team and four in the minor leagues. Deasley worked as a player agent for several years.

== Playing career ==
A native of Toronto, Ontario, Deasley planned to play junior hockey with the North Bay Centennials before he was recruited by the University of Michigan. He played two seasons of college hockey with the Michigan Wolverines program. After recording 24 points in 38 games as a freshman in 1986–87, the Calgary Flames selected him with their first round pick, 19th overall, at the 1987 NHL entry draft. The Flames praised Deasley for his aggressiveness and willingness to battle in the corners. Deasley returned to Michigan where he scored 18 goals in 27 games despite missing 12 games due to a broken leg. He also played in the 1987 Spengler Cup with Team Canada which defeated the Soviet Wings to win the tournament championship.

Deasley left Michigan after two seasons and toured with the Canadian National Team in 1988–89 where he scored 19 goals and 19 assists in 54 games. He joined Calgary's International Hockey League (IHL) affiliate, the Salt Lake Golden Eagles for their playoff run. Deasley recorded three goals and three assists for the Eagles who lost the Turner Cup final. He then played three full seasons with Salt Lake between 1989 and 1992 where he had seasons of 27, 45 and 35 points. The Flames traded Deasley to the Quebec Nordiques prior to the 1992–93 season. He spent the year with their American Hockey League (AHL) affiliate, the Halifax Citadels. He played only 37 games, and recorded 20 points, before retiring as a player.

== Post-playing career ==
Since retiring as a player Deasley worked as a player agent for several years. He represented John Tavares while the player was still in junior hockey, but Tavares' family opted to change representation when Deasley left his employer, Siskinds Sports Management in 2008. Deasley left his career as an agent to join the Canadian Sports Centre Ontario as vice-president of marketing and business development.

== Career statistics ==
			Regular season					Playoffs
Season	Team	League	GP	G	A	Pts	PIM	GP	G	A	Pts	PIM
1985–86	St. Michael's Buzzers	MetJHL
1986–87	Michigan Wolverines	CCHA	38	13	11	24	74	—	—	—	—	—
1987–88	Michigan Wolverines	CCHA	27	18	4	22	38	—	—	—	—	—
1988–89	Canada	Intl	54	19	19	38	32	—	—	—	—	—
1988–89	Salt Lake Golden Eagles	IHL	—	—	—	—	—	7	3	2	5	25
1989–90	Salt Lake Golden Eagles	IHL	71	16	11	27	46	11	4	0	4	8
1990–91	Salt Lake Golden Eagles	IHL	75	24	21	45	63	—	—	—	—	—
1991–92	Salt Lake Golden Eagles	IHL	65	12	23	35	57	2	0	0	0	4
1992–93	Halifax Citadels	AHL	37	9	11	20	46	—	—	—	—	—
IHL totals			211	52	55	107	166	20	7	2	9	37

Preceded by George Pelawa	Calgary Flames' first-round draft pick 1987	Succeeded by Jason Muzzatti
