= George Pelawa =

American ice hockey player (1968–1986)

- Born: February 22, 1968 Bemidji, Minnesota, U.S.
- Died: August 30, 1986 (aged 18) Bemidji, Minnesota, U.S.
- Height: 6 ft 3 in (191 cm)
- Weight: 245 lb (111 kg; 17 st 7 lb)
- Position: Right wing
- Shot: Right
- NHL draft: 16th overall, 1986; Calgary Flames
- Playing career: n/a–n/a

George Dale Pelawa (February 22, 1968 – August 30, 1986) was a high school hockey right winger from Bemidji, Minnesota. He was named Minnesota Mr. Hockey in 1986 as the top high-school player in the state and was selected in the first round, 16th overall, by the Calgary Flames in the 1986 NHL entry draft. He died in an automobile accident three months after the draft.

== Playing career ==
Pelawa was a three-sport star. As a first baseman, he led his school to the Minnesota State Baseball tournament in 1985 and was scouted by the Minnesota Twins. He was also an all-state football linebacker, recruited to play in the National Collegiate Athletic Association by Notre Dame, Penn State and Minnesota.

As a hockey player, Pelawa set new records at Bemidji High for goals and points, leading the school to the state championship tournament in his junior and senior years. He scored 29 goals and 55 points in his senior year and was named Minnesota Mr. Hockey for 1986.

He committed to play for the University of North Dakota, and was selected in the first round, 16th overall, by the Calgary Flames at the 1986 NHL entry draft. His nicknames in hockey were "Ice Box" and "The Great White Shark", and at 245 pounds, would have been the biggest player in NHL history if he had played at the time he was drafted.

== Death ==
Shortly after moving into his dorm at North Dakota, Pelawa had returned to Bemidji and was visiting with family and friends on the night of August 30, 1986. He and his brother Joe were returning from a night out when their car broke down. After picking up another car, the pair were returning to the stalled vehicle when they were struck by another driver. Joe, who was driving their car, and the other driver were both hospitalized with serious injuries. George suffered massive internal injuries, and was declared dead at the scene. The Beltrami County Sheriff's office stated that he was not wearing a seatbelt, and likely would have survived if he had. Both drivers were found to have been intoxicated, and the accident occurred after Joe failed to yield at a T-intersection.

Tom Cochrane's song "Big League" was rumoured to be about Pelawa. Cochrane says the lyrics are based on a true story, but that it is about another player. The Flames, meanwhile, honored Pelawa by offering a scholarship to Bemidji High School students in his name. Pelawa's parents, Frank and Winnie, continued to fund the scholarship after the Flames' 20-year commitment expired in 2007; however, the team and Pelawa's friends resumed their commitment to maintaining the scholarship in 2010.

Preceded by Chris Biotti	Calgary Flames' first-round draft pick 1986	Succeeded by Bryan Deasley
