= Jason Muzzatti =

Canadian-Italian ice hockey player

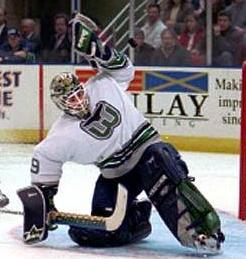
- Born: February 3, 1970 (age 56) Toronto, Ontario, Canada
- Height: 6 ft 1 in (185 cm)
- Weight: 190 lb (86 kg; 13 st 8 lb)
- Position: Goaltender
- Caught: Left
- Played for: NHL; Calgary Flames; Hartford Whalers; New York Rangers; San Jose Sharks; DEL; Eisbären Berlin; Augsburger Panther; SM-liiga; Tappara; Serie A HCJ Milano Vipers; HC Bolzano
- National team: Canada and Italy
- NHL draft: 21st overall, 1988; Calgary Flames
- Playing career: 1993–2007

Jason Mark Muzzatti (born February 3, 1970) is a Canadian-Italian former professional ice hockey goaltender, and the current goaltending development coach for the Carolina Hurricanes. He played 62 games in the National Hockey League between 1993 and 1998 for four teams. The rest of his career, which lasted from 1991 to 2007, was spent in various minor leagues and in Europe. Internationally Muzzatti played briefly for the Canadian national team in the early 1990s, and later in his career played for the Italian national team at several World Championships and the 2006 Winter Olympics.

== Playing career ==
Muzzatti played four seasons at Michigan State University with a record of 83 wins, 34 losses, and 6 ties. He was drafted by the Calgary Flames in the 1988 NHL entry draft as the 21st pick in the first round. He joined the Salt Lake Golden Eagles of the IHL in 1991. He joined the Flames in 1993 but he had just a short career in Calgary, playing only two games in two seasons. He was claimed on waivers by the Hartford Whalers in 1995 and played 53 games before he was traded to the New York Rangers. He finished his NHL career in 1997–98 with the San Jose Sharks.

Muzzatti joined Deutsche Eishockey Liga side Eisbären Berlin in 1998. He joined Tappara, a Finnish SM-liiga team, one year later before returning to Germany and the Augsburger Panther for one season. In 2001, he moved to Italy to play for Serie A team HC Milano Vipers. Muzzatti became the number one goaltender for Milano. In 2004 Muzzatti was contracted by another Italian top team, Hockey Club Bolzano. Muzzatti was Bolzano's top goalie for two seasons.

In 2006, after 8 seasons in European top leagues, Muzzatti returned to North America and was contracted by Flint Generals of the United Hockey League. Muzzatti played the entire 2006–07 season in Flint Generals after which he retired. He was named the coach of the Generals in 2009.

== International career ==
Despite being born in Canada, and representing the Canadian national team during 1992–93, Muzzatti also holds Italian citizenship and played for the Italian national ice hockey team. He played in the 2006 Winter Olympics, held in Turin, Italy for the host country.

== Coaching career ==
In 2008-09 Muzzatti started as an assistant coach with the Flint Generals of the International Hockey League (IHL). The following season in 2009-10 Muzzatti was hired as head coach of the Generals, and won the IHL Coach of the Year award that year.

Starting with the 2015–16 season, Muzzatti was the goaltending coach for the Michigan State Spartans for four seasons.

On August 13, 2019, Muzzatti was hired as the goaltending coach of the Carolina Hurricanes. He joined the coaching staff of Rod Brind'Amour, a former teammate with the Michigan State Spartan hockey team during the 1988–89 season. Serving as the team's goaltender development coach, Muzzatti won the Stanley Cup with the Hurricanes in 2026.

== Personal ==
Muzzatti and former NCAA assistant coach Willie Mitchell co-founded Just Goalies, a training camp for young goaltenders. NHL goaltender Ryan Miller credits Muzzatti for aiding his development and considers him a friend.

== Career statistics ==
=== Regular season and playoffs ===
			Regular season									Playoffs
Season	Team	League	GP	W	L	T	MIN	GA	SO	GAA	SV%	GP	W	L	MIN	GA	SO	GAA	SV%
1985–86	St. Michael's Buzzers	MJBHL	11	6	3	0	517	48	0	5.57	—	—	—	—	—	—	—	—	—
1986–87	St. Michael's Buzzers	MJBHL	20	10	5	2	1054	69	1	3.93	—	—	—	—	—	—	—	—	—
1987–88	Michigan State University	CCHA	33	19	9	3	1915	109	0	3.41	.877	—	—	—	—	—	—	—	—
1988–89	Michigan State University	CCA	42	32	9	1	2515	127	3	3.03	.876	—	—	—	—	—	—	—	—
1989–90	Michigan State University	CCA	33	24	6	0	1976	99	0	3.01	.889	—	—	—	—	—	—	—	—
1990–91	Michigan State University	CCA	22	8	10	2	1204	75	1	3.74	.859	—	—	—	—	—	—	—	—
1991–92	Salt Lake Golden Eagles	IHL	52	24	22	5	3033	167	2	3.30	—	4	1	3	247	18	0	4.37	—
1992–93	Canadian National Team	Intl	16	6	9	0	880	53	0	3.84	—	—	—	—	—	—	—	—	—
1992–93	Indianapolis Ice	IHL	12	5	6	1	707	48	0	4.07	.884	—	—	—	—	—	—	—	—
1992–93	Salt Lake Golden Ealges	IHL	13	5	6	1	747	52	0	4.18	.869	—	—	—	—	—	—	—	—
1993–94	Calgary Flames	NHL	1	0	1	0	60	8	0	8.00	.771	—	—	—	—	—	—	—	—
1993–94	Saint John Flames	AHL	51	26	21	3	2939	183	2	3.74	.877	7	3	4	415	19	0	2.75	.903
1994–95	Calgary Flames	NHL	1	0	0	0	10	0	0	0.00	1.000	—	—	—	—	—	—	—	—
1994–95	Saint John Flames	AHL	31	10	14	4	1741	101	2	3.48	.892	—	—	—	—	—	—	—	—
1995–96	Hartford Whalers	NHL	22	4	8	3	1013	49	1	2.90	.911	—	—	—	—	—	—	—	—
1995–96	Springfield Falcons	AHL	5	4	0	1	300	12	1	2.40	.912	—	—	—	—	—	—	—	—
1996–97	Hartford Whalers	NHL	31	9	13	5	1591	91	0	3.43	.888	—	—	—	—	—	—	—	—
1997–98	New York Rangers	NHL	6	0	3	2	313	17	0	3.26	.891	—	—	—	—	—	—	—	—
1997–98	Hartford Wolf Pack	AHL	17	11	5	1	999	57	0	3.42	.897	—	—	—	—	—	—	—	—
1997–98	San Jose Sharks	NHL	1	0	0	0	27	2	0	4.49	.846	—	—	—	—	—	—	—	—
1997–98	Kentucky Thoroughblades	AHL	7	2	3	2	430	25	0	3.49	.881	3	0	3	153	13	0	5.07	.824
1998–99	Eisbären Berlin	DEL	4	—	—	—	240	12	0	3.00	.917	3	0	3	166	14	0	5.06	.837
1999–00	Tappara	FIN	41	26	9	5	2479	94	5	2.28	.921	4	1	3	252	14	0	3.33	.890
2000–01	Augsburg Panthers	DEL	43	—	—	—	2391	143	1	3.59	.896	—	—	—	—	—	—	—	—
2001–02	HC Milano	ITA	34	—	—	—	—	—	—	—	—	—	—	—	—	—	—	—	—
2002–03	HC Milano	ITA	32	—	—	—	—	—	—	2.06	.940	—	—	—	—	—	—	—	—
2003–04	HC Milano	ITA	27	—	—	—	1531	62	2	2.43	.892	—	—	—	—	—	—	—	—
2004–05	HC Bolzano	ITA	31	—	—	—	1694	82	1	2.90	.910	—	—	—	—	—	—	—	—
2005–06	HC Bolzano	ITA	26	—	—	—	1411	63	1	2.68	.916	2	—	—	—	—	—	—	—
2006–07	Flint Generals	UHL	41	18	15	6	2352	131	0	3.34	.891	5	2	3	305	19	0	3.74	.877
NHL totals			62	13	25	10	3013	167	1	3.33	.894	—	—	—	—	—	—	—	—

=== International ===
Year	Team	Event	GP	W	L	T	MIN	GA	SO	GAA	SV%
2004	Italy	WC-B	3	2	1	0	175	5	1	1.72	.933
2005	Italy	WC-B	4	3	0	1	240	3	1	0.75	.963
2006	Italy	OLY	4	0	1	2	212	14	0	3.96	.891
2006	Italy	WC	6	1	4	1	304	18	0	3.55	.897
2007	Italy	WC	1	0	1	0	60	3	0	3.00	.917
Senior totals			18	6	7	4	991	43	2	2.60	—

== Awards and honours ==
Award	Year
All-CCHA Second Team	1987–88
CCHA All-Tournament Team	1989
All-CCHA First Team	1989–90
AHCA West Second-Team All-American	1989–90
CCHA All-Tournament Team	1990

Awards and achievements
Preceded by Bryan Deasley	Calgary Flames' first-round draft pick 1988	Succeeded by Trevor Kidd
Preceded by Paul Connell	CCHA Most Valuable Player in Tournament; 1989	Succeeded by Peter White
