= Chris Biotti =

American ice hockey player (born 1967)

- Born: April 22, 1967 (age 59) Waltham, Massachusetts, U.S.
- Height: 6 ft 3 in (191 cm)
- Weight: 198 lb (90 kg; 14 st 2 lb)
- Position: Defense
- Played for: Salt Lake Golden Eagles (IHL)
- NHL draft: 17th overall, 1985; Calgary Flames
- Playing career: 1987–1993

Chris Biotti (born April 22, 1967, in Waltham, Massachusetts) is a former professional ice hockey defenseman. He was drafted in the first round, 17th overall, by the Calgary Flames in the 1985 NHL entry draft.

== Career statistics ==
=== Regular season and playoffs ===
			Regular season					Playoffs
Season	Team	League	GP	G	A	Pts	PIM	GP	G	A	Pts	PIM
1983–84	Belmont Hill School	HS-Prep	23	10	20	30		—	—	—	—	—
1984–85	Belmont Hill School	HS-Prep	21	13	24	37		—	—	—	—	—
1985–86	Harvard University	ECAC	15	3	5	8	18	—	—	—	—	—
1986–87	Harvard University	ECAC	30	1	6	7	23	—	—	—	—	—
1987–88	Salt Lake Golden Eagles	IHL	72	5	21	26	75	12	2	3	5	33
1988–89	Salt Lake Golden Eagles	IHL	57	6	14	20	44	12	3	4	7	16
1989–90	Salt Lake Golden Eagles	IHL	60	9	19	28	73	3	1	0	1	2
1990–91	EV MAK Bruneck	ITA	32	11	18	29	16	—	—	—	—	—
1991–92	EV MAK Bruneck	ITA	18	6	18	24	8	7	2	2	4	7
1991–92	EV MAK Bruneck	AL	18				53	—	—	—	—	—
1992–93	EV MAK Bruneck	ITA	11	2	1	3	10	—	—	—	—	—
1992–93	EV MAK Bruneck	AL	27	5				—	—	—	—	—
IHL totals			189	20	54	74	192	27	6	7	13	51
ITA totals			61	19	37	56	34	7	2	2	4	7

=== International ===
Year	Team	Event	GP	G	A	Pts	PIM
1985	United States	WJC	7	0	0	0	4
1986	United States	WJC	7	1	2	3	6
1987	United States	WJC	7	3	2	5	8
Senior totals			21	4	4	8	18

Preceded by Gary Roberts	Calgary Flames' first-round draft pick 1985	Succeeded by George Pelawa
