= List of Calgary Flames draft picks =

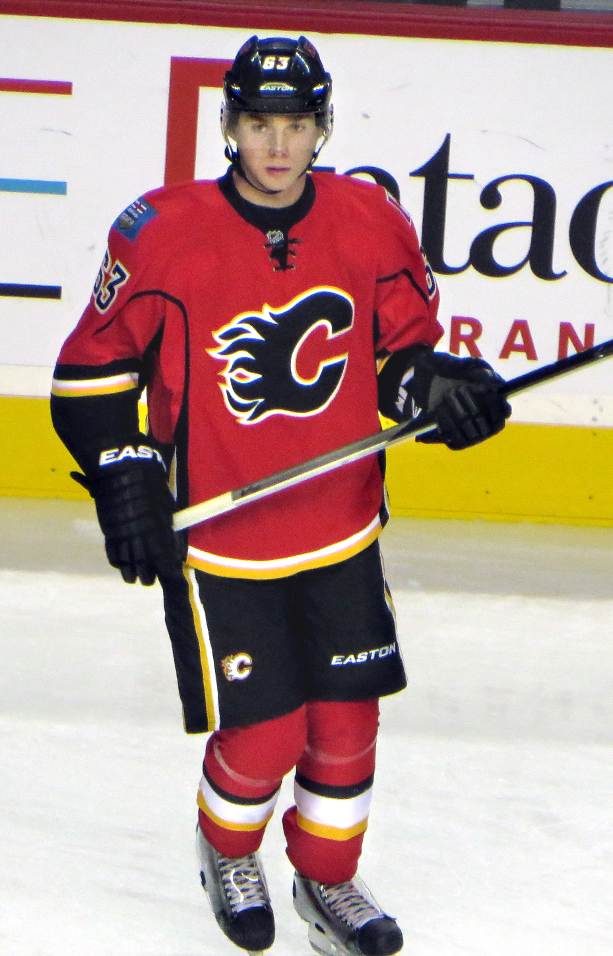
Sam Bennett was the Flames' first choice in the 2014 NHL entry draft.

The Calgary Flames are a professional ice hockey franchise based in Calgary, Alberta. They play in the Pacific Division of the Western Conference in the National Hockey League (NHL). The franchise was founded in 1972 as the Atlanta Flames, and relocated to Calgary in 1980. Since arriving in Calgary, the Flames have drafted 378 players. The 2024 draft was the 45th in which Calgary participated.

The NHL entry draft is held each June, allowing teams to select players who have turned 18 years old by September 15 in the year the draft is held. The draft order is determined by the previous season's order of finish, with non-playoff teams drafting first, followed by the teams that made the playoffs, with the specific order determined by the number of points earned by each team. Since 2016, the NHL holds a weighted lottery for the 15 non-playoff teams, allowing the winners to move up to the top three selections. From 1995 to 2012 the winner of the draft lottery was allowed to move up a maximum of four positions in the entry draft. The team with the fewest points has the best chance of winning the lottery, with each successive team given a lower chance of moving up in the draft. The Flames have never won the lottery. Between 1986 and 1994, the NHL also held a Supplemental Draft for players in American colleges.

Calgary's first draft pick was Denis Cyr, taken 13th overall in the 1980 NHL entry draft. The highest that Calgary has drafted is fourth overall, which they have done once, they selected Sam Bennett (2014) at the fourth spot. Eleven picks went on to play over 1,000 NHL games: Al MacInnis, Gary Roberts, Paul Ranheim, Brett Hull, Gary Suter, Joe Nieuwendyk, Theoren Fleury, Cory Stillman, Derek Morris, Dion Phaneuf and Mikael Backlund. Three of Calgary's draft picks, MacInnis, Joe Nieuwendyk and Brett Hull have been elected to the Hockey Hall of Fame. 1986 draft pick Tom Quinlan was also drafted by baseball's Toronto Blue Jays and chose a career in Major League Baseball over the NHL.

== Key ==
General
Pos	Position
S	Supplemental draft selection

Positions
G	Goaltender	C	Centre
D	Defenceman	LW	Left wing
RW	Right wing	F	Forward

Statistics
GP	Games played	G	Goals
A	Assists	Pts	Points
PIM	Penalties in minutes	GAA	Goals against average
W	Wins	L	Losses
T	Ties	OT	Overtime/Shootout losses

== Draft picks ==
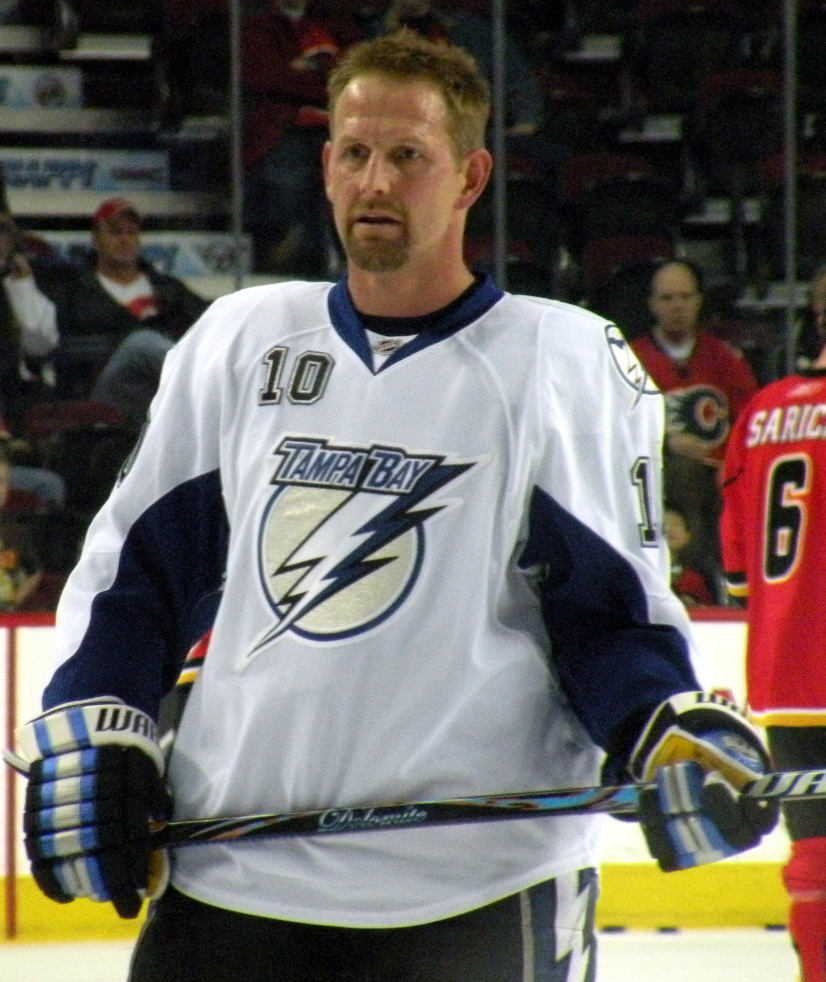
The Flames' first pick in 1984, Gary Roberts played for 21 NHL seasons.

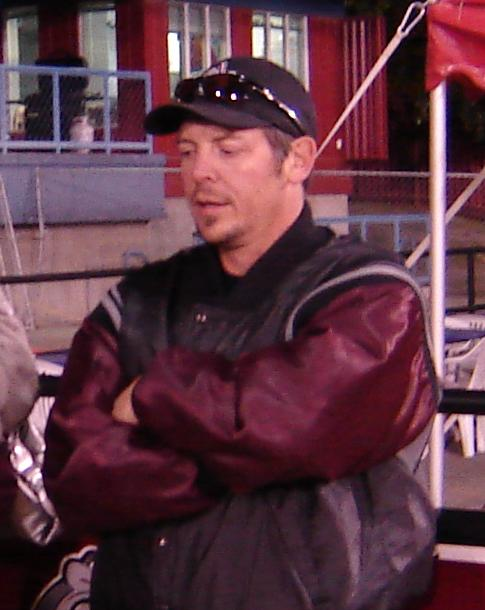
Taken 166th overall in 1987, Theoren Fleury went on to play over 1,000 NHL games.

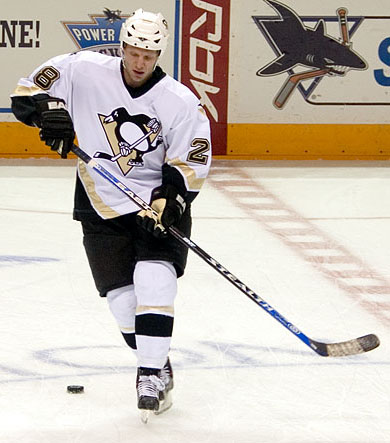
Though he never played in Calgary, Nils Ekman was a 5th round pick of the Flames in 1994.

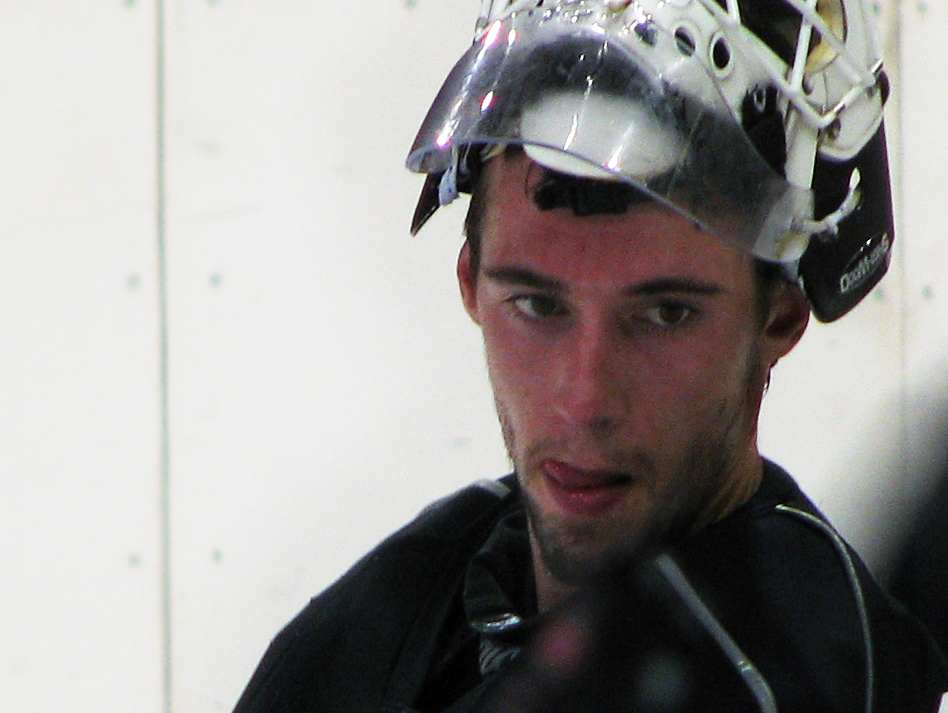
The Flames took Dany Sabourin in the 4th round in 1998.

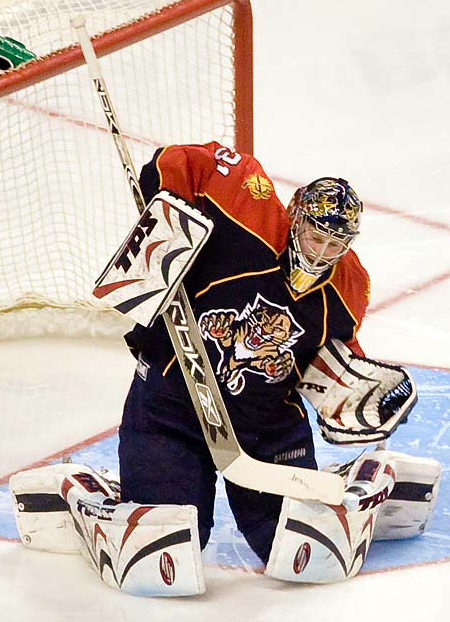
Craig Anderson was Calgary's third pick in 1999.

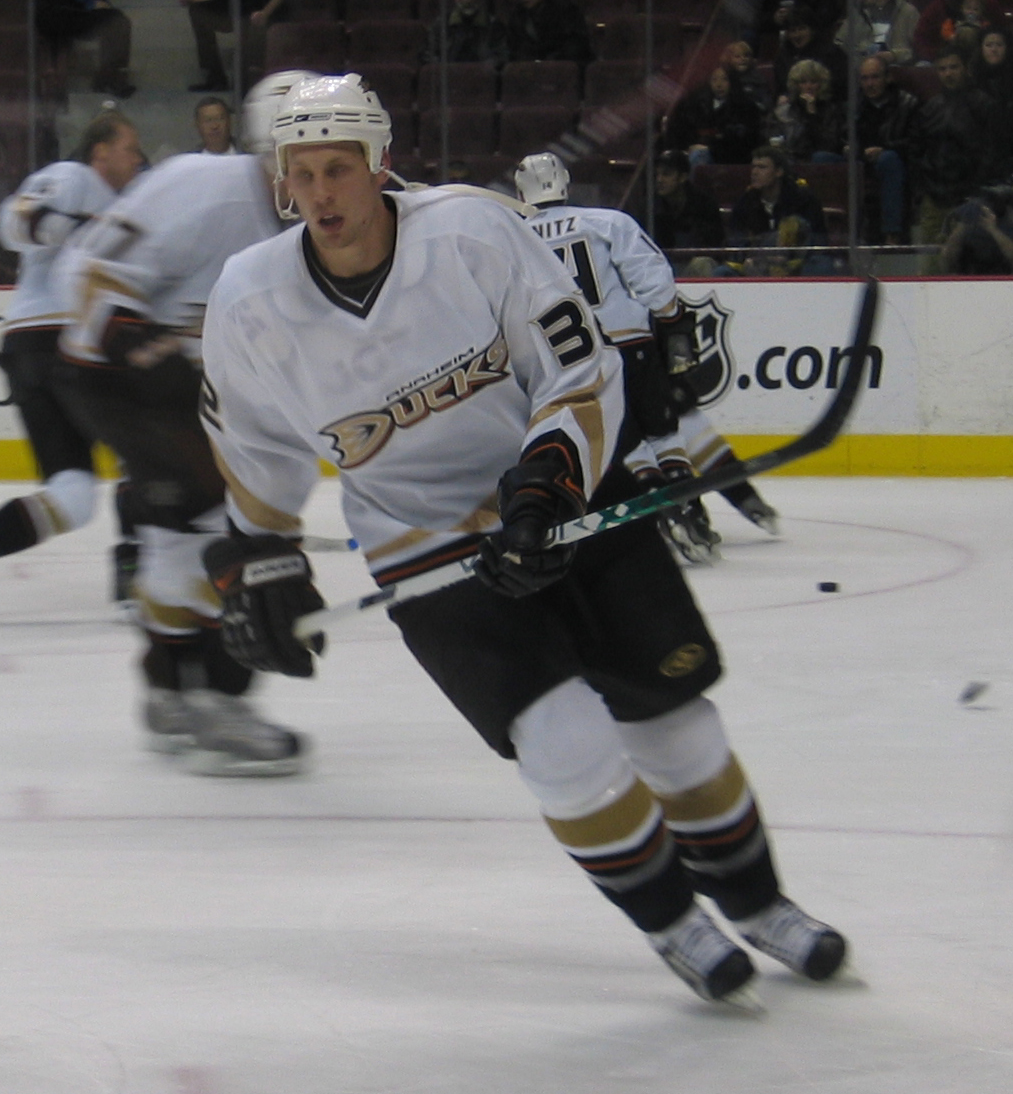
Drafted by the Flames in the 5th round in 2000, Travis Moen never played for Calgary.

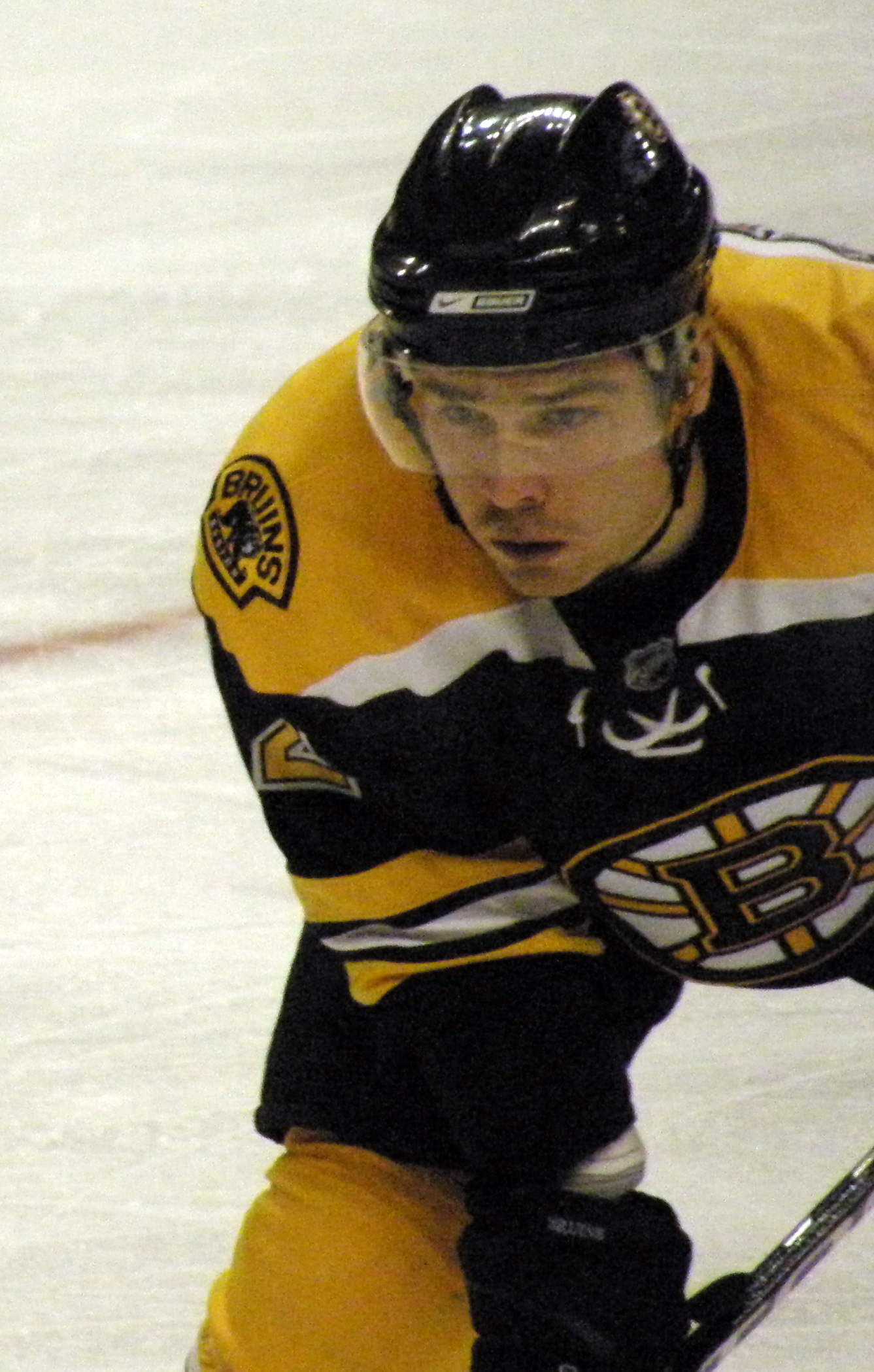
Chuck Kobasew was the Flames' first selection in 2001.

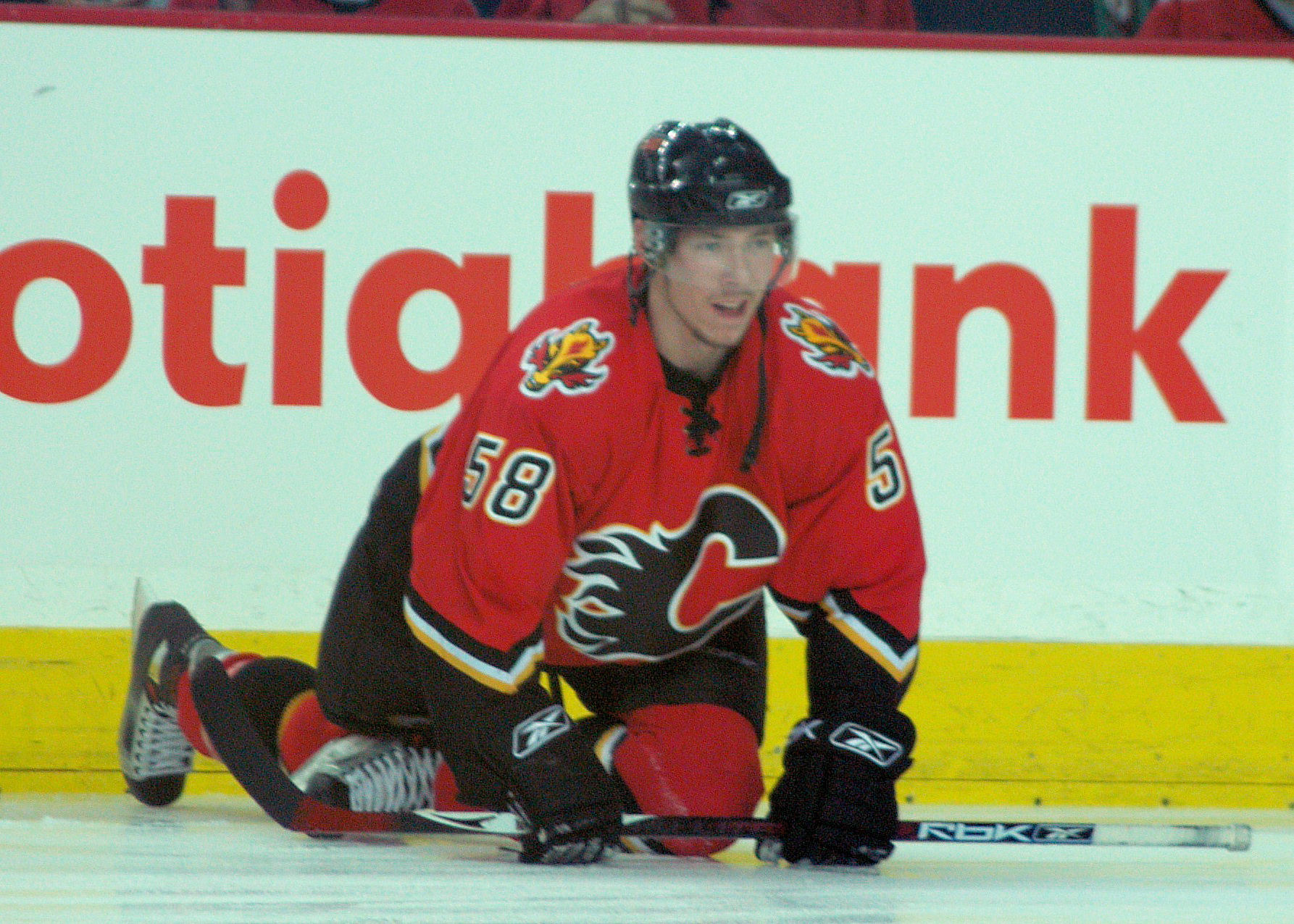
David Moss was selected in the 7th round of the 2001 draft.

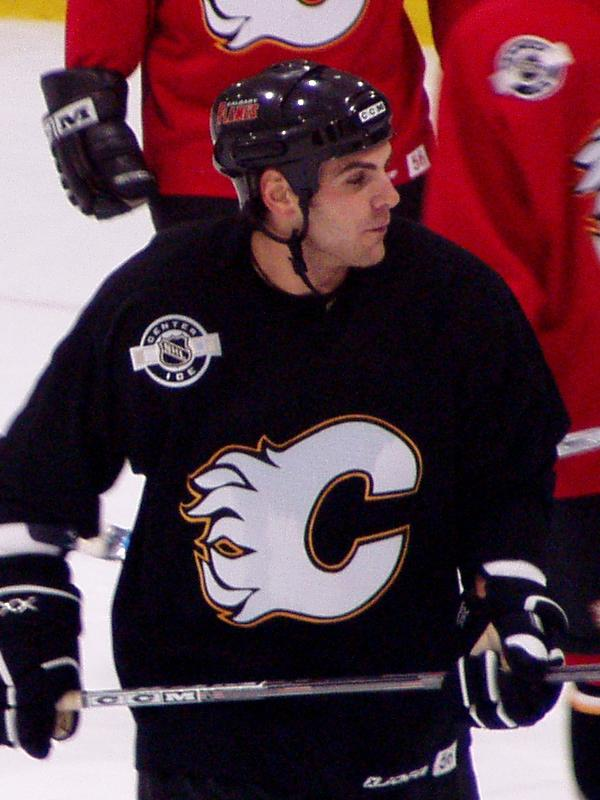
The Flames took Eric Nystrom with their first pick, 10th overall, in 2002.

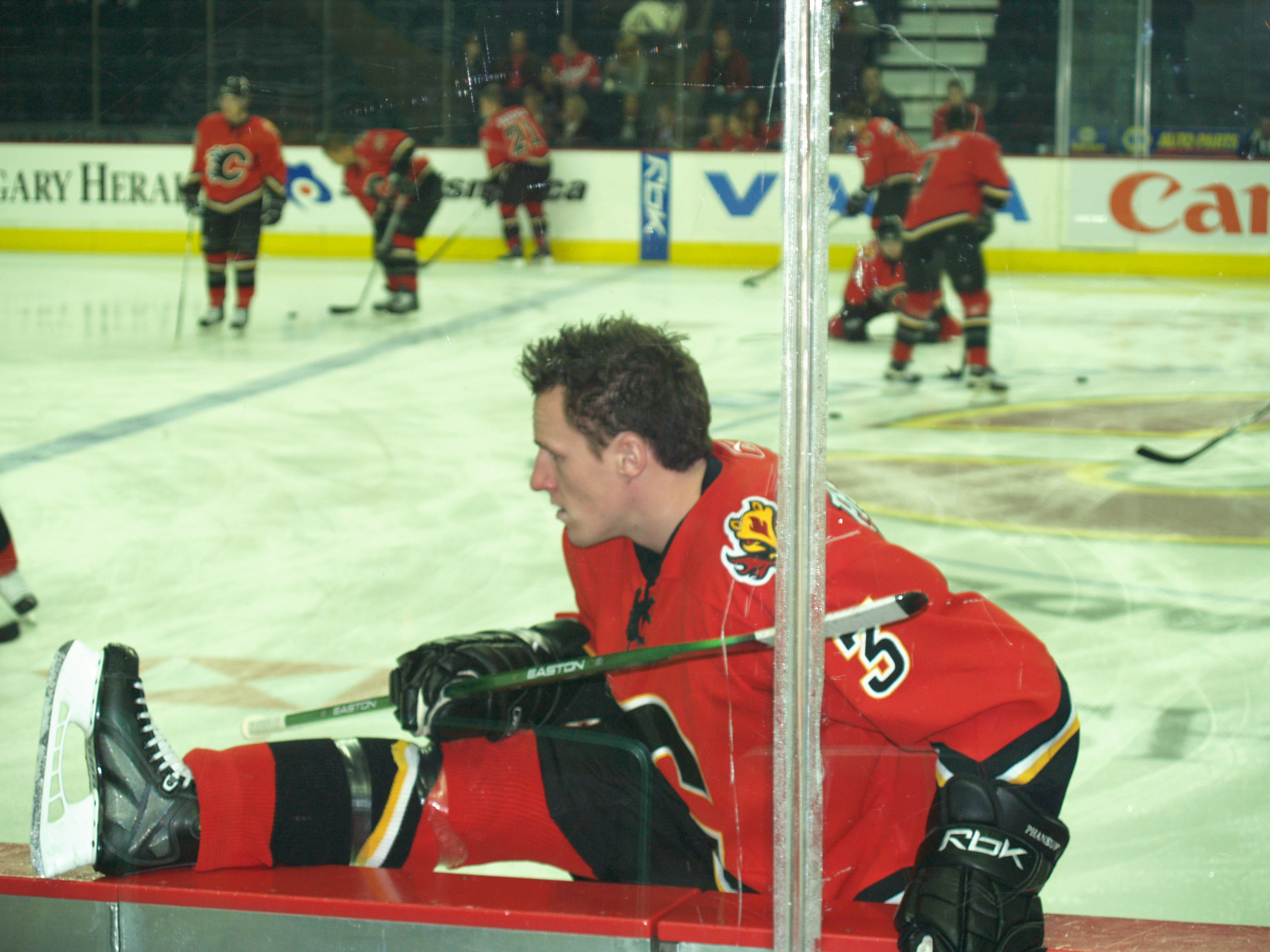
Dion Phaneuf was the Flames' 1st round pick in 2003.

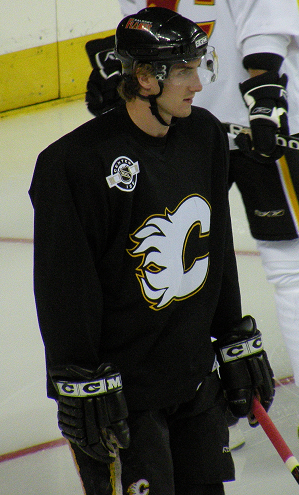
Matt Pelech was the Flames' top pick in 2005.

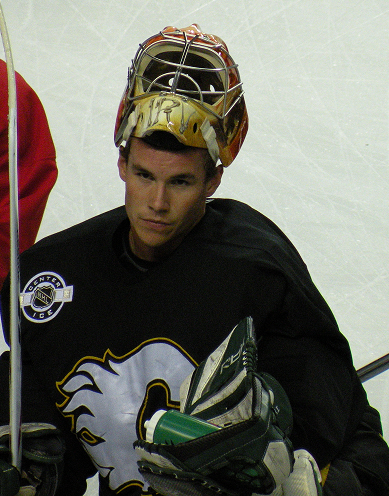
The Flames selected Leland Irving with their 1st round pick in 2006.

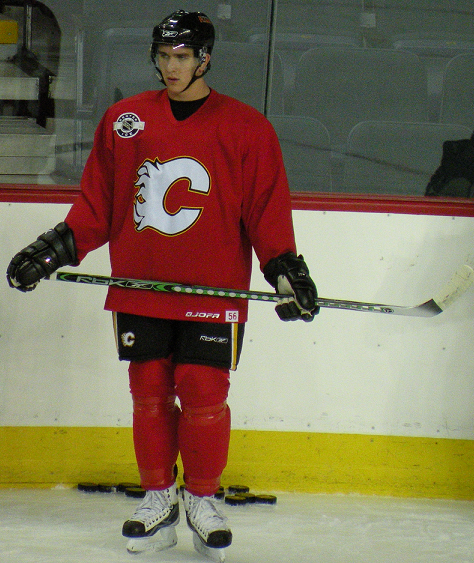
Swedish forward Mikael Backlund was Calgary's top pick in 2007.

Statistics are complete as of the 2025–26 NHL season and show each player's career regular season totals in the NHL. Wins, losses, ties, overtime losses and goals against average apply to goaltenders and are used only for players at that position. This list includes players drafted by the team in Calgary only.

Draft	Round	Pick	Player	Nationality	Pos	GP	G	A	Pts	PIM	W	L	T	OT	GAA
1980	1	13	Denis Cyr	Canada	RW	193	41	43	84	36					
1980	2	31	Tony Curtale	United States	D	2	0	0	0	0					
1980	2	32	Kevin LaVallee	Canada	LW	366	110	125	235	85					
1980	2	39	Steve Konroyd	Canada	D	895	41	195	236	863					
1980	4	76	Marc Roy	Canada	RW										
1980	5	97	Randy Turnbull	Canada	D	1	0	0	0	2					
1980	6	118	John Multan	Canada	RW										
1980	7	139	Dave Newsom	Canada	LW										
1980	8	160	Claude Drouin	Canada	C										
1980	9	181	Hakan Loob	Sweden	RW	450	193	236	429	189					
1980	10	202	Steven Fletcher	Canada	LW	3	0	0	0	5					
1981	1	15	Al MacInnis	Canada	D	1416	340	934	1274	1501					
1981	3	56	Mike Vernon	Canada	G	781	0	39	39	271	385	273	92	—	3.00
1981	4	78	Peter Madach	Sweden	C										
1981	5	99	Mario Simioni	Canada	LW										
1981	6	120	Todd Hooey	Canada	RW										
1981	7	141	Rick Heppner	United States	D										
1981	8	162	Dale DeGray	Canada	D	153	18	47	65	195					
1981	9	183	George Boudreau	United States	D										
1981	10	204	Bruce Eakin	Canada	C	13	2	2	4	4					
1982	2	29	Dave Reierson	Canada	D	2	0	0	0	0					
1982	3	51	Jim Laing	United States	D										
1982	4	65	Dave Meszaros	Canada	G										
1982	4	72	Mark Lamb	Canada	C	403	46	100	146	291					
1982	5	93	Lou Kiriakou	Canada	D										
1982	6	114	Jeff Vaive	Canada	C										
1982	6	118	Mats Kihlstrom	Sweden	D										
1982	7	135	Brad Ramsden	Canada	C										
1982	8	156	Roy Myllari	Canada	D										
1982	9	177	Ted Pearson	Canada	LW										
1982	10	198	Jim Uens	Canada	C										
1982	11	219	Rick Erdall	United States	C										
1982	12	240	Dale Thompson	Canada	RW										
1983	1	13	Dan Quinn	Canada	C	805	266	419	685	533					
1983	3	51	Brian Bradley	Canada	C	651	182	321	503	528					
1983	3	55	Perry Berezan	Canada	C	378	61	75	136	277					
1983	4	66	John Bekkers	Canada	RW										
1983	4	71	Kevan Guy	Canada	D	156	5	20	25	138					
1983	4	77	Bill Claviter	United States	LW										
1983	5	91	Igor Liba	Slovakia	LW	37	7	18	25	36					
1983	6	111	Grant Blair	Canada	G										
1983	7	131	Jeff Hogg	Canada	G										
1983	8	151	Chris MacDonald	Canada	D										
1983	9	171	Rob Kivell	Canada	D										
1983	10	191	Tom Pratt	United States	D										
1983	11	211	Jaroslav Benak	Czech Republic	D										
1983	12	231	Sergei Makarov	Russia	RW	424	134	250	384	317					
1984	1	12	Gary Roberts	Canada	LW	1224	438	471	909	2560					
1984	2	33	Ken Sabourin	Canada	D	74	2	8	10	201					
1984	2	38	Paul Ranheim	United States	LW	1013	161	199	360	288					
1984	4	75	Petr Rosol	Czech Republic	RW										
1984	5	96	Joel Paunio	Finland	LW										
1984	6	117	Brett Hull	United States	RW	1269	741	650	1391	458					
1984	7	138	Kevan Melrose	Canada	D										
1984	8	159	Jiri Hrdina	Czech Republic	C	250	45	85	130	92					
1984	9	180	Gary Suter	United States	D	1145	203	642	845	1349					
1984	10	200	Petr Rucka	Czech Republic	C										
1984	11	221	Stefan Jonsson	Sweden	D										
1984	12	241	Rudolf Suchanek	Czech Republic	D										
1985	1	17	Chris Biotti	United States	D										
1985	2	27	Joe Nieuwendyk	Canada	C	1257	564	562	1126	677					
1985	2	38	Jeff Wenaas	Canada	C										
1985	3	59	Lane MacDonald	United States	L										
1985	4	80	Roger Johansson	Sweden	D	161	9	34	43	163					
1985	5	101	Esa Keskinen	Finland	C										
1985	6	122	Tim Sweeney	United States	LW	291	55	83	138	123					
1985	7	143	Stu Grimson	Canada	LW	729	17	22	39	2113					
1985	8	164	Nate Smith	United States	D										
1985	9	185	Darryl Olsen	Canada	D	1	0	0	0	0					
1985	10	206	Peter Romberg	Germany	D										
1985	11	227	Alexander Kozhevnikov	Russia	LW										
1985	12	248	Bill Gregoire	Canada	D										
1986	1	16	George Pelawa	United States	RW										
1986	2	37	Brian Glynn	Germany	D	431	25	79	104	410					
1986	4	79	Tom Quinlan	United States	RW										
1986	5	100	Scott Bloom	United States	LW										
1986	6	121	John Parker	United States	C										
1986	7	142	Rick Lessard	Canada	D	15	0	4	4	18					
1986	8	163	Mark Olsen	United States	D										
1986	9	184	Scott Sharples	Canada	G	1	0	0	0	0	0	0	1	—	3.69
1986	10	205	Doug Pickel	Canada	LW										
1986	11	226	Anders Lindstrom	Sweden	C										
1986	12	247	Antonin Stavjana	Czech Republic	D										
1986	S	19	Steve MacSwain	United States	RW										
1987	1	19	Bryan Deasley	Canada	LW										
1987	2	25	Stephane Matteau	Canada	LW	848	144	172	316	742					
1987	2	40	Kevin Grant	Canada	D										
1987	3	61	Scott Mahoney	Canada	RW										
1987	4	70	Tim Harris	Canada	RW										
1987	5	103	Tim Corkery	Canada	D										
1987	6	124	Joe Aloi	Canada	D										
1987	7	145	Peter Ciavaglia	United States	C	5	0	0	0	0					
1987	8	166	Theoren Fleury	Canada	RW	1084	455	633	1088	1840					
1987	9	187	Mark Osiecki	United States	D	93	3	11	14	43					
1987	10	208	Bill Sedergren	United States	D										
1987	11	229	Peter Hasselblad	Sweden	D										
1987	12	250	Magnus Svensson	Sweden	D	46	4	14	18	31					
1987	S	20	Peter Lappin	United States	RW	7	0	0	0	2					
1988	1	21	Jason Muzzatti	Canada	G	62	0	1	1	62	13	25	10	—	3.32
1988	2	42	Todd Harkins	United States	C	48	3	3	6	78					
1988	4	84	Gary Socha	United States	C										
1988	5	85	Tomas Forslund	Sweden	RW	44	5	11	16	12					
1988	5	90	Scott Matusovich	United States	D										
1988	6	126	Jonas Bergqvist	Sweden	RW	22	2	5	7	10					
1988	7	147	Stefan Nilsson	Sweden	LW										
1988	8	168	Troy Kennedy	Canada	LW										
1988	9	189	Brett Petersen	United States	D										
1988	10	210	Guy Darveau	Canada	D										
1988	11	231	Dave Tretowicz	United States	D										
1988	12	252	Sergei Pryakhin	Russia	RW	46	3	8	11	2					
1988	S	26	Jerry Tarrant	United States	D										
1989	2	24	Kent Manderville	Canada	C	646	37	67	104	348					
1989	2	42	Ted Drury	United States	C	414	41	52	93	367					
1989	3	50	Veli-Pekka Kautonen	Finland	D										
1989	3	63	Corey Lyons	Canada	RW										
1989	4	70	Robert Reichel	Czech Republic	C	830	252	378	630	388					
1989	4	84	Ryan O'Leary	United States	C										
1989	5	105	Toby Kearney	United States	LW										
1989	7	147	Alex Nikolic	Canada	LW										
1989	8	168	Kevin Wortman	United States	D	5	0	0	0	2					
1989	9	189	Sergey Gomolyako	Russia	RW										
1989	10	210	Dan Sawyer	United States	D										
1989	11	231	Alexander Yudin	Russia	D										
1989	12	252	Kenneth Kennholt	Sweden	D										
1989	S	26	Shawn Heaphy	Canada	C	1	0	0	0	2					
1990	1	11	Trevor Kidd	Canada	G	387	0	13	13	36	140	162	52	—	2.84
1990	2	26	Nicolas Perreault	Canada	D										
1990	2	32	Vesa Viitakoski	Finland	LW	23	2	4	6	8					
1990	2	41	Etienne Belzile	Canada	D										
1990	3	62	Glen Mears	United States	D										
1990	4	83	Paul Kruse	Canada	LW	423	38	33	71	1074					
1990	6	125	Chris Tschupp	United States	LW										
1990	7	146	Dmitri Frolov	Russia	D										
1990	8	167	Shawn Murray	United States	G										
1990	9	188	Michael Murray	United States	RW										
1990	10	209	Rob Sumner	Canada	D										
1990	12	251	Leo Gudas	Czech Republic	D										
1990	S	25	Lyle Wildgoose	Canada	LW										
1991	1	19	Niklas Sundblad	Sweden	RW	2	0	0	0	0					
1991	2	41	Francois Groleau	Canada	D	8	0	1	1	6					
1991	3	52	Sandy McCarthy	Canada	RW	736	72	76	148	1534					
1991	3	63	Brian Caruso	Canada	LW										
1991	4	85	Steve Magnusson	United States	C										
1991	5	107	Jerome Butler	United States	G										
1991	6	129	Bob Marshall	Canada	D										
1991	7	140	Matt Hoffman	United States	C										
1991	7	151	Kelly Harper	Canada	RW										
1991	8	173	David St. Pierre	Canada	C										
1991	9	195	David Struch	Canada	C	4	0	0	0	4					
1991	10	217	Sergei Zolotov	Russia	LW										
1991	11	239	Marko Jantunen	Finland	RW	3	0	0	0	0					
1991	12	261	Andrei Trefilov	Russia	G	54	0	0	0	10	12	25	4	—	3.45
1991	S	25	Dean Larson	Canada	C										
1992	1	6	Cory Stillman	Canada	C	1025	278	449	727	489					
1992	2	30	Chris O'Sullivan	United States	D	62	2	17	19	16					
1992	3	54	Mathias Johansson	Sweden	LW	58	5	10	15	16					
1992	4	78	Robert Svehla	Slovakia	D	655	68	267	335	649					
1992	5	102	Sami Helenius	Finland	D	155	2	4	6	260					
1992	6	126	Ravil Yakubov	Russia	D										
1992	6	129	Joel Bouchard	Canada	D	364	22	53	75	264					
1992	7	150	Pavel Rajnoha	Czech Republic	D										
1992	8	174	Ryan Mulhern	United States	RW	3	0	0	0	0					
1992	9	198	Brandon Carper	United States	D										
1992	10	222	Jonas Hoglund	Sweden	LW	545	117	145	262	112					
1992	11	246	Andrei Potaichuk	Russia	RW										
1992	S	6	Jamie O'Brien	United States	D										
1993	1	18	Jesper Mattsson	Sweden	RW										
1993	2	44	Jamie Allison	Canada	D	372	7	23	30	639					
1993	3	70	Dan Tompkins	United States	F										
1993	4	95	Jason Smith	Canada	D										
1993	4	96	Marty Murray	Canada	C	261	31	42	73	41					
1993	5	121	Darryl LaFrance	Canada	RW										
1993	5	122	John Emmons	United States	C	85	2	4	6	64					
1993	6	148	Andreas Karlsson	Sweden	C	264	16	35	51	72					
1993	8	200	Derek Sylvester	United States	RW										
1993	10	252	German Titov	Russia	C	624	157	220	377	311					
1993	11	278	Burke Murphy	Canada	RW										
1994	1	19	Chris Dingman	Canada	LW	385	15	19	34	769					
1994	2	45	Dmitri Ryabykin	Russia	D										
1994	3	77	Chris Clark	United States	RW	607	103	111	214	700					
1994	4	91	Ryan Duthie	Canada	C										
1994	4	97	Johan Finnstrom	Sweden	D										
1994	5	107	Nils Ekman	Sweden	RW	264	60	91	151	188					
1994	5	123	Frank Appel	Germany	D										
1994	6	149	Patrik Haltia	Sweden	G										
1994	7	175	Ladislav Kohn	Czech Republic	RW	186	14	28	42	125					
1994	8	201	Keith McCambridge	Canada	D										
1994	9	227	Jorgen Jonsson	Sweden	C	81	12	19	31	16					
1994	10	253	Mike Peluso	United States	RW	38	4	2	6	19					
1994	11	279	Pavel Torgayev	Russia	C	55	6	14	20	20					
1995	1	20	Denis Gauthier	Canada	D	554	17	60	77	748					
1995	2	46	Pavel Smirnov	Russia	C										
1995	3	72	Rocky Thompson	Canada	RW	25	0	0	0	117					
1995	4	98	Jan Labraaten	Sweden	RW										
1995	6	150	Clarke Wilm	Canada	C	455	37	60	97	336					
1995	7	176	Ryan Gillis	Canada	D										
1995	9	233	Steve Shirreffs	United States	D										
1996	1	13	Derek Morris	Canada	D	1107	92	332	424	1004					
1996	2	39	Travis Brigley	Canada	LW	55	3	6	9	16					
1996	2	40	Steve Begin	Canada	C	524	56	52	108	561					
1996	3	73	Dmitri Vlasenkov	Russia	LW										
1996	4	89	Toni Lydman	Finland	D	847	36	206	242	551					
1996	4	94	Christian Lefebvre	Canada	D										
1996	5	122	Josef Straka	Czech Republic	C										
1996	8	202	Ryan Wade	Canada	RW/C										
1996	9	228	Ronald Petrovicky	Slovakia	RW	342	41	51	92	429					
1997	1	6	Daniel Tkaczuk	Canada	C	19	4	7	11	14					
1997	2	32	Evan Lindsay	Canada	G										
1997	2	42	John Tripp	Canada	RW	43	2	7	9	35					
1997	2	51	Dmitry Kokorev	Russia	D										
1997	3	60	Derek Schultz	Canada	C										
1997	3	70	Erik Andersson	Sweden	LW	12	2	1	3	8					
1997	4	92	Chris St. Croix	United States	D										
1997	4	100	Ryan Ready	Canada	LW	7	0	1	1	0					
1997	5	113	Martin Moise	Canada	RW										
1997	6	140	Ilja Demidov	Russia	D										
1997	7	167	Jeremy Rondeau	Canada	LW										
1997	9	223	Dustin Paul	Canada	RW										
1998	1	6	Rico Fata	Canada	RW	230	27	36	63	104					
1998	2	33	Blair Betts	Canada	C	477	41	37	78	118					
1998	3	62	Paul Manning	Canada	D	8	0	0	0	2					
1998	4	102	Shaun Sutter	Canada	RW										
1998	4	108	Dany Sabourin	Canada	G	57	0	1	1	4	17	23	2	4	2.87
1998	5	120	Brent Gauvreau	Canada	RW										
1998	7	192	Radek Duda	Czech Republic	RW										
1998	8	206	Jonas Frogren	Sweden	D	41	1	6	7	28					
1998	9	234	Kevin Mitchell	United States	D										
1999	1	11	Oleg Saprykin	Russia	LW	325	55	82	137	240					
1999	2	38	Dan Cavanaugh	United States	C										
1999	3	77	Craig Anderson	United States	G	709	0	20	20	56	319	275	2	73	2.86
1999	4	106	Rail Rozakov	Russia	D										
1999	5	135	Matt Doman	United States	RW										
1999	6	153	Jesse Cook	United States	D										
1999	6	166	Cory Pecker	Canada	D										
1999	6	170	Matt Underhill	Canada	G	1	0	0	0	0	0	1	0	0	3.93
1999	7	190	Blair Stayzer	Canada	LW										
1999	9	252	Dmitri Kirilenko	Canada	RW										
2000	1	9	Brent Krahn	Canada	G	1	0	0	0	0	0	1	0	0	3.00
2000	2	40	Kurtis Foster	Canada	D	405	42	118	160	308					
2000	2	46	Jarret Stoll	Canada	C	872	144	244	388	618					
2000	4	116	Levente Szuper	Hungary	G										
2000	5	141	Wade Davis	Canada	D										
2000	5	155	Travis Moen	Canada	LW/RW	747	59	77	136	801					
2000	6	176	Jukka Hentunen	Finland	RW	38	4	5	9	4					
2000	8	239	David Hajek	Czech Republic	D										
2000	9	270	Micki DuPont	Canada	D	23	1	3	4	12					
2001	1	14	Chuck Kobasew	Canada	RW	601	110	100	210	394					
2001	2	41	Andrei Taratukhin	Russia	C										
2001	2	56	Andrei Medvedev	Russia	G										
2001	4	108	Tomi Maki	Finland	RW	1	0	0	0	0					
2001	4	124	Egor Shastin	Russia	LW										
2001	5	145	James Hakewill	United States	D										
2001	5	164	Yuri Trubachev	Russia	C										
2001	7	207	Garrett Bembridge	Canada	RW										
2001	7	220	David Moss	United States	RW	501	78	100	178	157					
2001	8	233	Joe Campbell	United States	D										
2001	8	251	Ville Hamalainen	Finland	RW										
2002	1	10	Eric Nystrom	United States	LW	593	72	48	123	401					
2002	2	39	Brian McConnell	United States	F										
2002	3	90	Matthew Lombardi	Canada	C	536	101	161	262	293					
2002	4	112	Yuri Artemenkov	Russia	RW										
2002	5	141	Jiri Cetkovsky	Czech Republic	RW										
2002	5	142	Emanuel Peter	Switzerland	C										
2002	5	146	Viktor Bobrov	Russia	W/C										
2002	5	159	Kristofer Persson	Sweden	RW										
2002	6	176	Curtis McElhinney	Canada	G	249	0	4	4	4	94	85	0	20	2.83
2002	7	202	David Van der Gulik	Canada	RW	49	2	11	13	10					
2002	7	207	Pierre Johnsson	Sweden	RW										
2002	8	238	Jyri Marttinen	Finland	D										
2003	1	9	Dion Phaneuf	Canada	D	1048	137	357	494	1345					
2003	2	39	Tim Ramholt	Switzerland	D	1	0	0	0	0					
2003	3	97	Ryan Donally	Canada	LW										
2003	4	112	Jamie Tardif	Canada	RW	2	0	0	0	0					
2003	5	143	Greg Moore	United States	RW	10	0	0	0	0					
2003	6	173	Tyler Johnson	Canada	C										
2003	7	206	Thomas Bellemare	Canada	D										
2003	8	240	Cam Cunning	Canada	LW										
2003	9	270	Kevin Harvey	Canada	LW										
2004	1	24	Kris Chucko	Canada	LW	2	0	0	0	2					
2004	3	70	Brandon Prust	Canada	LW	486	40	75	115	1036					
2004	3	98	Dustin Boyd	Canada	C	220	32	31	63	41					
2004	4	118	Aki Seitsonen	Finland	C										
2004	4	121	Kris Hogg	Canada	LW										
2004	6	173	Adam Pardy	Canada	D	342	4	48	52	269					
2004	6	182	Fred Wikner	Sweden	RW										
2004	7	200	Matthew Schneider	Canada	C										
2004	7	213	James Spratt	United States	G										
2004	9	279	Adam Cracknell	Canada	RW	210	21	22	43	46					
2005	1	26	Matt Pelech	Canada	D	13	1	3	4	38					
2005	3	69	Gord Baldwin	Canada	D										
2005	3	74	Dan Ryder	Canada	C										
2005	4	111	J. D. Watt	Canada	RW										
2005	5	128	Kevin Lalande	Canada	G										
2005	5	158	Matt Keetley	Canada	G	1	0	0	0	0	0	0	0	0	0.00
2005	6	179	Brett Sutter	Canada	LW/C	60	2	8	10	40					
2005	7	221	Myles Rumsey	Canada	D										
2006	1	26	Leland Irving	Canada	G	13	0	1	1	0	3	4	0	4	3.25
2006	3	87	John Armstrong	Canada	C										
2006	3	89	Aaron Marvin	United States	C										
2006	4	118	Hugo Carpentier	Canada	C										
2006	5	149	Juuso Puustinen	Finland	RW										
2006	6	179	Jordan Fulton	United States	C										
2006	7	187	Devin DiDiomete	Canada	LW										
2006	7	209	Per Johnsson	Sweden	D										
2007	1	24	Mikael Backlund	Sweden	C	1148	232	374	606	503					
2007	3	70	John Negrin	Canada	D	3	0	1	1	2					
2007	4	116	Keith Aulie	Canada	D	167	4	10	14	196					
2007	5	143	Mickey Renaud	Canada	C										
2007	7	186	C. J. Severyn	United States	LW										
2008	1	25	Greg Nemisz	Canada	C/RW	15	0	1	1	0					
2008	2	48	Mitch Wahl	United States	C										
2008	3	78	Lance Bouma	Canada	C/LW	357	30	46	76	210					
2008	4	108	Nick Larson	United States	LW										
2008	4	114	T. J. Brodie	Canada	D	962	58	300	358	312					
2008	6	168	Ryley Grantham	Canada	C										
2008	7	198	Alexander Deilert	Sweden	D										
2009	1	23	Tim Erixon	Sweden	D	93	2	12	14	38					
2009	3	74	Ryan Howse	Canada	LW										
2009	4	111	Henrik Bjorklund	Sweden	RW										
2009	5	141	Spencer Bennett	Canada	LW										
2009	6	171	Joni Ortio	Finland	G	37	0	2	2	2	15	15	0	5	2.66
2009	7	201	Gaelan Patterson	Canada	C										
2010	3	64	Max Reinhart	Canada	C	23	1	4	5	6					
2010	3	73	Joey Leach	Canada	D										
2010	4	103	John Ramage	United States	D	2	0	0	0	0					
2010	4	108	Bill Arnold	United States	C	1	0	0	0	0					
2010	5	133	Micheal Ferland	Canada	LW	335	60	74	134	200					
2010	7	193	Patrick Holland	Canada	RW	5	0	0	0	0					
2011	1	13	Sven Bartschi	Switzerland	LW	292	66	72	138	78					
2011	2	45	Markus Granlund	Finland	C	335	58	43	101	86					
2011	2	57	Tyler Wotherspoon	Canada	D	30	0	5	5	4					
2011	4	104	Johnny Gaudreau	United States	LW	763	243	500	743	176					
2011	6	164	Laurent Brossoit	Canada	G	141	0	1	1	2	64	47	0	13	2.66
2012	1	21	Mark Jankowski	Canada	C	482	79	66	145	144					
2012	2	42	Patrick Sieloff	United States	D	2	2	0	2	2					
2012	3	75	Jon Gillies	United States	G	35	0	1	1	2	8	16	0	3	3.39
2012	4	105	Brett Kulak	Canada	D	663	29	108	137	276					
2012	5	124	Ryan Culkin	Canada	D										
2012	6	165	Coda Gordon	Canada	LW										
2012	7	186	Matthew Deblouw	United States	C										
2013	1	6	Sean Monahan	Canada	C	896	276	355	631	213					
2013	1	22	Emile Poirier	Canada	RW	8	0	1	1	2					
2013	1	28	Morgan Klimchuk	Canada	LW	1	0	0	0	0					
2013	3	67	Keegan Kanzig	Canada	D										
2013	5	135	Eric Roy	Canada	D										
2013	6	157	Tim Harrison	United States	RW										
2013	7	187	Rushan Rafikov	Russia	D										
2013	7	198	John Gilmour	Canada	D	37	2	3	5	18					
2014	1	4	Sam Bennett	Canada	C	767	188	206	394	752					
2014	2	34	Mason McDonald	Canada	G										
2014	2	54	Hunter Smith	Canada	RW										
2014	3	64	Brandon Hickey	Canada	D										
2014	6	175	Adam Ollas Mattsson	Sweden	D										
2014	7	184	Austin Carroll	Canada	RW										
2015	2	53	Rasmus Andersson	Sweden	D	617	64	214	278	350					
2015	2	60	Oliver Kylington	Sweden	D	220	18	42	60	60					
2015	5	136	Pavel Karnaukhov	Belarus	C										
2015	6	166	Andrew Mangiapane	Canada	LW	560	131	128	259	247					
2015	7	196	Riley Bruce	Canada	D										
2016	1	6	Matthew Tkachuk	United States	LW	673	253	417	670	738					
2016	2	54	Tyler Parsons	United States	G										
2016	2	56	Dillon Dube	Canada	C	325	57	70	127	105					
2016	3	66	Adam Fox	United States	D	486	72	350	422	194					
2016	4	96	Linus Lindstrom	Sweden	C										
2016	5	126	Mitchell Mattson	United States	C										
2016	6	156	Eetu Tuulola	Finland	RW										
2016	6	166	Matthew Phillips	Canada	C/RW	34	1	4	5	2					
2016	7	186	Stepan Falkovsky	Belarus	D										
2017	1	16	Juuso Valimaki	Finland	D	271	11	61	72	133					
2017	4	109	Adam Ruzicka	Slovakia	C	117	14	26	40	32					
2017	5	140	Zach Fischer	Canada	RW										
2017	6	171	D'Artagnan Joly	Canada	RW										
2017	7	202	Filip Sveningsson	Sweden	LW										
2018	4	106	Martin Pospisil	Slovakia	C	166	13	39	52	210					
2018	4	108	Demetrios Koumontzis	United States	LW										
2018	4	122	Milos Roman	Slovakia	C										
2018	6	171	Mathias Emilio Pettersen	Norway	C										
2018	7	198	Dmitry Zavgorodniy	Russia	LW										
2019	1	26	Jakob Pelletier	Canada	LW	91	11	18	29	14					
2019	3	88	Ilya Nikolayev	Russia	C										
2019	4	116	Lucas Feuk	Sweden	C										
2019	5	150	Josh Nodler	United States	C										
2019	7	214	Dustin Wolf	United States	G	128	0	3	3	6	60	52	0	12	2.84
2020	1	24	Connor Zary	Canada	C	191	39	47	86	58					
2020	2	50	Yan Kuznetsov	Russia	D	58	4	8	12	28					
2020	3	72	Jeremie Poirier	Canada	D										
2020	3	80	Jake Boltmann	United States	D										
2020	4	96	Daniil Chechelev	Russia	G										
2020	5	143	Ryan Francis	Canada	C										
2020	6	174	Rory Kerins	Canada	C	9	0	4	4	2					
2020	7	205	Ilya Solovyov	Belarus	D	45	1	11	12	22					
2021	1	13	Matthew Coronato	United States	RW	192	45	56	101	63					
2021	2	45	William Strömgren	Sweden	LW	3	0	0	0	0					
2021	3	77	Cole Huckins	Canada	C										
2021	3	89	Cameron Whynot	Canada	D										
2021	5	141	Cole Jordan	Canada	D										
2021	6	168	Jack Beck	Canada	RW										
2021	6	173	Lucas Ciona	Canada	LW										
2021	7	205	Arseni Sergeyev	Russia	G	1	0	0	0	0	1	0	0	0	1.00
2022	2	59	Topi Ronni	Finland	C										
2022	5	155	Parker Bell	Canada	LW										
2022	7	219	Cade Littler	United States	C										
2023	1	16	Samuel Honzek	Slovakia	LW/C	23	2	2	4	4					
2023	2	48	Etienne Morin	Canada	D										
2023	3	80	Aydar Suniev	Russia	LW	7	0	1	1	2					
2023	4	112	Jaden Lipinski	United States	C										
2023	6	176	Yegor Yegorov	Russia	G										
2023	7	208	Axel Hurtig	Sweden	D										
2024	1	9	Zayne Parekh	Canada	D	38	5	5	10	10					
2024	1	28	Matvei Gridin	Russia	RW	37	6	14	20	2					
2024	2	41	Andrew Basha	Canada	LW										
2024	2	62	Jacob Battaglia	Canada	LW/RW										
2024	3	74	Henry Mews	Canada	D										
2024	3	84	Kirill Zarubin	Russia	G										
2024	4	106	Trevor Hoskin	Canada	C										
2024	5	150	Luke Misa	Canada	C										
2024	6	170	Hunter Laing	Canada	C/RW										
2024	6	177	Eric Jamieson	Canada	D										
2025	1	18	Cole Reschny	Canada	C										
2025	1	32	Cullen Potter	United States	C										
2025	2	54	Theo Stockselius	Sweden	C										
2025	3	80	Mace'o Phillips	United States	D										
2025	5	144	Ethan Wyttenbach	United States	RW										
2025	6	176	Aidan Lane	Canada	RW										
2025	7	208	Jakob Leander	Sweden	D										
2025	7	211	Yan Matveiko	Russia	C										
2026	1	6	Carson Carels	Canada	D										
2026	1	30	Jack Hextall	United States	C										
2026	2	36	Chase Harrington	Canada	LW										
2026	2	42	Tobias Trejbal	Czechia	G										
2026	2	55	Alan Shaikhlislamov	Russia	RW										
2026	3	65	Joe Iginla	Canada	RW										
2026	4	100	Egor Barabanov	Russia	C										
2026	5	132	Simon Katolicky	Czechia	LW										
2026	6	164	Bode Laylin	United States	D										

== See also ==
- List of Atlanta Flames draft picks
- List of NHL first overall draft choices
- List of undrafted NHL players with 100 games played
