= Al MacInnis =

Canadian ice hockey player (born 1963)

- Hockey Hall of Fame, 2007
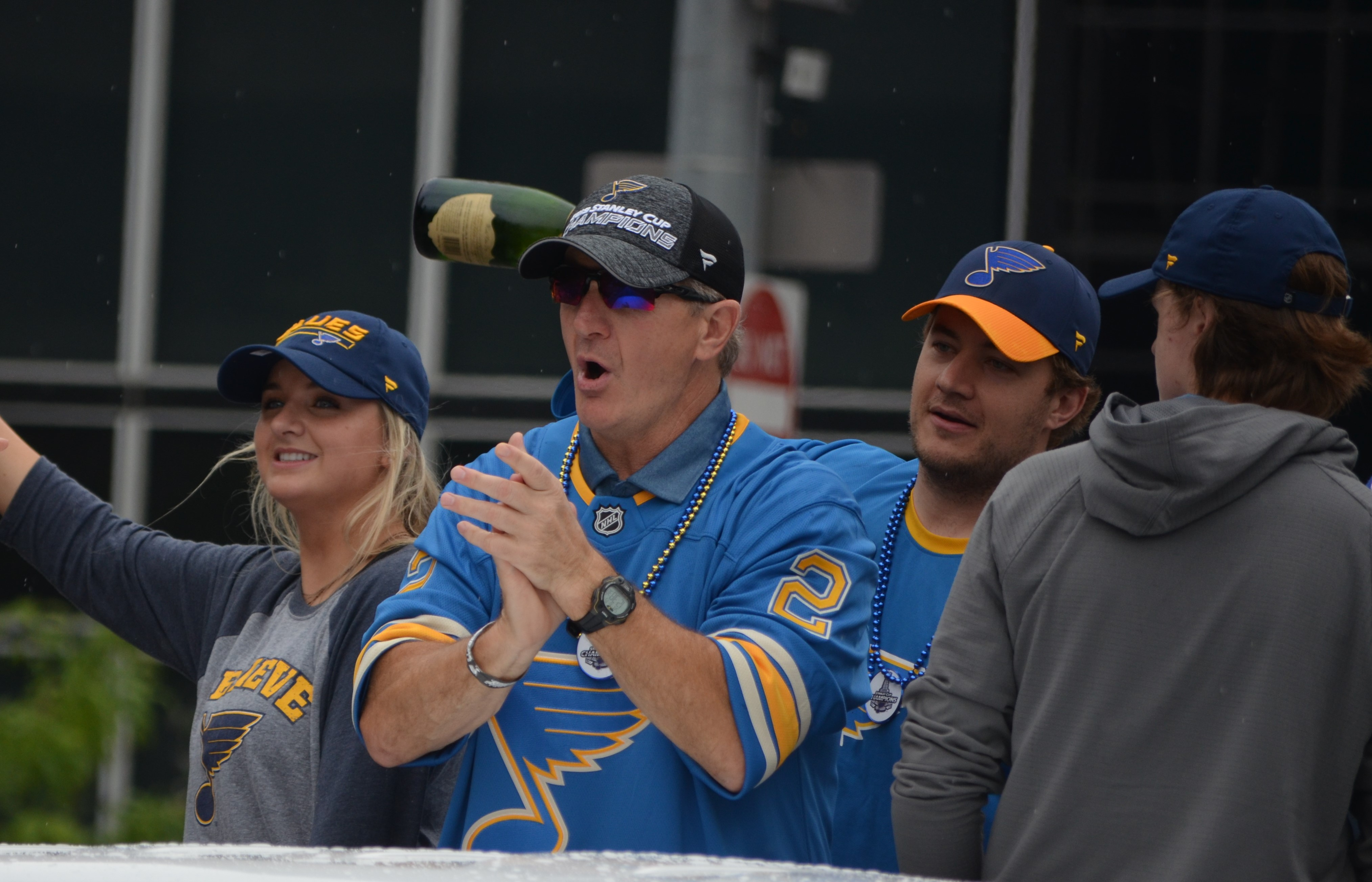
- MacInnis in 2019
- Born: July 11, 1963 (age 63) Inverness, Nova Scotia, Canada
- Height: 6 ft 2 in (188 cm)
- Weight: 204 lb (93 kg; 14 st 8 lb)
- Position: Defence
- Shot: Right
- Played for: Calgary Flames; St. Louis Blues
- National team: Canada
- NHL draft: 15th overall, 1981; Calgary Flames
- Playing career: 1981–2004
Medal record
Men's ice hockey
Representing Canada
Olympic Games
Gold medal – first place	2002 Salt Lake City	Ice hockey
Canada Cup
Gold medal – first place	1991 Canada

Allan MacInnis (born July 11, 1963) is a Canadian former professional ice hockey player who was a defenceman for 23 seasons in the National Hockey League (NHL) for the Calgary Flames (1981–1994) and St. Louis Blues (1994–2004). A first round selection of the Flames in the 1981 NHL entry draft, he went on to become a twelve-time All-Star. He was named the Conn Smythe Trophy winner as the most valuable player of the playoffs in 1989 after leading the Flames to the Stanley Cup championship. He was voted the winner of the James Norris Memorial Trophy in 1999 as the top defenceman in the league while a member of the Blues. In 2017, MacInnis was named one of the '100 Greatest NHL Players' in history.

MacInnis was most famous for having the hardest shot in the league. He tied Bobby Orr's Ontario Hockey League (OHL) record for goals by a defenceman, and won two OHL championships and a Memorial Cup with the Kitchener Rangers as a junior. He famously split goaltender Mike Liut's mask with a shot, and became only the fourth defenceman in NHL history to score 100 points in a season. Internationally, he was an all-star on defence as Canada won the 1991 Canada Cup and twice participated in the Winter Olympics. He was a member of the 2002 team that won Canada's first gold medal in 50 years.

An eye injury suffered early in the 2003–04 NHL season forced MacInnis into retirement. He finished his career third all-time among defencemen in goals, assists and points and was named to seven postseason all-star teams. He was elected to the Hockey Hall of Fame in 2007, and his jersey number 2 was retired by the Blues and is honoured by the Flames. MacInnis remains a member of the Blues organization, currently serving as the team's senior advisor to the general manager. When the Blues won the Stanley Cup in 2019, he got his name engraved on the Stanley Cup for a second time.

== Early life ==
MacInnis was born in Inverness, Nova Scotia, and grew up in nearby Port Hood, a fishing village on Cape Breton Island. He is the seventh of eight children born to Alex and Anna Mae MacInnis, and one of six brothers. His father worked as a coal miner and later as the assistant manager of the arena in Port Hood when the mine closed while his mother was a school teacher. The brothers all played hockey in Port Hawkesbury during the winter. MacInnis often assisted his father's work at the arena, collecting pucks that he used to shoot repeatedly against a sheet of plywood set against the family barn during the summer. It was through this practice, which occasionally left him with blistered fingers, that he developed his powerful slapshot.

== Playing career ==
=== Junior ===
MacInnis left home in 1979 to join the Regina Pat Blues of the Saskatchewan Junior Hockey League (SJHL). He appeared in 59 games, scoring 20 goals and 48 points with the Pat Blues, and appeared in two Western Hockey League (WHL) games with the Regina Pats. He then moved to Ontario and joined the Kitchener Rangers of the Ontario Hockey League (OHL). Following a season in which he scored 39 points in 47 games and winning the League Championship with Kitchener in the 1980–81 OHL season, MacInnis was rated as the second best defensive prospect at the 1981 NHL entry draft. He was selected by the Calgary Flames in the first round, 15th overall. The Flames invited him to their training camp, although they did not expect him to play for them immediately, and he was returned to junior.

Most of his season was spent with Kitchener where MacInnis was named to the OHL first All-Star team after scoring 75 points for the Rangers. The team won its second consecutive OHL title, and captured the 1982 Memorial Cup. He played a third season in Kitchener in 1982–83, and was again named a first-team All-Star after an 84-point season. Additionally, MacInnis was voted the winner of the Max Kaminsky Trophy as the OHL's top defenceman. He tied Bobby Orr's OHL record for goals by a defenceman in one season with 38 (subsequently broken by Bryan Fogarty's 47 in 1988–89), and holds the Canadian Hockey League record of five goals in one game by a defenceman.

=== Calgary Flames ===
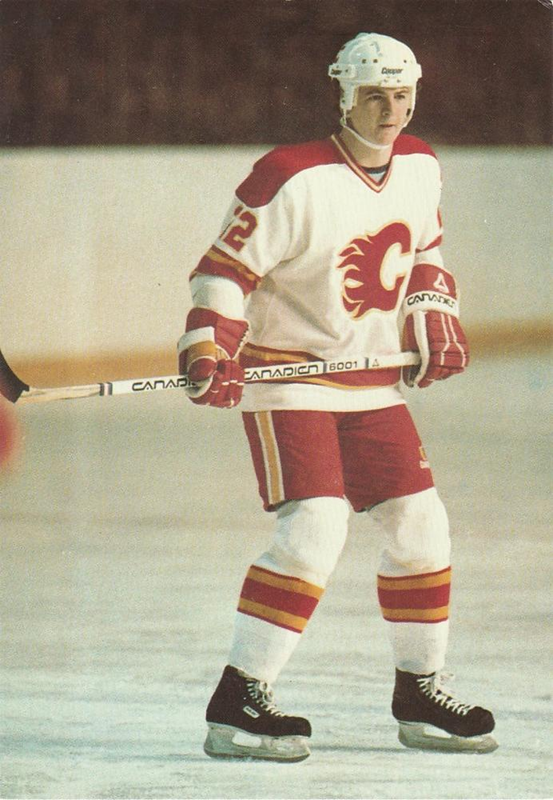
MacInnis with the Calgary Flames c. 1982

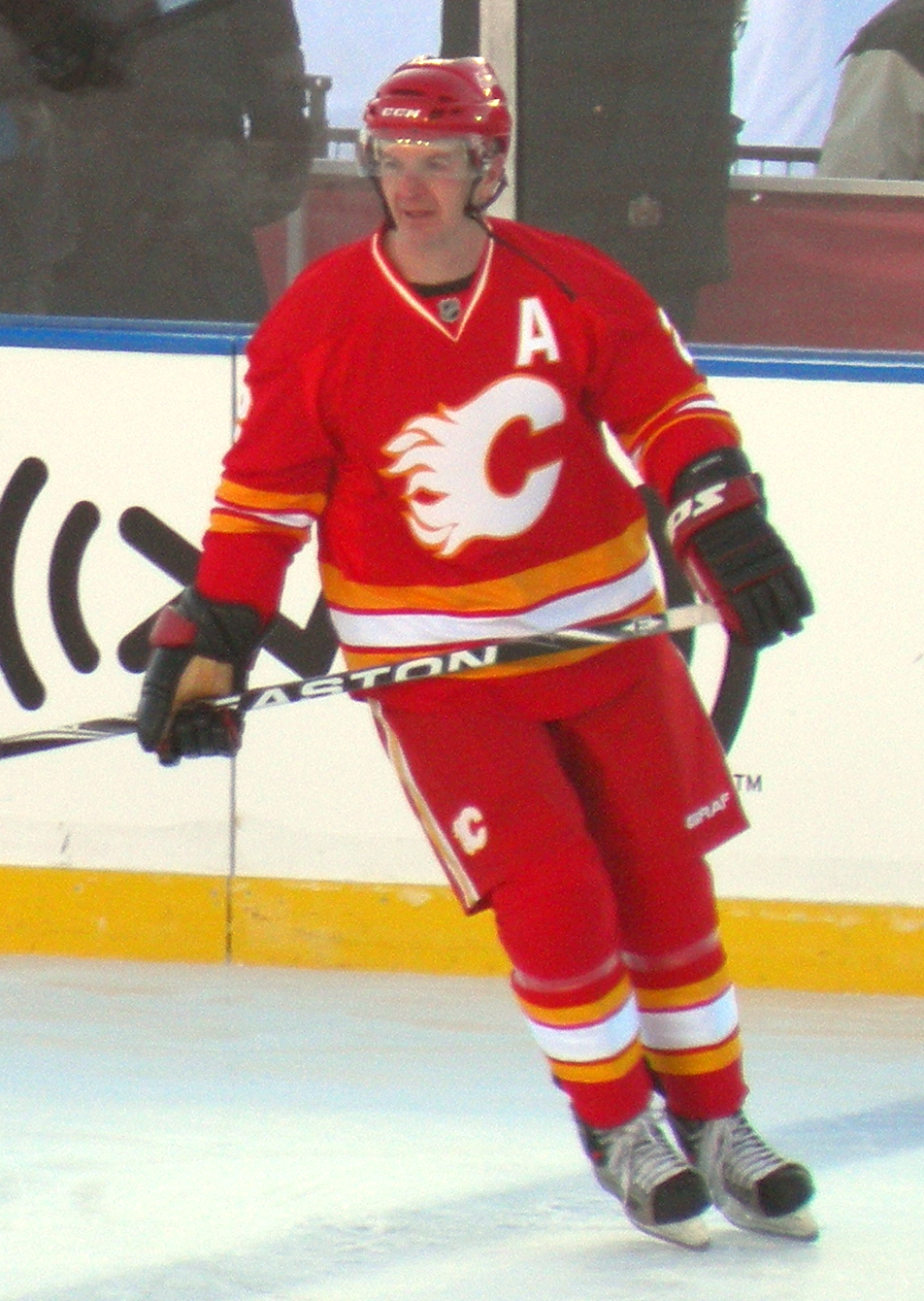
MacInnis at the 2011 NHL Heritage Classic Alumni Game

MacInnis made his NHL debut with the Flames on December 30, 1981, against the Boston Bruins. He appeared in two games that season, and an additional fourteen in 1982–83 in seasons spent primarily with Kitchener at the junior level. He scored his first NHL point against the Toronto Maple Leafs on October 23, 1982. MacInnis began the 1983–84 season with the Colorado Flames of the Central Hockey League, scoring 19 points in 19 games before joining Calgary full-time. With the Flames, he scored 11 goals and 34 assists in 51 games and appeared in his first 11 postseason games during the 1984 Stanley Cup playoffs.

A point-per-game pace in 1984–85 (66 points in 67 games) earned MacInnis his first All-Star Game appearance, playing in front of his hometown fans at the 1985 game in Calgary. He was voted a second-team All-Star for the 1986–87 NHL season, and started his first All-Star Game in 1988. He was a finalist for the James Norris Memorial Trophy as top defenceman in the league in three consecutive seasons, 1989, 1990 and 1991, but failed to win the award each time.

Led by MacInnis' 31 points, the Flames won the first Stanley Cup championship in their history in 1989. He had four goals and five assists in six games in the Stanley Cup Final series against the Montreal Canadiens en route to winning the Conn Smythe Trophy as the most valuable player of the playoffs. MacInnis became the first defenceman to lead the league in postseason scoring, and he finished with a 17-game scoring streak, the longest by a defenceman in NHL history.

MacInnis finished second amongst NHL defencemen in scoring in 1989–90 with 90 points and was named a First Team All-Star for the first time. He improved to a career high 103 points the following year, becoming the first Flames' defenceman and only the fourth in NHL history to record a 100-point season. He scored his 563rd career point in a January 8, 1991, game against Toronto, to surpass Kent Nilsson as the franchise's all-time scoring leader. MacInnis missed three months of the 1992–93 season when he suffered a dislocated hip during a game on November 11, 1992, against the Hartford Whalers. While chasing a puck at high speed, he lost control and crashed into the end boards after Hartford rookie Patrick Poulin shoved MacInnis with his stick. Three weeks after his return to action, on February 23, 1993, MacInnis set a Flames franchise record when he appeared in his 706th career game.

Following five consecutive seasons where the Flames failed to advance past the first round of the playoffs, both MacInnis and the team were looking for a change in the summer of 1994. Though the Flames made an offer of C$2.5 million per season for MacInnis, he instead signed an offer sheet with the St. Louis Blues for US$3.5 million a season for four years, making him the fourth highest-paid player in the NHL. As MacInnis was a restricted free agent, the Blues sent defenceman Phil Housley and two second round draft picks to the Flames in compensation while also receiving a fourth round selection back.

MacInnis said his decision to leave Calgary was not easy to make given his family was from the city. He claimed money was not the only reason he signed with the Blues, stating that he wanted a new challenge. He left Calgary after 11 full NHL seasons as the franchise's all-time leader in scoring with 822 points, and led in assists (603), games played (803), playoff assists (77) and playoff points (103). He appeared in six All-Star Games with Calgary and was named a league all-star five times: twice on the first team and three times on the second. The team honoured MacInnis as the first player inducted into their "Forever a Flame" program in 2012. His jersey number 2 was raised to the Saddledome rafters on February 27, 2012, but was not formally retired.

=== St. Louis Blues ===
Pneumonia and a late-season shoulder injury limited MacInnis to 28 points in 32 games in 1994–95, a season itself reduced to 48 games by a labour dispute. While he returned to play in the postseason, MacInnis required off-season surgery to repair the damage to his shoulder. He returned to health in 1995–96, appearing in all 82 games for the Blues. Early in his third season with the Blues, MacInnis played his 1,000th game in an October 23, 1997, match-up against the Vancouver Canucks. However he again suffered a separation of his surgically repaired shoulder in December 1997, an injury that forced him out of the Blues line-up for three weeks.

MacInnis scored a goal and an assist in a 5–3 loss to the Detroit Red Wings on April 7, 1998, to become just the sixth defenceman in NHL history to score 1,000 points. After coming close several times, MacInnis finally won the Norris Trophy as the league's top defenceman in 1998–99. Early in the 2000–01 season, MacInnis recorded four assists in a 5–2 victory over the Florida Panthers to set a Blues franchise record for scoring by a defenceman. He reached the mark with his 300th point, scored in his 424th game with the organization.

When Chris Pronger broke his arm early in the 2002–03 NHL season, MacInnis was named interim captain for the remainder of the season. He completed the season as the league's leader in scoring amongst defencemen with 68 points. Pronger insisted that MacInnis remain captain permanently when he returned for the 2003–04 season. MacInnis played only three games that season as vision problems he suffered during an October 2003 game against the Nashville Predators were diagnosed as being the result of a detached retina in one eye – the same eye in which he suffered a serious injury after being struck by a high stick in 2001. He missed the remainder of the season as a result, and after the 2004–05 NHL season was cancelled due to a labour dispute, MacInnis felt that he could not return to the game at a high enough level to compete.

MacInnis announced his retirement as a player on September 9, 2005, but remained with the Blues organization as part of its marketing and hockey operations departments. Ending his career with 1,274 points, MacInnis ranked third all-time in goals, assists and points amongst defencemen, and played in six additional All-Star Games as a member of the Blues. The team retired his jersey number 2 on April 9, 2006, and honoured him with a bronze statue out front of the Scottrade Center in 2009. MacInnis was inducted to the Hockey Hall of Fame in 2007. He was the first player from Nova Scotia so honoured, and was also inducted into the Nova Scotia Sport Hall of Fame and the St. Louis Sports Hall of Fame.

=== International ===
MacInnis was a member of the Canadian national team on four occasions. He first represented Canada at the 1990 Men's World Ice Hockey Championships where he scored one goal and four points. One year later, he played in his only Canada Cup tournament. He scored two goals and four assists and was named a tournament all-star as Canada won the title over the United States. He suffered a separated shoulder shortly before the 1998 Winter Olympics, and while it was feared he would be unavailable for the tournament as a result, recovered in time to be cleared to play. MacInnis scored two goals during the tournament, but Canada finished in fourth place after losing the bronze medal match to Finland following a semi-final loss to the Czech Republic. MacInnis also participated in the 2002 Winter Olympics. Though he scored no points in the tournament, Canada defeated the United States to win the nation's first gold medal in hockey in 50 years.

== Playing style ==
"There's hard and then there's Al MacInnis hard. I tried to get out of the way. If it happens too often, you have to sit down and re-evaluate what you're doing with your life."

— Goaltender Mike Liut talking about MacInnis' slapshot

MacInnis was best known for the power and accuracy of his slapshot. The Flames selected him in the 1981 Draft on the strength of his shot alone; his skating ability was so poor when he arrived for his first training camp in Calgary he earned the nickname "Chopper". While some reporters expected he would be a bust as a result, MacInnis said the patience the Flames showed him in his early days as a professional allowed him to develop into a more complete defenceman.

The power of his shot grew into legend on January 17, 1984, in a game against St. Louis. In his first full season with the Flames, MacInnis took a slapshot from just outside the Blues' defensive zone that struck goaltender Mike Liut on the mask. The shot split Liut's helmet while the puck fell into the net for a goal. The power of his shot, and the fear it inspired in his opposition, led to MacInnis' success as an offensive-defenceman, especially as a threat on the power play. MacInnis resisted the transition to carbon-fiber sticks in the late 1990s and early 2000s. The new stick technology offering better flexing characteristics and increased shot speed, but MacInnis preferred the feel of traditional wooden sticks. He continued to win "Hardest Shot" events at All-Star Game skills competitions despite competing with the technologically inferior wooden sticks. He won the event a total of seven times between 1991 and 2003. He occasionally topped 100 miles per hour (160 km/h), including his win in the 2000 All-Star Game.

Used primarily as a power play specialist in his first years as a professional, MacInnis worked at improving his overall game such that he was named a Norris Trophy finalist three consecutive seasons between 1989 and 1991, and was the runner-up to Ray Bourque in 1991. He finally won the Norris Trophy as the league's top defenceman in 1999 with the Blues. Former teammate Doug Gilmour praised MacInnis' passing ability. MacInnis's play developed to the point where he was as valued for his defensive ability on the penalty kill as he was for his offence on the power play.

== Off the ice ==
MacInnis married his wife Jackie shortly after winning the Stanley Cup in 1989, and the couple have four children, Carson, Ryan, Lauren and Riley. MacInnis settled in St. Louis following his retirement, and in 2006 was named the Blues' Vice-President of Hockey Operations. He coaches his children's minor hockey teams, and in 2008–09 coached the St. Louis Junior AAA Blues to a 73–3–2 record and the championship title at the 50th Quebec International Pee-Wee Hockey Tournament. His son Ryan was a member of the Kitchener Rangers, and was drafted by the Arizona Coyotes in the 2014 NHL entry draft. His daughter Lauren played ice hockey at Northeastern University.

Though his career took him away from Nova Scotia, MacInnis remains involved with his hometown. In 2001, he committed C$100,000 towards a major renovation of the Port Hood Arena. The arena was renamed the Al MacInnis Sports Centre in his honour, and he hosts an annual golf tournament to help raise funds for the arena commission. On the day he was inducted into the Nova Scotia Sport Hall of Fame, he donated $100,000 to the Inverness County Memorial Hospital in the memory of his parents.

In 2018, he finished third to hockey superstar Sidney Crosby and curler Colleen Jones in a listing of the greatest 15 athletes in Nova Scotia's history.

== Career statistics ==
=== Regular season and playoffs ===
			Regular season					Playoffs
Season	Team	League	GP	G	A	Pts	PIM	GP	G	A	Pts	PIM
1979–80	Regina Pat Blues	SJHL	59	20	28	48	110	—	—	—	—	—
1979–80	Regina Pats	WHL	2	0	0	0	0	—	—	—	—	—
1980–81	Kitchener Rangers	OHL	47	11	28	39	59	18	4	12	16	20
1981–82	Calgary Flames	NHL	2	0	0	0	0	—	—	—	—	—
1981–82	Kitchener Rangers	OHL	59	25	50	75	145	15	5	10	15	44
1982–83	Kitchener Rangers	OHL	51	38	46	84	67	8	3	8	11	9
1982–83	Calgary Flames	NHL	14	1	3	4	9	—	—	—	—	—
1983–84	Colorado Flames	CHL	19	5	14	19	22	—	—	—	—	—
1983–84	Calgary Flames	NHL	51	11	34	45	42	11	2	12	14	13
1984–85	Calgary Flames	NHL	67	14	52	66	75	4	1	2	3	8
1985–86	Calgary Flames	NHL	77	11	57	68	76	21	4	15	19	30
1986–87	Calgary Flames	NHL	79	20	56	76	97	4	1	0	1	0
1987–88	Calgary Flames	NHL	80	25	58	83	114	7	3	6	9	18
1988–89	Calgary Flames	NHL	79	16	58	74	126	22	7	24	31	46
1989–90	Calgary Flames	NHL	79	28	62	90	82	6	2	3	5	8
1990–91	Calgary Flames	NHL	78	28	75	103	90	7	2	3	5	8
1991–92	Calgary Flames	NHL	72	20	57	77	83	—	—	—	—	—
1992–93	Calgary Flames	NHL	50	11	43	54	61	6	1	6	7	10
1993–94	Calgary Flames	NHL	75	28	54	82	95	7	2	6	8	12
1994–95	St. Louis Blues	NHL	32	8	20	28	43	7	1	5	6	10
1995–96	St. Louis Blues	NHL	82	17	44	61	88	13	3	4	7	20
1996–97	St. Louis Blues	NHL	72	13	30	43	65	6	1	2	3	4
1997–98	St. Louis Blues	NHL	71	19	30	49	80	8	2	6	8	12
1998–99	St. Louis Blues	NHL	82	20	42	62	70	13	4	8	12	20
1999–00	St. Louis Blues	NHL	61	11	28	39	34	7	1	3	4	14
2000–01	St. Louis Blues	NHL	59	12	42	54	52	15	2	8	10	18
2001–02	St. Louis Blues	NHL	71	11	35	46	52	10	0	7	7	4
2002–03	St. Louis Blues	NHL	80	16	52	68	61	3	0	1	1	0
2003–04	St. Louis Blues	NHL	3	0	2	2	6	—	—	—	—	—
NHL totals			1,416	340	934	1,274	1,501	177	39	121	160	255

=== International ===
Year	Team	Event	GP	G	A	Pts	PIM
1990	Canada	WC	9	1	3	4	10
1991	Canada	CC	8	2	4	6	23
1998	Canada	OLY	6	2	0	2	2
2002	Canada	OLY	6	0	0	0	8
Senior totals			29	5	7	12	43

== Awards and honours ==
Junior
Award	Year	Ref.
Max Kaminsky Trophy	1982–83	
OHL first-team All-Star	1981–82; 1982–83	

National Hockey League
Award	Year	Ref.
First team All-Star	1989–90; 1990–91; 1998–99; 2002–03	
Second team All-Star	1986–87; 1988–89; 1993–94	
Conn Smythe Trophy	1989	
Stanley Cup champion	1989 (as player), 2019 (as executive)	
Ralph T. Scurfield Humanitarian Award; CGY – Support of humanitarian and charitable causes	1993–94	
James Norris Memorial Trophy	1998–99	

International
Award	Year	Ref.
Canada Cup All-Star team	1991	

== See also ==
- List of NHL statistical leaders
- List of NHL players with 1,000 games played
- List of NHL players with 1,000 points

Preceded by Denis Cyr	Calgary Flames first-round draft pick 1981	Succeeded by Dan Quinn
Preceded by Wayne Gretzky	Winner of the Conn Smythe Trophy; 1989	Succeeded by Bill Ranford
Preceded by Rob Blake	Winner of the James Norris Memorial Trophy; 1999	Succeeded by Chris Pronger
Preceded by Chris Pronger*	St. Louis Blues captain 2003–04*	Succeeded by Dallas Drake
