= Dan Quinn (ice hockey) =

Canadian ice hockey player and golfer

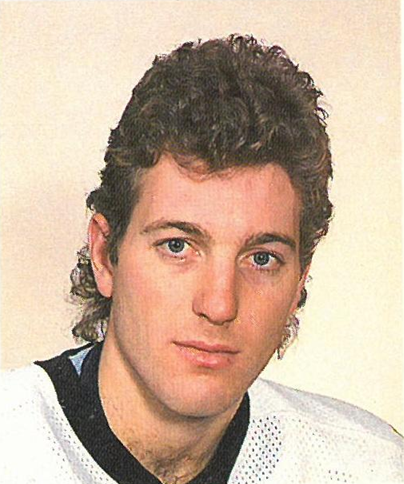
- Born: June 1, 1965 (age 61) Ottawa, Ontario, Canada
- Height: 5 ft 11 in (180 cm)
- Weight: 175 lb (79 kg; 12 st 7 lb)
- Position: Centre
- Shot: Left
- Played for: Calgary Flames; Pittsburgh Penguins; Vancouver Canucks; St. Louis Blues; Philadelphia Flyers; Minnesota North Stars; Ottawa Senators; Los Angeles Kings
- National team: Canada
- NHL draft: 13th overall, 1983; Calgary Flames
- Playing career: 1983–1996

Daniel Peter Quinn (born June 1, 1965) is a Canadian former professional ice hockey player and former professional golfer. Quinn played 14 seasons in the National Hockey League (NHL). Quinn was born in Ottawa, Ontario, but grew up in Brockville, Ontario.

== Ice hockey career ==
=== Calgary Flames ===
Quinn was drafted 13th overall by the Calgary Flames in the 1983 NHL entry draft, while he was playing for the Belleville Bulls of the Ontario Hockey League (OHL). Quinn made his debut with Calgary halfway through the next season, scoring 52 points in 54 games. When he was called up he had been leading the OHL in scoring with 59 points. During his third season with the Flames, he scored 30 goals and 72 points, and then added 15 more points in 18 playoff games as he advanced to the Stanley Cup Final where his Flames were defeated by the Montreal Canadiens. The next season, on November 12, 1986, Quinn was traded to the Pittsburgh Penguins for Mike Bullard.

=== Pittsburgh Penguins ===
In Pittsburgh, Quinn had the most success, scoring a career high 40 goals in 1987–88, and a career-high 94 points the next season. He was unable to duplicate the success the next year and after struggling with just 29 points in the first 41 games of the 1989-90 season he was on the move again.

=== Vancouver Canucks ===
Quinn was traded to the Vancouver Canucks in 1990 in a six-player swap and he scored at nearly a point-a-game clip after the deal. The following year his production slipped and by the trade deadline he was on the move again as the Canucks shipped him to St. Louis in a seven-player blockbuster trade.

=== St. Louis Blues ===
Quinn finished the year putting up 11 points in 14 games, then added 11 more in 13 playoff games for the Blues but it wasn't enough to secure him a spot in the lineup. After the season, the Blues lost veteran defenseman Harold Snespts to retirement and then lost their captain and top blue liner Scott Stevens as compensation for a free agent signing leaving a big hole on their defence. In an effort to fix this Quinn was packaged up with young forward Rod Brind'Amour and dealt to the Philadelphia Flyers in exchange for tough defenseman Murray Baron and centre Ron Sutter.

=== Philadelphia Flyers ===
While Brind'Amour was an immediate success in Philadelphia, leading the team in scoring, Quinn struggled to find the net and managed just 37 points in 67 games. This marked the worst production of his career and spelled the end for his time with the Flyers. Quinn failed to find a new club over the summer before finally signing a deal on the eve of the 1992-93 season with the Minnesota North Stars.

=== Minnesota North Stars ===
Quinn got off to a slow start with the North Stars with no-goals and just four assists in his first eleven games before his season - and his career - got derailed. Quinn was alleged to have raped a 19-year-old woman in a hotel room in Minnesota after a game with the Pittsburgh Penguins. Quinn maintained that he and the woman had sex, but that it was consensual. The police did not press charges, but the team released him from his contract, saying that he violated the team curfew on the night of the incident.

Unable to find an NHL team willing to take a chance on him, Quinn signed in Switzerland for the 1993-94 season, and finished just two points shy of leading the team in scoring despite playing eleven less games than the team leader. This production was enough to attract NHL attention once again.

=== Ottawa Senators ===
On March 15, 1994, with the season winding down, Quinn's hometown Ottawa Senators signed him to a free-agent deal and he paid immediate dividends, scoring 7 goals in 13 games with the club to finish the season.

=== Los Angeles Kings ===
Quinn signed a free-agent deal with the Los Angeles Kings, though an NHL lockout that delayed the start of the year allowed him to return to Switzerland for seven games before the NHL started up. With the Kings Quinn scored 31 points in 44 games, good for third on the team in scoring.

After the year, he was a free agent once again and once again signed a deal with his hometown club.

=== Ottawa Senators, second stint ===
Quinn once again was productive with the Senators, producing at close to a point per game for Ottawa. The Senators usual first-line centre, Alexei Yashin, was holding out for a new contract, pushing Quinn into a primary role where he delivered for the club. Quinn set a then-team record with a six-point game versus the Tampa Bay Lightning but despite all this, the Senators traded him to Philadelphia after just 28 games where he produced 24 points.

=== Philadelphia Flyers, second stint ===
Quinn's production dipped in Philadelphia with 22 points in 35 games despite the fact he was slotted in, briefly, on the Flyers top line with John LeClair and Eric Lindros. Quinn left the Flyers after the season as a free agent.

=== Pittsburgh Penguins, second stint ===
Quinn signed a one-year deal to return to the scene of his high scoring seasons in Pittsburgh but he was unable to replicate his success. After 16 games where Quinn posted no goals and just three assists, the Penguins released him and he announced his retirement from hockey in November of 1996.

== Golf career ==
Quinn embarked on a career in golf after his NHL career, and was one of the top players on the Celebrity Tour. In 2000, he caddied for John Daly at the U.S. Open. Quinn also caddies part-time for Ernie Els.

At the end of April 2014, Quinn became caddie for golfer Joost Luiten from the Netherlands, ranked number 43 at the Official World Golf Ranking.

Quinn has competed at the American Century Celebrity Golf Classic, an annual competition to determine the best golfers among American sports and entertainment celebrities. He won the tournament in 1992, 2001, 2002, 2004 and 2012, and has a total of eighteen top-10 finishes. The tournament, televised by NBC in July, is played at Edgewood Tahoe Golf Course in Lake Tahoe, Nevada.

Quinn has also played in four Web.com Tour events, but never made the 36-hole cut.

== Personal life ==
Quinn currently resides in Florida with his wife and their two daughters and son.

== Career statistics ==
=== Regular season and playoffs ===
			Regular season					Playoffs
Season	Team	League	GP	G	A	Pts	PIM	GP	G	A	Pts	PIM
1980–81	London Diamonds	WOHL	42	28	38	66	78	—	—	—	—	—
1980–81	Rockland Remparts	CJHL	2	0	0	0	0	—	—	—	—	—
1981–82	Belleville Bulls	OHL	67	19	32	51	41	—	—	—	—	—
1982–83	Belleville Bulls	OHL	70	59	88	147	27	4	2	6	8	2
1983–84	Belleville Bulls	OHL	24	23	36	59	12	—	—	—	—	—
1983–84	Calgary Flames	NHL	54	19	33	52	20	8	3	5	8	4
1984–85	Calgary Flames	NHL	74	20	38	58	22	3	0	0	0	0
1985–86	Calgary Flames	NHL	78	30	42	72	44	18	8	7	15	10
1986–87	Calgary Flames	NHL	16	3	6	9	14	—	—	—	—	—
1986–87	Pittsburgh Penguins	NHL	64	28	43	71	40	—	—	—	—	—
1987–88	Pittsburgh Penguins	NHL	70	40	39	79	50	—	—	—	—	—
1988–89	Pittsburgh Penguins	NHL	79	34	60	94	102	11	6	3	9	10
1989–90	Pittsburgh Penguins	NHL	41	9	20	29	22	—	—	—	—	—
1989–90	Vancouver Canucks	NHL	37	16	18	34	27	—	—	—	—	—
1990–91	Vancouver Canucks	NHL	64	18	31	49	46	—	—	—	—	—
1990–91	St. Louis Blues	NHL	14	4	7	11	20	13	4	7	11	32
1991–92	Philadelphia Flyers	NHL	67	11	26	37	26	—	—	—	—	—
1992–93	Minnesota North Stars	NHL	11	0	4	4	6	—	—	—	—	—
1993–94	SC Bern	NDA	25	13	18	31	56	—	—	—	—	—
1993–94	Ottawa Senators	NHL	13	7	0	7	6	—	—	—	—	—
1994–95	EV Zug	NDA	7	7	6	13	26	—	—	—	—	—
1994–95	Los Angeles Kings	NHL	44	14	17	31	32	—	—	—	—	—
1995–96	Ottawa Senators	NHL	28	6	18	24	24	—	—	—	—	—
1995–96	Detroit Vipers	IHL	4	0	5	5	2	—	—	—	—	—
1995–96	Philadelphia Flyers	NHL	35	7	14	21	22	12	1	4	5	6
1996–97	Pittsburgh Penguins	NHL	16	0	3	3	10	—	—	—	—	—
NHL totals			805	266	419	685	533	65	22	26	48	62

=== International ===
Year	Team	Event	Results	GP	G	A	Pts	PIM
1987	Canada	WC	4th	10	2	2	4	12

Preceded by None	Jack Ferguson Award; 1981	Succeeded by Kirk Muller
Preceded by Al MacInnis	Calgary Flames' first-round draft pick 1983	Succeeded by Gary Roberts
Preceded by Stan Smyl	Vancouver Canucks captain 1990–91, with Doug Lidster and Trevor Linden	Succeeded by Trevor Linden
