= List of Calgary Flames award winners =

Calgary Flames awards
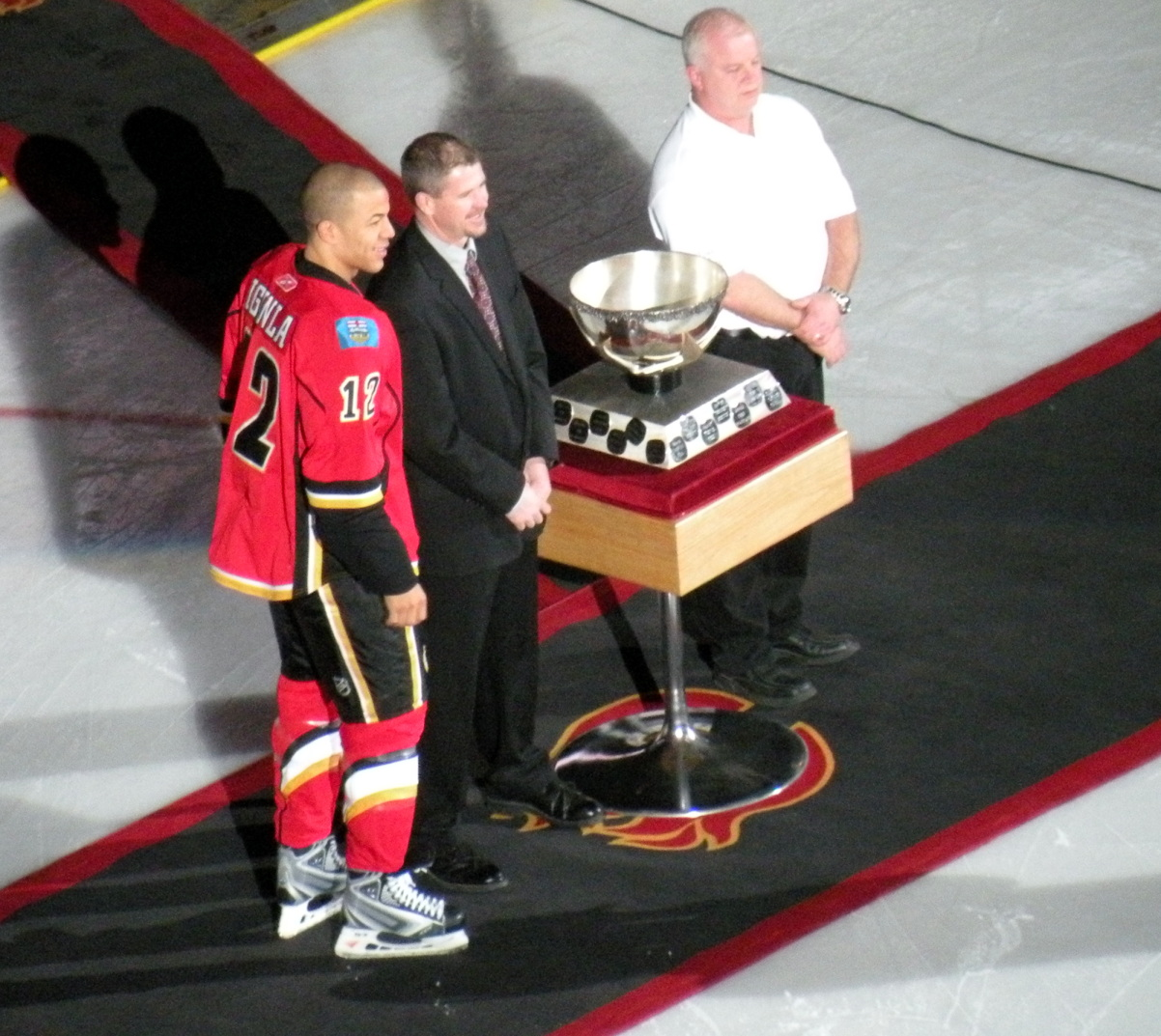
- Jarome Iginla is honoured during a Molson Cup ceremony.

Team trophies
- Award*: Wins
- Stanley Cup: 1
- Clarence S. Campbell Bowl: 3
- Presidents' Trophy: 2

Individual awards
- Award*: Wins
- Art Ross Trophy: 1
- Bill Masterton Memorial Trophy: 2
- Calder Memorial Trophy: 3
- Charlie Conacher Memorial Trophy: 1
- Conn Smythe Trophy: 1
- Jack Adams Award: 2
- James Norris Memorial Trophy: 1
- King Clancy Memorial Trophy: 4
- Lady Byng Memorial Trophy: 5
- Mark Messier Leadership Award: 2
- Maurice "Rocket" Richard Trophy: 2
- NHL Foundation Player Award: 2
- NHL Man of the Year Award: 1
- NHL Plus-Minus Award: 3
- Ted Lindsay Award: 1
- Vezina Trophy: 1
- William M. Jennings Trophy: 1

Total
- Awards won: 39

The Calgary Flames are a professional ice hockey team based in Calgary, Alberta, Canada. They are members of the Pacific Division of the Western Conference in the National Hockey League (NHL). The Flames arrived in Calgary in 1980 after transferring from the city of Atlanta, Georgia, where they were known as the Atlanta Flames from their founding in 1972 until relocation.

The Flames have won numerous team and individual awards and honours since moving to Calgary. The team has captured the Clarence S. Campbell Bowl as Western Conference champion in 1986, 1989 and 2004, winning the Stanley Cup in 1989. Jarome Iginla is the team's most decorated player, with two Rocket Richard Trophy wins, an Art Ross Trophy, and a Lester B. Pearson Award along with two selections to the NHL first All-Star team, one to the second All-Star team, and a selection to the All-Rookie Team in 1997. Theoren Fleury, Al MacInnis and Jarome Iginla each played in six National Hockey League All-Star Games, the most in Flames history.

Four players have had their numbers retired by the Flames. Lanny McDonald's number 9 was removed from circulation in 1989, while Mike Vernon's number 30 was retired in 2007. Jarome Iginla's number 12 was retired in 2019, and Miikka Kiprusoff's number 34 was retired in 2024. Additionally, Al MacInnis' number 2 was honoured in 2012 and Joe Nieuwendyk's number 25 in 2014. McDonald is also one of several Hockey Hall of Famers who were associated with the Flames. Joe Mullen and Al MacInnis played several seasons in Calgary as part of Hall of Fame careers, while general manager Cliff Fletcher, coach Bob Johnson and owner Harley Hotchkiss have each been inducted as builders.

The Flames have three internal team awards. The Molson Cup is awarded to the player who earns the most three-star selections throughout the season. The Ralph T. Scurfield Humanitarian Award, given for dedication and community service, and J. R. "Bud" McCaig Award, given for respect and courtesy, are presented towards the end of each season.

== League awards ==
=== Team trophies ===
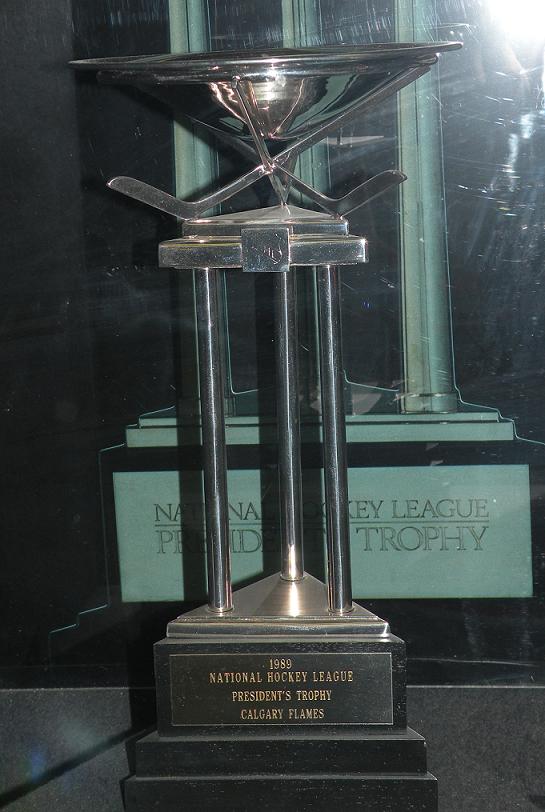
A replica of the Presidents' Trophy on display at the Pengrowth Saddledome.

The Calgary Flames have won the Western (previously the Campbell) Conference three times in franchise history, winning the Stanley Cup once, in 1989. They have twice won the Presidents' Trophy as the top team in the NHL during the regular season.

Team trophies awarded to the Calgary Flames
Award	Description	Times won	Seasons	References
Stanley Cup	NHL championship	1	1988–89	
Clarence S. Campbell Bowl	Western Conference playoff championship	3	1985–86, 1988–89, 2003–04	
Presidents' Trophy	Most regular season points	2	1987–88, 1988–89	

=== Individual awards ===
Jarome Iginla is one of the Flames' most decorated players. In 2001–02, Iginla led the NHL with 52-goals and 96-points, earning him the Rocket Richard and Art Ross Trophies. Iginla also was named the most valuable player as selected by his peers, and a first team all-star. Iginla won his second Richard Trophy when he tied for the league lead in goals with 41 in 2003–04.

Lanny McDonald was the first winner of the King Clancy Memorial Trophy in 1987–88, earning the award in recognition of his charity work in both Toronto and Calgary. Sergei Makarov was a controversial winner of the Calder Memorial Trophy in 1989–90. He won the rookie of the year award at the age of 31 after spending 13 seasons in the Soviet League. As a result, the NHL changed the rules for the award, restricting it to players aged 26 or younger.

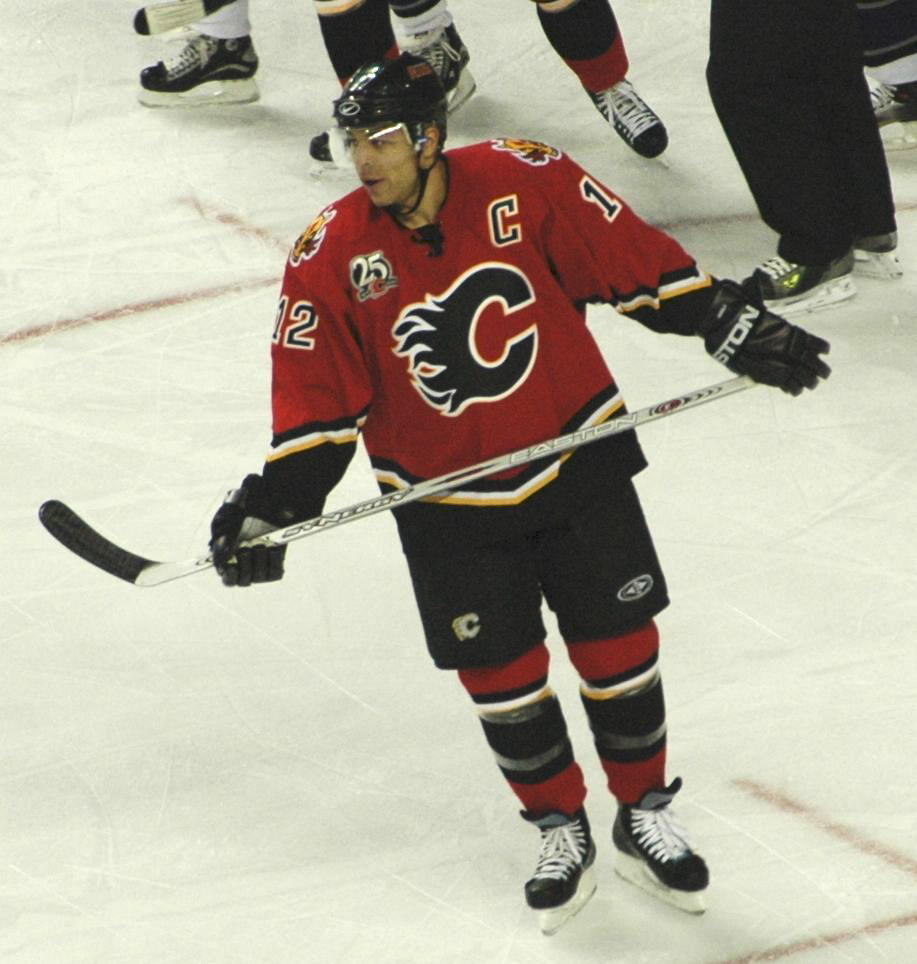
Jarome Iginla has won numerous league awards while a member of the Flames.

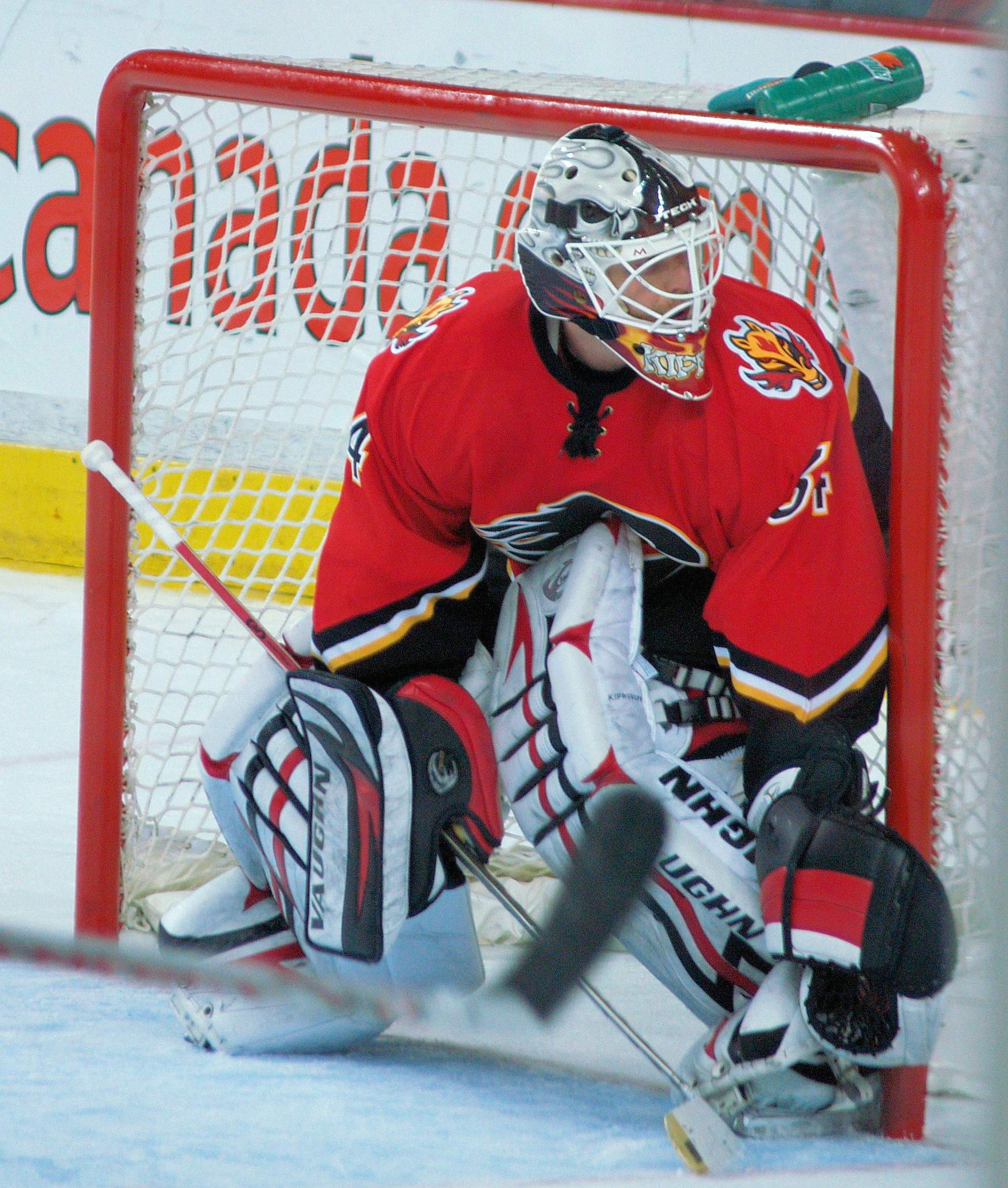
Miikka Kiprusoff won the Vezina Trophy as the NHL's top goaltender in 2005–06.

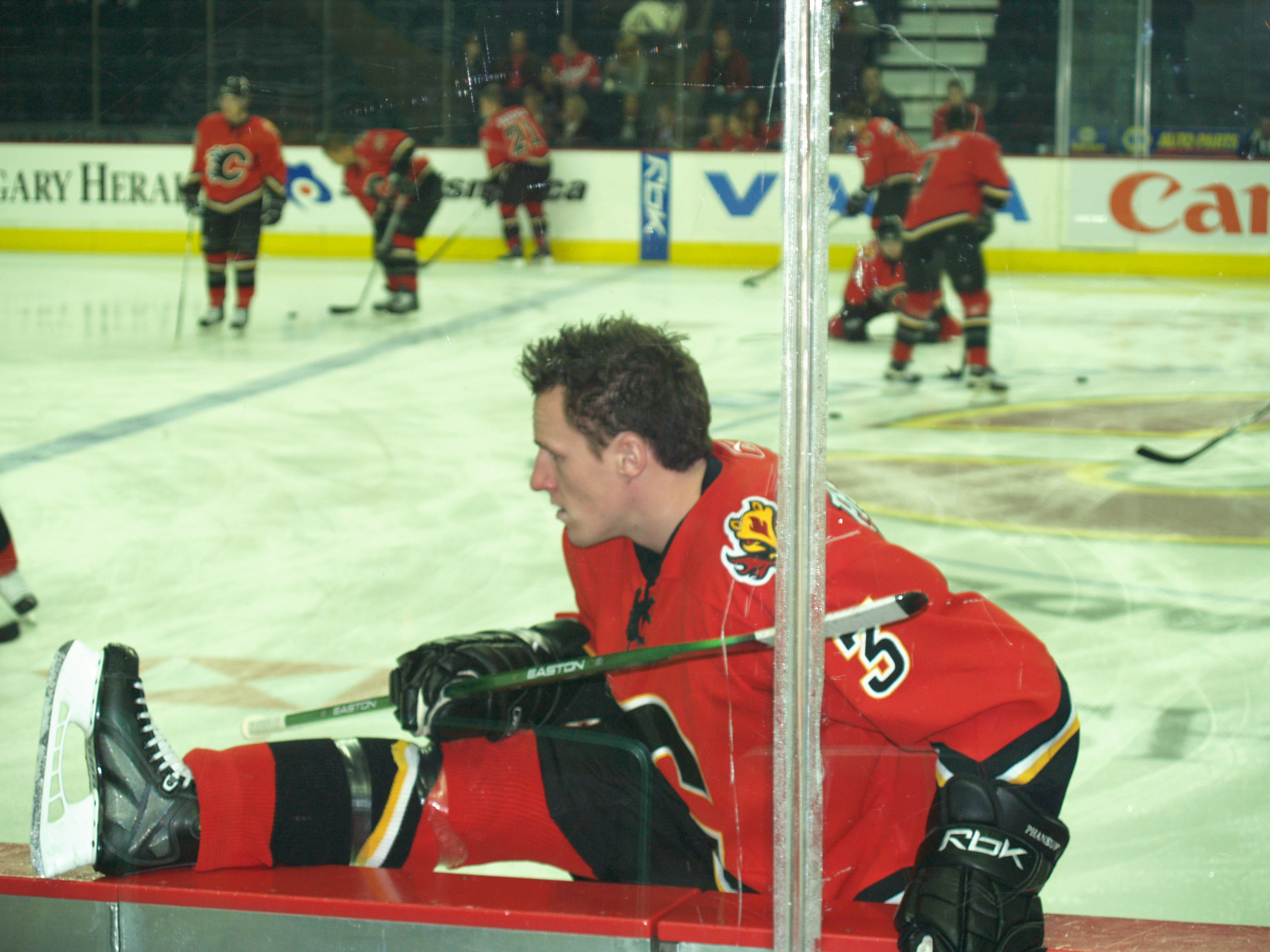
Dion Phaneuf was named a first-team All-Star in 2007–08.

Individual awards won by Calgary Flames players and staff
Award	Description	Winner	Season	References
Art Ross Trophy	Regular season scoring champion	Jarome Iginla	2001–02	
Bill Masterton Memorial Trophy	Perseverance, sportsmanship, and dedication to hockey	Lanny McDonald	1982–83	
Bill Masterton Memorial Trophy	Perseverance, sportsmanship, and dedication to hockey	Gary Roberts	1995–96	
Calder Memorial Trophy	Rookie of the year	Eric Vail†	1974–75	
Calder Memorial Trophy	Rookie of the year	Willi Plett†	1976–77	
Calder Memorial Trophy	Rookie of the year	Gary Suter	1985–86	
Calder Memorial Trophy	Rookie of the year	Joe Nieuwendyk	1987–88	
Calder Memorial Trophy	Rookie of the year	Sergei Makarov	1989–90	
Conn Smythe Trophy	Most valuable player of the playoffs	Al MacInnis	1988–89	
Jack Adams Award	Top coach during the regular season	Bob Hartley	2014–15	
Jack Adams Award	Top coach during the regular season	Darryl Sutter	2021–22	
James Norris Memorial Trophy	Top defenseman during the regular season	Mark Giordano	2018–19	
King Clancy Memorial Trophy	Leadership qualities on and off the ice and humanitarian contributions within their community	Lanny McDonald	1987–88	
King Clancy Memorial Trophy	Leadership qualities on and off the ice and humanitarian contributions within their community	Joe Nieuwendyk	1994–95	
King Clancy Memorial Trophy	Leadership qualities on and off the ice and humanitarian contributions within their community	Jarome Iginla	2003–04	
King Clancy Memorial Trophy	Leadership qualities on and off the ice and humanitarian contributions within their community	Mikael Backlund	2022–23	
Lady Byng Memorial Trophy	Gentlemanly conduct	Bob MacMillan†	1978–79	
Lady Byng Memorial Trophy	Gentlemanly conduct	Joe Mullen	1986–87	
Lady Byng Memorial Trophy	Gentlemanly conduct	Joe Mullen	1988–89	
Lady Byng Memorial Trophy	Gentlemanly conduct	Jiri Hudler	2014–15	
Lady Byng Memorial Trophy	Gentlemanly conduct	Johnny Gaudreau	2016–17	
Mark Messier Leadership Award	Leadership and contributions to society	Jarome Iginla	2008–09	
Mark Messier Leadership Award	Leadership and contributions to society	Mark Giordano	2019–20	
Maurice "Rocket" Richard Trophy	Most goals in the regular season	Jarome Iginla	2001–02	
Maurice "Rocket" Richard Trophy	Most goals in the regular season	Jarome Iginla	2003–04 (Note: Shared with Ilya Kovalchuk of the Atlanta Thrashers, and Rick Nash of the Columbus Blue Jackets.)	
NHL Foundation Player Award	Community service	Jarome Iginla	2003–04	
NHL Foundation Player Award	Community service	Mark Giordano	2015–16	
NHL Man of the Year Award	Sportsmanship and involvement with charitable groups	Lanny McDonald	1988–89	
NHL Plus-Minus Award	Highest plus/minus	Brad McCrimmon	1987–88	
NHL Plus-Minus Award	Highest plus/minus	Joe Mullen	1988–89	
NHL Plus-Minus Award	Highest plus/minus	Theoren Fleury	1990–91	
Ted Lindsay Award	Most outstanding player during the regular season	Jarome Iginla	2001–02	
Vezina Trophy	Top goaltender	Miikka Kiprusoff	2005–06	
William M. Jennings Trophy	Fewest goals given up in the regular season	Miikka Kiprusoff	2005–06	

† denotes player won the award as a member of the Atlanta Flames

== All-Stars ==
=== NHL first and second team All-Stars ===
The NHL first and second team All-Stars are the top players at each position as voted on by the Professional Hockey Writers' Association.

Calgary Flames selected to the NHL First and Second Team All-Stars
Player	Position	Selections	Season	Team
Theoren Fleury	Right wing	1	1994–95	2nd
Johnny Gaudreau	Left wing	1	2021–22	1st
Mark Giordano	Defence	1	2018–19	1st
Jarome Iginla	Right wing	4	2001–02	1st
Jarome Iginla	Right wing	4	2003–04	2nd
Jarome Iginla	Right wing	4	2007–08	1st
Jarome Iginla	Right wing	4	2008–09	1st
Miikka Kiprusoff	Goaltender	1	2005–06	1st
Hakan Loob	Right wing	1	1987–88	1st
Al MacInnis	Defence	5	1986–87	2nd
Al MacInnis	Defence	5	1988–89	2nd
Al MacInnis	Defence	5	1989–90	1st
Al MacInnis	Defence	5	1990–91	1st
Al MacInnis	Defence	5	1993–94	2nd
Jacob Markstrom	Goaltender	1	2021–22	2nd
Brad McCrimmon	Defence	1	1987–88	2nd
Lanny McDonald	Right wing	1	1982–83	2nd
Joe Mullen	Right wing	1	1988–89	1st
Dion Phaneuf	Defence	1	2007–08	1st
Gary Suter	Defence	1	1987–88	2nd
Matthew Tkachuk	Right wing	1	2021–22	2nd
Mike Vernon	Goaltender	1	1988–89	2nd

=== NHL All-Rookie Team ===
The NHL All-Rookie Team consists of the top rookies at each position as voted on by the Professional Hockey Writers' Association.

Calgary Flames selected to the NHL All-Rookie Team
Player	Position	Season
Johnny Gaudreau	Forward	2014–15
Jarome Iginla	Forward	1996–97
Hakan Loob	Forward	1983–84
Jamie Macoun	Defence	1983–84
Sergei Makarov	Forward	1989–90
Derek Morris	Defence	1998–99
Joe Nieuwendyk	Forward	1987–88
Dion Phaneuf	Defence	2005–06
Gary Suter	Defence	1985–86
Dustin Wolf	Goaltender	2024–25

=== All-Star Game selections ===
The National Hockey League All-Star Game is a mid-season exhibition game held annually between many of the top players of each season. Thirty-two All-Star Games have been held since the Flames arrived in Calgary, with at least one player representing the Flames in each year but 2001. The All-Star game has not been held in various years: 1979 and 1987 due to the 1979 Challenge Cup and Rendez-vous '87 series between the NHL and the Soviet national team, respectively, 1995, 2005 and 2013 as a result of labour stoppages, 2006, 2010, 2014 and 2026 because of the Winter Olympics, 2021 as a result of the COVID-19 pandemic, and 2025 when it was replaced by the 2025 4 Nations Face-Off. The NHL also holds a Young Stars Game for first- and second-year players.

The Flames hosted the 1985 All-Star Game at the Olympic Saddledome. A sell-out crowd saw the Wales Conference defeat the Campbell Conference 6–4, while Al MacInnis and Paul Reinhart represented the Flames at the game. Along with Theoren Fleury and Jarome Iginla, MacInnis played a franchise high six All-Star Games as a member of the Flames.

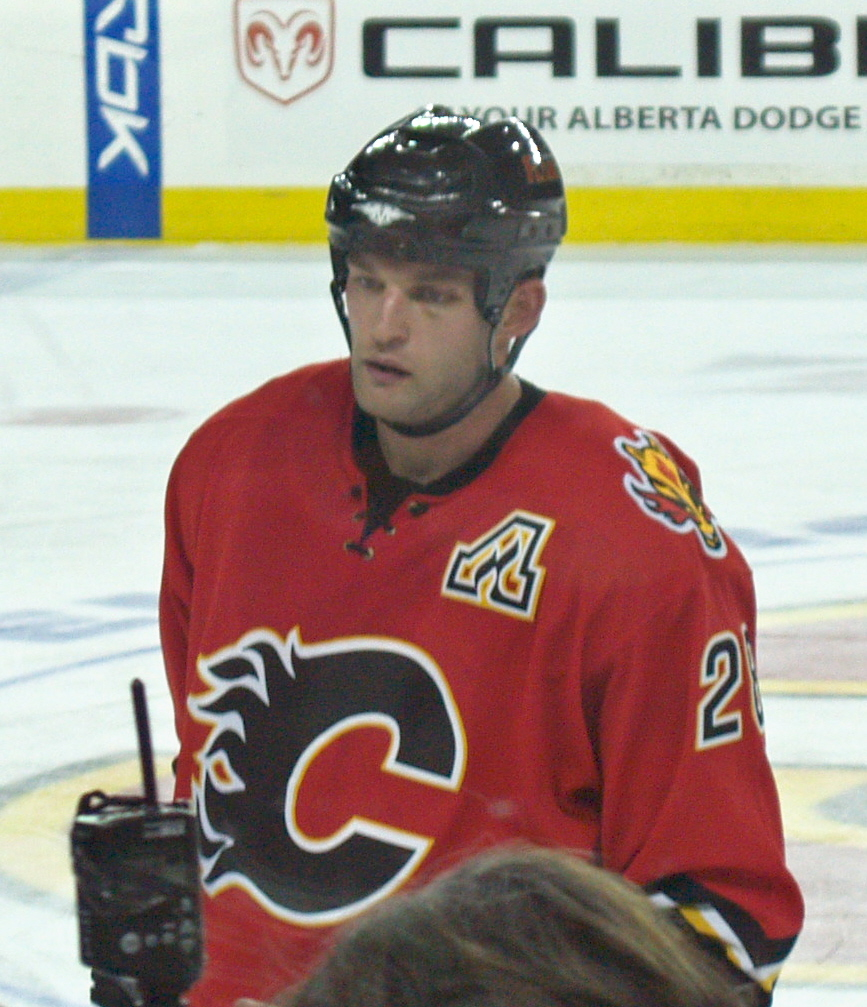
Robyn Regehr represented the Flames at the Young Stars game in 2002.

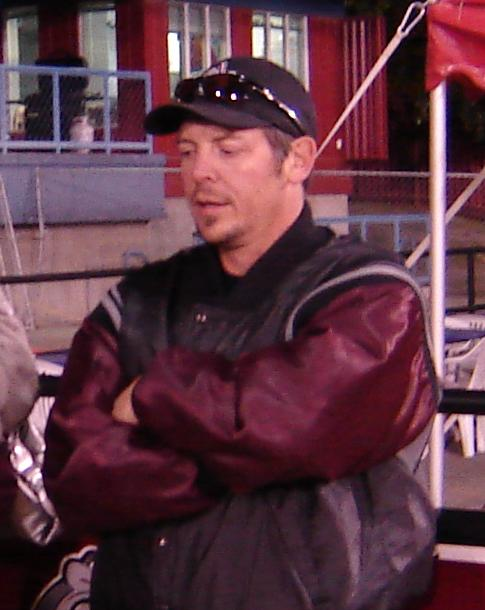
Theoren Fleury, pictured in 2008, represented the Flames in six All-Star Games.

- † Selected by fan vote

Calgary Flames players and coaches selected to the All-Star Game
Game	Year	Name	Position	References
26th	1973	Randy Manery	Defence	
27th	1974	Al McDonough	Right wing	
28th	1975	Curt Bennett	Centre	
28th	1975	Tom Lysiak	Centre	
29th	1976	Curt Bennett	Centre	
29th	1976	Tom Lysiak	Centre	
30th	1977	Tom Lysiak	Centre	
30th	1977	Eric Vail	Left wing	
31st	1978	Bill Clement	Centre	
32nd	1980	Kent Nilsson	Centre	
33rd	1981	Kent Nilsson	Centre	
34th	1982	Pekka Rautakallio	Defence	
35th	1983	Lanny McDonald	Right wing	
36th	1984	Lanny McDonald	Right wing	
37th	1985	Al MacInnis	Defence	
37th	1985	Paul Reinhart	Defence	
38th	1986	Gary Suter	Defence	
39th	1988	Al MacInnis	Defence	
39th	1988	Brad McCrimmon	Defence	
39th	1988	Joe Nieuwendyk	Centre	
39th	1988	Gary Suter	Defence	
39th	1988	Mike Vernon	Goaltender	
40th	1989	Joe Mullen	Right wing	
40th	1989	Joe Nieuwendyk	Centre	
40th	1989	Gary Suter	Defence	
40th	1989	Mike Vernon	Goaltender	
41st	1990	Terry Crisp	Coach	
41st	1990	Al MacInnis†	Defence	
41st	1990	Joe Mullen	Right wing	
41st	1990	Joe Nieuwendyk	Centre	
41st	1990	Mike Vernon†	Goaltender	
42nd	1991	Theoren Fleury	Right wing	
42nd	1991	Al MacInnis†	Defence	
42nd	1991	Gary Suter	Defence	
42nd	1991	Mike Vernon†	Goaltender	
43rd	1992	Theoren Fleury	Right wing	
43rd	1992	Al MacInnis†	Defence	
43rd	1992	Gary Roberts	Left wing	
44th	1993	Gary Roberts	Left wing	
44th	1993	Mike Vernon	Goaltender	
45th	1994	Al MacInnis	Defence	
45th	1994	Joe Nieuwendyk	Centre	
46th	1996	Theoren Fleury	Right wing	
47th	1997	Theoren Fleury	Right wing	
48th	1998	Theoren Fleury	Right wing	
49th	1999	Theoren Fleury	Right wing	
50th	2000	Valeri Bure	Right wing	
50th	2000	Phil Housley	Defence	
51st	2001	No Flames selected	—	
52nd	2002	Jarome Iginla	Right wing	
53rd	2003	Jarome Iginla	Right wing	
54th	2004	Jarome Iginla	Right wing	
55th	2007	Miikka Kiprusoff	Goaltender	
55th	2007	Dion Phaneuf	Defence	
56th	2008	Jarome Iginla†	Right wing	
56th	2008	Dion Phaneuf†	Defence	
57th	2009	Jarome Iginla	Right wing	
58th	2011	Jarome Iginla (Did not play)	Right wing	
59th	2012	Jarome Iginla	Right wing	
60th	2015	Johnny Gaudreau	Left wing	
60th	2015	Mark Giordano	Defence	
61st	2016	Johnny Gaudreau	Left wing	
61st	2016	Mark Giordano	Defence	
62nd	2017	Johnny Gaudreau	Left wing	
63rd	2018	Johnny Gaudreau	Left wing	
63rd	2018	Mike Smith (Subbed for Jonathan Quick)	Goaltender	
64th	2019	Johnny Gaudreau	Left wing	
64th	2019	Bill Peters	Coach	
65th	2020	Mark Giordano	Defence	
65th	2020	David Rittich (Subbed for Darcy Kuemper)	Goaltender	
65th	2020	Matthew Tkachuk	Left wing	
66th	2022	Johnny Gaudreau	Left wing	
67th	2023	Nazem Kadri	Centre	
68th	2024	Elias Lindholm	Centre	

=== All-Star Game replacement events ===
Calgary Flames players and coaches selected to All-Star Game replacement events
Event	Year	Name	Position	References
Rendez-vous '87	1987	Bob Johnson	Coach	
4 Nations Face-Off	2025	Rasmus Andersson (Sweden)	Defense	

== Career achievements ==
=== Hockey Hall of Fame ===
Several members of the Flames organization have been honoured by the Hockey Hall of Fame during the team's history in Calgary. Lanny McDonald was the first Flame player inducted, gaining election in 1992. McDonald recorded 215 goals in 492 games for the Flames, including a team record 66 goals in 1982–83. He was joined in 2000 by a fellow member of the 1989 Stanley Cup championship team, Joe Mullen. Mullen spent five seasons with the Flames, recording 388 points and capturing two Lady Byng Trophies. Grant Fuhr, elected in 2003, became the third former Flames player to enter the Hall. Fuhr played only one season in Calgary; however, he recorded his 400th career win in a Flames uniform, a victory over the Florida Panthers on October 22, 1999. In 2007, Al MacInnis became the fourth former Flame inducted into the Hall, and the third to earn his Hall of Fame credentials primarily as a Flame. MacInnis was a member of the Flames from 1981 until 1994. He is best remembered for his booming slapshot, as well as for winning the Conn Smythe Trophy in 1989 as the most valuable player of playoffs. On June 28, 2011, Joe Nieuwendyk was announced as an inductee to the Hockey Hall of Fame. Nieuwendyk played with the Flames from 1986-1987 until 1994–95. Joe was the team captain from 1991 until he left in '95.

Three members of team management have been inducted in the "Builders" category. Former head coach "Badger" Bob Johnson joined McDonald in the class of 1992, gaining election as a builder. Johnson coached five seasons with the Flames from 1982 to 1987, and his 193 wins remain a team record. Cliff Fletcher was the Flames general manager from the organization's inception in 1972 until 1991–a span of 19 years. During that time, the Flames qualified for the playoffs sixteen consecutive times between 1976 and 1991. Fletcher was inducted in 2004. In 2006, Harley Hotchkiss became the third Flames builder to gain election. Hotchkiss is the team's current governor, and is an original member of the ownership group that purchased and brought the Flames to Calgary in 1980. He has served many years as the chairman of the NHL Board of Directors, during which he played a significant role in the resolution of the 2004–05 lockout.

Two former Flames radio broadcasters have been recipients of the Foster Hewitt Memorial Award Former Atlanta Flames announcer from 1972 to 1980 Jiggs McDonald received it in 1990 for his time among the Flames and other teams and Peter Maher Calgary Flames announcer from 1980 to 2014 was named the recipient in 2006 for his years of service as the radio play-by-play announcer for the Calgary Flames. Maher had been the radio voice of the Flames since 1981, the team's second season in Calgary. He has called six All-Star Games and four Stanley Cup Finals. Former athletic trainer Bearcat Murray, who served with the Flames from 1980 until 1996 and remains with the organization as a community ambassador, will be inducted into the Hall of Fame by the Professional Hockey Athletic Trainers Society and the Society of Professional Hockey Equipment Managers.

Calgary Flames inducted into the Hockey Hall of Fame
Individual	Category	Year inducted	Years with Flames in category	References
Brian Burke	Builder	2026	2013-2018	
Cliff Fletcher	Builder	2004	1972–1991	
Grant Fuhr	Player	2003	1999–2000	
Doug Gilmour	Player	2011	1988–1992	
Harley Hotchkiss	Builder	2006	1980–2011	
Phil Housley	Player	2015	1994–1996, 1998–2001	
Brett Hull	Player	2009	1986–1988	
Jarome Iginla	Player	2020	1996–2013	
Bob Johnson	Builder	1992	1982–1987	
Al MacInnis	Player	2007	1981–1994	
Sergei Makarov	Player	2016	1989–1993	
Lanny McDonald	Player	1992	1981–1989	
Joe Mullen	Player	2000	1985–1990	
Joe Nieuwendyk	Player	2011	1986–1995	
David Poile	Builder	2024	1972–1982	
Pat Quinn	Builder	2016	1972–1977	
Daryl Seaman	Builder	2010	1980–2009	
Martin St. Louis	Player	2018	1998–2000	
Mike Vernon	Player	2023	1982, 1984, 1986–1994, 2000–2002	

=== Retired numbers ===
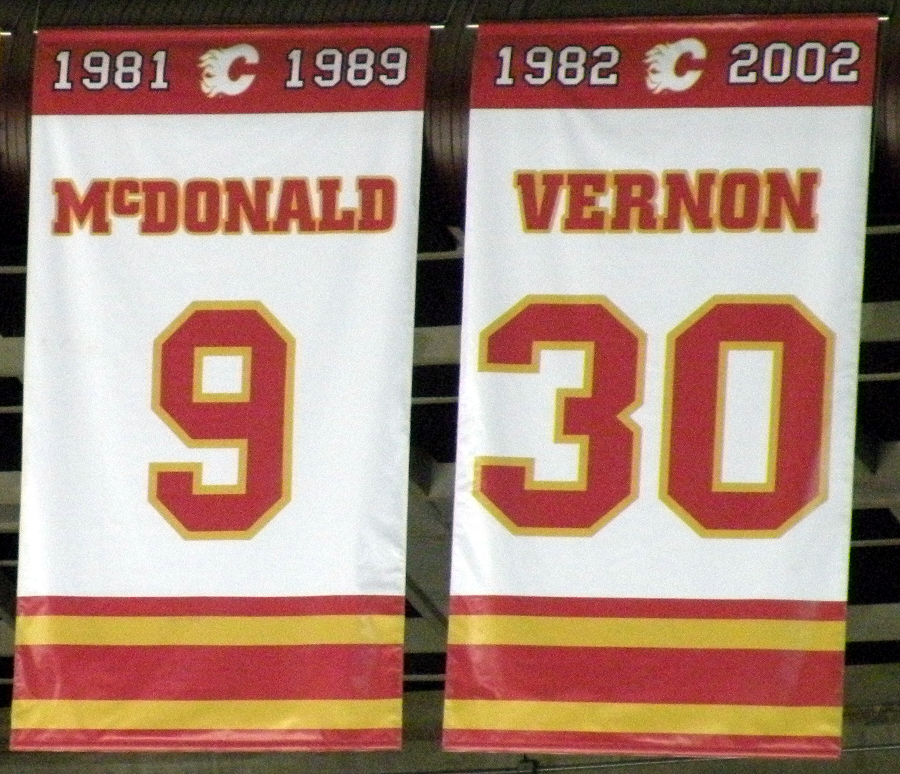
McDonald and Vernon's banners hang from the Saddledome rafters.

The Calgary Flames have retired four numbers, and a fifth was retired league-wide. The Flames retired #9 in honour of Lanny McDonald who played right wing for the Flames from 1981 to 1989, winning the Stanley Cup as the Flames captain in his final year. Mike Vernon's #30 is also retired; he was a goaltender with the Flames for fourteen years, from 1982 to 1994 and 2000 to 2002. #12 was retired in honor of Jarome Iginla, the Flames' right winger from 1996 to 2013. #34 was retired for goaltender Miikka Kiprusoff, who played for the Flames from 2003 to 2013. Also out of circulation is the number 99 which was retired league-wide for Wayne Gretzky on February 6, 2000. Gretzky did not play for the Flames during his 20-year NHL career and no Flames player had ever worn the number 99 prior to its retirement.

Calgary Flames retired numbers
Number	Player	Position	Years with Flames as a player	Date of retirement ceremony	References
9	Lanny McDonald	Right wing	1981–1989	March 17, 1990	
12	Jarome Iginla	Right wing	1996–2013	March 2, 2019	
30	Mike Vernon	Goaltender	1982–1994, 2000–2002	February 6, 2007	
34	Miikka Kiprusoff	Goaltender	2003–2013	March 2, 2024	

=== "Forever a Flame" ===
The organization introduced the "Forever a Flame" program in 2012 to replace the retiring of numbers as the highest honour the team can give a former player. The first player so honoured was Al MacInnis, who was a Flames draft pick in 1981, played 13 seasons in Calgary during which he was an eight-time all-star and winner of the Conn Smythe Trophy as the most valuable player of the 1989 playoffs. The second player so honoured was Joe Nieuwendyk, whose banner was raised March 7, 2014.

"Forever a Flame" honoured numbers
Number	Player	Position	Years with Flames as a player	Date of induction ceremony	References
2	Al MacInnis	Defence	1981–1994	February 27, 2012	
25	Joe Nieuwendyk	Centre	1987–1995	March 7, 2014	

== Team awards ==
=== J. R. "Bud" McCaig Award ===
The J. R. "Bud" McCaig Award is a team award given annually to two people, a player and a Flames' staff member, who "best exemplify Mr. McCaig’s enduring virtues of respect, courtesy and compassion for all individuals he encountered both in his professional and everyday life." The award is named in honour of Bud McCaig, a long time owner of the Flames who died in 2005. T. J. Brodie was the player's recipient in 2015–16.

Season	Winner
2005–06	Robyn Regehr
2006–07	Stephane Yelle
2007–08	Jarome Iginla
2008–09	Craig Conroy
2009–10	Daymond Langkow
2010–11	Tim Jackman

Season	Winner
2011–12	Mark Giordano
2012–13	Lee Stempniak
2013–14	Matt Stajan
2014–15	Kris Russell
2015–16	T. J. Brodie

Season	Winner
2016–17	Dougie Hamilton
2017–18	Mikael Backlund
2018–19	Matthew Tkachuk
2019–20	Milan Lucic
2020–21	Chris Tanev
2021–22	Trevor Lewis
2022–23	Blake Coleman
2023–24	Jonathan Huberdeau

=== Ralph T. Scurfield Humanitarian Award ===
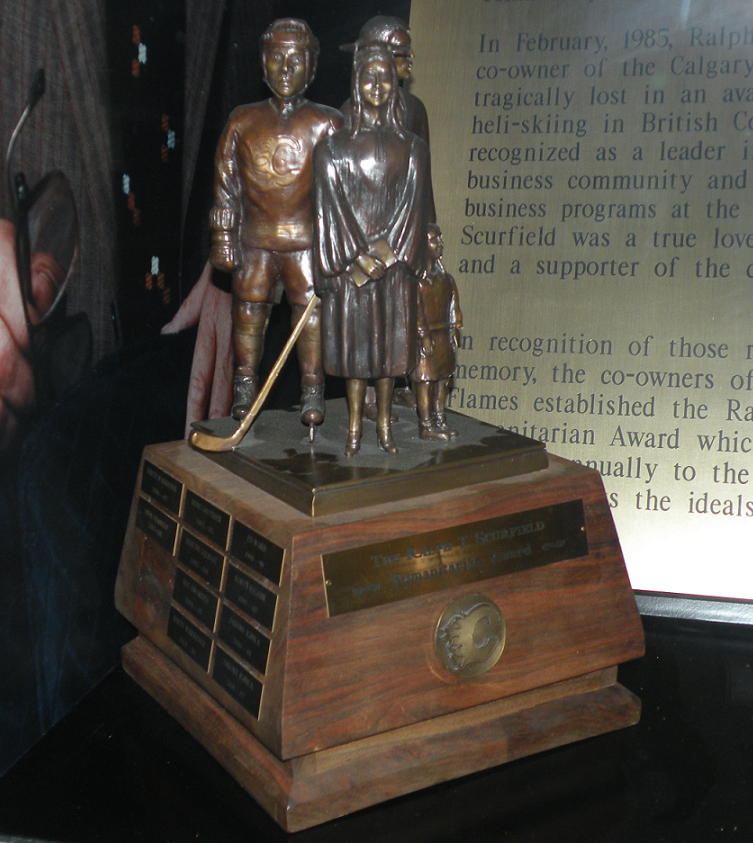
The Ralph T. Scurfield Humanitarian Award.

The Ralph T. Scurfield Humanitarian Award is a Flames team award given each year to the player who "best exemplifies the qualities of perseverance, determination and leadership on the ice, combined with dedication to community service." It was first awarded in 1987, and is named in honour of one of the Flames original owners, Ralph Thomas Scurfield. Mark Giordano was named the recipient for the 2015–16 season.

Season	Winner
1986–87	Lanny McDonald
1987–88	Jim Peplinski
1988–89	Lanny McDonald
1989–90	Tim Hunter
1990–91	Jamie Macoun
1991–92	Bob Johnson
1992–93	Joel Otto
1993–94	Al MacInnis
1994–95	Not awarded
1995–96	Gary Roberts
1996–97	Mike Sullivan

Season	Winner
1997–98	Ed Ward
1998–99	Ed Ward
1999–00	Robyn Regehr
2000–01	Jarome Iginla
2001–02	Jarome Iginla
2002–03	Denis Gauthier
2003–04	Martin Gelinas
2005–06	Rhett Warrener
2006–07	Rhett Warrener
2007–08	Dion Phaneuf
2008–09	David Moss

Season	Winner
2009–10	Craig Conroy
2010–11	Cory Sarich
2011–12	Curtis Glencross
2012–13	Matt Stajan
2013–14	Mikael Backlund
2014–15	Joe Colborne
2015–16	Mark Giordano
2016–17	Sean Monahan
2017–18	Travis Hamonic
2018–19	Travis Hamonic
2019–20	Sam Bennett
2020–21	
2021–22	Noah Hanifin
2022–23	Jonathan Huberdeau
2023–24	Rasmus Andersson

=== Sportsnet 3 Star Cup ===
The Flames were one of several teams in Canada that awarded the Molson Cup to the player who is named one of a game's top three players, or "three stars", most often over the course of the regular season. Jarome Iginla won the Molson Cup six times, the most in team history. After a six-year absence the award was brought back in 2017 as the Sportsnet 3 Star Cup.

Season	Winner
1980–81	Kent Nilsson
1981–82	Pat Riggin
1982–83	Lanny McDonald
1983–84	Rejean Lemelin
1984–85	Rejean Lemelin
1985–86	Hakan Loob
1986–87	Joe Mullen
1987–88	Hakan Loob
1988–89	Joe Mullen
1989–90	Joe Nieuwendyk
1990–91	Theoren Fleury

Season	Winner
1991–92	Mike Vernon
1992–93	Theoren Fleury
1993–94	Joe Nieuwendyk
1994–95	Trevor Kidd
1995–96	Theoren Fleury
1996–97	Trevor Kidd
1997–98	Theoren Fleury
1998–99	Fred Brathwaite
1999–00	Fred Brathwaite
2000–01	Jarome Iginla
2001–02	Jarome Iginla

Season	Winner
2002–03	Jarome Iginla
2003–04	Jarome Iginla
2005–06	Miikka Kiprusoff
2006–07	Miikka Kiprusoff
2007–08	Jarome Iginla
2008–09	Miikka Kiprusoff
2009–10	Miikka Kiprusoff
2010–11	Jarome Iginla
2012 to 2016	award did not exist
2016–17	Mikael Backlund
2017–18	Mike Smith

== Other awards ==
Calgary Flames who have received non-NHL awards
Award	Description	Winner	Season	References
Best NHL Player ESPY Award	Best NHL player of the last calendar year	Jarome Iginla	2002	
Best NHL Player ESPY Award	Best NHL player of the last calendar year	Jarome Iginla	2004	
Charlie Conacher Humanitarian Award	For humanitarian or community service projects	Jim Peplinski	1983–84	
Viking Award	Most valuable Swedish player in NHL	Kent Nilsson	1980–81	
Viking Award	Most valuable Swedish player in NHL	Hakan Loob	1987–88	
