= Budweiser NHL Man of the Year Award =

Defunct National Hockey League award

The Budweiser NHL Man of the Year Award was sponsored by Anheuser-Busch to award a National Hockey League player based on his sportsmanship and involvement with charitable groups. Every NHL team nominates a player and the winner would be chosen by a panel of judges at the start of the Stanley Cup playoffs and receive $21,000 to donate to their charities. The award lasted from the 1987–88 season until the 1991–92 season. Six years later, the NHL established the NHL Foundation Player Award, which served a similar function until it was merged into the King Clancy Memorial Trophy in 2017–18.

== Winners ==
| Season | Winner | Nationality | Position | Team | Note |
|---|---|---|---|---|---|
| 1987–88 | Bryan Trottier | Canada; United States | Centre | New York Islanders | |
| 1988–89 | Lanny McDonald | Canada | Right wing | Calgary Flames | |
| 1989–90 | Kevin Lowe | Canada | Defenceman | Edmonton Oilers | |
| 1990–91 | Kevin Dineen | Canada | Right wing | Hartford Whalers | |
| 1991–92 | Ryan Walter | Canada | Centre | Vancouver Canucks | |
