= Mikael Backlund =

Swedish ice hockey player (born 1989)

- Backlund with the Calgary Flames in 2026
- Born: 17 March 1989 (age 37) Västerås, Sweden
- Height: 6 ft 0 in (183 cm)
- Weight: 201 lb (91 kg; 14 st 5 lb)
- Position: Centre
- Shoots: Left
- NHL team: Calgary Flames
- National team: Sweden
- NHL draft: 24th overall, 2007; Calgary Flames
- Playing career: 2008–present

Mikael Backlund (born 17 March 1989) is a Swedish professional ice hockey player who is a centre and captain of the Calgary Flames of the National Hockey League (NHL).

Backlund was a first round selection, 24th overall, of the Flames in the 2007 NHL entry draft, and made his NHL debut in 2008–09. He played junior hockey for VIK Västerås HK in the J20 SuperElit and the Kelowna Rockets of the Western Hockey League (WHL). He was a member of Kelowna's WHL championship team in 2009.

Internationally, Backlund has represented Sweden on several occasions—he was a member of two silver medal-winning teams at the World Junior Championship, and has won a bronze, silver and gold medals with the Swedes at the World Championship.

== Playing career ==
=== Västerås HK ===
Backlund began his junior hockey career with the VIK Västerås HK organization in the J20 SuperElit, Sweden's premier junior league. His impressive two-way play earned him the opportunity to play for Västerås' senior team in the second-tier HockeyAllsvenskan as a 16-year-old. In his debut on 2 November 2005, during an away game against Växjö Lakers, Backlund scored a goal in the first period of a 4–0 win and was selected as the player of the game for his team. He tallied four points in his 12 games in HockeyAllsvenskan during the 2005–06 season. That same season, Backlund was dominant in the 2006 TV-pucken, a national under-17 tournament in Sweden played among districts. Leading the tournament in goal- and point-scoring, he was selected as the most valuable player and given the Sven Tumba Award as best forward in the tournament.

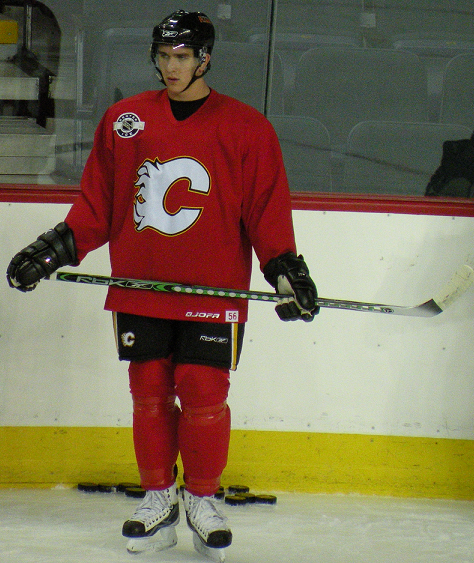
Backlund during the Calgary Flames training camp, September 2008. Although he attended the Flames training camp, he returned to Västerås to play another season there.

Backlund played another two seasons for Västerås HK, splitting time in the J20 SuperElit and HockeyAllsvenskan. During this time, he was selected in the first round, 24th overall, by the Calgary Flames in the 2007 NHL entry draft. Scouts had ranked him second amongst European skaters. Following the 2007–08 season, Backlund signed an entry-level contract with the Flames. He impressed during the rookie camp but was not as successful during the main training camp, and started the 2008–09 season playing on loan for Västerås back in HockeyAllsvenskan. After his success in the 2009 World Junior Championships, he returned to Calgary and made his NHL debut on 8 January 2009, in a 5–2 win against the New York Islanders. Soon thereafter, the Flames assigned him to the Kelowna Rockets of the Western Hockey League (WHL) for the remainder of the 2008–09 season. Competing for the Rockets in the 2009 WHL playoffs, Backlund tied teammate Jamie Benn for the League lead with 13 goals in 19 games as Kelowna defeated the Calgary Hitmen in the final to win the Ed Chynoweth Cup.

=== Calgary Flames ===
Backlund began the 2009–10 season with the Flames' American Hockey League (AHL) affiliate, the Abbotsford Heat. On 26 January 2010, he was called up to play on the NHL squad, and scored his first NHL goal on 28 January against the Phoenix Coyotes. He split the season between the AHL and NHL, scoring 32 points in 54 games in Abbotsford, and ten points in 23 games with Calgary. Though he spent most of the 2010–11 season in Calgary, Backlund struggled offensively early, and after scoring just eight points in his first 32 games, was sat out of six consecutive games as a healthy scratch before being sent to Abbotsford on a brief conditioning stint. He appeared in 73 games for the Flames, scoring ten goals and 25 points.

Injuries plagued Backlund throughout 2011–12. He was expected to centre the Flames' top line between Jarome Iginla and Alex Tanguay, but suffered a broken finger in training camp that twice required surgery to repair and caused him to miss the first six weeks of the season. He then suffered a shoulder injury in a mid-February game while attempting to confront a Vancouver Canucks player he felt had injured a teammate. The injury ended his season, and in 41 games, he scored only 11 points.

Following the season, the Flames re-signed Backlund to a new contract for the 2012–13 season, a one-year deal worth US$725,000. However, with the season's start delayed by a labour dispute, Backlund returned to Sweden for the balance of the lockout. He re-joined Västerås and appeared in 23 games for the team, scoring 12 goals and 30 points before returning to North America after a new deal between the NHL and its players was reached. His performance with Västerås provided a confidence boost for Backlund, who said that he wanted to return to Calgary and "show everybody I can play way better." Backlund enjoyed a solid NHL season upon coming back to Calgary, missing 16 games but still managing to post one point every two games on average for the first time in his career. His eight goals and sixteen points were eighth and tenth on a rebuilding Flames team which badly missed the playoffs.

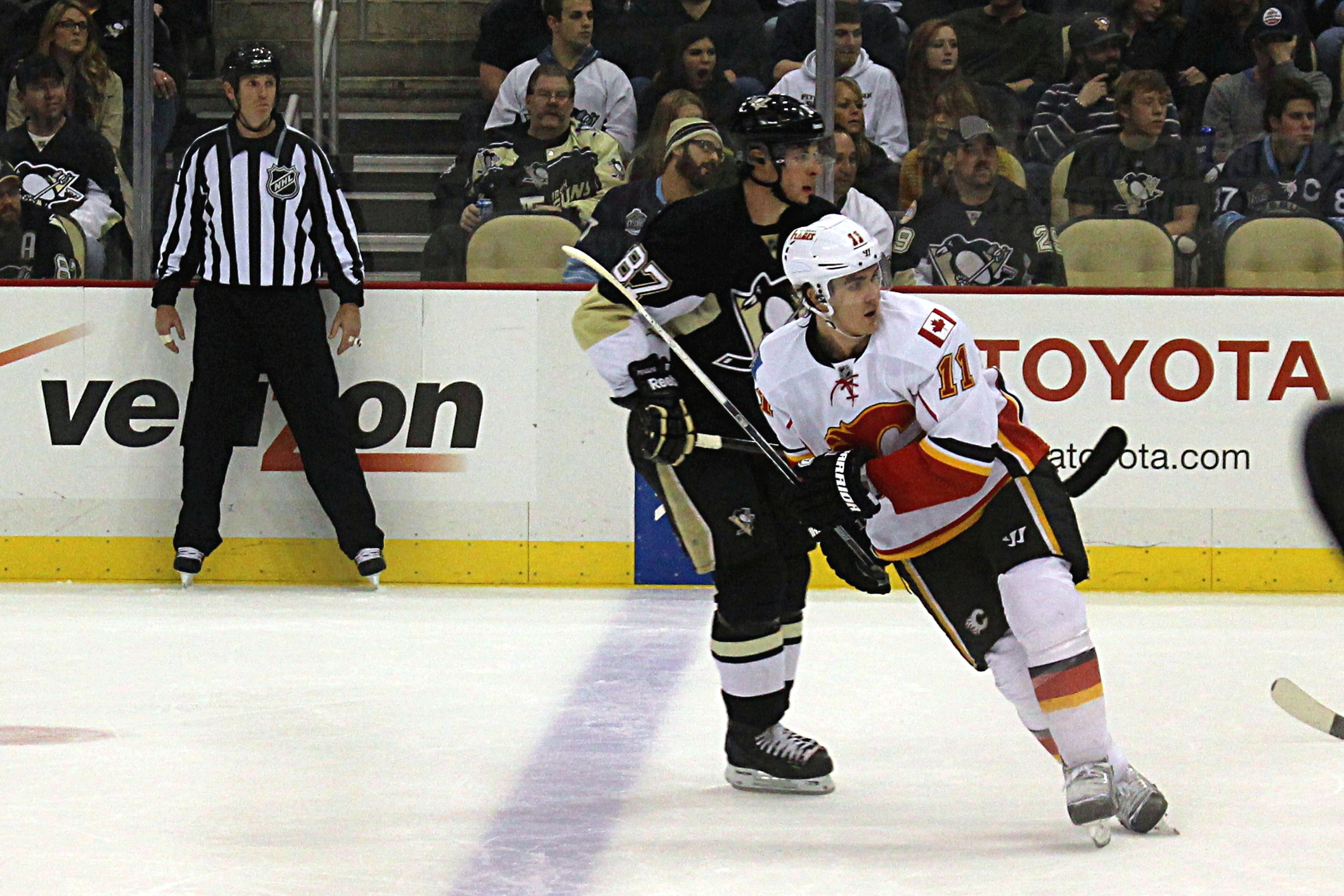
Backlund skating against the Penguins, December 2013

In July 2013, the Flames signed Backlund to a two-year, $3 million contract extension. That season, he recorded the best totals of his career in every offensive category, finishing third on the Flames in goals (18) and fourth in points (39). While the team around him regressed to the worst finish in team history, Backlund asserted himself as one of its top offensive threats.

In 2014–15, Backlund faltered slightly, suffering through injuries and trade rumours; however, the Flames surprisingly skyrocketed up the standings en route to their first playoff berth in six years. Backlund's 10 goals and 27 points were just 11th and 12th on the Flames, but he only played 52 games in the regular season. He continued struggling into the playoffs, only recording 1 goal and 1 assist in 11 games played. However, the one goal Backlund scored was an important one, as it came in overtime of Game 3 of the Flames' second-round series against the Anaheim Ducks to give Calgary their first win past the first round in 13 years.

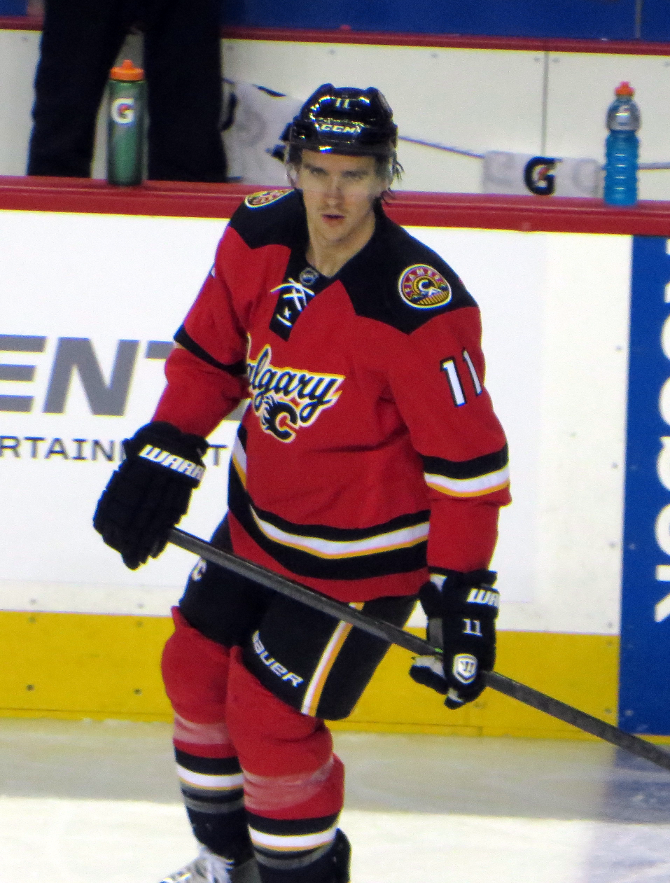
Backlund in 2014

On 20 June 2015, Backlund signed a three-year, $10.725 million contract extension with Calgary. Put on a line with free-agent acquisition Michael Frolík, Backlund enjoyed his most productive year yet in 2015–16, passing the 20-goal and 40-point plateaus for the first time in his career. His final totals were 21 goals and 26 assists for 47 points. While contributing significantly in the offensive zone, Backlund also established himself as a defensive catalyst, forming a tag-team on the penalty kill with Frolík; together, the two of them combined for five short-handed goals in the season. Backlund finished first on the team in the plus/minus column, sporting a +10.

Backlund kept improving in 2016–17, turning into one of the NHL's premier two-way players. At the discretion of new head coach Glen Gulutzan, rookie Matthew Tkachuk was slotted in on the left side of Backlund and Frolík, forming a line dubbed by fans and media as the "3M Line". Matthew, Mikael and Michael formed one of the most potent lines in the NHL in 2016–17, combining for 145 points, the most of any Flames line. Contributing the most offense to that line was Backlund, who once again eclipsed his career-highs by posting 22 goals and 53 points, good for second and third on the Flames. He also played well past the regular season, posting a goal and two assists in four playoff games. However, it was Backlund's defensive work that began to receive recognition around the NHL in 2016–17, as he finished fourth in voting for the Frank J. Selke Trophy, awarded each year to the NHL's best defensive forward.

On 16 February 2018, Backlund signed a six-year, $32.1 million contract extension with the Flames.

On 27 September 2023, Backlund signed a two-year contract extension with the Flames, and was named the 21st captain in franchise history.

== International play ==
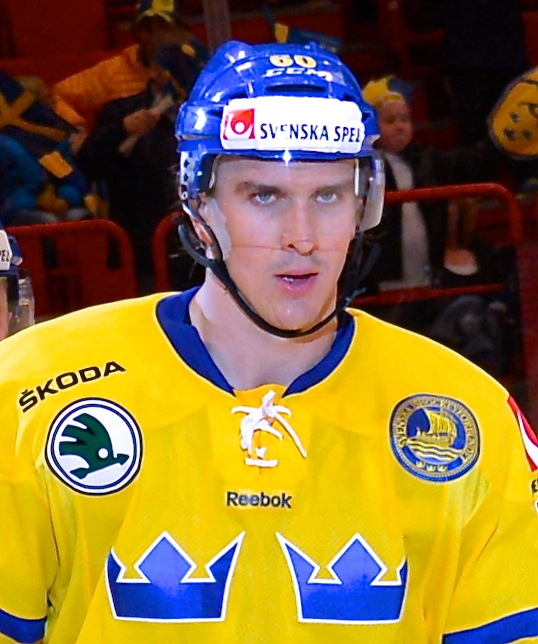
- Backlund with the Swedish men's national hockey team, May 2014

Medal record

Representing Sweden

Ice hockey

World Championships
Gold medal – first place	2018 Denmark	
Bronze medal – third place	2010 Germany	
Silver medal – second place	2011 Slovakia	
Bronze medal – third place	2014 Belarus	
Bronze medal – third place	2025 Sweden/Denmark	

World Junior Championships
Silver medal – second place	2008 Czech Republic	
Silver medal – second place	2009 Canada	

World U18 Junior Championships
Bronze medal – third place	2007 Finland	

Backlund played for Sweden at the 2006 World U18 Championships, scoring one goal in three games. In 2007, he led Sweden to a U18 bronze medal when he scored a natural hat-trick in an 8–3 win over Canada in the bronze medal game. He led the tournament in goal-scoring with six goals in six games.

Backlund was a member of the Swedish junior team that won back-to-back silver medals in the 2008 and 2009 World Junior Championships, losing to Canada in both instances. He scored the game-winning goal in overtime in the 2008 semi-final against Russia. The next year, he recorded a two-goal game in the semi-final against Slovakia.

After being eliminated in the second round of the AHL playoffs in 2010, Backlund was invited to play for Sweden's men's team at the World Championships, accepting the offer.

Despite being left off the initial roster, Backlund was invited to the 2016 World Cup of Hockey as a replacement for injured Henrik Zetterberg on 1 September. Backlund is the captain of the Swedish team, and helped to win the gold at the World Championships in 2018.

== Personal life ==
Backlund is charitably active in both Calgary and Sweden. In Calgary, he is a spokesman for both the Special Olympics and the Kid's Cancer Care Foundation. Since 2013, he has donated $150 to the latter charity for each NHL point he records. He has also listed the ALS Society of Alberta has his charity of choice, and in partnership with KPMG, donates $200 for every point he earns. In Sweden, Backlund participated in the Ride for Hope bicycle race and raised $27,000 for charity. The Flames recognized his charitable efforts by naming him the 2014 recipient of the Ralph T. Scurfield Humanitarian Award.

Backlund married his fiancée Frida Engström in Sweden on 11 August 2018. Together, the couple have a daughter and a son. He is the nephew of former professional footballer Gary Sundgren and the cousin of professional footballer Daniel Sundgren.

== Career statistics ==
=== Regular season and playoffs ===
			Regular season					Playoffs
Season	Team	League	GP	G	A	Pts	PIM	GP	G	A	Pts	PIM
2004–05	Västerås HK	J18 Allsv	14	5	6	11	14	4	2	1	3	2
2005–06	Västerås HK	J20	25	15	16	31	30	—	—	—	—	—
2005–06	Västerås HK	Allsv	12	2	2	4	14	—	—	—	—	—
2006–07	Västerås HK	J18 Allsv	2	2	1	3	2	1	0	0	0	10
2006–07	Västerås HK	J20	7	5	4	9	8	5	1	0	1	4
2006–07	Västerås HK	Allsv	18	1	2	3	14	—	—	—	—	—
2007–08	Västerås HK	J20	9	7	6	13	20	—	—	—	—	—
2007–08	Västerås HK	Allsv	37	9	4	13	24	14	6	3	9	4
2008–09	Västerås HK	J20	2	3	2	5	0	—	—	—	—	—
2008–09	Västerås HK	Allsv	17	4	4	8	39	—	—	—	—	—
2008–09	Calgary Flames	NHL	1	0	0	0	0	—	—	—	—	—
2008–09	Kelowna Rockets	WHL	28	12	18	30	26	19	13	10	23	26
2009–10	Abbotsford Heat	AHL	54	15	17	32	26	13	1	8	9	14
2009–10	Calgary Flames	NHL	23	1	9	10	6	—	—	—	—	—
2010–11	Calgary Flames	NHL	73	10	15	25	18	—	—	—	—	—
2010–11	Abbotsford Heat	AHL	1	0	0	0	0	—	—	—	—	—
2011–12	Calgary Flames	NHL	41	4	7	11	16	—	—	—	—	—
2012–13	Västerås HK	Allsv	23	12	18	30	22	—	—	—	—	—
2012–13	Calgary Flames	NHL	32	8	8	16	29	—	—	—	—	—
2013–14	Calgary Flames	NHL	76	18	21	39	32	—	—	—	—	—
2014–15	Calgary Flames	NHL	52	10	17	27	14	11	1	1	2	8
2015–16	Calgary Flames	NHL	82	21	26	47	28	—	—	—	—	—
2016–17	Calgary Flames	NHL	81	22	31	53	36	4	1	2	3	0
2017–18	Calgary Flames	NHL	82	14	31	45	78	—	—	—	—	—
2018–19	Calgary Flames	NHL	77	21	26	47	52	5	1	2	3	8
2019–20	Calgary Flames	NHL	70	16	29	45	26	10	4	2	6	8
2020–21	Calgary Flames	NHL	54	9	23	32	30	—	—	—	—	—
2021–22	Calgary Flames	NHL	82	12	27	39	30	12	5	3	8	8
2022–23	Calgary Flames	NHL	82	19	37	56	36	—	—	—	—	—
2023–24	Calgary Flames	NHL	82	15	24	39	24	—	—	—	—	—
2024–25	Calgary Flames	NHL	76	15	17	32	32	—	—	—	—	—
2025–26	Calgary Flames	NHL	82	17	26	43	16	—	—	—	—	—
NHL totals			1,148	232	374	606	503	42	12	10	22	32

=== International ===
Year	Team	Event	Result	GP	G	A	Pts	PIM
2006	Sweden	U18	6th	3	1	0	1	0
2007	Sweden	U18	3rd place, bronze medalist(s)	6	6	1	7	6
2008	Sweden	WJC	2nd place, silver medalist(s)	6	3	4	7	10
2009	Sweden	WJC	2nd place, silver medalist(s)	6	5	2	7	6
2010	Sweden	WC	3rd place, bronze medalist(s)	6	0	1	1	2
2011	Sweden	WC	2nd place, silver medalist(s)	9	3	2	5	2
2014	Sweden	WC	3rd place, bronze medalist(s)	10	5	3	8	29
2016	Sweden	WC	6th	8	3	1	4	4
2016	Sweden	WCH	3rd	2	0	0	0	0
2018	Sweden	WC	1st place, gold medalist(s)	10	2	7	9	6
2025	Sweden	WC	3rd place, bronze medalist(s)	9	3	6	9	4
Junior totals				21	15	7	22	22
Senior totals				54	16	20	36	47

== Awards and honours ==
Award	Year
TV-pucken
Most Valuable Player Award	2006
Sven Tumba Award	2006
NHL
King Clancy Memorial Trophy	2023
Calgary Flames
Ralph T. Scurfield Humanitarian Award	2013–14

Awards and achievements
Preceded by Leland Irving	Calgary Flames first-round draft pick 2007	Succeeded by Greg Nemisz
Preceded by P. K. Subban	King Clancy Memorial Trophy winner 2023	Succeeded by Anders Lee
Sporting positions
Preceded by Mark Giordano	Calgary Flames captain 2023–present	Incumbent
