= Mark Giordano =

Canadian ice hockey player (born 1983)

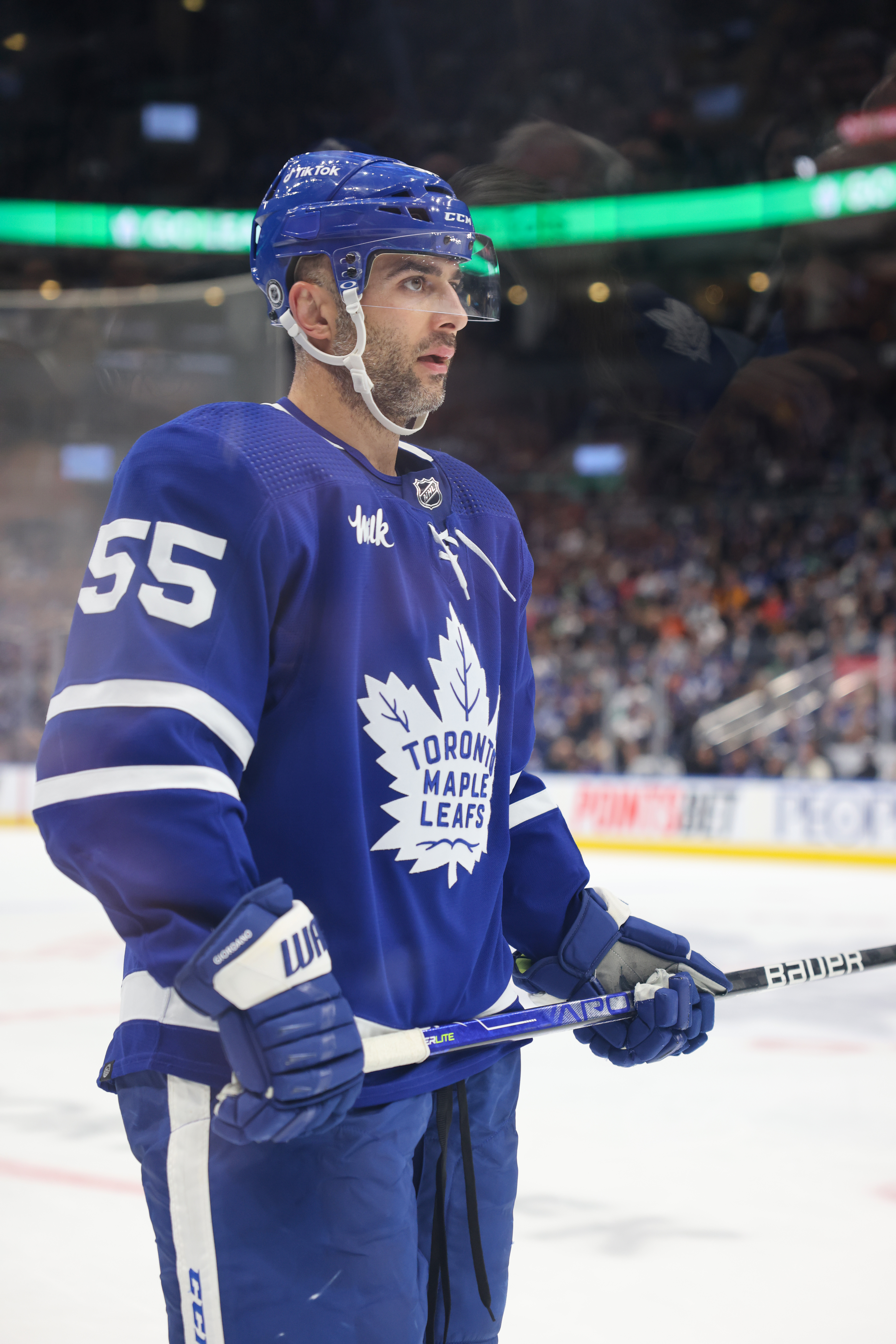
- Giordano with the Toronto Maple Leafs in 2022
- Born: October 3, 1983 (age 42) Toronto, Ontario, Canada
- Height: 6 ft 0 in (183 cm)
- Weight: 205 lb (93 kg; 14 st 9 lb)
- Position: Defence
- Shot: Left
- Played for: Calgary Flames; Dynamo Moscow; Seattle Kraken; Toronto Maple Leafs
- National team: Canada
- NHL draft: Undrafted
- Playing career: 2004–2024

Mark Giordano (/dʒoʊrˈdænoʊ/; born October 3, 1983) is a Canadian professional ice hockey coach and former player who is an advisor for the Toronto Maple Leafs of the National Hockey League (NHL). In the NHL, he played as a defenceman for the Calgary Flames for 15 seasons, where he was the team captain for his final eight seasons, and the Seattle Kraken, where he served as captain during the first six months of their inaugural season. An undrafted player, Giordano signed with the Flames as a free agent in 2004 after playing two seasons of major junior ice hockey with Owen Sound Attack of the Ontario Hockey League (OHL).

Giordano was named to play his first NHL All-Star Game in 2015, and he was named the recipient of the J. R. "Bud" McCaig Award by the Flames for his charitable work in 2012. Internationally, Giordano played with Team Canada at the 2010 IIHF World Championship and was a member of the 2007 Spengler Cup winning team. In 2019, he was awarded the James Norris Memorial Trophy as the NHL's best defenceman, while having a career-best performance at the age of 35.

== Early life ==
Mark Giordano was born in Toronto, Ontario, on October 3, 1983. His father, Paul, was a real estate agent and his mother, Anna, a hairdresser. He is of Italian descent. Giordano has an older sister, Michelle, and had another older sister, Mia, who was killed in a car accident when he was 14. He taps his helmet twice with his stick at the end of the national anthems before each game as a quiet tribute to his sister, whose death had a lasting impact on Giordano and his family and brought them closer together.

As a youth, Giordano played both hockey and baseball, but focused on hockey as the demands of both sports on his time increased. Giordano played minor ice hockey in North York and attended Chaminade College School. He played in the 1997 Quebec International Pee-Wee Hockey Tournament with a team from Richmond Hill.

== Playing career ==
=== Junior ===
Giordano played one season of Junior A hockey with the Brampton Capitals of the Ontario Junior Hockey League in 2001–02 where he scored 24 goals in the playoffs to help lead the Capitals to the Ontario provincial championship. He then moved up to major junior, playing two seasons with the Owen Sound Attack of the Ontario Hockey League (OHL). He was the top scoring defenceman on the team for both years. As a 19-year-old rookie, Giordano recorded 48 points for Owen Sound in 2002–03 and, as one of the top first-year players in the league, was named to the OHL First All-Rookie Team.

Despite his offensive success in junior, Giordano went unselected at the NHL entry draft. He accepted an invitation to attend the Phoenix Coyotes' training camp where, according to then-Owen Sound General Manager Mike Futa, Giordano impressed team officials but believed that he would be best served by playing a second season in the OHL. Giordano finished the 2003–04 season with 49 points.

After graduating from junior hockey, Giordano enrolled at York University and planned to study at its school of business when he received a late invitation from the Calgary Flames to attend their summer camp. Former Flames coach Jim Playfair recalled that Giordano stood out among the group of invitees and said that his skill and skating ability set him apart: "Darryl (Sutter) met with three or four of those kids and gave them all the same contracts: Three years in the American League, and if it works out for you, you've got a career. Gio took it and ran with it." The Flames signed him to a contract following the camp.

=== Professional ===
==== Calgary Flames ====
The Flames assigned Giordano to their American Hockey League (AHL) affiliate, the Lowell Lock Monsters, for the 2004–05 season where he scored 6 goals and added 10 assists in 66 games. He remained in the AHL for much of the 2005–06 season, transferring to Calgary's new affiliate, the Omaha Ak-Sar-Ben Knights. Giordano led the Knights in scoring, recording 16 goals and 58 points in 73 games. Additionally, he was second among defencemen in the AHL in goal scoring and fourth in points. The Flames recalled him to Calgary at mid-season, and he made his NHL debut on January 30, 2006, against the St. Louis Blues. Giordano appeared in seven games with the Flames, and recorded his first NHL point with an assist on April 8, 2006, against the Vancouver Canucks. In the 2006–07 season, Giordano played only five games in Omaha as he spent the majority of the campaign in Calgary. In 48 games with the Flames, he recorded 7 goals and 15 points. Giordano scored his first two NHL goals on October 14, 2006, against the Toronto Maple Leafs.

Unable to come to terms on a new contract with the Flames prior to the 2007–08 season, Giordano left the NHL to sign with HC Dynamo Moscow of the Russian Super League. According to Playfair, Giordano did not sign in Russia over money. Instead, he left because he felt he had proven what he could do in the AHL and, lacking a guarantee that he would be in the NHL, sought a higher-calibre league in which to play. He scored 4 goals and 13 points in 50 games with Dynamo, and played with the winning Canadian team at the 2007 Spengler Cup. The Canadian national team named him an alternate at the 2008 IIHF World Championship in case of injury to a roster player, however he never appeared in a game. Though he feared his decision to leave for Russia would damage his relationship with the Flames, Giordano and the team came to terms on a three-year contract that brought him back to Calgary for the 2008–09 season.

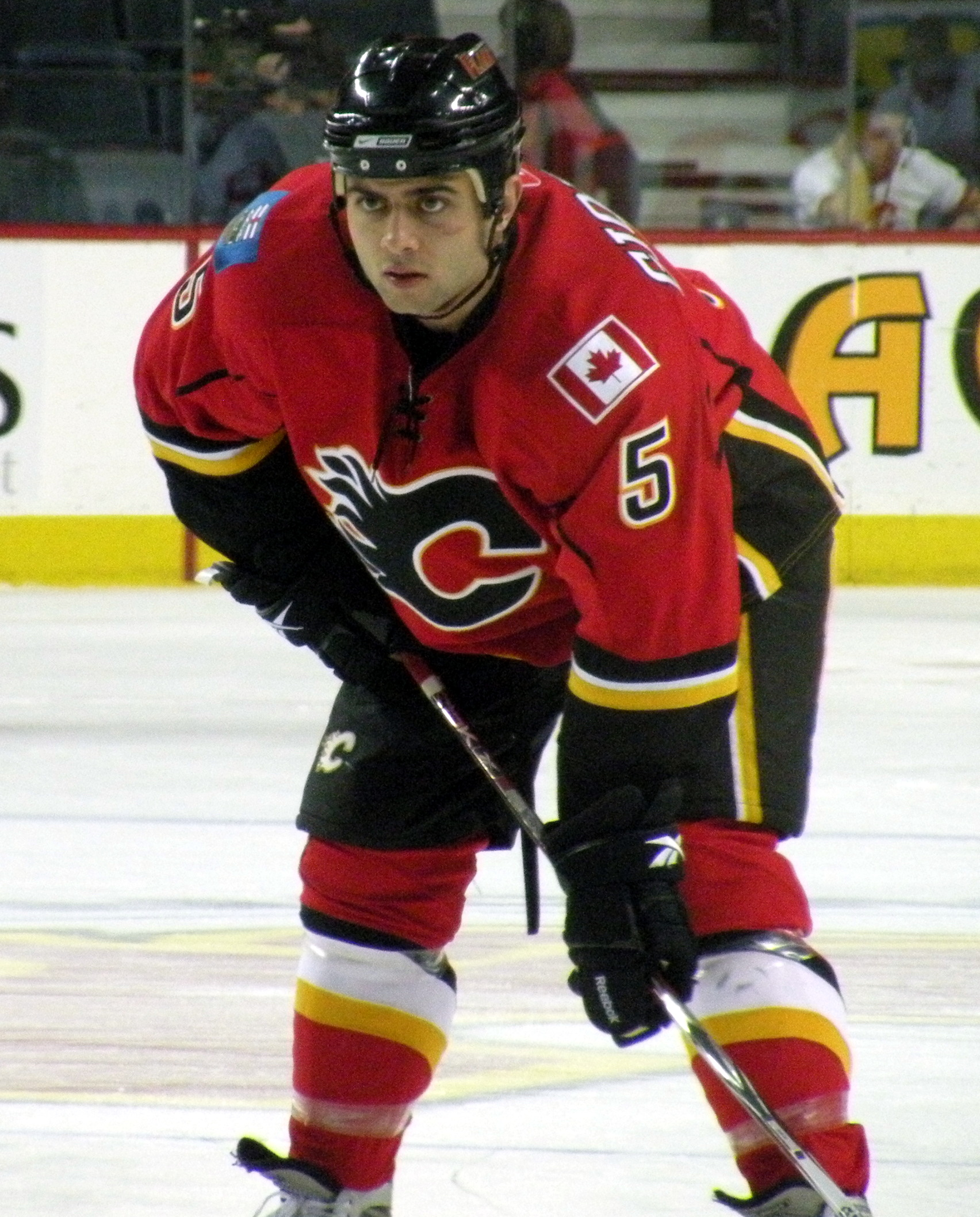
Giordano with the Flames, November 2008

Giordano appeared in 58 games for the Flames and scored 19 points before a shoulder injury ended his season. He required surgery to repair the damage suffered in a game against the Minnesota Wild. He recovered in time to begin the 2009–10 season, but several new additions to Calgary's defensive corps left him concerned about his position with the team. Instead, he solidified his place on the roster with a career year; Giordano set personal highs in goals (11), points (30) and was +17 for the Flames. The Hockey News named him one of the most underrated players in the league, and he was invited to join Team Canada at the 2010 IIHF World Championship. Giordano led the team's defencemen with three goals in the tournament and added an assist in seven games.

Despite having the option to become an unrestricted free agent following the 2010–11 season, Giordano opted to remain in Calgary and signed a five-year, $20 million contract extension with the Flames on October 29, 2010. He led the team's defencemen in scoring and set another career high with 43 points in 82 games. Giordano missed several weeks of the 2011–12 season after suffering a torn hamstring. The injury caused Giordano, who was named an alternate captain prior to the season's start, to miss 21 games. He finished with 27 points in 61 games, then scored 15 points in 47 games in the lockout-shortened 2012–13 season.

"You can say everything you want, but if you're not practising what you preach, then I'm not sure your guys are going to buy in as much as you want them to. But (Giordano) works a lot harder than he preaches. He's vocal and says all the right things in the room, but where he really shows he's a good leader on the ice, which is what guys need."

— Head Coach Bob Hartley describes Giordano's influence on his team as captain.

Giordano was named the 19th captain in Flames history on September 20, 2013, as he succeeded Jarome Iginla, who was traded late in the 2012–13 season. Giordano was praised by his teammates and coaching staff for both his long tenure with the franchise and for his playing style: Giordano played in all situations for the Flames, was one of the hardest workers on the team and was willing to sacrifice himself to block a shot or defend his teammates. Head coach Bob Hartley praised Giordano's influence on his teammates as the rebuilding Flames team established an identity as a squad which was noted across the league for its work ethic.

A blocked shot injured Giordano early in the 2013–14 season as he suffered a broken ankle in late October. He missed 18 games due to the injury, during which the Flames gained only five wins. He still recorded career highs of 13 goals and 47 points. Though he was not named to the team, Giordano's growing reputation placed him on Team Canada's short list for the 2014 Winter Olympics, and he received a first place vote (finishing 10th overall) in voting for the James Norris Memorial Trophy as the league's top defenceman.

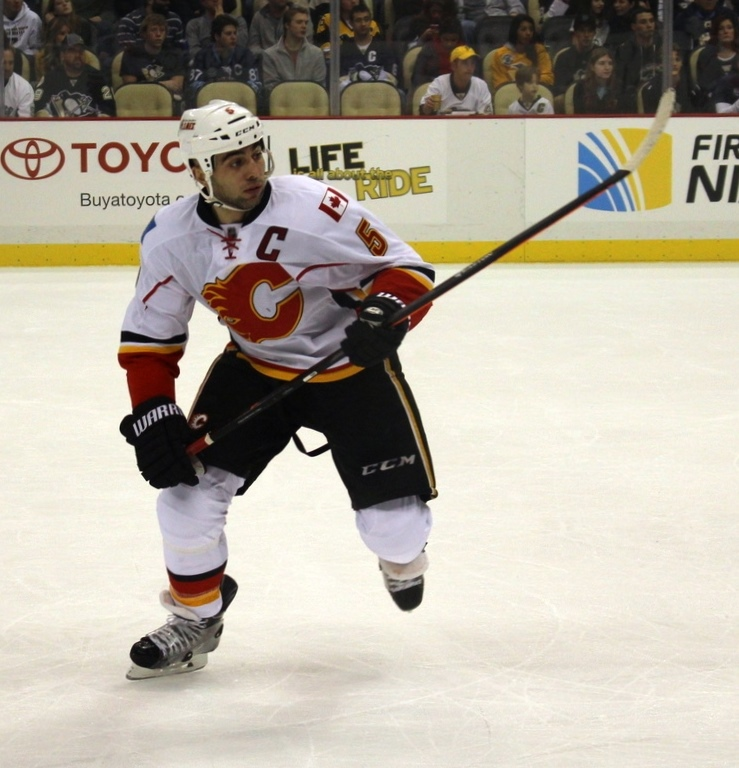
Giordano during a game against Pittsburgh, December 2013

A surge in offensive production from Giordano and fellow defencemen T. J. Brodie and Dennis Wideman resulted in the Flames being one of the NHL's biggest surprises early in the 2014–15 season. Predicted to finish near the bottom of the standings before the season, the Flames instead began December with one of the best records in the league, in large part due to the play of Giordano, who led all NHL defencemen with 25 points, four better than Brodie. His plus-minus of +14 ranked him second in the league. The NHL recognized Giordano's early season play by naming him its First Star of the month of November. He was subsequently named as the Flames' representative at the 60th National Hockey League All-Star Game. Giordano played his 500th career game on February 2, 2015, in a victory over the Winnipeg Jets. He set a personal best by scoring his 48th point of the season in a 3–1 win over the New Jersey Devils on February 25, but also suffered an injury in the game. The Flames announced one week later that he required surgery for a completely torn biceps tendon; the estimated recovery time of four to five months meant that his season was over. In the summer before the 2015–16 season, the Flames signed Giordano to a six-year contract extension.

During the 2016–17 season Giordano was placed on the same defensive pairing as Dougie Hamilton, causing greater defensive play in both players. His defensive play helped the Flames make the playoffs for the first time since 2015. He played in four playoff games, garnering one point, before the Flames were defeated by the Anaheim Ducks.

During the 2018–19 season, Giordano became the fifth defencemen in NHL history to record 60 points at the age of 35 or over. His 60th point came in a 2–1 win over the New Jersey Devils on February 27, 2019. Following the conclusion of the 2018–19 regular season, Giordano won the James Norris Memorial Trophy.

==== Seattle Kraken ====
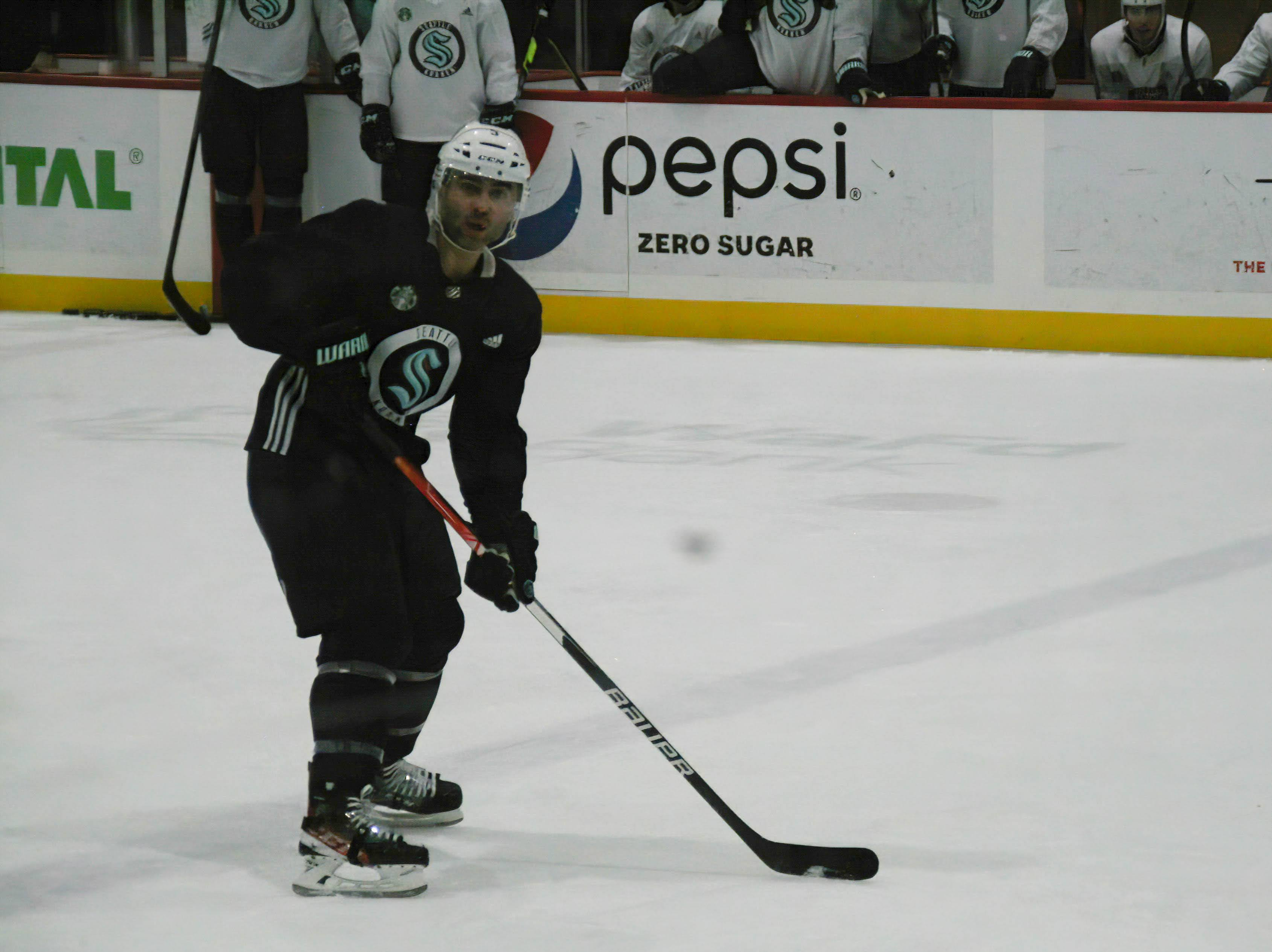
Giordano with the Kraken in 2022

On July 21, 2021, Giordano was selected from the Flames by the Seattle Kraken at the 2021 NHL expansion draft. Prior to the start of their inaugural season, Giordano was named the first captain in Kraken franchise history alongside alternates Adam Larsson, Yanni Gourde, Jordan Eberle, and Jaden Schwartz.

Giordano began the season playing alongside Jamie Oleksiak as the pair allowed 1.7 expected goals against per 60 minutes of play. By mid November, Giordano had recorded three goals and four assists while continuing to lead Seattle in average ice time. However, after testing positive for COVID-19 prior to a game against the Tampa Bay Lightning, Giordano spent 10 days isolated in a hotel before returning to the Kraken lineup on December 10. As a result of his overall play, Giordano was a candidate for the "Last Men In" for the 2022 NHL All-Star Game but was not selected by the fan vote.

On March 5, 2022, Giordano played his 1,000th NHL game, on the same day as Toronto Maple Leafs forward Wayne Simmonds' 1,000th game (they would later be teammates following Giordano's trade).

==== Toronto Maple Leafs and retirement ====
On March 20, 2022, a day before the trade deadline, Giordano was traded by Seattle with Colin Blackwell to his hometown Toronto Maple Leafs for a second-round pick in both 2022 and 2023, as well as a third-round pick in 2024. Giordano continued his strong play in Toronto as the team qualified for the postseason, although ultimately lost in the first round to the two-time defending cup champion Tampa Bay Lightning.

On May 22, 2022, Giordano was signed to a two-year, $1.6 million contract extension with the Maple Leafs, worth $800,000 annually. The deal was seen by analysts as a significant hometown discount for the cap-strapped club, several million dollars less than what Giordano would likely fetch in the summer off-season from competing teams. Giordano and the Maple Leafs had originally agreed in principle to a $1 million annual salary, but Giordano approached the club and asked the team to sign him to $800,000 annually (just over the veteran's minimum) to provide the team with more financial flexibility in icing a competitive, salary cap compliant team.

During the 2022–23 season, on February 26, 2023, Giordano passed Kris Russell for the most shots blocked in NHL history with 2,045 after blocking a shot by Carson Soucy against his previous team, the Seattle Kraken. He is now second in career blocked shots after being surpassed by Marc-Edouard Vlasic.

Ahead of the 2025–26 season, Giordano ended his playing career, opting to join the Maple Leafs' AHL affiliate, the Toronto Marlies, as a coaching advisor.

== Personal life ==
Giordano and his wife, Lauren, are spokespeople for Habitat for Humanity. They launched a program called "5-for-5" in January 2011 that aimed to build five homes for the organization, one in the Calgary area and four in Africa and Asia. Giordano donated $25,000 of the $130,000 cost himself, and his contribution was matched by the Flames charitable foundation. The team honoured him for his work with Habitat for Humanity and the Flames Foundation for Life by naming him the recipient of the J. R. "Bud" McCaig Award in 2012. Prior to the 2014–15 season, Giordano and his wife, Lauren, launched another initiative, known as the "Team Giordano Project", where they and the Flames' charitable arm donated funding to three Calgary schools to supply new gym equipment and computers, as well as to visit the schools and offer mentorship to the students. At the end of the 2016–17 season, Giordano was awarded the ESPN Muhammad Ali Sports Humanitarian Award for his charity work with "Team Giordano Project".

== Career statistics ==
=== Regular season and playoffs ===
			Regular season					Playoffs
Season	Team	League	GP	G	A	Pts	PIM	GP	G	A	Pts	PIM
2000–01	North York Rangers U18 AAA	Midget	—	—	—	—	—	—	—	—	—	—
2001–02	Brampton Capitals	OPJHL	48	11	26	37	59	—	—	—	—	—
2002–03	Owen Sound Attack	OHL	68	18	30	48	109	4	1	3	4	2
2003–04	Owen Sound Attack	OHL	65	14	35	49	72	7	1	3	4	5
2004–05	Lowell Lock Monsters	AHL	66	6	10	16	85	11	0	1	1	41
2005–06	Omaha Ak-Sar-Ben Knights	AHL	73	16	42	58	141	—	—	—	—	—
2005–06	Calgary Flames	NHL	7	0	1	1	8	—	—	—	—	—
2006–07	Calgary Flames	NHL	48	7	8	15	36	4	1	0	1	0
2006–07	Omaha Ak-Sar-Ben Knights	AHL	5	0	2	2	8	3	0	1	1	2
2007–08	Dynamo Moscow	RSL	50	4	9	13	89	—	—	—	—	—
2008–09	Calgary Flames	NHL	58	2	17	19	59	—	—	—	—	—
2009–10	Calgary Flames	NHL	81	11	19	30	81	—	—	—	—	—
2010–11	Calgary Flames	NHL	82	8	35	43	67	—	—	—	—	—
2011–12	Calgary Flames	NHL	61	9	18	27	75	—	—	—	—	—
2012–13	Calgary Flames	NHL	47	4	11	15	40	—	—	—	—	—
2013–14	Calgary Flames	NHL	64	14	33	47	63	—	—	—	—	—
2014–15	Calgary Flames	NHL	61	11	37	48	37	—	—	—	—	—
2015–16	Calgary Flames	NHL	82	21	35	56	54	—	—	—	—	—
2016–17	Calgary Flames	NHL	81	12	27	39	59	4	0	1	1	2
2017–18	Calgary Flames	NHL	82	13	25	38	63	—	—	—	—	—
2018–19	Calgary Flames	NHL	78	17	57	74	69	5	0	2	2	0
2019–20	Calgary Flames	NHL	61	5	26	31	34	10	0	3	3	12
2020–21	Calgary Flames	NHL	56	9	17	26	14	—	—	—	—	—
2021–22	Seattle Kraken	NHL	55	6	17	23	47	—	—	—	—	—
2021–22	Toronto Maple Leafs	NHL	20	2	10	12	10	7	0	2	2	6
2022–23	Toronto Maple Leafs	NHL	78	4	20	24	53	11	0	2	2	7
2023–24	Toronto Maple Leafs	NHL	46	3	6	9	49	—	—	—	—	—
NHL totals			1,148	158	419	577	918	41	1	10	11	27

=== International ===
Year	Team	Event	Result	GP	G	A	Pts	PIM
2010	Canada	WC	7th	7	3	1	4	10
Senior totals				7	3	1	4	10

== Awards and honours ==
Career awards and honours
Award	Year	Ref
OHL
OHL First All-Rookie Team	2002–03	
NHL
NHL All-Star	2015, 2016, 2020	
NHL Foundation Player Award	2016	
James Norris Memorial Trophy	2019	
NHL First All-Star Team	2019	
Mark Messier Leadership Award	2020	
Other
J. R. "Bud" McCaig Award	2011–12	
Ralph T. Scurfield Humanitarian Award	2015–16	
ESPY Muhammad Ali Humanitarian Award	2017	

Sporting positions
Preceded by Jarome Iginla	Calgary Flames captain 2013–2021	Succeeded by Mikael Backlund
Preceded by Position created	Seattle Kraken captain 2021–2022	Succeeded by Jordan Eberle
Awards and achievements
Preceded by Victor Hedman	James Norris Memorial Trophy winner 2019	Succeeded by Roman Josi
