= King Clancy Memorial Trophy =

National Hockey League (NHL) trophy

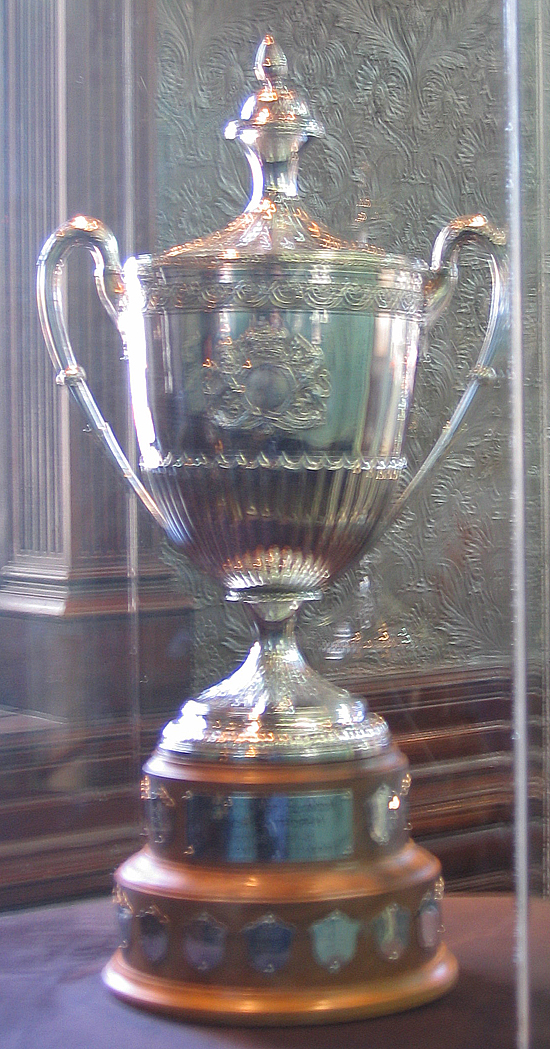
- Sport: Ice hockey
- Awarded for: National Hockey League player who best exemplifies leadership qualities on and off the ice and who has made a significant humanitarian contribution in his community

History
- First award: 1987–88 NHL season
- First winner: Lanny McDonald
- Most wins: Henrik Sedin (2)
- Most recent: Marcus Foligno; Minnesota Wild

The King Clancy Memorial Trophy is a sports award given annually to the National Hockey League (NHL) player who best exemplifies leadership qualities on and off the ice and who has made a significant humanitarian contribution to his community. The winner is chosen by "a special panel of representatives" from the Professional Hockey Writers' Association and the NHL Broadcasters' Association.

The trophy is named in honour of Francis M. "King" Clancy, a former player for the original Ottawa Senators and the Toronto Maple Leafs who later went on to become a coach, referee, and team executive. The trophy was first awarded in 1988 and was presented to the NHL by Maple Leafs owner Harold Ballard, who called Clancy "one of the greatest humanitarians that ever lived". It honours similar community service as the Charlie Conacher Humanitarian Award, which was retired in 1984.

Five teams have had more than one player win the award. Three members of the Vancouver Canucks, Edmonton Oilers, Calgary Flames, New York Islanders, and Boston Bruins have won the award, while two members of the Minnesota Wild, and Detroit Red Wings have also won the award. Ray Bourque and Dave Poulin won it in consecutive years for the Boston Bruins, and Jason Zucker and Matt Dumba won it in consecutive years for the Minnesota Wild. Players from the seven different Canadian teams have won the trophy on 10 of the 28 occasions that it has been awarded. Three members each from the Edmonton Oilers, Calgary Flames, and Vancouver Canucks, as well as one each from the Montreal Canadiens, Ottawa Senators, Toronto Maple Leafs, and the original Winnipeg Jets have won the award. Henrik Sedin is the only player who has won it more than once. Henrik and his brother Daniel are the only recipients to have won the trophy jointly.

The similar NHL Foundation Player Award was discontinued for the 2017–18 NHL season, with its associated charitable donation being redirected towards the King Clancy Memorial Trophy instead.

== Winners ==
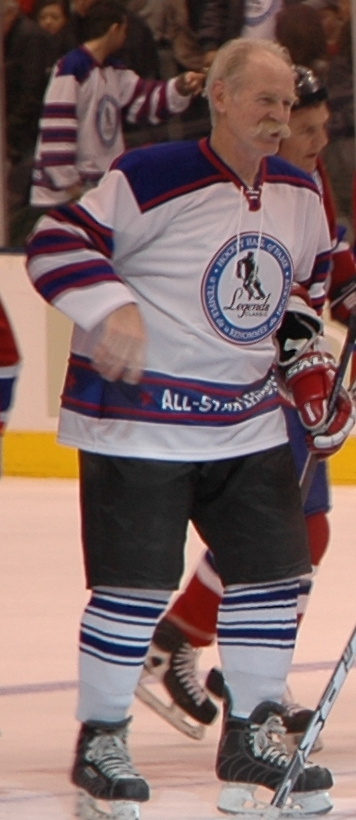
Lanny McDonald, inaugural winner

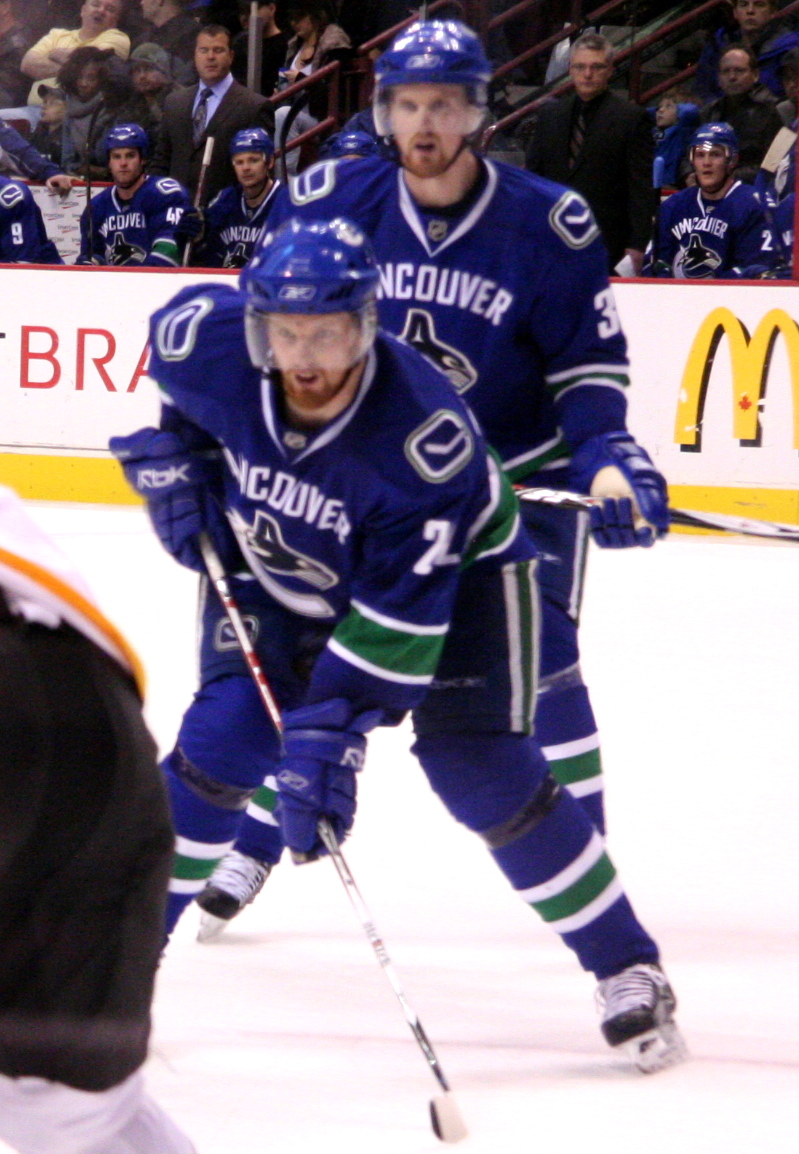
Henrik (top) and Daniel Sedin, 2018 winners. Henrik also won in 2016, making him the only player to win the trophy more than once.

^	Denotes player who is still active in the NHL
*	Denotes player inducted into the Hockey Hall of Fame
~	Denotes inactive player not yet eligible for Hockey Hall of Fame consideration
†	Denotes player whose team won the Stanley Cup that year
Player (X)	Denotes the number of times the player had won the King Clancy Memorial Trophy at that time

Season	Winner	Team	Player's humanitarian contribution
1987–88	Lanny McDonald*	Calgary Flames	Supporter of numerous charities in Toronto and Calgary.
1988–89	Bryan Trottier*	New York Islanders	Worked with numerous charities, including the Special Olympics, the Long Island "Just Say No to Drugs" program, and the Make-A-Wish Foundation.
1989–90†	Kevin Lowe*	Edmonton Oilers	Although very busy as a player and with the NHLPA, he was made the honorary Chairman of the Edmonton City Christmas Bureau, a charity which fed needy persons.
1990–91	Dave Taylor	Los Angeles Kings	Did a considerable amount of charity work with his team, and also assisted persons with speech impediments, as he had previously overcome one.
1991–92	Ray Bourque*	Boston Bruins	Involved in numerous charities; he was most notably the honourable chairman for Boston's Floating Hospital for Infants and Children.
1992–93	Dave Poulin	Boston Bruins	Spent a considerable amount of time helping charities; he was co-chairman of the March of Dimes "Walk for Life" fundraiser.
1993–94†	Adam Graves	New York Rangers	Was previously recognized by his team and city for his extensive community work. He most notably served as Celebrity Chairman of New York's Family Dynamic program, a charity which assists abused children.
1994–95	Joe Nieuwendyk*	Calgary Flames	Was the captain of the Flames, and was leader in most of the Flames' charitable and humanitarian efforts.
1995–96	Kris King	Winnipeg Jets	Was the Jets' captain as well as a major participant in various charitable organizations.
1996–97	Trevor Linden	Vancouver Canucks	Started a program called the "Captain's Crew", which allowed underprivileged children to attend games in a private suite as his guest.
1997–98	Kelly Chase	St. Louis Blues	Heavily involved with the Gateway Project, which helped mentally challenged children get involved in various sports.
1998–99	Rob Ray	Buffalo Sabres	Involved with many charities, including the March of Dimes, the Make-a-Wish Foundation, Walk America and the Roswell Cancer Institute and Children's hospital.
1999–2000	Curtis Joseph	Toronto Maple Leafs	Worked mainly with sick children; he started "Cujo's Kids", which placed children with illnesses in a luxury suite at a Leafs game; also created "Cujo's Crease", a special room in the Sick Kids Hospital in Toronto which resembled the Leafs' dressing room.
2000–01†	Shjon Podein	Colorado Avalanche	Founded the Shjon Podein Children's Foundation, which assists sick and underprivileged children.
2001–02	Ron Francis*	Carolina Hurricanes	Involved in a program with Duke Children's Hospital in Durham, North Carolina that helps children.
2002–03	Brendan Shanahan*	Detroit Red Wings	Started a program that assists with the purchase and installation of smoke detectors for low-income households.
2003–04	Jarome Iginla*	Calgary Flames	Involved in all of the Flames' community programs, and donated 1,000 dollars for every goal he scored.
2004–05 (Note: Not awarded due to 2004–05 NHL lockout)	—	—	—
2005–06	Olaf Kolzig	Washington Capitals	Co-founded "Athletes against Autism" after discovering that his son, Carson, had autism; also involved with numerous other charities.
2006–07	Saku Koivu	Montreal Canadiens	After recovering from cancer, he founded the Saku Koivu Foundation in 2002, which had raised around 2.5 million dollars when Koivu was awarded.
2007–08	Vincent Lecavalier	Tampa Bay Lightning	Work with the Vincent Lecavalier Foundation.
2008–09	Ethan Moreau	Edmonton Oilers	Edmonton Oilers Community Foundation's (EOCF) Inner City High School project.
2009–10	Shane Doan	Phoenix Coyotes	Involved in numerous Phoenix-area charities.
2010–11	Doug Weight	New York Islanders	Provided positive leadership within the Islander dressing room despite being hampered by a back injury that limited the team captain to 18 games.
2011–12	Daniel Alfredsson*	Ottawa Senators	Over his 15 seasons with the Senators, Alfredsson has contributed to many local charities and causes, becoming a staple in the community.
2012–13	Patrice Bergeron*	Boston Bruins	The Bruins' alternate captain has been involved in many charitable programs. Bergeron's "Patrice's Pals" program brings hospital patients and children's groups to watch Bruins games from a luxury suite.
2013–14	Andrew Ference	Edmonton Oilers	The Oilers' captain has been involved in many charitable programs. Ference heads up the November Project in Edmonton, a movement to increase activity in the community.
2014–15	Henrik Zetterberg	Detroit Red Wings	The Red Wings' captain and his wife, Emma, give back to the Metro Detroit community through numerous initiatives as well as international causes in Ethiopia, Guatemala and Nepal.
2015–16	Henrik Sedin* (1)	Vancouver Canucks	The Canucks' captain is heavily involved in many charitable programs put on by the Canucks. In 2010, he and his brother, Daniel Sedin, donated $1.5 million to the BC Children's Hospital. In 2015, he and Daniel announced that they would be funding "Clubhouse 36", an after-school program for at-risk students in a nearby city. The Sedin twins also established the Sedin Family Foundation in 2014.
2016–17	Nick Foligno^	Columbus Blue Jackets	Nick Foligno and wife, Janelle, donated $1 million to Children's hospitals in Columbus and Boston. Foligno also supports the Janis Foligno Foundation, in memory of his mother, who died due to cancer in 2009.
2017–18	Daniel Sedin*	Vancouver Canucks	In their final season, the Sedin twins became the first duo to win the award. The Sedins contributed greatly to countless charitable programs created by both the Canucks and themselves over the course of 18 years. One of which was helping raise $42 million for the Canucks for Kids fund since 2000. Their win was a career achievement award, honouring the Sedins for both their on-ice and off-ice efforts over their careers.
2017–18	Henrik Sedin* (2)	Vancouver Canucks	In their final season, the Sedin twins became the first duo to win the award. The Sedins contributed greatly to countless charitable programs created by both the Canucks and themselves over the course of 18 years. One of which was helping raise $42 million for the Canucks for Kids fund since 2000. Their win was a career achievement award, honouring the Sedins for both their on-ice and off-ice efforts over their careers.
2018–19	Jason Zucker^	Minnesota Wild	Zucker and his wife Carly began a campaign in 2017–18 to raise funds for the Zucker Family Suite and Broadcast Studio at the University of Minnesota Masonic Children's Hospital in Minneapolis. The #GIVE16 campaign started with a $160,000 donation by the Zuckers and has raised over $1.2 million.
2019–20	Matt Dumba	Minnesota Wild	Dumba was one of the founding members of the Hockey Diversity Alliance, an initiative dedicated to eradicating systemic racism and intolerance in hockey. Additionally, Dumba helped to spearhead the "Rebuild Minnesota" initiative to assist local businesses affected in the wake of the George Floyd protests, assisted over 60 families in need during the COVID-19 pandemic, donated more than $11,000 to Australia wildfire relief, and was an active participant in Minneapolis' Athletes Committed to Educating Students.
2020–21	Pekka Rinne*	Nashville Predators	Rinne, along with former teammate Shea Weber, helped to launch the 365 Fund, which cooperates with Monroe Carell Jr. Children's Hospital at Vanderbilt to raise funds and awareness for cancer research, starting in 2012–13. The fund has raised over $3 million since its inception. Additionally, Rinne fully funded a suite at Bridgestone Arena under the 365 Fund, which accommodates guests and family members from the children's hospital. He also participated in the Predators' "Feed the Frontline" fund, which supplied meals to frontline workers during the COVID-19 pandemic.
2021–22	P.K. Subban	New Jersey Devils	Subban donated $1 million in support of Le Spot, a mental health clinic in Montreal, and matched donations up to $100,000 to help Ukrainian cancer patients who arrived for life-saving treatments. Subban is also the founder of P.K. Subban Foundation as well as Blueline Buddies, and served as co-chair for the NHL's Player Inclusion Committee. He also committed himself throughout the season to racial and social justice, underserved youth, COVID-19 relief and youth hockey.
2022–23	Mikael Backlund^	Calgary Flames	He supports the ALS Society of Alberta in honor of his mother-in-law, who succumbed to the disease. As an ambassador for both Kids Cancer Care and Special Olympics Calgary, Backlund has invited an additional 500 guests to attend Flames games and meet with him afterward. Backlund and his wife partnered with Parachutes for Pets to create Lily's Legacy, named after their dog who died in 2021. This first-of-its-kind program allows children in foster care to keep their pets while they are transitioning into care.
2023–24	Anders Lee^	New York Islanders	Among the charities Lee helps is the Jam Kancer in the Kan Foundation, hosting events to help raise money in the fight against cancer. Lee's 2023 Jam Kancer in the Kan tournament raised more than $155,000, including a $30,000 contribution by Lee.
2024–25†	Aleksander Barkov^	Florida Panthers	The Panthers' captain, through his six-year partnership with Joe DiMaggio Children's Hospital, has donated $1,600 for every goal he scores, as well as $800 for every assist. To date, Barkov has donated $420,000 to the hospital. Barkov also makes frequent visits to the hospital to visit patients too ill to leave the hospital.
2025–26	Marcus Foligno^	Minnesota Wild	Foligno and his brother Nick teamed with the NHL, the NHLPA, the Wild, the Chicago Blackhawks, and the V Foundation to create the Foligno Face-Off. The initiative raised more than $200,000 to fund breast cancer research across North America, in honor of their mother, Janis, who died from breast cancer in 2009.
