= NHL Foundation Player Award =

Defunct National Hockey League award

- Sport: Ice hockey
- Awarded for: NHL player who applies the core values of hockey—commitment, perseverance and teamwork—to enrich the lives of people in his community

History
- First award: 1997–98 NHL season
- Final award: 2016–17 NHL season
- First winner: Kelly Chase
- Most recent: Travis Hamonic

The NHL Foundation Player Award was awarded annually to the National Hockey League (NHL) player "who applies the core values of [ice] hockey—commitment, perseverance and teamwork—to enrich the lives of people in his community". The winner is given a grant of US$ 25,000 to help causes that the winner supports. Many players have been awarded as a result of large charitable contributions to their community. For instance, Vincent Lecavalier received the award in 2008 for committing US$3 million to build The Vincent Lecavalier Pediatric Cancer and Blood Disorder Center at All Children's Hospital in St. Petersburg, Florida.

Fifteen players won the NHL Foundation Player Award during its existence. Kelly Chase was awarded the inaugural NHL Foundation Player Award in 1998. No player has ever won the award twice. The Buffalo Sabres, Calgary Flames and the Detroit Red Wings are the only teams to have been represented twice by winners. The award is closely related to the King Clancy Memorial Trophy, as both are awarded to a player who has made a significant humanitarian contribution to his community. German Olaf Kolzig, Swede Henrik Zetterberg and Americans Ryan Miller and Dustin Brown are the only non-Canadian winners, while Ron Francis and Joe Sakic are the only winners to have been elected into the Hockey Hall of Fame.

The award was discontinued for the 2017–18 NHL season, with the associated charitable donation being redirected towards the King Clancy Memorial Trophy.

== Winners ==
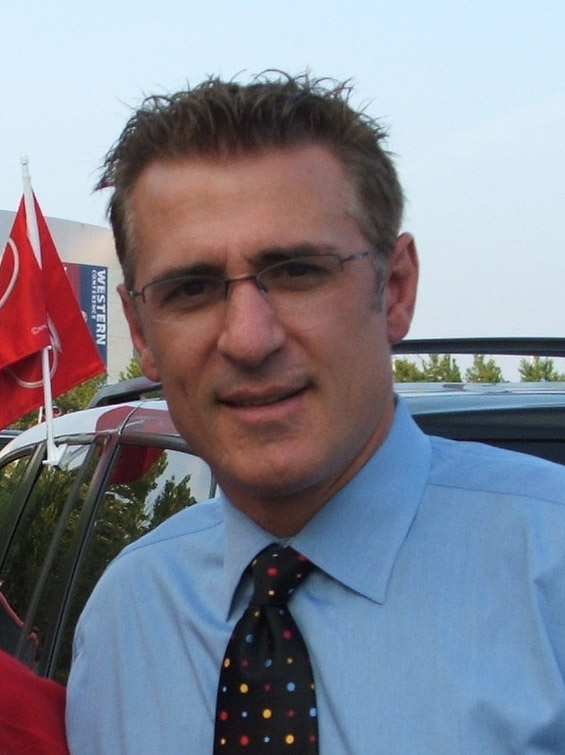
Ron Francis won the award in 2002.

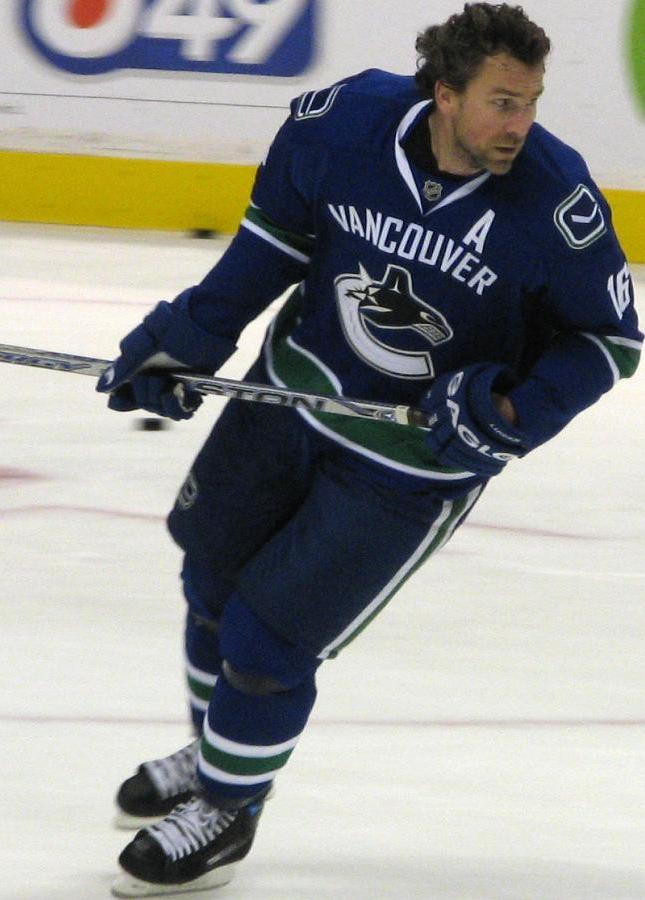
Trevor Linden won the award in 2008.

*	Denotes players who are still active
†	Elected to the Hockey Hall of Fame

Season	Winner	Position	Team	Note
1997–98	Kelly Chase	Right wing	St. Louis Blues	
1998–99	Rob Ray	Right wing	Buffalo Sabres	1
1999–2000	Adam Graves	Left wing	New York Rangers	
2000–01	Olaf Kolzig	Goaltender	Washington Capitals	
2001–02	Ron Francis†	Center	Carolina Hurricanes	
2002–03	Darren McCarty	Right wing	Detroit Red Wings	
2003–04	Jarome Iginla†	Right wing	Calgary Flames	
2004–05^{[a]}	—			
2005–06	Marty Turco	Goaltender	Dallas Stars	
2006–07	Joe Sakic†	Center	Colorado Avalanche	
2007–08^{[b]}	Vincent Lecavalier	Center	Tampa Bay Lightning	
2007–08^{[b]}	Trevor Linden	Right wing	Vancouver Canucks	
2008–09	Rick Nash	Left wing	Columbus Blue Jackets	
2009–10	Ryan Miller	Goaltender	Buffalo Sabres	
2010–11	Dustin Brown	Right wing	Los Angeles Kings	
2011–12	Mike Fisher	Centre	Nashville Predators	
2012–13	Henrik Zetterberg	Centre	Detroit Red Wings	
2013–14	Patrice Bergeron†	Centre	Boston Bruins	
2014–15	Brent Burns*	Defenceman	San Jose Sharks	
2015–16	Mark Giordano	Defenceman	Calgary Flames	
2016–17	Travis Hamonic*	Defenceman	New York Islanders	

Notes

- ^{a} No award was presented due to the 2004–05 NHL lockout.
- ^{b} Denotes joint winners
