= Mocek =

Mocek is a surname. Notable people with the surname include:

- Gregory Mocek (born 1962), American government official
- Petr Mocek (born 1980), Czech ice hockey player
- Sławomir Mocek (born 1976), Polish fencer
- Łukasz Mocek (born 1976), Polish businessman, co-founder of MOCEK, a manufacturer of pellet boilers
- Paweł Mocek (born, 1989), Polish businessman, co-founder of MOCEK, a manufacturer of pellet boilers
