= Jan Šeda (ice hockey) =

Czech ice hockey player

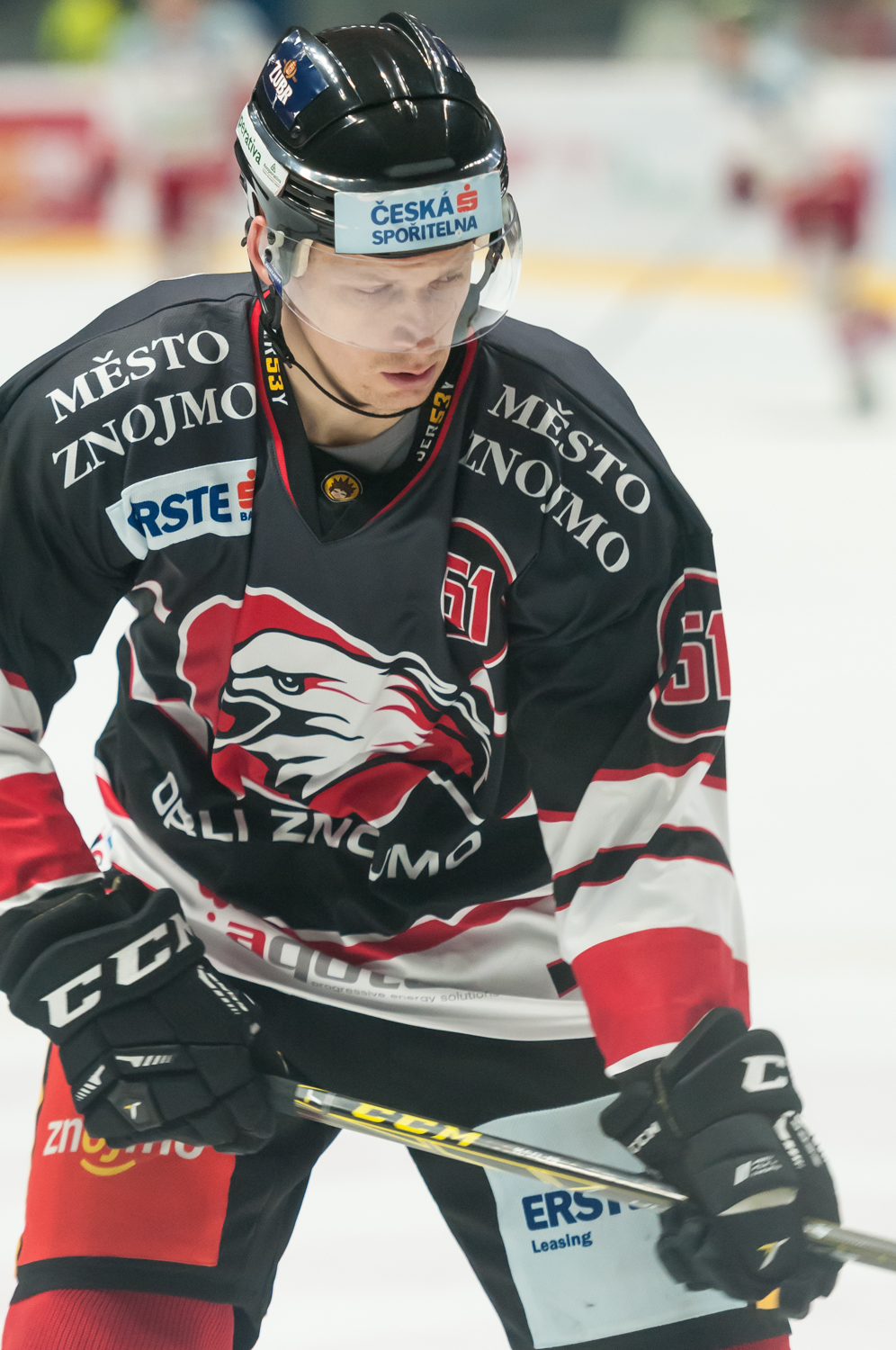
- Born: April 11, 1985 (age 40) Pardubice, Czechoslovakia
- Height: 6 ft 0 in (183 cm)
- Weight: 185 lb (84 kg; 13 st 3 lb)
- Position: Centre
- Shot: Left
- Played for: HC Pardubice; HC Hradec Králové; HC Chrudim; Orli Znojmo; Naprzod Janow
- Playing career: 2005–2018

Jan Šeda (born April 11, 1985) is a Czech former professional ice hockey player who last played for Naprzod Janow in the Polska Hokej Liga. He previously played with HC Pardubice in the Czech Extraliga during the 2010–11 Czech Extraliga season.

== Career statistics ==
			Regular season					Playoffs
Season	Team	League	GP	G	A	Pts	PIM	GP	G	A	Pts	PIM
1999–00	HC Pardubice U18	Czech U18	9	0	0	0	4	—	—	—	—	—
2000–01	HC Pardubice U18	Czech U18	48	12	6	18	48	7	3	2	5	6
2001–02	HC Pardubice U18	Czech U18	33	24	24	48	46	—	—	—	—	—
2002–03	HC Pardubice U20	Czech U20	44	8	8	16	46	—	—	—	—	—
2003–04	HC Pardubice U20	Czech U20	54	17	24	41	44	—	—	—	—	—
2004–05	HC Pardubice U20	Czech U20	41	18	12	30	84	2	0	1	1	2
2005–06	HC Pardubice U20	Czech U20	23	7	9	16	20	—	—	—	—	—
2005–06	HC Pardubice	Czech	7	0	0	0	0	—	—	—	—	—
2005–06	HC Hradec Králové	Czech2	29	4	7	11	16	8	2	1	3	8
2006–07	HC Pardubice	Czech	2	0	0	0	0	—	—	—	—	—
2006–07	HC Hradec Králové	Czech2	46	4	11	15	40	—	—	—	—	—
2006–07	HC Chrudim	Czech3	3	2	0	2	29	3	0	0	0	2
2007–08	HC Hradec Králové	Czech2	42	8	7	15	24	11	6	4	10	14
2007–08	HC Chrudim	Czech3	4	1	0	1	14	4	0	0	0	2
2008–09	HC Chrudim	Czech2	46	11	22	33	42	3	0	1	1	4
2009–10	HC Chrudim	Czech2	46	15	18	33	42	—	—	—	—	—
2010–11	HC Pardubice	Czech	3	0	0	0	0	—	—	—	—	—
2010–11	HC Chrudim	Czech2	44	13	13	26	50	—	—	—	—	—
2011–12	Orli Znojmo	EBEL	38	8	8	16	44	4	2	0	2	8
2012–13	Orli Znojmo	EBEL	49	12	14	26	38	5	0	0	0	14
2013–14	Orli Znojmo	EBEL	52	3	11	14	50	5	1	2	3	2
2014–15	Orli Znojmo	EBEL	49	9	10	19	44	5	0	1	1	4
2015–16	Orli Znojmo	EBEL	22	1	2	3	6	3	0	0	0	2
2016–17	Orli Znojmo	EBEL	51	3	8	11	26	4	0	0	0	6
2017–18	Naprzod Janow	Poland	37	9	13	22	34	6	1	1	2	16
Czech totals			12	0	0	0	0	—	—	—	—	—
Czech2 totals			253	55	78	133	232	26	10	7	17	30
EBEL totals			261	36	53	89	208	26	3	3	6	36
