= Martin Vagner =

Czech ice hockey player (born 1984)

- Born: 16 March 1984 (age 42) Jaroměř, Czechoslovakia
- Height: 6 ft 1 in (185 cm)
- Weight: 189 lb (86 kg; 13 st 7 lb)
- Position: Defence
- Shoots: Left
- 1.CZE team Former teams: HC Hradec Králové; HC Pardubice; HC České Budějovice; HC Slovan Ústečtí Lvi; HC Chrudim; HC Olomouc; HC Oceláři Třinec
- NHL draft: 26th overall, 2002; Dallas Stars; 268th overall, 2004; Carolina Hurricanes
- Playing career: 2005–present

Martin Vagner (born 16 March 1984) is a Czech ice hockey defenceman currently playing with HC Hradec Králové of the 1. národní hokejová liga. He was drafted in the first round, 26th overall, by the Dallas Stars in the 2002 NHL entry draft. He re-entered the draft, however, in 2004 and was selected in the ninth round, 268th overall, by the Carolina Hurricanes. He has yet to play in the National Hockey League, spending his career to date in the Czech Extraliga.

== Career statistics ==
=== Regular season and playoffs ===
			Regular season					Playoffs
Season	Team	League	GP	G	A	Pts	PIM	GP	G	A	Pts	PIM
2000–01	HC IPB Pojišťovna Pardubice	CZE U20	45	1	10	11	38	7	0	2	2	6
2001–02	Hull Olympiques	QMJHL	64	6	28	34	81	8	0	1	1	10
2002–03	Hull Olympiques	QMJHL	53	1	12	13	98	20	1	4	5	38
2003–04	Gatineau Olympiques	QMJHL	38	6	12	18	85	13	0	3	3	16
2004–05	Acadie–Bathurst Titan	QMJHL	48	3	10	13	84	—	—	—	—	—
2005–06	HC Moeller Pardubice	ELH	36	0	0	0	14	—	—	—	—	—
2005–06	HC VČE Hradec Králové, a.s.	CZE.2	12	0	1	1	12	—	—	—	—	—
2006–07	HC České Budějovice	ELH	40	0	0	0	20	3	0	0	0	0
2007–08	HC Slovan Ústečtí Lvi	ELH	35	1	3	4	30	—	—	—	—	—
2008–09	HC Slovan Ústečtí Lvi	CZE.2	19	0	1	1	8	—	—	—	—	—
2008–09	HC Chrudim	CZE.2	18	1	4	5	26	—	—	—	—	—
2008–09	HC Děčín	CZE.3	6	0	0	0	4	—	—	—	—	—
2008–09	HC Olomouc	CZE.2	—	—	—	—	—	8	2	0	2	2
2009–10	HC Chrudim	CZE.2	29	0	5	5	30	—	—	—	—	—
2010–11	HC Oceláři Třinec	ELH	15	1	1	2	2	—	—	—	—	—
2010–11	HC VCES Hradec Králové, a.s.	CZE.2	21	1	3	4	26	9	0	1	1	8
2011–12	HC VCES Hradec Králové, a.s.	CZE.2	43	4	7	11	46	7	0	1	1	10
2012–13	Královští lvi Hradec Králové, a.s.	CZE.2	49	3	7	10	80	6	0	1	1	8
2013–14	HC Rebel Havlíčkův Brod	CZE.2	40	1	6	7	46	5	0	0	0	0
2014–15	HC Slovan Ústí nad Labem	CZE.2	50	1	18	19	44	10	1	2	3	10
2015–16	HC Slovan Ústí nad Labem	CZE.2	28	2	11	13	58	15	1	1	2	18
2016–17	HC Slovan Ústí nad Labem	CZE.2	51	3	16	19	28	4	1	0	1	0
2017–18	HC Slovan Ústí nad Labem	CZE.2	42	2	18	20	30	—	—	—	—	—
2018–19	HC Slovan Ústí nad Labem	CZE.2	17	2	6	8	8	—	—	—	—	—
2018–19	HC Stadion Vrchlabí	CZE.3	15	4	3	7	6	12	1	3	4	12
2019–20	HC Stadion Vrchlabí	CZE.3	29	2	14	16	10	—	—	—	—	—
2019–20	HC Slovan Ústí nad Labem	CZE.2	9	0	3	3	6	—	—	—	—	—
2021–22	HC Jaroměř	CZE.4	13	1	8	9	6	5	0	3	3	2
ELH totals			126	2	4	6	66	3	0	0	0	0
CZE.2 totals			428	20	106	126	448	64	5	6	11	56

=== International ===
Year	Team	Event	GP	G	A	Pts	PIM
2004	Czech Republic	WJC	7	0	0	0	14
Junior totals			7	0	0	0	14

Preceded by Jason Bacashihua	Dallas Stars first round draft pick 2002	Succeeded by Mark Fistric
