= Steve Ott =

Canadian ice hockey player (born 1982)

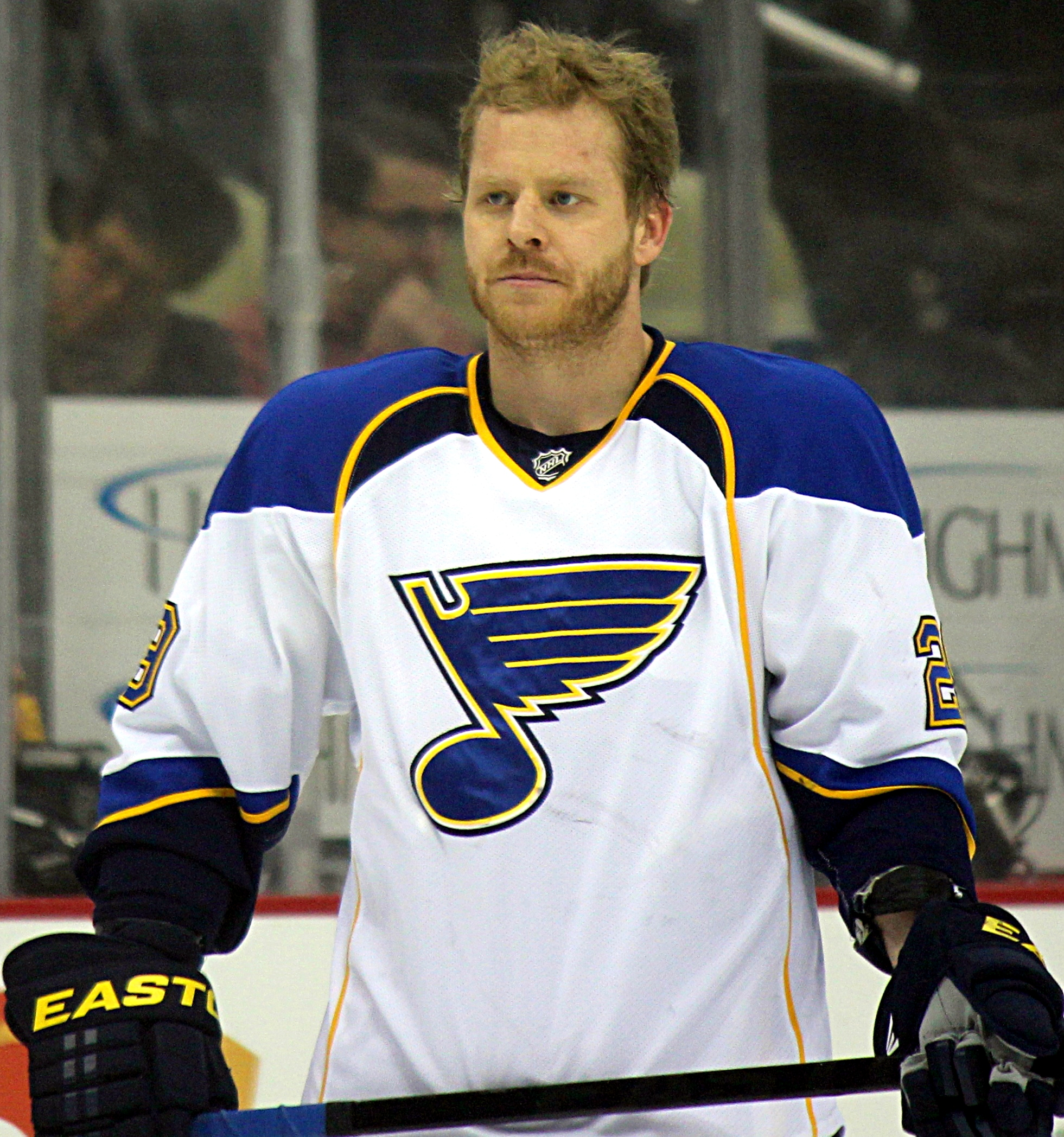
- Ott with the St. Louis Blues in 2014
- Born: August 19, 1982 (age 44) Summerside, Prince Edward Island, Canada
- Height: 6 ft 0 in (183 cm)
- Weight: 193 lb (88 kg; 13 st 11 lb)
- Position: Centre
- Shot: Left
- Played for: Dallas Stars; Buffalo Sabres; St. Louis Blues; Detroit Red Wings; Montreal Canadiens
- National team: Canada
- NHL draft: 25th overall, 2000; Dallas Stars
- Playing career: 2002–2017

Steven Bradley Ott (born August 19, 1982) is a Canadian former professional ice hockey centre and current head coach of the Springfield Thunderbirds of the American Hockey League (AHL). He was selected in the first round, 25th overall, by the Dallas Stars in the 2000 NHL entry draft. Ott also previously played for the Buffalo Sabres, St. Louis Blues, Detroit Red Wings and Montreal Canadiens.

== Playing career ==
=== Early career and years in Dallas ===
Born in Summerside, Prince Edward Island, Ott later moved to Stoney Point, Ontario. He played his minor hockey with the Sun County Panthers of the Ontario Minor Hockey Association (OMHA) and the Belle River Canadiens (Great Lakes Junior C Hockey League) in the mid-1990s before signing for the 1998–99 season with the Leamington Flyers Junior B club (WOJHL). After a solid season, Ott was selected in the second round, 41st overall, of the 1998 OHL Priority Selection by the Windsor Spitfires.

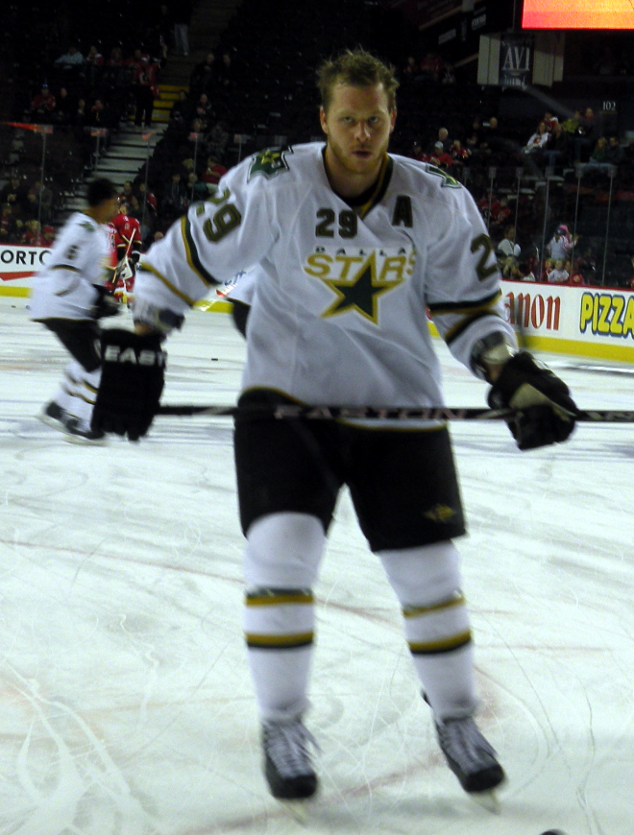
Ott with the Stars in October 2009

Ott was a first round draft pick of the Dallas Stars, 25th overall, at the 2000 NHL entry draft. He then played junior hockey for the OHL's Windsor Spitfires and had a brief spell with the Utah Grizzlies of the American Hockey League (AHL) before joining the Stars' NHL roster.

Ott represented Canada at the 2001 World Junior Hockey Championship, helping the team win the bronze medal. As part of his "peskiness", he learned and memorized offensive phrases in other languages to strategically annoy his opponents on the ice in a language they could understand. During the 2004–05 NHL lockout, Ott played for the Hamilton Bulldogs of the AHL, where he set a team record for penalty minutes in a season with 279.

In the 2007–08 season, Ott was suspended by the NHL for three games for a hit to the head of Jordan Leopold of the Colorado Avalanche during a game on March 9, 2008. Ott also played in 18 playoff games for the Stars during their run to the Western Conference Final.

Ott was suspended one game by the NHL on March 1, 2009, for an incident during a game on February 28, 2009, against the Anaheim Ducks, where he received a match penalty for eye gouging Travis Moen. Ott claimed the eye gouge was accidental.

During the 2009–10 season, on March 31, 2010, Ott scored his first NHL career hat-trick at home against the San Jose Sharks.

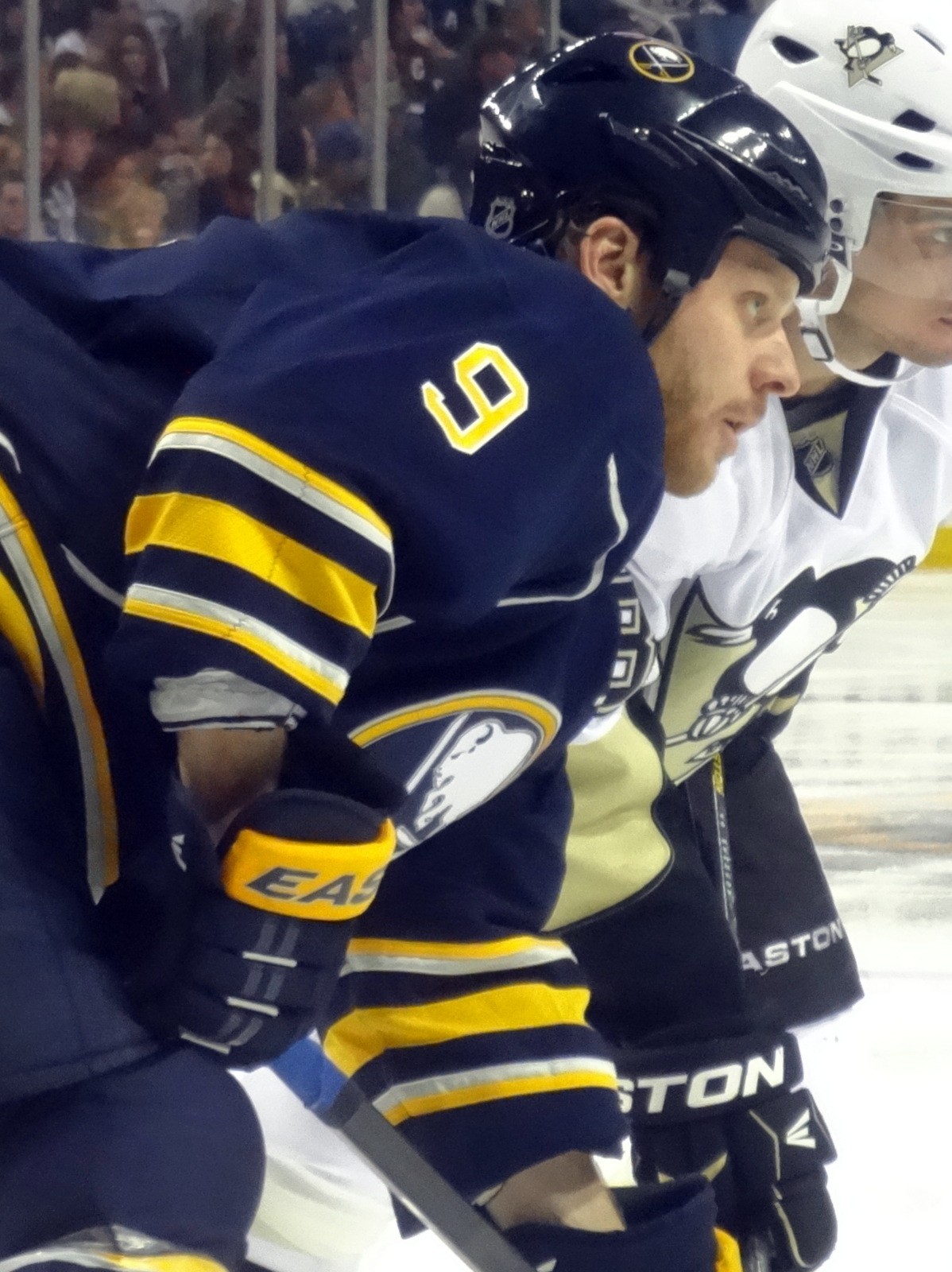
Ott with the Buffalo Sabres in 2013

=== Buffalo Sabres ===
On July 2, 2012, Ott was traded, along with Adam Pardy, to the Buffalo Sabres in exchange for Derek Roy. As a Sabre, he quickly became a fan favorite due to his hard work ethic, playing ability, toughness, and desire to win. He scored his first goal as a Sabre in Buffalo's home opener on January 20, 2013, on a power play goal against the Philadelphia Flyers. He had his first fight as a Sabre on January 25, 2013, at home against Carolina Hurricanes defenseman Tim Gleason. On March 19, 2013, Ott scored an early goal in the first period and the overtime winner against the Montreal Canadiens to record his first multi-goal game with the Sabres. As of April 4, 2013, he was promoted to alternate captain after the Sabres traded captain Jason Pominville to the Minnesota Wild at the 2013 NHL trade deadline, joining Thomas Vanek and Drew Stafford as alternate captains for the Sabres. Ott finished his first season with Buffalo with nine goals, 15 assists, 93 penalty minutes and five fights in 48 games, though the Sabres failed to make the 2013 playoffs.

On October 1, 2013, Ott and Thomas Vanek were both awarded the captaincy of the Sabres. However, later in the month on October 27, Vanek was traded to the New York Islanders, leaving Ott as the team's sole captain.

=== St. Louis Blues ===
Approaching the 2013–14 trade deadline, Ott and fellow impending free agent Ryan Miller were traded by the rebuilding Sabres to the St. Louis Blues in exchange for Jaroslav Halák, Chris Stewart, William Carrier and two future draft picks.

On December 5, 2015, Ott suffered a season-ending injury in a game against the Toronto Maple Leafs. Attempting to deliver a body check to Leafs captain Dion Phaneuf, Ott missed the hit and fell awkwardly into the boards. He was diagnosed with a torn hamstring and missed the remainder of the 2015–16 season. He practiced with the Blues prior to game three of their first-round series against the defending champion Chicago Blackhawks but did not play until their second-round series against the Dallas Stars. He played in nine playoff games, putting up one assist as the Blues lost in the Western Conference Final to the San Jose Sharks.

=== Detroit Red Wings ===
Becoming a free agent in the offseason, Ott signed a one-year contract with the Detroit Red Wings on July 1, 2016.

=== Montreal Canadiens ===
On February 28, 2017, Ott was traded to the Montreal Canadiens in exchange for a sixth-round draft pick in the 2018 NHL entry draft.

== Coaching career ==
=== St. Louis Blues ===
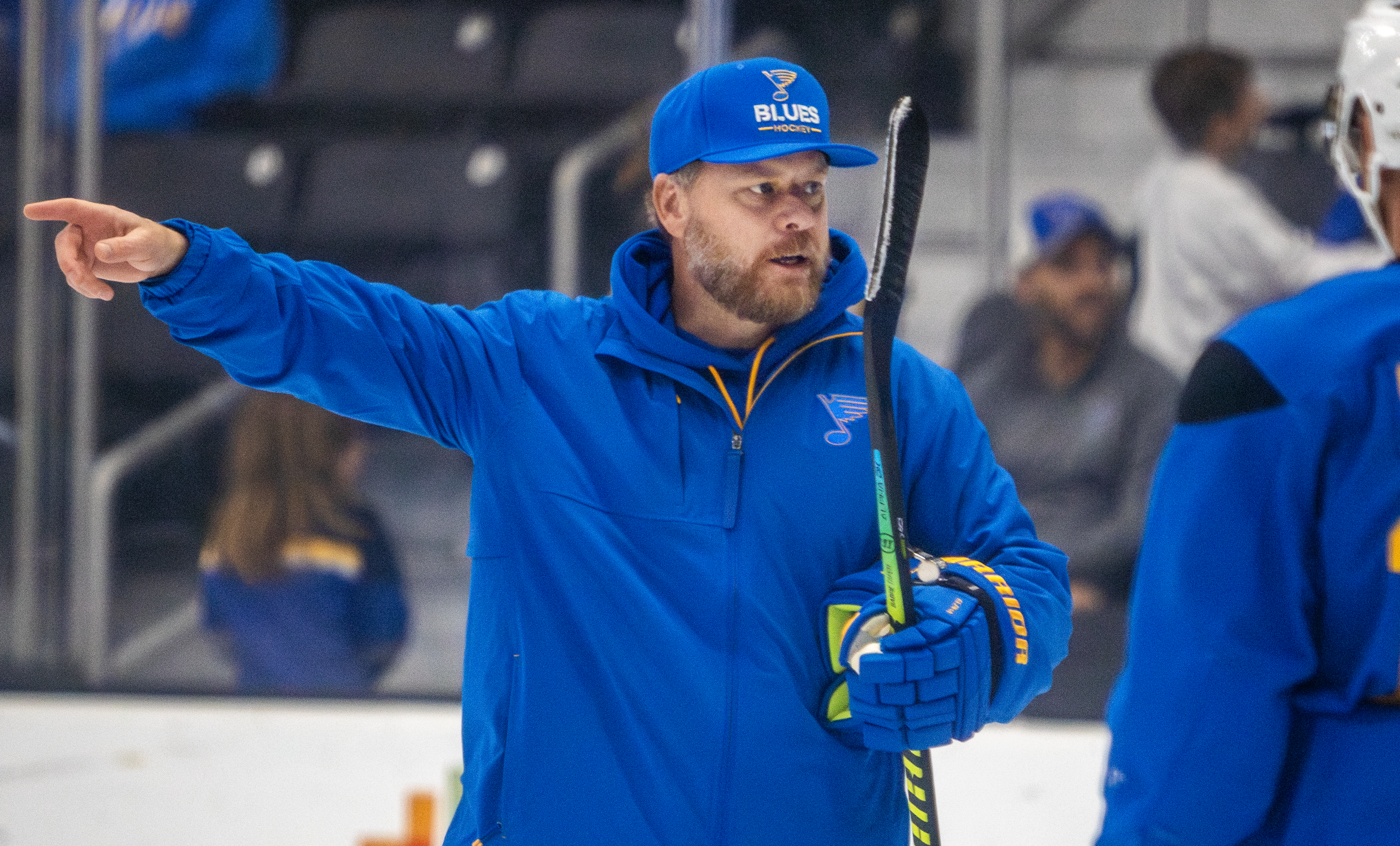
Steve Ott in 2025.

On May 25, 2017, Ott retired from his professional hockey playing career, and was named as an assistant coach for the St. Louis Blues for the 2017–18 season. He finished his career with 848 career games in the NHL.

On June 12, 2019, Ott won the Stanley Cup as the Blues defeated the Boston Bruins in seven games in the 2019.

On January 19, 2026, Ott was named the head coach of the Springfield Thunderbirds following the dismissal of Steve Konowalchuk. On June 10, 2026, Ott signed a two-year extension to remain as Thunderbirds head coach.

== Personal life ==
Ott has been married twice and has three children, one from his first marriage, and two from his current marriage. Before beginning his professional hockey career, Ott raced kneeldown outboard hydroplanes. He gave it up at age 17 to focus on hockey. As of 2014 his father was a professional boat racer in the American Power Boat Association (APBA) and Ott was pit crewing for him during his off-season in the summer. About power boating Ott says "it’s extremely dangerous. A lot of people get injured, and life-threatening stuff as well. It’s something that you have to have in your blood to be able to do it, but I think it’s passed down from my dad."

== Career statistics ==
=== Regular season and playoffs ===
			Regular season					Playoffs
Season	Team	League	GP	G	A	Pts	PIM	GP	G	A	Pts	PIM
1998–99	Leamington Flyers	WOHL	48	14	30	44	110	—	—	—	—	—
1999–2000	Windsor Spitfires	OHL	66	23	39	62	131	12	3	5	8	21
2000–01	Windsor Spitfires	OHL	55	50	37	87	164	9	3	8	11	27
2001–02	Windsor Spitfires	OHL	53	43	45	88	178	14	6	10	16	49
2002–03	Utah Grizzlies	AHL	40	9	11	20	98	—	—	—	—	—
2002–03	Dallas Stars	NHL	26	3	4	7	31	1	0	0	0	0
2003–04	Dallas Stars	NHL	73	2	10	12	152	4	1	0	1	0
2004–05	Hamilton Bulldogs	AHL	67	18	21	39	279	4	0	0	0	20
2005–06	Dallas Stars	NHL	82	5	17	22	178	5	0	1	1	2
2006–07	Dallas Stars	NHL	19	0	4	4	35	6	0	0	0	8
2006–07	Iowa Stars	AHL	3	0	0	0	8	—	—	—	—	—
2007–08	Dallas Stars	NHL	73	11	11	22	147	18	2	1	3	22
2008–09	Dallas Stars	NHL	64	19	27	46	135	—	—	—	—	—
2009–10	Dallas Stars	NHL	73	22	14	36	153	—	—	—	—	—
2010–11	Dallas Stars	NHL	82	12	20	32	183	—	—	—	—	—
2011–12	Dallas Stars	NHL	74	11	28	39	156	—	—	—	—	—
2012–13	Buffalo Sabres	NHL	48	9	15	24	93	—	—	—	—	—
2013–14	Buffalo Sabres	NHL	59	9	11	20	55	—	—	—	—	—
2013–14	St. Louis Blues	NHL	23	0	3	3	37	6	0	2	2	14
2014–15	St. Louis Blues	NHL	78	3	9	12	86	6	0	0	0	26
2015–16	St. Louis Blues	NHL	21	0	2	2	34	9	0	1	1	8
2016–17	Detroit Red Wings	NHL	42	3	3	6	63	—	—	—	—	—
2016–17	Montreal Canadiens	NHL	11	0	1	1	17	6	0	0	0	0
NHL totals			848	109	179	288	1555	61	3	5	8	80

=== International ===
Year	Team	Event	GP	G	A	Pts	PIM
2001	Canada	WJC	7	2	1	3	6
2002	Canada	WJC	7	3	3	6	8
2010	Canada	WC	7	0	1	1	20
Junior totals			14	5	4	9	14

== Awards and honours ==
Award	Year
OHL
Third All-Star Team	2001
CHL Second All-Star Team	2001
Second All-Star Team	2002
NHL
Stanley Cup champion (coaching staff)	2019

Awards and achievements
Preceded by Brenden Morrow	Dallas Stars first-round draft pick 2000	Succeeded by Jason Bacashihua
Preceded by Jason Pominville	Buffalo Sabres captain co-captain with Thomas Vanek until Oct 27, 2013, then lone captain 2013–14	Succeeded by Brian Gionta
