= Radek Faksa =

Czech ice hockey player (born 1994)

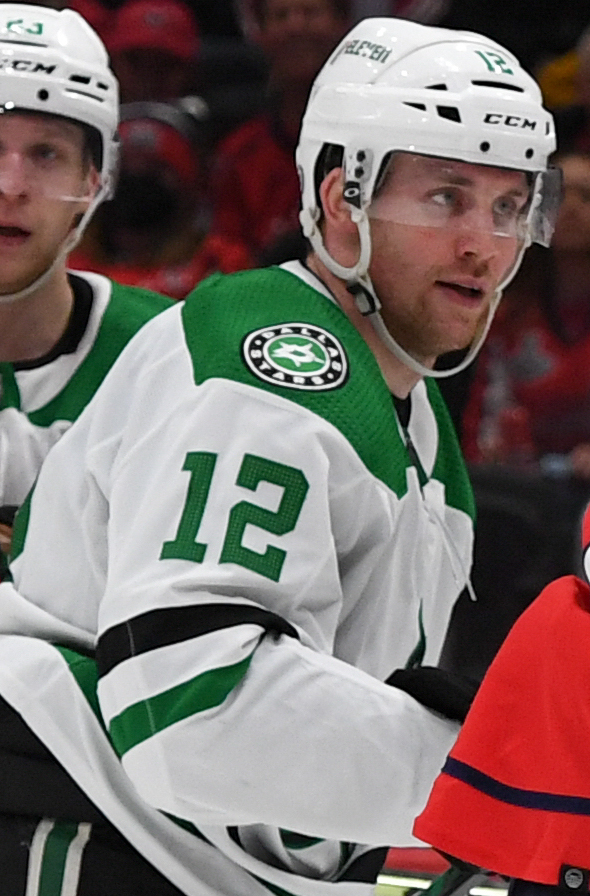
- Faksa with the Dallas Stars in 2022
- Born: 9 January 1994 (age 32) Vítkov, Czech Republic
- Height: 6 ft 3 in (191 cm)
- Weight: 216 lb (98 kg; 15 st 6 lb)
- Position: Centre
- Shoots: Left
- NHL team Former teams: Dallas Stars; St. Louis Blues
- National team: Czech Republic
- NHL draft: 13th overall, 2012; Dallas Stars
- Playing career: 2013–present

Radek Faksa (born 9 January 1994) is a Czech professional ice hockey player who is a centre for the Dallas Stars of the National Hockey League (NHL). In his rookie season in the Ontario Hockey League (OHL), he was the league's leading rookie scorer when he was playing for the Kitchener Rangers. Faksa was drafted 13th overall by the Stars in the 2012 NHL entry draft.

== Early life ==
Faksa was born on 9 January 1994, in Vítkov, Czech Republic, to parents Alena and Jiri Faksa. His mother was a figure skater while his uncle was a professional hockey player in the Czech Republic. Faksa began his ice hockey career in his hometown Opava alongside his older brother Martin. As his mother was a single parent, she struggled to fund his ice hockey career. At the age of 11, Faksa received an offer from HC Oceláři Třinec to play in Třinec's system. He accepted and moved alone to Třinec, where he lived by himself in a hotel room paid for by his team. Faksa struggled in his first season with the team and returned home but was encouraged by his mother and HC Oceláři Třinec's general manager to continue playing.

== Playing career ==
=== Amateur ===
Faksa split the 2009–10 and 2010–11 between HC Oceláři Třinec's under-18 and under-20 clubs. He registered 19 goals and 30 assists with the under-18 team and nine goals and six assists with the under-20 team. Following the 2010–11 season, Faksa was drafted 22nd overall in the 2011 CHL Import Draft by the Kitchener Rangers of the Ontario Hockey League (OHL). Faksa joined the Rangers immediately for their 2011–12 season and scored his first career OHL goal, and added two assists, on 1 October to lift the Rangers over Saginaw Spirit. Faksa continued to tally points over October and November, resulting in him earning a high ranking from the NHL Central Scouting Bureau among all 2012 NHL entry draft eligible OHL players. At the end of November, Faksa was named the OHL's Rookie of the Month after he paced all league rookies with eight goals and eight assists for 16 points over 10 games. He was also named to the Czech Republic men's national junior ice hockey team preliminary World Junior roster. By the mid-point of the season, Faksa and the Rangers had maintained a 22-10-1-0 record and ranked third in the Western Conference. Faksa played an important role in this winning record, as he led all OHL rookies with 16 goals and 17 assists. He earned praise for his easy transition to the North American style of play and drew comparisons to Gabriel Landeskog, a fellow European import player. In recognition of his performance, Faksa was selected to participate in the 2012 CHL Top Prospects Game, where he won the “Showdown Breakaway Challenge” in the Top Prospects Skills Competition. While competing in the OHL, Faksa took courses online to complete his Czech credits and graduate from high school.

Faksa earned his second Rookie of the Month honors in January after leading all rookies in scoring with six goals and eight assists for 14 points over 10 games. On 10 March 2012, Faksa tallied his fifth goal over three games for his 28th on the season which tied the Rangers record for most goals by a rookie selected through the import draft. As the Rangers battled for a playoff position, Faksa picked up at least one point in seven of the Rangers’ final nine regular season games to secure them a spot in the OHL postseason. He finished the month of March with seven goals and seven assists over 13 games, including three points in four playoff games. As such, he received the OHL's Rookie of the Month honor for the third time in the season. Although he suffered a concussion during the Rangers first-round series against the Owen Sound Attack, Faksa returned to the lineup for Game 3 of the second-round. In spite of his concussion, Faksa ranked seventh overall among CHL players eligible for the 2012 NHL entry draft. He finished his rookie season leading all rookies with 29 goals and 37 assists for 66 points. He was named to the OHL's 2011-12 First All-Rookie Team and was nominated for the Emms Family Award as the OHL's Rookie of the Year.

Upon concluding his rookie season, Faksa was drafted 13th overall by the Dallas Stars in the 2012 NHL entry draft. He was the first Czech taken in the first round of an NHL entry draft since Jakub Voráček's selection in 2007. In addition, Faksa was drafted seventh overall by the Kontinental Hockey League (KHL)'s Neftekhimik Nizhnekamsk in the 2012 KHL Junior Draft. Faksa chose to join the Stars organization and signed a three-year entry-level contract with them after participating in their 2012 training camp. Due to the 2012–13 NHL lockout, Faksa was returned to the Rangers for the 2012–13 OHL season, however he was made eligible to return to the Stars for their training camp once the lockout ended. Faksa played the entirety of the 2012–13 season with the Rangers, recording nine goals and 22 assists for 31 points over 39 games. While his regular season was shortened due to a medial collateral ligament (MCL) sprain, Faksa returned to the Rangers lineup for their OHL playoff series where he added four goals and two assists over 10 games. On 16 April 2013, Faksa was reassigned to the Dallas Stars' American Hockey League (AHL) affiliate, the Texas Stars, for the remainder of their season. He recorded his first professional point, an assist, on 19 April to help the Stars clinch first place in the Western Conference for the 2013 Calder Cup playoffs.

Faksa attended the Dallas Stars' training camp ahead of the 2013–14 season but was reassigned back to the Rangers before the season started. Upon being returned to juniors, Faksa tallied a hat-trick to lead the Rangers 5–3 over the Oshawa Generals and improve their record to 2–1–0. By late December, Faksa was leading the team with 14 goals and 11 assists for 25 points. On 10 January 2014, Faksa was traded by Kitchener to the Sudbury Wolves in exchange for fellow Czech Dominik Kubalík and two second-round draft picks. He finished the season with a combined 21 goals and 27 assists through 59 games with the Rangers and Wolves. He also added one goal and two assists for three points over five postseason games with Sudbury. On 2 April, Faksa was reassigned to the AHL for the remainder of the 2013–14 season. He scored his first professional goal on 12 April against the San Antonio Rampage to help lead the Stars to their 11th consecutive win.

=== Professional ===
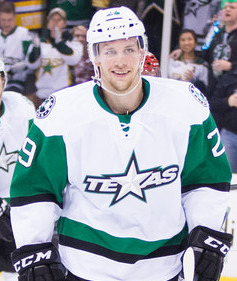
Faksa with the Texas Stars during the 2015–16 season.

Faksa participated in the Stars' 2014 training camp ahead of the 2014–15 season but was reassigned to their AHL affiliate before the start of the season. He accumulated four goals and 10 points in 32 games for Texas before sustaining the season-ending shoulder injury in mid-January. He recovered for training camp the following season and gained 15 pounds of muscle. After participating in the Stars' training camp, Faksa was returned to the AHL for the 2015–16 season. He played one game with the Texas Stars, tallying two goals, before being recalled to the NHL level on 16 October. Faksa made his NHL debut the following night against the Florida Panthers, while skating on a line with Antoine Roussel and Colton Sceviour. He later scored his first career NHL goal on 6 November 2015, in a 4–1 win over the Carolina Hurricanes. Faksa remained with the Stars until 10 January when he was returned to the AHL after playing in 18 games. Faksa played in 27 games for the Texas Stars, and accumulated 16 goals and 22 assists, before being recalled in February as a replacement for Jason Spezza. Faksa remained at the NHL level for the remainder of the regular season, where he became a mainstay on the Stars' third line between Aleš Hemský and Antoine Roussel. He was credited as being one of the main reasons why the Stars were in a playoff position despite significant injuries to several forwards. Faksa finished the regular season with five goals and seven assists for 12 points through 45 games.

Faksa made his NHL postseason debut in Game 1 of the 2016 Stanley Cup playoffs against the Minnesota Wild. He scored his first playoff goal in his debut and recorded three hits and one block in the Stars' 4–0 win over the Wild. After the Stars eliminated the Wild, they met with the St. Louis Blues in the Western Conference second round. While continuing to play on the Stars' third line, Faksa scored the game-winning goal of Game 1 to lift the Stars 2–1 over the Blues. He recorded his third goal of the postseason in Game 4 and finished the playoffs with three goals and two assists. At the time, his three goals were the second-most scored by a Dallas Stars rookie in the postseason since 1994.

Following the Stars' elimination, Faksa was chosen to represent the Czech Republic in the 2016 World Cup of Hockey. Although he suffered a concussion during the tournament, he returned to the Stars' training and development camp ahead of the 2016–17 season. After impressing the Stars training staff during camp, Faksa was chosen to remain with the team to start the season. He started the season playing as the Stars' fourth line centre, where he impressed coaching staff and began earning more ice time. He retained Roussel as his linemate but the two gained Brett Ritchie as their right winger instead of Aleš Hemský. As the season continued, Faksa was regarded as one of the Stars' best checking line centers. While he struggled to record points, Faksa was praised by Stars coach Lindy Ruff for being a "big man who can play physical" and having a steady presence while on the ice. He finished the regular season with a career-high 12 goals and 21 assists for 33 points through 80 games and ranked fourth on the team with 101 hits. As a result of his improved play, Faksa was signed to a three-year contract extension worth $6.6 million.

In the first year of his new contract, Faksa set a new career-high with 17 goals but recorded fewer assists and tied his previous career-high of 33 total points. As with the previous season, Faksa and Roussel returned as linemates but replaced Ritchie with Tyler Pitlick. On 28 November 2017, Faksa tallied a natural hat trick in the second period, scoring the only goals in the Stars' shutout of the Vegas Golden Knights. It was the first hat trick of his NHL career, the first scored in T-Mobile Arena, and the first time the Golden Knights were shut out in their inaugural season. Faksa registered two more goals over the next two games and was named the NHL's Third Star of the Week ending on 3 December. Faksa continued to find success on the Stars' third-line with Roussel and Pitlick as he tallied 10 goals and 10 assists over his first 40 games of the season. Faksa credited his success on the third-line to feeling more confident in his role than in previous seasons. At the end of the season, he set a new career-high with 17 goals and 16 assists for 33 points. He was also credited as being the Stars' best defensive forward after posting a team-best plus-21.

Faksa returned to the Stars for the 2018–19 season, his third full season with the team. He began the season playing alongside Valeri Nichushkin and Tyler Pitlick on the Stars' shutdown line against opposing teams' best players. Faksa and the Stars began the season with a 16–11–3 record over 30 games, including a four-game winning streak in December. In mid-December, Faksa was moved from his typical position of centre to wing alongside fellow Czech Martin Hanzal and Tyler Pitlick. Faksa had accumulated five goals and five assists for 10 points at the time while also averaging 16:02 of ice time. This experiment on the left wing lasted a few games before Faksa was returned to his usual centre position and reunited with Comeau. In their first game back together, the trio of Comeau–Faksa–Pitlick combined for two goals and three assists. However, they only remained together for a month before Pitlick suffered an injury in February and was replaced by Jamie Benn. Faksa missed one game in March as a precaution after suffering a neck injury during a game against the New York Rangers. As the Stars pushed to qualify for the 2019 Stanley Cup playoffs, Faksa was praised by head coach Jim Montgomery for being one of the most consistent players on the team in terms of defensive play and scoring. On 2 April, the Stars clinched a postseason berth for the first time since 2016 after beating the Philadelphia Flyers 6–2. Faksa and the Stars advanced to the Western Conference second round before being eliminated by the St. Louis Blues in double overtime in Game 7. Following their elimination, Faksa was named to Team Czech Republic for the 2019 IIHF World Championship. During the tournament, Faksa centred the Czech's second line between Jakub Vrana and Dmitrij Jaskin. He finished the tournament with four points as Czech Republic fell to Russia in the bronze medal round in a shootout loss.

Due to various injuries to the Stars lineup, Faksa opened the 2019–20 season on the Stars first line between Jamie Benn and Tyler Seguin. When speaking of this decision, head coach Jim Montgomery said, "We liked how Faksa's had a good camp, just wanted to give him the opportunity to play with those two, and drive play a little bit." However, this change was short-lived and Faksa was reunited with his third-line teammates Andrew Cogliano and Joel L'Esperance within a few games. Once Comeau returned to the Stars lineup following an injury, he was reunited with Faksa and Cogliano on the Stars' third line. Although Faksa missed a few games with an upper-body injury the Stars began January by winning seven of their first eight games. Through his first 37 games of the season, Faksa scored 5 goals and 8 assists for 13 points and ranked second among all Stars’ skaters with 21 takeaways. Once the Stars were eliminated from the 2020 Stanley Cup playoffs, it was revealed that Faksa had been playing with a broken wrist. On 11 October, the Stars re-signed Faksa to a five-year, $16.25 million contract extension. Due to the COVID-19 pandemic, the 2020–21 season was delayed until 13 January 2021 and limited to only 56 games. However, Faksa continued to struggle with his wrist throughout the season and finished with 14 points in 55 games, including just two points on the power play.

==== St. Louis Blues ====
On 2 July 2024, Faksa's nine-season tenure with the Stars ended when he was traded to the St. Louis Blues in exchange for future considerations.

==== Return to Dallas ====
Following one season in St. Louis, Faksa returned to the Stars, signing as a free agent to a three-year, $6 million contract on 1 July 2025.

== International play ==
Faksa competed as part of the Czech Republic junior team at the 2011 World U18 Championships, the 2012 World Junior Championships, the 2013 World Junior Championships, and for the Czech Republic senior team in the 2016 World Championship.

== Personal life ==
Faksa and his wife have two children.

== Career statistics ==
=== Regular season and playoffs ===
			Regular season					Playoffs
Season	Team	League	GP	G	A	Pts	PIM	GP	G	A	Pts	PIM
2009–10	HC Oceláři Třinec	CZE U18	36	19	19	38	52	—	—	—	—	—
2009–10	HC Oceláři Třinec	CZE U20	3	0	0	0	2	—	—	—	—	—
2010–11	HC Oceláři Třinec	CZE U18	28	19	30	49	32	2	1	0	1	10
2010–11	HC Oceláři Třinec	CZE U20	24	9	6	15	12	2	2	2	4	4
2011–12	Kitchener Rangers	OHL	62	29	37	66	47	13	2	4	6	10
2012–13	Kitchener Rangers	OHL	39	9	22	31	26	10	4	2	6	4
2012–13	Texas Stars	AHL	2	0	1	1	0	—	—	—	—	—
2013–14	Kitchener Rangers	OHL	30	16	11	27	22	—	—	—	—	—
2013–14	Sudbury Wolves	OHL	29	5	16	21	26	5	1	2	3	10
2013–14	Texas Stars	AHL	6	1	2	3	6	21	4	0	4	8
2014–15	Texas Stars	AHL	32	4	6	10	12	—	—	—	—	—
2015–16	Texas Stars	AHL	28	15	11	26	22	—	—	—	—	—
2015–16	Dallas Stars	NHL	45	5	7	12	16	13	3	2	5	2
2016–17	Dallas Stars	NHL	80	12	21	33	67	—	—	—	—	—
2017–18	Dallas Stars	NHL	79	17	16	33	36	—	—	—	—	—
2018–19	Dallas Stars	NHL	81	15	15	30	54	13	0	1	1	6
2019–20	Dallas Stars	NHL	66	11	9	20	42	19	3	5	8	4
2020–21	Dallas Stars	NHL	55	6	8	14	30	—	—	—	—	—
2021–22	Dallas Stars	NHL	77	5	14	19	52	7	1	1	2	4
2022–23	Dallas Stars	NHL	81	11	9	20	39	19	1	2	3	10
2023–24	Dallas Stars	NHL	74	7	12	19	20	8	1	0	1	2
2024–25	St. Louis Blues	NHL	70	5	10	15	30	7	1	4	5	2
2025–26	Dallas Stars	NHL	58	2	15	17	18	6	0	0	0	4
NHL totals			766	96	136	232	404	92	10	15	25	34

=== International ===
Year	Team	Event	Result	GP	G	A	Pts	PIM
2011	Czech Republic	U18	8th	6	0	0	0	2
2012	Czech Republic	WJC	5th	6	2	0	2	4
2013	Czech Republic	WJC	5th	6	0	2	2	2
2014	Czech Republic	WJC	6th	5	1	0	1	2
2016	Czech Republic	WC	5th	3	0	0	0	0
2016	Czech Republic	WCH	6th	1	0	0	0	0
2018	Czech Republic	WC	7th	8	0	3	3	4
2019	Czech Republic	WC	4th	7	1	3	4	2
2026	Czechia	OG	8th	3	0	2	2	0
Junior totals				23	3	2	5	10
Senior totals				22	1	8	9	6

== Awards and honours ==
Awards	Year	Ref
AHL
Calder Cup champion	2014	

Awards and achievements
Preceded by Jamie Oleksiak	Dallas Stars first-round draft pick 2012	Succeeded by Valeri Nichushkin
