= Jason Bacashihua =

American ice hockey player (born 1982)

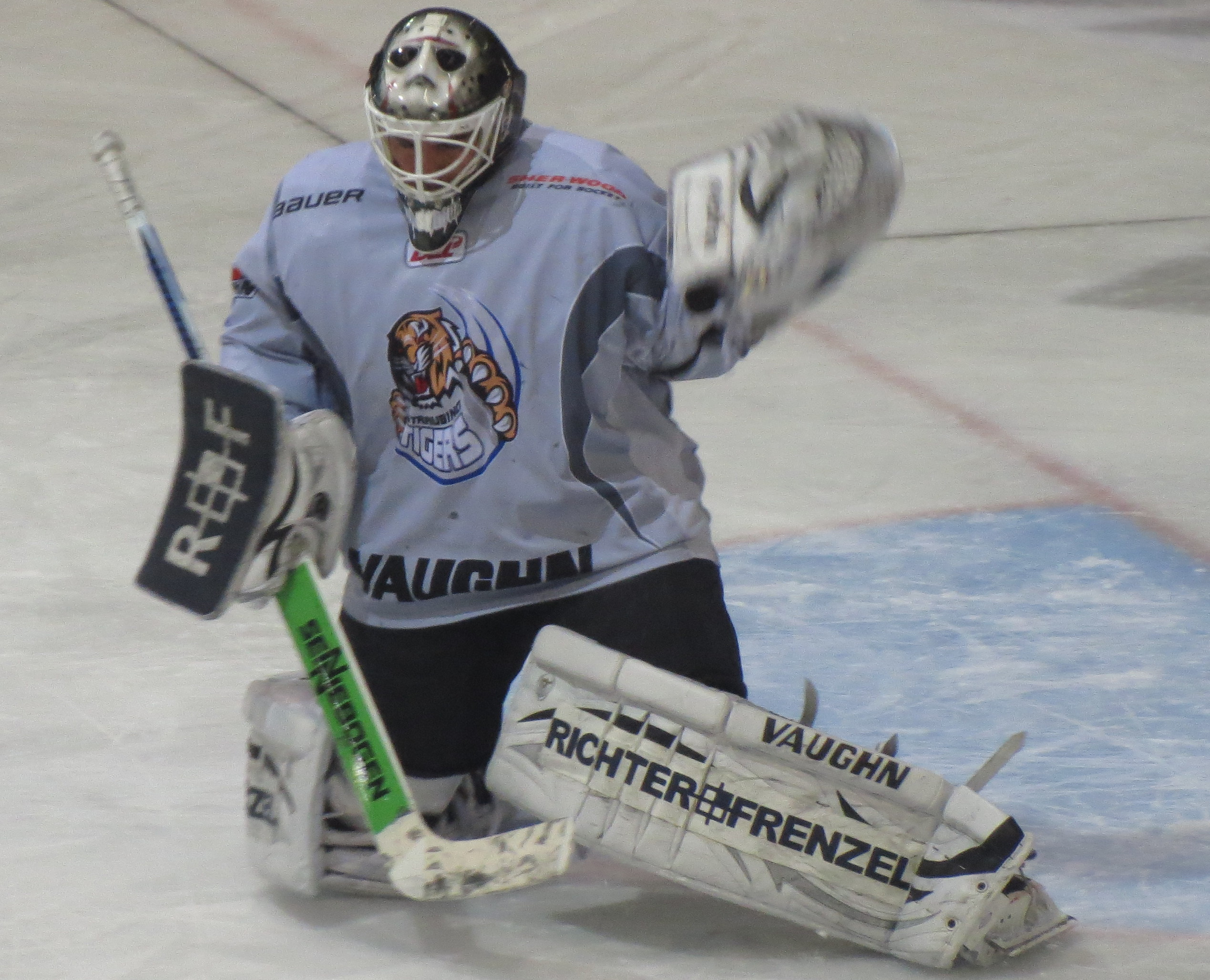
- Bacashihua in 2013
- Born: September 20, 1982 (age 43) Dearborn Heights, Michigan, U.S.
- Height: 5 ft 11 in (180 cm)
- Weight: 177 lb (80 kg; 12 st 9 lb)
- Position: Goaltender
- Caught: Left
- Played for: St. Louis Blues; Straubing Tigers; HC 05 Banská Bystrica; High1; KS Cracovia; WSV Sterzing Broncos; Dunaújvárosi Acélbikák; Manchester Storm
- National team: United States
- NHL draft: 26th overall, 2001; Dallas Stars
- Playing career: 2002–2022

Jason Bacashihua (born September 20, 1982) is an American former ice hockey goaltender. He played 38 games in the National Hockey League with the St. Louis Blues during the 2005–06 and 2006–07 seasons. The rest of his career, which lasted from 2002 to 2022, was spent in the minor leagues and then in various leagues through Europe and Asia. Internationally Bacashihua played for the American national team at the 2006 and 2007 World Championship.

== Playing career ==
Bacashihua was selected in the first round of the 2001 NHL entry draft by the Dallas Stars, 26th overall. He spent two seasons with the Stars' AHL affiliate Utah Grizzlies before he was traded on June 25, 2004, to the St. Louis Blues for Shawn Belle.

Jason played for the Blues AHL affiliates, the Worcester IceCats and the Peoria Rivermen, before being called up to the main Blues roster and making his NHL debut in the 2005–06 season. After failing to make the team out of training camp, Bacashihua was assigned to Peoria prior to the 2007–08 season.

On November 8, 2007, Bacashihua was traded by the Blues to the Colorado Avalanche for future considerations, and was assigned to the Avalanche's affiliate, the Lake Erie Monsters. The Monsters are the same Grizzlies franchise, renamed and relocated, with whom Bacashihua started his AHL career. Bacashihua spent the next season and a half with the Monsters rotating the starting position with Tyler Weiman. During the 2008–09 season between February and March, Bacashihua won a franchise-best eight straight games. He was selected as the AHL Player of the Week (February 23 – March 1), to mark the first time in franchise history a Monsters player had received the award.

On July 31, 2009, Bacashihua signed a one-year contract with the Hershey Bears of the AHL for the 2009–10 season. He appeared in pre-season games for the Washington Capitals before being reassigned to Hershey. In 22 regular season games he won an impressive 17 however he was demoted to third choice goalie behind Capitals prospects and failed to make a playoff appearance for the Calder Cup winning Bears.

On July 2, 2010, Bacashihua returned to the Colorado Avalanche organization, signing a one-year contract as a free agent for the 2010–11 season. Assigned to reacquaint with the Lake Erie Monsters, Bacashihua split the season with former NHL goaltender John Grahame to form one of the best performing tandems in the AHL. He was recalled by the Avalanche on one occasion to serve as backup in place of the injured Craig Anderson, however failed to make his Avalanche debut. Returning to the Monsters to set a career professional best in goals against average, Bacashihua appeared in 42 games for 23 wins to help guide the Monsters to their first post-season berth.

On July 19, 2011, Bacashihua signed a one-year contract with the Philadelphia Flyers. Used primarily as a veteran backup within the Flyers organization, he spent the majority of the year with AHL affiliate, the Adirondack Phantoms. He was recalled twice to Philadelphia to dress and serve as a backup, however again was unable to mark a return to the NHL since 2007.

On July 22, 2012, Bacashihua was signed to his first professional European contract on a one-year deal to become a number one starter with German club, Straubing Tigers of the DEL. In making his DEL debut during the 2012–13 season, Bacashihua responded with the strong start with the Tigers to earn a one-year extension on December 28, 2012. He appeared in every game with the Tigers as their starting goalie to help gain a playoff position through qualification before losing in the first round.

In the two following seasons with the Tigers, Bacashihua was unable to prevent the club from missing the playoffs. With a decline statistically in his third season, Bacashihua was not offered a new contract at season's end with Straubing on March 3, 2015.

After not receiving a new contract, he moved to the Slovak Extraliga, where he played two seasons with HC 05 Banská Bystrica, leading the league in his second season with a 2.05 goals against average and helping Bystrica claim the Championship. For the 2017–18 season, he moved to South Korea and played with High1 in Asia League Ice Hockey.

At the start of the 2018–19 season, he continued his journeyman career in moving to Poland to play for Cracovia on September 28, 2018.

After spells with WSV Sterzing Broncos and Dunaújvárosi Acélbikák, Bacashihua signed for UK EIHL side Manchester Storm in November 2021, following an injury to the Storm's starting goaltender Matt Ginn.

== Career statistics ==
=== Regular season and playoffs ===
			Regular season										Playoffs
Season	Team	League	GP	W	L	T	OTL	MIN	GA	SO	GAA	SV%	GP	W	L	MIN	GA	SO	GAA	SV%
1999–00	Chicago Freeze	NAHL	41	20	19	2	—	2432	118	2	2.91	—	2	0	2	103	12	0	6.97	—
2000–01	Chicago Freeze	NAHL	39	24	14	0	—	2246	121	1	3.23	—	3	1	2	190	12	0	3.79	—
2001–02	Plymouth Whalers	OHL	46	26	12	7	—	2688	105	5	2.34	.921	6	2	4	360	15	0	2.50	.901
2001–02	Utah Grizzlies	AHL	1	0	1	0	—	61	3	0	2.95	.930	—	—	—	—	—	—	—	—
2002–03	Utah Grizzlies	AHL	39	18	18	2	—	2245	118	3	3.15	.907	1	0	1	59	2	0	2.03	.941
2003–04	Utah Grizzlies	AHL	39	13	19	5	—	2234	99	3	2.66	.916	—	—	—	—	—	—	—	—
2004–05	Worcester IceCats	AHL	35	18	13	1	—	1909	80	2	2.51	.902	—	—	—	—	—	—	—	—
2005–06	St. Louis Blues	NHL	19	4	10	—	1	966	52	0	3.23	.899	—	—	—	—	—	—	—	—
2005–06	Peoria Rivermen	AHL	15	9	4	—	0	820	36	2	2.63	.903	—	—	—	—	—	—	—	—
2006–07	St. Louis Blues	NHL	19	3	7	—	3	894	47	0	3.15	.896	—	—	—	—	—	—	—	—
2006–07	Peoria Rivermen	AHL	20	5	10	—	4	1139	55	1	2.90	.885	—	—	—	—	—	—	—	—
2007–08	Peoria Rivermen	AHL	4	1	3	—	0	208	11	0	3.17	.869	—	—	—	—	—	—	—	—
2007–08	Johnstown Chiefs	ECHL	1	1	0	—	0	65	4	0	3.70	.886	—	—	—	—	—	—	—	—
2007–08	Lake Erie Monsters	AHL	19	5	11	—	2	1074	60	1	3.35	.905	—	—	—	—	—	—	—	—
2008–09	Lake Erie Monsters	AHL	39	13	21	—	3	2255	104	2	2.77	.905	—	—	—	—	—	—	—	—
2009–10	Hershey Bears	AHL	22	17	—	3	1	1258	52	1	2.48	.911	—	—	—	—	—	—	—	—
2010–11	Lake Erie Monsters	AHL	42	23	16	—	3	2466	94	4	2.29	.917	2	1	1	118	5	0	2.54	.909
2011–12	Adirondack Phantoms	AHL	23	8	11	—	1	1244	62	0	2.99	.901	—	—	—	—	—	—	—	—
2012–13	Straubing Tigers	DEL	52	25	27	—	0	3123	137	3	2.63	.915	7	3	4	422	22	0	3.13	.910
2013–14	Straubing Tigers	DEL	50	20	28	—	0	2959	130	3	2.64	.919	—	—	—	—	—	—	—	—
2014–15	Straubing Tigers	DEL	35	9	22	—	0	1916	100	0	3.13	.898	—	—	—	—	—	—	—	—
2015–16	HC 05 Banská Bystrica	SVK	40	22	11	—	3	2387	83	5	2.09	.926	17	10	7	1056	31	3	1.76	.939
2016–17	HC 05 Banská Bystrica	SVK	36	23	9	—	4	2167	74	0	2.05	.929	13	10	3	—	—	1	1.92	.934
2017–18	High1	AL	25	—	—	—	—	—	—	—	2.81	.913	—	—	—	—	—	—	—	—
2018–19	KS Cracovia	PHL	5	3	2	—	0	305	12	0	2.36	.906	—	—	—	—	—	—	—	—
2018–19	Deggendorf SC	DEL2	26	11	12	—	0	1466	93	1	3.81	.908	—	—	—	—	—	—	—	—
2019–20	WSV Sterzing Broncos	ALP	39	22	16	—	0	2190	118	0	3.23	.904	—	—	—	—	—	—	—	—
2020–21	Dunaújvárosi Acélbikák	HUN	14	5	9	—	0	—	—	—	4.66	.909	—	—	—	—	—	—	—	—
2021–22	Manchester Storm	EIHL	36	13	23	—	0	—	—	0	3.37	.886	—	—	—	—	—	—	—	—
NHL totals			38	7	17	—	4	1860	99	0	3.19	.897	—	—	—	—	—	—	—	—

=== International ===
Year	Team	Event	GP	W	L	T	MIN	GA	SO	GAA	SV%
2002	United States	WJC	7	4	1	2	420	20	0	2.86	.891
2006	United States	WC	3	1	1	0	140	5	0	2.14	.927
2007	United States	WC	1	0	0	0	20	1	0	3.00	.889
Junior totals			7	4	1	2	420	20	0	2.86	.891
Senior totals			4	1	1	0	160	6	0	2.25	—

== Awards and honours ==
Award	Year
OHL
First All-Rookie Team	2002
F.W. "Dinty" Moore Trophy	2002
Dave Pinkney Trophy	2002
CHL All-Rookie Team	2002

Awards and achievements
Preceded by Steve Ott	Dallas Stars first-round draft pick 2001	Succeeded by Martin Vagner
