= Jamie Oleksiak =

Canadian ice hockey player (born 1992)

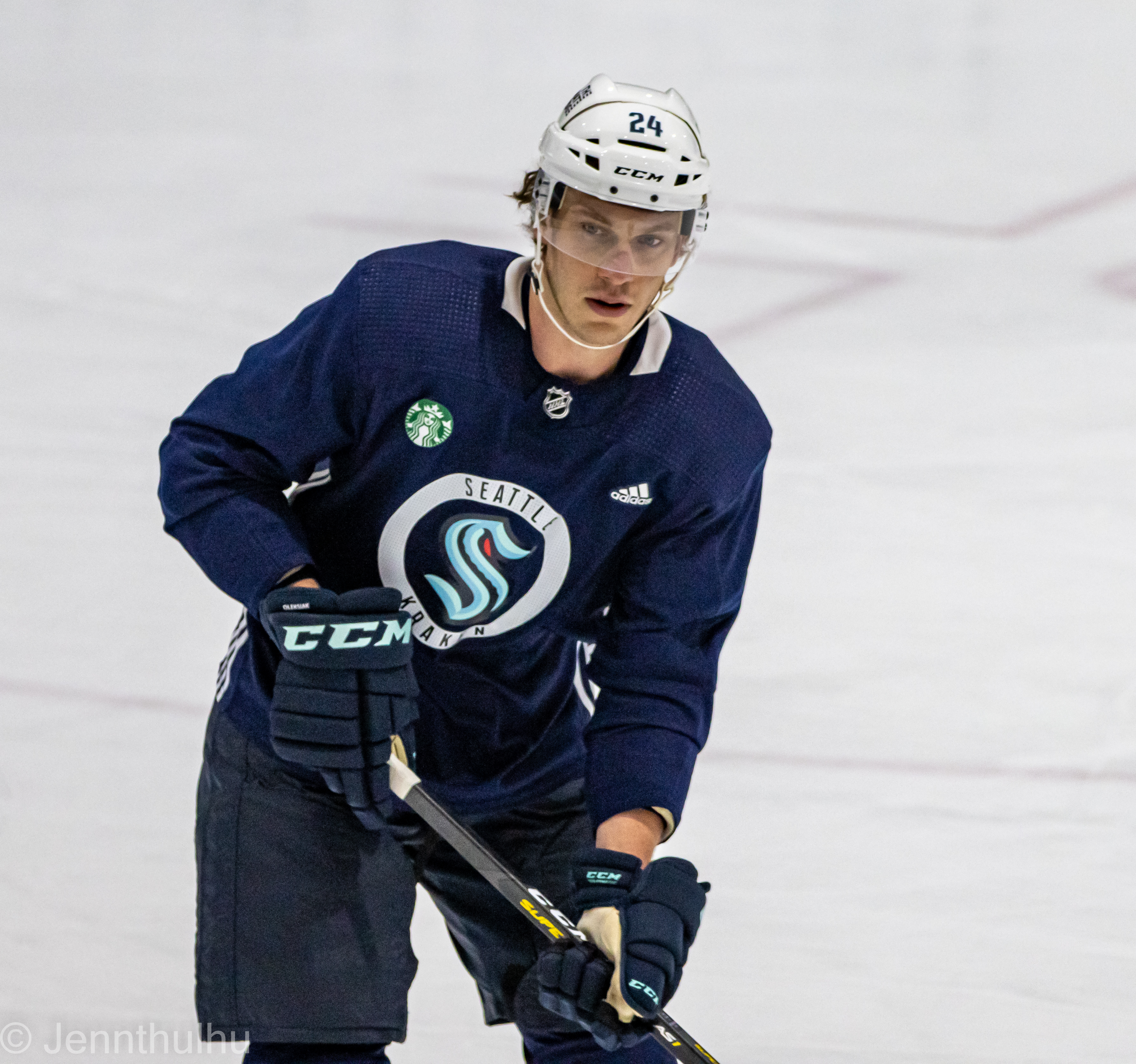
- Oleksiak with the Seattle Kraken in 2022
- Born: December 21, 1992 (age 33) Toronto, Ontario, Canada
- Height: 6 ft 7 in (201 cm)
- Weight: 255 lb (116 kg; 18 st 3 lb)
- Position: Defense
- Shoots: Left
- NHL team Former teams: Vancouver Canucks; Dallas Stars; Pittsburgh Penguins; Seattle Kraken
- National team: Canada
- NHL draft: 14th overall, 2011; Dallas Stars
- Playing career: 2012–present

Jamieson Oleksiak (born December 21, 1992) is a Canadian professional ice hockey player who is a defenceman for the Vancouver Canucks of the National Hockey League (NHL). Nicknamed the "Big Rig", Oleksiak was selected 14th overall in the first round of the 2011 NHL entry draft by the Dallas Stars, the highest draft choice in Northeastern University's history.

== Playing career ==
=== Junior ===
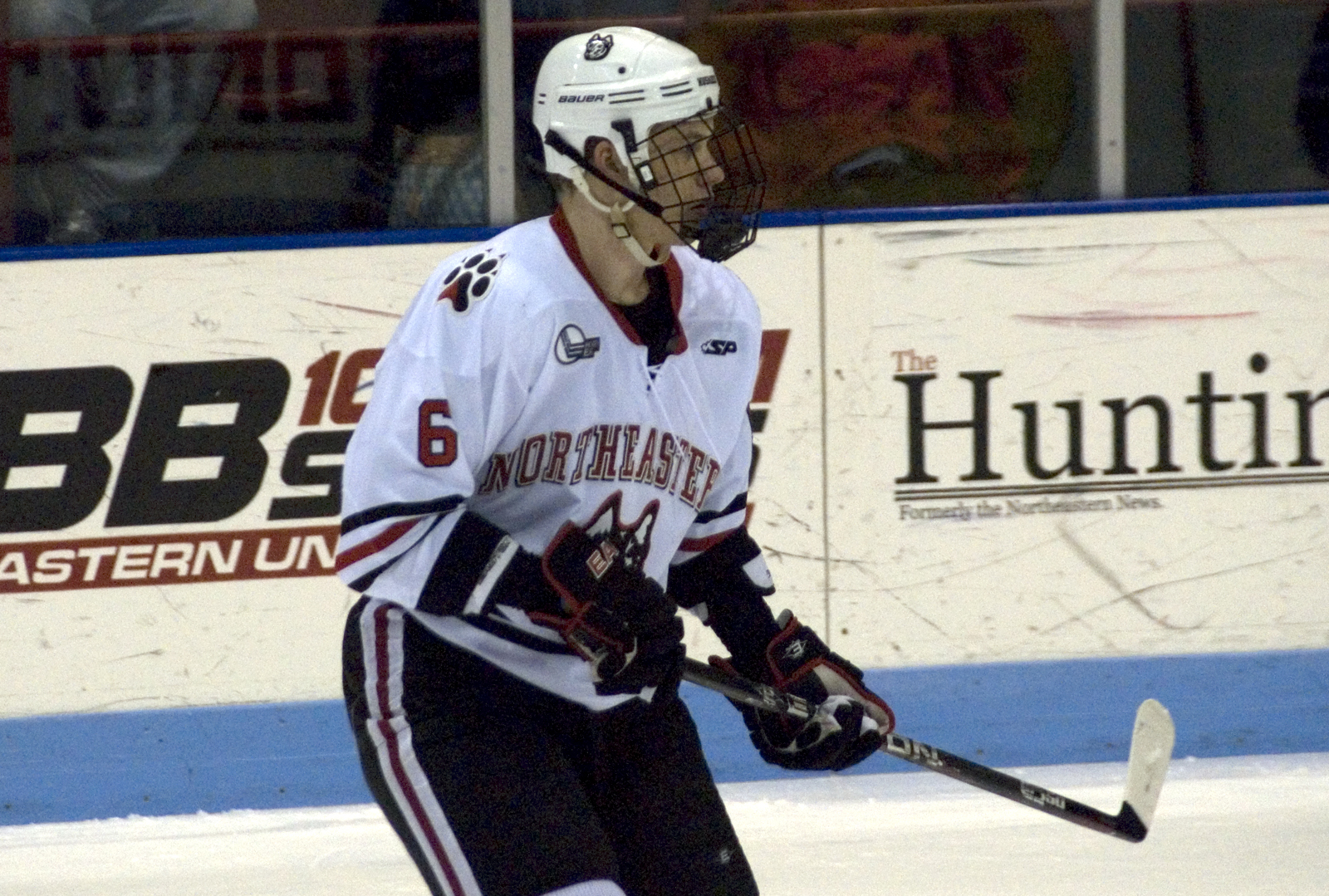
Oleksiak playing for the Northeastern Huskies in January 2011

Oleksiak attended Northeastern University for one year and had 13 points on 4 goals and 9 assists and team-best +13 plus/minus. After his freshman season with the Northeastern Huskies, Oleksiak decided to return to the Canadian Hockey League for further development, and on July 25, 2011, the Saginaw Spirit announced that they had signed Oleksiak to an Ontario Hockey League contract, and on October 6, 2011, it was announced that Oleksiak had signed a three-year entry-level contract with the National Hockey League's Dallas Stars. With the Spirit out of contention during the 2011–12 season, Oleksiak was traded to the title-contending Niagara IceDogs on January 10, 2012.

=== Professional ===
==== First stint with Dallas ====
Following the 2011–12 season, Oleksiak turned professional and was assigned to the Stars' American Hockey League affiliate, the Texas Stars, to begin the 2012–13 season. He tallied his first professional point on October 14 in a win over the Charlotte Checkers. He later scored his first professional goal, the game-winner, on October 24. Through the first 13 games of the 2012–13 season, Oleksiak tallied one goal and four assists to tie for the team lead in scoring among defensemen. He continued to produce as the season continued and quickly accumulated two goals and 10 assists through the next 25 games. As a result of his outstanding play, Oleksiak earned his first NHL callup on January 15, 2013. The callup was short-lived however as he was shortly thereafter reassigned to the AHL. Upon returning to the AHL, Oleksiak continued to shine offensively and was named to the 2012 AHL All-Star Game in Providence, Rhode Island. At the time of the selection, he led the Stars and ranked third amongst all rookies in assists with 20. He was also recognized as the AHL's Rookie for the Month of January.

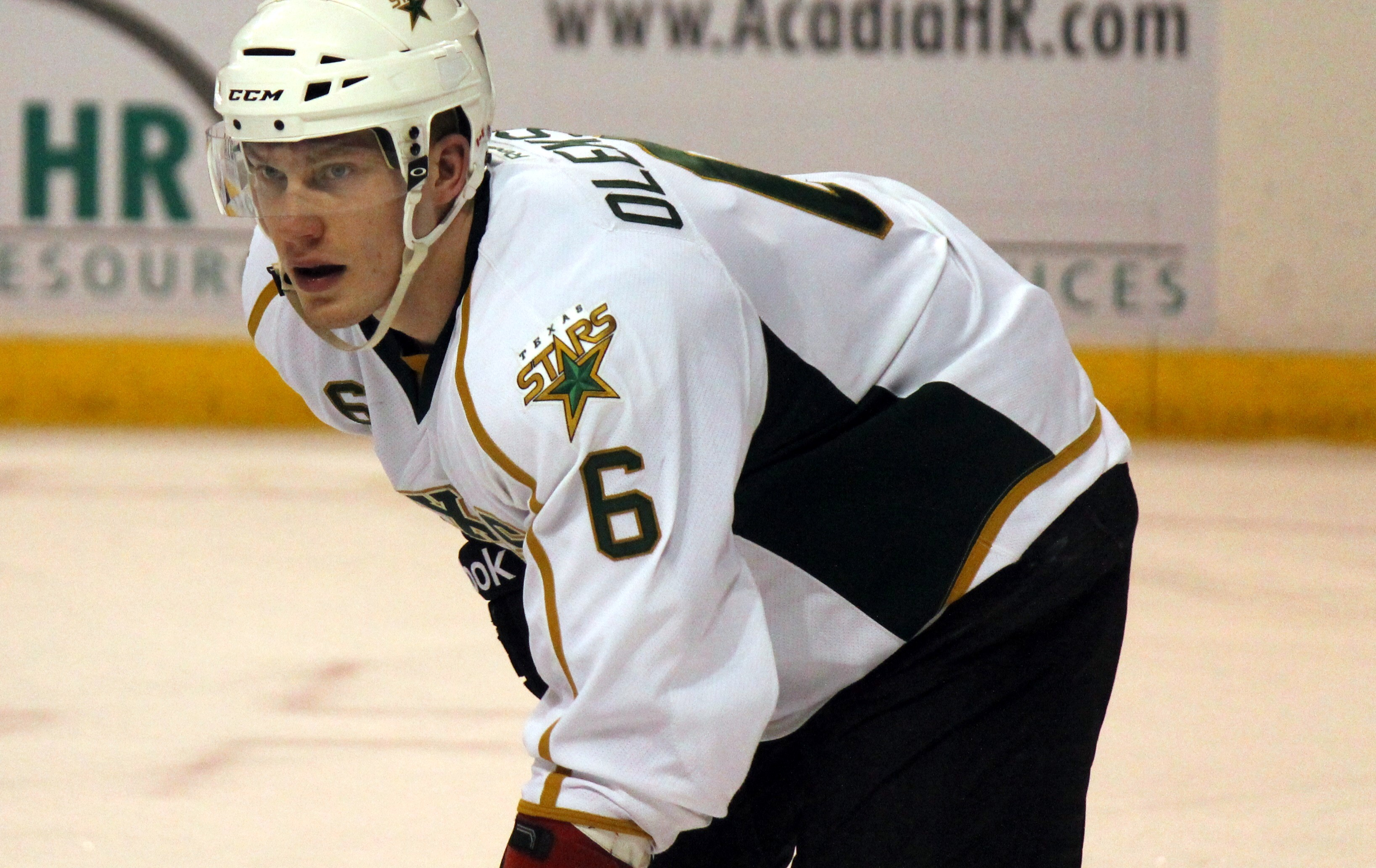
Oleksiak with the Texas Stars in February 2013.

Shortly after these selections, Oleksiak was recalled to the NHL level on January 31, 2013. He subsequently made his NHL debut on February 1 in a 4–3 win over the Phoenix Coyotes. Upon making his NHL debut listed at 6-foot-7, Oleksiak became the tallest player in Dallas Stars history to play for the team. Over the next five games, he averaged nearly 16 minutes of ice time but remained pointless. He eventually tallied his first NHL assist on February 13 in a game against the Calgary Flames but was reassigned to the AHL the following day. Oleksiak played five games for the Texas Stars before being recalled to the NHL level again on February 24. Despite playing just five games since February 1, he still ranked first among team defensemen in scoring and plus/minus (+20). Oleksiak played a total of 16 games for the Dallas Stars during the 2012–13 season, accumulating two assists, 14 penalty minutes and 11 shots. He struggled near the end of his time with the Dallas Stars and had two assists and a minus-5 rating. Oleksiak finished his first AHL season with six goals and 27 assists for 33 points through 59 games. He also participated in the 2013 Calder Cup playoffs where he tallied one assist through nine games. During the 2013 offseason, Oleksiak changed his Dallas Stars jersey number from 43 to 5.

Oleksiak participated in four preseason games with the Dallas Stars before being returned to the AHL for the 2013–14 season. He began the season strong, leading all Texas defensemen with three goals through the first 22 games of the season. Following an injury to defenseman Stephane Robidas, Oleksiak earned his first NHL recall of the season on November 30. He played in seven games for the Stars, collecting five shots and two penalty minutes, before being reassigned to the AHL on December 18. Upon returning to the AHL, Oleksiak helped the Texas Stars win the 2014 Calder Cup playoffs.

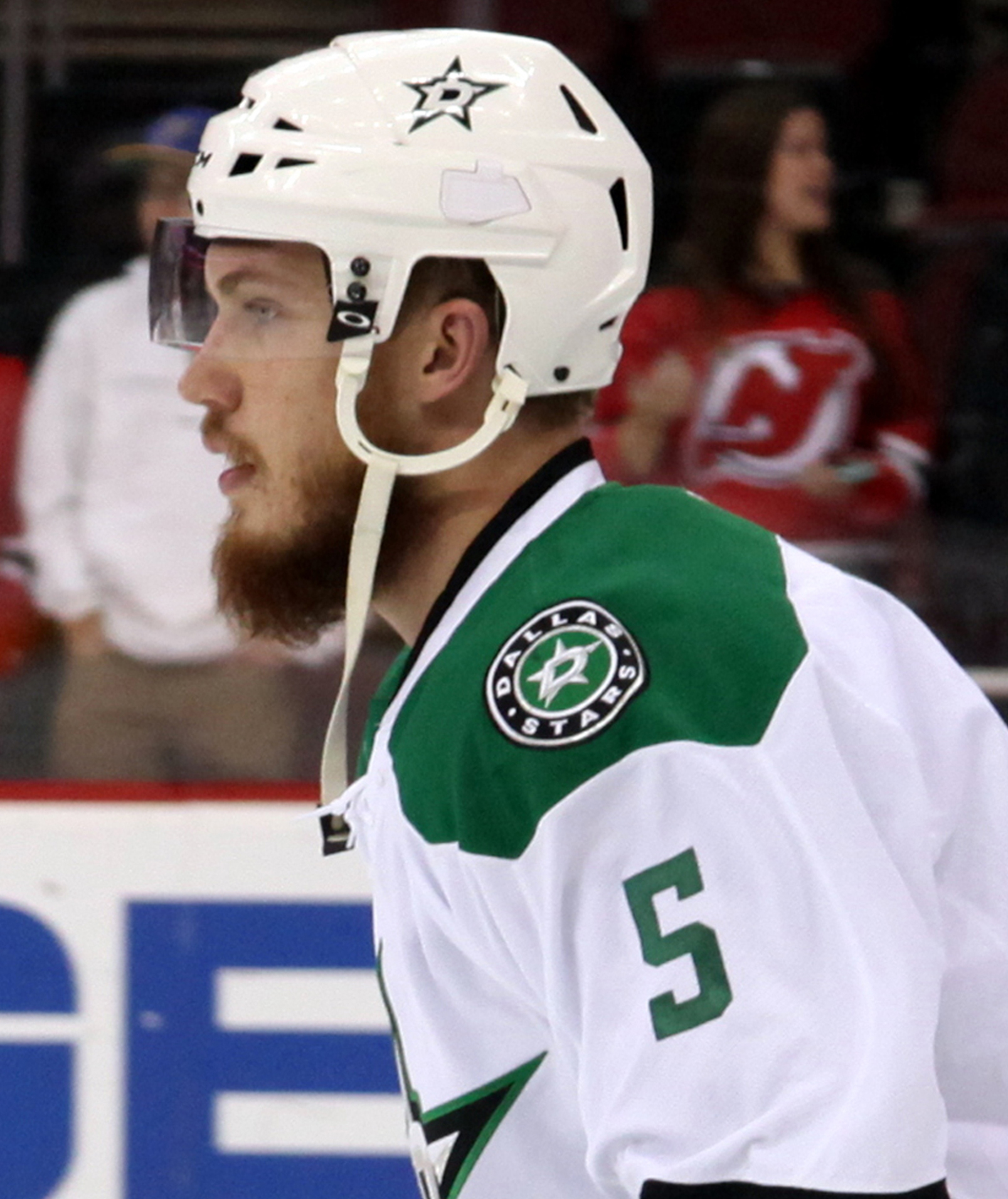
Oleksiak with the Dallas Stars in 2014.

In the final year of his entry-level contract, Oleksiak dipped in production at the AHL level but tallied eight points through 36 games with the Dallas Stars in the NHL. For the first time, Oleksiak was named to the Dallas Stars' opening night roster for the 2014–15 season. He was one of six defencemen the Stars planned on relying on throughout the season. However, as injuries befell the roster, the Stars recalled numerous defencemen from their AHL affiliate through the season. Oleksiak scored his first career NHL goal on October 28, in the first period of an eventual 4–3 overtime loss to the St. Louis Blues. However, he struggled to continue to produce and was reassigned to the Texas Stars on December 11, after accumulating four points through 21 games. He recorded two shots on goal in one game with the Texas Stars before being recalled to the NHL level on December 13. He played one more game for the Dallas Stars before returning to the AHL on December 23. Upon returning to the AHL, Oleksiak recorded two assists through two games before returning to the NHL level on December 29. Throughout the months of January and February, Oleksiak and Jyrki Jokipakka split their time between the NHL and AHL. Oleksiak accumulated four more points with the Stars before returning to the AHL level in mid-January while the Dallas Stars were on break. Once the NHL resumed play, Oleksiak returned to the NHL level on January 26. He finished the NHL season with eight points through 36 games. On July 9, 2015, Oleksiak signed a one-year contract extension to remain with the Dallas Stars.

Following the signing of the contract extension, Oleksiak saw limited playing time during the 2015–16 season and was consistently a healthy scratch. He played in four of the Dallas Stars' first 20 games to begin the season. As he was waiver eligible, the Stars were reluctant to assign him to the AHL level. As the season continued, he recorded two assists and 37 hits through 11 games before being assigned to the Texas Stars on a conditioning assignment. At the time of the assignment, he had played one game since December 12. He skated in eight games for Texas during the assignment, recording one assist, before being recalled to the NHL level on February 1, 2016. Due to injuries to three of the Stars' top six defensemen, head coach Lindy Ruff opted to give Oleksiak, Kris Russell, Alex Goligoski, Johnny Oduya, and Patrik Nemeth longer minutes during games throughout March. However, he saw very little games during March and ended the season with two points in 19 games. Despite his poor performance, the Stars signed Oleksiak to another one-year contract on July 12, 2016.

Following the signing of the contract extension, Oleksiak experienced his first full season in the NHL with Dallas during the 2016–17 season. During the offseason, the Stars parted ways with veteran defencemen Alex Goligoski, Jason Demers, and Kris Russell, leaving an opening for Oleksiak to earn more playing time. He quickly made use of this opportunity and impressed head coach Lindy Ruff while paired with Esa Lindell in mid-October. However, he became a healthy scratch once again and missed nine games since October 20 before rejoining the lineup on November 10 as the Stars experienced a three-game losing streak. As he slowly became a mainstay in the lineup, Oleksiak began to bounce back from the previous season. He tallied five goals and one assist through 20 games before suffering a hand injury during a game against the Anaheim Ducks on January 13, 2017. He subsequently missed 13 games before returning on February 11 to play alongside Stephen Johns in a 5–2 win against the Carolina Hurricanes. Oleksiak finished the regular season with a career-high five goals and two assists for seven points through 41 games. On August 4, 2017, the Stars re-signed Oleksiak to a one-year, $964,688 contract.

==== Pittsburgh Penguins ====
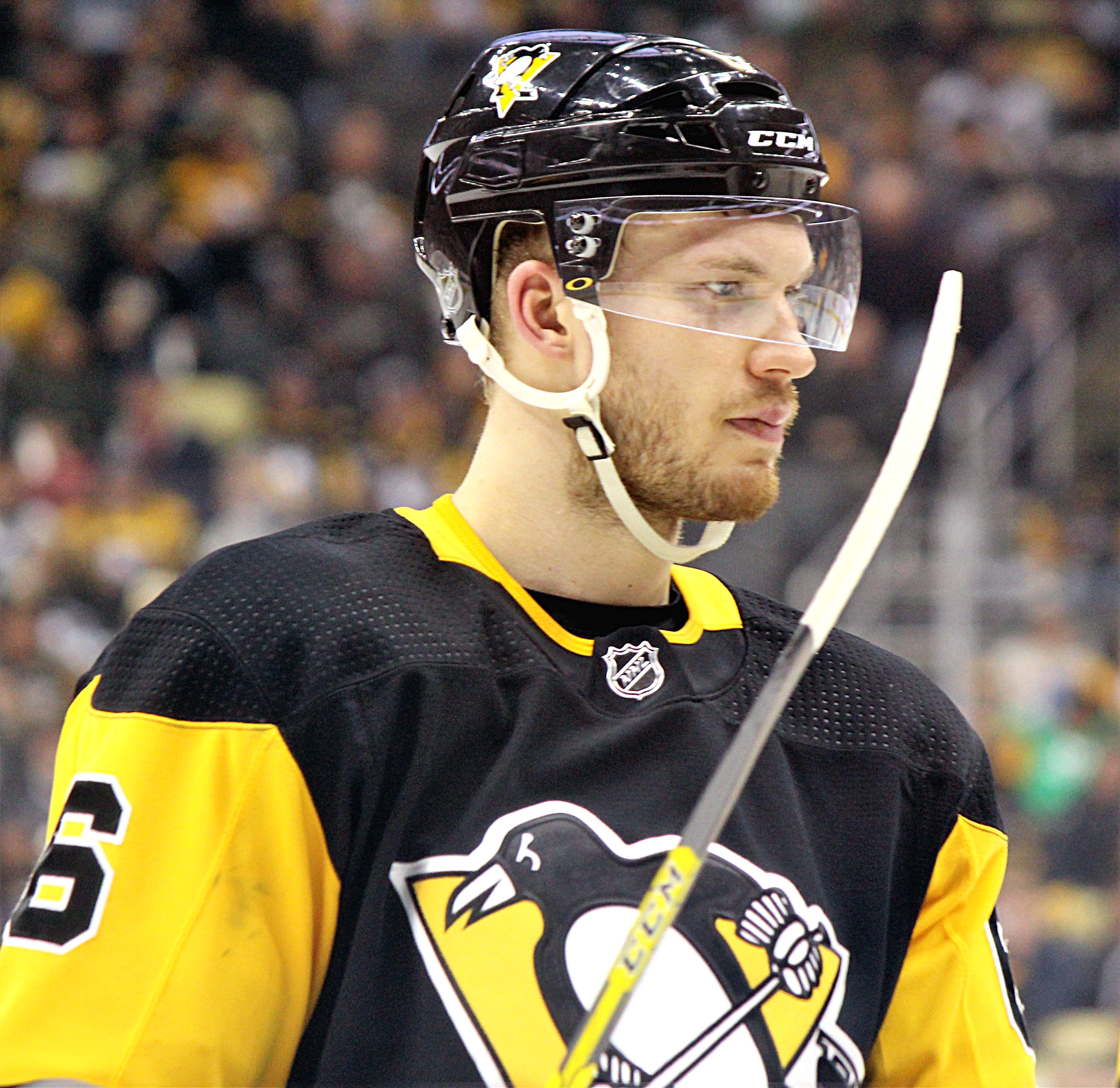
Oleksiak during a game with the Penguins in 2018.

Prior to the trade deadline for the 2017–18 season, Oleksiak was traded to the Pittsburgh Penguins in exchange for a conditional fourth-round pick in 2019 NHL entry draft. At the time of the trade, he had tallied one goal and two assists through 21 games with the Stars. Oleksiak immediately established his role with the Penguins as the right-shooting defencemen on their third defensive pairing. Through his first 33 games with the Penguins, he averaged 17:18 minutes while playing alongside Justin Schultz. He also accumulated three goals and six assists while playing in every game since the trade, never sitting in the press box as a healthy scratch. As the season continued, he was used largely on the team's bottom defensive pairing alongside Ian Cole, Matt Hunwick, or Chad Ruhwedel. Oleksiak finished the 2017–18 with career highs in games played with 68 as well as points with 17. Despite playing just a little over half a season with Pittsburgh, Oleksiak ranked fourth on the club with 138 hits and tied for 10th in the league. His play with the Penguins helped them clinch a playoff berth and he made his post-season debut when they faced off against the Philadelphia Flyers in the 2018 Stanley Cup playoffs. He played in all 12 games for the Penguins, tallying one goal during their series against the Washington Capitals. On July 12, 2018, Oleksiak as a restricted free agent, agreed to a three-year, $6.4 million contract extension with the Penguins.

Oleksiak returned to the Penguins for the 2018–19 season, his first full season with the team. When he played in his 200th NHL game with the Penguins on November 7, 2018, he had accumulated the same number of points (22) as he had with the Stars in nearly 100 fewer games. On December 19, 2018, Oleksiak fought Washington Capitals forward Tom Wilson in the first period and was briefly knocked unconscious. He left the game and did not return. After evaluation, the team announced that Oleksiak had suffered a concussion as a result of the fight and would be sidelined from game action indefinitely. He was eventually cleared to play on December 29 but was not placed back in the lineup immediately.

==== Return to Dallas ====
On January 28, 2019, Oleksiak was traded back to the Dallas Stars by the Penguins for the same fourth-round draft pick in 2019 that he was originally traded to Pittsburgh for. Upon returning to the Stars, Oleksiak was in and out of the Dallas lineup as their seventh defenseman. He went pointless through 18 games and was a healthy scratch when the Stars met with the Penguins on March 23. As the Stars clinched a playoff berth, Oleksiak returned to the lineup while key players sat out of back-to-back games in order to rest. While playing as a third-pairing defenseman along with Taylor Fedun, Oleksiak tallied an assist on Tyler Seguin's goal to help the Stars clinch the top wildcard spot in the 2019 Stanley Cup playoffs. Oleksiak was a healthy scratch for the first two games of their series against the Nashville Predators but earned some playing time in Game 3 in place of Fedun. In his 2019 post-season debut, Oleksiak recorded six hits through 10:45 minutes of ice time as the Stars lost 3–2. While playing alongside Ben Lovejoy, Oleksiak and the Stars eliminated the Predators in six games to advance to Round 2 of the Stanley Cup Playoffs. However, Oleksiak suffered a lower-body injury and was replaced by Fedun for Game 1 against the St. Louis Blues. He remained out of the Dallas lineup for the remainder of their series and subsequent elimination.

Under a new head coach, Oleksiak saw increased playing time as a third-pairing defenseman along with Taylor Fedun. In the first week of the 2019–20 season, Oleksiak tallied two assists in the season's first four games. He was one of 17 defensemen with at least two primary assists in five-on-five play by October 18, 2017. Oleksiak quickly became one of the most active Stars player in the offensive zone as he helped dominate scoring chances with Miro Heiskanen in a top four role. After Heiskanen and Radek Faksa were taken out of the lineup due to injuries, Oleksiak began to play alongside Stephen Johns.

==== Seattle Kraken ====
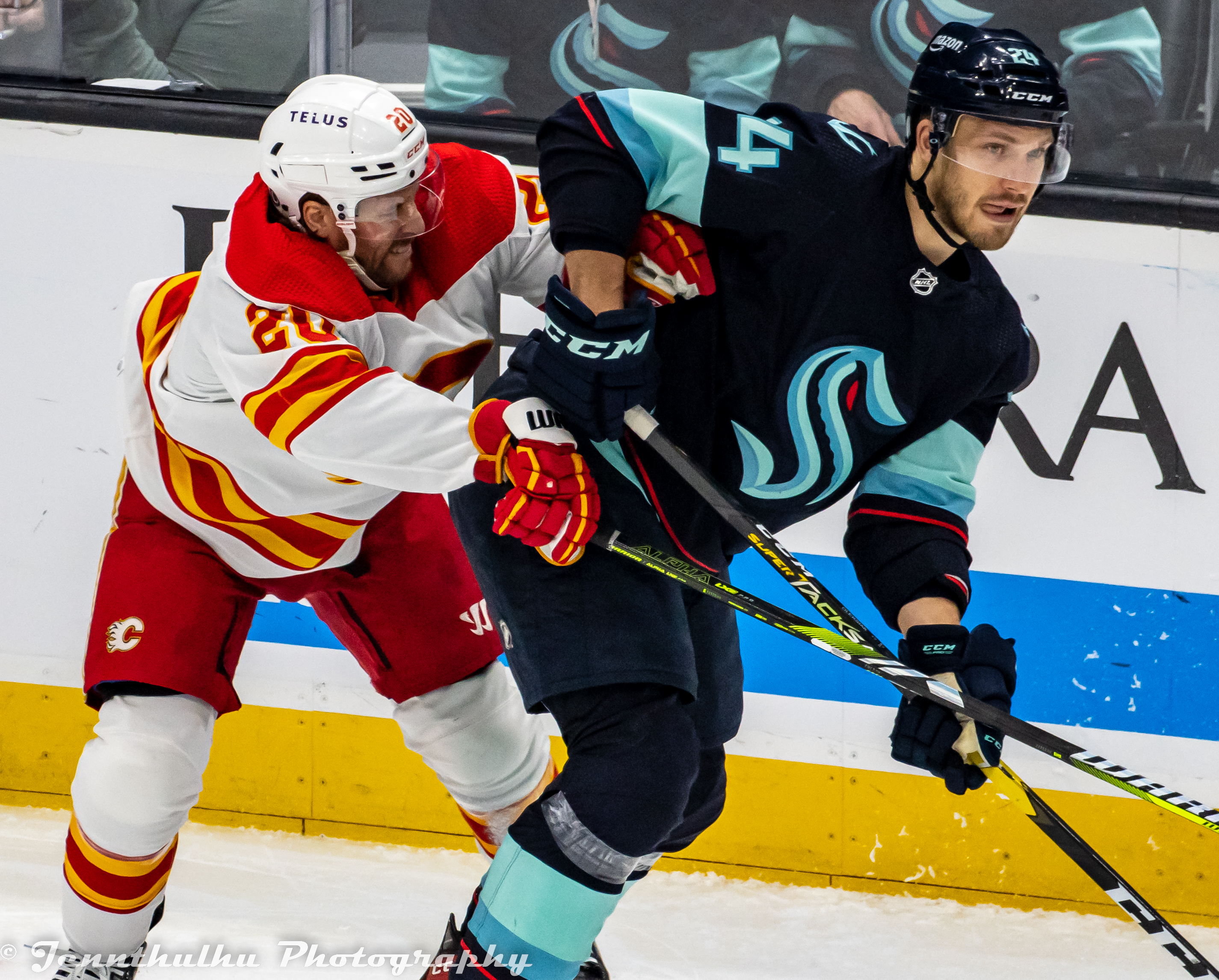
Oleksiak (right) playing for the Kraken in 2023.

On July 21, 2021, Oleksiak was selected from the Stars at the 2021 NHL expansion draft by the Seattle Kraken. Following the draft, Oleksiak was immediately signed to a five-year, $23 million contract by the Kraken. He also changed his jersey number from #6 to #24 as veteran defenseman Adam Larsson wished to use the number. Although Oleksiak was originally in COVID protocol, he was cleared in time to play in the Kraken's first regular season game on October 13. On December 18, after scoring one goal and nine assists, Oleksiak was again placed on the league's COVID protocol list. Oleksiak finished the 2021–22 season with a career-high 16 assists and 17 points. He also ranked second on the team with 182 hits and third with 86 blocked shots.

Following his career-best season, Oleksiak returned to the Kraken for the 2022–23 season. Despite missing four games due to a lower-body injury, Oleksiak led all Seattle defensemen in goal scoring by late November. On December 10, 2022, Oleksiak was suspended three games for a hit to Alexander Alexeyev during a game against the Washington Capitals. At the time of the suspension, Oleksiak had accumulated four goals and three assists to rank third amongst Kraken defenceman.

==== Vancouver Canucks ====
On July 1, 2026, Oleksiak signed a two-year, $10 million contract with the Vancouver Canucks.

== International play ==
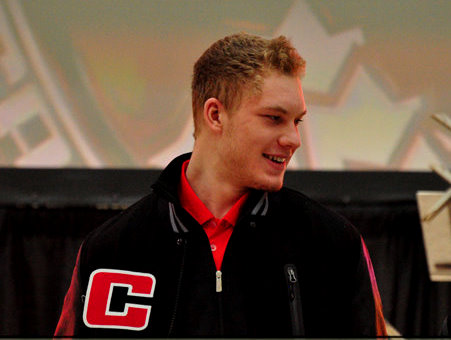
- Oleksiak as a member of Team Canada at the 2012 World Junior Championships.

Medal record

Representing Canada

Ice hockey

World Junior Championships
Bronze medal – third place	2012 Canada	

Although Oleksiak was born in Toronto, his father holds US citizenship which allows Oleksiak to compete for either Team USA or Team Canada. Oleksiak represented the United States in the 2009 Ivan Hlinka Memorial Tournament which finished in fourth place, but later decided he would represent Canada internationally, joining the Canadian junior team at the 2012 World Junior Ice Hockey Championships. Team Canada won the bronze medal.

Twelve years later, Oleksiak accepted an invitation to make his senior national team debut at the 2024 IIHF World Championship.

== Personal life ==
Oleksiak is of Polish and Czech descent. He attended school with both Dougie and Freddie Hamilton at Crestwood Preparatory College in Toronto, Ontario, before moving to the United States to pursue his career in hockey.

Oleksiak's youngest sister, Penny, is a competitive swimmer and Canada's most decorated Olympic athlete, having won a combined total of 7 medals at the 2016 Summer Olympics and 2020 Summer Olympics.

== Career statistics ==
=== Regular season and playoffs ===
			Regular season					Playoffs
Season	Team	League	GP	G	A	Pts	PIM	GP	G	A	Pts	PIM
2008–09	Chicago Steel	USHL	29	0	4	4	47	—	—	—	—	—
2009–10	Chicago Steel	USHL	29	0	10	10	43	—	—	—	—	—
2009–10	Sioux Falls Stampede	USHL	24	2	2	4	32	3	0	1	1	2
2010–11	Northeastern Huskies	HE	38	4	9	13	57	—	—	—	—	—
2011–12	Saginaw Spirit	OHL	31	6	5	11	24	—	—	—	—	—
2011–12	Niagara IceDogs	OHL	28	6	15	21	23	20	0	4	4	4
2012–13	Texas Stars	AHL	59	6	27	33	29	9	0	1	1	6
2012–13	Dallas Stars	NHL	16	0	2	2	14	—	—	—	—	—
2013–14	Texas Stars	AHL	69	5	18	23	31	21	0	5	5	8
2013–14	Dallas Stars	NHL	7	0	0	0	2	—	—	—	—	—
2014–15	Texas Stars	AHL	35	4	12	16	12	3	0	0	0	0
2014–15	Dallas Stars	NHL	36	1	7	8	8	—	—	—	—	—
2015–16	Dallas Stars	NHL	19	0	2	2	21	—	—	—	—	—
2015–16	Texas Stars	AHL	8	0	2	2	2	—	—	—	—	—
2016–17	Dallas Stars	NHL	41	5	2	7	37	—	—	—	—	—
2017–18	Dallas Stars	NHL	21	1	2	3	18	—	—	—	—	—
2017–18	Pittsburgh Penguins	NHL	47	4	10	14	69	12	1	0	1	7
2018–19	Pittsburgh Penguins	NHL	36	4	7	11	37	—	—	—	—	—
2018–19	Dallas Stars	NHL	21	0	1	1	8	4	0	0	0	0
2019–20	Dallas Stars	NHL	69	3	7	10	41	27	5	4	9	26
2020–21	Dallas Stars	NHL	56	6	8	14	35	—	—	—	—	—
2021–22	Seattle Kraken	NHL	72	1	16	17	54	—	—	—	—	—
2022–23	Seattle Kraken	NHL	75	9	16	25	72	14	1	2	3	8
2023–24	Seattle Kraken	NHL	82	2	13	15	37	—	—	—	—	—
2024–25	Seattle Kraken	NHL	82	4	13	17	34	—	—	—	—	—
2025–26	Seattle Kraken	NHL	78	5	10	15	36	—	—	—	—	—
NHL totals			758	45	116	161	523	57	7	6	13	41

=== International ===
Year	Team	Event	Result	GP	G	A	Pts	PIM
2009	United States	IH18	4th	4	0	1	1	2
2012	Canada	WJC	3rd place, bronze medalist(s)	6	0	0	0	2
2024	Canada	WC	4th	10	0	3	3	8
Junior totals				10	0	1	1	4
Senior totals				10	0	3	3	8

== Awards and honours ==
Award	Year
AHL
AHL All-Star Game	2013
Calder Cup champion	2014

Awards and achievements
Preceded by Jack Campbell	Dallas Stars first-round draft pick 2011	Succeeded by Radek Faksa
