= Petr Mocek =

Czech ice hockey player

- Born: December 8, 1980 (age 45) Pardubice, Czechoslovakia
- Height: 6 ft 3 in (191 cm)
- Weight: 205 lb (93 kg; 14 st 9 lb)
- Position: Defence
- Shot: Left
- Played for: HC Pardubice; HC Hradec Králové; SK Horácká Slavia Třebíč; Hokki; HC Kosice; HK Trebisov; HC Chrudim; HC Vrchlabí; HC Energie Karlovy Vary; Rytíři Kladno; HC Dukla Jihlava; Yuzhny Ural Orsk; HC Dvůr Králové nad Labem
- Playing career: 2001–2020

Petr Mocek (born December 8, 1980) is a Czech professional ice hockey defenceman. He played with HC Pardubice in the Czech Extraliga during the 2010–11 Czech Extraliga season.

Mocek previously played for HC Košice, HC Hradec Králové and HC Chrudim.

== Career statistics ==
			Regular season					Playoffs
Season	Team	League	GP	G	A	Pts	PIM	GP	G	A	Pts	PIM
1999–00	HC Pardubice U20	Czech U20	48	3	11	14	76	6	3	3	6	26
2000–01	HC Pardubice U20	Czech U20	45	2	12	14	127	7	1	2	3	28
2000–01	HC Pardubice	Czech	1	0	1	1	0	—	—	—	—	—
2000–01	HC Hradec Králové	Czech3	9	2	2	4	2	—	—	—	—	—
2001–02	SK Horácká Slavia Třebíč	Czech2	37	3	9	12	52	7	0	0	0	2
2002–03	HC Pardubice	Czech	3	0	0	0	4	—	—	—	—	—
2002–03	SK Horácká Slavia Třebíč	Czech2	37	5	5	10	84	—	—	—	—	—
2003–04	HC Hradec Králové	Czech2	36	1	6	7	56	3	0	1	1	0
2004–05	Hokki	Mestis	34	3	5	8	40	4	1	0	1	2
2005–06	HC Hradec Králové	Czech2	48	4	7	11	42	9	0	3	3	12
2006–07	HC Hradec Králové	Czech2	50	7	19	26	103	2	0	0	0	2
2007–08	HC Kosice	Slovak	45	1	1	2	28	19	1	1	2	16
2007–08	HK Trebisov	Slovak2	2	1	1	2	4	—	—	—	—	—
2008–09	HC Kosice	Slovak	42	1	3	4	51	16	0	0	0	20
2009–10	HC Pardubice	Czech	5	0	0	0	0	—	—	—	—	—
2009–10	HC Chrudim	Czech2	42	8	12	20	88	—	—	—	—	—
2010–11	HC Pardubice	Czech	5	0	0	0	0	2	0	0	0	0
2010–11	HC Vrchlabí	Czech2	7	0	0	0	0	—	—	—	—	—
2010–11	HC Chrudim	Czech2	37	2	5	7	26	—	—	—	—	—
2011–12	HC Energie Karlovy Vary	Czech	46	1	9	10	28	—	—	—	—	—
2012–13	Rytiri Kladno	Czech	33	1	1	2	47	—	—	—	—	—
2012–13	HC Pardubice	Czech	12	0	2	2	20	5	0	1	1	8
2013–14	HC Pardubice	Czech	1	0	1	1	4	—	—	—	—	—
2013–14	HC Dukla Jihlava	Czech2	48	4	9	13	42	9	2	1	3	8
2014–15	Yuzhny Ural Orsk	VHL	20	1	2	3	18	—	—	—	—	—
2014–15	HC Pardubice	Czech	—	—	—	—	—	2	0	0	0	2
2014–15	HC Dukla Jihlava	Czech2	11	2	4	6	2	11	0	0	0	45
2019–20	HC Dvůr Králové nad Labem	Czech3	33	2	10	12	22	—	—	—	—	—
Czech totals			106	2	14	16	103	21	0	4	4	24
Czech2 totals			353	36	76	112	495	45	2	5	7	79
Slovak totals			87	2	4	6	79	35	1	1	2	36
