= List of Dallas Stars draft picks =

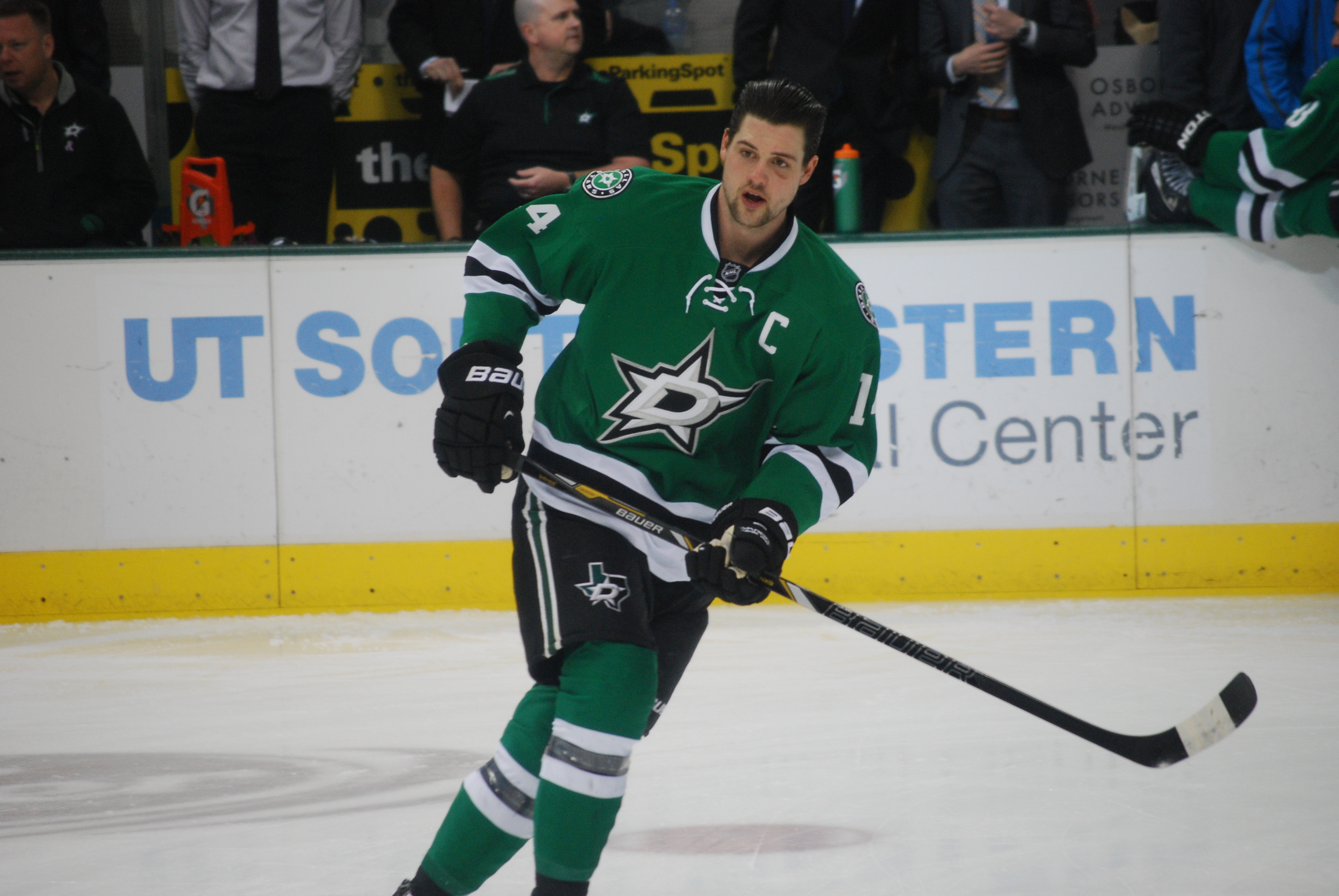
The Stars selected Jamie Benn 129th overall in the 2007 NHL entry draft.

This is a complete list of ice hockey players who were drafted in the National Hockey League Entry Draft by the Dallas Stars. It includes every player who was drafted, regardless of whether they played for the team. It does not include Minnesota North Stars draft picks.

== Key ==
Played at least one game with the Stars
Spent entire NHL career with the Stars

General terms and abbreviations
Term or abbreviation	Definition
Draft	The year that the player was selected
Round	The round of the draft in which the player was selected
Pick	The overall position in the draft at which the player was selected
S	Supplemental draft selection

Position abbreviations
Abbreviation	Definition
G	Goaltender
D	Defense
LW	Left wing
C	Center
RW	Right wing
F	Forward

Abbreviations for statistical columns
Abbreviation	Definition
Pos	Position
GP	Games played
G	Goals
A	Assists
Pts	Points
PIM	Penalties in minutes
W	Wins
L	Losses
T	Ties
OT	Overtime/shootout losses
GAA	Goals against average
—	Does not apply

== Draft picks ==
Statistics are complete as of the 2025-26 NHL season and show each player's career regular season totals in the NHL. Wins, losses, ties, overtime losses and goals against average apply to goaltenders and are used only for players at that position.

Draft	Round	Pick	Player	Nationality	Pos	GP	G	A	Pts	PIM	W	L	T	OT	GAA
1993	1	9	Todd Harvey	Canada	RW	671	91	132	223	950	—	—	—	—	—
1993	2	35	Jamie Langenbrunner	United States	RW	1109	243	420	663	837	—	—	—	—	—
1993	4	87	Chad Lang	Canada	G	—	—	—	—	—	—	—	—	—	—
1993	6	136	Rick Mrozik	United States	D	2	0	0	0	0	—	—	—	—	—
1993	6	139	Per Svartvadet	Sweden	RW	247	17	34	51	58	—	—	—	—	—
1993	7	165	Jeremy Stasiuk	Canada	RW	—	—	—	—	—	—	—	—	—	—
1993	8	191	Rob Lurtsema	United States	W	—	—	—	—	—	—	—	—	—	—
1993	10	243	Jordan Willis	Canada	G	1	0	0	0	0	0	1	0	—	3.16
1993	10	249	Bill Lang	Canada	C	—	—	—	—	—	—	—	—	—	—
1993	11	269	Cory Peterson	United States	D	—	—	—	—	—	—	—	—	—	—
1993	S	9	Jacques Joubert	United States	C	—	—	—	—	—	—	—	—	—	—
1994	1	20	Jason Botterill	Canada	LW	88	5	9	14	89	—	—	—	—	—
1994	2	46	Lee Jinman	Canada	C	—	—	—	—	—	—	—	—	—	—
1994	4	98	Jamie Wright	Canada	LW	124	12	20	32	54	—	—	—	—	—
1994	5	124	Marty Turco	Canada	G	543	0	22	22	168	275	167	26	40	2.36
1994	6	150	Evgeny Petrochinin	Russia	D	—	—	—	—	—	—	—	—	—	—
1994	9	228	Marty Flichel	Canada	RW	—	—	—	—	—	—	—	—	—	—
1994	10	254	Jimmy Roy	Canada	LW	—	—	—	—	—	—	—	—	—	—
1994	11	280	Chris Szysky	Canada	RW	—	—	—	—	—	—	—	—	—	—
1995	1	11	Jarome Iginla	Canada	RW	1554	625	675	1300	1040	—	—	—	—	—
1995	2	37	Patrick Cote	Canada	LW	105	1	2	3	377	—	—	—	—	—
1995	3	63	Petr Buzek	Czech Republic	D	157	9	22	31	94	—	—	—	—	—
1995	3	69	Sergei Gusev	Russia	D	89	4	10	14	34	—	—	—	—	—
1995	5	115	Wade Strand	Canada	D	—	—	—	—	—	—	—	—	—	—
1995	6	141	Dominic Marleau	Canada	D	—	—	—	—	—	—	—	—	—	—
1995	7	173	Jeff Dewar	Canada	RW	—	—	—	—	—	—	—	—	—	—
1995	8	193	Anatoli Koveshnikov	Ukraine	C	—	—	—	—	—	—	—	—	—	—
1995	8	202	Sergei Luchinkin	Russia	RW	—	—	—	—	—	—	—	—	—	—
1995	9	219	Steve Lowe	Canada	C	—	—	—	—	—	—	—	—	—	—
1996	1	5	Richard Jackman	Canada	D	231	19	58	77	166	—	—	—	—	—
1996	3	70	Jon Sim	Canada	LW	469	75	64	139	314	—	—	—	—	—
1996	4	90	Mike Hurley	Canada	RW	—	—	—	—	—	—	—	—	—	—
1996	5	112	Ryan Christie	Canada	LW	7	0	0	0	0	—	—	—	—	—
1996	5	113	Evgeny Tsybuk	Russia	D	—	—	—	—	—	—	—	—	—	—
1996	7	166	Eoin McInerney	Canada	G	—	—	—	—	—	—	—	—	—	—
1996	8	194	Joel Kwiatkowski	Canada	D	282	16	29	45	245	—	—	—	—	—
1996	9	220	Nick Bootland	Canada	D	—	—	—	—	—	—	—	—	—	—
1997	1	25	Brenden Morrow	Canada	LW	991	265	310	575	1362	—	—	—	—	—
1997	2	52	Roman Lyashenko	Russia	C	139	14	9	23	55	—	—	—	—	—
1997	3	77	Steve Gainey	Canada	LW	33	0	2	2	34	—	—	—	—	—
1997	4	105	Marcus Kristoffersson	Sweden	LW	—	—	—	—	—	—	—	—	—	—
1997	5	132	Teemu Elomo	Finland	LW	—	—	—	—	—	—	—	—	—	—
1997	6	160	Alexei Timkin	Russia	LW	—	—	—	—	—	—	—	—	—	—
1997	7	189	Jeff McKercher	Canada	D	—	—	—	—	—	—	—	—	—	—
1997	8	216	Alexei Komarov	Russia	D	—	—	—	—	—	—	—	—	—	—
1997	9	242	Brett McLean	Canada	C	385	56	106	162	204	—	—	—	—	—
1998	2	39	John Erskine	Canada	D	491	15	39	54	865	—	—	—	—	—
1998	2	57	Tyler Bouck	Canada	LW	91	4	8	12	93	—	—	—	—	—
1998	3	86	Gabriel Karlsson	Sweden	LW	—	—	—	—	—	—	—	—	—	—
1998	6	153	Pavel Patera	Czech Republic	C	32	2	7	9	8	—	—	—	—	—
1998	6	173	Niko Kapanen	Finland	C	397	36	90	126	160	—	—	—	—	—
1998	7	200	Scott Perry	United States	F	—	—	—	—	—	—	—	—	—	—
1999	2	32	Michael Ryan	United States	LW	83	7	8	15	34	—	—	—	—	—
1999	2	66	Dan Jancevski	Canada	D	9	0	0	0	2	—	—	—	—	—
1999	3	96	Mathias Tjarnqvist	Sweden	RW	173	13	19	32	60	—	—	—	—	—
1999	4	126	Jeff Bateman	Canada	C	—	—	—	—	—	—	—	—	—	—
1999	5	156	Gregor Baumgartner	Austria	RW	—	—	—	—	—	—	—	—	—	—
1999	6	184	Justin Cox	Canada	C	—	—	—	—	—	—	—	—	—	—
1999	6	186	Brett Draney	Canada	LW	—	—	—	—	—	—	—	—	—	—
1999	7	215	Jeff MacMillan	Canada	D	4	0	0	0	0	—	—	—	—	—
1999	8	243	Brian Sullivan	United States	D	—	—	—	—	—	—	—	—	—	—
1999	9	265	Jamie Chamberlain	Canada	RW	—	—	—	—	—	—	—	—	—	—
1999	9	272	Mikhail Donika	Russia	D	—	—	—	—	—	—	—	—	—	—
2000	1	25	Steve Ott	Canada	C	848	109	179	288	1555	—	—	—	—	—
2000	2	60	Dan Ellis	Canada	G	212	0	6	6	6	87	79	0	18	2.79
2000	3	68	Joel Lundqvist	Sweden	C	134	7	19	26	56	—	—	—	—	—
2000	3	91	Alexei Tereshchenko	Russia	C	—	—	—	—	—	—	—	—	—	—
2000	4	123	Vadim Khomitsky	Russia	D	—	—	—	—	—	—	—	—	—	—
2000	5	139	Ruslan Bernikov	Russia	RW	—	—	—	—	—	—	—	—	—	—
2000	5	162	Artem Chernov	Russia	C	—	—	—	—	—	—	—	—	—	—
2000	6	192	Ladislav Vlcek	Czech Republic	C	—	—	—	—	—	—	—	—	—	—
2000	7	219	Marco Tuokko	Finland	LW	—	—	—	—	—	—	—	—	—	—
2000	7	224	Antti Miettinen	Finland	RW	539	97	133	230	234	—	—	—	—	—
2001	1	25	Jason Bacashihua	United States	G	38	0	1	1	2	7	17	—	4	3.19
2001	3	70	Yared Hagos	Sweden	C	—	—	—	—	—	—	—	—	—	—
2001	3	92	Anthony Aquino	Canada	RW	—	—	—	—	—	—	—	—	—	—
2001	4	126	Daniel Volrab	Czech Republic	C	—	—	—	—	—	—	—	—	—	—
2001	5	161	Mike Smith	Canada	G	670	1	20	21	152	299	263	—	78	2.70
2001	6	167	Michal Blazek	Czech Republic	D	—	—	—	—	—	—	—	—	—	—
2001	6	192	Jussi Jokinen	Finland	LW	951	191	372	563	377	—	—	—	—	—
2001	8	255	Marco Rosa	Canada	C	—	—	—	—	—	—	—	—	—	—
2001	9	265	Dale Sullivan	Canada	RW	—	—	—	—	—	—	—	—	—	—
2001	9	285	Marek Tomica	Czech Republic	LW	—	—	—	—	—	—	—	—	—	—
2002	1	26	Martin Vagner	Czech Republic	D	—	—	—	—	—	—	—	—	—	—
2002	2	32	Janos Vas	Hungary	LW	—	—	—	—	—	—	—	—	—	—
2002	2	34	Tobias Stephan	Switzerland	G	11	0	1	1	0	1	3	—	2	3.49
2002	2	42	Marius Holtet	Norway	C	—	—	—	—	—	—	—	—	—	—
2002	2	43	Trevor Daley	Canada	D	1058	89	220	309	648	—	—	—	—	—
2002	3	78	Geoff Waugh	Canada	D	—	—	—	—	—	—	—	—	—	—
2002	4	110	Jarkko Immonen	Finland	F	—	—	—	—	—	—	—	—	—	—
2002	5	147	David Bararuk	Canada	LW	—	—	—	—	—	—	—	—	—	—
2002	6	180	Kirill Sidorenko	Russia	C	—	—	—	—	—	—	—	—	—	—
2002	7	210	Bryan Hamm	Canada	D	—	—	—	—	—	—	—	—	—	—
2002	8	243	Tuomas Mikkonen	Finland	LW	—	—	—	—	—	—	—	—	—	—
2002	9	273	Ned Havern	United States	LW	—	—	—	—	—	—	—	—	—	—
2003	2	33	Loui Eriksson	Sweden	LW	1050	253	360	613	200	—	—	—	—	—
2003	2	36	Vojtech Polak	Czech Republic	RW	5	0	0	0	0	—	—	—	—	—
2003	2	54	B. J. Crombeen	United States	RW	445	34	46	80	850	—	—	—	—	—
2003	3	99	Matt Nickerson	United States	D	—	—	—	—	—	—	—	—	—	—
2003	4	134	Alexander Naurov	Russia	LW	—	—	—	—	—	—	—	—	—	—
2003	5	144	Eero Kilpelainen	Finland	G	—	—	—	—	—	—	—	—	—	—
2003	5	165	Gino Guyer	United States	C	—	—	—	—	—	—	—	—	—	—
2003	6	185	Francis Wathier	Canada	LW	10	0	0	0	5	—	—	—	—	—
2003	6	195	Drew Bagnall	Canada	D	2	0	0	0	4	—	—	—	—	—
2003	6	196	Elias Granath	Sweden	D	—	—	—	—	—	—	—	—	—	—
2003	8	259	Niko Vainio	Finland	D	—	—	—	—	—	—	—	—	—	—
2004	1	28	Mark Fistric	Canada	D	325	4	30	34	284	—	—	—	—	—
2004	2	34	Johan Fransson	Sweden	D	—	—	—	—	—	—	—	—	—	—
2004	2	52	Raymond Sawada	Canada	RW	11	1	0	1	0	—	—	—	—	—
2004	2	56	Nicklas Grossmann	Sweden	D	592	13	73	86	314	—	—	—	—	—
2004	3	86	John Lammers	Canada	LW	—	—	—	—	—	—	—	—	—	—
2004	4	104	Fredrik Naslund	Sweden	LW	—	—	—	—	—	—	—	—	—	—
2004	6	183	Trevor Ludwig	United States	D	—	—	—	—	—	—	—	—	—	—
2004	7	218	Sergei Kukushkin	Belarus	LW	—	—	—	—	—	—	—	—	—	—
2004	8	248	Lukas Vomela	Czech Republic	D	—	—	—	—	—	—	—	—	—	—
2004	9	280	Matt McKnight	Canada	C	—	—	—	—	—	—	—	—	—	—
2005	1	28	Matt Niskanen	United States	D	949	72	284	356	489	—	—	—	—	—
2005	2	33	James Neal	Canada	LW	869	296	264	559	581	—	—	—	—	—
2005	3	71	Richard Clune	Canada	LW	139	7	15	22	327	—	—	—	—	—
2005	3	75	Perttu Lindgren	Finland	C	1	0	0	0	0	—	—	—	—	—
2005	5	146	Tom Wandell	Sweden	C	229	20	23	43	52	—	—	—	—	—
2005	5	160	Matt Watkins	Canada	RW	1	0	0	0	0	—	—	—	—	—
2005	7	223	Pat McGann	United States	G	—	—	—	—	—	—	—	—	—	—
2006	1	27	Ivan Vishnevskiy	Russia	D	5	0	2	2	2	—	—	—	—	—
2006	3	90	Aaron Snow	Canada	LW	—	—	—	—	—	—	—	—	—	—
2006	4	120	Richard Bachman	United States	G	49	0	1	1	0	20	18	—	2	2.97
2006	5	138	David McIntyre	Canada	C	7	1	1	2	2	—	—	—	—	—
2006	5	150	Max Warn	Finland	LW	—	—	—	—	—	—	—	—	—	—
2007	2	50	Nico Sacchetti	United States	C	—	—	—	—	—	—	—	—	—	—
2007	3	64	Sergei Korostin	Russia	RW	—	—	—	—	—	—	—	—	—	—
2007	4	112	Colton Sceviour	Canada	RW	535	66	90	156	136	—	—	—	—	—
2007	5	128	Austin Smith	United States	RW	—	—	—	—	—	—	—	—	—	—
2007	5	129	Jamie Benn	Canada	LW	1252	414	578	992	932	—	—	—	—	—
2007	5	136	Ondrej Roman	Czech Republic	LW	—	—	—	—	—	—	—	—	—	—
2007	5	149	Michael Neal	Canada	LW	—	—	—	—	—	—	—	—	—	—
2007	6	172	Luke Gazdic	Canada	LW	147	5	3	8	206	—	—	—	—	—
2008	2	59	Tyler Beskorowany	Canada	G	—	—	—	—	—	—	—	—	—	—
2008	3	89	Scott Winkler	Norway	C	—	—	—	—	—	—	—	—	—	—
2008	5	149	Philip Larsen	Denmark	D	151	9	28	37	46	—	—	—	—	—
2008	6	176	Matt Tassone	Canada	C	—	—	—	—	—	—	—	—	—	—
2008	7	209	Mike Bergin	Canada	D	—	—	—	—	—	—	—	—	—	—
2009	1	8	Scott Glennie	Canada	RW	1	0	0	0	2	—	—	—	—	—
2009	2	38	Alex Chiasson	Canada	RW	651	120	113	233	359	—	—	—	—	—
2009	3	69	Reilly Smith	Canada	RW	988	242	337	579	238	—	—	—	—	—
2009	5	129	Tomas Vincour	Czech Republic	C	95	7	10	17	12	—	—	—	—	—
2009	6	159	Curtis McKenzie	Canada	LW	99	10	13	23	131	—	—	—	—	—
2010	1	11	Jack Campbell	United States	G	176	0	3	3	2	93	52	—	18	2.76
2010	2	41	Patrik Nemeth	Sweden	D	504	10	60	70	240	—	—	—	—	—
2010	3	77	Alex Guptill	Canada	LW	—	—	—	—	—	—	—	—	—	—
2010	4	109	Alex Theriau	Canada	D	—	—	—	—	—	—	—	—	—	—
2010	5	131	John Klingberg	Sweden	D	700	92	351	443	287	—	—	—	—	—
2011	1	14	Jamie Oleksiak	Canada	D	758	45	116	161	523	—	—	—	—	—
2011	2	44	Brett Ritchie	Canada	RW	391	50	35	85	255	—	—	—	—	—
2011	4	105	Emil Molin	Sweden	C	—	—	—	—	—	—	—	—	—	—
2011	5	135	Troy Vance	United States	D	—	—	—	—	—	—	—	—	—	—
2011	6	165	Matej Stransky	Czech Republic	RW	—	—	—	—	—	—	—	—	—	—
2011	7	195	Jyrki Jokipakka	Finland	D	150	3	25	28	34	—	—	—	—	—
2012	1	13	Radek Faksa	Czech Republic	C	766	96	136	232	404	—	—	—	—	—
2012	2	43	Ludwig Bystrom	Sweden	D	—	—	—	—	—	—	—	—	—	—
2012	2	54	Mike Winther	Canada	C	—	—	—	—	—	—	—	—	—	—
2012	2	61	Devin Shore	Canada	C	498	52	92	144	79	—	—	—	—	—
2012	3	74	Esa Lindell	Finland	D	766	60	189	249	178	—	—	—	—	—
2012	4	104	Gemel Smith	Canada	C	91	12	13	25	58	—	—	—	—	—
2012	5	134	Brandon Troock	Canada	RW	—	—	—	—	—	—	—	—	—	—
2012	5	144	Henri Kiviaho	Finland	G	—	—	—	—	—	—	—	—	—	—
2012	7	183	Dmitri Sinitsyn	Russia	D	—	—	—	—	—	—	—	—	—	—
2013	1	10	Valeri Nichushkin	Russia	RW	627	154	203	357	112	—	—	—	—	—
2013	1	29	Jason Dickinson	Canada	C	566	75	97	172	212	—	—	—	—	—
2013	2	40	Remi Elie	Canada	LW	107	7	15	22	28	—	—	—	—	—
2013	2	54	Philippe Desrosiers	Canada	G	—	—	—	—	—	—	—	—	—	—
2013	3	68	Niklas Hansson	Sweden	D	—	—	—	—	—	—	—	—	—	—
2013	4	101	Nick Paul	Canada	LW	537	104	110	214	214	—	—	—	—	—
2013	5	131	Cole Ully	Canada	LW	—	—	—	—	—	—	—	—	—	—
2013	5	149	Matej Paulovic	Slovakia	LW	—	—	—	—	—	—	—	—	—	—
2013	7	182	Aleksi Makela	Finland	D	—	—	—	—	—	—	—	—	—	—
2014	1	14	Julius Honka	Finland	D	87	2	11	13	28	—	—	—	—	—
2014	2	45	Brett Pollock	Canada	LW	—	—	—	—	—	—	—	—	—	—
2014	3	75	Alexander Peters	Canada	D	—	—	—	—	—	—	—	—	—	—
2014	4	105	Michael Prapavessis	Canada	D	—	—	—	—	—	—	—	—	—	—
2014	4	115	Brent Moran	Canada	G	—	—	—	—	—	—	—	—	—	—
2014	5	135	Miro Karjalainen	Finland	D	—	—	—	—	—	—	—	—	—	—
2014	6	154	Aaron Haydon	United States	D	—	—	—	—	—	—	—	—	—	—
2014	6	165	John Nyberg	Sweden	D	—	—	—	—	—	—	—	—	—	—
2014	7	195	Patrick Sanvido	Canada	D	—	—	—	—	—	—	—	—	—	—
2015	1	12	Denis Gurianov	Russia	RW	298	52	61	113	60	—	—	—	—	—
2015	2	49	Roope Hintz	Finland	LW	521	190	231	421	172	—	—	—	—	—
2015	4	103	Chris Martenet	United States	D	—	—	—	—	—	—	—	—	—	—
2015	5	133	Joseph Cecconi	United States	D	—	—	—	—	—	—	—	—	—	—
2015	6	163	Markus Ruusu	Finland	G	—	—	—	—	—	—	—	—	—	—
2016	1	25	Riley Tufte	United States	LW	28	3	1	4	10	—	—	—	—	—
2016	3	90	Fredrik Karlstrom	Sweden	C	8	0	1	1	0	—	—	—	—	—
2016	4	116	Rhett Gardner	Canada	C	41	1	1	2	10	—	—	—	—	—
2016	5	128	Colton Point	Canada	G	—	—	—	—	—	—	—	—	—	—
2016	5	146	Nick Caamano	Canada	LW	36	1	2	3	21	—	—	—	—	—
2016	6	176	Jakob Stenqvist	Sweden	D	—	—	—	—	—	—	—	—	—	—
2017	1	3	Miro Heiskanen	Finland	D	552	67	279	346	172	—	—	—	—	—
2017	1	26	Jake Oettinger	United States	G	305	0	6	6	8	184	78	—	33	2.53
2017	2	39	Jason Robertson	United States	LW	456	213	277	490	130	—	—	—	—	—
2017	4	101	Liam Hawel	Canada	C	—	—	—	—	—	—	—	—	—	—
2017	5	132	Jacob Peterson	Sweden	C	83	14	11	25	18	—	—	—	—	—
2017	6	163	Brett Davis	Canada	C	—	—	—	—	—	—	—	—	—	—
2017	7	194	Dylan Ferguson	Canada	G	3	0	0	0	0	1	1	—	0	2.81
2018	1	13	Ty Dellandrea	Canada	C	265	17	44	61	181	—	—	—	—	—
2018	2	44	Albin Eriksson	Sweden	RW	—	—	—	—	—	—	—	—	—	—
2018	3	75	Oskar Back	Sweden	C	145	9	19	28	18	—	—	—	—	—
2018	4	100	Adam Mascherin	Canada	LW	—	—	—	—	—	—	—	—	—	—
2018	4	106	Curtis Douglas	Canada	C	43	1	3	4	108	—	—	—	—	—
2018	5	137	Riley Damiani	Canada	C	7	1	1	2	2	—	—	—	—	—
2019	1	18	Thomas Harley	Canada	D	267	38	101	139	68	—	—	—	—	—
2019	4	111	Samuel Sjolund	Sweden	D	—	—	—	—	—	—	—	—	—	—
2019	5	142	Nicholas Porco	Canada	LW	—	—	—	—	—	—	—	—	—	—
2019	6	173	Benjamin Brinkman	United States	D	—	—	—	—	—	—	—	—	—	—
2020	1	30	Mavrik Bourque	Canada	C	156	31	35	66	30	—	—	—	—	—
2020	4	123	Antonio Stranges	United States	LW	—	—	—	—	—	—	—	—	—	—
2020	5	154	Daniel Ljungman	Sweden	C	—	—	—	—	—	—	—	—	—	—
2020	6	162	Yevgeni Oksentyuk	Belarus	LW	—	—	—	—	—	—	—	—	—	—
2020	6	185	Remi Poirier	Canada	G	—	—	—	—	—	—	—	—	—	—
2021	1	23	Wyatt Johnston	Canada	C	328	134	129	263	104	—	—	—	—	—
2021	2	47	Logan Stankoven	Canada	C	183	41	55	96	47	—	—	—	—	—
2021	2	48	Artyom Grushnikov	Russia	D	—	—	—	—	—	—	—	—	—	—
2021	3	73	Ayrton Martino	Canada	LW	—	—	—	—	—	—	—	—	—	—
2021	3	79	Justin Ertel	Canada	LW	—	—	—	—	—	—	—	—	—	—
2021	4	111	Conner Roulette	Canada	LW	—	—	—	—	—	—	—	—	—	—
2021	5	138	Jack Bar	Canada	D	—	—	—	—	—	—	—	—	—	—
2021	5	143	Jacob Holmes	Canada	D	—	—	—	—	—	—	—	—	—	—
2021	6	175	Francesco Arcuri	Canada	C	—	—	—	—	—	—	—	—	—	—
2021	7	207	Albert Sjöberg	Sweden	C	—	—	—	—	—	—	—	—	—	—
2022	1	18	Lian Bichsel	Switzerland	D	88	8	9	17	78	—	—	—	—	—
2022	2	50	Christian Kyrou	Canada	D	—	—	—	—	—	—	—	—	—	—
2022	3	83	George Fegaras	Canada	D	—	—	—	—	—	—	—	—	—	—
2022	4	115	Gavin White	Canada	D	—	—	—	—	—	—	—	—	—	—
2022	5	147	Maxim Mayorov	Russia	G	—	—	—	—	—	—	—	—	—	—
2022	6	179	Matthew Seminoff	Canada	RW	—	—	—	—	—	—	—	—	—	—
2023	2	61	Tristan Bertucci	Canada	D	—	—	—	—	—	—	—	—	—	—
2023	3	79	Brad Gardiner	Canada	C	—	—	—	—	—	—	—	—	—	—
2023	4	125	Aram Minnetian	United States	D	—	—	—	—	—	—	—	—	—	—
2023	5	157	Arno Tiefensee	Germany	G	—	—	—	—	—	—	—	—	—	—
2023	6	189	Angus Macdonell	Canada	C	—	—	—	—	—	—	—	—	—	—
2023	7	221	Sebastian Bradshaw	Canada	LW	—	—	—	—	—	—	—	—	—	—
2024	1	29	Emil Hemming	Finland	RW	—	—	—	—	—	—	—	—	—	—
2024	5	158	Niilopekka Muhonen	Finland	D	—	—	—	—	—	—	—	—	—	—
2024	7	222	William Samuelsson	Sweden	C	—	—	—	—	—	—	—	—	—	—
2025	3	94	Cameron Schmidt	Canada	RW	—	—	—	—	—	—	—	—	—	—
2025	4	126	Brandon Gorzynski	United States	C	—	—	—	—	—	—	—	—	—	—
2025	5	146	Atte Joki	Finland	C	—	—	—	—	—	—	—	—	—	—
2025	5	158	Mans Goos	Sweden	G	—	—	—	—	—	—	—	—	—	—
2025	6	190	Dawson Sharkey	Canada	RW	—	—	—	—	—	—	—	—	—	—
2025	7	222	Charlie Paquette	Canada	RW	—	—	—	—	—	—	—	—	—	—
2026	2	59	Jakub Vaněček	Czechia	D	—	—	—	—	—	—	—	—	—	—
2026	5	155	Ryan Brown	Canada	LW	—	—	—	—	—	—	—	—	—	—
2026	6	187	Anton Emil Wilde Larsen	Denmark	G	—	—	—	—	—	—	—	—	—	—
2026	7	197	Jasper Kuhta	Finland	C	—	—	—	—	—	—	—	—	—	—
2026	7	219	Mikhail Cherepanov	Russia	D	—	—	—	—	—	—	—	—	—	—

== See also ==
- List of Minnesota North Stars draft picks
