= Mark Fistric =

Canadian ice hockey player (born 1986)

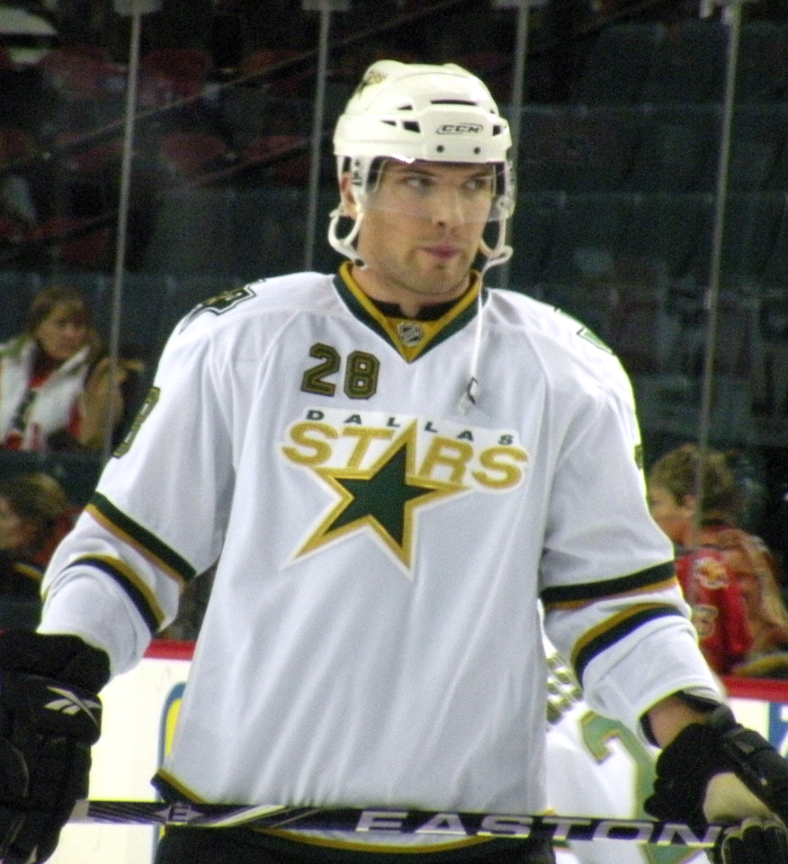
- Shown with the Dallas Stars in October 2009
- Born: June 1, 1986 (age 39) Edmonton, Alberta, Canada
- Height: 6 ft 2 in (188 cm)
- Weight: 233 lb (106 kg; 16 st 9 lb)
- Position: Defence
- Shot: Left
- Played for: Dallas Stars; Edmonton Oilers; Anaheim Ducks
- NHL draft: 28th overall, 2004; Dallas Stars
- Playing career: 2007–2015

Mark I. Fistric (born June 1, 1986) is a Canadian former professional ice hockey defenceman. He last played with the Anaheim Ducks of the National Hockey League (NHL). He was drafted by the Dallas Stars 28th overall in the first round of the 2004 NHL entry draft. He played major junior for the Vancouver Giants of the Western Hockey League (WHL).

== Playing career ==
Fistric began his major junior career in the WHL with the Vancouver Giants in 2001–02 while spending the majority of the season in the Alberta Midget Hockey League (AMHL), winning the Brian Benning Trophy as the league's top defenceman with the Maple Leaf Athletic Club.

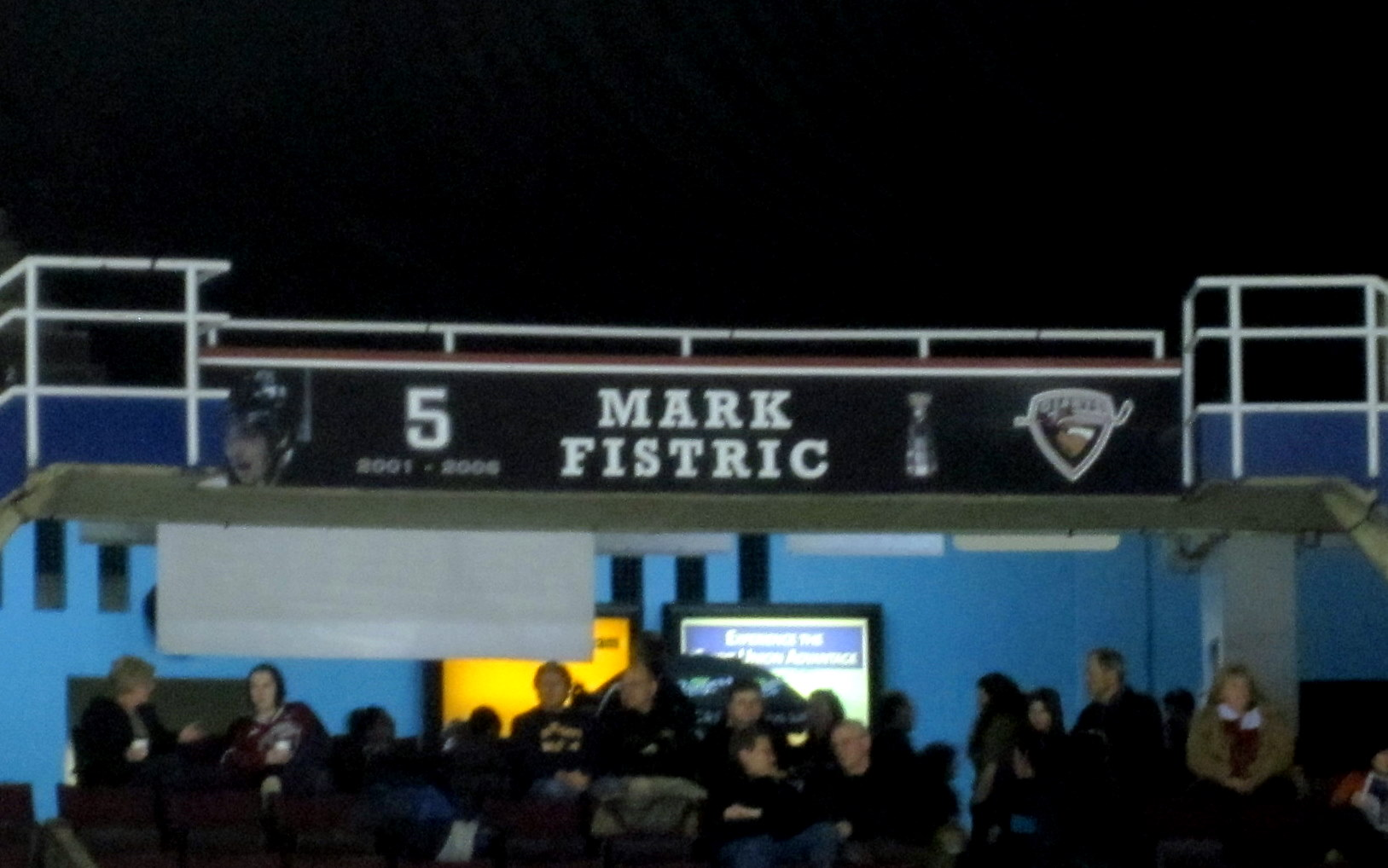
Fistric's banner in the Pacific Coliseum, as part of the Giants' Ring of Honour

After a 12-point campaign with the Giants in 2003–04, he was drafted in the first round, 28th overall, by the Dallas Stars in the 2004 NHL entry draft. He returned to the Giants but was kept out of the lineup for all but 15 games in the subsequent 2004–05 season. In his fourth and final WHL season, Fistric won the 2006 President's Cup with the Giants and competed in the 2006 Memorial Cup. Five years after graduating from junior, Fistric was inducted into the Giants' Ring of Honour, a series of banners commemorating the team's best alumni.

Turning pro in 2006–07, Fistric was assigned to the Iowa Stars, Dallas' American Hockey League (AHL) affiliate, and scored 24 points in his professional rookie season. He made his debut with Dallas the following season in 2007–08, splitting the campaign between Iowa and the NHL. He managed 2 assists in his 35-game NHL rookie season with the Stars. Fistric continued to split time between the Stars and the AHL in 2008–09, recording 4 assists in 36 games in his second NHL season. In the off-season, the Stars re-signed Fistric to a three-year, $3 million contract on July 8, 2009.

Fistric is known for his aggressive physical play. In a game against the Calgary Flames on January 27, 2010, Fistric received a match penalty for intent to injure after hitting opposing forward Eric Nystrom (who later became a Stars teammate) over the head with his own helmet during a fight, when the helmet became caught on his hand. The following day, he was fined $2,500 by the league for the incident.

On January 14, 2013, Prior to the lockout shortened 2012–13 season, Fistric was traded by the Stars to the Edmonton Oilers for a Third Round pick in the 2013 NHL Entry Draft.

On August 20, 2013, the Anaheim Ducks signed Fistric as a free agent to a one-year, $900,000 contract. In the 2013–14 season, Fistric was the Ducks depth defenseman, adding a physical element in 34 games. During the campaign, Fistric was signed to a three-year contract extension with Anaheim on January 29, 2014.

In the following 2014–15 season, Fistric effectiveness was hampered by a back injury, limiting him to just 9 regular season games. With the emergence of depth among the organization on the blueline, Fistric was placed on unconditional waivers and bought out from the final two-years of his contract with the Ducks on June 29, 2015.

== Career statistics ==
=== Regular season and playoffs ===
			Regular season					Playoffs
Season	Team	League	GP	G	A	Pts	PIM	GP	G	A	Pts	PIM
2001–02	Maple Leaf Athletic Club AAA	AMHL	30	8	10	18	85	2	1	1	2	4
2001–02	Vancouver Giants	WHL	4	0	1	1	0	—	—	—	—	—
2002–03	Vancouver Giants	WHL	63	2	7	9	81	4	0	0	0	8
2003–04	Vancouver Giants	WHL	72	1	11	12	192	11	0	2	2	10
2004–05	Vancouver Giants	WHL	15	1	5	6	32	6	1	1	2	16
2005–06	Vancouver Giants	WHL	60	7	22	29	148	18	1	9	10	30
2006–07	Iowa Stars	AHL	80	2	22	24	83	12	0	0	0	16
2007–08	Iowa Stars	AHL	30	1	4	5	48	—	—	—	—	—
2007–08	Dallas Stars	NHL	37	0	2	2	24	9	0	0	0	6
2008–09	Manitoba Moose	AHL	35	0	8	8	26	22	2	5	7	26
2008–09	Dallas Stars	NHL	36	0	4	4	42	—	—	—	—	—
2009–10	Dallas Stars	NHL	67	1	9	10	69	—	—	—	—	—
2010–11	Dallas Stars	NHL	57	2	3	5	44	—	—	—	—	—
2010–11	Texas Stars	AHL	3	0	0	0	2	—	—	—	—	—
2011–12	Dallas Stars	NHL	60	0	2	2	41	—	—	—	—	—
2012–13	Edmonton Oilers	NHL	25	0	6	6	32	—	—	—	—	—
2013–14	Anaheim Ducks	NHL	34	1	4	5	28	5	0	0	0	6
2013–14	Norfolk Admirals	AHL	2	0	0	0	4	—	—	—	—	—
2014–15	Anaheim Ducks	NHL	9	0	0	0	4	—	—	—	—	—
2014–15	Norfolk Admirals	AHL	34	1	6	7	84	—	—	—	—	—
2016–17	Stony Plain Eagles	ChHL	—	—	—	—	—	2	0	1	1	0
AHL totals			184	4	40	44	247	34	2	5	7	42
NHL totals			325	4	30	34	284	14	0	0	0	12

=== International ===
Year	Team	Event	GP	G	A	Pts	PIM
2003	Canada	U18	5	0	1	1	4
Junior totals			5	0	1	1	4

== Awards and honours ==
Award	Year
AMHL
Brian Benning Trophy (Top Defenceman)	2002
WHL
President's Cup (Vancouver Giants)	2006

== Ball hockey ==
As of 2012, Fistric annually competed in Division 8 of a Ball Hockey Association in Edmonton. As of 2013, Fistric also played summer hockey in the Strathcona Summer Hockey League.

Awards and achievements
Preceded by Martin Vagner	Dallas Stars first-round draft pick 2004	Succeeded by Matt Niskanen
