= Gregory Mocek =

Gregory Mocek (born 1962) is the former Director of Enforcement for the United States Commodity Futures Trading Commission in Washington, D.C. A native of Lafayette, Louisiana, he was appointed to that position in 2002, and oversaw approximately 150 attorneys and investigators in Washington, New York, Kansas City, and Chicago. Mocek was responsible for managing the commission's investigations and enforcement litigation nationwide. The commission's scope includes markets such as currency trading, financial futures contracts, agriculture, metals, and energy. In 2008, Mocek left the commission to enter private practice. He is currently a partner at Allen & Overy LLP, an international law firm and member of the UK's Magic Circle of leading law firms.

Mocek holds a B.S. in finance from the University of Louisiana at Lafayette, a J.D. from Tulane University, and an LL.M. from the Morin Center for Banking Law Studies at Boston University.
