= HC Chrudim =

- City: Chrudim, Czech Republic
- League: Krajská liga
- Founded: 1931
- Home arena: Zimní stadion Chrudim
- General manager: Vladimír Pitter
- Head coach: Martin Hosták

Franchise history
- 1931-1949: AFK Chrudim
- 1949-1974: Sokol Transports Chrudim
- 1974-1996: TJ Transporta Chrudim
- 1996-2011: HC Chrudim

HC Chrudim is an ice hockey team in Chrudim, Czech Republic. They played in the Czech 1.liga, the second level of ice hockey in the Czech Republic. The club was founded in 1931.

They folded in 2011 due to a lack of funding. A new club with the same name was then created, but it consists solely of junior and amateur teams.

== Achievements ==
- Promoted to Czech 2.liga : 2001
- Promoted to Czech 1.liga : 2008
