= 2014–15 Dallas Stars season =

National Hockey League team season

2014–15 Dallas Stars
- Division: 6th Central
- Conference: 10th Western
- 2014–15 record: 41–31–10
- Home record: 17–16–8
- Road record: 24–15–2
- Goals for: 261
- Goals against: 260

Team information
- General manager: Jim Nill
- Coach: Lindy Ruff
- Captain: Jamie Benn
- Alternate captains: Trevor Daley; Vernon Fiddler
- Arena: American Airlines Center
- Average attendance: 17,273 (41 games)

Team leaders
- Goals: Tyler Seguin (37)
- Assists: Jamie Benn (52)
- Points: Jamie Benn (87)
- Penalty minutes: Antoine Roussel (148)
- Plus/minus: Patrick Eaves (+8)
- Wins: Kari Lehtonen (33)
- Goals against average: Kari Lehtonen (2.82)

The 2014–15 Dallas Stars season was the 48th season for the National Hockey League (NHL) franchise that was established on June 5, 1967, and 22nd season since the franchise relocated from Minnesota prior to the start of the 1993–94 NHL season. Despite having 92 points, the Stars failed to qualify for the playoffs; even though they qualified the previous year.

== Standings ==
Central Division
Pos	Team	GP	W	L	OTL	ROW	GF	GA	GD	Pts
1	y – St. Louis Blues	82	51	24	7	42	248	201	+47	109
2	x – Nashville Predators	82	47	25	10	41	232	208	+24	104
3	x – Chicago Blackhawks	82	48	28	6	39	229	189	+40	102
4	x – Minnesota Wild	82	46	28	8	42	231	201	+30	100
5	x – Winnipeg Jets	82	43	26	13	36	230	210	+20	99
6	Dallas Stars	82	41	31	10	37	261	260	+1	92
7	Colorado Avalanche	82	39	31	12	29	219	227	−8	90

Source: National Hockey League
x – Clinched playoff spot; y – Clinched division

Western Conference Wild Card
Pos	Div	Team	GP	W	L	OTL	ROW	GF	GA	GD	Pts
1	CE	x – Minnesota Wild	82	46	28	8	42	231	201	+30	100
2	CE	x – Winnipeg Jets	82	43	26	13	36	230	210	+20	99
3	PA	Los Angeles Kings	82	40	27	15	38	220	205	+15	95
4	CE	Dallas Stars	82	41	31	10	37	261	260	+1	92
5	CE	Colorado Avalanche	82	39	31	12	29	219	227	−8	90
6	PA	San Jose Sharks	82	40	33	9	36	228	232	−4	89
7	PA	Edmonton Oilers	82	24	44	14	19	198	283	−85	62
8	PA	Arizona Coyotes	82	24	50	8	19	170	272	−102	56

Source: National Hockey League
x – Clinched playoff spot

== Suspensions/fines ==
Player	Explanation	Length	Salary	Date issued
Antoine Roussel	Punching an unsuspecting opponent, San Jose Sharks defenseman Justin Braun during NHL game No. 211 in Dallas on Saturday, November 8, 2014, at 18:51 of the third period.	—	$5,376.34	November 10, 2014
Ryan Garbutt	Kneeing Edmonton Oilers forward Taylor Hall during NHL game No. 319 in Dallas on Tuesday, November 25, 2014, at 12:17 of the third period.	2 games	$43,902.44	November 27, 2014
Ryan Garbutt	Slew-footing Winnipeg Jets defenseman Dustin Byfuglien during NHL game No. 416 in Dallas on Tuesday, December 9, 2014, at 13:22 of the third period.	3 games	$65,853.66	December 11, 2014
Antoine Roussel	Cross-checking Boston Bruins defenseman Adam McQuaid during NHL game No. 797 in Boston on Tuesday, February 10, 2015, at 3:43 of the first period.	2 games	$21,505.38	February 12, 2015

== Schedule and results ==
=== Pre-season ===
Pre-season game log: 4–2–0 (Home: 2–1–0; Road: 2–1–0)
#	Date	Visitor	Score	Home	OT	Decision	Attendance	Record	Recap
1	September 22	St. Louis	3–4	Dallas		Lindback	14,567	1–0–0	Recap
2	September 24	Dallas	4–3	Florida	SO	Rynnas	2,841	2–0–0	Recap
3	September 26	Dallas	3–6	Tampa Bay		Lehtonen	13,635	2–1–0	Recap
4^{[a]}	September 27	Dallas	4–2	St. Louis		Lindback		3–1–0	Recap
5	September 29	Florida	4–5	Dallas		Lindback	14,234	4–1–0	Recap
6	September 30	Tampa Bay	5–1	Dallas		Lindback	14,212	4–2–0	Recap
Notes:^{a} Game was played at Sprint Center in Kansas City, Missouri.

=== Regular season ===
Game log

October: 4–2–4 (Home: 1–0–4; Road: 3–2–0) 12 pts.
#	Date	Visitor	Score	Home	OT	Decision	Attendance	Record	Pts	Recap
1	October 9	Chicago	3–2	Dallas	SO	Lehtonen	18,768	0–0–1	1	Recap
2	October 11	Dallas	1–4	Nashville		Lindback	17,113	0–1–1	1	Recap
3	October 14	Dallas	4–2	Columbus		Lehtonen	15,995	1–1–1	3	Recap
4	October 16	Dallas	3–2	Pittsburgh		Lehtonen	18,615	2–1–1	5	Recap
5	October 18	Philadelphia	6–5	Dallas	OT	Lehtonen	18,532	2–1–2	6	Recap
6	October 21	Vancouver	3–6	Dallas		Lehtonen	15,678	3–1–2	8	Recap
7	October 24	Dallas	3–2	New Jersey	SO	Lehtonen	14,657	4–1–2	10	Recap
8	October 25	Dallas	5–7	NY Islanders		Lindback	15,208	4–2–2	10	Recap
9	October 28	St. Louis	4–3	Dallas	OT	Lehtonen	16,232	4–2–3	11	Recap
10	October 31	Anaheim	2–1	Dallas	OT	Lehtonen	15,343	4–2–4	12	Recap

November: 5–8–1 (Home: 3–5–1; Road: 2–3–0) 11 pts.
#	Date	Visitor	Score	Home	OT	Decision	Attendance	Record	Pts	Recap
11	November 1	Dallas	1–4	Minnesota		Lehtonen	19,088	4–3–4	12	Recap
12	November 4	Los Angeles	3–1	Dallas		Lehtonen	16,567	4–4–4	12	Recap
13	November 6	Nashville	3–2	Dallas		Lehtonen	17,054	4–5–4	12	Recap
14	November 8	San Jose	5–3	Dallas		Lindback	17,023	4–6–4	12	Recap
15	November 11	Dallas	4–3	Arizona		Lehtonen	11,866	5–6–4	14	Recap
16	November 13	Dallas	2–0	Los Angeles		Lehtonen	18,230	6–6–4	16	Recap
17	November 15	Minnesota	2–1	Dallas		Lehtonen	17,543	6–7–4	16	Recap
18	November 16	Dallas	2–6	Chicago		Lehtonen	21,671	6–8–4	16	Recap
19	November 18	Carolina	6–4	Dallas		Lehtonen	15,678	6–9–4	16	Recap
20	November 20	Arizona	1–3	Dallas		Lehtonen	16,078	7–9–4	18	Recap
21	November 22	Los Angeles	4–5	Dallas		Lehtonen	18,111	8–9–4	20	Recap
22	November 25	Edmonton	2–3	Dallas		Lehtonen	16,322	9–9–4	22	Recap
23	November 28	Minnesota	5–4	Dallas	OT	Lehtonen	18,532	9–9–5	23	Recap
24	November 29	Dallas	2–5	Colorado		Lindback	15,761	9–10–5	23	Recap

December: 8–4–0 (Home: 4–2–0; Road: 4–2–0) 16 pts.
#	Date	Visitor	Score	Home	OT	Decision	Attendance	Record	Pts	Recap
25	December 2	Dallas	3–5	Toronto		Lehtonen	19,021	9–11–5	23	Recap
26	December 4	Dallas	2–5	Detroit		Rynnas	20,027	9–12–5	23	Recap
27	December 6	Montreal	1–4	Dallas		Lehtonen	16,098	10–12–5	25	Recap
28	December 9	Winnipeg	5–2	Dallas		Lehtonen	15,987	10–13–5	25	Recap
29	December 13	New Jersey	3–4	Dallas		Lehtonen	16,110	11–13–5	27	Recap
30	December 17	Dallas	2–0	Vancouver		Lehtonen	18,755	12–13–5	29	Recap
31	December 19	Dallas	2–1	Calgary		Lehtonen	19,289	13–13–5	31	Recap
32	December 21	Dallas	6–5	Edmonton	SO	Lindback	16,839	14–13–5	33	Recap
33	December 23	Toronto	4–0	Dallas		Lehtonen	18,532	14–14–5	33	Recap
34	December 27	Dallas	4–3	St. Louis		Lehtonen	19,683	15–14–5	35	Recap
35	December 29	NY Rangers	2–3	Dallas		Lehtonen	18,532	16–14–5	37	Recap
36	December 31	Arizona	0–6	Dallas		Lehtonen	18,532	17–14–5	39	Recap

January: 6–5–2 (Home: 3–3–0; Road: 3–2–2) 14 pts.
#	Date	Visitor	Score	Home	OT	Decision	Attendance	Record	Pts	Recap
37	January 3	Minnesota	1–7	Dallas		Lehtonen	18,532	18–14–5	41	Recap
38	January 4	Dallas	4–5	Chicago	OT	Lehtonen	21,884	18–14–6	42	Recap
39	January 6	Columbus	4–2	Dallas		Lindback	17,123	18–15–6	42	Recap
40	January 8	Dallas	2–3	Nashville	OT	Lehtonen	17,113	18–15–7	43	Recap
41	January 10	Dallas	3–4	Colorado		Lehtonen	18,007	18–16–7	43	Recap
42	January 13	Ottawa	4–5	Dallas		Lindback	16,213	19–16–7	45	Recap
43	January 15	Winnipeg	2–1	Dallas		Lindback	16,221	19–17–7	45	Recap
44	January 17	Washington	4–5	Dallas		Lehtonen	18,532	20–17–7	47	Recap
45	January 18	Dallas	6–3	Chicago		Lehtonen	22,135	21–17–7	49	Recap
46	January 20	Boston	3–1	Dallas		Lehtonen	17,432	21–18–7	49	Recap
47	January 27	Dallas	2–3	Montreal		Lehtonen	21,286	21–19–7	49	Recap
48	January 29	Dallas	6–3	Ottawa		Lehtonen	18,752	22–19–7	51	Recap
49	January 31	Dallas	5–2	Winnipeg		Lehtonen	15,016	23–19–7	53	Recap

February: 4–6–3 (Home: 1–2–3; Road: 3–4–0) 11 pts.
#	Date	Visitor	Score	Home	OT	Decision	Attendance	Record	Pts	Recap
50	February 3	Colorado	3–2	Dallas	SO	Lehtonen	16,521	23–19–8	54	Recap
51	February 5	Tampa Bay	5–3	Dallas		Lehtonen	16,010	23–20–8	54	Recap
52	February 7	Dallas	2–3	Buffalo		Lindback	18,426	23–21–8	54	Recap
53	February 8	Dallas	3–2	NY Rangers	OT	Lehtonen	18,006	24–21–8	56	Recap
54	February 10	Dallas	5–3	Boston		Lehtonen	17,565	25–21–8	58	Recap
55	February 13	Florida	0–2	Dallas		Lehtonen	18,211	26–21–8	60	Recap
56	February 14	Dallas	1–4	Colorado		Enroth	18,087	26–22–8	60	Recap
57	February 17	Dallas	4–1	St. Louis		Lehtonen	18,830	27–22–8	62	Recap
58	February 19	San Jose	5–2	Dallas		Lehtonen	17,568	27–23–8	62	Recap
59	February 21	Detroit	7–6	Dallas	OT	Lehtonen	18,532	27–23–9	63	Recap
60	February 22	Dallas	2–6	Minnesota		Enroth	18,754	27–24–9	63	Recap
61	February 24	Dallas	2–4	Winnipeg		Enroth	15,016	27–25–9	63	Recap
62	February 27	Colorado	5–4	Dallas	SO	Lehtonen	15,431	27–25–10	64	Recap

March: 10–5–0 (Home: 4–3–0; Road: 6–2–0) 20 pts.
#	Date	Visitor	Score	Home	OT	Decision	Attendance	Record	Pts	Recap
63	March 1	Anaheim	3–1	Dallas		Enroth	17,657	27–26–10	64	Recap
64	March 3	NY Islanders	2–3	Dallas	OT	Lehtonen	17,453	28–26–10	66	Recap
65	March 5	Dallas	4–3	Florida	SO	Enroth	8,510	29–26–10	68	Recap
66	March 7	Dallas	4–5	Tampa Bay		Enroth	19,204	29–27–10	68	Recap
67	March 10	Dallas	2–1	Philadelphia		Lehtonen	18,723	30–27–10	70	Recap
68	March 12	Dallas	5–3	Carolina		Lehtonen	10,025	31–27–10	72	Recap
69	March 13	Dallas	4–2	Washington		Lehtonen	18,506	32–27–10	74	Recap
70	March 15	St. Louis	3–0	Dallas		Lehtonen	18,532	32–28–10	74	Recap
71	March 19	Pittsburgh	1–2	Dallas		Lehtonen	18,532	33–28–10	76	Recap
72	March 21	Chicago	0–4	Dallas		Lehtonen	18,532	34–28–10	78	Recap
73	March 23	Buffalo	3–4	Dallas		Lehtonen	18,113	35–28–10	80	Recap
74	March 25	Dallas	4–3	Calgary	SO	Lehtonen	19,289	36–28–10	82	Recap
75	March 27	Dallas	0–4	Edmonton		Lehtonen	16,839	36–29–10	82	Recap
76	March 28	Dallas	4–3	Vancouver	OT	Lehtonen	18,595	37–29–10	84	Recap
77	March 30	Calgary	5–3	Dallas		Lehtonen	17,898	37–30–10	84	Recap

April: 4–1–0 (Home: 1–1–0; Road: 3–0–0) 8 pts.
#	Date	Visitor	Score	Home	OT	Decision	Attendance	Record	Pts	Recap
78	April 3	St. Louis	7–5	Dallas		Lehtonen	18,532	37–31–10	84	Recap
79	April 4	Dallas	4–3	Nashville	OT	Enroth	17,113	38–31–10	86	Recap
80	April 6	Dallas	5–1	San Jose		Enroth	17,562	39–31–10	88	Recap
81	April 8	Dallas	4–0	Anaheim		Enroth	17,252	40–31–10	90	Recap
82	April 11	Nashville	1–4	Dallas		Enroth	18,532	41–31–10	92	Recap

Legend: Win (2 points) Loss (0 points) Overtime/shootout loss (1 point)

== Player statistics ==
Final

Skaters

Regular season
Player	GP	G	A	Pts	+/−	PIM
Jamie Benn	82	35	52	87	1	64
Tyler Seguin	71	37	40	77	−1	20
Jason Spezza	82	17	45	62	−7	28
Cody Eakin	78	19	21	40	−1	26
John Klingberg	65	11	29	40	5	32
Trevor Daley	68	16	22	38	−13	34
Alex Goligoski	81	4	32	36	0	24
Erik Cole^{‡}	57	18	15	33	4	14
Ales Hemsky	76	11	21	32	−8	16
Vernon Fiddler	80	13	16	29	−5	34
Shawn Horcoff	76	11	18	29	9	27
Patrick Eaves	47	14	13	27	12	8
Colton Sceviour	71	9	17	26	1	13
Antoine Roussel	80	13	12	25	−20	148
Ryan Garbutt	67	8	17	25	−9	55
Jason Demers^{†}	61	5	17	22	3	63
Jordie Benn	73	2	14	16	−5	34
Jyrki Jokipakka	51	0	10	10	−2	8
Brett Ritchie	31	6	3	9	−1	12
Travis Moen^{†}	34	3	6	9	0	14
Jamie Oleksiak	36	1	7	8	0	8
Curtis McKenzie	36	4	1	5	−8	48
Patrik Nemeth	22	0	3	3	0	6
Kevin Connauton^{‡}	8	0	2	2	4	6
Valeri Nichushkin	8	0	1	1	−5	2
Brenden Dillon^{‡}	20	0	1	1	−2	23
Sergei Gonchar^{‡}	3	0	1	1	−1	2
Travis Morin	6	0	0	0	1	0
Brendan Ranford	1	0	0	0	0	0
David Schlemko^{†‡}	5	0	0	0	0	0

Goaltenders

Regular season
Player	GP	GS	TOI	W	L	OT	GA	GAA	SA	SV%	SO	G	A	PIM
Kari Lehtonen	65	65	3,698	34	17	10	181	2.94	1875	.903	5	0	3	2
Jhonas Enroth^{†}	13	9	630	5	5	0	25	2.38	267	.906	1	0	0	0
Anders Lindback^{‡}	10	7	517	2	8	0	32	3.71	256	.875	0	0	1	0
Jussi Rynnas	2	1	92	0	1	0	7	4.57	44	.841	0	0	0	0

^{†}Denotes player spent time with another team before joining the Stars. Stats reflect time with the Stars only.
^{‡}Traded mid-season
Bold/italics denotes franchise record

== Notable achievements ==
=== Awards ===
Regular season
Player	Award	Awarded
T. Seguin	NHL First Star of the Week	October 20, 2014
T. Seguin	NHL Third Star of the Month	November 3, 2014
J. Benn	NHL Third Star of the Week	November 24, 2014
T. Seguin	NHL All-Star game selection	January 10, 2015
J. Klingberg	NHL Rookie of the Month	February 2, 2015
J. Benn	NHL First Star of the Week	April 13, 2015

=== Milestones ===
Regular season
Player	Milestone	Reached
C. McKenzie	1st career NHL game	October 18, 2014
S. Horcoff	300th career NHL assist	October 21, 2014
J. Jokipakka	1st career NHL game	October 24, 2014
J. Oleksiak	1st career NHL goal	October 28, 2014
T. Seguin	100th career NHL goal	October 28, 2014
T. Daley	700th career NHL game	November 4, 2014
T. Daley	200th career NHL point	November 6, 2014
J. Spezza	700th career NHL game 700th career NHL point	November 8, 2014
J. Klingberg	1st career NHL game	November 11, 2014
T. Seguin	300th career NHL game	November 15, 2014
C. McKenzie	1st career NHL goal 1st career NHL point	November 16, 2014
J. Klingberg	1st career NHL assist 1st career NHL point	November 16, 2014
E. Cole	500th career NHL point	November 16, 2014
J. Klingberg	1st career NHL goal	November 20, 2014
J. Jokipakka	1st career NHL assist 1st career NHL point	November 28, 2014
J. Demers	100th career NHL point	November 28, 2014
A. Hemsky	500th career NHL point	November 28, 2014
S. Horcoff	900th career NHL game	December 6, 2014
T. Moen	700th career NHL game	December 6, 2014
A. Hemsky	700th career NHL game	December 19, 2014
J. Benn	300th career NHL point	December 19, 2014
B. Ritchie	1st career NHL game 1st career NHL goal 1st career NHL point	December 31, 2014
K. Lehtonen	30th career NHL shutout	December 31, 2014
B. Ritchie	1st career NHL assist	January 3, 2015
C. Eakin	200th career NHL game	January 17, 2015
V. Fiddler	700th career NHL game	January 20, 2015
A. Lindback	5,000 career NHL minutes	February 7, 2015
J. Benn	400th career NHL game	February 14, 2015
J. Benn	1st career NHL hat-trick	February 17, 2015
C. McKenzie	1st career NHL assist	March 10, 2015
K. Lehtonen	500th career NHL game	March 12, 2015
P. Nemeth	1st career NHL assist 1st career NHL point	March 13, 2015
C. Eakin	100th career NHL point	March 19, 2015
J. Benn	200th career NHL assist	March 23, 2015
A. Roussel	200th career NHL game	April 11, 2015

== Transactions ==
The Stars have been involved in the following transactions during the 2014–15 season:

=== Trades ===
Date	Details
July 1, 2014	To Ottawa Senators Alex Chiasson; Nick Paul; Alex Guptill; 2nd-round pick in 2015	To Dallas Stars Jason Spezza; Ludwig Karlsson
November 11, 2014	To Montreal Canadiens Sergei Gonchar	To Dallas Stars Travis Moen
November 21, 2014	To San Jose Sharks Brenden Dillon	To Dallas Stars Jason Demers; 3rd-round pick in 2016
February 11, 2015	To Buffalo Sabres Anders Lindback conditional 3rd-round pick in 2016	To Dallas Stars Jhonas Enroth
March 1, 2015	To Detroit Red Wings Erik Cole conditional 3rd-round pick in 2015	To Dallas Stars Mattias Backman; Mattias Janmark; 2nd-round pick in 2015

=== Free agents acquired ===
Date	Player	Former team	Contract terms (in U.S. dollars)	Ref
July 1, 2014	Anders Lindback	Tampa Bay Lightning	1 year, $925,000	
July 1, 2014	Ales Hemsky	Ottawa Senators	3 years, $12 million	
July 1, 2014	Patrick Eaves	Nashville Predators	1 year, $650,000	
July 1, 2014	Brendan Ranford	Texas Stars	2 year, $1.22 million entry-level contract	
July 7, 2014	Jussi Rynnas	Karpat	2 years, $1.125 million	

=== Free agents lost ===
Date	Player	New team	Contract terms (in U.S. dollars)	Ref
July 1, 2014	Chris Mueller	New York Rangers	1 year, $600,000	
July 1, 2014	Dustin Jeffrey	Vancouver Canucks	1 year, $600,000	

=== Claimed via waivers ===
Player	Previous team	Date
David Schlemko	Arizona Coyotes	January 3, 2015

=== Lost via waivers ===
Player	New team	Date
Kevin Connauton	Columbus Blue Jackets	November 18, 2014
David Schlemko	Calgary Flames	March 1, 2015

=== Player signings ===
Date	Player	Contract terms (in U.S. dollars)	Ref
July 2, 2014	Vernon Fiddler	2 years, $2.5 million	
July 11, 2014	Cameron Gaunce	1 year, $650,000	
July 14, 2014	Julius Honka	3 year, $2.775 million entry-level contract	
July 22, 2014	Antoine Roussel	4 years, $8 million	
July 31, 2014	Scott Glennie	1 year, $650,000	
September 29, 2014	Cody Eakin	2 years, $3.8 million	
October 2, 2014	Brenden Dillon	1 year, $1.25 million	
November 21, 2014	Jason Spezza	4 years, $30 million contract extension	
December 19, 2014	Cole Ully	3 years, entry-level contract	
January 23, 2015	Travis Morin	2 years, contract extension	
March 10, 2015	Devin Shore	3 years, entry-level contract	
April 17, 2015	John Klingberg	7 years, $29.75 million contract extension	
June 15, 2015	Jyrki Jokipakka	2 years, contract extension	
June 17, 2015	Jack Campbell	1 year, contract extension	
June 17, 2015	Patrik Nemeth	2 years, contract extension	

== Draft picks ==
The 2014 NHL entry draft will be held on June 27–28, 2014, at the Wells Fargo Center in Philadelphia, Pennsylvania.

Round	#	Player	Pos	Nationality	College/junior/club team (league)
1	14	Julius Honka	D	Finland	Swift Current Broncos (WHL)
2	45	Brett Pollock	LW	Canada	Edmonton Oil Kings (WHL)
3	75	Alexander Peters	D	Canada	Plymouth Whalers (OHL)
4	105	Michael Prapavessis	D	Canada	Toronto Lakeshore Patriots (OJHL)
4	115^{[a]}	Brent Moran	G	Canada	Niagara IceDogs (OHL)
5	135	Miro Karjalainen	D	Finland	Jokerit U18 (FINLAND-JR. U18)
6	154^{[b]}	Aaron Haydon	D	United States	Niagara IceDogs (OHL)
6	165	John Nyberg	LW	Sweden	Frolunda Jr. (Sweden Jr)
7	195	Patrick Sanvido	D	Canada	Windsor Spitfires (OHL)

Draft notes

- ^{a} The Anaheim Ducks' fourth-round pick went to the Dallas Stars as the result of a trade on March 4, 2014, that sent Stephane Robidas to Anaheim in exchange for this pick (being conditional at the time of the trade). The condition – Dallas will receive a third-round pick in 2014 if Anaheim advances to the 2014 Western Conference Final and Robidas plays in at least 50% of Anaheim's playoff games. If both conditions are not converted then this will remain a fourth-round pick. – was converted on April 21, 2014, when Robidas was injured for the remainder of the 2014 Stanley Cup playoffs.
- ^{b} The Calgary Flames' sixth-round pick went to the Dallas Stars as the result of a trade on November 22, 2013, that sent Lane MacDermid to Calgary in exchange for this pick.
