= Brett Ritchie =

Canadian ice hockey player (born 1993)

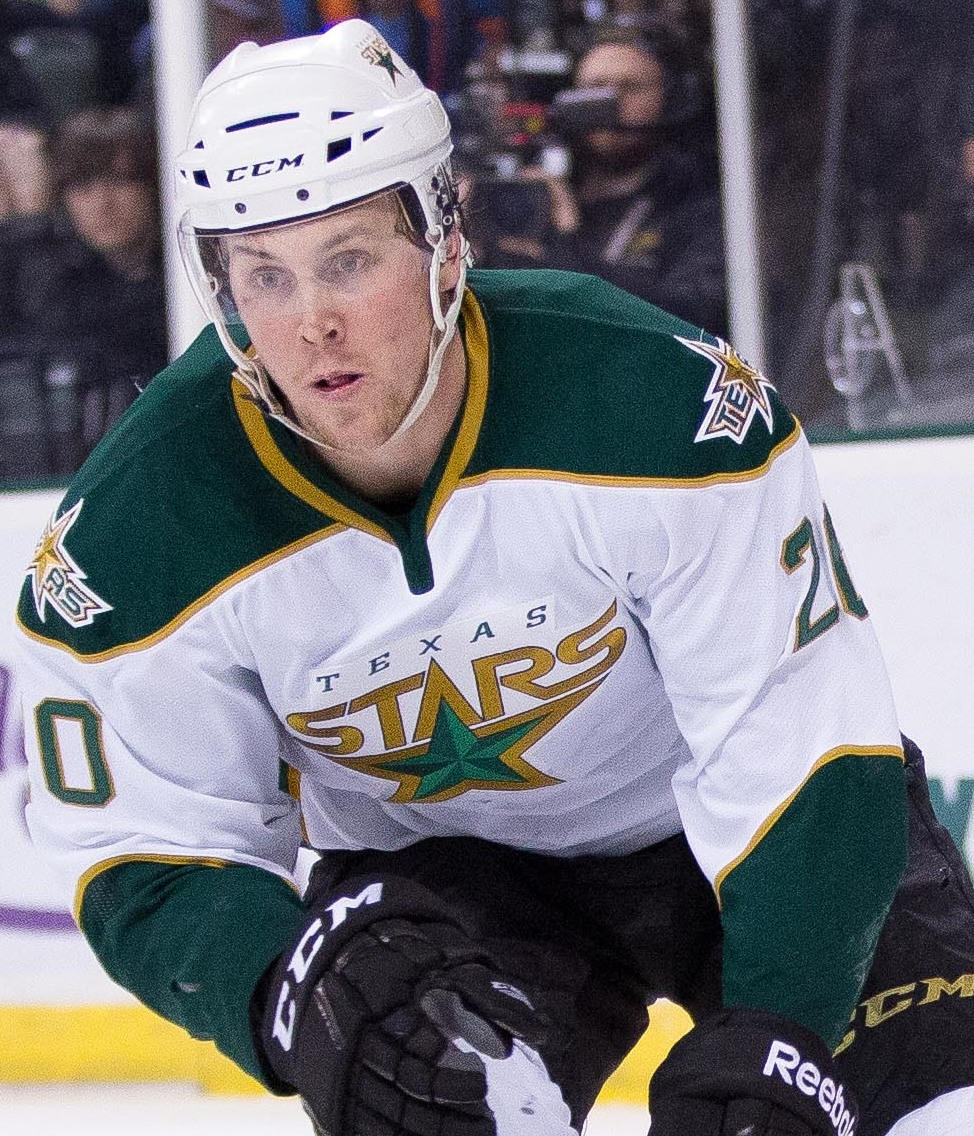
- Ritchie with the Texas Stars in 2014
- Born: July 1, 1993 (age 33) Orangeville, Ontario, Canada
- Height: 6 ft 4 in (193 cm)
- Weight: 220 lb (100 kg; 15 st 10 lb)
- Position: Right wing
- Shoots: Right
- Slovak team Former teams: Vlci Žilina; Dallas Stars; Boston Bruins; Calgary Flames; Arizona Coyotes; HC Dinamo Minsk; HK Nitra; Schwenninger Wild Wings; Villacher SV; Sheffield Steelers
- NHL draft: 44th overall, 2011; Dallas Stars
- Playing career: 2013–present

Brett Ritchie (born July 1, 1993) is a Canadian professional ice hockey forward who is currently playing for the Vlci Žilina of the Slovak Extraliga (Slovak). He has formerly played in the National Hockey League (NHL). He was selected by the Dallas Stars, 44th overall, in the 2011 NHL entry draft.

== Playing career ==
Ritchie attended The Hill Academy.

=== Junior ===
In 2009–10 Ritchie scored 13 goals and 16 assists in 65 games for the Sarnia Sting during his first season in the Ontario Hockey League (OHL). During his second season, he missed approximately a month of the season due to mononucleosis, but despite playing just 49 games, his scoring improved to 21 goals and 20 assists during the 2010–11 season. Unfortunately, due to his illness during the mid-season, Ritchie missed his opportunity to play in the 2011 CHL Top Prospects Game.

On January 5, 2012 Ritchie was traded to the Niagara Icedogs for Guelph's 2012 2nd-round pick, Peterborough's 2014 2nd-round pick, and Niagara's own 2013 2nd and 5th-round picks – all of which Sarnia immediately traded to Mississauga to acquire goalie JP Anderson.

=== Professional ===
==== Dallas Stars ====
On July 11, 2012, Ritchie signed a three-year entry-level contract with the Dallas Stars. After attending the Stars' training camp, he returned to the OHL for the 2012–13 season. At the conclusion of the 2012–13 season, Ritchie was reassigned to the Stars' American Hockey League associate, the Texas Stars, for the remainder of the 2012–13 AHL season. He made his professional debut on April 5, 2013, where he scored his first professional goal in a game against the Oklahoma City Barons. A As the Texas Stars qualified for the 2013 Calder Cup playoffs, Ritchie scored the game-winning goal of Game 1 of the Western Conference Quarterfinal against the Milwaukee Admirals on April 27, 2013.

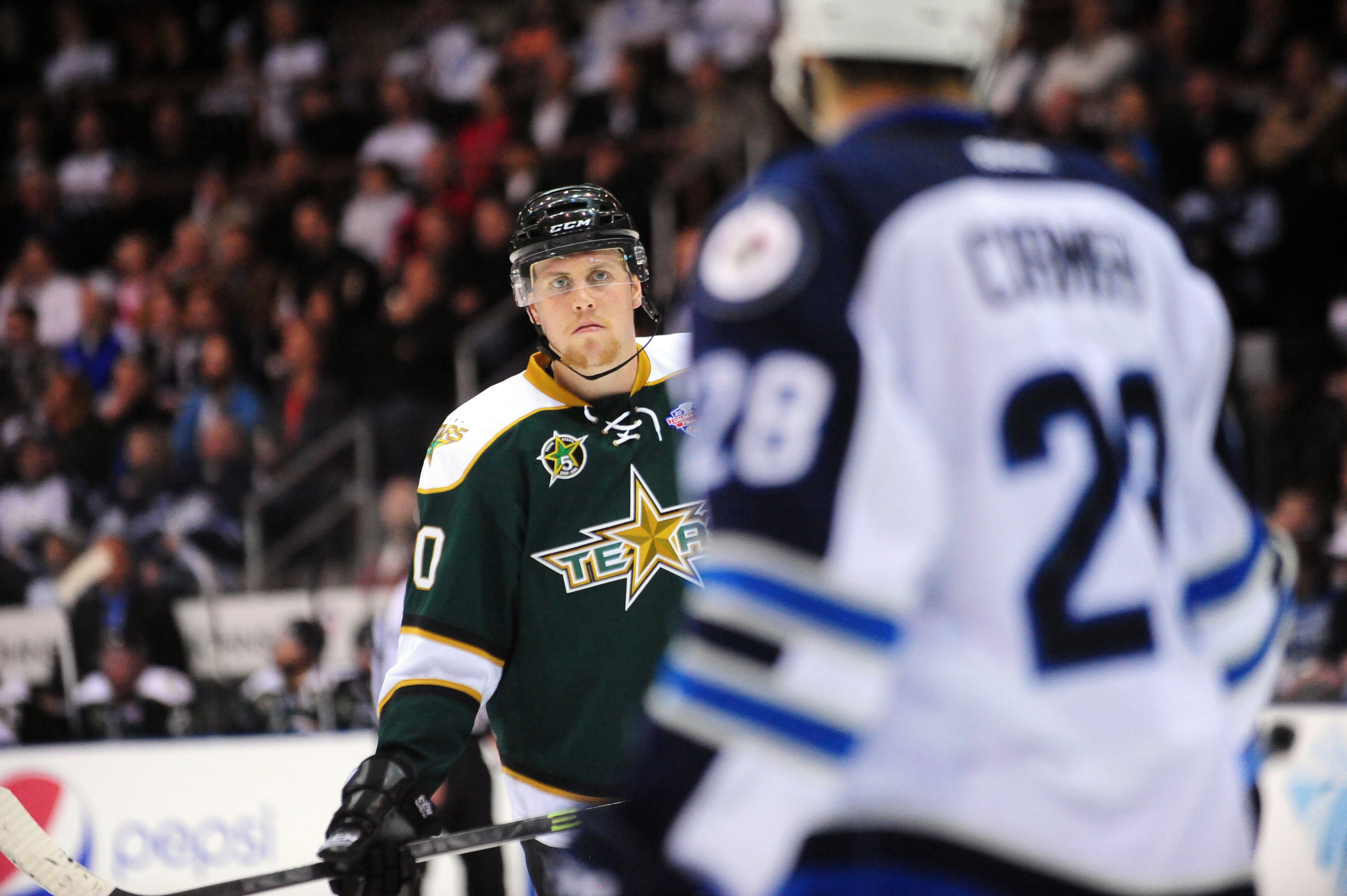
Ritchie during the 2014 Calder Cup Finals.

Ritchie joined the Dallas Stars at the NHL Prospect Tournament in Traverse City, Michigan in September 2013. He also played with the Stars in their preseason games, spending time on their second power-play unit. However, he soon suffered a lower-body injury and missed numerous preseason games to recover. Following the conclusion of the preseason, Ritchie was reassigned to the Texas Stars for the 2013–14 season. Ritchie began the season strong, tallying two goals and seven assists to tie for ninth among AHL rookies in scoring by early November. By the end of the month, he ranked seventh among rookies as he had added two more goals and four more assists for 15 points through 20 games. He began January tied for 11th in rookie scoring with 23 points through 36 games. Ritchie quickly picked up production throughout January and scored seven goals through 13 games. In early April, Ritchie set a franchise-record by scoring four goals in a 5–1 win over the Lake Erie Monsters. However, he later suffered an injury and was not expected to be ready to start the 2014 Calder Cup playoffs. He finished the regular season with 22 goals and 26 assists for 48 points through 68 games. Ritchie subsequently missed the first eight games of the playoffs before returning to the lineup for the Western Conference Semi-Finals against the Grand Rapids Griffins. In his return, he scored a goal on the power play to lift the Stars 7–1 over the Griffins and advance them to the Western Conference Finals. Despite missing numerous games, Ritchie immediately brought offensive production to the Stars lineup and quickly scored three goals in three games. Two of his goals came during Texas' 6–3 win over the Toronto Marlies to even their series to 1–1. Ritchie scored the game-winning goal in Game 7 of the Western Conference Finals to advance the Stars to the 2014 Calder Cup Finals. He scored another goal in Game 5 to lift the Stars to a 4–3 victory over the St. John's IceCaps and secure their first Calder Cup. Ritchie finished the postseason with seven goals and 11 points in 13 games in the Calder Cup Playoffs.

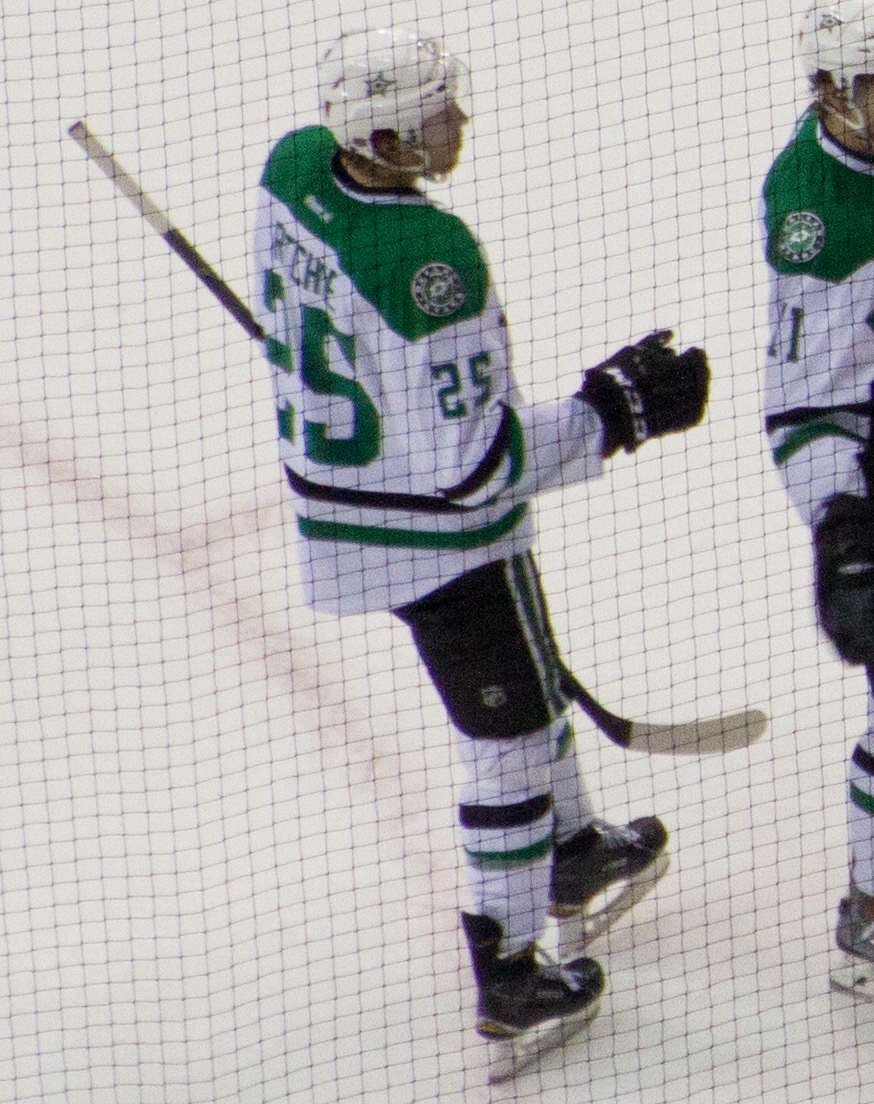
Ritchie with the Dallas Stars in 2015.

Following their Calder Cup win, Ritchie returned to the Dallas Stars' training camp and participated in his second NHL Prospect Tournament in Traverse City, Michigan. Although the Stars won their game against the Carolina Hurricanes prospects, Ritchie injured his right pinky and was expected to remain out for the remainder of the tournament as a precaution. After spending two weeks in recovery, Ritchie returned to the Stars lineup for their third exhibition game against the Tampa Bay Lightning on September 26. On October 1, Ritchie and Jyrki Jokipakka were reassigned to the AHL to start the 2014–15 season. He began his sophomore season with the Texas Stars going scoreless in his first five games despite ranking second in the AHL with 30 shots on goal. He later missed some games through November and December due to illness and injury. Upon recovering, he scored his second hat-trick with the Stars during their game against the Charlotte Checkers on December 27, 2014. Following this game, he led the team with 11 goals and tied for third on the team with 18 points. As a result of his outstanding play, he was recalled to the NHL level for the first time of the season on December 31. Ritchie subsequently scored the game-winning goal in his NHL debut as the Stars shutout the Arizona Coyotes 6–0 on January 1. He became the first Stars player to score his first NHL goal in his first NHL game since Antoine Roussel in 2013. After scoring in the following game, he also became the first Stars player to score a goal in each of his first two games since Mike Modano in 1989-90. He earned playing time on the Stars' top line with Tyler Seguin and Jamie Benn as he tallied three goals in his first six NHL games. As Seguin and Benn struggled to produce, head coach Lindy Ruff placed Ritchie on a line with Benn and Cody Eakin. However, this was short-lived as Ritchie suffered an undisclosed injury and was placed on injured reserve prior to the 2015 NHL All-Star Game break. At the time of the injury, Ritchie had tallied four points and a +8 plus/minus rating in eight NHL games. He was eventually reassigned to the Texas Stars but was recalled on February 5. He went pointless in two more games before being returned to the AHL level. However, as a result of injuries to Seguin, Patrick Eaves, and Ales Hemsky, Ritchie returned to the Dallas Stars on February 14. He was reassigned to the Texas Stars temporarily just prior to the NHL trade deadline so that he would be eligible for the AHL playoffs. Upon returning to the Dallas Stars, Ruff put Ritchie on a line with Shawn Horcoff and Curtis McKenzie, although both Ritchie and McKenzie were reassigned to the Texas Stars on March 31. He helped the Texas Stars qualify for the 2015 Calder Cup playoffs and tied for the team lead in scoring before they were eliminated by the Rockford IceHogs.

Ritchie underwent surgery to repair a ligament in his wrist during the 2015 offseason and was expected to recover within three to four months. Upon returning to the ice, he began the 2015–16 season in the AHL with the Texas Stars. He accumulated 14 goals and 28 points through 35 games before making his NHL season debut on March 4, 2016. Despite playing on the Stars' top line in his season debut, he quickly became a healthy scratch for numerous games. He later suffered another upper-body injury and missed eight games to recover. He was eventually reassigned to the AHL but returned to the Dallas Stars' lineup after the Texas Stars were eliminated from the 2016 Calder Cup playoffs. In his NHL postseason debut, Ritchie played an average of 6:36 through 11 shifts during the Stars' Game 4 win over the St. Louis Blues.

After a healthy preseason, Ritchie started the 2016–17 season on the Dallas Stars' roster. In his first full season with the Dallas Stars, he ranked fourth on the team with 16 goals and shared eighth on the club with two game-winning goals. He began the season accumulating two goals and an assist as the lineup suffered numerous injuries. During a 5–2 win over Predators on December 8, Ritchie set a new career high for goals in a season by tallying his seventh in the first period. He would later experience a 13-game goal slump which he broke in a 6–4 win over the Los Angeles Kings on January 9. Following a season-ending injury to Roussel in March, Ritchie was expected to gain a larger role on the ice and accept more responsibilities. He earned time on the Stars' second power play unit alongside forwards Jason Spezza and Devin Shore. At the conclusion of the season, the Stars extended a qualifying offer to Ritchie to retain his negotiating rights. He eventually signed a two-year, $3.5-million contract extension to remain with the team on July 6, 2017.

Ritchie began the 2017–18 season registering two points in 12 games and ranked second on the Stars with 33 hits. He was later placed on injured reserve following an injury on October 30. Ritchie returned to the Stars' lineup on November 10 after missing three games.

==== Boston Bruins ====
After seven seasons within the Stars organization, on June 25, 2019, Ritchie was not tendered a qualifying offer enabling him to become an unrestricted free agent on July 1. Marking his 26th birthday on the opening day of free agency, Ritchie was signed to a one-year, $1 million contract with the Boston Bruins. He made his season debut with the Bruins on October 3, against the Dallas Stars. He subsequently scored the first goal of the 2019–20 season to lift them to a 2–1 victory. Following the season opener, he tallied two goals and three points in 14 games before missing several more contests due to various injuries. He missed seven games to recover from an infection before returning to the Bruins lineup on November 23. However, his return was short-lived as his infection continued to flare up. He missed seven more games to recover from the infection before returning to the lineup again on December 7. He was eventually reassigned to the Bruins' AHL affiliate, the Providence Bruins on January 15 after accumulating two goals and four assists for six points through 27 games.

==== Calgary Flames and Arizona Coyotes ====
As a free agent from the Bruins, Ritchie was left unsigned entering training camp for the delayed 2020–21 season. On January 9, 2021, Ritchie was invited to join the Calgary Flames training camp on a professional tryout basis. After impressing at training camp, Ritchie signed a one-year, two-way contract with an average annual value of $700,000 with the Calgary Flames on January 17, 2021. After concluding his second season with the Flames, Ritchie was left to explore free agency before re-signing with the Flames approaching training camp to a one-year, $750,000 contract on September 22, 2022.

In the following 2022–23 season, Ritchie added six goals through 34 regular season games before he was dealt at the NHL trade deadline along with Connor Mackey to the Arizona Coyotes in exchange for his younger brother Nick Ritchie and Troy Stecher on March 3, 2023. The trade marked the first time in NHL history that brothers had been traded for each other, but the second time overall in North American professional sports, following a 2008 National Basketball Association (NBA) trade that saw Pau Gasol and Marc Gasol traded for each other.

=== Overseas ===
On November 18, 2023, Ritchie signed a one-year contract with HC Dinamo Minsk of the Kontinental Hockey League (KHL). However, his season was limited to only 12 regular-season and two playoff games.

On September 25, 2024, he signed a one-year contract with HK Nitra in the Slovak Extraliga. After recording 24 points in 28 games, which included two games against brother Nick playing for HC Nové Zámky, Ritchie was released from his contract so he could sign with the Schwenninger Wild Wings in Germany. According to Nitra club president Miroslav Kováčik, the reason for his release was that Slovak league officiating did not allow Ritchie or other skilled players to fulfill their offensive potential.

Ritchie started the 2025–26 season with Villacher SV but after playing just eight games (on a tryout) he was released on January 6th. Just a short 3 days after he was released from Villacher SV it was announced he had signed for the Sheffield Steelers. On May 14th 2026, Ritchie signed with Slovakian side Vlci Žilina.

== Early life ==
Ritchie was born on July 1, 1993, in Orangeville, Ontario, Canada to parents Paul and Tammy. Ritchie comes from an athletic family with both his parents and younger brother engaging in various sports throughout their lifetime. His mother was a three-sport athlete while attending Brock University and his father played in the Ontario Hockey League. Before his brother Nick was drafted in the 2014 NHL entry draft, they competed in lacrosse together. Brett's younger brother, Nick Ritchie, plays in the NHL for the Calgary Flames. Nick was drafted 10th overall by the Anaheim Ducks at the NHL entry draft. During the 2012–13 season, Ritchie played with Team Canada to win gold medals at both the 2012 Ivan Hlinka Memorial Tournament and the 2013 IIHF World U18 Championships.

== Career statistics ==
=== Regular season and playoffs ===
			Regular season					Playoffs
Season	Team	League	GP	G	A	Pts	PIM	GP	G	A	Pts	PIM
2009–10	Sarnia Sting	OHL	65	13	16	29	35	—	—	—	—	—
2010–11	Sarnia Sting	OHL	49	21	20	41	47	—	—	—	—	—
2011–12	Sarnia Sting	OHL	23	8	7	15	30	—	—	—	—	—
2011–12	Niagara IceDogs	OHL	30	16	14	30	24	19	3	8	11	14
2012–13	Niagara IceDogs	OHL	53	41	35	76	40	4	1	3	4	9
2012–13	Texas Stars	AHL	5	3	1	4	0	9	2	0	2	2
2013–14	Texas Stars	AHL	68	22	26	48	53	13	7	4	11	10
2014–15	Texas Stars	AHL	33	14	7	21	40	3	1	1	2	2
2014–15	Dallas Stars	NHL	31	6	3	9	12	—	—	—	—	—
2015–16	Dallas Stars	NHL	8	0	1	1	7	2	0	0	0	0
2015–16	Texas Stars	AHL	35	14	14	28	26	3	1	1	2	0
2016–17	Dallas Stars	NHL	78	16	8	24	38	—	—	—	—	—
2017–18	Dallas Stars	NHL	71	7	7	14	42	—	—	—	—	—
2018–19	Dallas Stars	NHL	53	4	2	6	57	1	0	0	0	2
2019–20	Boston Bruins	NHL	27	2	4	6	21	—	—	—	—	—
2019–20	Providence Bruins	AHL	12	2	2	4	6	—	—	—	—	—
2020–21	Calgary Flames	NHL	32	4	4	8	24	—	—	—	—	—
2021–22	Calgary Flames	NHL	41	3	1	4	29	7	2	0	2	4
2022–23	Calgary Flames	NHL	34	6	2	8	23	—	—	—	—	—
2022–23	Arizona Coyotes	NHL	16	2	3	5	2	—	—	—	—	—
2023–24	Dinamo Minsk	KHL	12	2	1	3	10	2	0	0	0	0
2024–25	HK Nitra	Slovak	28	12	12	24	22	—	—	—	—	—
2024–25	Schwenninger Wild Wings	DEL	19	6	4	10	16	3	3	1	4	4
2025–26	Villacher SV	ICEHL	8	1	2	3	4	—	—	—	—	—
2025–26	Sheffield Steelers	EIHL	24	12	10	22	4	2	0	1	1	0
NHL totals			391	50	35	85	255	10	2	0	2	6

Medal record

Representing Canada

Men's ice hockey

World U-17 Hockey Challenge
Silver medal – second place	2010 Ontario	

=== International ===
Year	Team	Event	Result	GP	G	A	Pts	PIM
2010	Canada Ontario	U17	1st place, gold medalist(s)	6	2	1	3	6
2011	Canada	U18	4th	7	4	3	7	6
2011	Canada	IH18	1st place, gold medalist(s)	5	4	0	4	2
2013	Canada	WJC	4th	6	1	3	4	2
Junior totals				24	11	7	18	16

== Awards and honours ==
Honours	Year
World U-17 Hockey Challenge silver medal	2010
Calder Cup champion	2014
