= Nick Ritchie =

Canadian ice hockey player (born 1995)

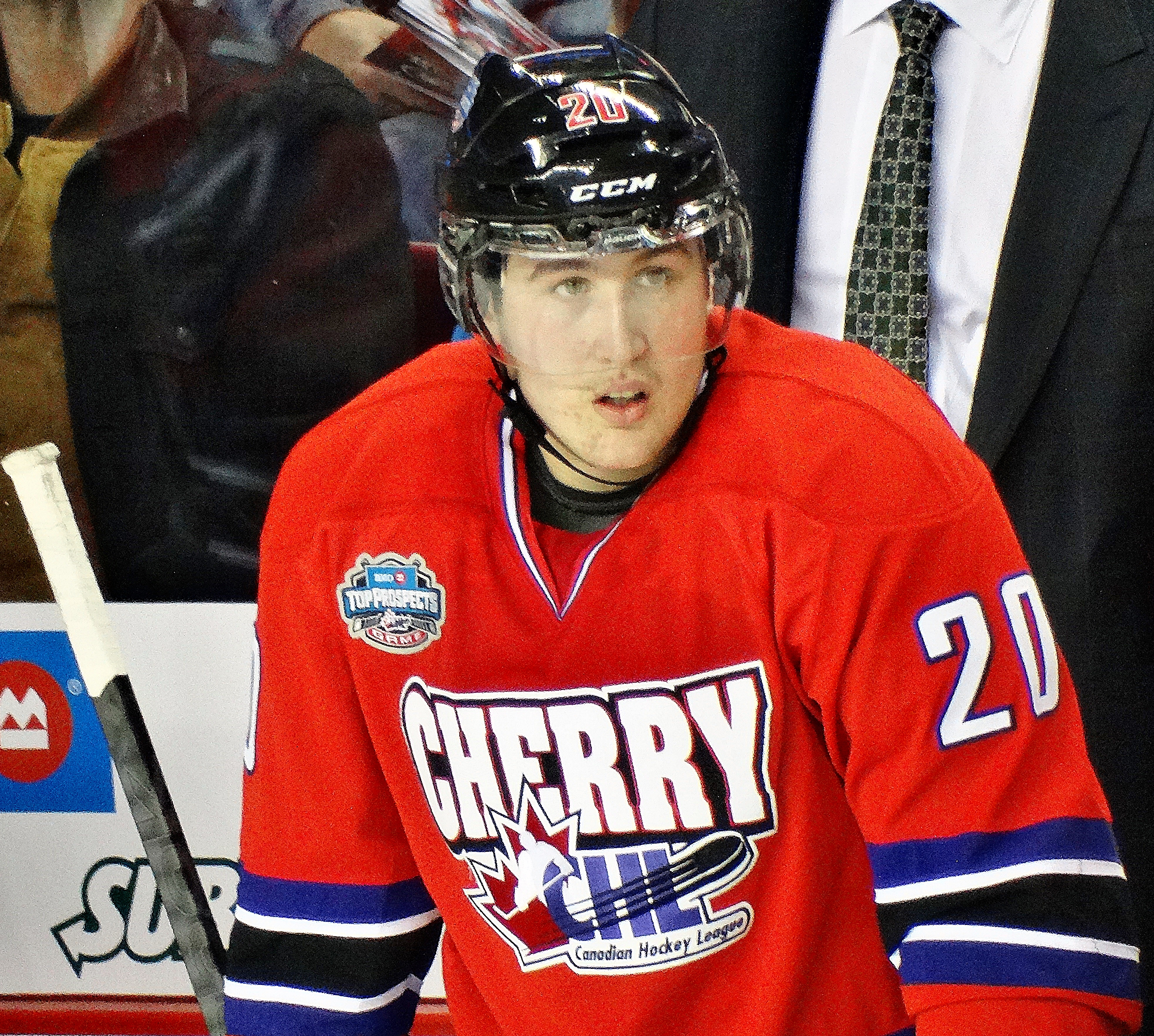
- Ritchie in 2014
- Born: December 5, 1995 (age 30) Orangeville, Ontario, Canada
- Height: 6 ft 2 in (188 cm)
- Weight: 236 lb (107 kg; 16 st 12 lb)
- Position: Left wing
- Shoots: Left
- Erste Liga team Former teams: HSC Csíkszereda; Anaheim Ducks; Boston Bruins; Toronto Maple Leafs; Arizona Coyotes; Calgary Flames; Oulun Kärpät; Iserlohn Roosters; HC Nové Zámky; HC Slovan Bratislava
- NHL draft: 10th overall, 2014; Anaheim Ducks
- Playing career: 2015–present

Nicholas Ritchie (born December 5, 1995) is a Canadian professional ice hockey forward for HSC Csíkszereda in the Erste Liga. Ritchie was selected by the Anaheim Ducks in the first round, tenth overall, of the 2014 NHL entry draft. Ritchie has also played for the Boston Bruins, Arizona Coyotes, Toronto Maple Leafs, Calgary Flames, Oulun Kärpät, the Iserlohn Roosters and HC Nové Zámky.

== Early life ==
Ritchie was born on December 5, 1995, in Orangeville, Ontario, Canada to parents Paul and Tammy. Ritchie comes from an athletic family with both his parents and older brother engaging in various sports throughout their lifetime. His mother was a three-sport athlete while attending Brock University and his father played in the Ontario Hockey League. Before his older brother Brett was drafted in the 2011 NHL entry draft, they competed in lacrosse together. As a youth, the younger Ritchie brother won three Canadian box lacrosse championships representing Team Ontario and helped the Bantam Orangeville team win an Ontario title. Growing up, Ritchie's favourite team was the Toronto Maple Leafs.

== Playing career ==
=== Early career ===
Growing up in Orangeville, Ritchie competed with the Toronto Marlboros in the Greater Toronto Hockey League (GTHL) and with the Ontario Junior Hockey League's (OJHL) Georgetown Raiders. As a 15 year old, he scored 50 goals and 45 assists in 68 games to help the Marlboros compete for the OHL Cup. During the offseason, he was named to Team Ontario at the 2011 U16 Canada Winter Games. Ritchie gave up lacrosse in the summer of 2011 to focus completely on his hockey career. He was subsequently drafted second overall by the Peterborough Petes in the 2011 Ontario Hockey League (OHL) draft. In his first major junior hockey season with the Petes, Ritchie was one of the youngest players in the entire league. He skated in 62 games during the 2011–12 season and recorded 16 goals with 23 assists.

Prior to the start of the 2013–14 season, Ritchie was named an assistant captain alongside Stephen Pierog and Nelson Armstrong. By December, Ritchie had collected 15 goals and 11 assists in 28 games and was named to the CHL/NHL Top Prospects Game. As a result of his play, Ritchie was ranked seventh amongst North American skaters by the NHL Central Scouting Bureau's mid-season list of 2014 NHL entry draft eligible players. On February 10, Ritchie was named OHL Player of the Week after he tied a franchise record by scoring five goals in one game against the Kingston Frontenacs. After the Petes were eliminated from the 2014 OHL playoffs by the Oshawa Generals, Ritchie was the recipient of the teams' Bill Bennett Award and Ed Rowe Memorial Award as the leading scorer and most goals winner.

Ritchie was drafted in the first round, tenth overall, by the Anaheim Ducks at the 2014 NHL entry draft. On August 2, 2014, the Ducks signed Ritchie to a three-year, entry-level contract. After attending the Ducks 2014–15 training camp, Ritchie was reassigned to the OHL's Peterborough Petes for his final junior season. On January 7, 2015, Ritchie was traded by the Peterborough Petes to the Sault Ste. Marie Greyhounds, along with teammate Connor Boland, in exchange for Kyle Jenkins and four draft picks.

=== Anaheim Ducks ===
After attending the Ducks 2014–15 training camp, Ritchie was reassigned to the OHL's Peterborough Petes for his final junior season. He was invited to the Ducks' 2015 training camp where he was praised by head coach Bruce Boudreau for his development. In an interview, Boudreau spoke highly of Ritchie, saying: "He feels more like a player whereas last year he was a little [raw]. He’s using his size, his speed and his strength to his advantage. It’s good for him." However, he was still re-assigned to the Ducks' American Hockey League (AHL) affiliate, the San Diego Gulls, to begin the season. After playing in 12 games, and recording 12 points, Ritchie ranked tied for third among AHL leaders in goals. As a result, he was recalled to the NHL level on November 14, 2015, alongside teammate Michael Sgarbossa. Ritchie subsequently made his NHL debut on November 16, 2015, against the Carolina Hurricanes, becoming the 11th youngest Duck to reach that milestone. He later recorded his first NHL point, an assist, on December 1, 2015, during a 4–0 win over the Vancouver Canucks. As he continued to play with the Ducks well into the new year, Ritchie recorded his first career NHL goal on March 14, 2016, in a 7–1 win over the New Jersey Devils. He later scored a tip-in goal to help the Ducks win the Pacific Division title and qualify for the 2016 Stanley Cup playoffs. However, before he could make his postseason debut, he was re-assigned to the Gulls. At the time of his reassigned, Ritchie had amassed four points in 33 games for the Ducks during the regular season.

The following season, Ritchie made his the Ducks' home opening night roster against the Dallas Stars on October 13, 2016, where they fell 4-2. He spent the majority of the season playing on a line alongside center Antoine Vermette and right wing Corey Perry and ranked eighth in the NHL in hits by April. On April 6, Ritchie was suspended two games for roughing Chicago Blackhawks defenceman Michal Rozsíval, and had to miss the last game of the regular season against the Los Angeles Kings. He returned to the lineup for the Ducks' first round playoff series against the Calgary Flames. He scored in his second game back to spark a comeback in Game 3 of the Western Conference First Round sweep of the Calgary Flames. After sweeping the Flames in four games, the Ducks entered the second round against the Edmonton Oilers. After committing a penalty during Game 1 of the series, Ritchie was scratched for Game 2 and had decreased ice time during Game 3. However, Ritchie scored the game winning goal in Game 7 to send the Ducks to the 2017 Western Conference Finals against the Nashville Predators. During the series, Ritchie was ejected from Game 6 for boarding Predators forward Viktor Arvidsson. The Ducks ended up being eliminated that game and the Predators went on to the 2017 Stanley Cup Finals.

On October 19, 2018, the Ducks signed Ritchie to a three-year, $4.6 million contract, ending his holdout. Ritchie missed the team's first seven games of the season.

=== Boston Bruins ===
On February 24, 2020, Ritchie was dealt at the trade deadline to the Boston Bruins in exchange for Danton Heinen. At the time of the trade, he had recorded eight goals and 11 assists for 19 points in 41 games. Ritchie only played in seven games, where he recorded one goal and an assist, before the league paused due to the COVID-19 pandemic.

In the following pandemic-shortened 2020–21 season, Ritchie played his 300th career NHL game on January 26, 2021, against the Pittsburgh Penguins. In a rebound season with the Bruins, he appeared in every game with the Bruins, collecting 15 goals and 26 points in 56 contests. He added 4 points in 11 playoff games before he was surprisingly released as a free agent by the Bruins after he was not tendered a qualifying offer as an impending restricted free agent.

=== Toronto Maple Leafs ===
On July 31, 2021, Ritchie was signed to a two-year, $5 million contract with his childhood team, the Toronto Maple Leafs. Ritchie was primarily signed to replace Zach Hyman's role, who the Leafs lost to the Edmonton Oilers during the same free agency period, and was expected to serve as a gritty, aggressive winger on the top line alongside Auston Matthews. However, Ritchie struggled in his time with Toronto, failing to contribute offensively and not being able to keep up with the speed of his linemates; after starting the season in his expected role on the top line, Ritchie was gradually demoted until finally being placed on waivers on January 6, 2022. He cleared waivers the following day and was assigned to the Toronto Maple Leafs' taxi squad. After the NHL eliminated the taxi squad following the NHL All Star break, Ritchie was assigned to the Toronto Marlies, for which he appeared in two contests for, scoring one goal. Following waiving Ritchie, the team began to explore trade opportunities to give him another opportunity at playing in the NHL and to alleviate his burdensome cap hit.

=== Arizona Coyotes ===
On February 19, 2022, Ritchie was traded to the Arizona Coyotes along with a third-round pick in 2023 or a second-round pick in 2025 in exchange for Ryan Dzingel and Ilya Lyubushkin.

During the 2022–23 season, having re-established himself in the league through his tenure with the Coyotes, he posted 21 points through 58 games.

=== Calgary Flames ===
On March 3, 2023, Ritchie was dealt at the NHL trade deadline by the Coyotes, alongside Troy Stecher to the Calgary Flames in exchange for his older brother Brett Ritchie and Connor Mackey. It marked the first time in NHL history that brothers were traded directly for each other, but the second time overall in North American professional sports, following a 2008 National Basketball Association (NBA) trade that saw Pau Gasol and Marc Gasol traded for each other. Nick scored his first goal in his debut game with the Calgary Flames against the Dallas Stars on March 6.

During the 2023–24 preseason, Ritchie signed a professional tryout offer with the St. Louis Blues on September 14, but was released on September 29.

=== Oulun Kärpät ===
On November 25, 2023, Ritchie signed a one-year contract with SM-liiga club Oulun Kärpät. On December 29, Ritchie was handed an eight-game suspension after he had punched HC TPS player Markus Nurmi to the head multiple times while he was lying on the ice. On January 29, 2024, Kärpät announced that they had terminated Ritchie's contract.

=== Iserlohn Roosters ===
On January 29, 2024, the Iserlohn Roosters of the Deutsche Eishockey Liga (DEL) announced that they had signed Ritchie.

=== Slovak Extraliga ===
On October 24, 2024, Ritchie signed with HC Nové Zámky of the Slovak Extraliga. While there, he played two games against his brother, Brett, who played for HK Nitra. After recording 24 points in 19 games for Nové Zámky, Ritchie transferred within the league to HC Slovan Bratislava on January 31, 2025.

=== Erste Liga ===
On December 11, 2025, Ritchie signed with HSC Csíkszereda of the Erste Liga for the remainder of the season.

== International career ==
During the 2012–13 season, Ritchie played with the Canada men's national under-18 ice hockey team to win gold medals at both the 2012 Ivan Hlinka Memorial Tournament and the 2013 IIHF World U18 Championships. He was later named to the Canadian men's national junior ice hockey team for the 2015 World Junior Ice Hockey Championships.

== Career statistics ==
=== Regular season and playoffs ===
| | | | Regular season | | | | | Playoffs |
| Season | Team | League | GP | G | A | Pts | PIM | GP | G | A | Pts | PIM |
|---|---|---|---|---|---|---|---|---|---|---|---|---|
| 2010–11 | Georgetown Raiders | OJHL | 1 | 0 | 0 | 0 | 0 | — | — | — | — | — |
| 2011–12 | Peterborough Petes | OHL | 62 | 16 | 23 | 39 | 60 | — | — | — | — | — |
| 2012–13 | Peterborough Petes | OHL | 41 | 18 | 17 | 35 | 50 | — | — | — | — | — |
| 2013–14 | Peterborough Petes | OHL | 61 | 39 | 35 | 74 | 136 | 11 | 5 | 5 | 10 | 24 |
| 2014–15 | Peterborough Petes | OHL | 25 | 14 | 18 | 32 | 69 | — | — | — | — | — |
| 2014–15 | Sault Ste. Marie Greyhounds | OHL | 23 | 15 | 15 | 30 | 44 | 14 | 13 | 13 | 26 | 28 |
| 2015–16 | San Diego Gulls | AHL | 38 | 16 | 14 | 30 | 59 | 9 | 5 | 3 | 8 | 20 |
| 2015–16 | Anaheim Ducks | NHL | 33 | 2 | 2 | 4 | 37 | — | — | — | — | — |
| 2016–17 | Anaheim Ducks | NHL | 77 | 14 | 14 | 28 | 62 | 15 | 4 | 0 | 4 | 46 |
| 2017–18 | Anaheim Ducks | NHL | 76 | 10 | 17 | 27 | 72 | 4 | 0 | 0 | 0 | 8 |
| 2018–19 | Anaheim Ducks | NHL | 60 | 9 | 22 | 31 | 82 | — | — | — | — | — |
| 2019–20 | Anaheim Ducks | NHL | 41 | 8 | 11 | 19 | 78 | — | — | — | — | — |
| 2019–20 | Boston Bruins | NHL | 7 | 1 | 1 | 2 | 19 | 8 | 1 | 0 | 1 | 16 |
| 2020–21 | Boston Bruins | NHL | 56 | 15 | 11 | 26 | 37 | 11 | 1 | 3 | 4 | 10 |
| 2021–22 | Toronto Maple Leafs | NHL | 33 | 2 | 7 | 9 | 23 | — | — | — | — | — |
| 2021–22 | Toronto Marlies | AHL | 2 | 1 | 0 | 1 | 0 | — | — | — | — | — |
| 2021–22 | Arizona Coyotes | NHL | 24 | 10 | 4 | 14 | 20 | — | — | — | — | — |
| 2022–23 | Arizona Coyotes | NHL | 58 | 9 | 12 | 21 | 43 | — | — | — | — | — |
| 2022–23 | Calgary Flames | NHL | 16 | 4 | 1 | 5 | 10 | — | — | — | — | — |
| 2023–24 | Oulun Kärpät | Liiga | 10 | 1 | 4 | 5 | 70 | — | — | — | — | — |
| 2023–24 | Iserlohn Roosters | DEL | 8 | 1 | 1 | 2 | 8 | — | — | — | — | — |
| 2024–25 | HC Nové Zámky | Slovak | 19 | 11 | 13 | 24 | 100 | — | — | — | — | — |
| 2024–25 | HC Slovan Bratislava | Slovak | 8 | 1 | 4 | 5 | 14 | 3 | 1 | 2 | 3 | 6 |
| 2025–26 | HSC Csíkszereda | Erste | 9 | 5 | 11 | 16 | 14 | 3 | 3 | 2 | 5 | 2 |
| NHL totals | | | 481 | 84 | 102 | 186 | 483 | 38 | 6 | 3 | 9 | 80 |

Medal record

Ice hockey

Representing Canada

World Junior Championships
| Gold medal – first place | 2015 Canada | |

IIHF World U18 Championship
| Gold medal – first place | 2013 Russia | |

Ivan Hlinka Memorial Tournament
| Gold medal – first place | 2012 Piešťany | |

Representing Canada Ontario

World U-17 Hockey Challenge
| Bronze medal – third place | 2012 Windsor | |

=== International ===
| Year | Team | Event | Result | GP | G | A | Pts | PIM |
|---|---|---|---|---|---|---|---|---|
| 2012 | Canada Ontario | U17 | 3rd place, bronze medalist(s) | 3 | 1 | 2 | 3 | 2 |
| 2012 | Canada | IH18 | 1st place, gold medalist(s) | 5 | 1 | 1 | 2 | 31 |
| 2013 | Canada | U18 | 1st place, gold medalist(s) | 4 | 1 | 3 | 4 | 10 |
| 2015 | Canada | WJC | 1st place, gold medalist(s) | 7 | 1 | 0 | 1 | 6 |
| Junior totals | | | | 19 | 4 | 6 | 10 | 49 |

== Awards and honours ==
| Award | Year | Ref |
OHL
| All-Rookie First Team | 2011–12 | |
International
| Ivan Hlinka Memorial Tournament gold medal | 2012 | |
| IIHF World U18 Championships gold medal | 2013 | |
| IIHF World U20 Championships gold medal | 2015 | |

Awards and achievements
| Preceded by Shea Theodore | Anaheim Ducks first-round draft pick 2014 | Succeeded by Jacob Larsson |
