= Connor Mackey =

American ice hockey player (born 1996)

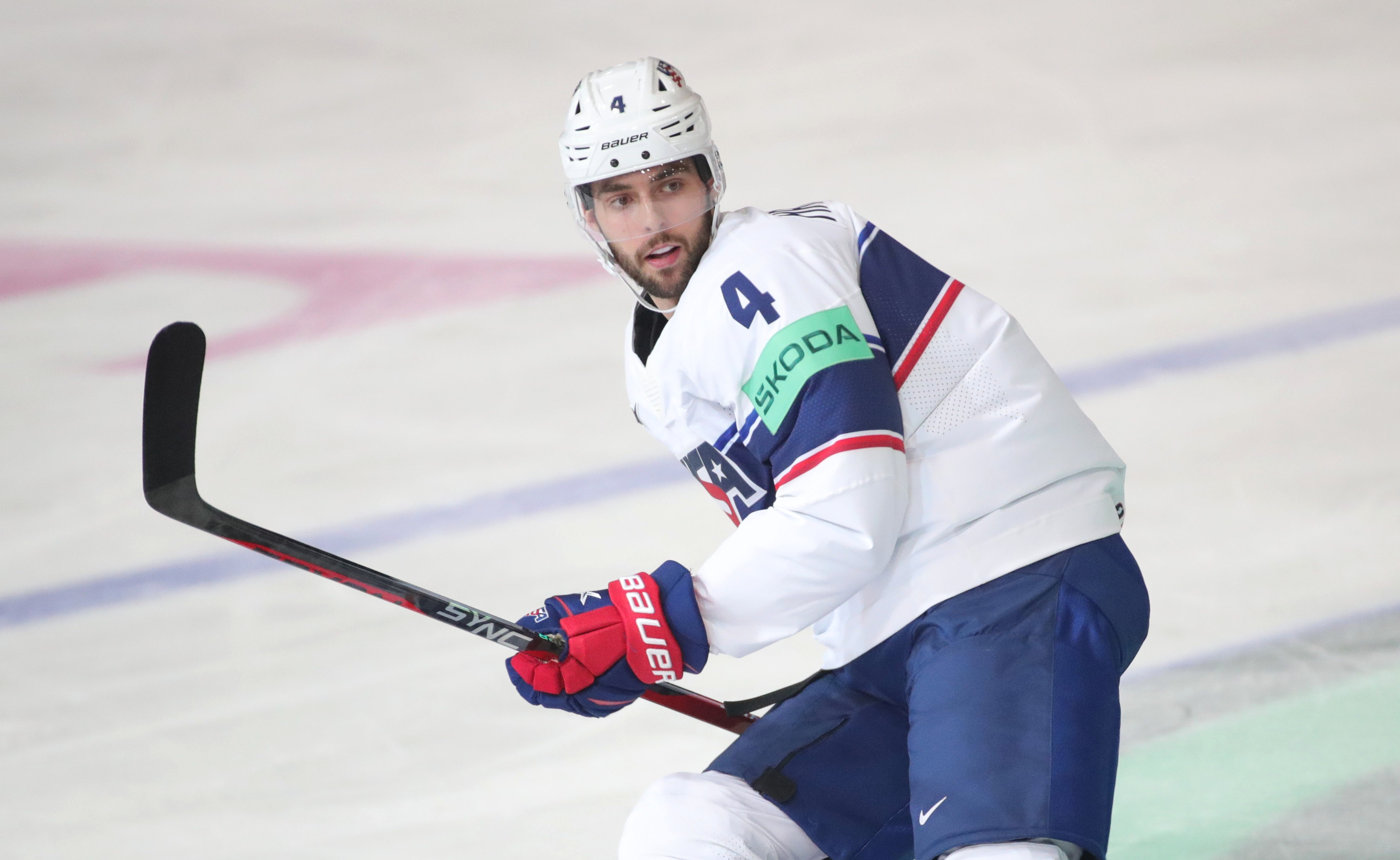
- Mackey with the United States in 2023
- Born: September 12, 1996 (age 30) Tower Lakes, Illinois, U.S.
- Height: 6 ft 2 in (188 cm)
- Weight: 200 lb (91 kg; 14 st 4 lb)
- Position: Defense
- Shoots: Left
- NHL team (P) Cur. team Former teams: Chicago Blackhawks; Rockford IceHogs (AHL); Calgary Flames; Arizona Coyotes; New York Rangers
- National team: United States
- NHL draft: Undrafted
- Playing career: 2021–present

Connor Mackey (born September 12, 1996) is an American professional ice hockey player who is a defenseman for the Rockford IceHogs of the American Hockey League (AHL) while under contract to the Chicago Blackhawks of the National Hockey League (NHL). Mackey became highly coveted as an undrafted free agent after playing three years of college ice hockey for Minnesota State University, ultimately signing with the Calgary Flames in March 2020. He is the son of former NHL player David Mackey, who played for the Blackhawks, Minnesota North Stars, and St. Louis Blues.

== Playing career ==
=== Amateur ===
After playing two years of hockey at Barrington High School near his hometown of Tower Lakes, Illinois between 2012 and 2014, serving as team captain in his final year, Mackey spent the 2014–15 hockey season as a member of the triple-A level U18 Team Illinois in the High-Performance Hockey League (HPHL).

Mackey began playing for the Green Bay Gamblers of the United States Hockey League (USHL) in 2015–16. He was named an alternate captain in 2016–17 and emerged as an offensive engine on a Gamblers squad that also featured future NHL first-round pick Casey Mittelstadt. Mackey led the team with 47 points in 60 games and was named USHL Defenseman of the Year and to the USHL First All-Star Team. He was recruited to join the Minnesota State Mavericks men's ice hockey team to begin the 2017–18 season.

Prior to the start of his college career, Mackey was invited to and attended the Calgary Flames' 2017 summer prospect development camp as an undrafted free agent. Beginning that fall, Mackey enjoyed a successful debut season with the Mavericks which saw him earn a spot on the 2017–18 Western Collegiate Hockey Association (WCHA) All-Rookie Team. In the summer of 2018, Mackey again attended an NHL prospect convention: this time, he was invited to the Buffalo Sabres' annual development camp. He followed it up with a 2018–19 season during which he was named a WCHA All-Academic and to the All-WCHA Third All-Star Team.

In 2019–20, Mackey, unaffiliated with any professional club after going undrafted, emerged as a top prospect and attracted interest from 28 of the NHL's 31 teams. He led Mavericks defensemen with 24 points in 36 games en route to being named to the All-WCHA First All-Star Team and the American Hockey Coaches Association's All-America West Second Team. Mackey's performance in 2019–20 led TSN's Frank Seravalli to name him the top-ranked college free-agent on the market.

=== Professional ===
On March 20, 2020, Mackey signed a one-year, entry-level contract with the Calgary Flames to take effect at the start of the 2020–21 NHL season. Despite his contract not taking effect until the following season, Mackey joined the Flames for practices in the Edmonton bubble as part of the return-to-play program in the 2020 Stanley Cup playoffs. Mackey made his NHL debut on February 13, 2021.

During the 2022–23 season, Mackey remained on the Flames roster, primarily serving as a depth defenseman and healthy scratch. After 10 appearances with the Flames, Mackey was dealt at the NHL trade deadline along with Brett Ritchie to the Arizona Coyotes in exchange for Nick Ritchie and Troy Stecher on March 3, 2023.

Following his brief tenure with the Coyotes, Mackey was signed as a free agent in the off-season to a one-year, two-way contract by the New York Rangers on July 1, 2023. On March 1, 2024, he signed a two-year contract extension with the Rangers.

After three seasons within the Rangers organization, Mackey left as a free agent and was signed to a two-year, two-way contract with the Chicago Blackhawks on July 1, 2026.

== Career statistics ==
=== Regular season and playoffs ===
			Regular season					Playoffs
Season	Team	League	GP	G	A	Pts	PIM	GP	G	A	Pts	PIM
2015–16	Green Bay Gamblers	USHL	29	1	1	2	62	2	0	0	0	2
2016–17	Green Bay Gamblers	USHL	60	6	41	47	93	—	—	—	—	—
2017–18	Minnesota State	WCHA	40	4	8	12	40	—	—	—	—	—
2018–19	Minnesota State	WCHA	42	7	18	25	55	—	—	—	—	—
2019–20	Minnesota State	WCHA	36	7	17	24	29	—	—	—	—	—
2020–21	Calgary Flames	NHL	6	1	2	3	20	—	—	—	—	—
2020–21	Stockton Heat	AHL	27	3	13	16	33	—	—	—	—	—
2021–22	Stockton Heat	AHL	53	5	31	36	83	7	1	3	4	4
2021–22	Calgary Flames	NHL	3	0	1	1	2	—	—	—	—	—
2022–23	Calgary Flames	NHL	10	2	1	3	9	—	—	—	—	—
2022–23	Arizona Coyotes	NHL	20	1	3	4	39	—	—	—	—	—
2023–24	Hartford Wolf Pack	AHL	44	2	9	11	12	—	—	—	—	—
2023–24	New York Rangers	NHL	1	0	0	0	5	—	—	—	—	—
2024–25	Hartford Wolf Pack	AHL	66	6	18	24	102	—	—	—	—	—
2024–25	New York Rangers	NHL	2	0	0	0	5	—	—	—	—	—
2025–26	Hartford Wolf Pack	AHL	62	5	13	18	87	—	—	—	—	—
2025–26	New York Rangers	NHL	3	0	0	0	4	—	—	—	—	—
NHL totals			45	4	7	11	84	—	—	—	—	—

=== International ===
Medal record

Men's ice hockey

Representing the United States

World Championships
Bronze medal – third place	2021 Latvia	

Year	Team	Event	Result	GP	G	A	Pts	PIM
2021	United States	WC	3rd place, bronze medalist(s)	7	0	1	1	2
2023	United States	WC	4th	10	1	2	3	8
Senior totals				17	1	3	4	10

== Awards and honors ==
Award	Year	Ref
USHL
Defenseman of the Year	2017	
First All-Star Team	2017	
College
WCHA All-Rookie Team	2018	
WCHA Third All-Star Team	2019	
WCHA First All-Star Team	2020	
