= Rockford IceHogs =

American Hockey League team in Rockford, Illinois

- City: Rockford, Illinois
- League: American Hockey League
- Conference: Western
- Division: Central
- Founded: 1995
- Operated: 2007–present
- Home arena: BMO Center
- Colors: Red, black, white
- Mascot: Hamilton E. Hog
- Owner: Wirtz Corporation
- General manager: Mark Bernard (de facto)
- Head coach: Jared Nightingale
- Captain: Brett Seney
- Media: WIFR 19.2 (Antenna TV); SportsFan 1330; AHL.TV (Internet)
- Affiliates: Chicago Blackhawks (NHL); Indy Fuel (ECHL)
- Website: IceHogs.com

Franchise history
- 1995–1997: Baltimore Bandits
- 1997–2005: Cincinnati Mighty Ducks
- 2007–present: Rockford IceHogs

The Rockford IceHogs are a professional ice hockey team based in Rockford, Illinois. They are members of the American Hockey League (AHL), having begun play in the League starting in the 2007–08 season. The team plays their home games at the BMO Center, and they serve as the top minor league affiliate of the National Hockey League (NHL)'s Chicago Blackhawks.

== History ==
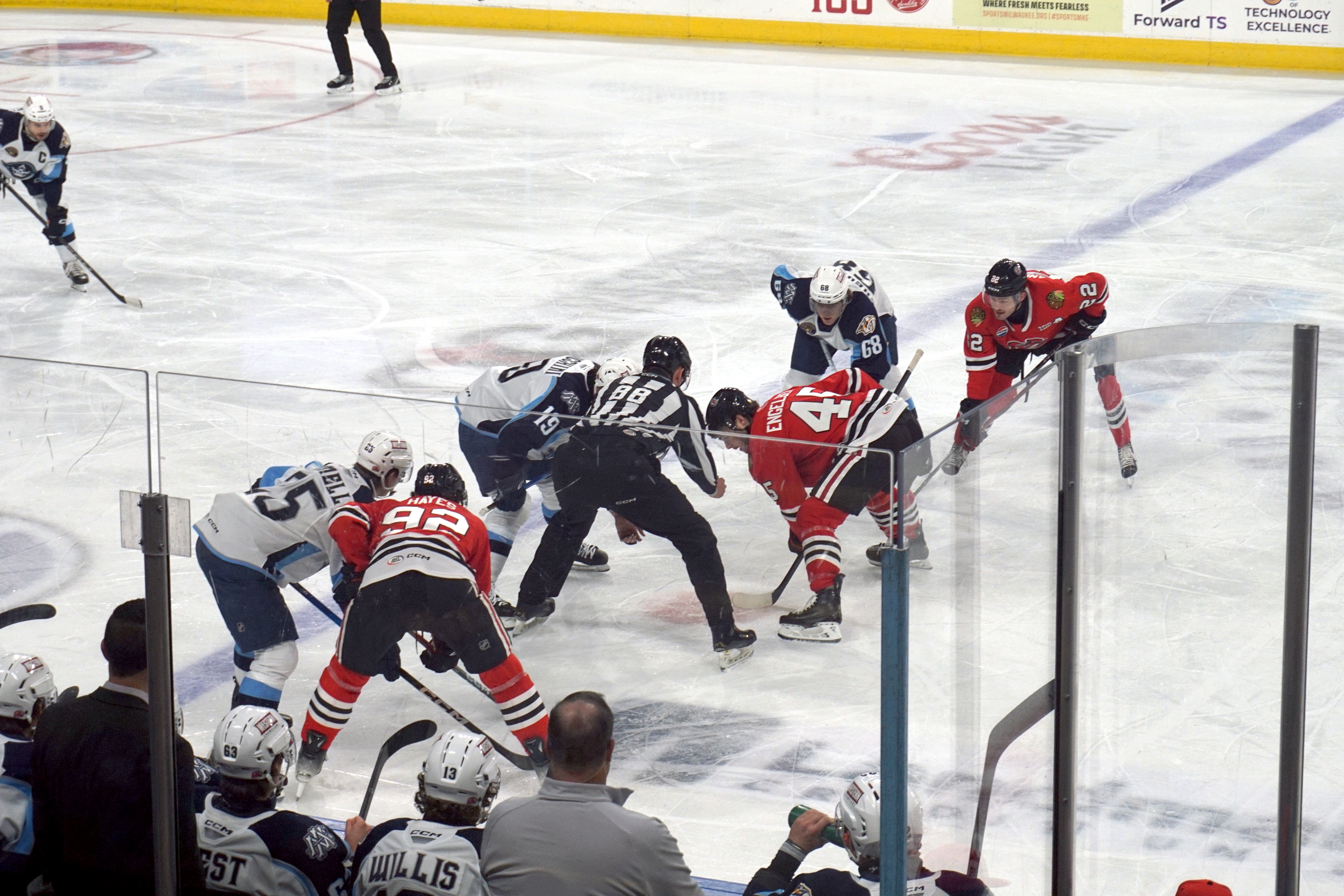
Rockford in action against the Milwaukee Admirals in 2025

The current Rockford IceHogs were founded in 1995 as the Baltimore Bandits and then relocated in 1997 to Cincinnati to become the Cincinnati Mighty Ducks. The Cincinnati Mighty Ducks suspended operations for the 2005–06 season due to the lack of an NHL affiliate after their previous affiliates, the Detroit Red Wings and the Mighty Ducks of Anaheim, signed new agreements with the Grand Rapids Griffins and the Portland Pirates, respectively. The franchise was later renamed the Cincinnati RailRaiders, but failed to reach a goal of 2,000 season tickets to re-enter the AHL for the 2006–07 season. On March 19, 2007, the AHL announced that the team had been purchased and relocated to Rockford to become the present-day Rockford IceHogs.

On April 7, 2021, the Blackhawks formally purchased the IceHogs. The Blackhawks also unveiled a $23 million multi-year project to renovate and modernize the BMO Harris Bank Center, which would keep the IceHogs in Rockford through 2036.

== Timeline ==
The franchise was previously known as:

- Baltimore Bandits (1995–1997)
- Cincinnati Mighty Ducks (1997–2005) (an affiliate of the Mighty Ducks of Anaheim and Detroit Red Wings)

The market was previously served by:

- Rockford IceHogs (1999–2007) UHL

== Season-by-season results ==
Rockford IceHogs season results
Regular season											Playoffs					
Season	Games	Won	Lost	OTL	SOL	Points	PCT	Goals for	Goals against	Standing	Year	Prelims	1st round	2nd round	3rd round	Finals
2007–08	80	44	26	4	6	98	.613	247	231	2nd, West	2008	—	W, 4–1, HOU	L, 3–4, CHI	—	—
2008–09	80	40	34	0	6	86	.538	229	220	4th, West	2009	—	L, 0–4, MIL	—	—	—
2009–10	80	44	30	3	3	94	.588	226	226	3rd, West	2010	—	L, 0–4, TEX	—	—	—
2010–11	80	38	33	4	5	85	.531	216	245	8th, West	2011	Did not qualify				
2011–12	76	35	32	2	7	79	.520	207	228	5th, Midwest	2012	Did not qualify				
2012–13	76	42	31	2	1	87	.572	246	225	3rd, Midwest	2013	Did not qualify				
2013–14	76	35	32	5	4	79	.520	234	262	4th, Midwest	2014	Did not qualify				
2014–15	76	46	23	5	2	99	.651	222	180	2nd, Midwest	2015	—	W, 3–0, TEX	L, 1–4. GR	—	—
2015–16	76	40	22	10	4	94	.618	214	205	3rd, Central	2016	—	L, 0–3, LE	—	—	—
2016–17	76	25	39	9	3	62	.408	175	246	8th, Central	2017	Did not qualify				
2017–18	76	40	28	4	4	88	.579	239	234	4th, Central	2018	—	W, 3–0, CHI	W, 4–0, MB	L, 2–4, TEX	—
2018–19	76	35	31	4	6	80	.526	184	214	7th, Central	2019	Did not qualify				
2019–20	63	29	30	2	2	62	.492	156	187	5th, Central	2020	Season cancelled due to the COVID-19 pandemic				
2020–21	32	12	19	1	0	25	.391	89	115	6th, Central	2021	No playoffs were held				
2021–22	72	37	30	4	1	79	.549	223	221	4th, Central	2022	W, 2–0, TEX	L, 0–3, CHI	—	—	—
2022–23	72	35	28	5	4	79	.549	214	232	5th, Central	2023	W, 2–0, IA	L, 0–3, TEX	—	—	—
2023–24	72	39	26	5	2	85	.590	215	208	3rd, Central	2024	BYE	L, 1–3, GR	—	—	—
2024–25	72	31	33	6	2	70	.486	206	220	5th, Central	2025	W, 2–0, CHI	L, 2–3, MIL	—	—	—
2025–26	72	28	39	3	2	61	.424	196	245	7th, Central	2026	Did not qualify				

== Players ==
=== Current roster ===
Updated November 22, 2026.

No.	Nat	Player	Pos	S/G	Age	Acquired	Birthplace	Contract
42	(Canada)	Dylan Anhorn	D	L	27	2026	Calgary, Alberta	Blackhawks
31	(Russia)	Stanislav Berezhnoy	G	L	23	2025	Novokuznetsk, Russia	Blackhawks
90	(Canada)	Sacha Boisvert	C	L	20	2026	Trois-Rivières, Quebec	Blackhawks
36	(Canada)	Dillon Boucher	LW	L	29	2025	Head of Chezzetcook, Nova Scotia	Blackhawks
57	(Canada)	Ashton Cumby	D	L	21	2026	Bonnyville, Alberta	Blackhawks
45	(Canada)	Jamie Engelbert	C	L	26	2025	Cobourg, Ontario	IceHogs
75	(Czech Republic)	Jiri Felcman	C	L	21	2026	Hradec Kralove, Czech Republic	Blackhawks
23	(United States)	Cavan Fitzgerald (A)	D	L	30	2024	Boston, Massachusetts	IceHogs
53	(Canada)	Jake Furlong	D	L	22	2026	Labrador City, Newfoundland	Blackhawks
47	(Canada)	Taige Harding	D	L	24	2025	Glasgow, Scotland	Blackhawks
92	(United States)	Gavin Hayes	LW	R	22	2024	Ypsilanti, Michigan	Blackhawks
93	(Canada)	Brayden Hislop	D	L	23	2026	St. Clements, Ontario	IceHogs
76	(Canada)	Nick Lardis	LW	L	21	2026	Oakville, Ontario	Blackhawks
96	(Canada)	Paul Ludwinski	C	L	22	2024	Toronto, Ontario	Blackhawks
15	(United States)	Connor Mackey (A)	D	L	30	2026	Tower Lakes, Illinois	Blackhawks
40	(Canada)	Spencer Martin	G	L	31	2026	Oakville, Ontario	Blackhawks
68	(Slovakia)	Martin Misiak	LW	L	22	2024	Banská Bystrica, Slovakia	Blackhawks
46	(Canada)	Connor Mylymok	LW	L	26	2025	Jackson, Missouri	Blackhawks
51	(Canada)	Derrick Pouliot (A)	D	L	32	2026	Estevan, Saskatchewan	Blackhawks
67	(Canada)	Samuel Savoie	LW	L	22	2024	Dieppe, New Brunswick	Blackhawks
62	(Canada)	Brett Seney (C)	C	L	30	2022	London, Ontario	IceHogs
84	(United States)	Landon Slaggert (A)	LW	L	24	2024	South Bend, Indiana	Blackhawks
79	(United States)	A. J. Spellacy	RW	R	20	2026	Westlake, Ohio	Blackhawks
83	(Canada)	Marek Vanacker	LW	L	20	2026	London, Ontario	Blackhawks

=== Team captains ===
- Jim Fahey, 2007–2008
- Tim Brent, 2008–2009
- Jake Dowell, 2009–2010
- Garnet Exelby, 2010–2011
- Brandon Segal and Brian Fahey, 2011–2012
- Martin St. Pierre, 2012–2013
- Jared Nightingale, 2013–2014
- Joakim Nordstrom, 2014–2015
- Brandon Mashinter, 2015–2016
- Jake Dowell, 2016–2017
- Kris Versteeg, 2019
- Tyler Sikura, 2019–2020
- Garrett Mitchell, 2021–2023
- Brett Seney, 2024–present

=== American Hockey League Hall of Famers ===
AHL Hall of Fame Honored Members
Name	Seasons	Induction Year
Michael Leighton	2014-16 (player)	2025

=== Notable alumni ===
- Bryan Bickell, 2007–2010, 2015–2016
- Dave Bolland, 2007–2008
- Brandon Bollig, 2010–2013
- Troy Brouwer, 2007–2009
- Corey Crawford, 2007–2010
- Phillip Danault, 2011–2016
- Scott Darling, 2014–2015
- Niklas Hjalmarsson, 2007–2009
- Carter Hutton, 2011–2013
- Marcus Kruger, 2012–2013
- Nick Leddy, 2010–2011, 2012–2013
- Jeremy Morin, 2010–2014
- Antti Niemi, 2008–2009
- Brandon Pirri, 2010–2014
- Brandon Saad, 2012–2013
- Andrew Shaw, 2011–2013
- Jack Skille, 2008–2010
- Ben Smith, 2009–2013
- Trevor van Riemsdyk, 2014–2015
- Kris Versteeg, 2007–2008, 2019
