= Brett Seney =

Canadian ice hockey player (born 1996)

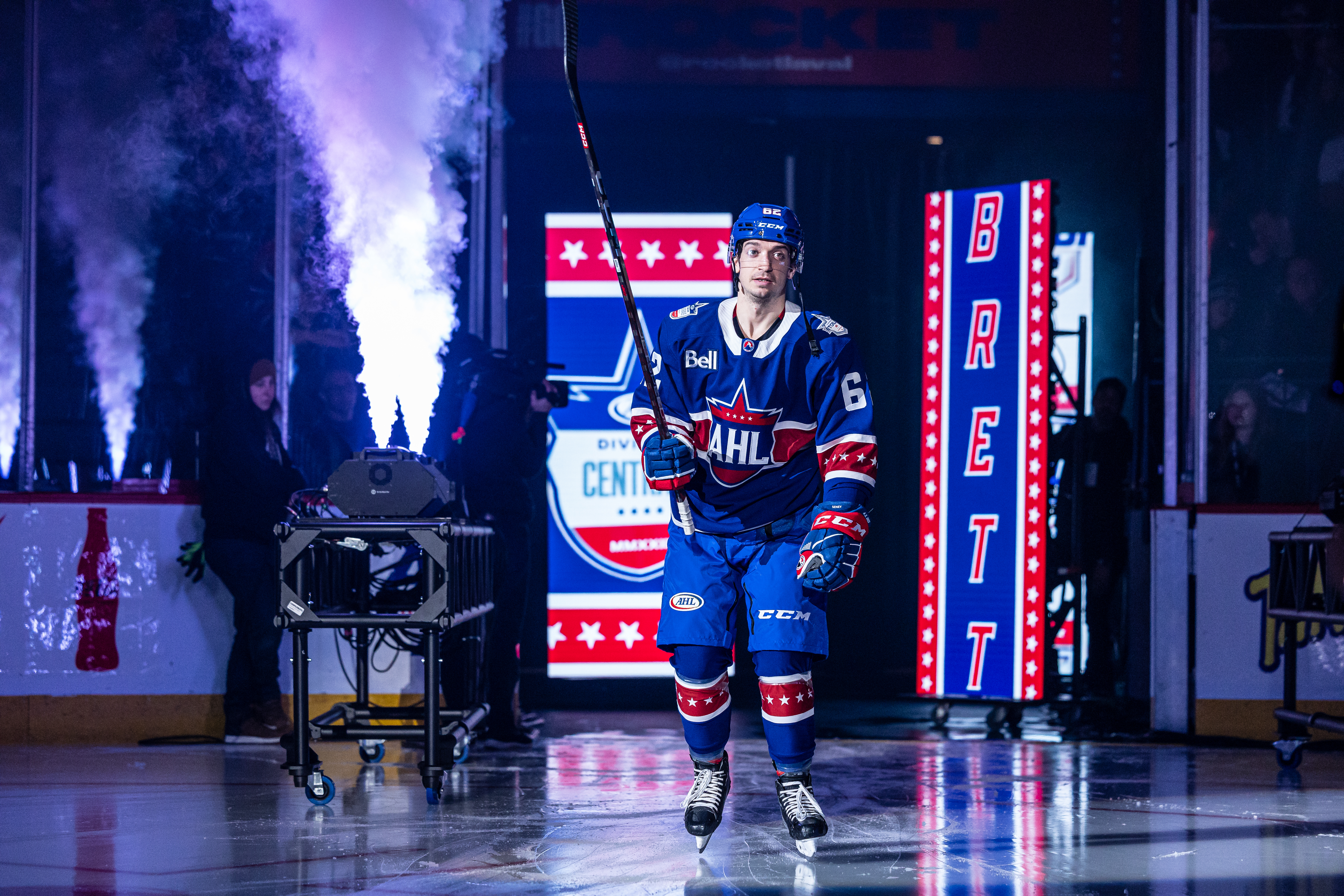
- Seney at the 2023 AHL All-Star Classic Game
- Born: February 28, 1996 (age 30) London, Ontario, Canada
- Height: 5 ft 9 in (175 cm)
- Weight: 156 lb (71 kg; 11 st 2 lb)
- Position: Left wing
- Shoots: Left
- AHL team Former teams: Rockford IceHogs; New Jersey Devils; Toronto Maple Leafs; Chicago Blackhawks
- NHL draft: 157th overall, 2015; New Jersey Devils
- Playing career: 2018–present

Brett Seney (born February 28, 1996) is a Canadian professional ice hockey forward and captain for the Rockford IceHogs of the American Hockey League (AHL). Seney was drafted by the New Jersey Devils 157th overall in the 2015 NHL entry draft.

Prior to turning professional, Seney played for Merrimack College where he was honoured as a Hockey East Third Team All-Star.

== Playing career ==
Seney was selected 157th overall in the 2015 NHL entry draft by the New Jersey Devils. He was committed to play for Merrimack College in October 2015, but after a successful season with the Kingston Voyageurs he was asked to start a season earlier. In his sophomore, junior, and senior season at Merrimack College, Seney was named to the Hockey East All-Academic Team. In his senior year he was named to the Hockey East Third Team All-Star.

On March 16, 2018, at the conclusion of his senior season, Seney signed a two-year, entry-level contract with the Devils. He was assigned to the Devils American Hockey League team, the Binghamton Devils, for the 2018–19 season. On November 3, 2018, Seney made his NHL debut as the Devils lost 3–0 to the New York Islanders. On November 11, Seney recorded his first career NHL goal in a 5–2 loss to the Winnipeg Jets.

On July 29, 2021, Seney signed a one-year, two-way contract with the Toronto Maple Leafs.

At the conclusion of his contract with the Maple Leafs, Seney left as a free agent and signed a one-year, two-way contract with the Chicago Blackhawks on July 13, 2022. On October 12, 2024, Seney was named Captain of the Rockford IceHogs On June 23, 2025, Seney re-signed with the IceHogs on a two-year AHL contract.

== Personal life ==
His older brother Joe attends the University of Oxford and plays for university's team in the British Universities Ice Hockey Association (BUIHA).

== Career statistics ==
			Regular season					Playoffs
Season	Team	League	GP	G	A	Pts	PIM	GP	G	A	Pts	PIM
2012–13	Kingston Voyageurs	OJHL	49	3	7	10	18	15	2	0	2	8
2013–14	Kingston Voyageurs	OJHL	49	26	43	69	67	11	5	7	12	12
2014–15	Merrimack College	HE	34	11	15	26	55	—	—	—	—	—
2015–16	Merrimack College	HE	32	8	18	26	34	—	—	—	—	—
2016–17	Merrimack College	HE	36	10	21	31	38	—	—	—	—	—
2017–18	Merrimack College	HE	37	13	19	32	48	—	—	—	—	—
2017–18	Binghamton Devils	AHL	12	3	5	8	16	—	—	—	—	—
2018–19	Binghamton Devils	AHL	26	3	16	19	48	—	—	—	—	—
2018–19	New Jersey Devils	NHL	51	5	8	13	31	—	—	—	—	—
2019–20	Binghamton Devils	AHL	61	19	25	44	66	—	—	—	—	—
2019–20	New Jersey Devils	NHL	2	0	0	0	0	—	—	—	—	—
2020–21	Binghamton Devils	AHL	30	5	5	10	22	—	—	—	—	—
2021–22	Toronto Marlies	AHL	62	17	42	59	81	—	—	—	—	—
2021–22	Toronto Maple Leafs	NHL	2	0	0	0	0	—	—	—	—	—
2022–23	Rockford IceHogs	AHL	59	23	31	54	57	5	1	1	2	6
2022–23	Chicago Blackhawks	NHL	7	1	0	1	2	—	—	—	—	—
2023–24	Rockford IceHogs	AHL	68	23	40	63	60	4	0	1	1	6
2023–24	Chicago Blackhawks	NHL	4	0	0	0	6	—	—	—	—	—
2024–25	Rockford IceHogs	AHL	58	10	29	39	59	7	1	2	3	8
2025–26	Rockford IceHogs	AHL	66	17	34	51	65	—	—	—	—	—
NHL totals			66	6	8	14	39	—	—	—	—	—

== Awards and honours ==
Award	Year
College
HE Third Team All-Star	2018
HE All-Academic Team	2016, 2017, 2018
