= Tower Lakes, Illinois =

- Village
- Logo

- Location of Tower Lakes in Lake County, Illinois.
- Coordinates: 42°13′53″N 88°09′14″W
- Country: United States
- State: Illinois
- County: Lake
- Township: Cuba

Area
  - Total: 1.04 sq mi (2.70 km^{2})
  - Land: 0.92 sq mi (2.38 km^{2})
  - Water: 0.12 sq mi (0.32 km^{2})
- Elevation: 768 ft (234 m)

Population (2020)
  - Total: 1,226
  - Density: 1,334.1/sq mi (515.11/km^{2})
- Time zone: UTC-6 (CST)
  - Summer (DST): UTC-5 (CDT)
- ZIP code: 60010
- Area code(s): 847, 224
- FIPS code: 17-75874
- GNIS feature ID: 2399999
- Website: www.towerlakes-il.gov

Tower Lakes is a village in Lake County, Illinois, United States. Per the 2020 census, the population was 1,226.

== Geography ==
According to the 2021 census gazetteer files, Tower Lakes has a total area of 1.04 square miles (2.69 km^{2}), of which 0.92 square miles (2.38 km^{2}) (or 88.03%) is land and 0.13 square miles (0.34 km^{2}) (or 11.97%) is water.

== Demographics ==
Historical population
Census	Pop.	Note	%±
1970	932		—
1980	1,177		26.3%
1990	1,333		13.3%
2000	1,310		−1.7%
2010	1,283		−2.1%
2020	1,226		−4.4%
U.S. Decennial Census; 2010 2020

=== Racial and ethnic composition ===
Tower Lakes village, Illinois – Racial and ethnic composition Note: the US Census treats Hispanic/Latino as an ethnic category. This table excludes Latinos from the racial categories and assigns them to a separate category. Hispanics/Latinos may be of any race.
Race / Ethnicity (NH = Non-Hispanic)	Pop 2000	Pop 2010	Pop 2020	% 2000	% 2010	% 2020
White alone (NH)	1,266	1,185	1,050	96.64%	92.36%	85.64%
Black or African American alone (NH)	4	8	15	0.31%	0.62%	1.22%
Native American or Alaska Native alone (NH)	1	0	3	0.08%	0.00%	0.24%
Asian alone (NH)	10	22	32	0.76%	1.71%	2.61%
Native Hawaiian or Pacific Islander alone (NH)	0	1	0	0.00%	0.08%	0.00%
Other race alone (NH)	0	1	8	0.00%	0.08%	0.65%
Mixed race or Multiracial (NH)	11	22	59	0.84%	1.71%	4.81%
Hispanic or Latino (any race)	18	44	59	1.37%	3.43%	4.81%
Total	1,310	1,283	1,226	100.00%	100.00%	100.00%

=== 2020 census ===
As of the 2020 census, Tower Lakes had a population of 1,226. The median age was 47.3 years. 23.8% of residents were under the age of 18 and 20.1% of residents were 65 years of age or older. For every 100 females there were 97.7 males, and for every 100 females age 18 and over there were 96.2 males age 18 and over.

100.0% of residents lived in urban areas, while 0.0% lived in rural areas.

There were 418 households in Tower Lakes, of which 35.4% had children under the age of 18 living in them. Of all households, 76.6% were married-couple households, 7.2% were households with a male householder and no spouse or partner present, and 12.9% were households with a female householder and no spouse or partner present. About 12.6% of all households were made up of individuals and 5.5% had someone living alone who was 65 years of age or older.

There were 440 housing units, of which 5.0% were vacant. The homeowner vacancy rate was 0.7% and the rental vacancy rate was 16.0%.

=== Income and poverty ===
The median income for a household in the village was $143,250, and the median income for a family was $150,417. Males had a median income of $94,688 versus $36,528 for females. The per capita income for the village was $67,989. About 1.5% of families and 2.6% of the population were below the poverty line, including 4.1% of those under age 18 and 3.5% of those age 65 or over.

== Notable Person ==
- Connor Mackey - NHL Hockey Player signed with the Calgary Flames
