= Miro Karjalainen =

Finnish ice hockey player (born 1996)

- Born: May 23, 1996 (age 30) Nummela, Finland
- Height: 6 ft 6 in (198 cm)
- Weight: 225 lb (102 kg; 16 st 1 lb)
- Position: Defender
- Shoots: Right
- Liiga team Former teams: HIFK; Idaho Steelheads; HPK
- NHL draft: 135th overall, 2014; Dallas Stars
- Playing career: 2015–present

Miro Karjalainen (born May 23, 1996) is a Finnish professional ice hockey player, currently playing for HIFK of the Liiga.

== Playing career ==
Miro Karjalainen began his career in 2011–12 season playing for Espoo Blues in the C-junior SM-Liiga (U-16 League of Finland). For the start of 2012–2013 season Karjalainen left Espoo Blues and joined in Kiekko-Vantaa to play in their team in the B-junior SM-Liiga (U-18 League of Finland). Later on that season Karjalainen left Kiekko-Vantaa and joined back to his youth team EKS to play the B-junior SM-Liiga, he also got to play two games in EKS Men's elite-team that played on 5th highest league of Finland.

In 2013–14 season Karjalainen played in Jokerit Helsinki B-junior team where he at the end of the season won U-18 League Championship of Finland. In April 2014 Miro Karjalainen was named on the 139th spot in the European Skaters Ranking regarding the 2014 NHL entry draft. Eventually, he was drafted by Dallas Stars on 5th. round (135th overall).

Under the 2014–15 season Karjalainen made a three-year Liiga contract with HIFK Helsinki. His start of the season however was ruined by an injury and eventually he got to play just 10 regular season and 3 playoff games in the HIFK A-juniors (U-20 League of Finland) and couldn't made his elite league debut just yet. Karjalainen played his debut game in the Liiga in 2015–2016 season on December 4, 2015, against HPK when he was hoisted up from the A-juniors due to injured players in the HIFK's main roster. That game was one of the two games Karjalainen got to play in the elite team, most of the regular season he played still with the A-juniors and took 105 penalty-minutes which earned him the 3rd spot in the A-Junior SM-Liiga Penalty Ranking. At the end of the season, Karjalainen was lend to Kiekko-Vantaa where he played 7 regular season and 7 playoff games scoring two assists in the second-highest men's league of Finland named Mestis.

On the 2016–17 season, Karjalainen found his way in to the HIFK's main roster. He tallied his first career Liiga-goal on his 4th career Liiga-game with a one-timer-slap-shot from the blue-line against Eero Kilpeläinen of KalPa on September 27, 2016. Karjalainen tied the game just 2.40 left of the regular-time and after HIFK eventually won the game Karjalainen was awarded as the 1st-star of the game. Miro Karjalainen played 4 regular season games in the Liiga and one Champions Hockey League game before signing a one-year AHL-contract with the Dallas Stars affiliate, the Texas Stars after attending their 2016 training camp. He was assigned to begin his first North American season, with ECHL affiliate, the Idaho Steelheads, on October 11, 2016. Karjalainen played out the season with the Steelheads, registering just 3 points in 24 games as he was unable to impress to feature with the Texas Stars.

On April 28, 2017, Karjalainen opted to return to the Finnish ranks, securing a one-year contract with HPK of the Liiga.

== Career statistics ==
			Regular season					Playoffs
Season	Team	League	GP	G	A	Pts	PIM	GP	G	A	Pts	PIM
2014–15	HIFK	Jr. A	10	0	1	1	8	3	2	0	2	0
2015–16	HIFK	Jr. A	17	1	6	7	105	—	—	—	—	—
2015–16	HIFK	Liiga	2	0	0	0	0	—	—	—	—	—
2015–16	Kiekko-Vantaa	Mestis	7	0	0	0	25	7	0	2	2	4
2016–17	HIFK	Jr. A	6	1	2	3	43	—	—	—	—	—
2016–17	HIFK	Liiga	4	1	0	1	0	—	—	—	—	—
2016–17	Idaho Steelheads	ECHL	24	1	2	3	21	—	—	—	—	—
2017–18	HPK	Liiga	36	2	3	5	135	—	—	—	—	—
2018–19	HPK	Liiga	47	4	3	7	68	17	0	1	1	26
Liiga totals			89	7	6	13	203	17	0	1	1	26

== Awards and honours ==
Award	Year
Liiga
Champion (HPK)	2019
