= Jyrki Jokipakka =

Finnish ice hockey player (born 1991)

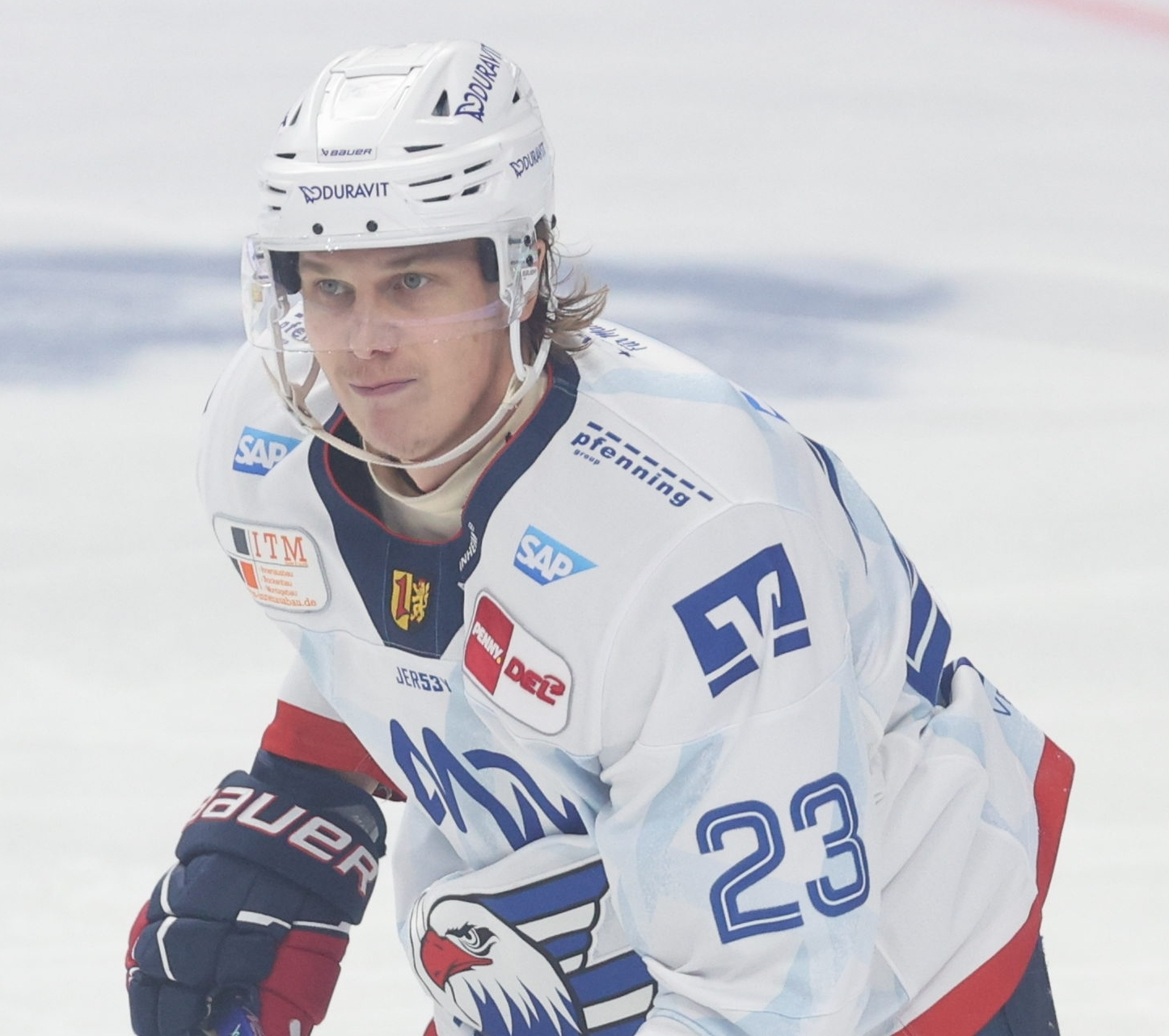
- Jokipakka with the Adler Mannheim in 2024
- Born: 20 August 1991 (age 35) Tampere, Finland
- Height: 6 ft 3 in (191 cm)
- Weight: 198 lb (90 kg; 14 st 2 lb)
- Position: Defence
- Shoots: Left
- DEL team Former teams: Adler Mannheim; Ilves; Dallas Stars; Calgary Flames; Ottawa Senators; HC Sochi; Sibir Novosibirsk
- National team: Finland
- NHL draft: 195th overall, 2011; Dallas Stars
- Playing career: 2010–present

Jyrki Jokipakka (English: /ˈjɜːrki joʊkɪˈpækə/ YUR-kee yoh-ki-PAK-ə, born 20 August 1991) is a Finnish professional ice hockey defenceman who is under contract to Adler Mannheim of the Deutsche Eishockey Liga (DEL). He was selected by the Dallas Stars in the seventh round (195th overall) of the 2011 NHL entry draft.

== Playing career ==
Jokipakka made his professional debut in his native Finland with Ilves Tampere of the Finnish Liiga after playing with his hometown club as a youth. On 14 June 2012, Jokipakka was signed to a three-year entry-level contract with the Dallas Stars. He was then loaned back to his original club Ilves for the 2012–13 season.

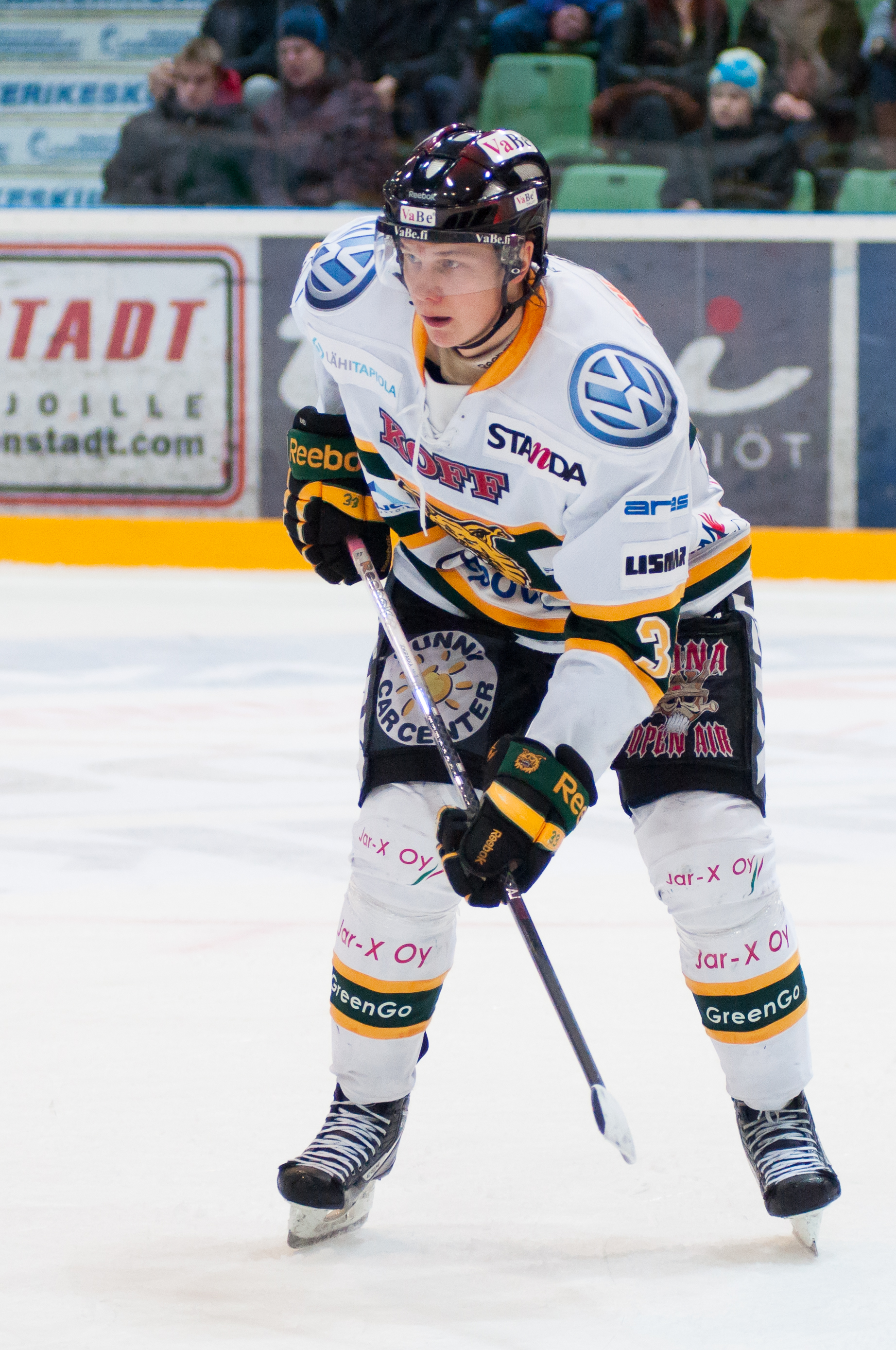
Jokipakka with Ilves in 2012

In his first North American season in 2013–14, Jokipakka was assigned to American Hockey League affiliate, the Texas Stars. He remained with Texas for the duration of the campaign posting 5 goals and 21 points in 68 games from the blueline. He also contributed with 5 assists in 21 post-season games in helping Texas claim their first Calder Cup championship.

During the 2014–15 season, Jokipakka made his NHL debut with the Stars on 24 October 2014, against the New Jersey Devils at the Prudential Center.

In the following 2015–16 season, Jokipakka made his first opening night roster and appeared in 40 games with the Stars before he was dealt at the trade deadline, along with prospect Brett Pollock and a conditional second-round pick in 2016 to the Calgary Flames in exchange for Kris Russell on 29 February 2016.

In the 2016–17 season, for a second consecutive year, Jokipakka was dealt by the Flames on the day of the trade deadline to the Ottawa Senators along with a conditional second-round pick in exchange for Curtis Lazar and Michael Kostka. Jokipakka made his Senators' debut on 30 March 2017 versus the Minnesota Wild.

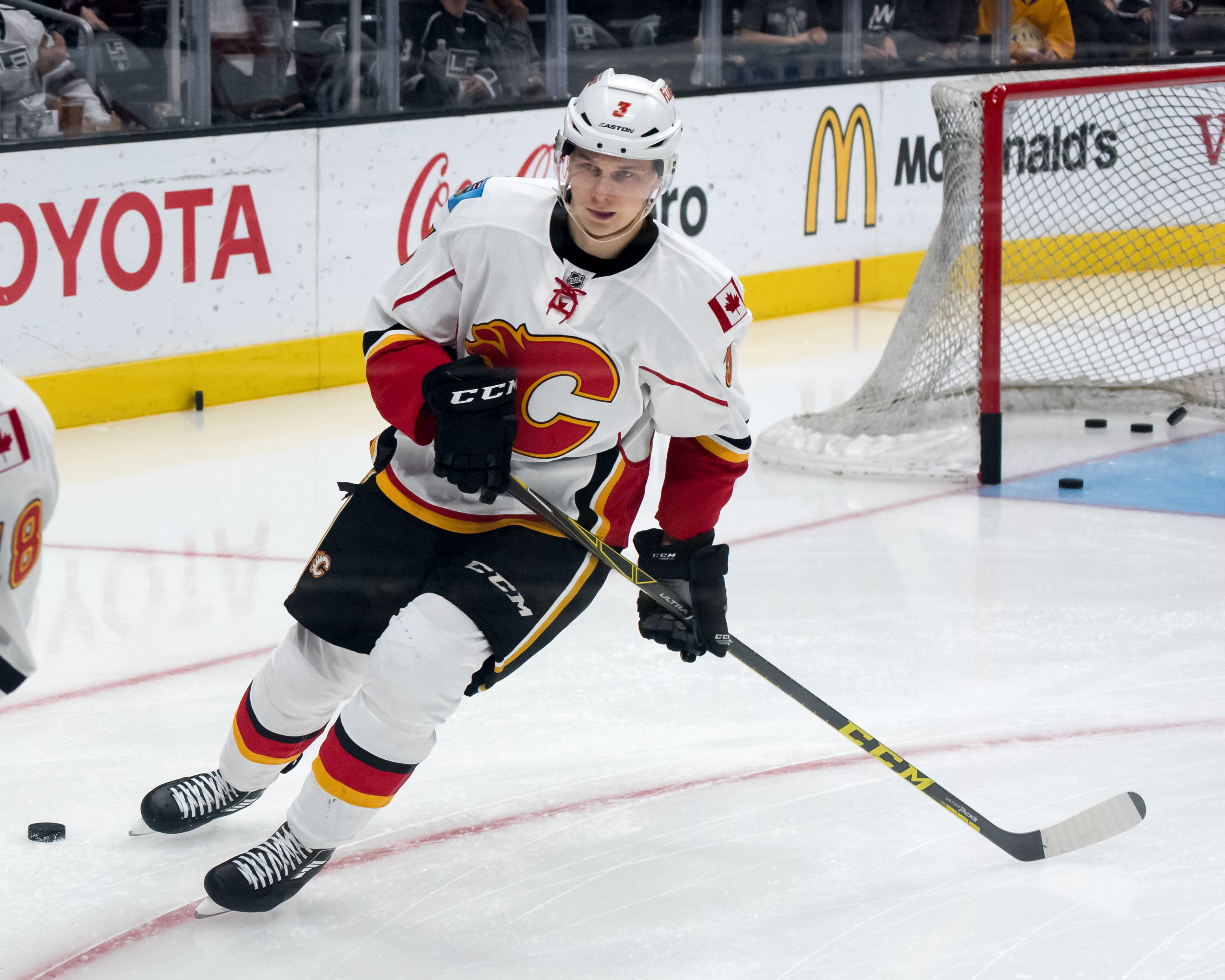
Jokipakka with the Calgary Flames in 2016

The Senators opted not to re-sign Jokipakka, making him an unrestricted free agent. On 5 September 2017, the Washington Capitals signed Jokipakka to a professional try-out (PTO), where he would attend the team's training camp.

Jokipakka signed a one-year deal with the HC Sochi Leopards of the Kontinental Hockey League (KHL) in October 2017. He re-signed with Sochi for a second season in 2018.

As a free agent, Jokipakka left Sochi following the 2018–19 season and signed an initial one-year deal with Sibir Novosibirsk of the KHL on 27 August 2019. In March 2022, Jokipakka left Sibir Novosibirsk during playoffs due to the Russian invasion of Ukraine.

On 1 May 2022, Jokipakka was announced to have signed a two-year contract with Avtomobilist Yekaterinburg of the KHL. However, with the signing previously agreed before the Russian invasion of Ukraine, Jokipakka rejected returning to the KHL and on 23 June 2022, he returned to his original Finnish club, Ilves of the Liiga, on a one-year contract.

On 21 April 2023, Jokipakka agreed to a two-year contract beginning in the 2023–24 season in joining German club, Adler Mannheim of the DEL.

== Career statistics ==
=== Regular season and playoffs ===
| | | | Regular season | | | | | Playoffs |
| Season | Team | League | GP | G | A | Pts | PIM | GP | G | A | Pts | PIM |
|---|---|---|---|---|---|---|---|---|---|---|---|---|
| 2007–08 | Ilves | FIN U17 Q | 12 | 2 | 10 | 12 | 14 | — | — | — | — | — |
| 2007–08 | Ilves | FIN U17 | 12 | 4 | 5 | 9 | 12 | — | — | — | — | — |
| 2008–09 | Ilves | FIN U18 Q | 9 | 1 | 1 | 2 | 2 | — | — | — | — | — |
| 2008–09 | Ilves | FIN U18 | 24 | 3 | 6 | 9 | 10 | — | — | — | — | — |
| 2008–09 | Ilves | FIN U20 | 4 | 0 | 0 | 0 | 2 | — | — | — | — | — |
| 2009–10 | Ilves | FIN U20 | 38 | 3 | 12 | 15 | 77 | 5 | 1 | 0 | 1 | 2 |
| 2010–11 | Ilves | FIN U20 | 3 | 0 | 0 | 0 | 6 | — | — | — | — | — |
| 2010–11 | Ilves | SM-l | 48 | 1 | 8 | 9 | 18 | 5 | 0 | 0 | 0 | 2 |
| 2010–11 | LeKi | Mestis | 1 | 0 | 0 | 0 | 0 | — | — | — | — | — |
| 2011–12 | Ilves | FIN U20 | 1 | 0 | 1 | 1 | 2 | — | — | — | — | — |
| 2011–12 | Ilves | SM-l | 52 | 9 | 8 | 17 | 18 | — | — | — | — | — |
| 2011–12 | LeKi | Mestis | 3 | 1 | 0 | 1 | 0 | — | — | — | — | — |
| 2012–13 | Ilves | SM-l | 59 | 5 | 13 | 18 | 20 | — | — | — | — | — |
| 2013–14 | Texas Stars | AHL | 68 | 5 | 16 | 21 | 32 | 21 | 0 | 5 | 5 | 8 |
| 2014–15 | Texas Stars | AHL | 19 | 3 | 2 | 5 | 4 | — | — | — | — | — |
| 2014–15 | Dallas Stars | NHL | 51 | 0 | 10 | 10 | 8 | — | — | — | — | — |
| 2015–16 | Dallas Stars | NHL | 40 | 2 | 4 | 6 | 6 | — | — | — | — | — |
| 2015–16 | Calgary Flames | NHL | 18 | 0 | 6 | 6 | 8 | — | — | — | — | — |
| 2016–17 | Calgary Flames | NHL | 38 | 1 | 5 | 6 | 12 | — | — | — | — | — |
| 2016–17 | Ottawa Senators | NHL | 3 | 0 | 0 | 0 | 0 | — | — | — | — | — |
| 2017–18 | HC Sochi | KHL | 35 | 2 | 9 | 11 | 42 | 5 | 1 | 1 | 2 | 4 |
| 2018–19 | HC Sochi | KHL | 59 | 10 | 14 | 24 | 10 | 5 | 1 | 1 | 2 | 16 |
| 2019–20 | Sibir Novosibirsk | KHL | 58 | 4 | 28 | 32 | 16 | 5 | 0 | 4 | 4 | 2 |
| 2020–21 | Sibir Novosibirsk | KHL | 59 | 5 | 19 | 24 | 12 | — | — | — | — | — |
| 2021–22 | Sibir Novosibirsk | KHL | 31 | 3 | 11 | 14 | 10 | 1 | 0 | 0 | 0 | 0 |
| 2022–23 | Ilves | Liiga | 50 | 5 | 14 | 19 | 16 | 12 | 1 | 4 | 5 | 4 |
| 2023–24 | Adler Mannheim | DEL | 52 | 5 | 16 | 21 | 12 | 7 | 0 | 1 | 1 | 2 |
| 2024–25 | Adler Mannheim | DEL | 51 | 5 | 13 | 18 | 22 | 10 | 1 | 5 | 6 | 2 |
| Liiga totals | | | 209 | 20 | 43 | 63 | 72 | 17 | 1 | 4 | 5 | 6 |
| NHL totals | | | 150 | 3 | 25 | 28 | 34 | — | — | — | — | — |
| KHL totals | | | 242 | 24 | 81 | 105 | 90 | 16 | 2 | 6 | 8 | 22 |

=== International ===
| Year | Team | Event | Result | GP | G | A | Pts | PIM |
|---|---|---|---|---|---|---|---|---|
| 2011 | Finland | WJC | 6th | 6 | 1 | 2 | 3 | 4 |
| 2015 | Finland | WC | 6th | 8 | 2 | 0 | 2 | 2 |
| 2016 | Finland | WCH | 8th | 2 | 0 | 0 | 0 | 2 |
| Junior totals | | | | 6 | 1 | 2 | 3 | 4 |
| Senior totals | | | | 10 | 2 | 0 | 2 | 4 |
