= Antoine Roussel =

French ice hockey player (born 1989)

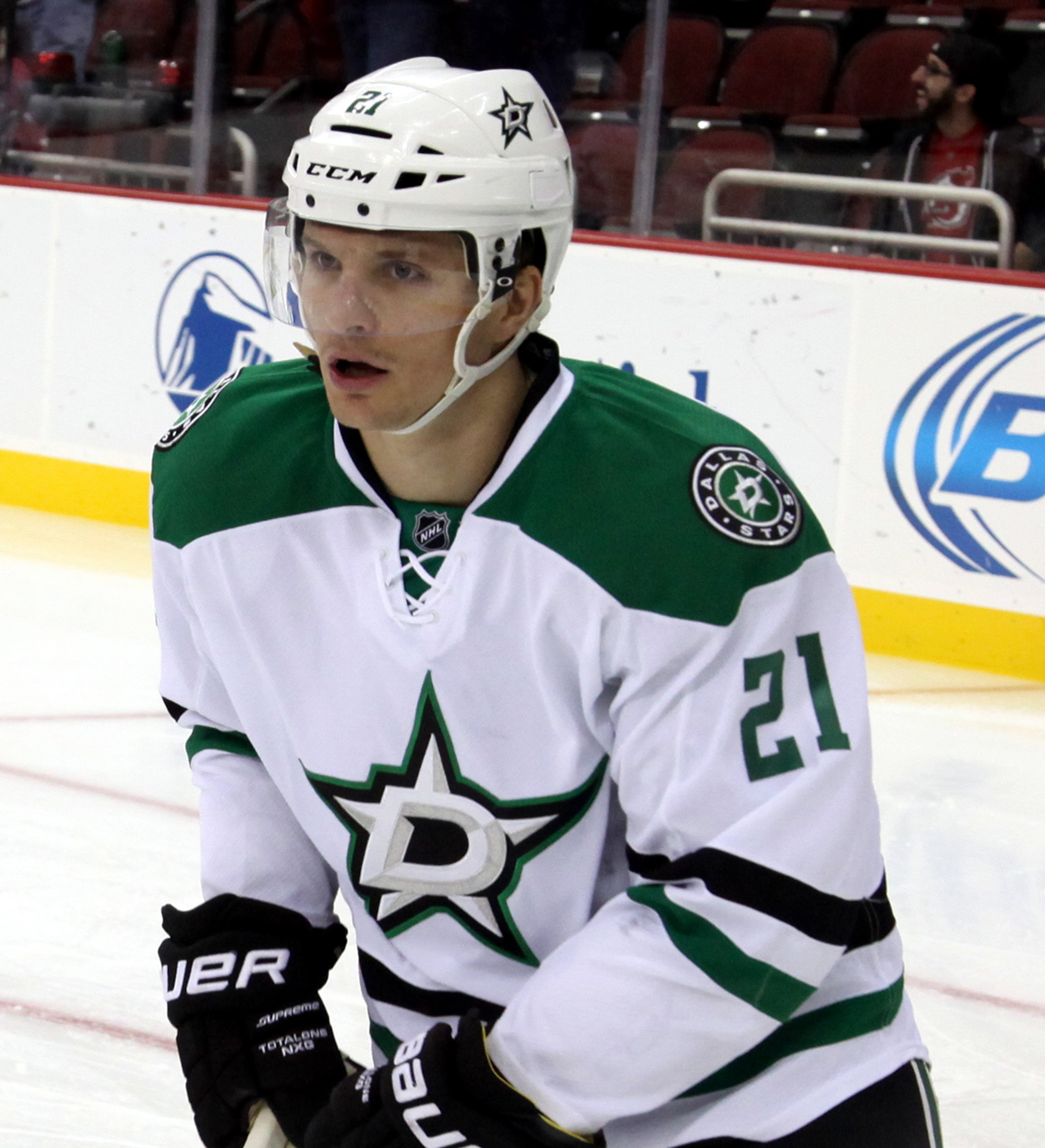
- Roussel with the Dallas Stars in 2014
- Born: 21 November 1989 (age 36) Roubaix, France
- Height: 6 ft 0 in (183 cm)
- Weight: 200 lb (91 kg; 14 st 4 lb)
- Position: Left wing
- Shot: Left
- Played for: Dallas Stars; Vancouver Canucks; Arizona Coyotes
- National team: France
- NHL draft: Undrafted
- Playing career: 2010–2022

Antoine Roussel (born 21 November 1989) is a French former professional ice hockey left winger. He most recently played for the Arizona Coyotes of the National Hockey League (NHL). Born in France, Roussel first played hockey there before moving to Quebec at the age of 16. After four years in the Quebec Major Junior Hockey League (QMJHL), he turned professional and played in the American Hockey League (AHL) and ECHL, minor leagues in North America. Signed by the Dallas Stars of the National Hockey League (NHL) in 2012, he made his NHL debut in 2013 for the club. Regarded as a physical player, Roussel has consistently been one of the NHL's leaders in penalty minutes since he entered the league. He has scored 10 or more goals and earned 100 PIM in the same season six times in his career. Internationally Roussel has represented the French national team both at the junior and senior level, including multiple World Championships.

== Early life ==
Roussel was born in Roubaix, France. He first played rugby as a child, but was released from his team after repeatedly running off the field during the heated summer practices. As a result, his mother Sarah enrolled him in hockey, deciding the cooler rink would benefit Roussel. As a youth, he played in the 2002 Quebec International Pee-Wee Hockey Tournament with a team from Nantes. At the age of 16, Roussel and his family moved to Canada, settling in Quebec. He also holds Canadian citizenship.

== Playing career ==
=== Junior ===
After arriving in Canada in 2006, Roussel played midget hockey for the Collège Charles-Lemoyne Riverains in Longueuil. Later that season, Roussel joined the Chicoutimi Saguenéens of the QMJHL, where he played for four years.

=== Professional ===
Undrafted in the NHL entry draft, Roussel signed an AHL contract on 9 August 2010 with the Providence Bruins, where he played the 2010–11 season. After being a healthy scratch for several Providence games, he was temporarily reassigned to the Reading Royals of the ECHL, where he played in five games.

Roussel was not offered another contract by the Bruins, but was later invited to attend the Vancouver Canucks' prospect camp. His performance there led to him signing a contract with the Chicago Wolves, which at the time were the Canucks' minor league affiliate in the AHL. He played for the Wolves for the 2011–12 season.

=== Dallas Stars ===
On 2 July 2012, Roussel signed a contract with the Dallas Stars. During the 2012–13 season, Roussel split his time between Dallas and their AHL affiliate, the Texas Stars. For the 2013–14 season, Roussel played with the Dallas Stars for the entire season, playing 81 games. On 22 July 2014, the Stars announced that Roussel had signed a four-year, $8 million contract extension with the team.

During the 2016–17 season on 18 February 2017, Roussel scored his first NHL hat trick against the Tampa Bay Lightning. He was the second ever French-born NHL player to do so, joining Paul MacLean. A hand injury would end his season in early March.

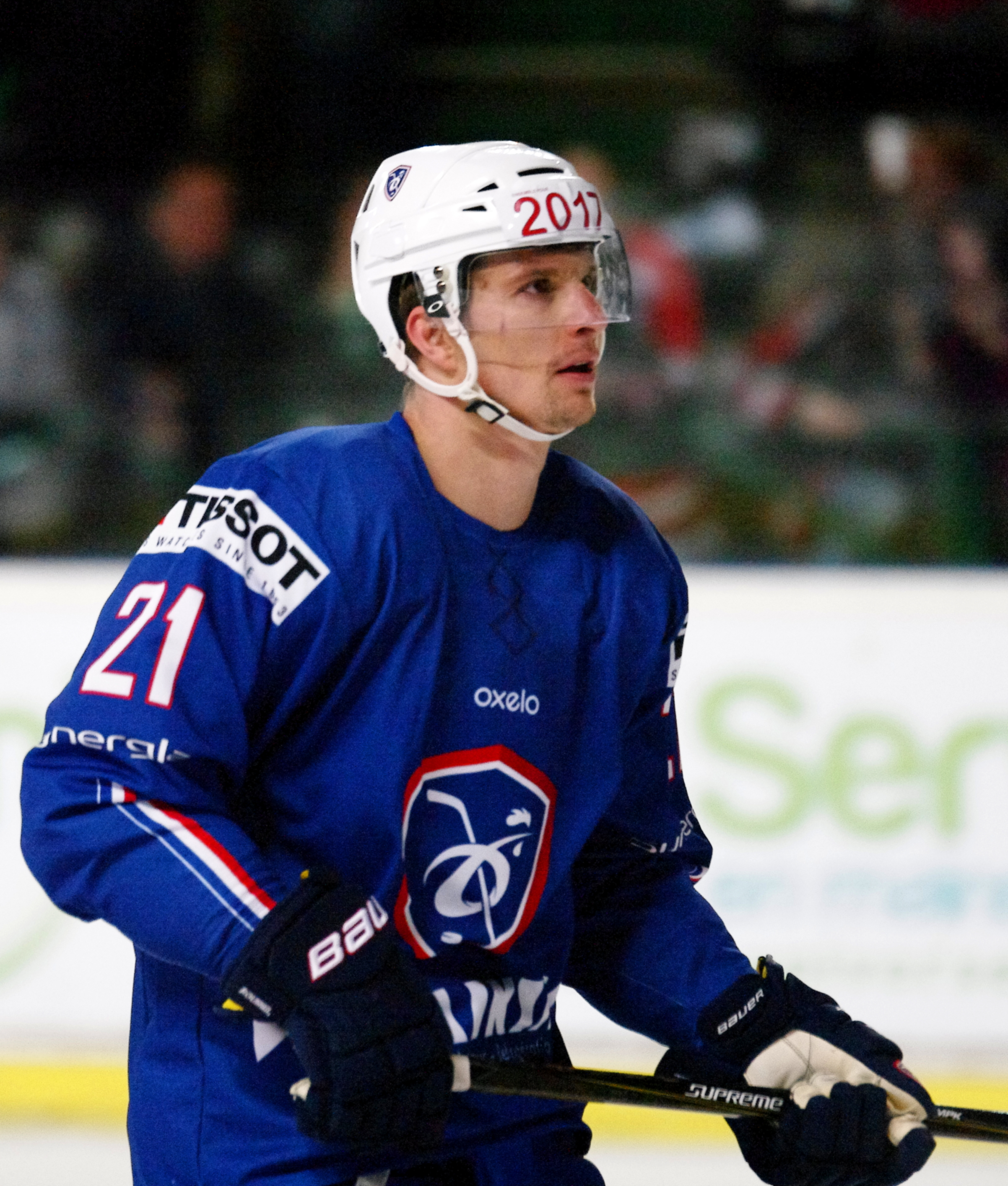
Roussel with the French national team in 2017

=== Vancouver Canucks ===
After six seasons with the Stars, Roussel left as a free agent and on 1 July 2018, he signed a four-year, $12 million contract with the Vancouver Canucks. Roussel set a career-high in points in 2018–19 with the Canucks, with 31, before suffering a season-ending knee injury on 13 March 2019, during a game against the New York Rangers. Roussel's injury was later revealed to be a torn anterior cruciate ligament or ACL. After undergoing surgery in late-March, Roussel's recovery carried over into the 2019–20 NHL season. Expected to miss the first two months of the season, Roussel made his return to the lineup on 3 December in a 5–2 win over the Ottawa Senators, scoring two goals, including one on his first shift since the injury.

=== Arizona Coyotes ===
On 23 July 2021, Roussel was traded, along with Jay Beagle, Loui Eriksson, a 2021 first-round pick, a 2022 second-round pick and a 2023 seventh-round pick, to the Arizona Coyotes in exchange for Oliver Ekman-Larsson and Conor Garland.

== International play ==
Roussel was a member of the French national team at the 2012, 2013, 2014, 2015 and 2017 IIHF World Championships. At the end of the 2014 tournament, he was selected as a Media All-Star after a very successful tournament, scoring 11 points in eight games.

== Career statistics ==
=== Regular season and playoffs ===
			Regular season					Playoffs
Season	Team	League	GP	G	A	Pts	PIM	GP	G	A	Pts	PIM
2004–05	Rouen	FRA U18	8	4	5	9	4	2	2	2	4	0
2006–07	Collège Charles-Lemoy Riverains	QMAAA	12	4	10	14	18	—	—	—	—	—
2006–07	Chicoutimi Saguenéens	QMJHL	56	7	13	20	55	4	0	0	0	14
2007–08	Chicoutimi Saguenéens	QMJHL	70	13	24	37	121	5	0	4	4	29
2008–09	Chicoutimi Saguenéens	QMJHL	58	15	20	35	110	4	0	2	2	15
2009–10	Chicoutimi Saguenéens	QMJHL	68	24	23	47	131	7	4	5	9	10
2010–11	Providence Bruins	AHL	42	1	7	8	88	—	—	—	—	—
2010–11	Reading Royals	ECHL	5	0	1	1	7	8	0	3	3	14
2011–12	Chicago Wolves	AHL	61	4	5	9	177	2	0	0	0	6
2012–13	Texas Stars	AHL	43	8	11	19	107	—	—	—	—	—
2012–13	Dallas Stars	NHL	39	7	7	14	85	—	—	—	—	—
2013–14	Dallas Stars	NHL	81	14	15	29	209	6	0	3	3	27
2014–15	Dallas Stars	NHL	80	13	12	25	148	—	—	—	—	—
2015–16	Dallas Stars	NHL	80	13	16	29	123	13	2	0	2	16
2016–17	Dallas Stars	NHL	60	12	15	27	115	—	—	—	—	—
2017–18	Dallas Stars	NHL	73	5	12	17	126	—	—	—	—	—
2018–19	Vancouver Canucks	NHL	65	9	22	31	118	—	—	—	—	—
2019–20	Vancouver Canucks	NHL	41	7	6	13	43	17	2	2	4	46
2019–20	Utica Comets	AHL	2	0	1	1	4	—	—	—	—	—
2020–21	Vancouver Canucks	NHL	35	1	3	4	37	—	—	—	—	—
2021–22	Arizona Coyotes	NHL	53	4	4	8	59	—	—	—	—	—
NHL totals			607	85	112	197	1,063	36	4	5	9	89

=== International ===
Year	Team	Event	Result	GP	G	A	Pts	PIM
2006	France	U18 D1	18th	5	0	1	1	8
2009	France	WJC D1	15th	5	6	2	8	2
2012	France	WC	9th	7	2	1	3	6
2013	France	WC	13th	7	2	1	3	10
2014	France	WC	8th	8	6	5	11	16
2015	France	WC	12th	7	0	2	2	34
2017	France	WC	9th	7	6	2	8	18
Junior totals				10	6	3	9	10
Senior totals				36	16	11	27	84

== Awards and honors ==
Award	Year	Ref
International
WC All-Star Team	2014	
