= List of Dallas Stars players =

This is a list of players who have played at least one game for the Dallas Stars (1993–94 to present) of the National Hockey League (NHL). This list does not include players from the Minnesota North Stars, Oakland Seals, California Golden Seals and Cleveland Barons of the NHL.

== Key ==
- * Appeared in a Stars game during the 2025–2026 season.
- † Stanley Cup Champion, Hockey Hall of Famer, or retired number.

Abbreviations
Nat	Nationality
GP	Games Played

Goaltenders
W	Wins	SO	Shutouts
L	Losses	GAA	Goals against average
T	Ties	SV%	Save percentage
OTL	Overtime loss		

Skaters
Pos	Position	RW	Right wing	A	Assists
D	Defenseman	C	Centre	P	Points
LW	Left wing	G	Goals	PIM	Penalty minutes

Note: Stats are updated through to the end of the 2025–2026 season

== Goaltenders ==
Name	Nationality	Seasons	GP	W	L	T	OTL	SO	GAA	SV%	GP	W	L	SO	GAA	SV%	Notes
Name	Nationality	Seasons	Regular season								Playoffs						Notes
Alex Auld	Canada	2009–2010	21	9	6	–	3	0	3.00	.894	–	–	–	–	–	–	
Richard Bachman	United States	2010–2013	32	14	10	–	1	1	2.94	.901	–	–	–	–	–	–	
Ed Belfour†	Canada	1997–2002	307	160	95	44	–	27	2.19	.910	73	44	29	8	1.89	.923	SC 1999; HHOF 2011
Allan Bester	Canada	1995–1996	10	4	5	1	–	0	3.00	.899	–	–	–	–	–	–	
Ben Bishop	United States	2017–2020	143	74	48	–	11	14	2.33	.923	16	8	8	0	2.67	.920	
Landon Bow	Canada	2018–2019	2	0	0	–	0	0	1.03	.947	–	–	–	–	–	–	
Jack Campbell	United States	2013–2014	1	0	1	–	0	0	6.00	.872	–	–	–	–	–	–	
Matt Climie	Canada	2008–2010	4	2	2	–	0	0	3.43	.886	–	–	–	–	–	–	
Casey DeSmith*	United States	2024–2026	57	29	16	–	8	3	2.50	.911	2	0	1	0	3.42	.882	
Dan Ellis	Canada	2003–2004; 2013–2014	15	6	6	–	0	1	3.04	.899	–	–	–	–	–	–	
Jhonas Enroth	Sweden	2014–2015	13	5	5	–	0	1	2.38	.906	–	–	–	–	–	–	
Manny Fernandez	Canada	1994–2000	33	12	11	4	–	1	2.48	.909	2	0	0	0	3.53	.875	
Johan Hedberg	Sweden	2005–2006	19	12	4	–	1	0	2.67	.898	–	–	–	–	–	–	
Corey Hirsch	Canada	2002–2003	2	0	1	0	–	0	2.47	.897	–	–	–	–	–	–	
Johan Holmqvist	Sweden	2007–2008	2	1	0	–	0	0	3.75	.857	–	–	–	–	–	–	
Braden Holtby	Canada	2021–2022	24	10	10	–	1	0	2.78	.913	–	–	–	–	–	–	
Arturs Irbe	Latvia	1996–1997	35	17	12	3	–	3	2.69	.893	1	0	0	0	0.00	1.000	
Anton Khudobin	Russia	2018–2022	112	47	40	–	17	5	2.54	.917	26	14	10	1	2.67	.918	
Brent Krahn	Canada	2008–2009	1	0	0	–	0	0	9.00	.667	–	–	–	–	–	–	
Kari Lehtonen	Finland	2009–2018	445	216	150	–	50	24	2.63	.912	17	8	7	2	3.05	.892	
Anders Lindback	Sweden	2014–2015	10	2	8	–	0	0	3.71	.875	–	–	–	–	–	–	
Mike McKenna	United States	2017–2018	2	1	1	–	0	0	2.97	.900	–	–	–	–	–	–	
Andy Moog	Canada	1993–1997	175	75	64	26	–	8	2.75	.904	16	5	11	0	3.07	.903	
Matt Murray	Canada	2022–2024	4	2	2	–	0	1	2.53	.885	–	–	–	–	–	–	
Antti Niemi	Finland	2015–2017	85	37	25	–	11	3	2.92	.900	5	1	3	0	3.29	.865	
Cristopher Nihlstorp	Sweden	2012–2014	6	1	3	–	1	0	3.27	.890	–	–	–	–	–	–	
Jake Oettinger*	United States	2019–2026	305	184	78	–	33	16	2.54	.910	71	34	34	2	2.70	.903	
Andrew Raycroft	Canada	2010–2012	29	10	13	–	0	2	3.10	.905	–	–	–	–	–	–	
Jussi Rynnas	Finland	2014–2015	2	0	1	–	0	0	4.57	.841	–	–	–	–	–	–	
Mike Smith	Canada	2006–2008	44	24	14	–	2	5	2.34	.909	–	–	–	–	–	–	
Tobias Stephan	Switzerland	2007–2009	11	1	3	–	2	0	3.49	.883	–	–	–	–	–	–	
Mike Torchia	Canada	1994–1995	6	3	2	1	–	0	3.30	.895	–	–	–	–	–	–	
Ron Tugnutt	Canada	2002–2004	42	18	17	5	–	5	2.45	.897	–	–	–	–	–	–	
Marty Turco	Canada	2000–2010	509	262	154	26	37	40	2.31	.911	47	21	26	4	2.17	.914	
Roman Turek†	Czech Republic	1996–1999	55	30	14	4	–	2	2.14	.911	–	–	–	–	–	–	SC 1999
Darcy Wakaluk	Canada	1993–1996	88	31	33	11	–	6	3.07	.895	6	4	1	0	2.97	.900	
Scott Wedgewood	United States	2021–2024	61	28	16	–	11	2	2.83	.907	3	0	0	0	2.28	.862	
Jordan Willis	Canada	1995–1996	1	0	1	0	–	0	3.16	.929	–	–	–	–	–	–	

== Skaters ==
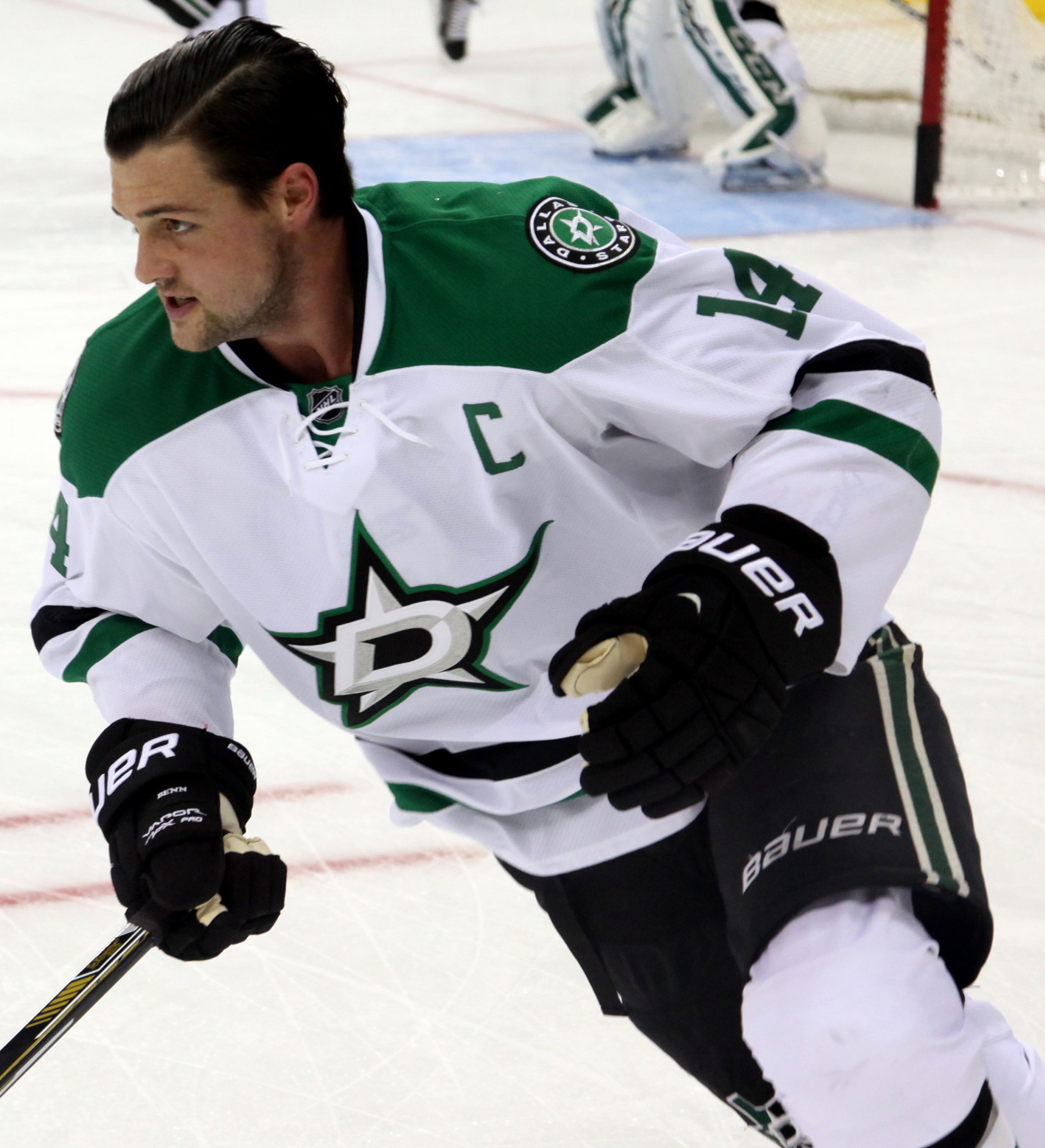
Jamie Benn

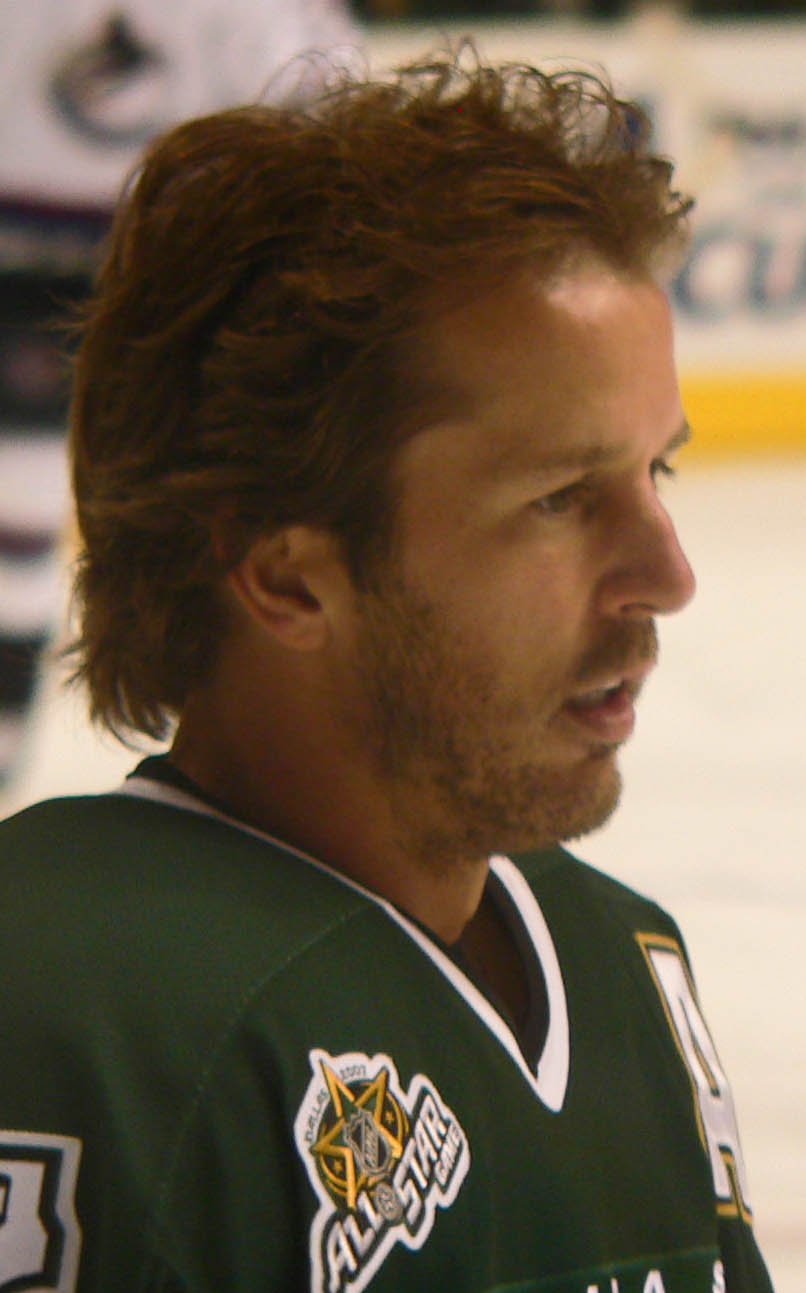
Mike Modano

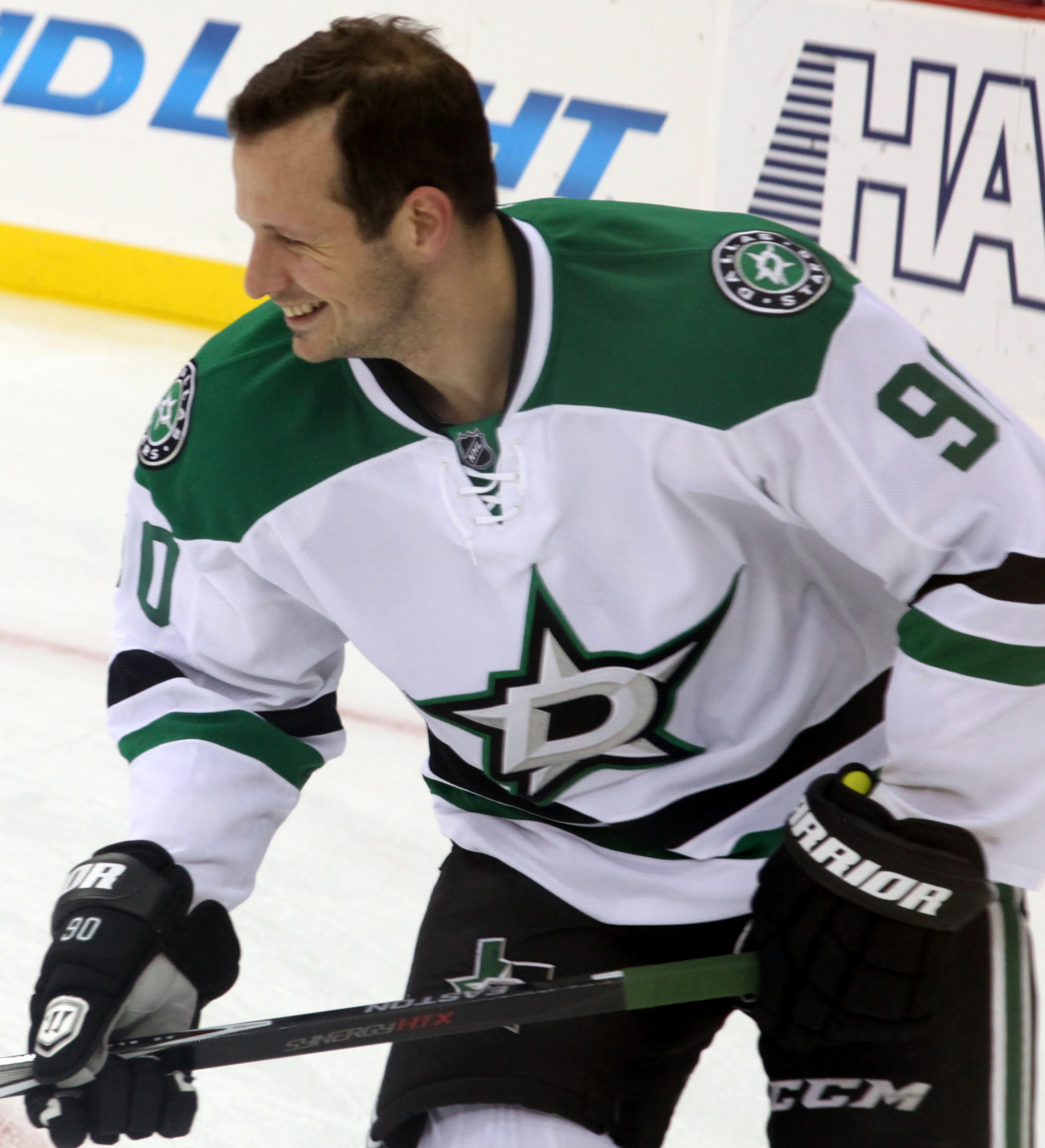
Jason Spezza

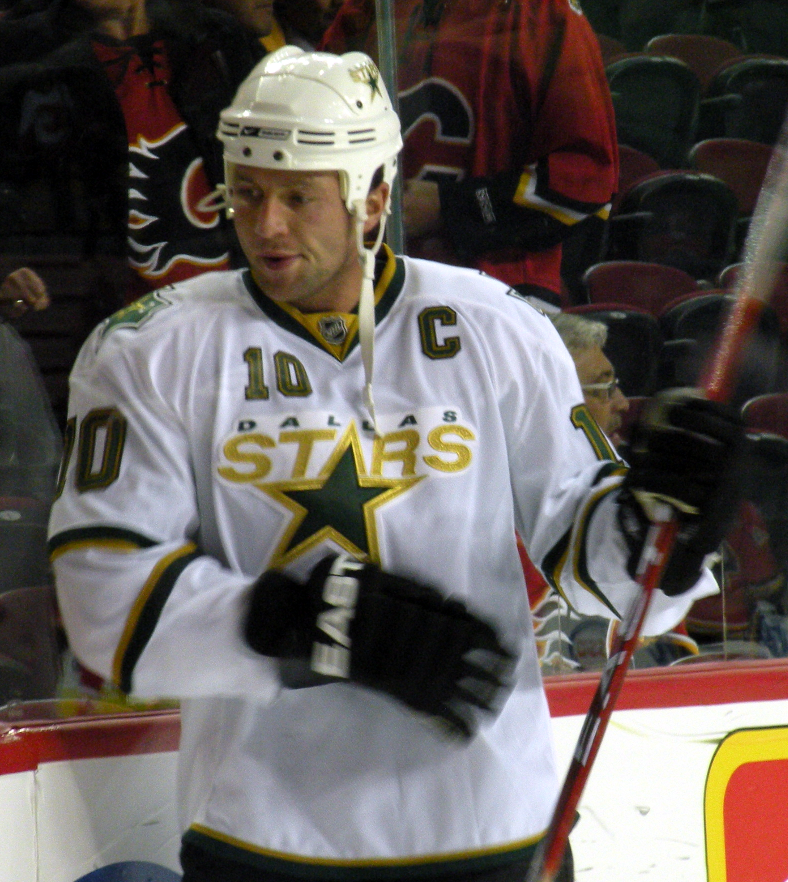
Brenden Morrow

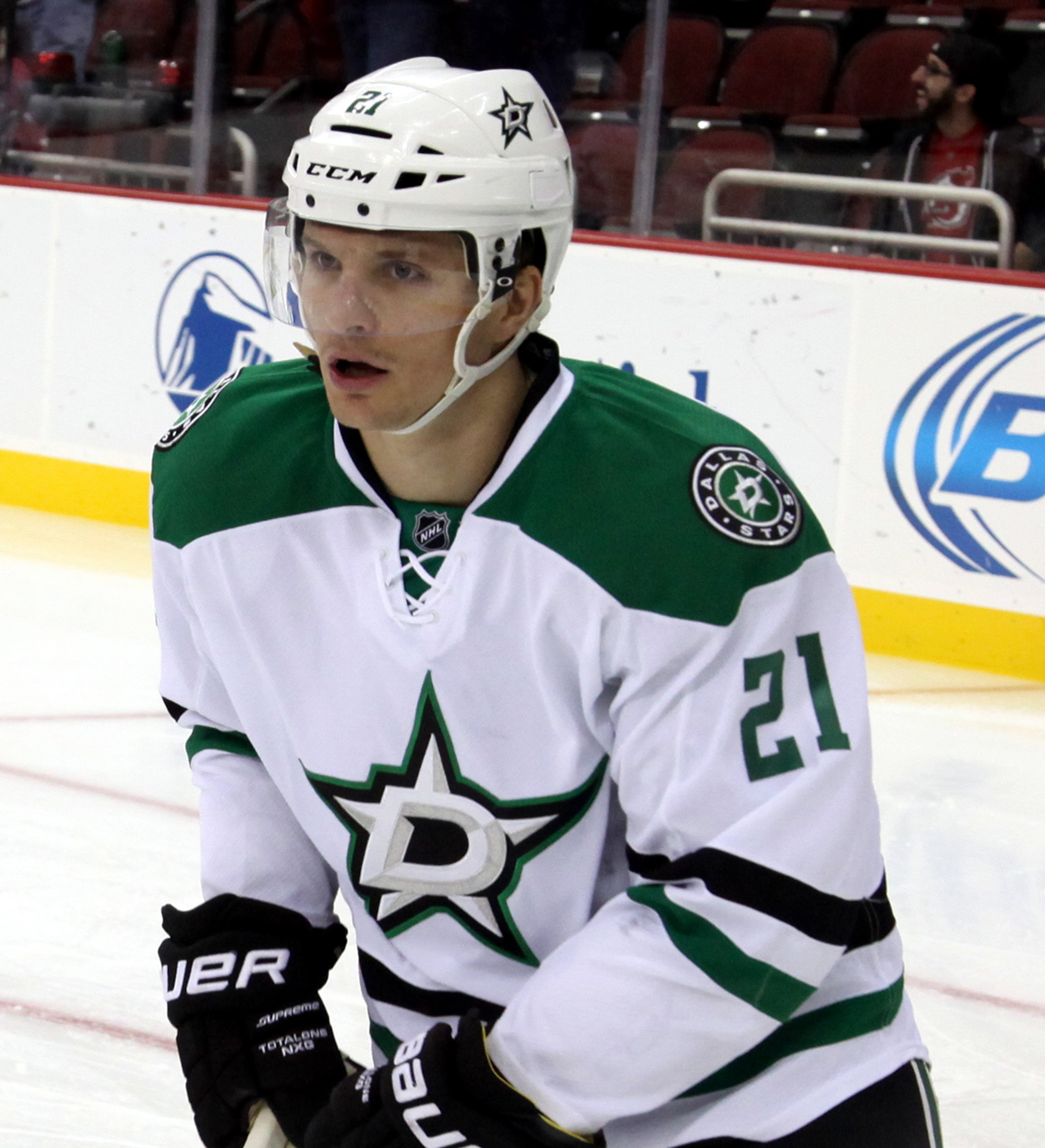
Antoine Roussel

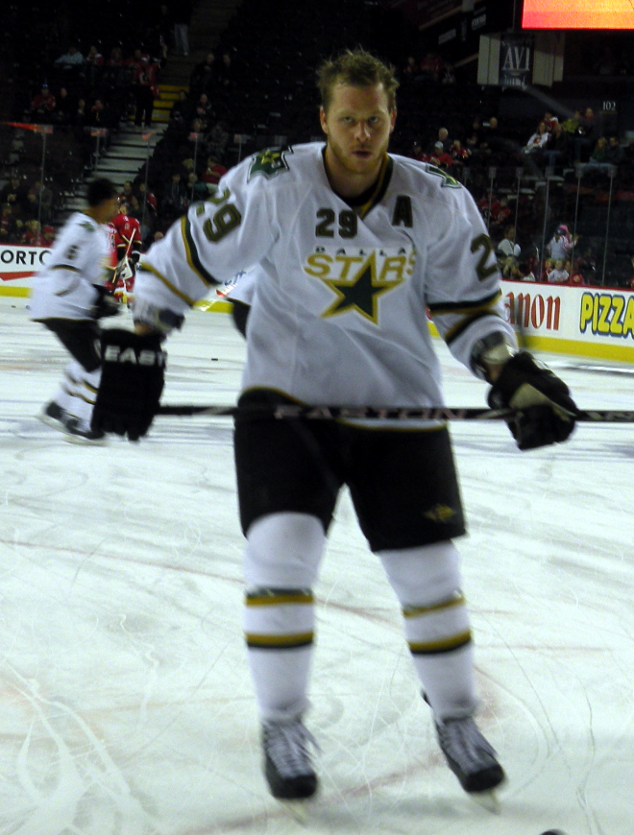
Steve Ott

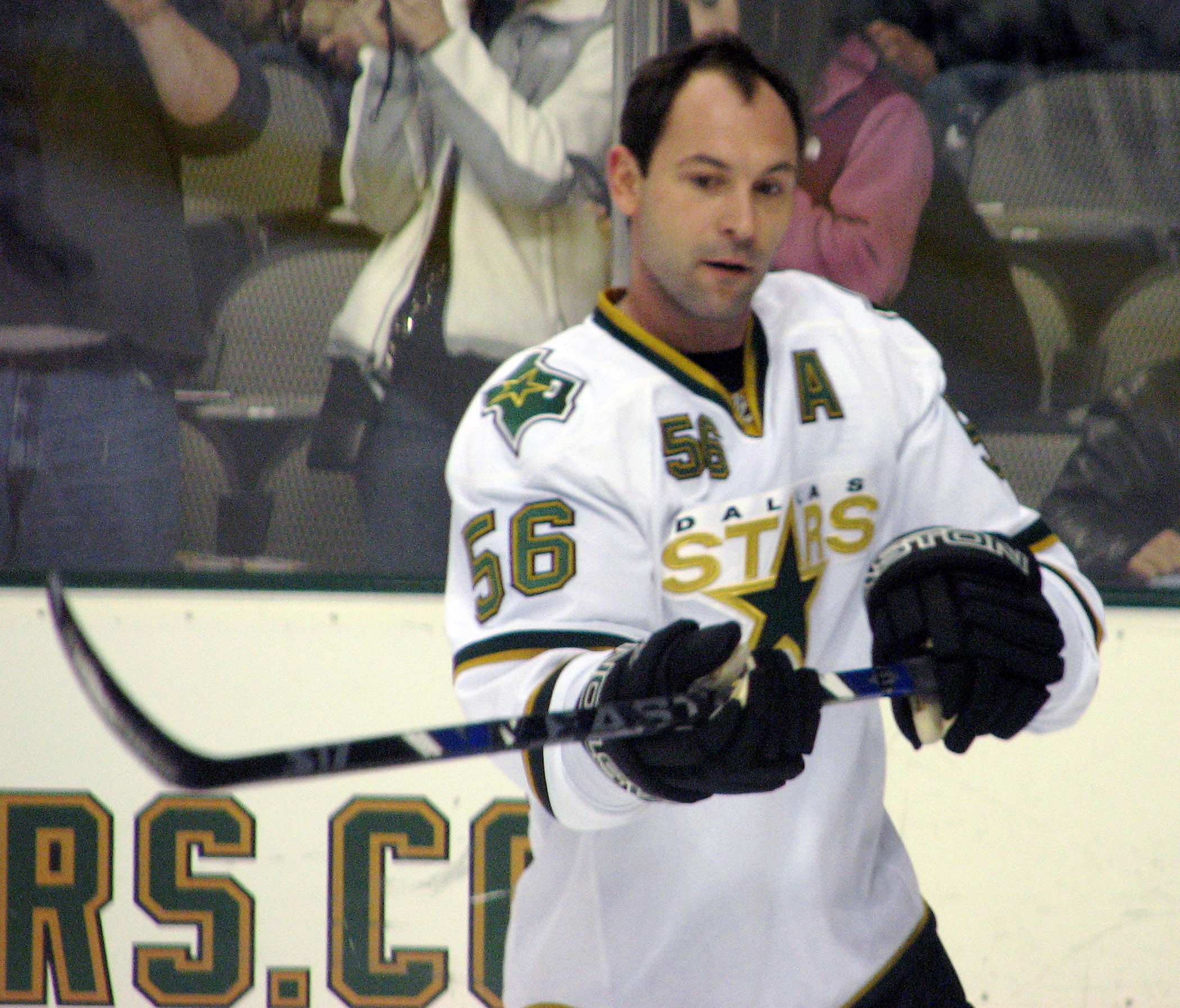
Sergei Zubov

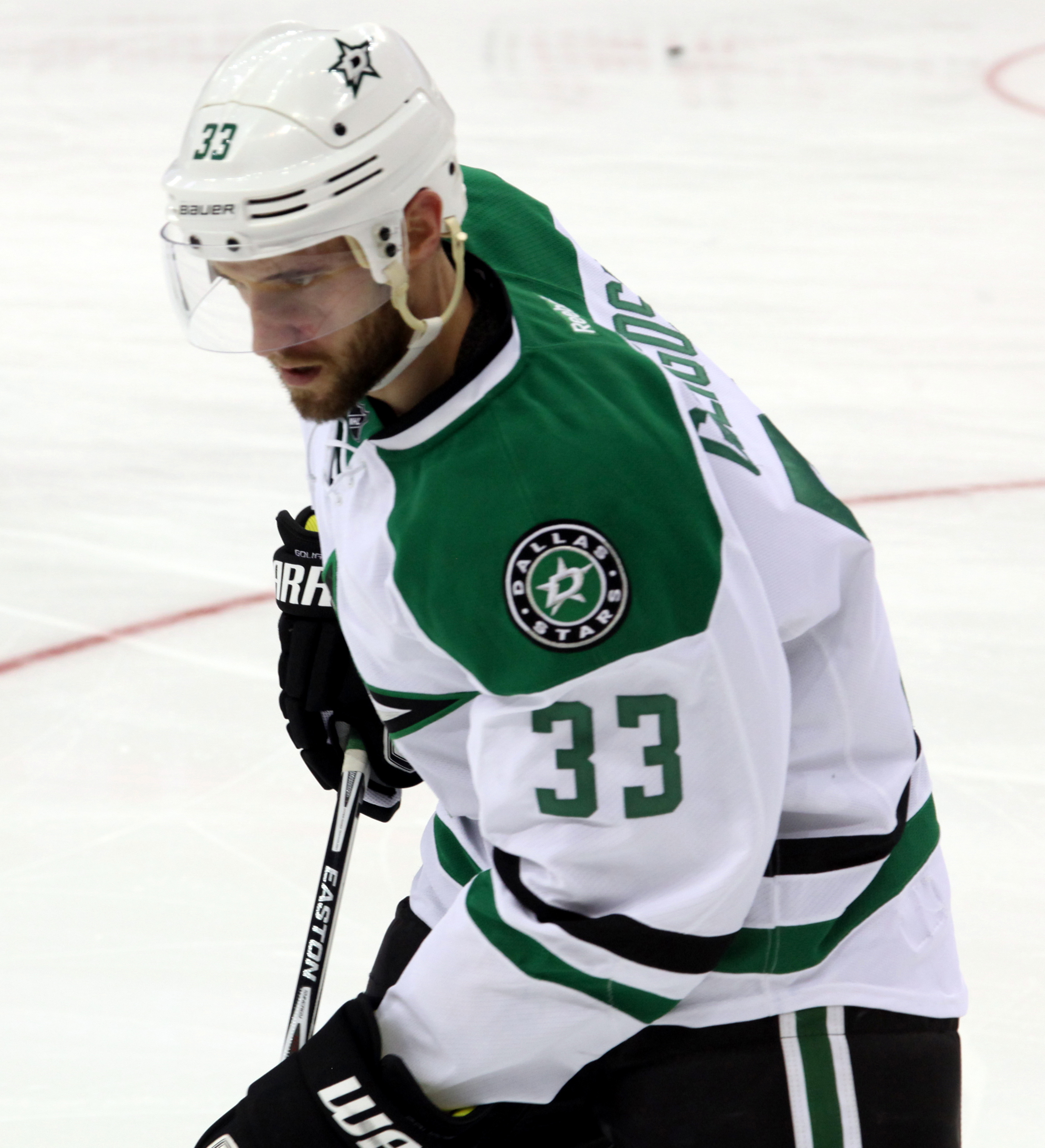
Alex Goligoski

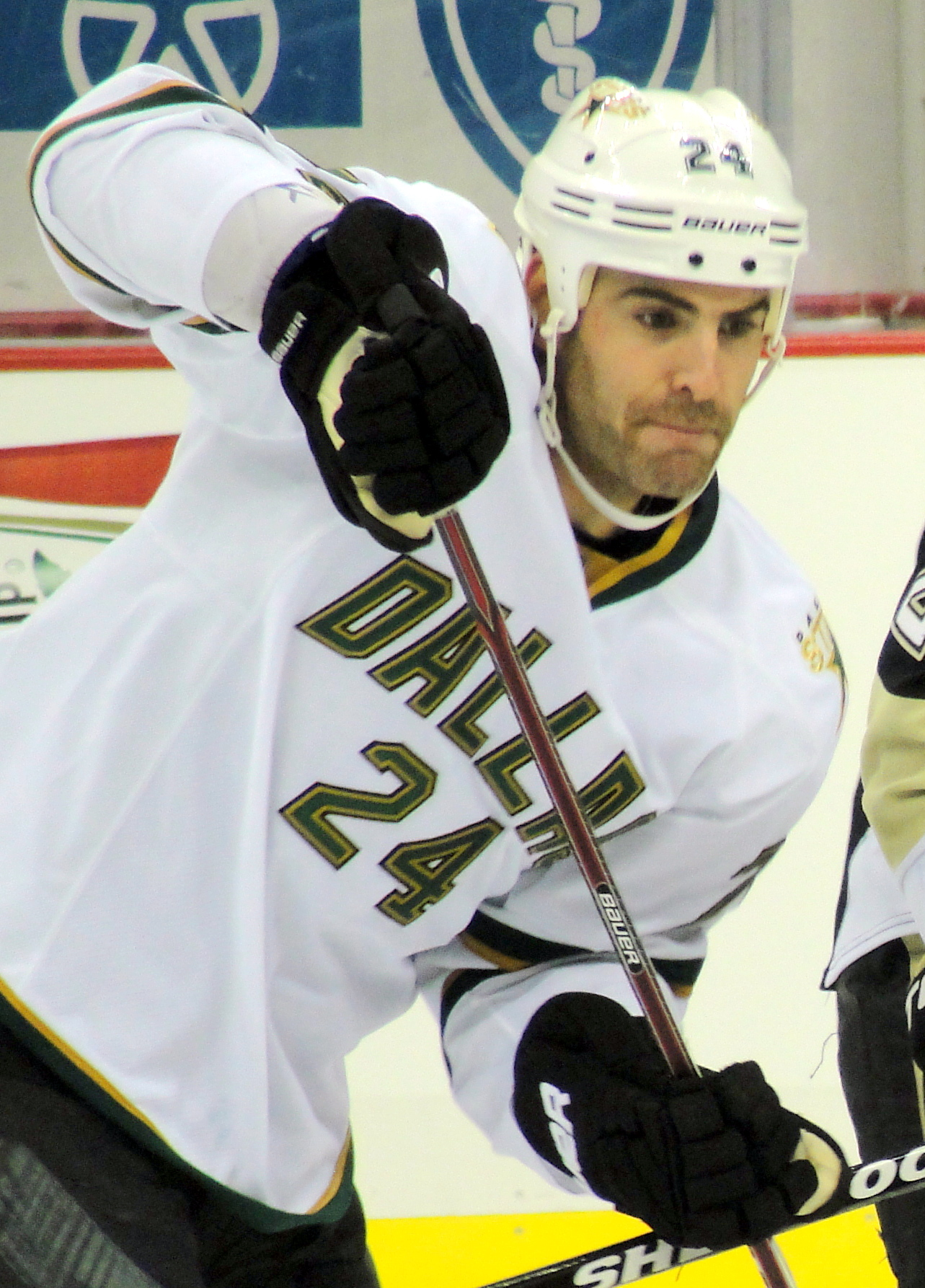
Eric Nystrom

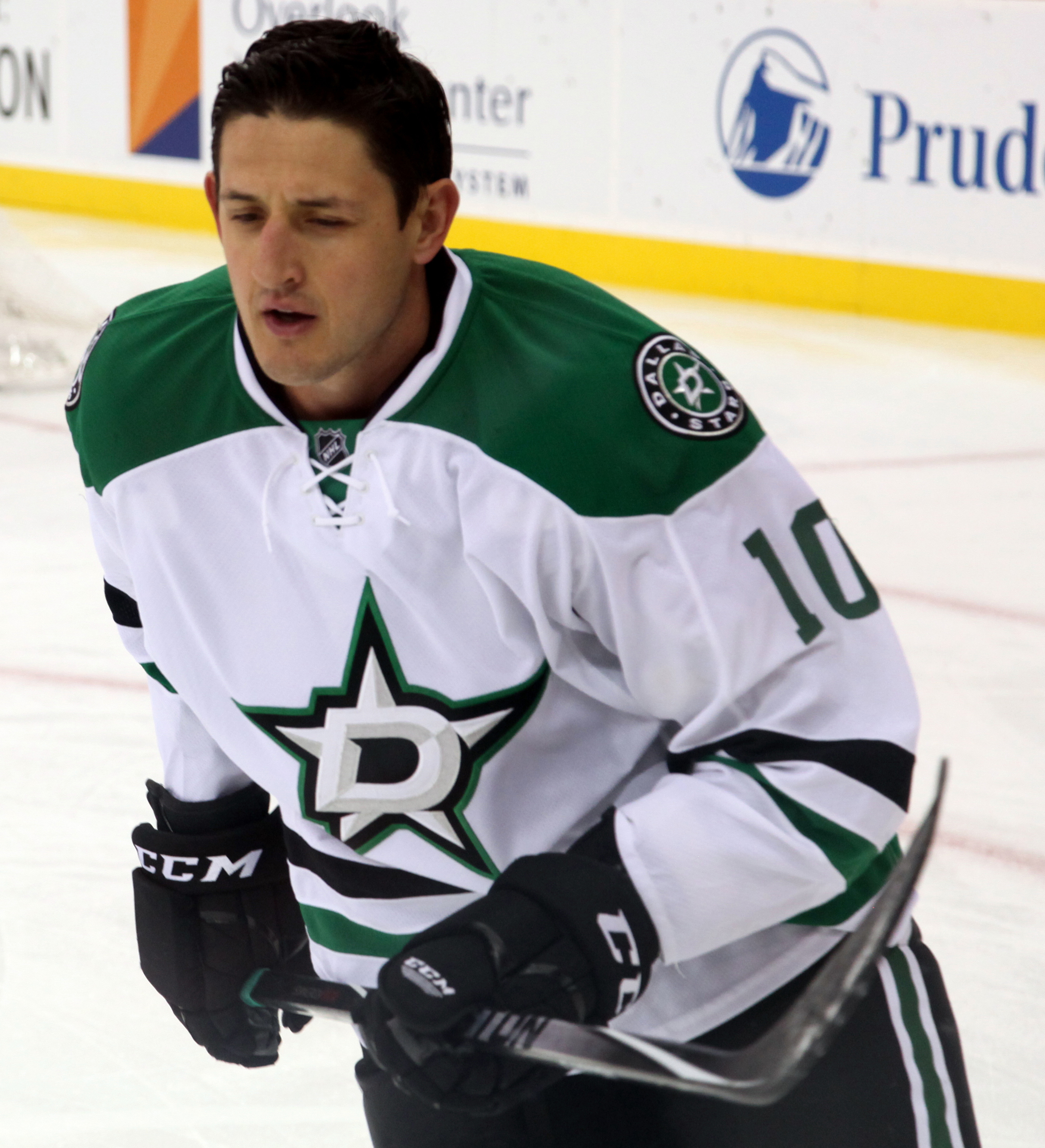
Shawn Horcoff

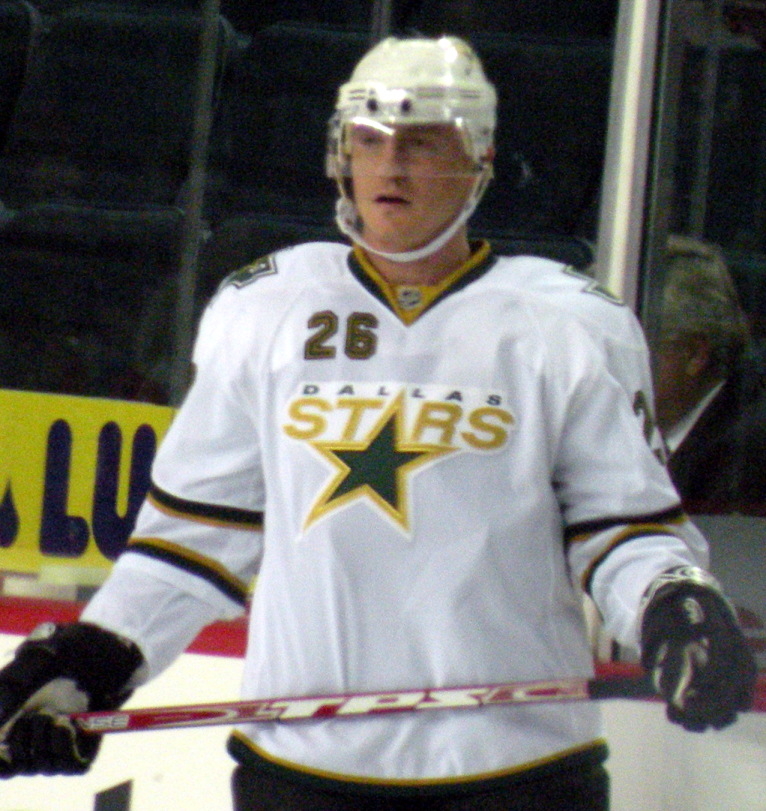
Jere Lehtinen

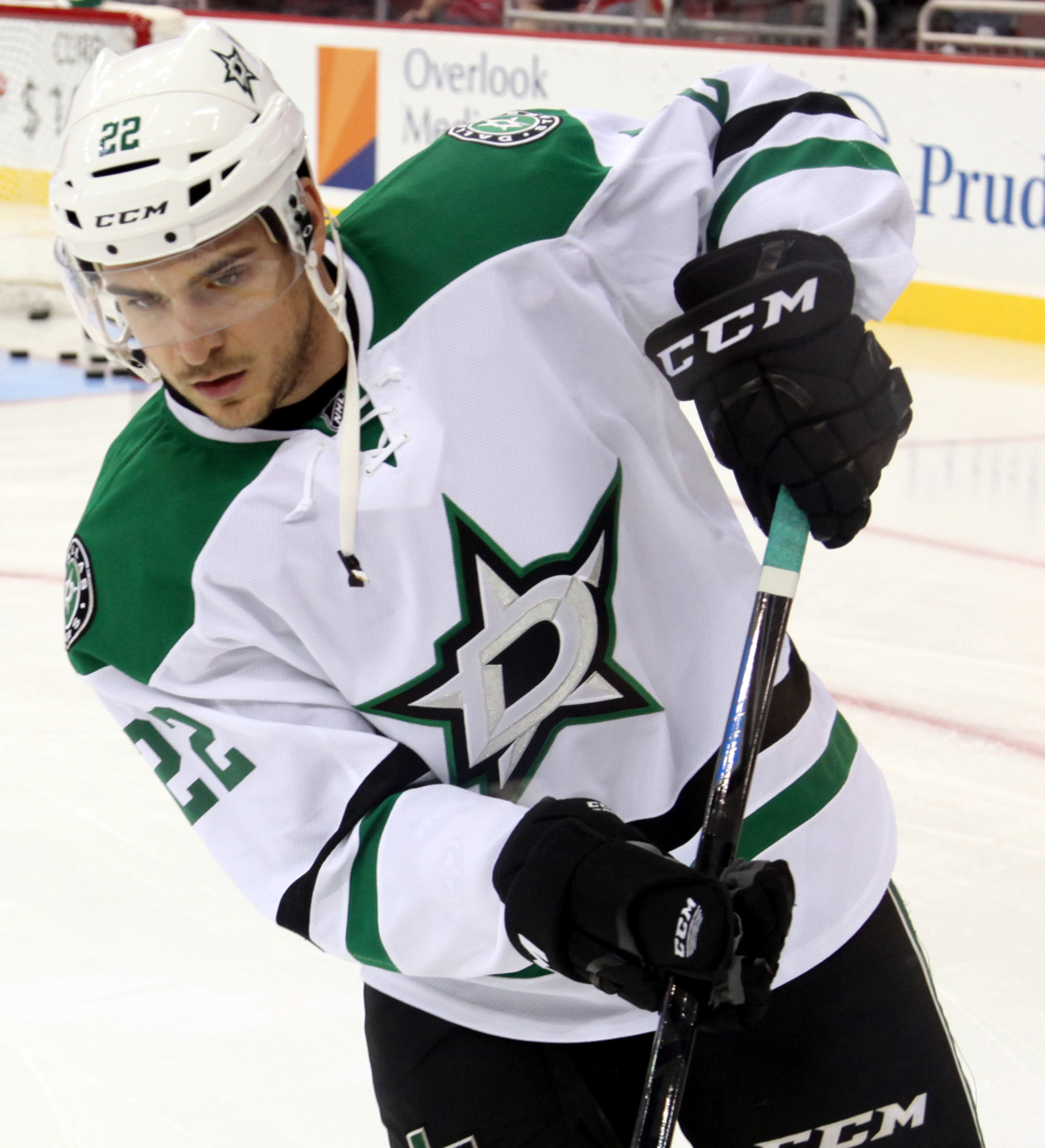
Colton Sceviour

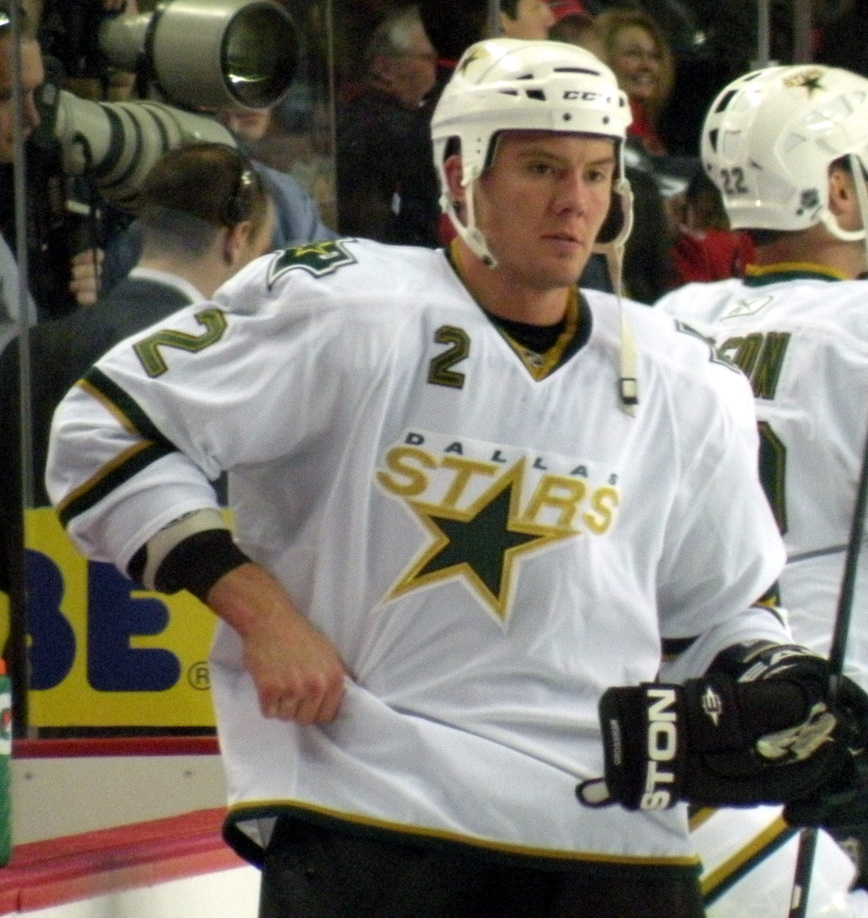
Nicklas Grossmann

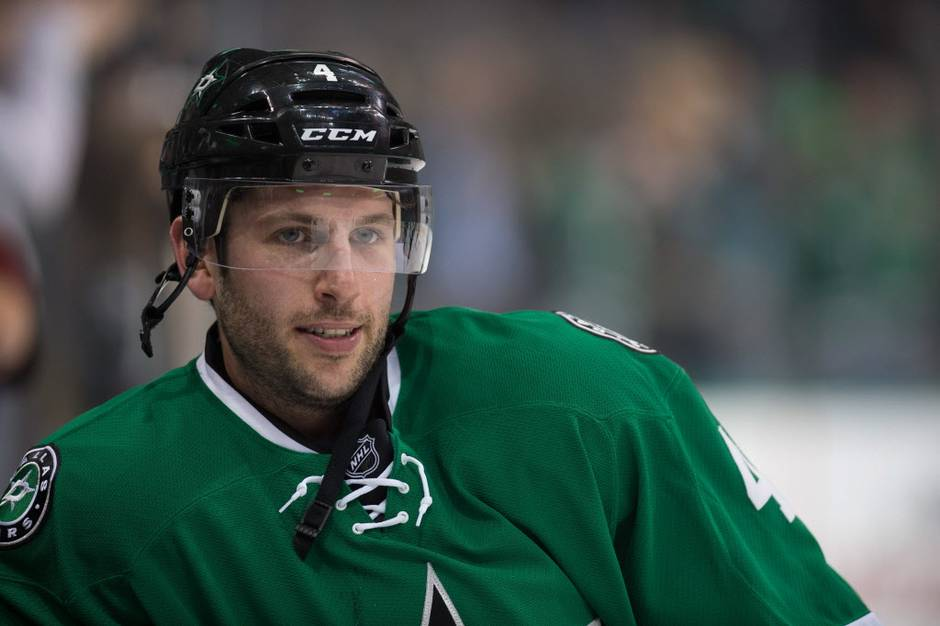
Jason Demers

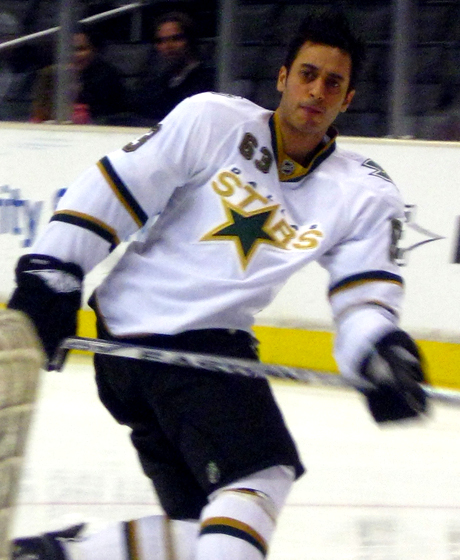
Mike Ribeiro

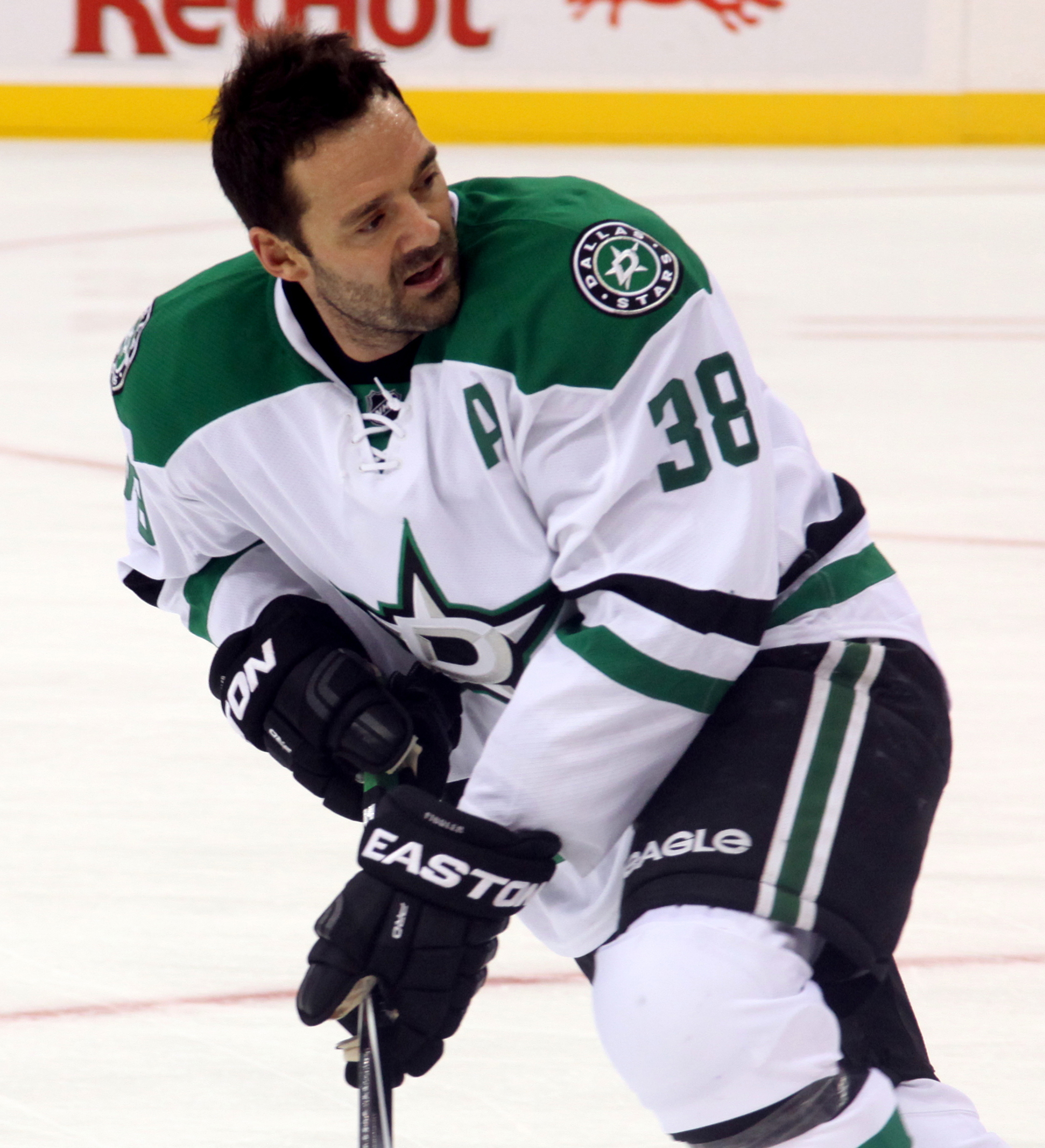
Vernon Fiddler

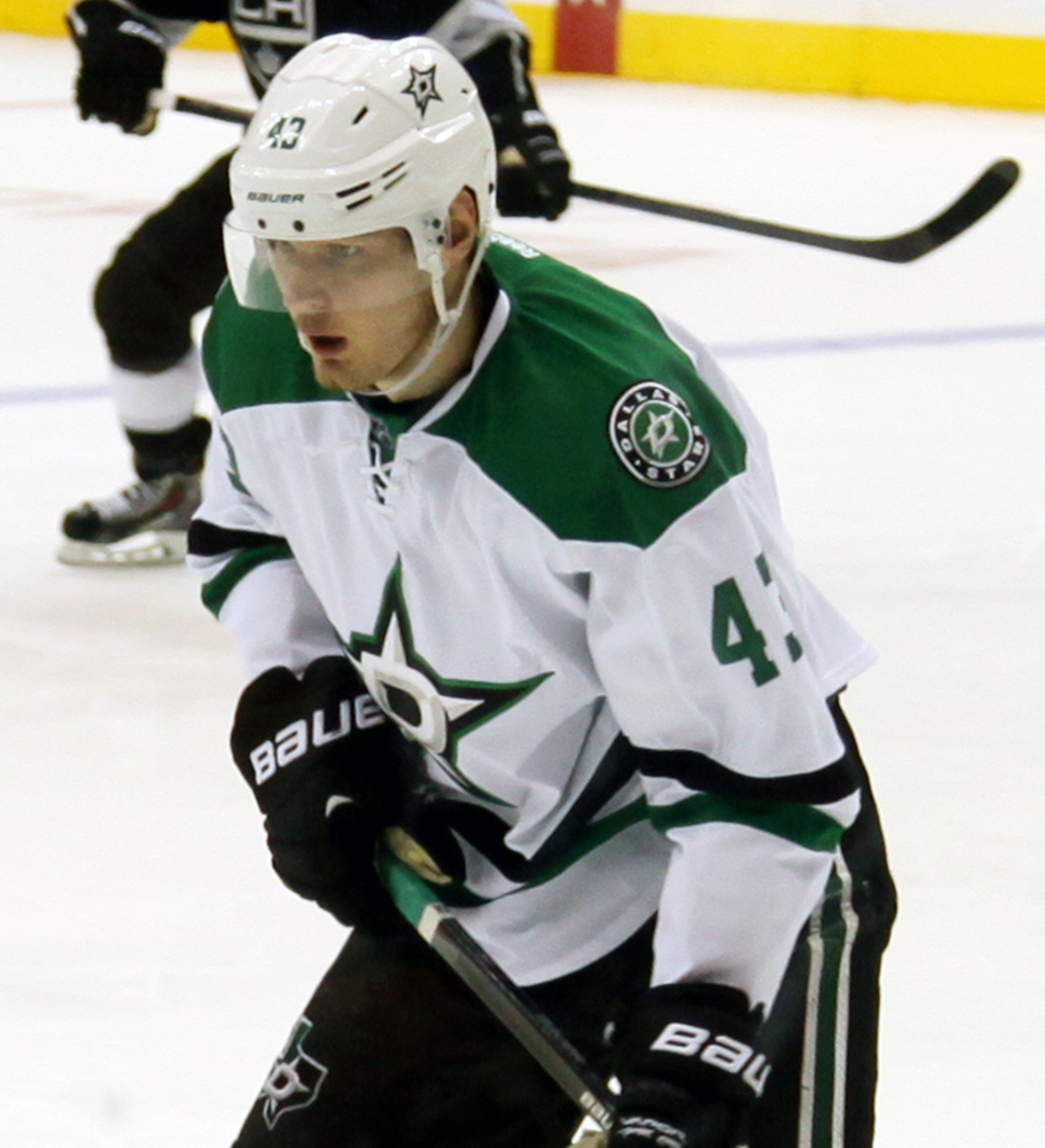
Valeri Nichushkin

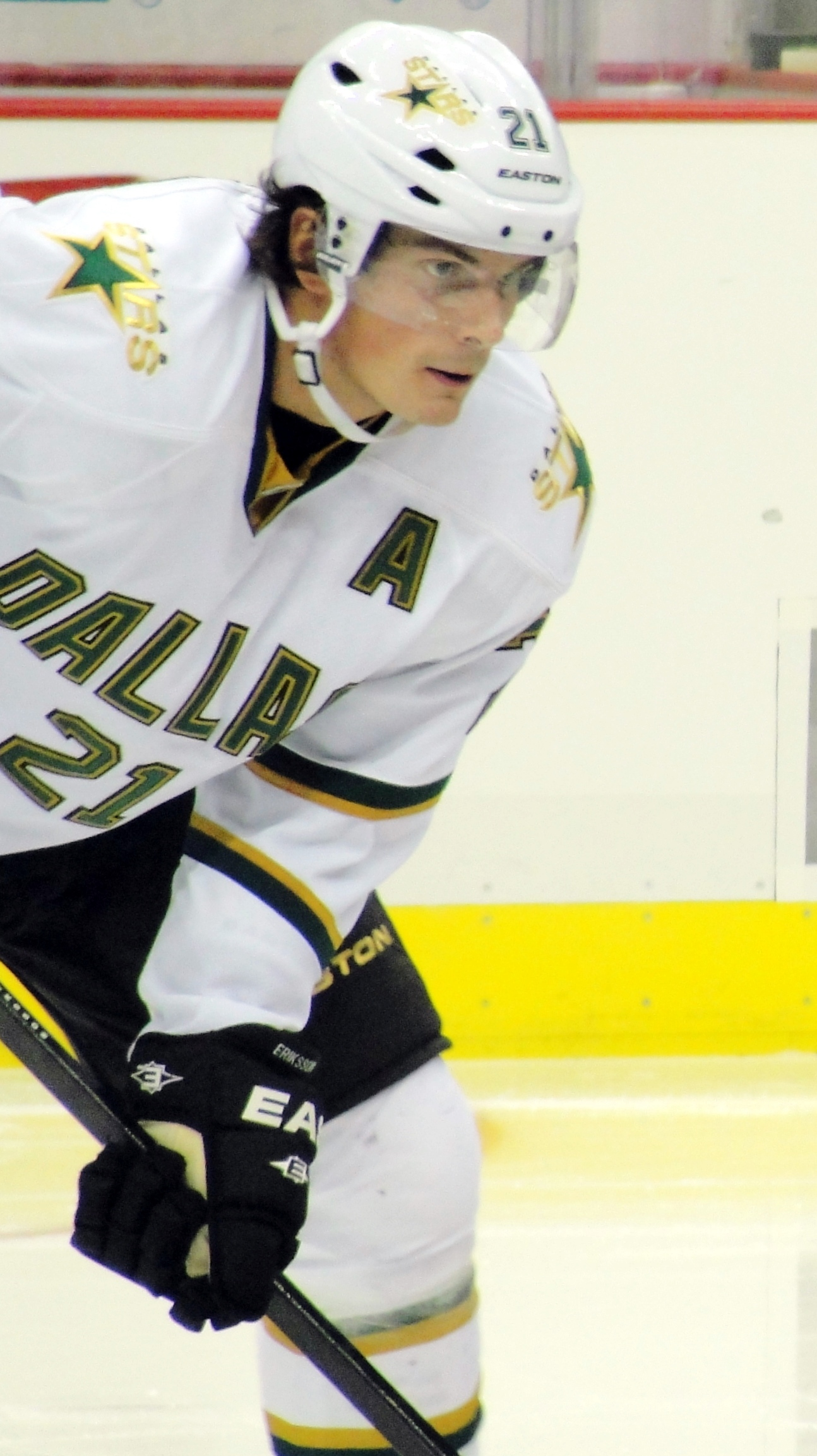
Loui Eriksson

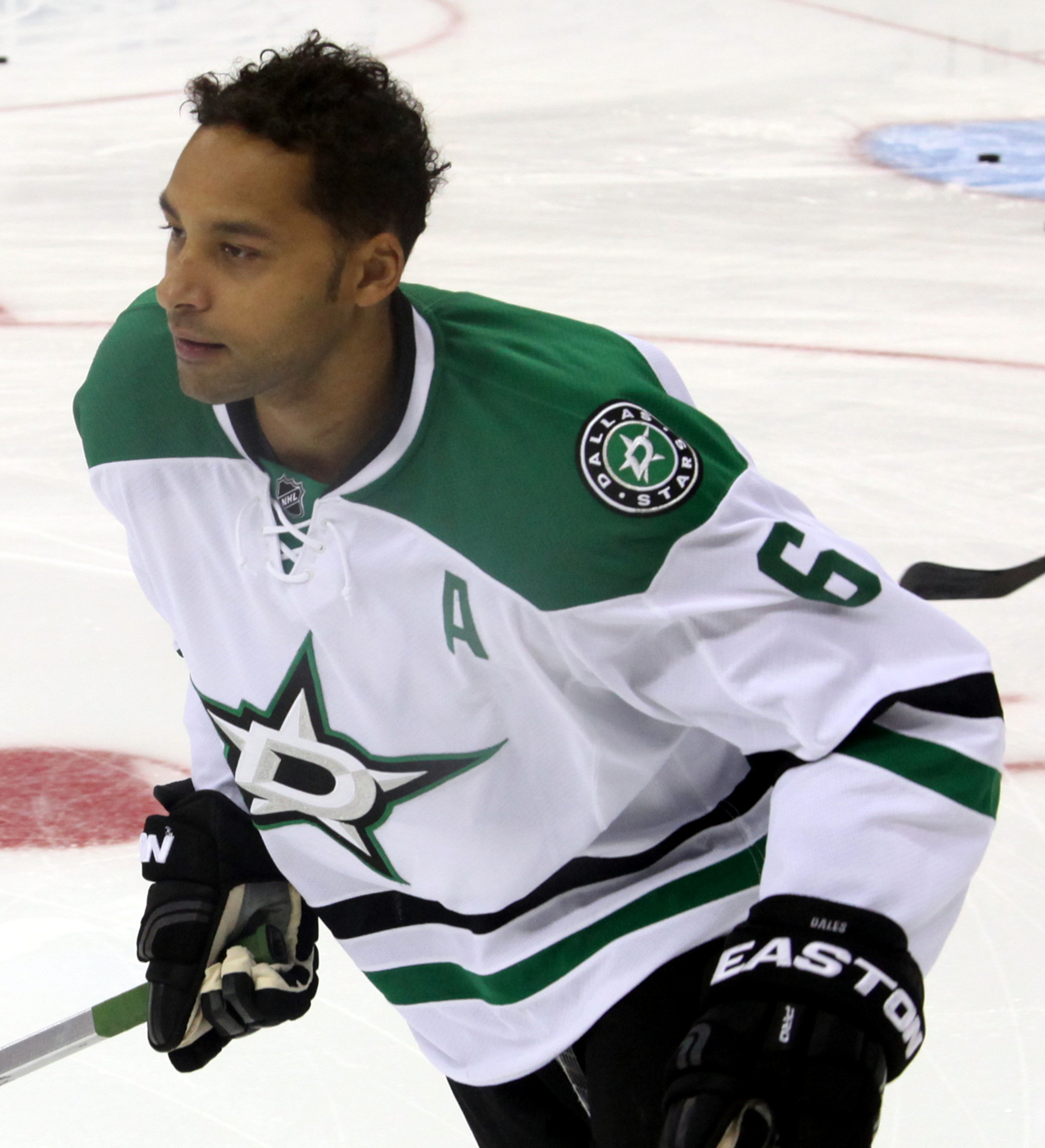
Trevor Daley

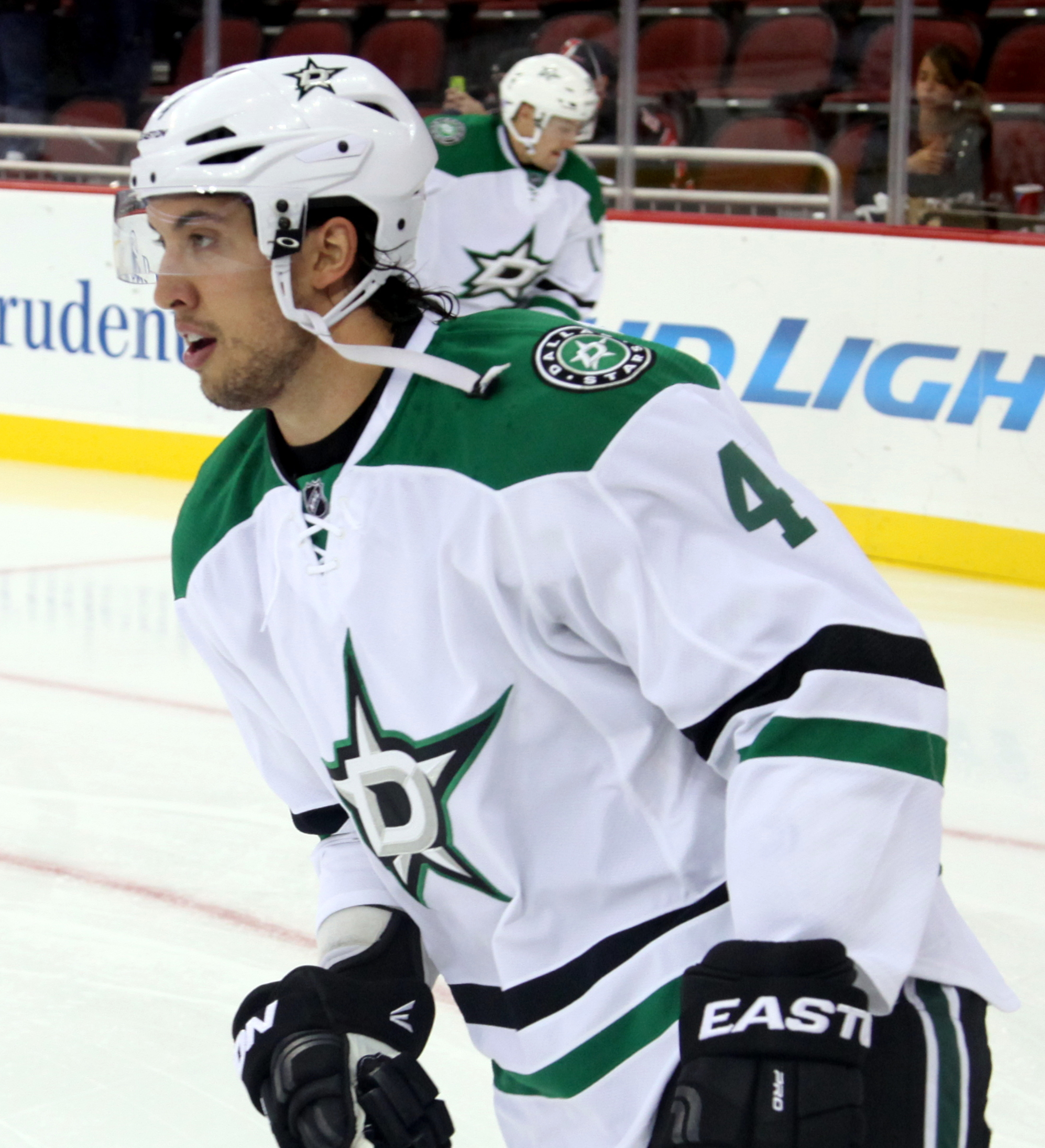
Brenden Dillon

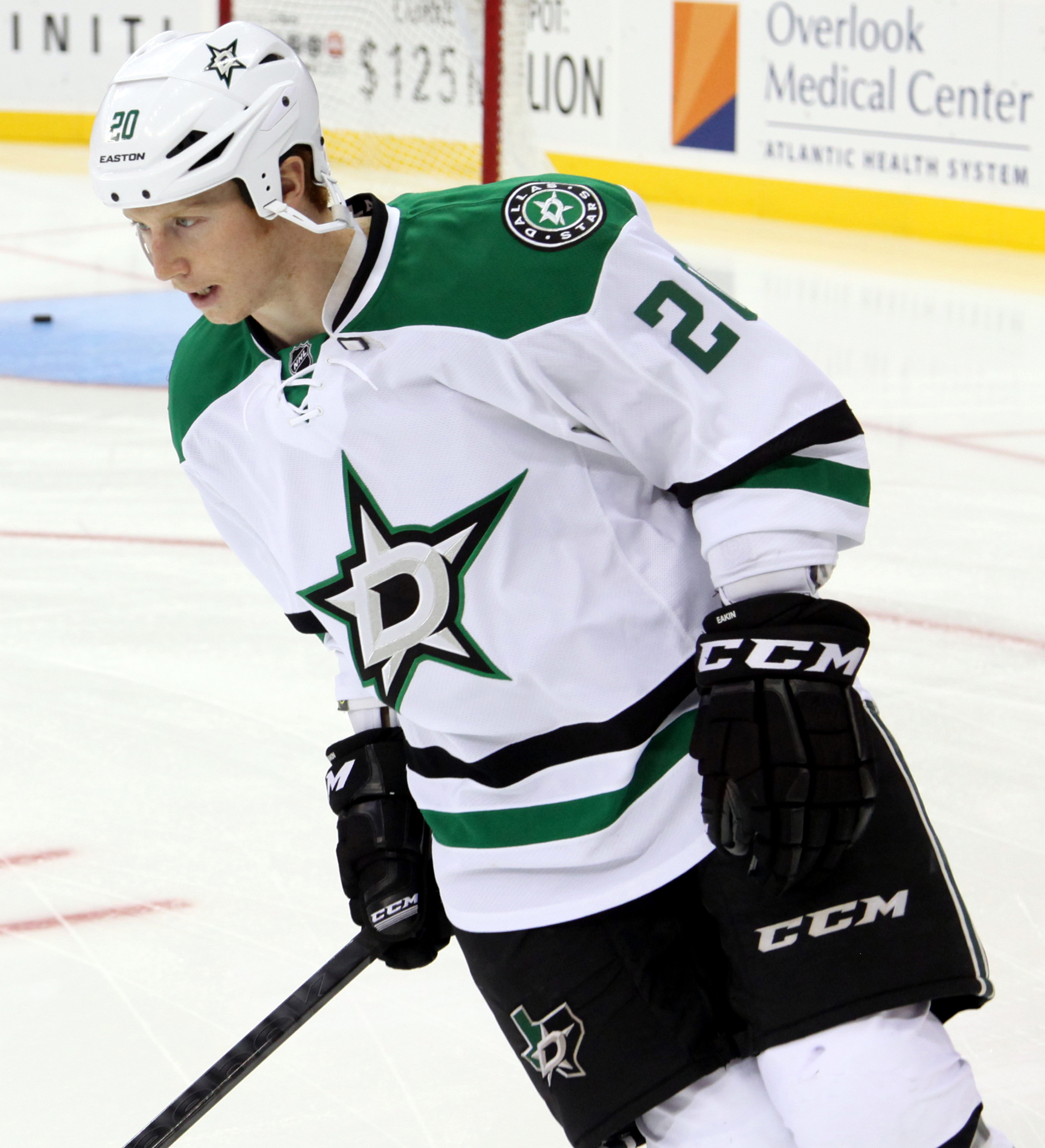
Cody Eakin

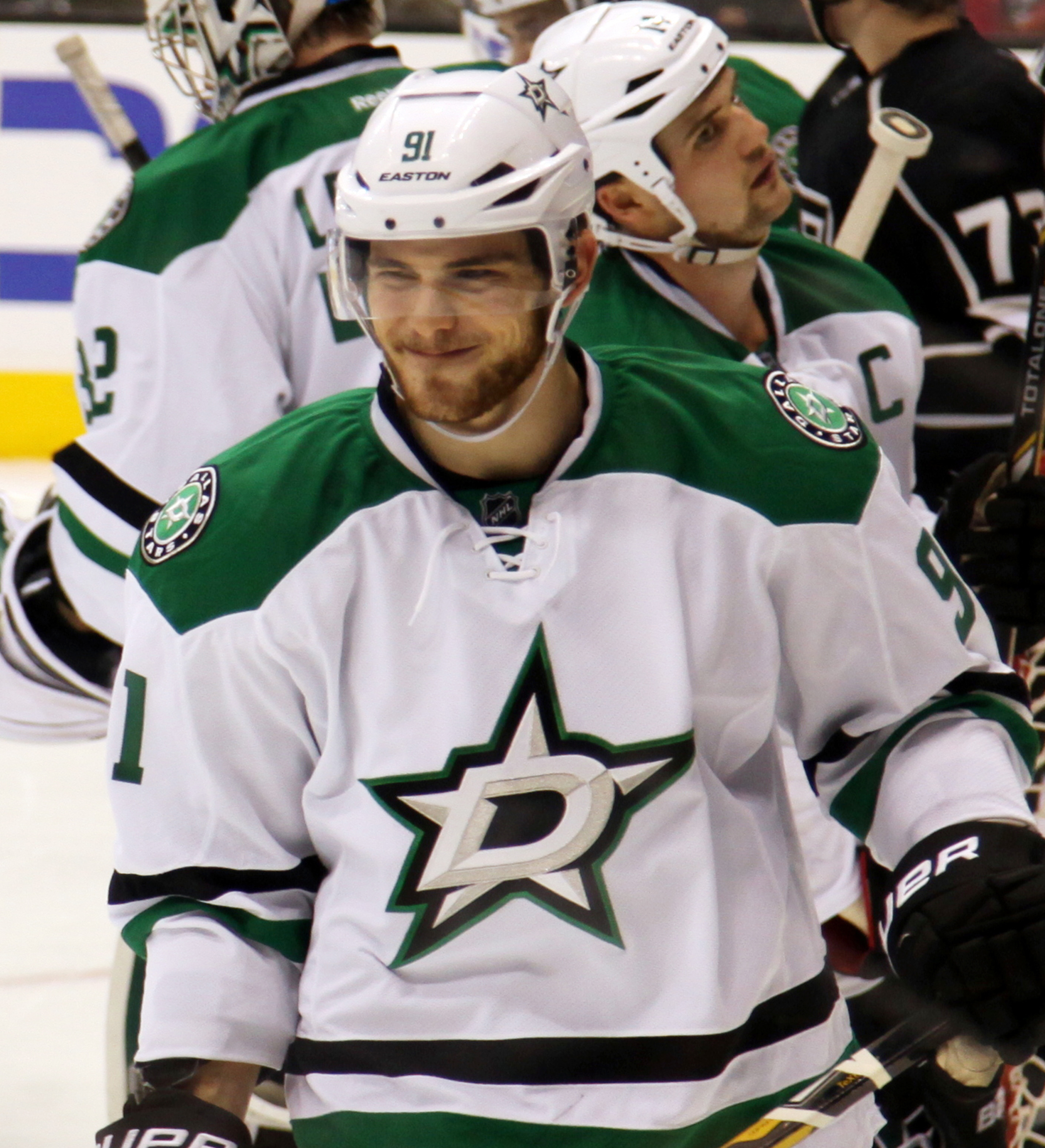
Tyler Seguin

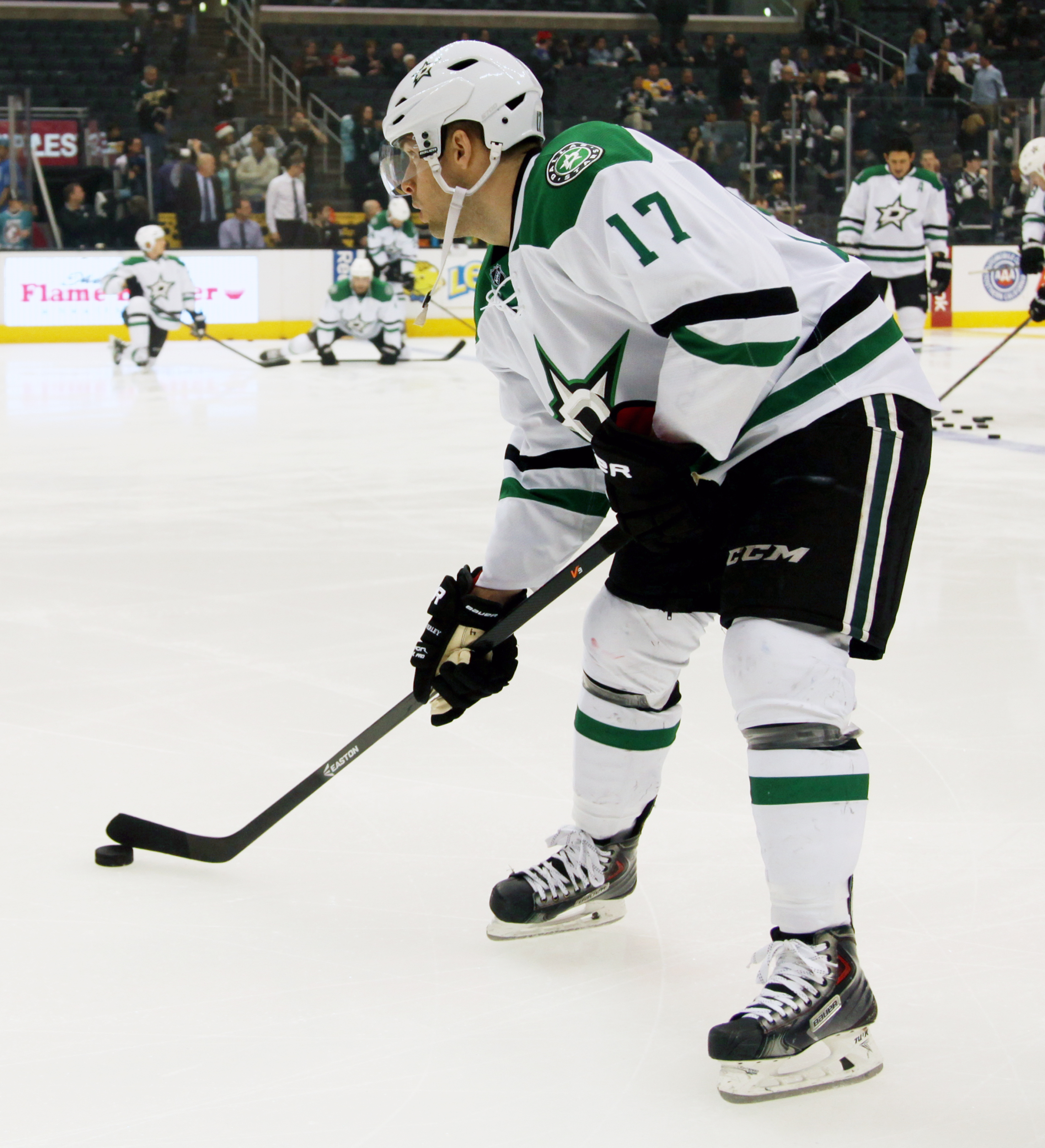
Rich Peverley

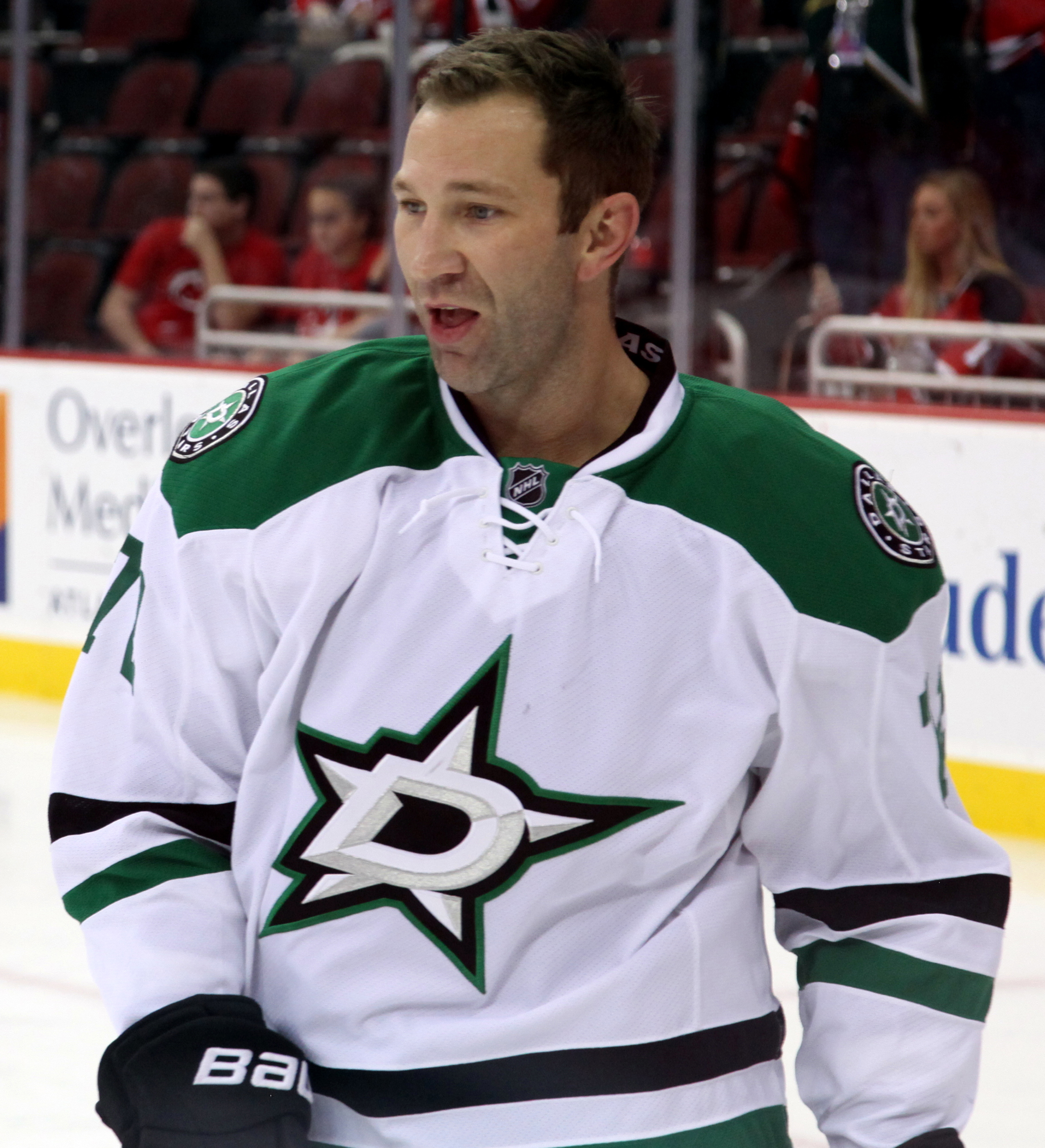
Erik Cole

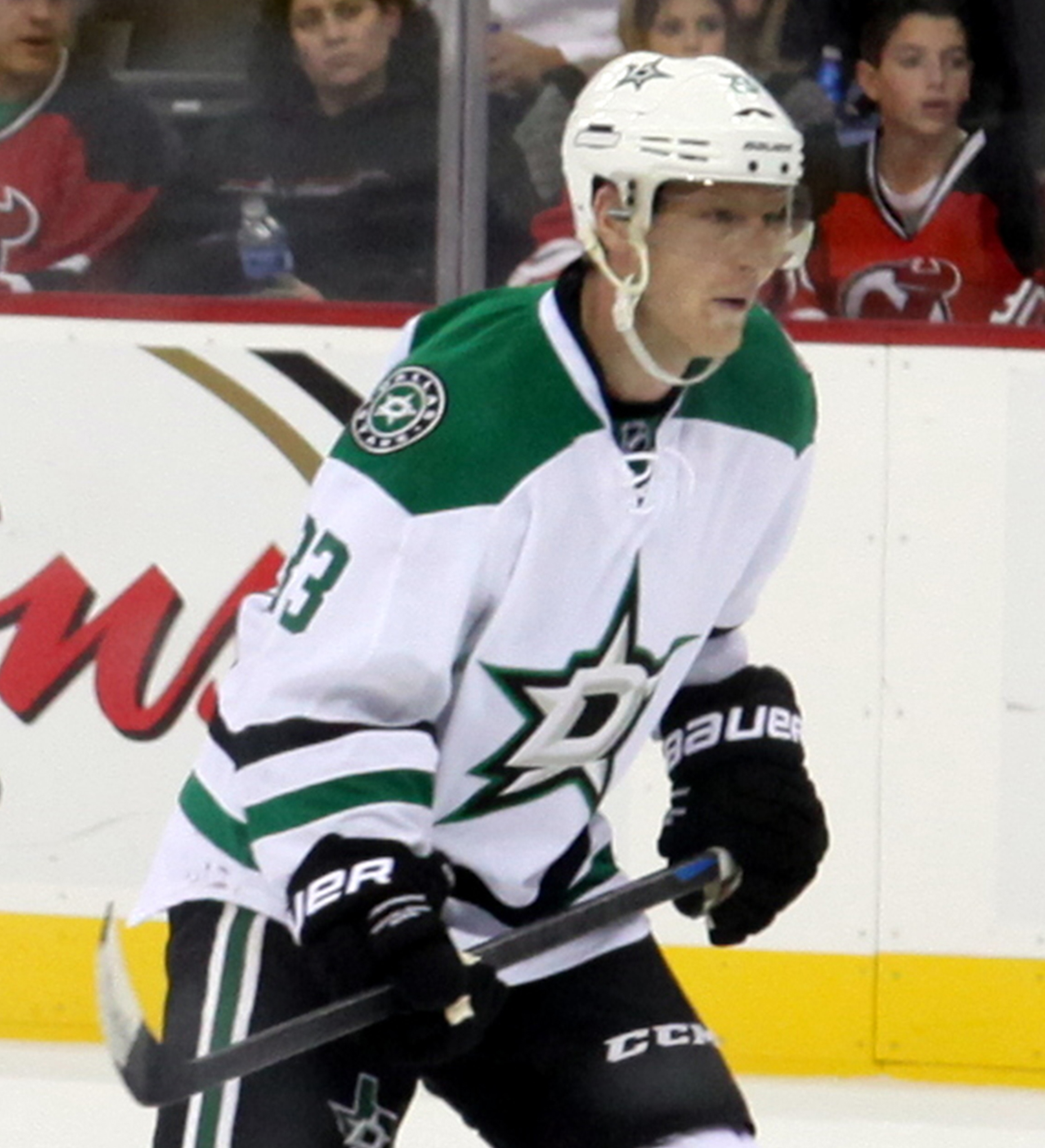
Ales Hemsky

Name	Nationality	Pos	Seasons	GP	G	A	P	PIM	GP	G	A	P	PIM	Notes
Name	Nationality	Pos	Seasons	Regular season					Playoffs					Notes
Greg Adams	Canada	LW	1994–1998	177	60	57	117	59	20	4	3	7	0	
Keith Aldridge	United States	D	1999–2000	4	0	0	0	0	–	–	–	–	–	
Jason Arnott	Canada	C	2001–2006	236	79	105	184	225	21	4	6	10	12	
Donald Audette	Canada	RW	2001–2002	20	4	8	12	12	–	–	–	–	–	
Sean Avery	Canada	C	2008–2009	23	3	7	10	77	–	–	–	–	–	
Oskar Bäck*	Sweden	C	2024–2026	145	9	19	28	18	17	0	3	3	2	
Krys Barch	Canada	RW	2006–2012	263	10	16	26	578	3	0	0	0	2	
Matthew Barnaby	Canada	RW	2006–2007	39	1	6	7	127	–	–	–	–	–	
Stu Barnes	Canada	C	2002–2008	329	53	67	120	136	38	6	8	14	6	
Dave Barr	Canada	RW	1993–1994	20	2	5	7	21	3	0	1	1	4	
Bob Bassen	Canada	C	1995–1998	117	8	12	20	113	24	4	1	5	16	
Nathan Bastian*	Canada	RW	2025–2026	36	6	1	7	21	–	–	–	–	–	
Nolan Baumgartner	Canada	D	2006–2007	7	0	2	2	0	–	–	–	–	–	
Gavin Bayreuther	United States	D	2018–2019	19	2	3	5	10	–	–	–	–	–	
Steve Begin	Canada	C	2008–2009	20	1	1	2	15	–	–	–	–	–	
Jamie Benn*	Canada	LW	2009–2026	1252	414	578	992	932	126	28	52	80	153	Captain 2013–Present
Jordie Benn	Canada	D	2011–2017	302	11	60	71	119	7	0	3	3	6	
Brad Berry	Canada	D	1993–1994	8	0	0	0	12	–	–	–	–	–	
Lian Bichsel*	Switzerland	D	2024–2026	88	8	9	17	78	24	0	1	1	32	
James Black	Canada	LW	1993–1994	13	2	3	5	2	–	–	–	–	–	
Colin Blackwell*	United States	C	2024–2026	133	10	22	32	56	17	1	0	1	6	
Matěj Blümel	Czech Republic	RW	2022–2025	13	2	0	2	0	–	–	–	–	–	
Nikolai Borschevsky	Russia	RW	1995–1996	12	1	3	4	6	–	–	–	–	–	
Jason Botterill	Canada	LW	1997–1999	21	0	0	0	42	–	–	–	–	–	
Joel Bouchard	Canada	D	1999–2000	2	0	0	0	2	–	–	–	–	–	
Philippe Boucher	Canada	D	2002–2009	346	52	110	162	380	31	2	4	6	29	
Tyler Bouck	Canada	C	2000–2001	48	2	5	7	29	1	0	0	0	0	
Mavrik Bourque*	Canada	C	2023–2026	156	31	35	66	30	10	1	0	1	6	
Zac Boyer	Canada	RW	1994–1996	3	0	0	0	0	2	0	0	0	0	
Neil Brady	Canada	C	1993–1994	5	0	1	1	21	–	–	–	–	–	
Neal Broten	United States	C	1993–1995; 1996–1997	116	25	46	71	78	11	2	2	4	6	Captain 1995; Ret #7
Paul Broten	United States	RW	1993–1995	111	19	21	40	66	14	2	3	5	4	
Rob Brown	Canada	RW	1993–1994	1	0	0	0	0	–	–	–	–	–	
Benoit Brunet	Canada	LW	2001–2002	32	4	9	13	8	–	–	–	–	–	
Fabian Brunnstrom	Sweden	LW	2008–2010	99	19	21	40	18	–	–	–	–	–	
Michael Bunting*	Canada	LW	2025–2026	13	1	1	2	4	1	0	1	1	0	
Valeri Bure	Russia	RW	2003–2004	13	2	5	7	6	5	0	3	3	0	
Adam Burish	United States	RW	2010–2012	128	14	19	33	167	–	–	–	–	–	
Petr Buzek	Czech Republic	D	1997–1999	4	0	0	0	4	–	–	–	–	–	
Nick Caamano	Canada	RW	2019–2021	36	1	2	3	21	4	0	0	0	0	
Kyle Capobianco*	Canada	D	2024–2026	34	2	3	5	12	–	–	–	–	–	
Guy Carbonneau†	Canada	C	1995–2000	364	34	66	100	181	63	7	10	17	30	SC 1999
Connor Carrick	United States	D	2018–2019	14	1	3	4	13	–	–	–	–	–	
Paul Cavallini	Canada	D	1993–1996	126	12	44	56	116	14	1	10	11	10	
Cody Ceci	Canada	D	2024–2025	31	0	9	9	10	18	0	3	3	2	
Shawn Chambers†	United States	D	1997–2000	122	4	31	35	48	31	0	5	5	38	SC 1999
Alex Chiasson	United States	RW	2012–2014	86	19	23	42	38	6	1	1	2	2	
Ryan Christie	Canada	LW	1999–2000	5	0	0	0	0	–	–	–	–	–	
Shane Churla	Canada	RW	1993–1996	130	10	14	24	687	14	1	3	4	55	
Andrew Cogliano	Canada	LW	2018–2021	154	11	20	31	62	36	2	2	4	14	
Erik Cole	United States	LW	2012–2015	160	40	29	69	44	3	0	0	0	2	
Blake Comeau	Canada	RW	2018–2022	189	20	29	49	119	36	3	6	9	46	
Erik Condra	United States	RW	2018–2019	6	1	0	1	2	–	–	–	–	–	
Kevin Connauton	Canada	D	2013–2015	44	1	9	10	22	4	0	0	0	16	
Chris Conner	United States	RW	2006–2009	71	7	14	21	20	1	0	0	0	0	
Shayne Corson	Canada	LW	2003–2004	17	5	5	10	29	5	0	1	1	12	
Patrick Cote	Canada	LW	1995–1998	8	0	0	0	47	–	–	–	–	–	
Sylvain Cote	Canada	D	1999–2000	28	2	8	10	14	23	2	1	3	8	
Russ Courtnall	Canada	RW	1993–1995	116	30	67	97	72	9	1	8	9	0	
Adam Cracknell	Canada	RW	2016–2018	70	10	6	16	12	–	–	–	–	–	
Mike Craig	Canada	RW	1993–1994	72	13	24	37	139	4	0	0	0	2	
B. J. Crombeen	United States	RW	2007–2009	23	1	6	7	65	5	0	0	0	0	
Evgenii Dadonov	Russia	RW	2022–2025	154	35	43	78	29	51	8	13	21	6	
Ulf Dahlen	Sweden	LW	1993–1994; 2002–2003	128	36	58	94	24	11	1	3	4	0	
Trevor Daley	Canada	D	2003–2015	756	67	164	231	509	35	4	3	7	40	
Riley Damiani	Canada	C	2021–2022	7	1	1	2	2	–	–	–	–	–	
Kevin Dean	United States	D	1999–2000	14	0	0	0	10	–	–	–	–	–	
Ty Dellandrea	Canada	C	2020–2024	151	14	28	42	100	22	4	0	4	24	
Jason Demers	Canada	D	2014–2016	123	12	33	45	135	13	0	3	3	8	
Jason Dickinson	Canada	C	2015–2021	221	25	38	63	64	40	5	4	9	12	
Gerald Diduck	Canada	D	2000–2001	14	0	0	0	18	–	–	–	–	–	
Brenden Dillon	Canada	D	2011–2015	149	9	17	26	174	2	0	0	0	2	
Rob DiMaio	Canada	RW	2001–2004	199	25	30	55	153	17	1	5	6	12	
Max Domi	Canada	LW	2022–2023	20	2	5	7	6	19	3	10	13	52	
Ted Donato	United States	LW	2000–2001	65	8	17	25	26	8	0	1	1	0	
Gord Donnelly	Canada	D	1993–1995	34	1	1	2	118	–	–	–	–	–	
Mike Donnelly	United States	LW	1994–1996	59	13	19	32	39	5	0	1	1	6	
Peter Douris	Canada	RW	1997–1998	1	0	0	0	0	–	–	–	–	–	
Jake Dowell	United States	C	2011–2012	52	2	5	7	53	–	–	–	–	–	
Justin Dowling	Canada	C	2016–2017; 2018–2021	76	4	10	14	16	15	0	2	2	0	
Aaron Downey	Canada	RW	2002–2004	80	2	2	4	146	–	–	–	–	–	
Matt Duchene*	Canada	C	2023–2026	219	71	121	192	40	43	5	16	21	16	
Mathew Dumba	Canada	D	2024–2025	61	1	9	10	60	–	–	–	–	–	
Radek Dvorak	Czech Republic	RW	2011–2012	73	4	17	21	12	–	–	–	–	–	
Cody Eakin	Canada	C	2012–2017	349	61	85	146	184	19	3	10	13	8	
Patrick Eaves	Canada	RW	2014–2017	160	46	35	81	51	9	3	3	6	2	
Pelle Eklund	Sweden	C	1993–1994	5	2	1	3	2	9	0	3	3	4	
Remi Elie	Canada	LW	2016–2018	90	7	14	21	26	–	–	–	–	–	
Loui Eriksson	Sweden	LW	2006–2013	501	150	207	357	114	22	4	5	9	8	
Adam Erne*	United States	LW	2025–2026	45	6	2	8	19	1	0	0	0	0	
Bob Errey	Canada	LW	1997–1998	59	2	9	11	46	–	–	–	–	–	
John Erskine	Canada	D	2001–2006	107	2	2	4	237	–	–	–	–	–	
Dean Evason	Canada	C	1993–1995	127	19	40	59	114	14	1	4	5	24	
Radek Faksa*	Czech Republic	C	2015–2024; 2025–2026	696	91	126	217	374	85	9	11	20	32	
Kelly Fairchild	United States	C	1998–1999	1	0	0	0	0	–	–	–	–	–	
Todd Fedoruk	Canada	LW	2007–2008	11	0	2	2	33	–	–	–	–	–	
Taylor Fedun	Canada	D	2018–2020	81	6	14	20	22	18	0	0	0	6	
Brent Fedyk	Canada	LW	1995–1996	41	10	9	19	30	–	–	–	–	–	
Vernon Fiddler	Canada	C	2011–2016	366	43	69	112	210	19	2	4	6	32	
Mark Fistric	Canada	D	2007–2012	257	3	20	23	220	9	0	0	0	6	
Maxime Fortunus	Canada	D	2009–2014	9	0	1	1	4	–	–	–	–	–	
Iain Fraser	Canada	C	1994–1995	4	0	0	0	0	–	–	–	–	–	
Matt Fraser	Canada	LW	2011–2013	13	1	2	3	0	–	–	–	–	–	
Dave Gagner	Canada	C	1993–1996	169	60	69	129	169	14	6	2	8	6	
Aaron Gagnon	Canada	C	2009–2011	21	0	2	2	0	–	–	–	–	–	
Steve Gainey	Canada	LW	2000–2002	13	0	1	1	14	–	–	–	–	–	
Ryan Garbutt	Canada	C	2011–2015	198	30	40	70	215	6	3	0	3	25	
Rhett Gardner	Canada	C/LW	2019–2022	40	1	1	2	10	–	–	–	–	–	
Cameron Gaunce	Canada	D	2013–2015	9	0	0	0	7	–	–	–	–	–	
Aaron Gavey	Canada	C	1998–2000	48	7	6	13	54	13	1	2	3	10	
Brent Gilchrist	Canada	LW	1993–1997; 2001–2002	278	58	65	123	113	20	5	4	9	6	
Ben Gleason	United States	D	2018–2019	4	0	1	1	0	–	–	–	–	–	
Luke Glendening	United States	C	2021–2023	152	12	10	22	65	23	2	1	3	4	
Scott Glennie	Canada	RW	2011–2015	1	0	0	0	2	–	–	–	–	–	
Alex Goligoski	United States	D	2010–2016	385	32	155	187	132	19	5	6	11	14	
Sergei Gonchar	Russia	D	2013–2015	79	2	21	23	22	6	0	0	0	4	
Mikael Granlund	Finland	C	2024–2025	31	7	14	21	8	18	5	5	10	8	
Nicklas Grossmann	Sweden	D	2006–2012	333	3	38	41	170	18	1	1	2	6	
Bill Guerin	United States	RW	2002–2006	216	72	87	159	337	11	3	2	5	8	
Denis Gurianov	Russia	RW	2016–2017; 2018–2023	257	46	57	103	54	32	9	8	17	2	
Sergei Gusev	Russia	D	1997–1999	31	1	4	5	8	–	–	–	–	–	
Niklas Hagman	Finland	LW	2005–2008	218	50	35	85	101	30	4	3	7	28	
Jani Hakanpaa	Finland	D	2021–2024	226	12	28	40	136	22	1	3	4	20	
Jeff Halpern	United States	C	2006–2008	140	18	31	49	118	7	2	1	3	4	
Dan Hamhuis	Canada	D	2016–2018	159	4	36	40	56	–	–	–	–	–	
Joel Hanley	Canada	D	2018–2024	161	2	19	21	52	33	1	2	3	8	
Martin Hanzal	Czech Republic	C	2017–2019	45	6	6	12	27	–	–	–	–	–	
Thomas Harley*	Canada	D	2019–2026	267	38	101	139	68	63	5	22	27	26	
Todd Harvey	Canada	RW/C	1994–1998	239	38	61	99	449	12	0	1	1	18	
Derian Hatcher†	United States	D	1993–2003	717	59	204	263	1,144	95	6	25	31	175	SC 1999; Captain 1995–2003
Kevin Hatcher	United States	D	1994–1996	121	25	45	70	124	5	2	1	3	2	
Greg Hawgood	Canada	D	2001–2002	2	0	0	0	2	–	–	–	–	–	
Dillon Heatherington	Canada	D	2017–2019	11	0	2	2	26	1	0	0	0	0	
Miro Heiskanen*	Finland	D	2018–2026	552	67	279	346	172	99	19	52	71	26	
Sami Helenius	Finland	D	2000–2003	101	1	2	3	163	1	0	0	0	0	
Ales Hemsky	Czech Republic	RW	2014–2017	166	28	50	78	36	13	1	3	4	2	
Roope Hintz*	Finland	LW	2018–2026	521	190	231	421	172	95	27	42	69	38	
Benoit Hogue†	Canada	C	1995–1999; 2000–2002	238	39	73	112	179	45	7	6	13	44	SC 1999
Shawn Horcoff	Canada	C	2013–2015	153	18	31	49	79	6	1	5	6	5	
Julius Honka	Finland	D	2016–2019	87	2	11	13	28	–	–	–	–	–	
Tony Hrkac†	Canada	C	1997–1999	82	18	17	35	26	5	0	2	2	4	SC 1999
Justin Hryckowian*	Canada	F	2024–2026	86	14	17	31	43	6	0	1	1	0	
Bill Huard	Canada	LW	1995–1997	91	11	12	23	281	–	–	–	–	–	
Jiri Hudler	Czech Republic	C	2016–2017	32	3	8	11	4	–	–	–	–	–	
Cameron Hughes*	Canada	C	2025–2026	3	1	0	1	0	–	–	–	–	–	
Brett Hull†	United States	RW	1998–2001	218	95	101	196	91	55	21	25	46	14	SC 1999; HHOF 2009
Andrew Hutchinson	United States	D	2008–2009	38	2	3	5	12	–	–	–	–	–	
Arttu Hyry*	Finland	F	2024–2026	25	3	3	6	2	4	0	0	0	0	
Ric Jackman	Canada	D	1999–2001	38	1	2	3	24	–	–	–	–	–	
Jaromir Jagr	Czech Republic	RW	2012–2013	34	14	12	26	20	–	–	–	–	–	
Dan Jancevski	Canada	D	2005–2009	7	0	0	0	0	–	–	–	–	–	
Doug Janik	United States	D	2008–2009	13	0	1	1	2	–	–	–	–	–	
Mattias Janmark	Sweden	C	2015–2020	297	46	63	109	76	45	4	12	16	48	
Dustin Jeffrey	Canada	D	2013–2014	24	2	1	3	0	–	–	–	–	–	
Jim Johnson	United States	D	1993–1994	53	0	7	7	51	–	–	–	–	–	
Stephen Johns	United States	D	2015–2020	167	15	18	33	93	17	0	0	0	6	
Wyatt Johnston*	Canada	C	2022–2026	328	134	129	263	104	62	22	16	38	14	
Jussi Jokinen	Finland	C	2005–2008	215	45	86	131	62	9	2	2	4	0	
Jyrki Jokipakka	Finland	D	2014–2015	51	0	10	10	8	–	–	–	–	–	
Duane Joyce	United States	D	1993–1994	3	0	0	0	0	–	–	–	–	–	
Valeri Kamensky	Russia	LW	2001–2002	24	3	6	9	2	–	–	–	–	–	
Niko Kapanen	Finland	C	2001–2006	239	20	56	76	98	18	5	4	9	22	
Fredrik Karlström	Sweden	C	2021–2023	8	0	1	1	0	–	–	–	–	–	
Mike Keane†	Canada	RW	1997–2001	242	31	61	92	143	73	14	12	26	24	SC 1999
Dan Keczmer	United States	D	1996–1998	30	1	3	4	32	2	0	0	0	2	
Mike Kennedy	Canada	C	1994–1998	131	16	35	51	96	5	0	0	0	9	
Tanner Kero	United States	RW	2020–2022	62	3	10	13	6	–	–	–	–	–	
Dan Kesa	Canada	RW	1995–1996	3	0	0	0	2	–	–	–	–	–	
Joel Kiviranta	Finland	F	2019–2023	163	16	12	28	60	36	6	6	12	10	
Trent Klatt	United States	RW	1993–1996	130	30	38	68	79	14	3	1	4	4	
Jon Klemm	Canada	D	2003–2007	172	7	13	20	108	6	1	0	1	2	
John Klingberg	Sweden	D	2014–2022	552	71	303	374	213	59	7	28	35	48	
Vladislav Kolyachonok*	Belarus	D	2025–2026	11	1	2	3	4	–	–	–	–	–	
Lauri Korpikoski	Finland	LW	2016–2017	60	8	12	20	10	–	–	–	–	–	
Marc Labelle	Canada	LW	1996–1997	9	0	0	0	46	–	–	–	–	–	
Mike Lalor	United States	D	1993–1997	142	2	4	6	88	8	0	0	0	8	
Jamie Langenbrunner†	United States	RW	1994–2001	471	95	158	253	390	69	15	21	36	70	SC 1999
Philip Larsen	Denmark	D	2009–2013	95	5	14	19	34	–	–	–	–	–	
Mark Lawrence	Canada	RW	1994–1996	15	0	1	1	17	–	–	–	–	–	
Grant Ledyard	Canada	D	1993–1997	270	20	85	105	147	28	1	5	6	12	
Greg Leeb	Canada	C	2000–2001	2	0	0	0	0	–	–	–	–	–	
Jere Lehtinen†	Finland	RW	1995–2010	875	243	271	514	210	108	27	22	49	12	SC 1999
Claude Lemieux	Canada	RW	2002–2003	32	2	4	6	14	7	0	1	1	10	
Joel L'Esperance	United States	RW	2018–2021	33	5	0	5	10	–	–	–	–	–	
Junior Lessard	Canada	RW/C	2005–2008	8	2	0	2	14	–	–	–	–	–	
Alan Letang	Canada	D	1999–2000	8	0	0	0	2	–	–	–	–	–	
Doug Lidster†	Canada	D	1998–1999	17	0	0	0	10	4	0	0	0	2	SC 1999
Juha Lind	Finland	C	1997–2000	73	5	7	12	12	15	2	2	4	8	
Esa Lindell*	Finland	D	2015–2026	766	60	189	249	178	109	6	19	25	28	
Perttu Lindgren	Finland	C	2009–2010	1	0	0	0	0	–	–	–	–	–	
Eric Lindros	Canada	C	2006–2007	49	5	21	26	70	3	0	0	0	4	
Ben Lovejoy	United States	D	2018–2019	20	0	2	2	4	13	0	1	1	0	
Craig Ludwig†	United States	D	1993–1999	433	8	46	54	465	60	1	11	12	70	SC 1999
Warren Luhning	Canada	RW	1999–2000	10	0	1	1	13	–	–	–	–	–	
Brad Lukowich†	Canada	D	1997–2002	229	9	20	29	187	18	1	1	2	8	SC 1999
Jyrki Lumme	Finland	D	2001–2002	15	0	1	1	4	–	–	–	–	–	
Nils Lundkvist*	Sweden	D	2022–2026	210	11	40	51	78	16	0	3	3	4	
Joel Lundqvist	Sweden	C	2006–2009	134	7	19	26	56	25	4	5	9	14	
Roman Lyashenko	Russia	C	1999–2002	122	12	9	21	55	16	2	1	3	0	
Ilya Lyubushkin*	Russia	D	2024–2026	133	2	21	23	72	16	0	4	4	4	
Lane MacDermid	United States	LW	2012–2014	12	2	2	4	14	–	–	–	–	–	
John MacLean	Canada	RW	2000–2002	48	7	5	12	34	10	2	1	3	6	
Pat MacLeod	Canada	D	1995–1996	2	0	0	0	0	–	–	–	–	–	
Jeff MacMillan	Canada	D	2003–2004	4	0	0	0	0	–	–	–	–	–	
Sergei Makarov	Russia	RW	1996–1997	4	0	0	0	0	–	–	–	–	–	
Manny Malhotra	Canada	C	2001–2004	84	4	7	13	51	5	1	0	1	0	
Dave Manson	Canada	D	1999–2000; 2001–2002	60	1	3	4	45	23	0	0	0	2	
Mason Marchment	Canada	C	2022–2025	211	56	75	131	187	49	8	8	16	46	
Daniel Marois	Canada	RW	1995–1996	3	0	0	0	2	–	–	–	–	–	
Grant Marshall†	Canada	RW	1994–2001	402	52	82	134	492	59	0	10	10	79	SC 1999
Richard Matvichuk†	Canada	D	1993–2004	680	36	126	162	558	107	5	19	24	114	SC 1999
Alan May	Canada	RW	1993–1995	35	2	1	3	124	1	0	0	0	0	
Randy McKay	Canada	RW	2001–2002	14	1	4	5	7	–	–	–	–	–	
Curtis McKenzie	Canada	LW	2014–2018	99	10	13	23	131	–	–	–	–	–	
Jim McKenzie	Canada	LW	1993–1994	34	2	3	5	63	–	–	–	–	–	
Mark McNeill	Canada	RW	2016–2017	1	0	0	0	0	–	–	–	–	–	
Mike McPhee	Canada	LW	1993–1994	79	20	15	35	36	9	2	1	3	2	
Marc Methot	Canada	D	2017–2019	45	1	2	3	37	–	–	–	–	–	
Antti Miettinen	Finland	RW	2003–2008	238	38	53	91	118	24	2	3	5	10	
Corey Millen	United States	C	1994–1996	41	6	19	25	36	5	1	0	1	2	
Colin Miller	Canada	D	2022–2023	79	6	15	21	37	10	0	1	1	4	
Jeff Mitchell	United States	C/RW	1997–1998	7	0	0	0	7	–	–	–	–	–	
Willie Mitchell	Canada	D	2005–2006	16	0	2	2	26	5	0	0	0	2	
Mike Modano†	United States	C	1993–2010	1,142	434	616	1,050	665	135	46	72	118	96	SC 1999; HHOF 2014; Captain 2003–2006; Ret #9
Jaroslav Modry	Czech Republic	D	2006–2007	57	1	9	10	32	–	–	–	–	–	
Travis Moen	Canada	LW	2014–2016	57	3	8	11	35	–	–	–	–	–	
Jim Montgomery	Canada	C	2001–2003	9	0	2	2	0	–	–	–	–	–	
Gavin Morgan	Canada	C	2003–2004	6	0	0	0	21	–	–	–	–	–	
Travis Morin	United States	C	2011–2017	13	0	1	1	0	–	–	–	–	–	
Brendan Morrison	Canada	C	2008–2009	19	6	3	9	16	–	–	–	–	–	
Brenden Morrow	Canada	LW	1999–2013	835	243	285	528	1,203	78	17	25	42	100	Captain 2006–2013
Chris Mueller	United States	C	2013–2014	9	0	0	0	0	–	–	–	–	–	
Kirk Muller	Canada	LW	1999–2003	235	19	49	68	96	45	4	7	11	38	
Craig Muni	Canada	D	1997–1998	40	1	1	2	25	5	0	0	0	4	
Chris Murray	Canada	RW	1999–2000	32	2	1	3	62	–	–	–	–	–	
Tyler Myers*	Canada	D	2025–2026	16	0	3	3	12	5	0	0	0	4	
Ladislav Nagy	Slovakia	LW	2006–2007	25	4	10	14	6	7	1	1	2	2	
Vladislav Namestnikov	Russia	C	2021–2022	15	3	2	5	11	7	1	1	2	16	
James Neal	Canada	LW	2008–2011	214	72	59	131	175	–	–	–	–	–	
Mike Needham	Canada	RW	1993–1994	5	0	0	0	0	–	–	–	–	–	
Patrik Nemeth	Sweden	D	2013–2017	108	0	14	14	40	5	0	0	0	12	
Valeri Nichushkin	Russia	RW	2013–2016; 2018–2019	223	23	51	74	22	17	1	2	3	4	
Joe Nieuwendyk†	Canada	C	1995–2002	442	178	162	340	211	61	25	15	40	47	SC 1999; HHOF 2011
Janne Niinimaa	Finland	D	2005–2006	22	2	4	6	24	4	0	3	3	8	
Matt Niskanen	United States	D	2007–2011	277	16	66	82	136	16	0	3	3	10	
Mattias Norstrom	Sweden	D	2006–2008	80	2	13	15	48	25	2	3	5	24	
Teppo Numminen	Finland	D	2003–2004	62	3	14	17	18	4	0	1	1	0	
Eric Nystrom	United States	LW	2011–2013	122	23	9	32	85	–	–	–	–	–	
Lyle Odelein	Canada	D	2002–2003	3	0	0	0	6	–	–	–	–	–	
Johnny Oduya	Sweden	D	2015–2017	119	5	23	28	36	13	1	2	3	2	
Jamie Oleksiak	Canada	D	2012–2021	369	24	48	72	290	31	5	4	9	26	
David Oliver	Canada	RW	2002–2006	45	7	8	15	14	7	0	0	0	2	
Fredrik Olofsson	Sweden	LW	2022–2023	28	1	3	4	2	2	0	0	0	0	
Steve Ott	Canada	C	2002–2012	566	85	135	220	1,170	34	3	2	5	32	
Adam Pardy	Canada	D	2011–2012	36	0	3	3	16	–	–	–	–	–	
Mark Parrish	United States	RW	2008–2009	44	8	5	13	18	–	–	–	–	–	
Pavel Patera	Czech Republic	C	1999–2000	12	1	4	5	4	–	–	–	–	–	
Greg Pateryn	United States	D	2016–2018	85	1	15	16	56	–	–	–	–	–	
Joe Pavelski	United States	C	2019–2024	369	121	186	307	87	67	26	17	43	36	
Scott Pellerin	Canada	LW	2001–2003	53	4	8	12	23	–	–	–	–	–	
Nathan Perrott	Canada	RW	2005–2006	23	2	1	3	54	–	–	–	–	–	
Corey Perry	Canada	RW	2019–2020	57	5	16	21	70	27	5	4	9	27	
Warren Peters	Canada	C	2009–2010	11	1	0	1	2	–	–	–	–	–	
Toby Petersen	United States	C	2007–2013	243	17	23	40	38	16	0	0	0	2	
Jacob Peterson	Sweden	C	2021–2023	66	12	5	17	12	3	0	0	0	0	
Alex Petrovic*	Canada	D	2023–2026	60	2	8	10	51	25	1	1	2	6	
Robert Petrovicky	Slovakia	C	1995–1996	5	1	1	2	0	–	–	–	–	–	
Rich Peverley	Canada	C	2013–2014	62	7	23	30	15	–	–	–	–	–	
Tyler Pitlick	United States	C	2017–2019	127	22	17	39	40	6	0	0	0	2	
Derek Plante†	United States	C	1998–2000	26	3	4	7	6	6	1	0	1	4	SC 1999
Roman Polak	Czech Republic	D	2018–2020	118	1	12	13	93	13	0	1	1	10	
Vojtech Polak	Czech Republic	LW	2005–2007	5	0	0	0	0	–	–	–	–	–	
Jamie Pushor	Canada	D	1999–2000	62	0	8	8	53	5	0	0	0	5	
Derrick Pouliot	Canada	D	2023–2024	5	0	0	0	0	–	–	–	–	–	
Mark Pysyk	Canada	D	2020–2021	36	3	1	4	20	–	–	–	–	–	
Alexander Radulov	Russia	RW	2017–2022	294	79	133	212	208	43	13	15	28	32	
Michael Raffl	Austria	LW	2021–2022	76	7	9	16	16	7	2	1	3	19	
Brendan Ranford	Canada	LW	2014–2015	1	0	0	0	0	–	–	–	–	–	
Mikko Rantanen*	Finland	RW	2024–2026	84	27	68	95	115	24	10	19	29	22	
Dave Reid†	Canada	LW	1996–1999	220	31	43	74	40	35	3	11	14	20	SC 1999
Mike Ribeiro	Canada	C	2006–2012	461	123	284	407	252	25	3	17	20	20	
Brad Richards	Canada	C	2007–2011	220	70	157	227	44	18	3	12	15	8	
Travis Richards	United States	D	1994–1996	3	0	0	0	2	–	–	–	–	–	
Brett Ritchie	Canada	RW	2014–2019	241	33	21	54	156	3	0	0	0	2	
Jason Robertson*	United States	LW	2019–2026	456	213	277	490	130	62	23	29	52	6	
Stephane Robidas	Canada	D	2002–2014	704	46	165	211	610	42	3	12	15	38	
Aaron Rome	Canada	D	2012–2014	52	0	6	6	29	1	0	0	0	0	
Antoine Roussel	France	LW	2012–2018	413	64	77	141	806	19	2	3	5	43	
Derek Roy	Canada	C	2012–2013	30	4	18	22	4	–	–	–	–	–	
Martin Rucinsky	Czech Republic	LW	2001–2002	42	6	11	17	24	–	–	–	–	–	
Kris Russell	Canada	D	2015–2016	11	0	4	4	2	–	–	–	–	–	
Michael Ryder	Canada	RW	2011–2013	101	41	35	76	54	–	–	–	–	–	
Raymond Sawada	Canada	RW	2008–2011	11	1	0	1	0	–	–	–	–	–	
Colton Sceviour	Canada	C	2010–2016	170	28	34	62	38	17	3	5	8	0	
David Schlemko	Canada	D	2014–2015	5	0	0	0	2	–	–	–	–	–	
Brandon Segal	Canada	RW	2009–2011	65	10	10	20	59	–	–	–	–	–	
Tyler Seguin*	Canada	C	2013–2026	813	311	394	705	245	109	23	38	61	34	
Andrej Sekera	Slovakia	D	2019–2022	135	6	11	17	34	27	0	1	1	0	
Lubomir Sekeras	Slovakia	D	2003–2004	4	1	1	2	2	–	–	–	–	–	
Brent Severyn	Canada	LW	1998–1999	30	1	2	3	50	–	–	–	–	–	
Patrick Sharp	Canada	LW	2015–2017	124	28	45	73	58	13	4	2	6	0	
Devin Shore	Canada	C	2015–2019	209	29	53	82	35	–	–	–	–	–	
Jon Sim†	Canada	LW	1998–2003	77	9	6	15	38	11	1	0	1	6	SC 1999
Tommy Sjodin	Sweden	D	1993–1994	7	0	2	2	4	–	–	–	–	–	
Jarrod Skalde	Canada	C	1997–1998	1	0	0	0	0	–	–	–	–	–	
Martin Skoula	Czech Republic	D	2005–2006	61	4	11	15	36	–	–	–	–	–	
Karlis Skrastins	Latvia	D	2009–2011	153	5	16	21	62	–	–	–	–	–	
Brian Skrudland†	Canada	C	1997–2000	75	7	3	10	65	36	0	3	3	32	SC 1999
Blake Sloan†	United States	RW	1998–2001; 2003–2004	142	6	15	21	71	35	0	2	2	20	SC 1999
Brendan Smith	Canada	D	2024–2025	32	1	5	6	33	–	–	–	–	–	
Craig Smith	United States	C	2023–2024	75	11	9	20	33	14	0	2	2	2	
Derrick Smith	Canada	LW	1993–1994	1	0	0	0	0	–	–	–	–	–	
Gemel Smith	Canada	C	2016–2019	77	11	9	20	38	–	–	–	–	–	
Reilly Smith	Canada	RW	2011–2013	40	3	6	9	10	–	–	–	–	–	
Sheldon Souray	Canada	D	2011–2012	64	6	15	21	73	–	–	–	–	–	
Jason Spezza	Canada	C	2014–2019	379	81	147	228	120	24	8	10	18	2	
Garrett Stafford	United States	D	2008–2009	3	0	2	2	0	–	–	–	–	–	
Logan Stankoven	Canada	C	2023–2025	83	15	28	43	10	19	3	5	8	2	
Sam Steel*	Canada	C	2023–2026	229	27	55	82	84	43	2	10	12	22	
Patrik Stefan	Czech Republic	C	2006–2007	41	5	6	11	10	–	–	–	–	–	
Jeremy Stevenson	United States	LW	2006–2007	16	1	0	1	21	1	0	0	0	0	
Jim Storm	United States	LW	1995–1996	10	1	2	3	17	–	–	–	–	–	
Marian Studenic	Slovakia	RW	2021–2023	19	1	2	3	6	4	0	0	0	2	
Ryan Suter	United States	D	2021–2024	246	12	62	74	94	45	1	12	13	36	
Brian Sutherby	Canada	C	2008–2011	139	12	10	22	176	–	–	–	–	–	
Jaroslav Svoboda	Czech Republic	LW	2005–2006	43	4	3	7	22	2	0	0	0	2	
Don Sweeney	Canada	D	2003–2004	63	0	11	11	18	5	0	0	0	2	
Darryl Sydor†	Canada	D	1995–2003; 2006–2007; 2008–2009	714	69	265	334	401	99	6	32	38	46	SC 1999
Chris Tancill	United States	C	1993–1994; 1997–1998	14	1	4	5	8	–	–	–	–	–	
Chris Tanev	Canada	D	2023–2024	19	1	4	5	10	19	0	2	2	6	
Chris Therien	Canada	D	2003–2004	11	0	0	0	2	5	2	0	2	0	
Scott Thornton	Canada	LW	1999–2000	30	6	3	9	38	23	2	7	9	28	
Mark Tinordi	Canada	D	1993–1994	61	6	18	24	143	–	–	–	–	–	Captain 1993–1995
Mathias Tjarnqvist	Sweden	RW	2003–2007	69	4	8	12	24	–	–	–	–	–	
Patrick Traverse	Canada	D	2005–2006	1	0	0	0	0	–	–	–	–	–	
Riley Tufte	United States	LW	2021–2023	13	1	0	1	4	–	–	–	–	–	
Pierre Turgeon	Canada	C	2001–2007	207	42	87	129	54	10	1	4	5	2	
Rob Valicevic	United States	RW	2003–2004	7	0	0	0	2	–	–	–	–	–	
Shaun Van Allen	Canada	C	2000–2002	78	9	20	29	22	8	0	2	2	12	
Jarkko Varvio	Finland	RW	1993–1995	13	3	4	7	4	–	–	–	–	–	
Sami Vatanen	Finland	D	2020–2021	9	0	0	0	2	–	–	–	–	–	
Pat Verbeek†	Canada	RW	1996–1999; 2001–2002	305	72	92	164	503	42	7	9	16	56	SC 1999
Tomas Vincour	Czech Republic	C	2010–2013	86	7	8	15	8	–	–	–	–	–	
Ivan Vishnevskiy	Russia	D	2008–2010	5	0	2	2	2	–	–	–	–	–	
Tom Wandell	Sweden	C	2008–2013	229	20	23	43	52	–	–	–	–	–	
Francis Wathier	Canada	LW	2009–2013	10	0	0	0	5	–	–	–	–	–	
Ray Whitney	Canada	LW	2012–2014	101	20	41	61	18	5	0	0	0	0	
Jason Williams	Canada	C	2010–2011	27	2	3	5	6	–	–	–	–	–	
Landon Wilson	United States	RW	2008–2009	27	2	6	8	21	–	–	–	–	–	
Brad Winchester	United States	LW	2007–2008	41	1	2	3	46	6	0	0	0	8	
Randy Wood	United States	LW/C	1995–1996	30	1	4	5	26	–	–	–	–	–	
Mark Wotton	Canada	D	2000–2001	1	0	0	0	0	–	–	–	–	–	
Jeff Woywitka	Canada	D	2009–2011	99	2	12	14	35	–	–	–	–	–	
Jamie Wright	Canada	LW	1997–2001	57	6	6	12	18	5	0	0	0	0	
Scott Young	United States	RW	2002–2004	132	31	27	58	44	14	5	3	8	8	
Peter Zezel	Canada	C	1994–1995	30	6	5	11	19	3	1	0	1	0	
Doug Zmolek	United States	D	1993–1996	91	2	10	12	143	12	0	1	1	14	
Sergei Zubov†	Russia	D	1996–2009	839	111	438	549	254	132	16	71	87	60	SC 1999; HHOF 2019
Mats Zuccarello	Norway	LW	2018–2019	2	1	2	3	0	13	4	7	11	6	
