= Duane Joyce =

American ice hockey player

- Born: May 5, 1965 (age 59); Pembroke, Massachusetts, U.S.
- Height: 6 ft 2 in (188 cm)
- Weight: 205 lb (93 kg; 14 st 9 lb)
- Position: Defense
- Shot: Right
- Played for: Dallas Stars
- NHL draft: Undrafted
- Playing career: 1987–1998

Duane Adam Joyce (born May 5, 1965) is an American former professional ice hockey defenseman. He played three games in the National Hockey League with the Dallas Stars in the 1993–94 season. The rest of his career, which lasted from 1987 to 1998, was spent in the minor leagues. He was born in Pembroke, Massachusetts. As a youth, he played in the 1978 Quebec International Pee-Wee Hockey Tournament with the Hobomock minor ice hockey team from Pembroke.

== Career statistics ==
=== Regular season and playoffs ===
			Regular season					Playoffs
Season	Team	League	GP	G	A	Pts	PIM	GP	G	A	Pts	PIM
1981–82	Tabor Academy	HS-MA	—	—	—	—	—	—	—	—	—	—
1982–83	Tabor Academy	HS-MA	—	—	—	—	—	—	—	—	—	—
1983–84	Union College	ECAC 2	—	—	—	—	—	—	—	—	—	—
1984–85	Union College	ECAC 2	—	—	—	—	—	—	—	—	—	—
1985–86	Union College	ECAC 2	25	7	12	19	—	—	—	—	—	—
1986–87	Union College	ECAC 2	25	8	11	19	—	—	—	—	—	—
1987–88	Virginia Lancers	AAHL	42	22	45	67	73	8	3	5	8	6
1987–88	Springfield Indians	AHL	1	1	1	2	0	—	—	—	—	—
1988–89	Springfield Indians	AHL	3	0	0	0	0	—	—	—	—	—
1988–89	Port aux Basques Mariners	NFSHL	15	4	14	18	21	—	4	10	14	—
1989–90	Kalamazoo Wings	IHL	2	0	0	0	2	—	—	—	—	—
1989–90	Fort Wayne Komets	IHL	66	10	26	36	53	—	—	—	—	—
1989–90	Muskegon Lumberjacks	IHL	13	3	10	13	8	12	3	7	10	13
1990–91	Kalamazoo Wings	IHL	80	12	32	44	53	11	0	3	3	6
1991–92	Kansas City Blades	IHL	80	12	32	44	62	15	6	11	17	8
1992–93	Kansas City Blades	IHL	75	15	25	40	30	12	1	2	3	6
1993–94	Dallas Stars	NHL	3	0	0	0	0	—	—	—	—	—
1993–94	Kansas City Blades	IHL	43	9	23	32	40	—	—	—	—	—
1994–95	Kansas City Blades	IHL	71	9	21	30	31	21	2	5	7	4
1995–96	Cincinnati Cyclones	IHL	49	11	25	36	36	—	—	—	—	—
1995–96	Orlando Solar Bears	IHL	34	3	17	20	18	21	4	6	10	2
1996–97	Carolina Monarchs	AHL	34	6	18	24	27	—	—	—	—	—
1996–97	Cincinnati Cyclones	IHL	38	3	16	19	12	3	1	2	3	0
1997–98	Adirondack Red Wings	AHL	66	7	21	28	30	—	—	—	—	—
1997–98	Detroit Vipers	IHL	7	0	2	2	4	15	5	4	9	4
IHL totals			558	87	229	316	349	110	22	40	62	43
NHL totals			3	0	0	0	0	—	—	—	—	—
