= 1986–87 NCAA Division II men's ice hockey season =

Alabama-Huntsville was the only school to field a team during the 1986–87 NCAA Division II men's ice hockey season. They played an independent schedule, and moved up to Division I for 1987–88.

== Regular season ==
Standings

1986–87 NCAA Division II Independent ice hockey standings
	Overall record					
	GP	W	L	T	GF	GA
Alabama–Huntsville	30	20	10	0		

=== Results ===
- 10/31: Alabama-Huntsville - Iowa State (6:3)
- 11/1: Alabama-Huntsville - Iowa State (10:6)
- 11/7: Alabama-Huntsville - St. Michael's (6:4)
- 11/8: Geneseo State - Alabama-Huntsville (6:3)
- 11/21: Alabama-Huntsville - Villanova (13:2)
- 11/22: Alabama-Huntsville - Villanova (15:1)
- 11/29: Colgate - Alabama-Huntsville (3:2)
- 11/30: Colgate - Alabama-Huntsville (12:2)
- 12/5: North Dakota State - Alabama-Huntsville (4:2)
- 12/6: Alabama-Huntsville - North Dakota State (4:2)
- 12/12: Alabama-Huntsville - Notre Dame (4:0)
- 12/13: Alabama-Huntsville - Notre Dame (6:3)
- 1/2: Merrimack - Alabama-Huntsville (6:1)
- 1/3: Alabama-Huntsville - Merrimack (6:4)
- 1/9: Alabama-Huntsville - Michigan-Dearborn (6:4)
- 1/10: Michigan-Dearborn - Alabama-Huntsville (9:8)
- 1/16: Alabama-Huntsville - Fairfield (9:1)
- 1/17: Alabama-Huntsville - Wesleyan (5:1)
- 1/23: Alabama-Huntsville - Iowa State (3:1)
- 1/24: Alabama-Huntsville - Iowa State (9:4)
- 1/30: Michigan-Dearborn - Alabama-Huntsville (6:3)
- 1/31: Alabama-Huntsville - Michigan-Dearborn (4:2)
- 2/5: Quebec Trois-Rivieres - Alabama-Huntsville (8:5)
- 2/6: Quebec Trois-Rivieres - Alabama-Huntsville (6:4)
- 2/13: Alabama-Huntsville - Air Force (5:2)
- 2/14: Air Force - Alabama-Huntsville (4:1)
- 2/20: Alabama-Huntsville - Ohio University (9:2)
- 2/21: Alabama-Huntsville - Ohio University (6:3)
- 2/27: Alabama-Huntsville - Upsala (11:6)
- 2/28: Alabama-Huntsville - Notre Dame (3:2 OT)
